= Attack of 7 August 1932 in Rennes =

Bombing of a sculpture in Brittany, France

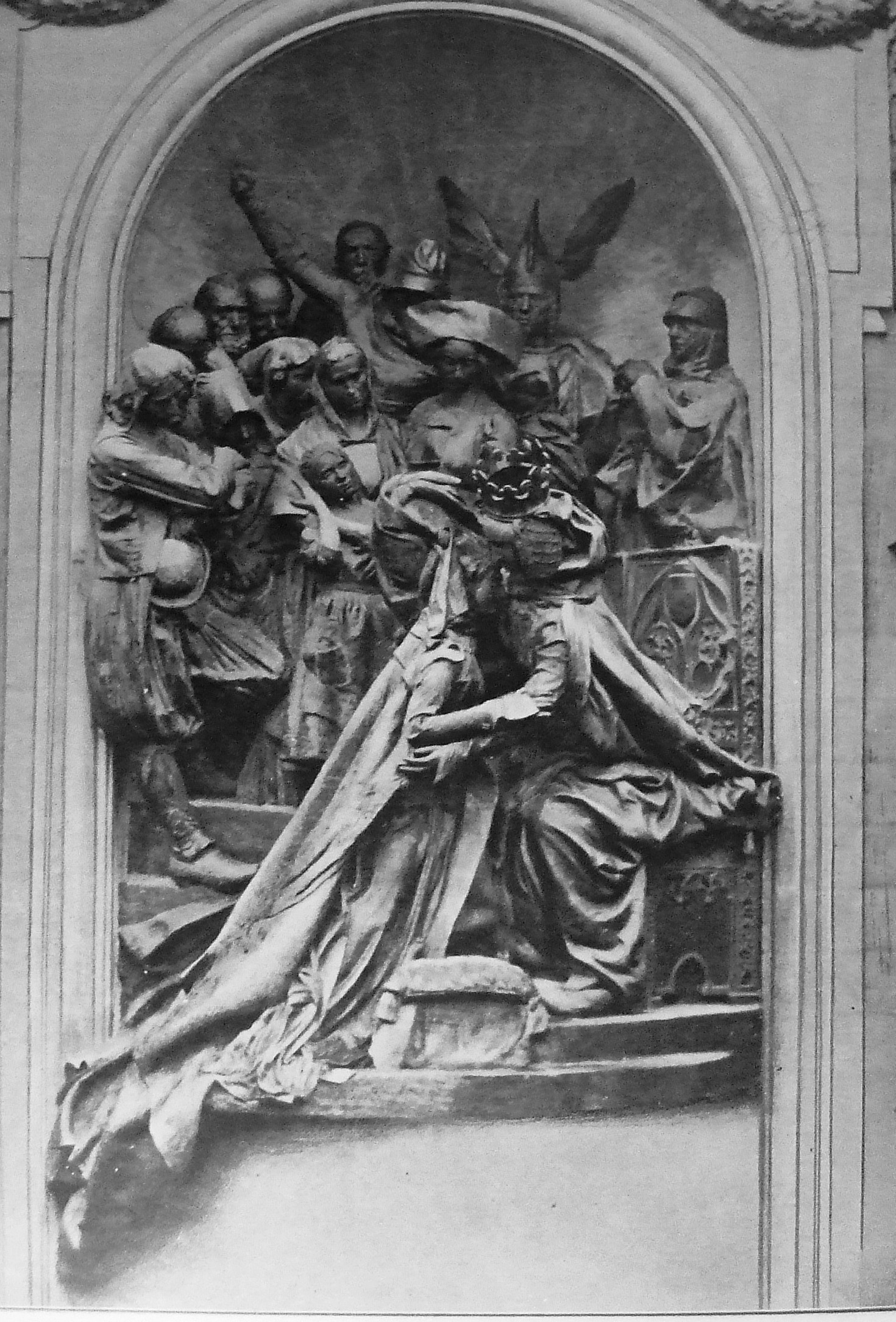
- Monument targeted and destroyed by bomb. Photo taken in 1911.

- Attack of 7 August 1932 in Rennes (Rennes) Location in Rennes
- Location: 48°06′41″N 01°40′48″W; Rennes
- Date: 7 August 1932; 4:40
- Target: Monument symbolizing the union of Brittany with France
- Attack type: Bombing
- Weapon: Bomb
- Perpetrator: Gwenn ha Du
- Assailants: Célestin Lainé and André Geffroy

The bomb attack of 7 August 1932 in Rennes was aimed at a work by the sculptor Jean Boucher, symbolizing the union of Brittany and France, and placed in a niche in Rennes City Hall. Since its inauguration in 1911, the statue, representing Anne of Brittany, had been considered degrading by the Breton movement, due to its kneeling position before the King of France.

Its symbolic setting was the festivities marking the 400th anniversary of Brittany's union with France, which took place in Vannes on the same day. The first attack committed by the Breton movement, it was also the first action of the armed group Gwenn ha Du. It was carried out by Célestin Lainé, who supplied the bomb, and André Geffroy, who planted it.

Although the event had few concrete political consequences and did not represent a key date in the history of the Breton movement, it immediately acquired a strong symbolic charge among its militants.

== Context ==
=== Creation of the statue ===
The statue is a work by Jean Boucher representing the Duchess Anne of Brittany kneeling before the French King Charles VIII, symbolizing the union of Brittany and France. It was unveiled with great fanfare on 29 October 1911 in Rennes to mark the 420th anniversary of the marriage of the two sovereigns, and by decision of the city council it occupied a niche in the Rennes City Hall where, until the French Revolution, another statue featuring Louis XV had stood, already embodying the theme of the union of Brittany and France.

Its creation was part of a process of statuomanie aimed at integrating provincial memories into that of the Republic, put in place by the Third Republic, and peaking in activity between 1871 and 1914. This was accompanied by major ceremonies and the presence of members of the government. The Rennes inauguration in 1911 was accompanied by night parties in the Parc du Thabor and a procession evoking the marriage of Anne of Brittany and Charles VIII at the Château de Langeais. The ceremonies were attended by ministers Théodore Steeg and Charles Chaumet.

=== Local reception of the work ===
At the time, Brittany was experiencing the development of a regionalist movement, marked by the creation of the Breton Regionalist Union (URB) in 1898 and the Gorsedd of Brittany in 1900. Both movements had reservations about Duchess Anne's kneeling position, which was at odds with the image she enjoyed in Brittany's history. They were therefore torn between what they interpreted as a possible misappropriation of their heritage, and the possibility of asserting themselves on the occasion of this ceremony. Neither of them took part in the festivities, with only Anatole Le Braz, former president of the URB, attending as an individual. The inauguration was disrupted by Camille Le Mercier d'Erm and his Breton Nationalist Party, who called it a "monument of shame". Public opinion at the time, while not following the party's line, considered the monument humiliating.

The academic nature of Jean Boucher's work was also a source of criticism in the region. A number of local artistic movements, including the later Seiz Breur, sought to move away from folkloristic botrelleries, and Boucher's style came in for criticism.

=== Growing tensions before the attack ===
The Breton movement underwent a process of radicalization from the 1920s onwards, with the creation of two political parties in 1927: the Breton Federalist League and the Breton National Party. The announcement in 1932 of celebrations to mark the 400th anniversary of Brittany's union with France aroused strong feelings among them, which crystallized around Boucher's sculpture. The PNB newspaper Breiz Atao ran a press campaign against the sculpture in every issue from January 1932 onwards.

In addition, the Irish example, in particular the actions of the IRA, inspired part of the Breton movement at the time. One of the PNB's activists, Fant Rozec, had visited Ireland the previous year to study the Irish republican movement; she met Frank Ryan, former head of the IRA's Dublin brigade, and wrote several articles in Breiz Atao during her year in Ireland, reporting on the situation of the republicans there.

== The attack ==
=== Course of events and investigation ===
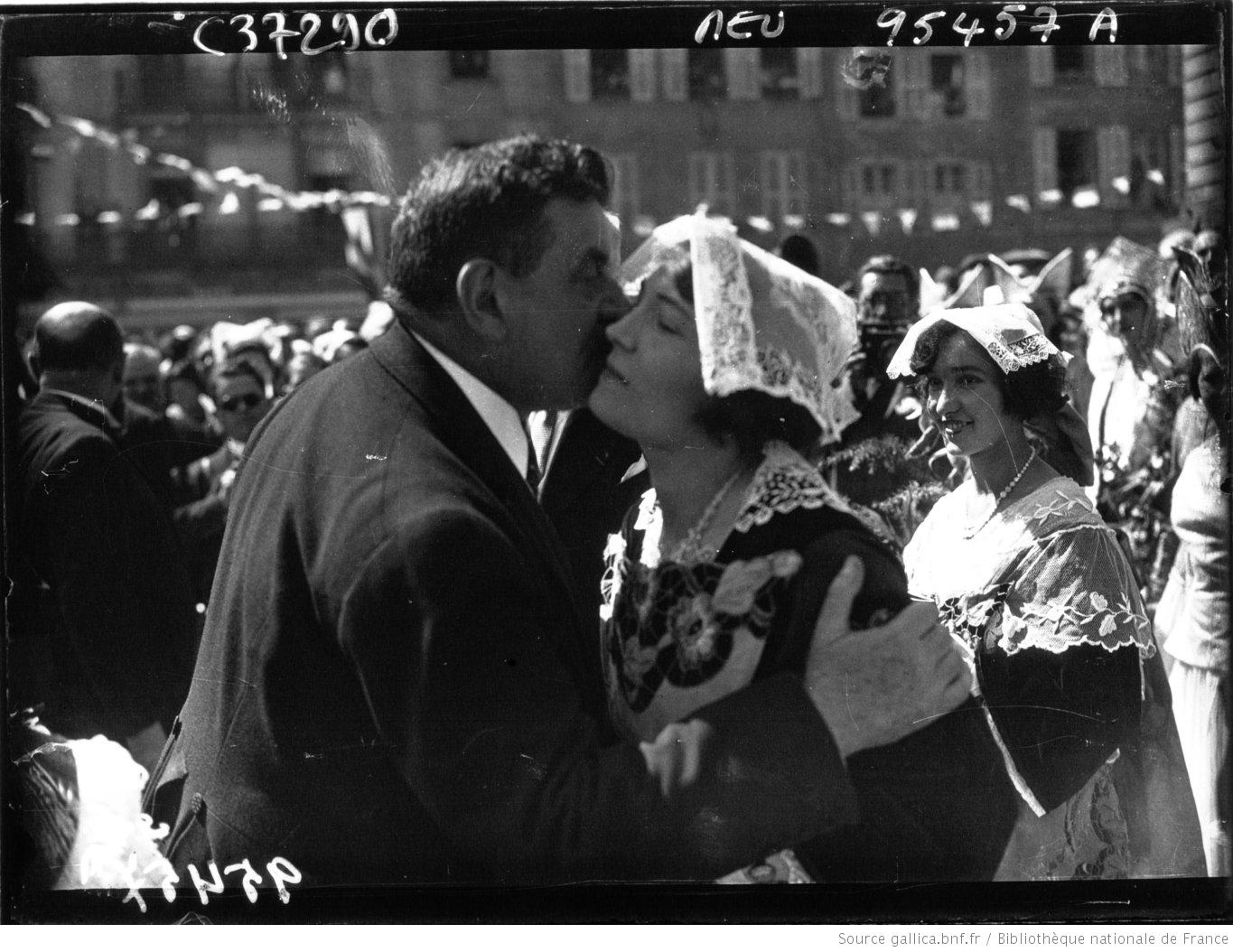
French Prime Minister Édouard Herriot in Vannes on the 400th anniversary of the Union of Brittany and France

On 7 August, celebrations to mark the 400th anniversary of Brittany's union with France were scheduled in Vannes, to be attended by French Prime Minister Édouard Herriot. Since the evening of the previous day, Breton activists from various parties who had travelled to disrupt the celebrations – including PNB president François Debeauvais – had been held in police custody as a precautionary measure, and were not released until the morning of the 7th.

The bomb used was prepared by Célestin Lainé, a chemical engineer by training, and it was another militant, André Geffroy, who placed the mechanism in the monument, at crown level. Lainé had tested a first device on the moor at Saint-Aubin-du-Cormier (Note: The Battle of Saint-Aubin-du-Cormier is an important lieu de mémoire to the Breton movement, which in 1488 saw the defeat of the troops of the duchy of Brittany by the kingdom of France, resulting in the loss of its independence.) a short time earlier, burning his jacket in the process, due to his lack of experience with explosives. (Note: François Debeauvais, who runs the PNB, is said to have provided financial assistance to Lainé so that he could buy another one.) The bomb he supplied to Geffroy consisted of a "Gloria" milk can filled with nitroglycerine. The detonator was supplied by Jeanne Coroller. The explosion sounded at 4.40 am, knocking the statue to the ground and shattering it into several pieces, pulverizing windows within a 100-meter radius. Neither of the two people inside the city hall was injured. In a letter sent to the press claiming responsibility for the action, the signatory Gwenn ha Du, an organization no one had ever heard of, stated: "We open the struggle for the independence of our country on this anniversary of our annexation by destroying the symbol of our subjugation that sits enthroned in the center of our capital". In addition to Lainé, other activists in the group at the time included Le Helloco and Fant Rozec.

In the first few days, the investigation focused on the management of the Breiz Atao newspaper, whose head office in rue Edith Cavel was just a hundred meters from the site of the event, and where searches were carried out on 9 August. On 11 August, the newspaper L'Ouest-Éclair announced the arrest of 6 suspects, including Théophile Jeusset, editor of the newspaper Breiz da zont. After confessing to the attack, four of them recanted on 12 August. In the following days, investigators questioned people linked to the newspaper War Zao in Guingamp on 17 August, then on 19 August visited Olier Mordrel in Quimper, and René-Yves Creston in Le Croisic. In the end, the affair led to the detention of several activists in the movement for around fifty days, but without any legal consequences.

=== Reactions ===
The attack was condemned by most politicians of the day, from the mayor of Rennes, Jean Lemaistre, who spoke of "an abominable attack", to the President of the Council, Édouard Herriot, who saw in it the hand of Germany. Most of the press, both national and regional, condemned the act. Le Matin wrote that "passers-by (...) contemplated, appalled, the work of vandalism whose perpetrators they condemned", and L'Ouest-Éclair reported that "the people of Rennes, rightly proud of all the monuments that embellish their great city, were deeply moved".

The attack received rare support. The newspaper L'Humanité, in the name of the right of peoples to self-determination, wrote: "Reservoir of men, slaughterhouse of war, that's all Herriot sees in Brittany". The Irish republican newspaper An Phoblacht wrote: "the Bretons and all friends of liberty welcome a gesture which proclaims that one more small nation has sworn to emancipation".

The destruction was welcomed by most of the Breton movement. Fant Rozec, posing for the press in front of the remains of the monument, earned the nickname of "red virgin", saying she regretted having had nothing to do with it. Vefa de Saint-Pierre also publicly rejoiced in the act, and Yann Sohier spoke of "an explosion of joy". René-Yves Creston took the opportunity to publish a special issue of his magazine Keltia, entitled "Art, dynamite, police et Bretagne en 1932", in which most of the artists consulted approve of the attack from an artistic point of view. Following a search of the premises, documents leading to the publication of the next issue of Keltia were seized, bringing the magazine to an end.

Later in 1946 the Welsh nationalist Saunders Lewis (co-founder of Plaid Cymru) used the incident to compare the French and British legal systems, drawing a parallel between the attack in Rennes and one in which he participated, known as Tân yn Llŷn: (Note: On 8 September 1936, an RAF barracks in the village of Penrhos, on the Llŷn Peninsula, was set on fire by Welsh nationalists to mark the fourth centenary of the Act of Union of 1536, which saw the annexation of Wales by England. The Welsh nationalists took themselves prisoner and used the trial as a platform for their ideas.) "British justice judges only facts and consequences. It does not judge the political motivations of the accused. French justice has no such scruples. The Welsh could only be convicted of arson; the Bretons would have been charged with "attempting to undermine the integrity of national territory", which carries much heavier penalties. And yet it is only through widely publicized trials that these actions can have the wide publicity repercussions we expect from them".

== After the event ==
=== Non-replacement of the work ===
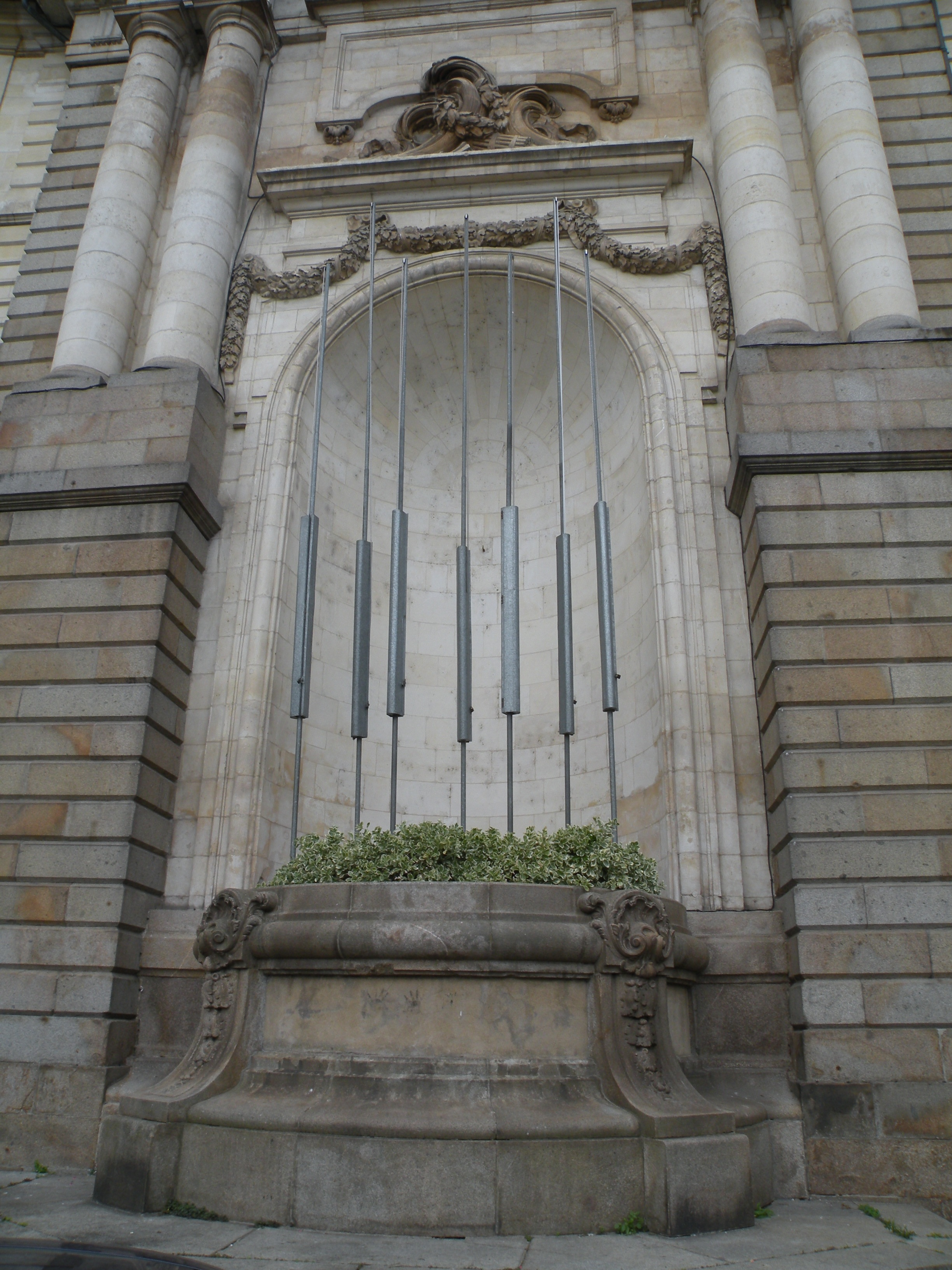
The niche in Rennes city hall, which has remained empty since Boucher's work was destroyed.

The municipality of Rennes soon began to work on replacing the work, and Jean Lemaistre considered launching a fund-raising campaign. In 1937, his successor François Château obtained a budget of 400,000 francs from the city council, and the State pledged the same sum to replace the sculpture. Despite warnings from nationalists, he wished to retain elements of the first work, namely a production by Jean Boucher and official ceremonies.

Boucher set to work and presented a new design, which he said was "in line with historical truth". It featured two women, one representing France, the other Brittany, the former holding out her hand to the latter, and the latter presenting her with two other figures: a sailor and a peasant. The project was contested by nationalist François Jaffrennou, who spoke of a "delivery of human flesh". (Note: After the First World War, the figure of 240,000 deaths was put forward for Brittany (well above the French average), and was taken up as a symbol by the Breton movement.) Due to doubts about the contours of the "historical truth" Boucher was talking about, and threats from nationalists, the project never materialized, and the niche has remained empty ever since.

=== Implications for the Breton movement ===
The Gwenn ha Du group went on to carry out other bomb attacks targeting symbols. That same year, on the night of 19–20 November, as the presidential train was due to travel to Nantes to mark the 400th anniversary of Brittany's union with France, a bomb blew up the rails at the Breton "border" at Ingrandes, and was again claimed by the group. Célestin Lainé later moved to northern France for professional reasons, which suspended the group's actions for a few years. In spring 1936, to celebrate the anniversary of the 1916 Easter Rising, Gwenn ha Du set off bombs in five Breton prefectures. In 1938, it attacked the monument to the Breton-Angel federation in Pontivy to protest against the decree-law of 25 May 1938, which made it an offence to attempt to undermine territorial integrity.

The attack also provided publicity and a degree of credibility for a movement that was moribund at the time, due to its recent divisions. Although it didn't revive the movement, and 1933 was to be the most financially complicated year for the Breton National Party (PNB), it nevertheless brought a new wave of members to the party, (Note: Kristian Hamon distinguished two generations of militants in this party. The first, present from the early post-World War I years, and the second, present from the early 1930s, for whom the destruction of a statue symbolizing the union of Brittany and France in Rennes acted as a trigger.) and some of these new militants, such as Yann Goulet, would later play an important role in the group's history. However, these movements remained relatively cut off from the concerns of a population for which they held little interest. Even a future figure in the movement, Pierre-Jakez Hélias, then a student in Rennes, saw it only as "a symbolic attack, committed by a few enthusiasts, but with little connection to the situation (...) in Brittany".

One of the PNB's leaders, Olier Mordrel, also took the initiative of creating the underground group Kuzul Meur, of which he became secretary, with the stated aim of liaising between the various political groups that had emerged from Breton nationalism, but also to better control the Gwenn ha Du group and its leader Célestin Lainé.

=== Historiography ===
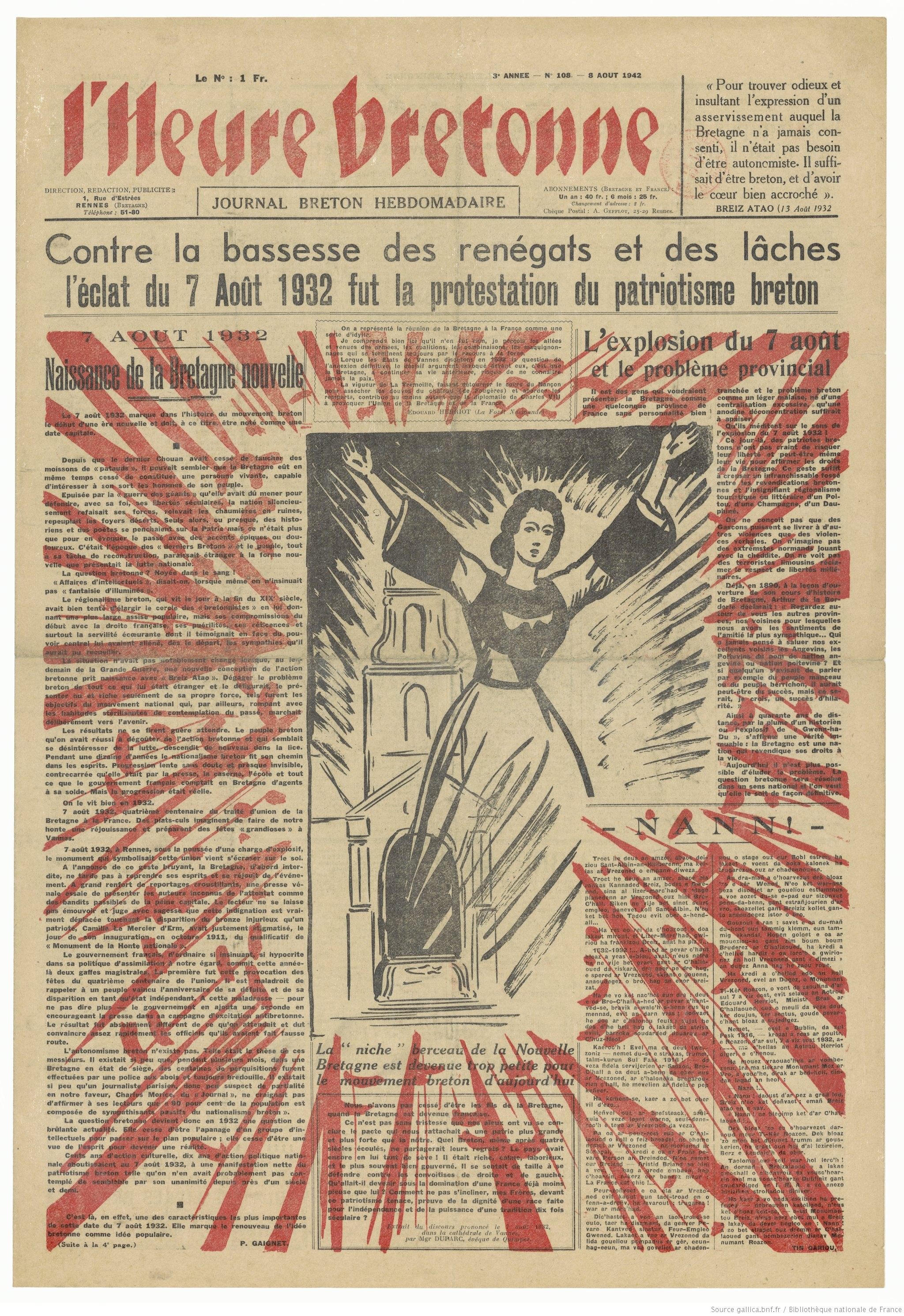
August 1942 issue of L'Heure bretonne "celebrating" the 1932 attack.

The attack quickly became part of the long-term "heritage" of Breton activists, but historians did not regard it as a key date in the movement's history, and it was only briefly mentioned in general works on the history of Brittany.

On the other hand, it plays an important role in books written by activists, who are more interested in bearing witness than in scientific work. In 1938, for example, Ronan Caouissin published the book Gwenn ha Du, la société secrète qui a juré de rendre à la Bretagne son indépendance (Gwenn ha Du, the secret society sworn to restore Brittany's independence, in english). In 1970, Morvan Lebesque's pamphlet Comment peut-on être breton (How can you be Breton?) symbolized both the Third Republic's view of Brittany as "a begging and serving province", and the plastic artists' quest for cultural and political recognition. In 1982, the magazine Dalc'homp Sonj took a similar approach.

== Bibliography ==
Documents used as a source for this article.

- General works on the history of Brittany:
  - Cornette, Joël (2008). Histoire de la Bretagne et des Bretons. Cornette T2 (in French). Vol. II. ISBN 978-2-7578-0996-9.
  - Denis, Michel; Monnier, Jean-Jacques; Le Coadic, Ronan; Gourlay, Patrick; Geslin, Claude (2010). Histoire d'un siècle, Bretagne 1901-2000: l'émancipation d'un monde. Histoire d'un siècle (in French). Morlaix. ISBN 978-2-915623-62-8.
- Publications focused on the Breton movement:
  - Cadiou, Georges (2013). Breizh, Coop (ed.). EMSAV: dictionnaire critique, historique et biographique: Le mouvement breton de A à Z du XXème siècle à nos jours. Cadiou 2013 (in French). Spézet. ISBN 978-2-84346-574-1.
  - Chartier, Erwan (2010). La construction de l'interceltisme en Bretagne, des origines à nos jours: mise en perspective historique et idéologique (PDF) (in French). Rennes.
  - Chartier, Erwan (2007). Morvan Lebesque : le masque et la plume d'un intellectuel en quête de Bretagne. Chartier 2007 (in French). Spézet. ISBN 978-2-84346-305-1.
  - Chartier, Erwan; Cabon, Alain (November 2006). Coop Breizh (ed.). Le dossier FLB: plongée chez les clandestins bretons. Chartier Cabon 2006 (in French). Spézet. ISBN 978-2-84346-296-2.
  - Hamon, Kristian (2001). An Here (ed.). Les Nationalistes bretons sous l'Occupation. Hamon 2001 (in French). Le Relecq-Kerhuon. ISBN 978-2-86843-224-7.
  - Hamon, Kristian (2004). Le Bezen Perrot 1944, des nationalistes bretons sous l'uniforme allemand. Hamon 2004 (in French). Fouesnant. ISBN 978-2-9521446-1-2.
  - Kervran, Sophie (2006). "Le patrimoine comme passion identitaire en Bretagne : inauguration et destruction du monument de l'union de la Bretagne à la France (Rennes, 1911 et 1932)". Culture & Musées (in French). 8 (8): 91–113.
  - Nicolas, Michel (2007). Coop Breizh (ed.). Histoire de la revendication bretonne: des origines aux années 1980. Nicolas 2007 (in French). Spézet. ISBN 978-2-84346-312-9.
  - Carney, Sébastien (2015). Presses universitaires de Rennes (ed.). Breiz Atao !: Mordrel, Delaporte, Lainé, Fouéré : une mystique nationale (1901-1948) (in French). Rennes. ISBN 978-2-7535-4289-1.
