= Meavenn =

French poet (1911–2001)

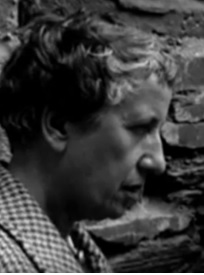
Fant Rozeg Meavenn.jpg

Meavenn (1911–1992) was the pen name of Francine Rozec, also known as Fant Rozec, a Breton language poet, novelist and playwright linked to Breton nationalism.

== Early life and education ==
She was born in Saint Marc, then a village, which is now merged with Brest. She did not speak Breton from birth. She learned the language at the age of twelve from a neighbor. She began her career in Paris where she worked at the Post Office. She studied the Irish language at the Sorbonne and then travelled to Ireland in 1931 to improve her knowledge of the Celtic languages.

== Activism ==
She became involved in Breton nationalism through the clandestine group Gwenn ha du, which planned to blow up a monument in Rennes commemorating the Union of Brittany and France. Known to be close to this organization, she was dubbed La Vierge Rouge ("the Red Virgin") by the press. This was in the brief period in 1932 when the French communist party supported Breton nationalist attacks.

She married Loeiz Andouard in 1935. The couple had three children before their separation in 1944. During World War II she was associated with the collaborationism of other Breton nationalists, working with Roparz Hemon in his Breton-language broadcasts from Radio Rennes Bretagne. At this time she became the lover of Jean-Marie Chanteau, one of the leaders of Bezen Perrot, the pro-German militia affiliated with the SS. She married him on his return to Paris. She fled from Rennes in the Bezen Perrot convoy in July 1944 and lay low with Jean-Marie Chanteau in Paris before fleeing to Ireland. She worked for a charity before returning to live in Paris and Saint-Malo.

In 1977, she appeared in Pierre Perrault's film C'etait un Québécois en Bretagne, madame! along with fellow Breton nationalist Glenmor. Both are portrayed as "poets of dispossession, the voices of a despairing national identity." When a shocked local learns that she was a member of a militant separatist group allied to the Nazis, Meavenn denies that it was ever involved in violence against people.

She died in Saint-Malo in 1992.

== Writings ==
She wrote poetry, short stories and novels. Her major work is the novel "Ar Follez yaouank", set during the Irish War of Independence. It was published under the pseudonym Catherine Beauchamp. It inspired the filmmaker Yves Allégret for his film La jeune folle ("The crazy young", but released in English as Desperate Decision), but its endearing poetry in Breton was not adequately replicated. She writes with a free and rather fantastic style, marked by the use of internal rhyme.

She wrote mainly in the Breton journals Gwalarn, Arvor, Galv, Al Liamm, Combat Breton, and Stur, and participated in the political-cultural magazine Vro Ar-Gwirionez the 1960s and 1970s.

== Publications ==
- Iwerzon dishual - Skol S. Enda; Brest, Gwalarn no 38, genver 1932
- Kanoù en deiz, poems published in Gwalarn n° 53, 1933
- Ar follez yaouank, novella, Gwalarn n° 140, 1941. Rééditée
- Ar Gelted Kozh, Skridou Breiz, Brest, 1943
- Une petite Irlande d'été
