= Gwenn ha du =

Gwenn ha du means white and black in Breton. It is the name of:

- The Flag of Brittany
- A Breton nationalist terrorist organisation, see Gwenn ha du (terrorism)
