= Breiz da Zont =

Breton nationalist periodical active during the 1930s

- Editor: Morvan Lebesque; Théophile Jeusset
- Founded: 1929
- Country: France
- Language: French, Breton

Breiz da Zont (Brittany of the Future), was a Breton nationalist periodical active during the 1930s. It was affiliated to an extremist offshoot of the Breton Autonomist Party.

Initially, Breiz da Zont was the organ of the nationalist grouping known as Parti nationaliste intégral breton (Breton Integral Nationalist Party: PNIB) led by Théophile Jeusset. Morvan Lebesque participated in the drafting committee, and also edited the journal at the request of Jeusset, who was forced to give up for health reasons. The poet Gwilherm Berthou and the composer Paul Ladmirault were members.

== Antisemitism ==
In its early phase the journal was strongly linked to antisemitic and fascist ideology. In an article published in July 1931, Théophile Jeusset wrote:

It is due to our particular resistance to the conquest of sovereign French territory by the corrupting ideas which emanate more or less from the Jews - 'freemasonry', 'secularism' - etc, that the Bretons were decimated during the last world war: over 200,000 of them. It is easy to invoke military explanations for this carnage, but that does not alter the fact the actual organizer of troop dispositions was the Jew Abrahami, born... in the ghetto of Constantinople.

Another issue reproduced the edict of John I, Duke of Brittany declaring the expulsion of Jews from Brittany. An article in August 1931 includes the words "we, complete Breton nationalists, could also qualify us as National Socialist supporters of Adolf Hitler."

== Kentoc'h Mervel ==
In 1929 Gwilherm Berthou suggested to Célestin Lainé that a nationalist militant group dedicated to direct action to should be formed. This was to be called Kentoc'h Mervel (Sooner Death). As Lainé sought his own recruits, Berthou brought the staff of Breiz da Zont to join en masse. When Lainé discovered this he distanced himself from Berthou, believing that a public journal could not create an effective support for a secret organization, as it would be too easily infiltrated. Lainé went on to form Gwenn ha du. Lainé later wrote "I don't know what became of Kentoc'h Mervel after that, except that it never grew beyond fancy words."

== Later developments ==
After the departure of Morvan Lebesque, the journal moved away from fascism towards a more conventional conservatism, monarchism, Breton nationalism and Catholicism.

Théophile Jeusset later went on to found the pro-Nazi Breton Social-National Workers' Movement.
