= Breiz =

Breiz may refer to

== Places ==
- Brittany, the English name for the French region called Breiz in the Breton language

== Publications ==
- Breiz Atao (Brittany for Ever), a Breton nationalist journal of the mid-twentieth century
- Breiz da Zont (Brittany of the Future), a Breton nationalist periodical of the 1930s
- Barzaz Breiz (Ballads of Brittany), a book of Breton songs collected by Théodore Hersart de la Villemarqué and published in 1839
- Feiz ha Breiz (Faith and Brittany), a leading weekly newspaper in the Breton language
