= Théophile Jeusset =

French Nazi collaborator (1910–1968)

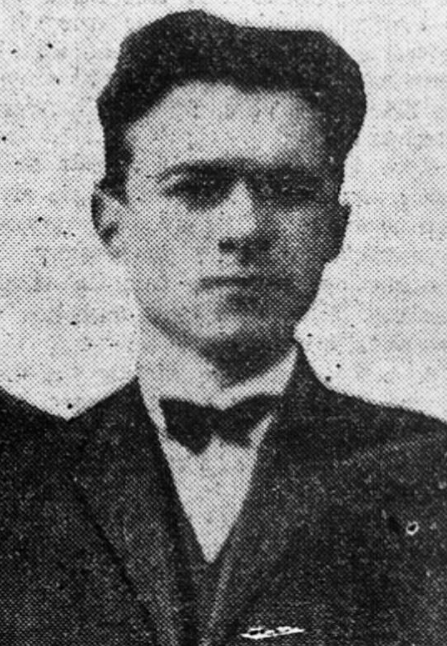
- Born: 25 April 1910; Rennes, France
- Died: 14 May 1968 (aged 58); Nantes, France
- Other name: Jean-Yves Keraudren
- Citizenship: French
- Political party: Breton Autonomist Party; Breton National Party; Breton Social-National Workers' Movement
- Military career
- Allegiance: Nazi Germany
- Branch: Waffen-SS
- Service years: 1940s
- Unit: Bezen Perrot
- Conflicts: World War II

Théophile Jeusset (25 April 1910 – 14 May 1968) was a Breton nationalist writer and fascist political activist. He is also known by his Breton language pseudonym Jean-Yves Keraudren.

Born in Rennes, Jeusset adopted militant Breton nationalism from his youth. Initially associated with the Breton Autonomist Party, Jeusset broke away from it to form the fascistic Breiz da Zont movement and its political wing, the Parti nationaliste intégral breton (Breton Integral Nationalist Party: PNIB). The party was, however, tiny. Jeusset later joined with fellow nationalist extremists Gwilherm Berthou and Célestin Lainé to found Kentoc'h Mervel (Sooner Death), a group dedicated to direct action. Lainé, however, insisted that a more tightly organized group was necessary, going on to create the terrorist cell Gwenn ha du. After Gwenn ha du performed its first violent act, blowing up a sculpture, Jeusset was one of six nationalist militants who were arrested and detained.

Jeusset linked Breton nationalism to antisemitism, writing in 1931:

It is due to our particular resistance to the conquest of sovereign French territory by the corrupting ideas which emanate more or less from the Jews - 'freemasonry', 'secularism' - etc, that the Bretons were decimated during the last world war: over 200,000 of them. It is easy to invoke military explanations for this carnage, but that does not alter the fact the actual organizer of troop dispositions was the Jew Abrahami, born... in the ghetto of Constantinople.

Jeusset was later associated with Olier Mordrel who founded the Breton National Party on the model of the Nazi Party.

During World War II Jeusset broke away from Mordrel to create his own party once more, the Breton Social-National Workers' Movement, but he was unable to obtain many followers. Jeusset eventually joined Lainé's Bezen Perrot militia, which was affiliated to the SS. Captured after the war, Jeusset was sentenced to forced labor for life, albeit he was released from prison in 1951.

In 1965 he published an autobiographical memoir: A Contre-courant (Against the Current).
