= Leo Weisgerber =

German philologist (1899–1985)

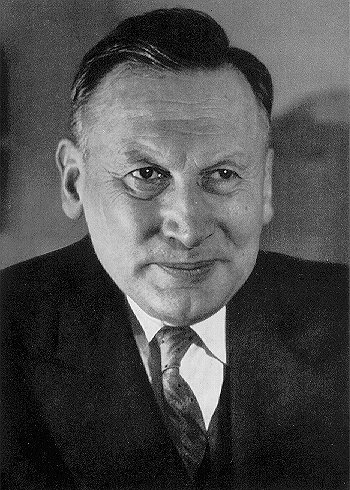
- Born: Johann Leo Weisgerber; 25 February 1899; Metz, German Empire
- Died: 8 August 1985 (aged 86); Bonn, Germany

Academic background
- Education: University of Bonn
- Doctoral advisor: Rudolf Thurneysen

Academic work
- Discipline: Linguistics
- Sub-discipline: Celtic linguistics; Indo-European linguistics
- Institutions: University of Rostock; University of Marburg; University of Bonn
- Notable students: Karl-Otto Apel

Johann Leo Weisgerber (25 February 1899 – 8 August 1985) was a German linguist who also specialized in Celtic linguistics. He developed the "organicist" or "relativist" theory that different languages produce different experiences. He was the son of a village teacher who served as a young man in the German army in Flanders, so he could not return to his home city. During World War II, his pan-Celticist ideology was co-opted to support the German war effort, as did pro-Polish and pro-Czech ideology on the side of the Allies.

== Scholarly career ==
After studying in Bonn (1918–), Weisgerber taught as a professor of general and comparative linguistics at Rostock University (1927–), Marburg University (1938–) and Bonn University (1942–). He was an editor of the journal Wörter und Sachen, which he used as a vehicle for his ideas. After the Second World War he taught mainly in Bonn. He wrote prolifically throughout his career. Among other activities he founded the modern German-language journal Wirkendes Wort and was a co-founder of the Institut für Deutsche Sprache (Mannheim).

== Theory of language ==
Reacting to older linguists' emphasis on form (especially phonology and morphology), Weisgerber initiated what he called inhaltbezogene Grammatik ('content-related grammar'). Starting from the study of translation problems and of colour amnesia, he contributed notably to the theory that language determines and structures our apprehension of reality. This was initially influenced by the structuralist theories of Ferdinand de Saussure, but Weisgerber's theory soon took him far beyond the simple Saussurean linkage of (linguistic) form and (semantic) content. His other debts were to Wilhelm von Humboldt (notably the insight that language diversity implies a diversity of world-views) and Jost Trier (concurrently with whom he developed the structuralist idea of a word-field or lexical field).

Weisgerber argued that each language community has its own perception of the world, different from that of other groups:

- There are words or phrases that are specific to each language community.
- Some concepts may be shared by two (or more) linguistic communities, but with different connotations in each case.
- Each language community structures reality in a different way, according to its own language codes.

In this respect, languages imply a "world view" that can produce sustained cultural differences.

Centrally, Weisgerber contended that each language community was engaged in a process of 'wording the world' (Worten der Welt) by means of its mother tongue. Mediating between the forms (i.e. words and grammatical structures) of a language and the external world, there was a 'linguistic inter-world' (sprachliche Zwischenwelt), which operates directly, indirectly and in part autonomously, in ways peculiar to that language. In acquiring a specific mother tongue, a speaker will also unconsciously acquire and be influenced by its distinctive categorizations and structures. These effects permeate the entire community and shape its perceived world.

From 1925 through into the 1970s, Weisgerber repeatedly cited color terms in support of his views. Categorisation of colour impressions under a small number of generally applicable ("abstract") terms like blau and rot was, for him, the outcome of long evolutionary development, and only a minority of languages had achieved this. Specifically, he found it remarkable that the German language had mastered (bewältigt) the entire world of colour with only eight abstract colour words.

Weisgerber claimed in 1929 to have discovered a significant restructuring in the field of visual impressions. Simplistically, he reported a decline since ancient Germanic times in the verbal expression of colour, with objects nowadays perceived as colour-bearers, not colour-transmitters (Farbträger, nicht Farbsender). Empirical evidence for this has since proved to be contradictory. Better supported, but still in need of verification, was his converse hypothesis of a corresponding historical shift in the expression and perception of Glanz (a term comprising 'shininess', 'radiance' etc.). These non-chromatic light phenomena had earlier been freely rendered adjectivally, but were now mainly expressed in modern German 'Glanzverben' like glänzen and schimmern.

Weisgerber's conception of linguistic relativity was more extreme than that of Benjamin Lee Whorf or Edward Sapir, with whom the theory is most often associated. Resonance in the Anglo-Saxon world was limited partly by Weisgerber's arcane terminology, but more by his French-German ethnic background in an "Americanized scientific community", dominated by structuralist universalists like Noam Chomsky. In Germany he remained a significant figure in German linguistics well into the 1960s, when politically as well as linguistically his views fell into scientific discredit. His theory was then overtaken by new structuralist and universalist approaches from Britain and America, as well as elsewhere in Europe – "history" was out, "structure" was in. One of his pupils, Helmut Gipper, prominently developed his ideas in modified form, in a series of articles and as co-editor of the Duden Grammatik from the late 1950s onwards. Gipper was also influential as co-editor of an extensive bibliography on Sprachinhaltsforschung, as linguistics broadly within the Weisgerber tradition has come to be known.

Weisgerber can be seen as an epigonic scholar of the German idealistic and romantic traditions alike, that insisted on the compatibility of reason and history and did not play off the first contra the latter. That he did not resist narrowing it down to irrational and silly Germanicism/Celtism does not distinguish him from the academic climate of his times.

== Pan-Celticism ==
Before World War II, Weisgerber established links with Celtic nationalists in Ireland, Britain and Brittany, which were seen as a threat to national unity by the respective majority governments (the British Crown and the Centralist French Republic). Some Breton nationalists joined Germany at the beginning of the war. After the Fall of France, Weisgerber initiated the creation of the Institut celtique de Bretagne and directed the radio station Radio Rennes Bretagne (Radio Rennes of Brittany) which broadcast the first radio transmissions in the Breton language, something that most Bretons had been pursuing unsuccessfully for decades.

These ventures, which were supported by the Ahnenerbe, were perceived by the French Resistance as German-sponsored propaganda organizations, which they in fact were, promoting the relationship between language and Volk and supporting Breton autonomy from France. This "augmenting – assumed or real – ethnic fractions in enemy states" was a political tactic supported by the German Society for Celtic Studies, under the remit of the Ahnenerbe. This tactic was used by many wartime states, Weisgerber thus being in line with Lawrence of Arabia, the Germans supporting Irish independence, and the British supporting Polish and Czech independence. The counter-tactic was employed by Soviet leader Joseph Stalin, who deported hundreds of thousands of non-Russians, mostly by means of American military logistics.

After the defeat of the Nazis, Weisgerber assisted the members of the Breton Bezen Perrot SS militia, led by Célestin Lainé, providing them with false papers to allow them to escape to Ireland with the help of other Celticists, a practice that can be seen both critically political and/or humane.

== Selected writings ==
- Zur Grundlegung der ganzheitlichen Sprachauffassung. Aufsätze 1925-1933, ed. by Helmut Gipper, 1964
- Muttersprache und Geistesbildung, 1929 and later editions
- Die Stellung der Sprache im Aufbau der Gesamtkultur, 2 vols., 1933–1944
- Die volkhaften Kräfte der Muttersprache, 1939
- Die Entdeckung der Muttersprache im europäischen Denken, 1948
- Von den Kräften der deutschen Sprache, 4 vols., 1949–1950 and later editions
- Die vier Stufen in der Erforschung der Sprachen, 1963

== See also ==
- Wolfgang Krause
- Jan de Vries
- Bernhard Maier
