= Morvan Lebesque =

Breton nationalist activist and French journalist (1911-1970)

Morvan Lebesque (January 11, 1911 in Nantes, France – 4 July 1970 in Brazil), was the Breton language name of Maurice Lebesque, a Breton nationalist activist and French journalist.

Lebesque was born in Nantes, at the Quai Barbin (now dock Barbusse), and had his secondary education at Clemenceau High School. In 1930, he was editor-in-chief at the Loire Echo. Responsible for the Nantes branch of the Breton Autonomist Party (Parti Autonomiste Breton), Lebesque left the latter in 1931 and founded, with Théophile Jeusset, the more extremist movement Breiz da Zont, and its political wing, the Parti Nationaliste Breton Intégral.

During the German occupation of France in World War II, he worked for the collaborationist newspaper L'Heure Bretonne, then for various journals in Paris, where he met and befriended Jean-Paul Sartre and Simone de Beauvoir.

In 1952, Lebesque joined the satirical journal Le Canard Enchaîné, for which he wrote a popular column, modelling his style on Albert Camus, with whom he became a close friend, and of whom he would later publish a biography. He eventually became an editor of the journal.

After 1966, Lebesque also participated in the Breton autonomist revue Ar Vro.

== Selected works ==
- Un héros de la liberté, Krüger le lion, P., Sorlot, 1941.
- Jacques Cartier, découvreur de la Nouvelle France, P., éd. Denoël, 1942.
- Soldats sans espoir, P., Laffont, 1947.
- La Loi et le Système. P., Le Seuil, coll. L'Histoire immédiate.
- Premières chroniques du Canard, P., Pauvert, 1960.
- Albert Camus par lui-même, P., Le Seuil, coll. Écrivains de toujours, 1963. OCLC 232123
  - published in English as Portrait of Camus: an illustrated biography, Herder and Herder, [New York], [1971]. OCLC 208901
- La Télévision entre les lignes, P., Casterman, 1967.
- Chroniques du Canard, P., Laffont, coll. Libertés, 1968.
- Comment peut-on être Breton ? Essai sur la démocratie française; Le Seuil, coll. L'Histoire immédiate, 1970.

== Bibliography ==
- Morvan Lebesgue au Canard Enchaîné by Yann Férec, June 1997, Université de Bretagne Occidentale, Brest, Masters Dissertation in Modern, 19th century History
