= Jean Boucher (artist) =

French sculptor

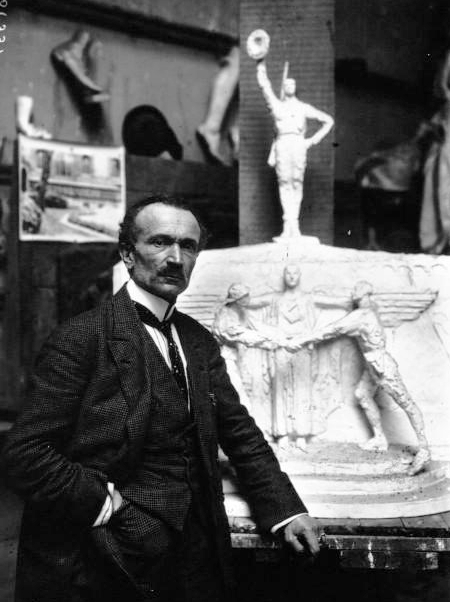
Jean Boucher in 1921, standing in front of his model for the Monument to American Volunteers.

Jean Boucher (20 November 1870 – 17 June 1939) was a French sculptor based in Brittany. He is best known for his public memorial sculptures which communicated his liberal politics and patriotic dedication to France and Brittany.

== Biography ==
=== Early years ===
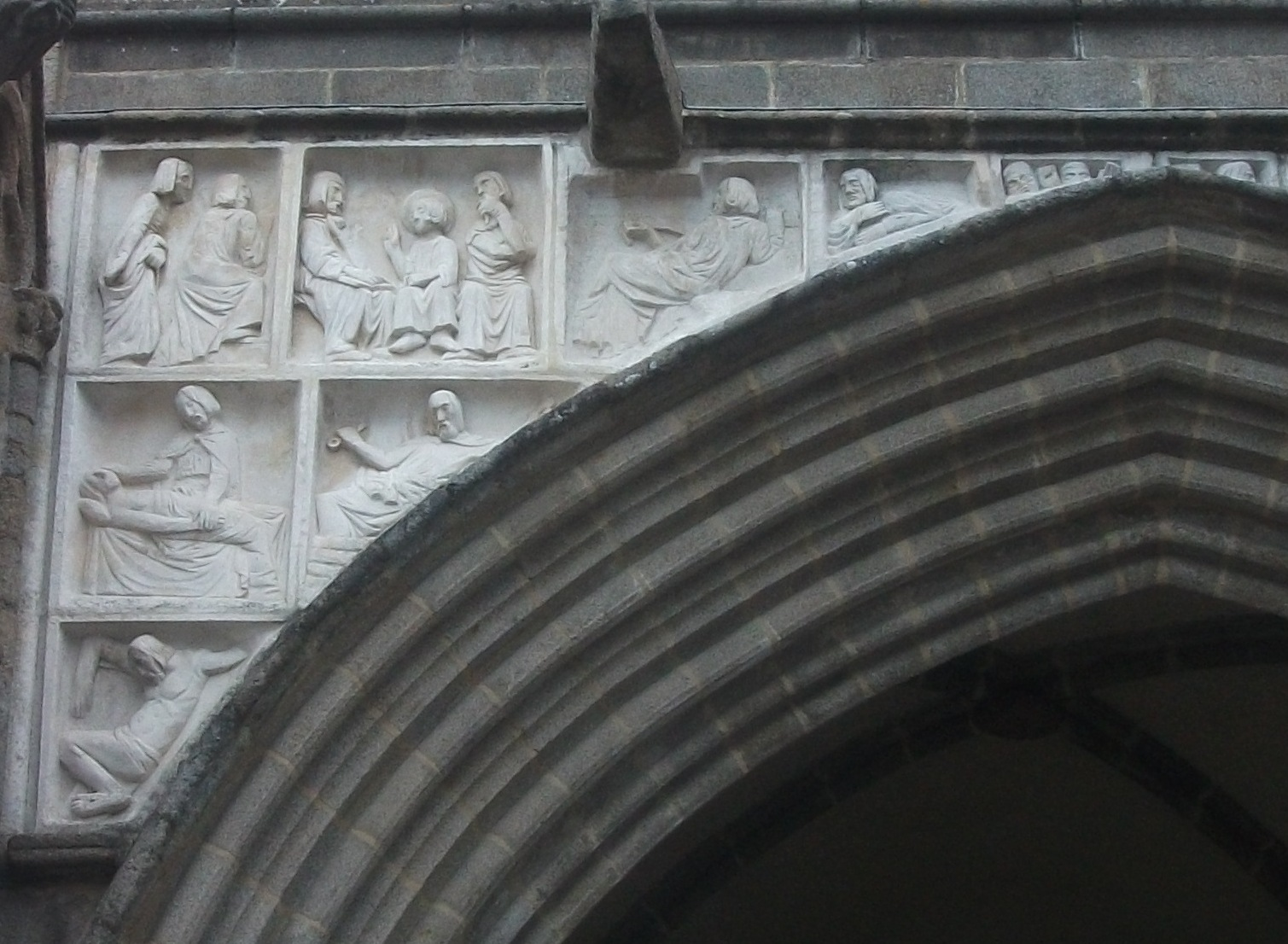
Early sculptures on Biblical topics, Dol Cathedral.

Boucher was born in Cesson-Sévigné near Rennes, Brittany. After his early schooling Boucher learned the trade of a blacksmith, but very soon he was attracted by the arts of drawing and sculpture. Pierre Lenoir, professor at the regional school of Rennes, taught the rudiments of fine art to him, and soon realised his young pupil's aptitude. In the 1890s he worked on restorations for the cathedral of Saint Samson in Dol-de-Bretagne, which he later described as his true school. He obtained a government grant to continue his studies in Paris where he met his mentors Alexandre Falguière at the Ecole des Beaux-Arts, and Henri-Michel-Antoine Chapu of the Académie Julian. Both gave him a respect for truth in sculpture, a product of the wider trend of Realism associated with Jules Dalou and Auguste Rodin.

=== Liberal ideals ===
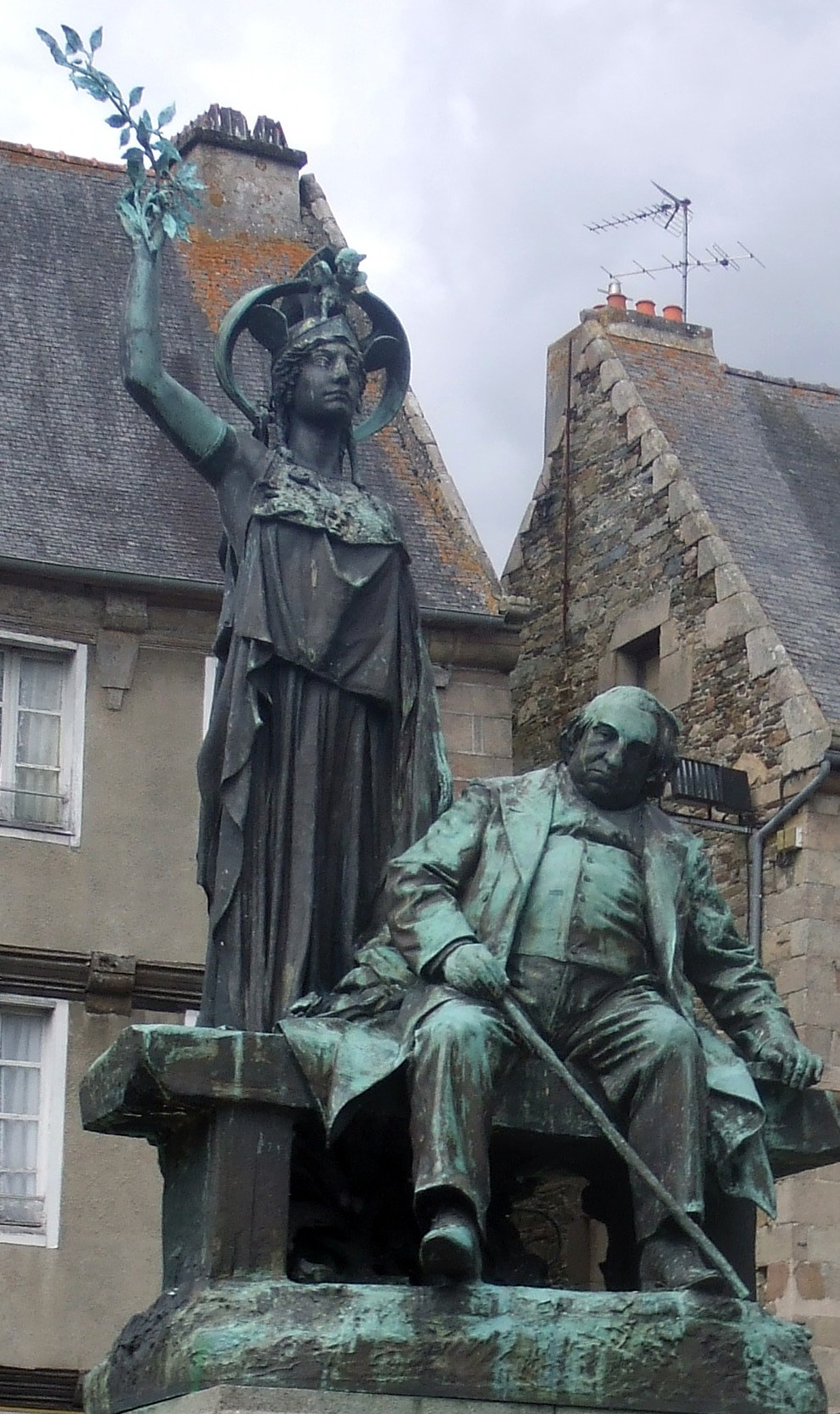
Ernest Renan, Tréguier.

In 1898 Boucher joined the Bleus de Bretagne, an organisation founded to promote liberal values in Brittany. Boucher was described by Armand Dayot as a "Breton, Dreyfusard and freethinker". In this capacity he was commissioned to create a sculpture commemorating the skeptical thinker Ernest Renan in Renan's home town of Tréguier. The sculpture, depicting Renan with the goddess Athena, was immensely controversial, being interpreted as a challenge to Catholicism, especially as it was placed beside the cathedral. Major protests accompanied its installation. Boucher's association with liberal and anti-clerical values led to a commission to depict the liberal hero Victor Hugo in exile on Guernsey, not far from the Breton coast. Hugo is depicted looking out from the island back to France, brooding over his exile, and standing on a rocky outcrop. In 1907 Boucher created a multi-figure memorial to prominent Dreyfus supporter and human rights activist Ludovic Trarieux in Place Denfert-Rochereau, Paris. Another large marble in Paris is at the Place Saint-Ferdinand. It depicts Léon Serpollet in his land speed record winning steam car, surrounded by children enveloped by the steam.

Boucher was also commissioned to create a sculpture allegorically representing the union of Brittany with France. This too created controversy, particularly among Breton nationalists, who resented the union and the erosion of Brittany's distinct culture. They complained that the portrayal of Anne of Brittany was demeaning, as she was shown kneeling to the French king. The Breton Nationalist Party was founded to protest its creation, and in 1932 the sculpture was bombed by Gwenn ha du, a Breton separatist terrorist group led by Célestin Lainé. The date was designed to coincide with anniversary of Breton union with France in 1532. Fragments of the broken work have been preserved.

Boucher also created uncontroversial memorial sculptures to distinguished cultural figures, such as Yves Guyot, Charles Le Goffic and the poet André Rivoire.

=== War memorials ===
Boucher did his duty as a soldier during World War I. Called to bear arms with the rank of sergeant, he ended the war as a lieutenant, winner of the Croix de guerre, and suffering the effects of gassing. Appointed Professor at the l'école des beaux-Arts, he continued to work on his art, devoting much of his time to creating memorials to the soldiers who died for France. He is the creator of the monuments dedicated to the "Saint-Cyriens", to the marshal Joseph Gallieni of Verdun, to the American volunteers (in the Place des États-Unis, Paris), to the aviator Èdouard Mounier and others. As a veteran of the Battle of Verdun, he was also commissioned to create the principal sculpture placed on the memorial to the battle in Verdun itself. He also created the war memorial for the town of Hédé, in which he lived for most of his life after the war.

=== Later career ===
He was elected an official of the Academy des Beaux-Arts on February 29, 1936, to replace Hippolyte Lefèbvre. In his last years Boucher was working on new designs for a replacement for the bombed monument to Breton unity with France. He completed maquettes of more than one proposed design. One of the objections of Breton nationalists to the earlier statue had been that it portrayed the duchess Anne of Brittany kneeling submissively before the King of France, so the new designs carefully stressed the equality of the figures. However, the replacement project was abandoned after Boucher's death and the outbreak of war in 1939. Another of his late projects also remained unfinished, his memorial to Camille Desmoulins and the storming of the Bastille. After his death the stone sculpture was sawn into several pieces for storage. Intended for display in Paris, it was eventually reconstructed and displayed in Boucher's home town of Cesson-Sévigné.

Boucher was a highly respected teacher. Among his pupils were the sculptors Paul Belmondo (father of Jean-Paul Belmondo), Jules-Charles Le Bozec and Francis Renaud.

After Boucher's death, in Paris, his son Jean-Marie Boucher created an association dedicated to preserve interest in his father's work. Following his own death in 2000 a new Association des Amis de Jean Boucher (Friends of Jean Boucher) was formed in Rennes. Its honorary presidents are Jean-Paul Belmondo and Edmond Hervé.

== Major works ==
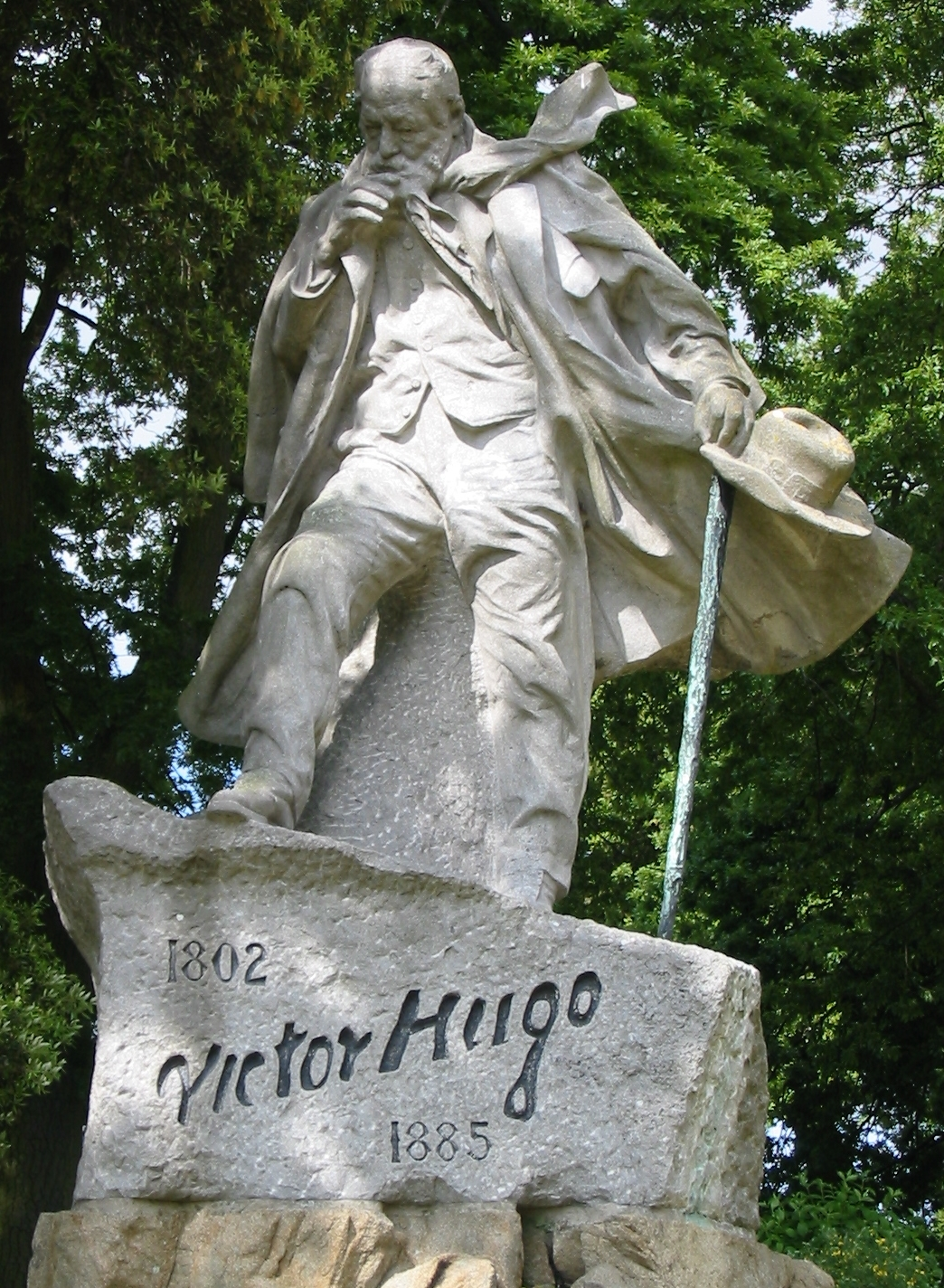
Victor Hugo in exile, Candie, Saint Peter Port, Guernsey

Monument to Ernest Renan in Tréguier (1902).

Two monumental statues of Louis Léopold Ollier, one in his native village, Les Vans, and the other on the Place Ollier in Lyon, which was melted down by German forces for its metal during World War II.

The Union of Brittany and France, in the niche of the town hall of Rennes (1911), partially destroyed on August 7, 1932 by Breton nationalists.

Victor Hugo in exile (1913) in Guernsey. A reduced version of this statue is in the House of Victor Hugo, Hôtel de Rohan-Guéménée, in the IVieme district of Paris.

Monument to the Marshal Joseph Gallieni (1926) in Place Vauban in the XVIIieme district of Paris

Monument to the Marshal Marie Émile Fayolle (1935) in Place Vauban in the XVIIieme district of Paris.

War memorial representing a "Poilu" in the Cour du Mûrier at the École Nationale des Beaux-Arts de Paris.

=== Sculpture parks ===
There are two sculpture parks devoted to Boucher's works, one of which is in his birthplace in Cesson-Sévigné and one in his adopted home of Hédé. The former contains some figures from the destroyed monument to Breton-French unity, along with studies of human heads. The latter contains studies for the Verdun monument and monument to American volunteers. It also contains study heads. His figure La Bretonne, a woman portrayed in local Breton costume, is in the town square.

=== Collection ===
- Musée d'Orsay

== Gallery ==
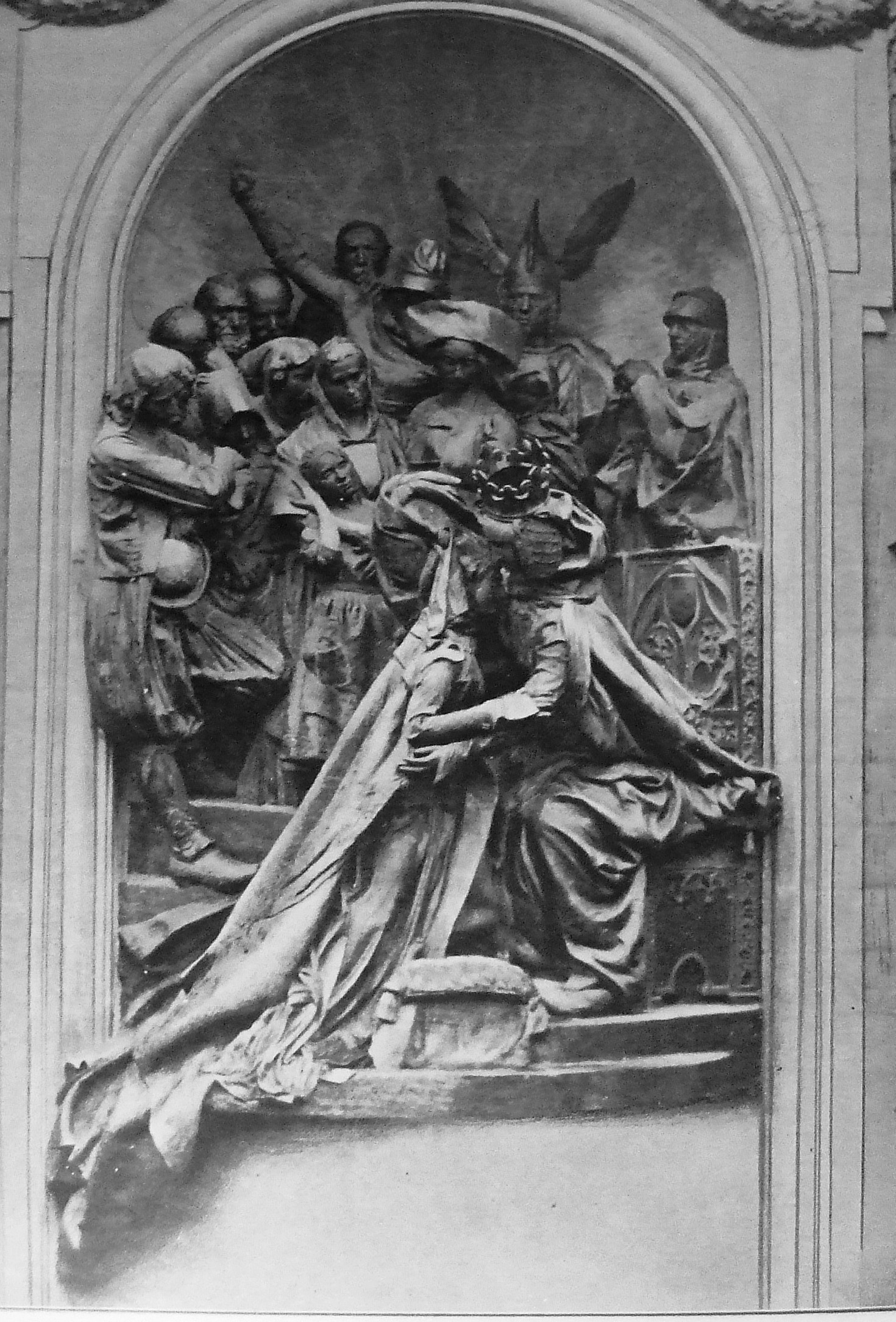
Monument to the Union of Brittany and France.

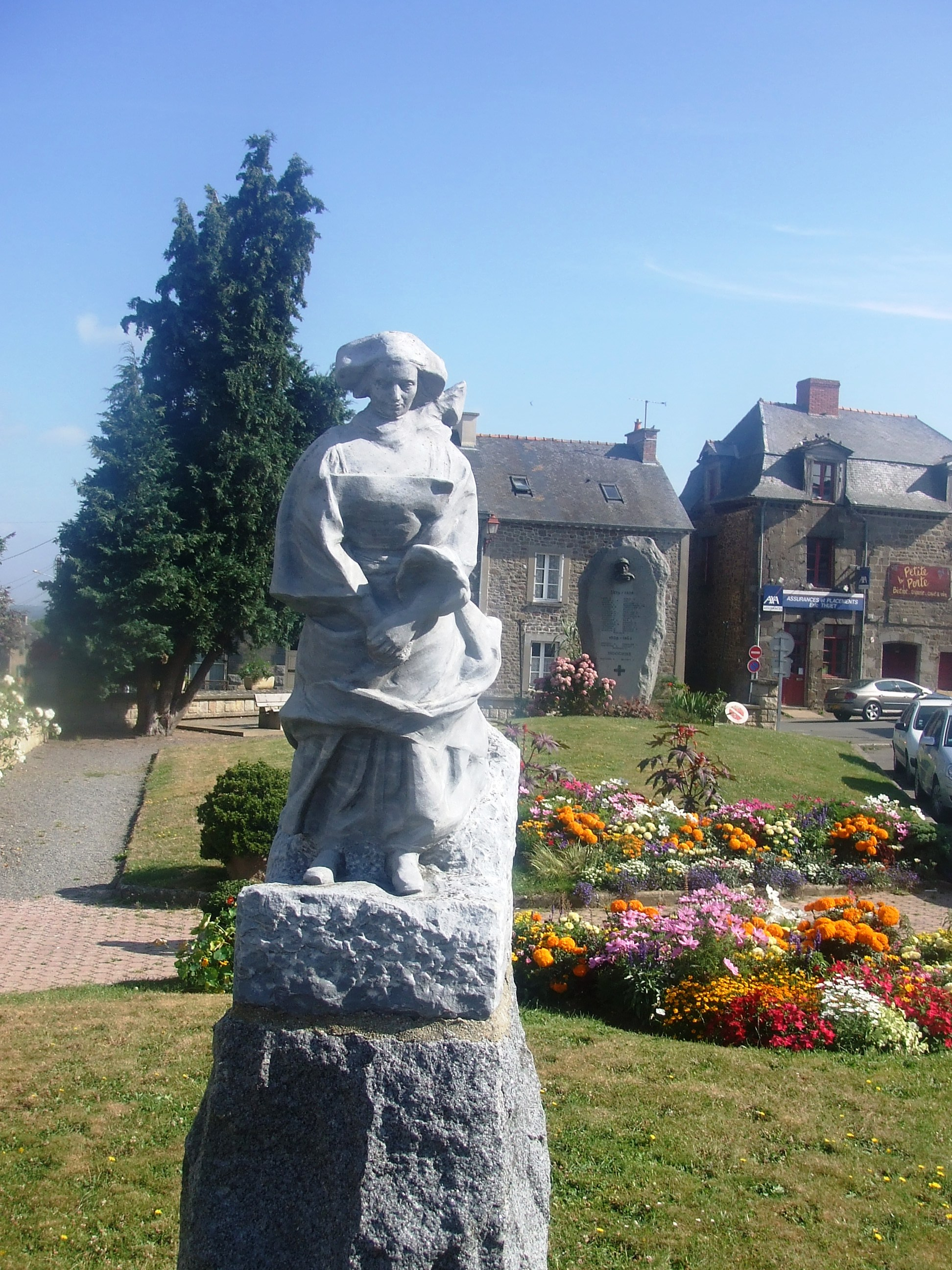
The town centre of Hédé

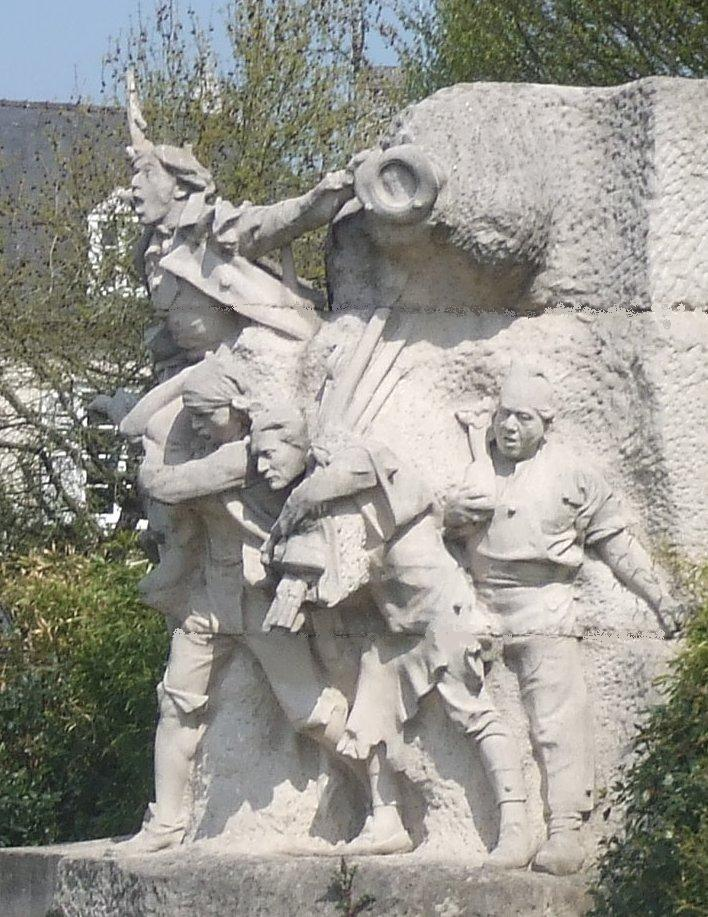
Statue commemorating the storming of the Bastille

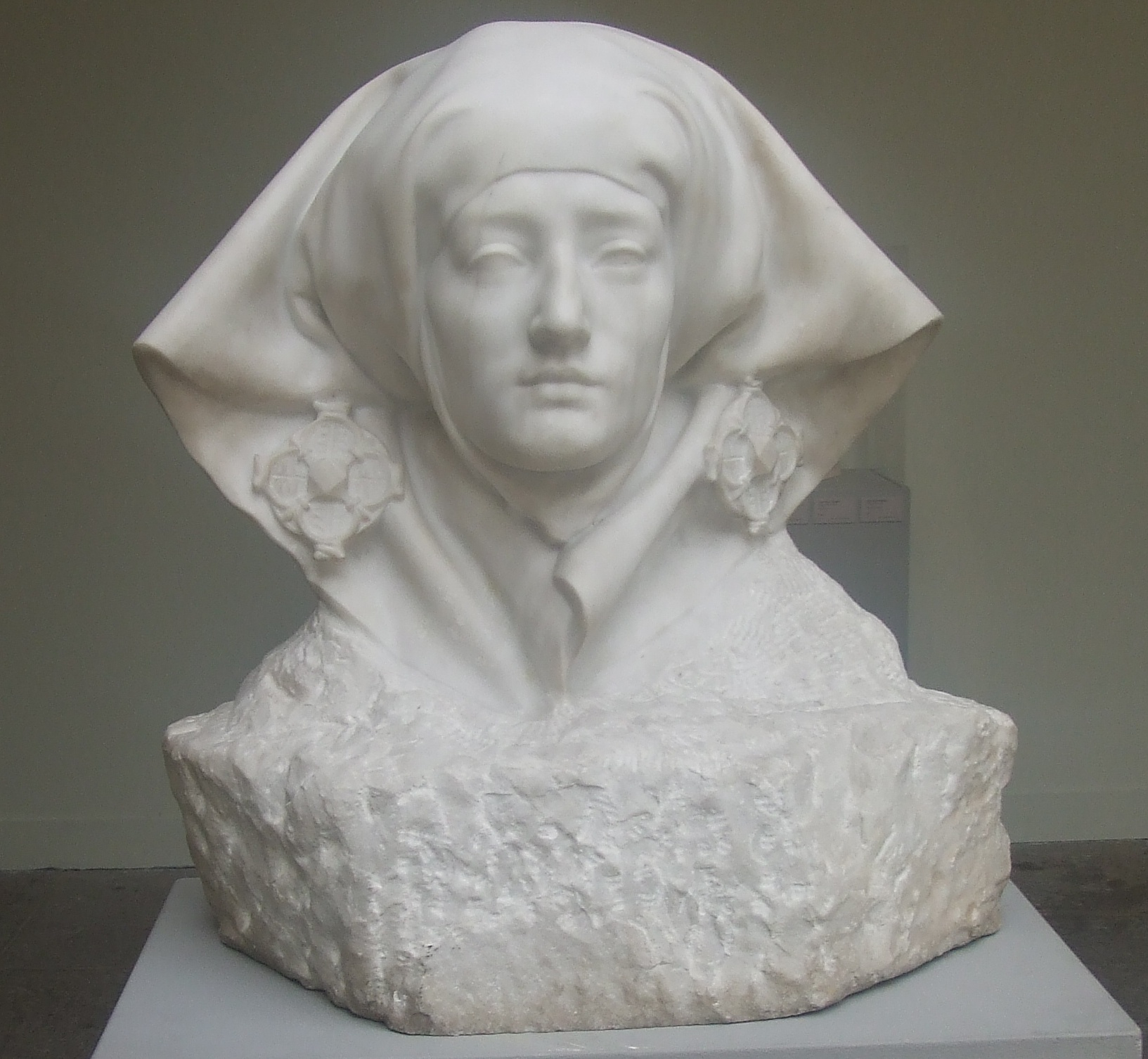
Bust depicting Anne of Brittany.

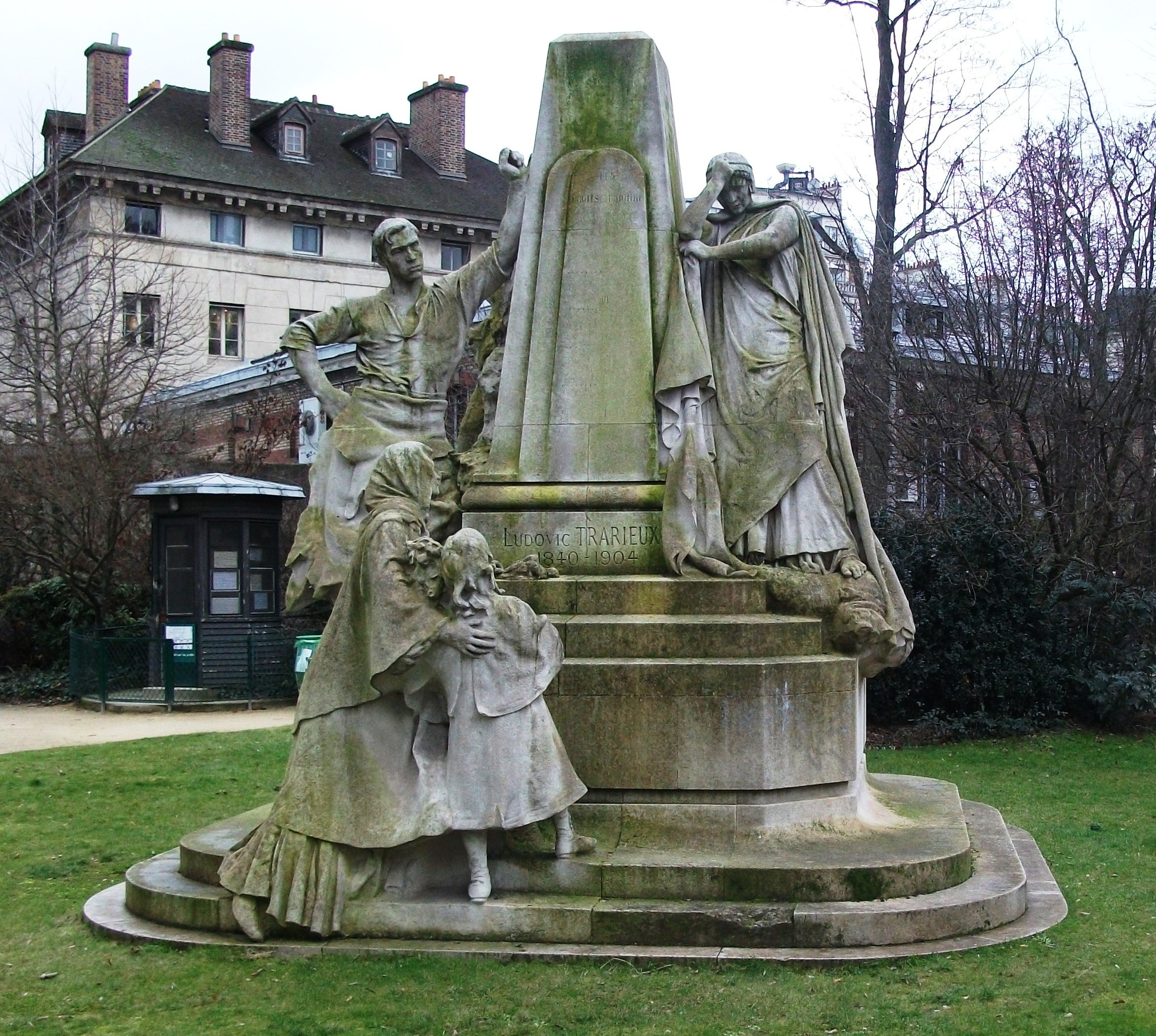
Monument to Ludovic Trarieux, Place Denfert-Rochereau

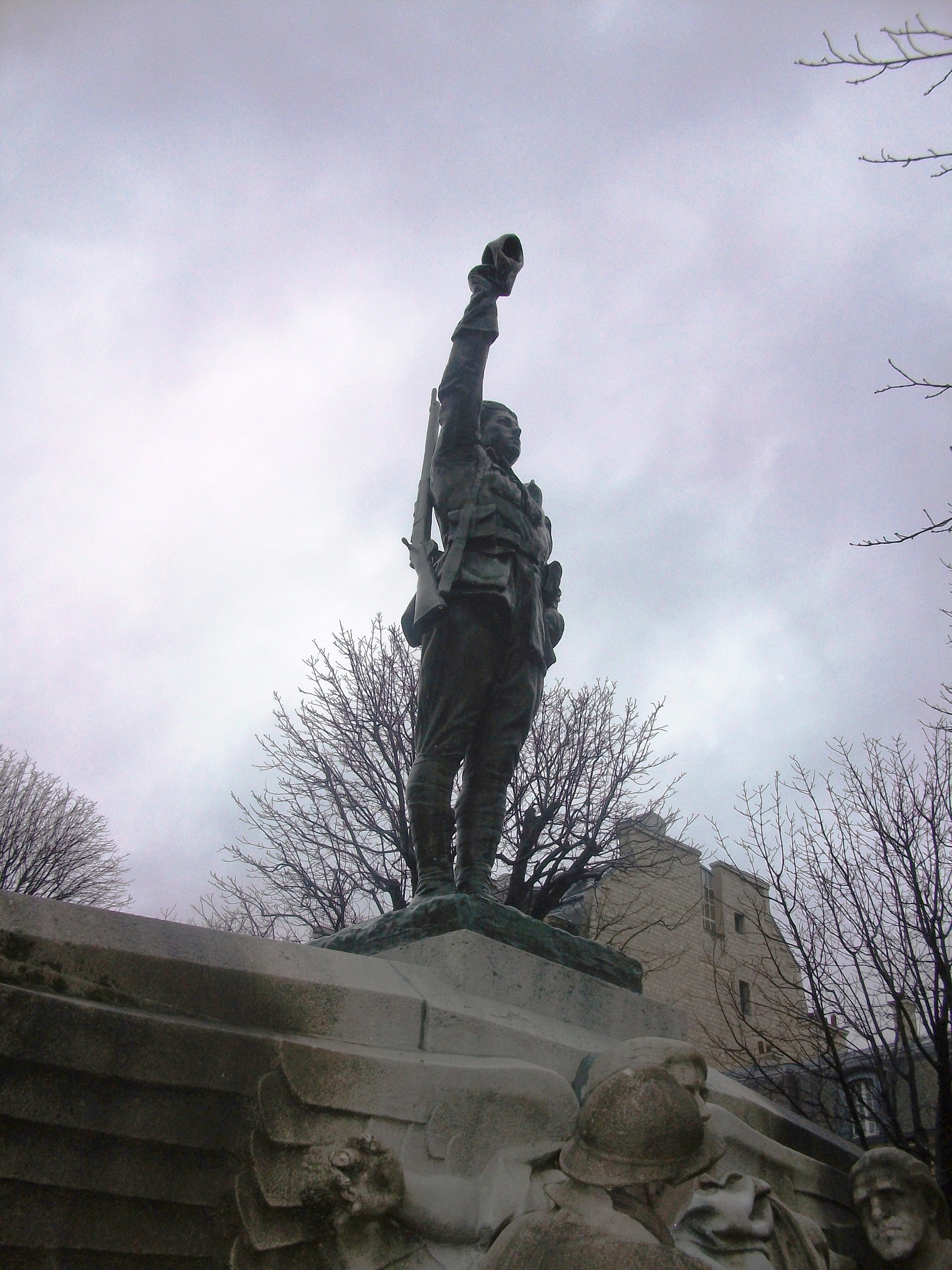
Memorial to American Volunteers, Place des États-Unis, Paris

== Sources ==
=== Bibliography ===
- Funérailles de M. Jean Boucher : le samedi 21 juin 1939 / [Discours de M. George Desvallières,..., M. A. Tournaire, M. Landowski et M. Gasq]; Institut de France, Académie des beaux-arts.
- Notice sur la vie et les oeuvres de Jean Boucher (1870–1939) : lue dans la séance du 13 février 1943 / Louis-Aimé Lejeune; Institut de France, Académie des beaux-arts.

=== External links ===
- Boucher on Gallica-French archives
- Virtual museum of Boucher's work

== See also ==
- Place des États-Unis
- The Saint-Michel cemetery in Saint-Brieuc
