= Gwilherm Berthou =

Breton nationalist and poet

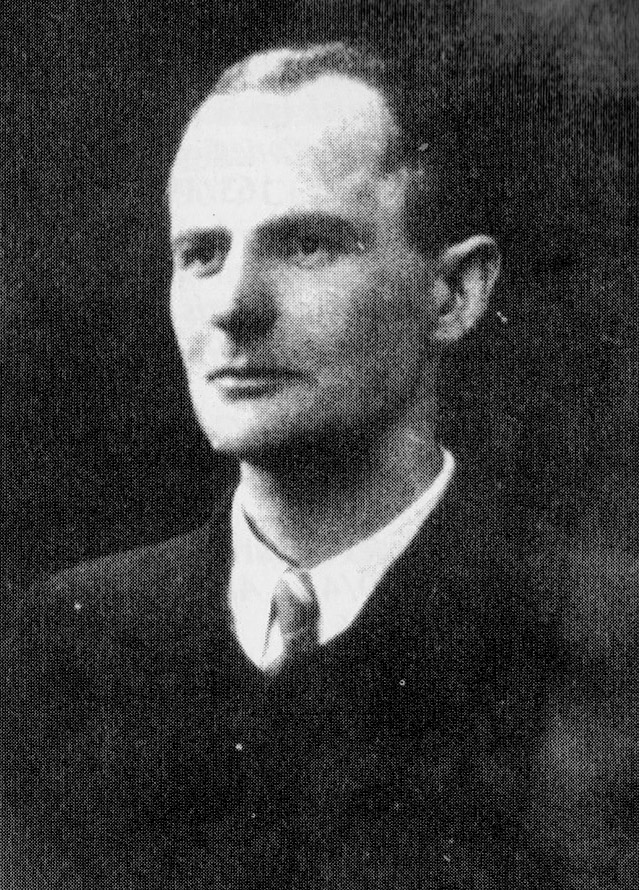
Bertou-Kerverziou

Gwilherm Berthou (10 May 1908, Paimpol – 14 March 1951, Rennes) was a Breton nationalist and neo-Druidic bardic poet. He was a member of the Breton artistic movement Seiz Breur.

== Terrorism ==
Berthou was born in Paimpol, Côtes-d'Armor. He trained as a chemical engineer, then worked full-time as a pharmacist at Guipavas. In 1929 he suggested to fellow chemist and Breton nationalist Célestin Lainé that a militant group dedicated to direct action against the French state and its symbols should be formed. This was to be called Kentoc'h Mervel (Rather Death). As Lainé sought his own recruits, Berthou brought the staff of the nationalist journal Breiz da Zont to join en masse. When Lainé discovered this he distanced himself from Berthou, believing that a public journal could not create an effective support for a secret organization, as it would be too easily infiltrated. Lainé went on to form the terrorist faction Gwenn ha du. Lainé later wrote "I don't know what became of Kentoc'h Mervel after that, except that it never grew beyond fancy words."

However, when Gwenn ha du launched their first attack in 1932, bombing a sculpture, four informants claimed that Berthou had provided the nitroglycerin.

== Neo-Druidism ==
Berthou became closely associated with neo-Druidic and Celticist movements, writing poetry in the Breton language. As part of the Aryanist ideologies of the era, he studied the links between ancient Celtic (Brythonic and Gaelic) culture and Hinduism. His esoterism linked him with various Masonic and Aryanist groups. Along with Morvan Marchal and others he participated in the Kredenn Geltiek (Celtic Creed) Druidic group, adopting the bardic name Kerverziou, though also using the pseudonym "Iaktimagos Vissurix". He contributed to the Celticist journals Gwalarn and Kad. He also founded the periodical Ogam and was president of Les Amis de la Tradition Celtique (Friends of the Celtic Tradition).

In his metaphysical poetry written in "ancient Gallic", he predicted the end of the "white race" in the year 2018, a date which corresponded to 3888 in his own personal calendar, which he created based on the cycles of the moon and sun, starting with the supposed date of the legendary Irish Battle of Mag Tuired.

== Collaborationism ==
Berthou's mystical Aryanist ideas were closely linked to aspects of Nazi ideology. He contributed to the openly pro-Nazi review Stur, edited by Olier Mordrel, and also contributed to other pro-Nazi periodicals. During the war he was involved with the Institut Celtique, created by the Occupation government. Nevertheless, Berthou's involvement remained purely literary.
