= Bezen Perrot =

Collaborationist unit in German-occupied France during World War II

Breton SS Armed Formation "Bezen Perrot"
- Bretonische Waffenverband der SS
- Active: 1943–1945
- Allegiance: Nazi Germany
- Branch: Waffen-SS; Sicherheitsdienst
- Type: Intelligence service
- Size: 80 (maximum strength)
- Engagements: World War II; Western Front; Anti-partisan operations in France; Battle of Normandy

Commanders
- Notable commanders: Célestin Lainé

The Bezen Perrot (Breton; lit. '"Perrot Unit"'), officially the Breton SS Armed Formation (German: Bretonische Waffenverband der SS) was a small collaborationist unit established by Breton nationalists in German-occupied France during World War II. It was made up of personnel from Lu Brezhon, a Breton nationalist militia, under the leadership of Célestin Lainé.

The unit became operational in January 1944 and participated in the arrest of French Jews, labour service evaders, and resistance members in Brittany under the leadership of the German Sicherheitsdienst (SD) secret police as well as a number of mass murders of civilians. From August 1944, following the Allied landings in Normandy, it was gradually withdrawn easterwards into France and then Nazi Germany where it was dissolved in the aftermath of the German surrender. Part of the group, including Lainé, managed to evade arrest, while others were imprisoned or executed in the post-war pursuit of wartime collaborators. Bezen Perrot left a legacy of brutality, hampering attempts to form an independent Breton state.

== Background ==
=== Breton nationalism ===
Brittany became part of France in 1536. Although it was gradually integrated into the French nation-state, it retained a distinct sense of ethnic and linguistic identity which was increasingly emphasised by local folklorists and historians in the 19th century. The survival of the Breton language, which was actively discouraged by the French education system, became a subject of contention. By 1914, the Breton language had been embraced by the region's intellectuals who used it creating a literary revival. The language issue, however, failed to reach the masses.

Nationalist activity ceased during World War I in which many nationalists fought in the French Army. However, the movement was revived by the periodical Breiz Atao ("Brittany Forever") founded in 1919. In 1923, it adopted Pan-Celticist ideals, drawing a line between Gauls and Bretons, and arguing that the traditionally federal Bretons were oppressed by the autocratic rulers of France. Support was to be sought instead in the north; the Easter Rising and the Irish War of Independence were portrayed as the implementations of a successful formula that was to be emulated should France find itself in dire straits. The incorporation of Alsace-Lorraine into France as a consequence of Germany's defeat in World War I, led to the creation of an Alsatian autonomist movement that opposed the French imposition of laïcité ("secularism"). In 1928, Breizh Atao established contacts with the Alsace-Lorraine Party, which in turn facilitated the spread of Nordism and Völkisch ideology into Breton nationalist circles. Ties with the ethnically German Alsatians strengthened and with them the idea of accepting Abwehr (German military intelligence) assistance, which was already being provided to the Flemish and Alsatian separatists alike.

=== Interwar radicalization ===
The flag of Brittany, created as a Breton nationalist symbol in 1923 and widely adopted in following years

Inspired by the message of Breizh Atao, in 1930 Célestin Lainé, a reserve artillery officer, gathered a small group of companions to found Gwenn ha du, a paramilitary group advocating the creation of an independent Breton state through direct action. In August 1932, Gwenn ha du blew up a 21-year-old monument dedicated to the union of Brittany and France. Lainé was arrested, however, he was released after a former coworker provided him with an alibi. Gwenn ha du attracted the support of many young nationalists who had become disillusioned with the failure of mainstream political parties to gain ground in formal elections. Gwenn ha du ceased its operations between 1933 and 1936, while Lainé was working at the Kuhlmann plant in Loos, French Flanders. There, he established links with Flemish nationalists, who introduced him to Gerhard von Tevenar, an Abwehr agent, who converted Lainé to Nordic neopaganism. Lainé returned to Brittany in 1937, relegating Gwenn ha du the responsibility of sabotage and forming Kadevernn a group that was intended to be the nucleus of a Breton national army. Lainé's most trusted supporters from the two groups were placed in Service Spécial, a secret special operations unit.

In November 1938, two Service Spécial members departed for Germany under the pretext of pursuing a degree in Celtic Studies at the University of Rostock. Their actual mission involved establishing contact with Abwehr's Department II, which was tasked with organising subversive activities abroad. Lainé and Gwenn ha du chief of operations Herve Helloco followed in July 1939. In early August, a crate containing 50 kilograms (110 lb) of Breton nationalist propaganda and seditious slogans such as Why Die for Danzig? washed up at Saint Aubin, Jersey. British police informed their French colleagues of the incident, prompting the surveillance of Breton radicals. Six members of Service Spécial were arrested, but a five-month interrogation failed to produce any incriminating evidence leading to their release. A shipment of arms, munitions and propaganda material was delivered successfully and hidden in caches with the help of Scrignac priest Jean-Marie Perrot.

=== Outbreak of World War II ===
On 3 September, France declared war on Germany and entered World War II. On 20 October, Breton nationalist parties were suppressed, and their property was confiscated as enemy goods. Lainé was recalled into the army, promptly convicted of sowing defeatism within his unit, and sentenced to five years of imprisonment by a military tribunal. Other nationalists followed his orders, defecting to the Germans at any suitable opportunity. Abwehr and Ahnenerbe set up separate concentration camps for Breton prisoners of war. Recruits from the camps were employed in the establishment of Breiz Radio, a propaganda radio station transmitting messages in Breton. Upon France's defeat, Lainé was freed by his comrades fleeing to Pontivy. Kadevernn was renamed Lu Brezon (Breton Army). Its members took part in drills and studied Lainé's syncretic neopagan religion and the doctrines of Celto–Nordism. On 24 October 1940, Adolf Hitler installed Philippe Pétain as the head of state of Vichy France in the Montoire Agreement, abandoning the idea of an independent Breton state to ensure French cooperation. Lu Brezon was partially disarmed, while the separatist leaders of the Breton National Party were replaced with autonomists.

The German invasion of the Soviet Union in June 1941 prompted many French communists to join the French Resistance, augmenting its presence in Brittany significantly. The majority of Breton nationalists adopted a neutral stance, refusing to join French collaborationist units such as the Legion of French Volunteers Against Bolshevism, while sharing their hatred of what they perceived as a worldwide Judeo-Bolshevist conspiracy. In the meantime, Breton nationalists became targets of a guerilla campaign waged by Francs-Tireurs et Partisans (FTP) who continued to view them as traitors. The first such killing took place on 4 September 1943, with the shooting of Yann Bricler, a relative of Breton nationalist Olier Mordrel. Lainé decided to aid the Germans in their anti-partisan operations directly, hoping for a change in policy regarding the question of Breton independence. He believed that the mere presence of a purely Breton force would inspire others to join his cause.

== Bezen Perrot ==
=== Operations in Brittany, 1943–44 ===
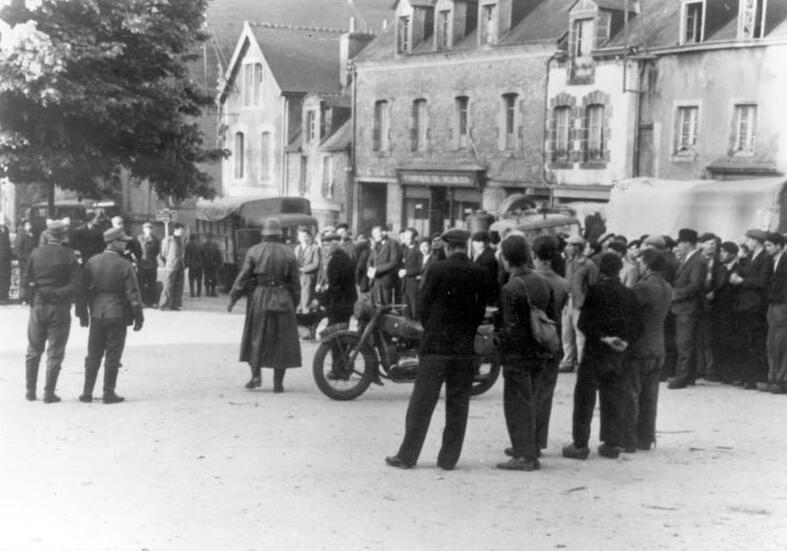
Roundup of French civilians in Le Faouët, Brittany, by German soldiers in July 1944

On 11 November 1943, Lainé transformed Lu Brezon into Bezen Kadoudal, named after Georges Cadoudal, one of the leaders of the royalist Chouannerie uprising of 1794–1800. Bezen Kadoudal was placed under the supervision of Sicherheitsdienst (SD) (S.S. Intelligence) Obersturmbannführer Hartmut Pulmer, and under the military command of Hauptscharführer Hans Grimm. Its headquarters were located at 7 Rue de Vincennes, Rennes. Its initial 33 members were recruited from a variety of Breton nationalist organisations, some of which had already served in collaborationist militias. Terms of enlistment specified that it would only engage French opponents within the borders of Brittany. On 15 December, Bezen Kadoudal was renamed as Bezen Perrot (Perrot Unit), in honour of Jean-Marie Perrot who had been assassinated by a communist résistant several days earlier. German documents record it under the name Bretonische Waffenverband der SS. At top strength, the unit numbered 80 members—the pseudonyms of 65 of whom are recorded. Pseudonyms were used to protect the members' identities. It was headed by Lainé, and his assistants, field commander Ange Péresse and Jean Chanteau, the individual responsible for intelligence.

Bezen Perrot began operations in January 1944. It was employed initially on guard and surveillance duty around German installations. It took part in the arrests of Jews, labour service evaders, and members of the resistance. Their knowledge of the Breton language was prized, enabling the German authorities to intercept arms drops and infiltrate Breton resistance networks which used it to encode their communications. In March, their civilian clothing was replaced by the uniform of the Waffen-SS that lacked any Breton insignia. They were armed with submachine guns and operated in conjunction with the French collaborationist Selbstschutz Polizei. On 7 February 1944, it took part in the arrests of 37 suspected maquisards of whom 12 were later sent to concentration camps. The summer months of 1944 were marked by an increase in resistance activities. Between 16 May and 23 July, Bezen Perrot took part in 14 counter-insurgency operations. The most notable of them was a fire fight between Free French commandos and Bezen Perrot members in the vicinity of Ploërdut on 13 June which resulted in two deaths and one injury (Alan Heusaff) on the side of the collaborationists. On 19 June, Bezen Perrot participated in the arrest and forced disappearance of three resistance fighters. On 3 July, it executed 31 people in the village of Locminé. Five were deported to Germany and four more to the Mauthausen-Gusen concentration camp where they were exterminated. On 7 July, a month after the Normandy landings, Hitler ordered the liquidation of all partisans and resistance fighters. On 14 July, 57 partisans were massacred in the village of Saint-Hilaire. Several days later, six female resistance fighters were shot in the chapel of Quistinic.

=== Retreat and disbandment, 1944–45 ===
Maps of the operations of the Bezen Perrot in Brittany, showing raids in yellow and mass killings in red

In early August 1944, as Allied troops continued their advance from the north, Bezen Perrot was evacuated from Rennes, joining the Germans in their retreat to the east. During the unit's stay in Paris, Chanteau deserted, causing others to follow his example. Three of the deserters later defected to the French Forces of the Interior, fighting in the Liberation of Paris. On 15 August, Bezen Perrot was stationed in Creney-près-Troyes where it participated in the execution of 49 suspected maquisards. It passed through Strasbourg in October, reaching Tübingen in December. On 16 December, the unit celebrated the first anniversary of its formation. Lainé and Péresse were promoted to Untersturmführer and Sturmscharführer, respectively. 18 other members received promotions and decorations owed to them. On 29 December, Lainé reorganized the unit into four groups of eight to ten men. The first group joined the Waffen-SS, the second and third groups were dispatched to the Black Forest where they received sabotage and radio operation training. The fourth group consisted of members who were unsuitable for all other tasks, a self-proclaimed propaganda section. The continued Allied pressure forced the 2nd and 3rd Groups to relocate to Fürstenfeldbruck on 25 April 1945. The staff of Bezen Perrot moved to Marburg in the same month. As Germany's defeat seemed imminent, members were instructed to return to Brittany and go into hiding in areas where it was unlikely they would be recognised. Those who had not joined the Waffen-SS were left to fend for themselves.

== Aftermath ==
Germany finally surrendered on 11 May 1945, in the French occupation zone. Lainé stayed at a farm in the vicinity of Marburg until he was provided with false papers by Celtologist Leo Weisgerber, allowing him to escape to the Republic of Ireland in 1947 where he received asylum. During épuration légale, 27 Breton nationalists were condemned to death and executed, the majority of them were members of Bezen Perrot. Still, the core members of the organisation evaded arrest, staying back in France and Germany, or fleeing to Brazil, Spain, Argentina and Ireland. A few returned to Brittany in the 1950s to face trial. Despite its small size, Bezen Perrot left a legacy of brutality and wartime atrocities that stigmatised the entire Breton nationalist movement. Dozens of relatively moderate Breton autonomists and regionalists received sentences of between five and ten years of imprisonment. It was not until the 1960s that organisations such as the Breton Revolutionary Army revived armed struggle as a means of pursuing Breton independence, albeit on the opposite fringe of the political spectrum.

== See also ==
- Carlingue - French Gestapo auxiliaries
- Special Brigades
- Raymond Davies Hughes
- Louis Feutren
- Irish Republican Army–Abwehr collaboration in World War II
