= Célestin Lainé =

Breton nationalist and Axis collaborator (1908–1983)

- Neven Hénaff
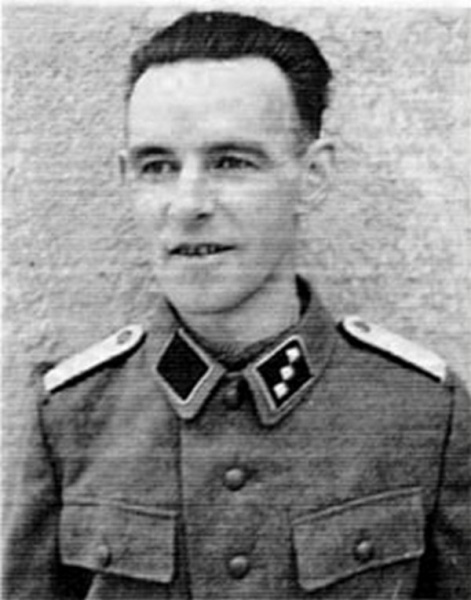
- Célestin Lainé in 1944
- Born: 25 October 1908; Nantes, France
- Died: 7 October 1983 (aged 74); Ireland
- Education: École Centrale Paris
- Military career
- Allegiance: Bretons; Nazi Germany
- Branch: Militia
- Commands: Bezen Perrot
- Conflicts: Second World War
- Other work: Chemical engineer

Célestin Lainé (25 October 1908 – 7 October 1983) was a Breton nationalist and collaborator during the Second World War who led the SS affiliated Bezen Perrot militia. His Breton language name is Neven Hénaff. He was a chemical engineer by training. After the war he moved to Ireland.

== Breton nationalism ==
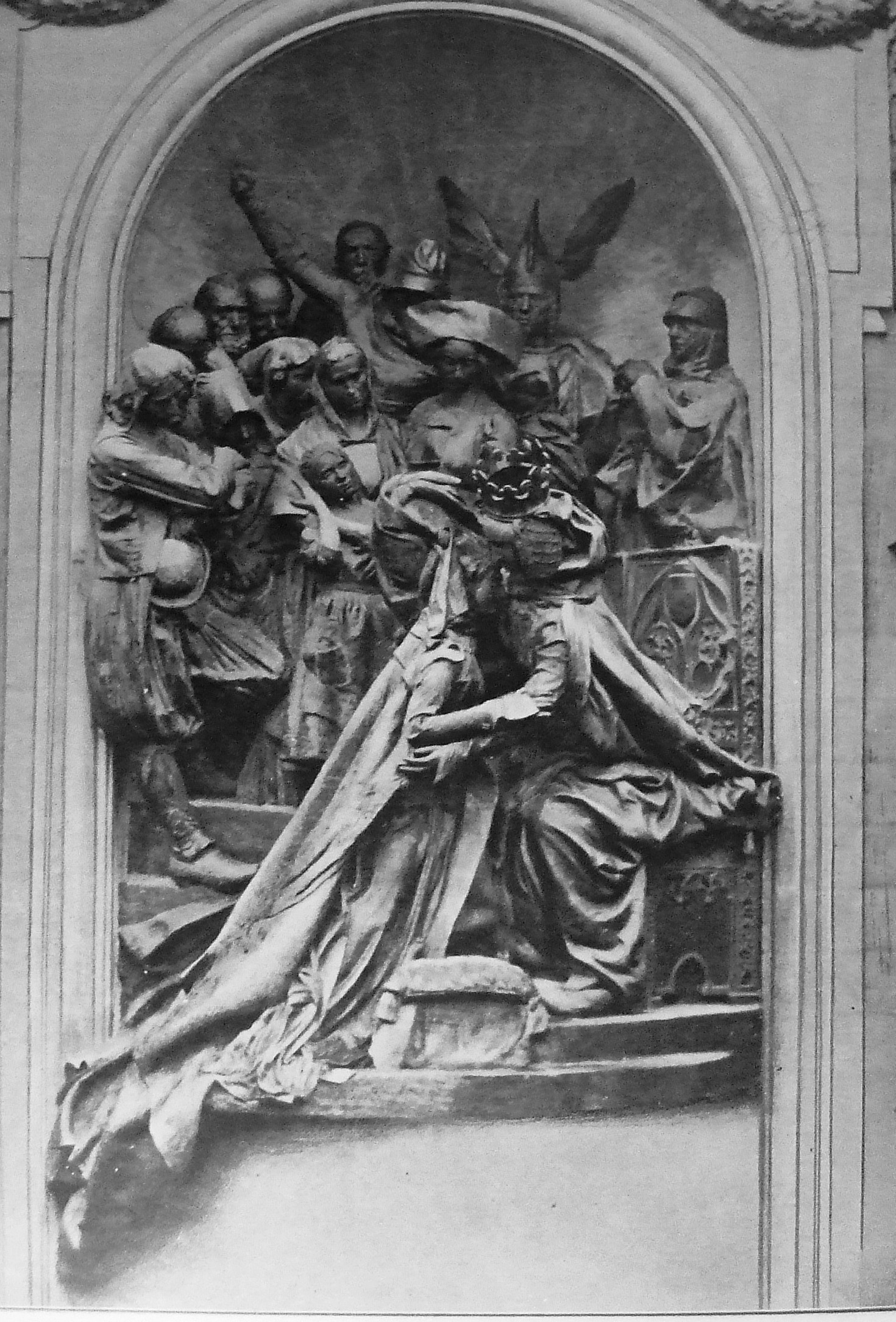
the Monument to the Union of Brittany and France, destroyed by Lainé in 1932.

He was born in 1908 in Nantes and was brought up in Ploudalmézeau, Finistère. He later entered the École Centrale. He became closely linked to Guillaume Berthou, a fellow chemist and Breton separatist. Contrary to myth, he denied any involvement with the secret society Kentoc'h Mervel (Sooner Death), formed by Berthou in 1929, though Berthou had approached him to join. Instead, in 1930 he set up with Hervé Le Helloco the paramilitary organisation, Gwenn ha du ('white and black'). It was named after the colours of the flag of Brittany, designed by Morvan Marchal in 1925. Lainé published an article summarizing its creed under the title Nos deux bases, Irlande et Prusse (Our two models: Ireland and Prussia), referring to the revolutionary zeal of the IRA and the authoritarian discipline of Prussian militarism. The gang perpetrated several bombings. Lainé claimed he made the first bomb in his bedroom from nitroglycerin in a condensed milk carton with a detonator supplied by a forestry worker.

Kristian Hamon claims it was not he but fellow nationalist André Geffroy who placed the bomb which blew up Jean Boucher's statue depicting the Unity of Brittany and France in Rennes. It happened on the morning of 7 August 1932. According to Hamon, Geffroy placed the bomb on the monument, which portrayed the duchess Anne of Brittany kneeling before King Charles VIII of France.

Two people were crossing the Town Hall Square at the time but they subsequently refrained from saying what they had seen, despite the offer of a reward. The explosion tore the mass of bronze from its niche and smashed it on the ground. All the windows within a hundred metres were shattered. Parts of the sculpture have been preserved.

In 1936 Lainé created the Kadervenn (Combat tool), a paramilitary unit based on the IRA model, comprising a dozen members engaged in military manoeuvres. This organisation instructed new recruits and in 1938 participated in exercises in the Landes de Lanvaux, a belt of heath and woodland north of Vannes. The following year he spent a period in Germany where he organized the delivery of a batch of arms, which was shipped on board the ship Gwalarn. However, the ship beached at Locquirec in the night of the 8th and 9 August 1939. The arms were recovered and stored in the abbey at Boquen.

== Collaboration ==
Before and during the Second World War, Lainé sided with the Germans. He favoured aggressive tactics and sought to establish a distinct Breton army to work with the Nazis against the French state. ("We will continue the tradition of those who, throughout the centuries, have struggled, arms in hand, to affirm our national rights.") With Yann Goulet he participated in the creation of the Bagadou Stourm (Stormtroopers). He also set up a unit of volunteers that he controlled personally, called the Service Spécial (or Lu Brezhon in Breton). This paramilitary unit was in charge of the maintenance of order within the Breton National Party.

In 1941, Lainé helped to oust Olier Mordrel from the leadership of the Breton National Party when it became evident that the Germans objected to his strident anti-Vichy position. There followed a split between the Bagadou Stourm and the Service Spécial, as Lainé became increasingly close to the Nazis. On the 11 September 1943, at Rennes, he and Colonel Hartmut Pulmer (chief of the Sicherheitsdienst at Rennes) signed the foundation convention of a new unit to be called Bezen Kadoudal, named after the Breton rebel Georges Cadoudal. In 1944 it took the new name Bezen Perrot (Perrot Militia), the name referring to Abbé Perrot, a parish priest and ardent defender of the Breton language who had recently been assassinated by the French Resistance. His group brought together around a hundred people; his deputy was Alan Heusaff. In 1943, the organisation functioned as an auxiliary police force for the Nazis fighting against the Resistance. The soldiers of Bezen Perrot enrolled in the Waffen-SS, wearing SS field-uniforms. In May 1944, he symbolically founded a new Breton national party on extreme nationalist lines. At the Liberation of France, these collaborationist activities brought opprobrium on the whole of the Breton movement.

== Exile ==
Hunted out of Brittany after the defeat of the Nazis, the last fighters of this unit found themselves at Tübingen, from which many stayed in Germany under false identities, assisted by Leo Weisgerber. Sentenced to death in absentia, Lainé fled to Ireland who had been neutral during the war, there he lived in various locations, including in County Dublin and at Oranmore in County Galway, until his death in 1983.

Olier Mordrel, co-founder of the Breton National Party, wrote that Lainé "was a strange man. He had become the prophet of a Celtic religion made for himself, where Nordic racism was married to the Nietzschian will to power, and not without flirting with an air of romantic druidism".
