= Union of the Duchy of Brittany with the Crown of France =

1491 unification via royal marriage

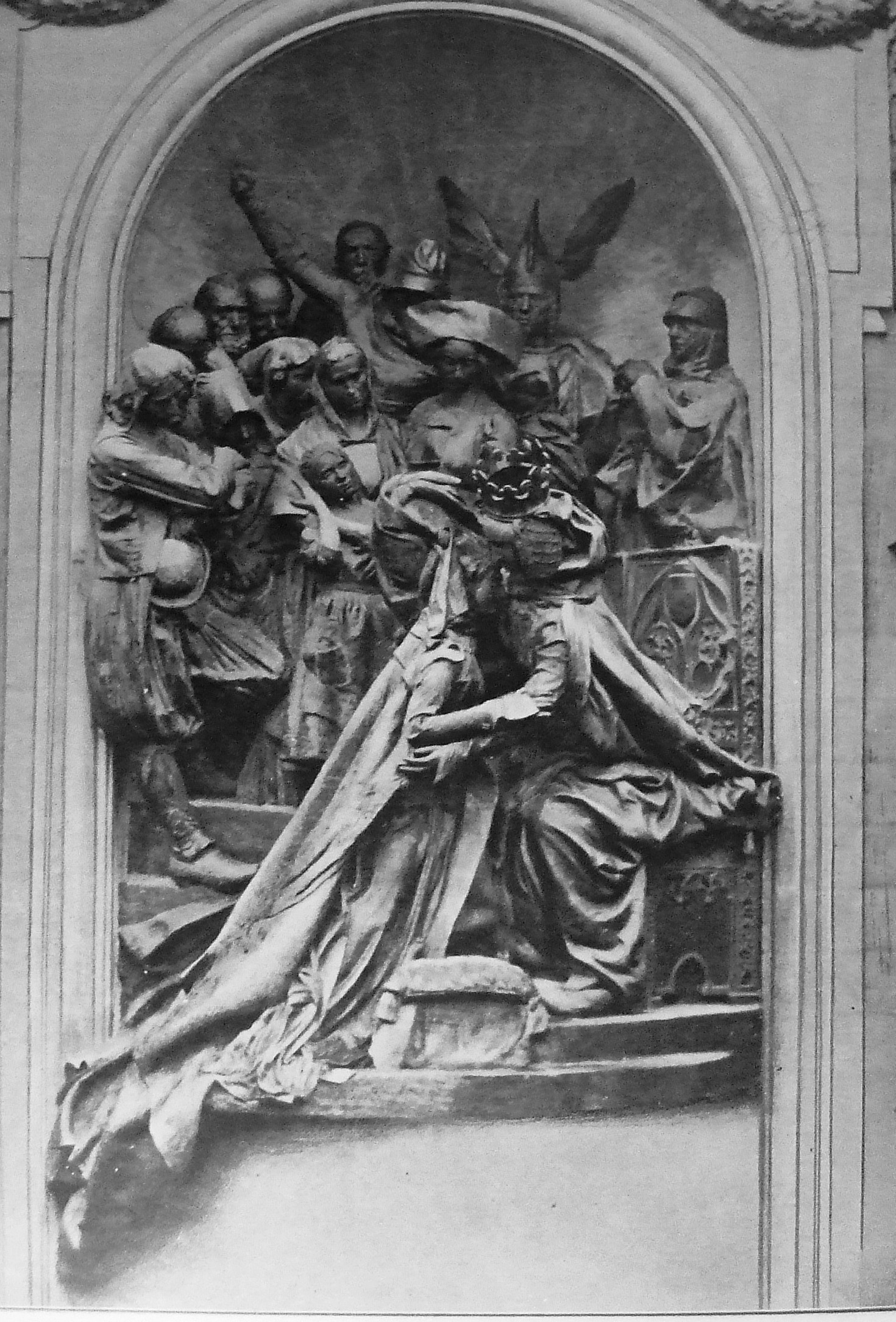
The Monument to the Union of Brittany and France in Rennes, designed by Jean Boucher in 1911. It depicts the meeting of Duchess Anne and King Charles VIII. The monument was destroyed by Breton separatists in August 7, 1932.

The union of the Duchy of Brittany with the Crown of France was the culmination of a political process begun at the end of the 15th century in the wake of the Mad War. It resulted in the Edict of Union of 13 August 1532 and the incorporation of the duchy into the Crown lands of France, a critical step in the formation of modern-day France.

As a territorial principality of the Kingdom of France, Brittany had enjoyed varying degrees of autonomy since Clovis I was given authority over the Gallo-Roman domain during the 5th century. It was first recorded as a "duchy" during the rule of Nominoe in 846, in likely recognition of Carolingian overlordship. Over the centuries, the fealty demonstrated by the Duchy of Brittany toward the French king depended significantly on the individuals holding the two titles, as well as the involvement of the English monarchy at that particular time. The reign of Francis II, Duke of Brittany, was at an especially crucial time, as the nobles struggled to maintain their autonomy against the increasing central authority desired by Louis XI. As a result of several wars, treaties, and papal decisions, Brittany was united with France through the eventual marriage of Louis XI's son Charles VIII to the heiress of Brittany, Anne in 1491. However, because of the different systems of inheritance between the two realms, the crown and the duchy were not held by the same hereditary claimant until the reign of Henry II, beginning 1547.

== Historical context ==
=== Roman times through the 13th century ===
According to Julius Caesar, Brittany (fr. Bretagne) was historically part of Celtic Gaul as Armorica (Gallic for "Place by the Sea"). On the fall of the Roman Empire, it was integrated into the Gallo-Roman domain of Syagrius. The territory was liberated from imperial control and was awarded by the emperor to Clovis I after his victory at Soissons in 486. Clovis received the titles of Honorary Consul and Patricius, thus assuring the legitimacy of his authority over the ancient Gallo-Roman domain. When Clovis died, Brittany was included in the quarter of the kingdom that was given to his son, Childebert I.

In the 9th century, with chaos spreading over Brittany, the Frankish kings, following their policy of partial delegation of power to local representatives (a precursor of the feudal system), nominated administrators of Brittany. Thus Nominoë was designated as Missus Imperatoris (emissary of the emperor) by King Louis the Pious, and then as Ducatus Ipsius Gentismissus of the Bretons, before he rebelled against royal power and obtained a degree of autonomy for Brittany.

In 942 Louis IV of France (reigned 936–954) received the homage of Alan II, Duke of Brittany. Both of them had grown up together at the court of Æthelstan, king of England, as they were in protective exile from King Raoul of France (Louis) and Viking occupation (Alan).

During the expansion of the Plantagenet, Brittany had at all times acknowledged Capetian sovereignty – even the Plantagenet rulers had rendered homage for the duchy to the kings of France – but typically of the principalities, this sovereignty was purely nominal until the early thirteenth century.

Henry II of England (ruled 1154–1189) had attempted to conquer Brittany, which was surrounded on all sides by his possessions, as he held Normandy in vassalage from the crown of France and married Eleanor of Aquitaine, thus gaining lands to the south of Brittany. While Henry's maneuvering was partially successful—he became the Count of Nantes, forced Conan IV, Duke of Brittany into abdication, and had Constance, the successor duchess, married to his son Geoffrey—the Duchy of Brittany never became incorporated into the crown of England.

The Plantagenet regime came to an end in 1203, in consequence of King John's murder of his nephew Arthur, the son of Duke Geoffrey and Constance. From that point, Brittany was indisputably subject to Capetian authority, which could now be exercised directly.

=== 14th and 15th centuries ===
France in 1477

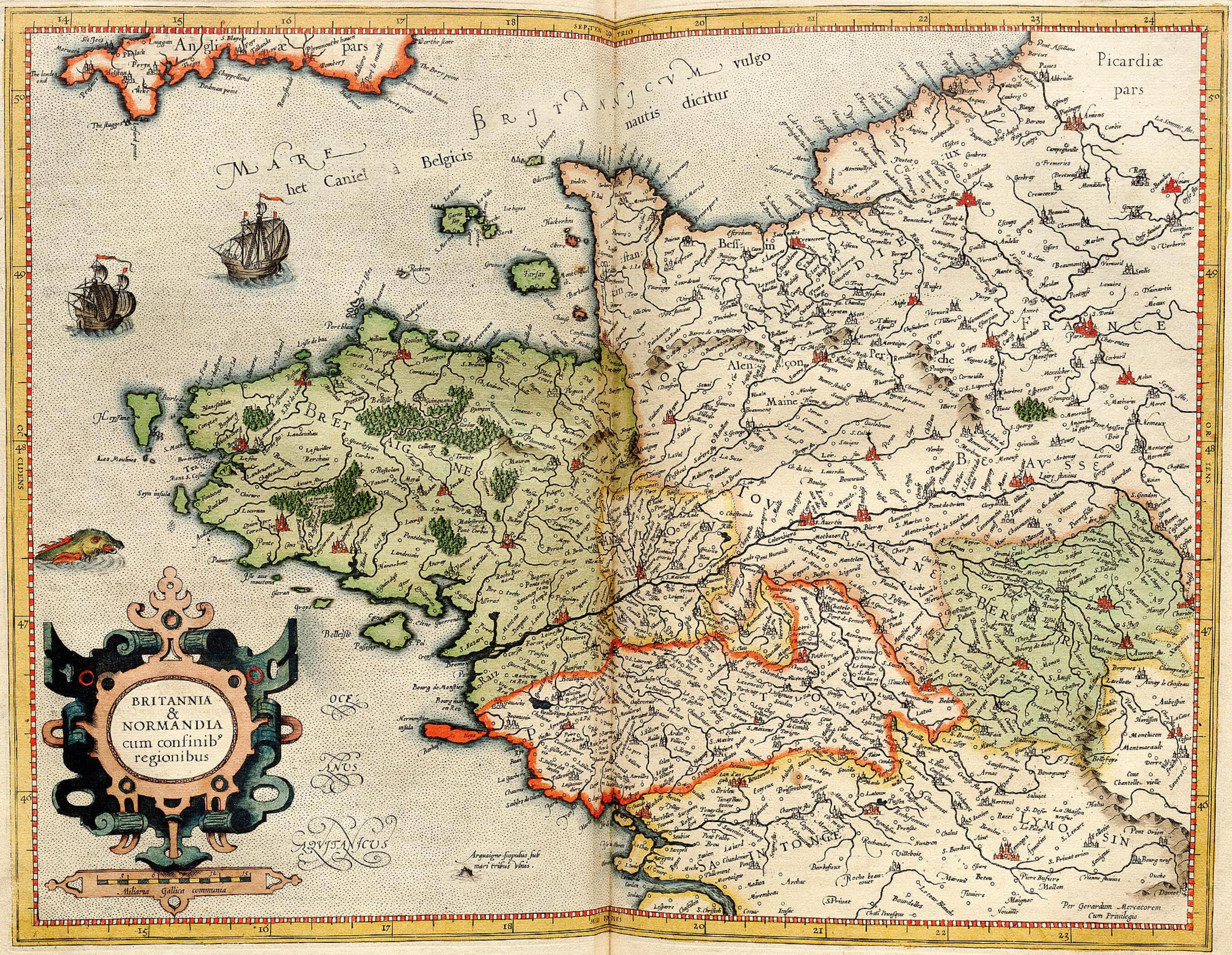
1596 map of Brittany

In the 14th century, the Breton War of Succession between the Breton House of Montfort and the House of Penthièvre could be seen as an episode of the Hundred Years' War between the House of Valois (founded by Charles of Valois, the fourth son of Philip III of France) and the House of Plantagenet (founded by Henry II of England).

In the 15th century, the more recent dukes of Brittany rendered homage to the French king, although Francis II, Duke of Brittany desired a return to greater independence. After the conclusion of the Hundred Years War, it manifested itself in direct conflicts between the king and the great princes of the kingdom. Francis II sought alliances and established diplomatic relations with England, the Holy See, and the Holy Roman Empire. The French ambassadors contested some of the duchy's moves toward independence and its assertion of historic sovereignty.

The territorial expansion of France brought it to the borders of Brittany and led to the goal of overlordship or direct control of the peninsula. From the start of the Breton War of Succession in 1341, France sought this goal and because France never willingly accepted the victory of the opposing prince, battles or wars followed one another until the final French success in 1491, 1532 or 1598, according to different views and different sources.

Louis XI felt a great hatred for Francis II of Brittany following the latter's involvement in a number of great conspiracies. Louis and his successors, the regent Anne de Beaujeu and Charles VIII, wished to:

- destroy the threat of encirclement of the French kingdom between the Duchy of Burgundy (and subsequently the Burgundian Netherlands and the County of Burgundy, which passed to the archduke of Austria) to the north and east, and Brittany to the west.
- consolidate the power of the king in the face of Francis II, who, like the other nobles, had profited from the historic enfeeblement of the monarchy to endue himself with symbols of sovereignty, such as a royal seal, a royal crown, the adoption of the principle of lèse-majesté, the establishment of a sovereign parliament (or court of justice), the establishment of a university (at Nantes), independent and direct diplomatic relations with the then major powers, and the eviction of the King's tax collectors.
- punish those nobles, including Francis II, who had fought on the anti-royalist side in multiple conflicts, such as the League of the Public Weal (1465), the conquest of Normandy in 1467–68 for Charles of France (1446–72), the war of 1471–73, the Mad War (La Guerre Folle) (1484–85), and the Franco-Breton War (1487–88).

The French Chancery justified its sovereignty over Brittany based on historical precedent:

- In 497, Clovis I united the Franks into a single kingdom.
- In the late 8th century, Charlemagne incorporated Brittany into the Carolingian Empire.
- In the 11th century, William the Conqueror expanded into Brittany.

The Breton chroniclers and the Breton Chancellery of the 14th-16th centuries defended the opposite view, arguing mainly from settlement of the territory by Bretons at an earlier date than by the Franks; but conveniently forgetting the lack of a treaty with the Roman Empire permitting the settlement in Brittany and the settlement of the Franks in the Vannes region, as well as agreements with the Frankish kings in authority following the advent of Clovis. They also argued for the sovereignty of Brittany based on its status as an ancient kingdom, although Nominoe, who had won considerable autonomy for the administration of Brittany, never had the title of king, and the fact that the homage paid by the dukes to the kings was one of alliance rather than as lieges. This last point was not recognized by the King of France.

In the second half of the 15th century, the kings of France had multiple events work to their advantage in the quest to acquire Brittany:

- England, a traditional ally of the Counts of Montfort-l'Amaury, was unable to act in force on the continent after being expelled in 1453 at the conclusion of the Hundred Years' War and while embroiled in the subsequent Wars of the Roses. Following this civil war, the newly established Tudor dynasty did send an English force under the command of Edward Woodville, Lord Scales to fight in the Battle of Saint-Aubin-du-Cormier (1488), in which they were wiped out and Lord Scales killed. Following this defeat, the Tudors did not dare intervene in Breton affairs once again.
- Brittany lost another important ally with the 1477 death of the Duke of Burgundy, Charles the Bold, whose domain was in part incorporated into the French crown and otherwise inherited by his daughter.
- The end of the dynasty of Anjou in 1482 gave the king control of the border between Anjou and Brittany.
- The Breton nobility had many interests in the kingdom and, like other nobles, those concerning pensions related to their titles. In addition, the nobles envied the influence of the Valois and of the treasurer of the Landes (an administrative division in southern France), who was a simple commoner.
- Francis II, Duke of Brittany, had irritated the nobility of Brittany when, as Prince of the Loire Valley, he had from his childhood retained strong ties with the princes of Valois at the French court (hence the unfortunate coalitions during the feudal revolts against the king).
- This lack of authority over his upper aristocracy and his government in general deprived Francis II, and later Anne of Brittany, of support. The nobility preferred to respect royal power, and only associated themselves weakly with the revolt of the great feudal lords during the Mad War (La Guerre Folle) revolt against Anne of France's regency.
- Francis II had no legitimate male heir, so his two daughters, Anne and Isabeau, were proclaimed heirs before the Estates of Brittany (the Breton council) in conformity with the Duchy's semi-Salic law of inheritance. However, there were other potential claimants: the Viscount of Rohan, the Prince of Orange, Alain d'Albret, and the King of France, who had purchased an inheritance claim from the Penthièvre family (arising from the treaty signed at the end of the Breton War of Succession).

=== Treaty of Sablé ===
Following the Battle of Saint-Aubin du Cormier, the Treaty of Sablé, or "treaty of the orchard", concluded with King Charles VIII of France on 20 August 1488, required the agreement of the French king to any marriage of the daughters of Francis II. The survival of the Breton state was thus contingent on the marriage of Anne of Brittany. Francis II wanted Anne to wed Maximilian I of Austria as a means to (hopefully) ensure the sovereignty of Brittany. Although Francis died in September 1488, his loyal supporters facilitated this union for Anne in a marriage by proxy held 19 December 1490.

Unfortunately, this violated the Treaty of Sablé as the king of France did not consent to this marriage, and it also placed the rule of Brittany in the hands of an enemy of France. As a result, France resumed its armed conflict with Brittany. The spring of 1491 brought new successes by the French general La Trémoille, and Charles VIII of France came to lay siege to Rennes. Maximilian failed to come to his bride's assistance (the Habsburgs were too busy in Hungary to pay serious attention to Brittany), and Rennes fell. Anne became engaged to Charles in the vault of the Jacobins in Rennes and traveled to Langeais to be married. Although Austria made diplomatic protests, claiming that the marriage was illegal because the bride was unwilling, that she was already legally married to Maximilian, and that Charles was legally betrothed to Margaret of Austria (Maximilian's daughter), Anne was wed to Charles VIII on 6 December 1491. The marriage was subsequently validated by Pope Innocent VIII on 15 February 1492.

== The King of France as Duke of Brittany jure uxoris ==
Charles VIII became Duke of Brittany jure uxoris upon his marriage to Anne of Brittany. During their marriage, Charles prohibited Anne from using the title of Duchess of Brittany, and imposed his own rule on the Duchy through a Royal Governor from the House of Penthièvre. However, when the king died leaving the royal couple childless, the Duchy of Brittany reverted to Anne. She returned to Brittany and re-established her independent rule. Anne's actions underscored that the Duke of Brittany's line of succession was governed by the Celtic nation's peculiar form of Semi-Salic Law rather than the strict Salic Law governing the Kingdom of France. Her actions also demonstrated that the Duke of Brittany and the King of France, at least at this time, remained distinct and separable titles.

Charles VIII's successor, Louis XII, also married Anne of Brittany, and thus the title of Duke of Brittany jure uxoris was once again in the person of the king of France. In this marriage, however, Anne was allowed to use her title, and Louis enacted all official actions in Brittany in her name. When Anne died in January 1514, her and Louis' daughter Claude inherited the Duchy of Brittany in her own right. In May 1514, the title of Duke of Brittany jure uxoris was again extant through Claude's marriage to her cousin Francis, Duke of Angoulême, heir to the throne of France. Louis XII died in January 1515, at which time Francis was crowned king of France (as Francis I), with Claude as his queen consort.

== The King of France as hereditary Duke of Brittany ==
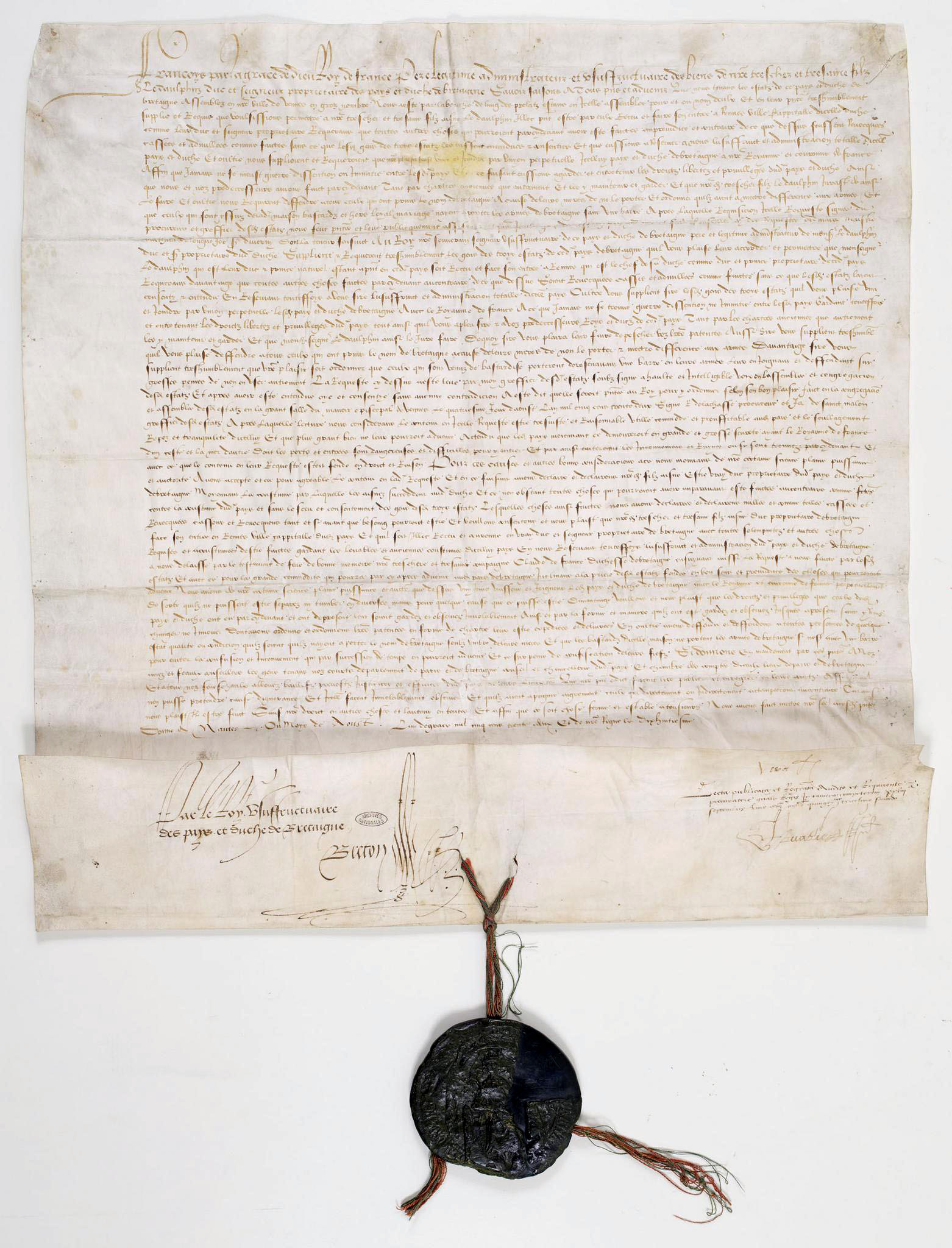
Letters patent confirming the Dauphin Francis, son of Francis I of France, as Duke of Brittany and proclaiming the perpetual union of the Duchy of Brittany with the Crown of France. Act given in Nantes in August 1532.

The Union of Brittany and France was nearly perfected through Francis III, Duke of Brittany, the eldest son of Francis I of France and Claude of France, and therefore the Dauphin of France. Francis III inherited the Duchy when he was 6 years old after the death of his mother in 1524. That Francis I allowed his eldest son to carry the title of the Duke of Brittany supports the perception that the Duchy of Brittany remained separate from the Kingdom of France. However, before the kingship and dukedom could be joined in one person, Francis III died in 1536, never to inherit the French crown. The duchy then passed to Henry, the second son of Francis I and Claude. When Francis I died in 1547, Henry succeeded him as Henry II of France, and the kingdom and dukedom were united in ruler.

Francis I also sought to enfold Brittany into the Kingdom of France through parliamentary maneuvers. Francis formally invited the Duchy of Brittany to join the French crown. On 13 August 1532, an edict of union was signed by the Estates of Brittany in Nantes. Some members of the parliament (the Estates of Brittany) were either intimidated into co-operation with the union or bought off, with the demand for union in fact being inspired by Francis I. It has been argued that the legal validity of the union is doubtful on such grounds.

Regardless of the validity of the Edict of Union of 1532, four years later in 1536, Henry became the Duke of Brittany upon the death of his brother. Thereby the Duchy of Brittany was considered incorporated into the Kingdom of France upon the death of his mother.

The crowns of Brittany and France differed principally in the application of Salic Law, and this difference remained to challenge the permanent union of the two crowns. Before this legal challenge ever surfaced, however, centuries passed, and King Louis XVI, who remained Duke of Brittany in his own right, was deposed and beheaded during the French Revolution. The Revolution eliminated royalty, nobility, and any vestiges of a governing sovereign for both the Kingdom of France and the Duchy of Brittany, and the parliament of Brittany remains suppressed to modern times.

== Political and economic factors ==
The duchy could only submit, in spite of its occasional resistance, in the face of one of Europe's strongest armies. The Breton elite were attracted by France's royal court, but the Breton merchant bourgeoisie in Saint-Malo did not identify with the interests of the Dukes of Brittany.

== See also ==
- Breton people
- Brittany
- Duchy of Brittany
- List of Breton monarchs
- List of French monarchs
- Kings of France family tree
- Territorial formation of France

== Bibliography ==
- Gabory, Émile. L'Union de la Bretagne à la France: Anne de Bretagne, duchesse et reine. Plon, 1941.
- Germain, José, and Stéphane Faye. Bretagne en France et l'union de 1532. Tallandier, 1931.
- Le Page, Dominique, and Michel Nassiet. L'union de la Bretagne à la France. Éditions Skol Vreizh, 2003.
- Leguay, Jean-Pierre. "La fin de l'indépendance bretonne." Fastes et malheurs de la Bretagne ducale 1213–1532. Ouest-France Université, 1992. pp. 434–435.
- de Mauny, Michel. 1532: le grand traité franco-breton. On account of the author, 1971.
- de Mauny, Michel. 1532–1790, les dessous de l'union de la Bretagne à la France. Éditions France-Empire, 1986. ISBN 2-7048-0510-5.
- de Mauny, Michel. Traité d'union de la Bretagne à la France. Celtics Chadenn, 2002. ISBN 2-84722-016-X.
