= Gwenn ha du (Breton paramilitary group) =

Defunct Breton paramilitary group

Gwenn ha Du (Breton for "white and black") was a paramilitary group founded at the end of 1930 in Paris by Célestin Lainé. It advocated Breton nationalism through "direct action" and published a secret manual aimed at instructing readers in terrorism. The phrase "Gwenn ha du" is the nickname for the Breton flag, which is in these colours.

== History ==
=== Statue bombing ===
In July 1932, Gwenn ha Du decided to destroy a monument it found particularly offensive: a statue created by Jean Boucher marking the union of Brittany and France in 1532. Its unveiling some twenty years earlier triggered the first protest by Breton Nationalists. Célestin Lainé made a bomb in his bedroom, consisting of a condensed milk carton filled with nitroglycerine. In the early hours of 7 August, he set the bomb behind the head of the King of France's statue in the facade opposite the mayor's office. At 4:00 a.m., the bomb detonated, shattering the bronze statue and all glass within 100 metres. On 7 August, the group claimed responsibility for the attack, which was intended to coincide with the 400th anniversary celebration of the union, taking place in Vannes under the guidance of French prime minister Édouard Herriot. L'Humanité, the French Communist Party newspaper, spoke out the day after, protesting that Herriot didn't mention that all Celtic civilisation was wiped out, the refusal to acknowledge the Breton language and culture. The authorities arrested six militants on 11 August; the six remained imprisoned for fifty days.

=== Later attacks ===
The Gwenn ha du, which presented itself as the unofficial military wing of the Parti National Breton, followed up with a few months of action. On 20 November, Gwenn ha du members detonated a bomb on the railway line between Ingrandes and Champtocé, not long before Édouard Herriot's arrival there. The train stopped in front of the damaged rails. However, Herriot eventually got to Nantes in time to celebrate the act of the Union between Brittany and France. Three more attacks followed: 13 April 1936, with arson in four préfectures; 18 December 1938, with the blowing up of a monument (the Monument de la Fédération bretonne-angevine in Pontivy); and the attack in the préfecture of Quimper on 28 February 1939.

=== Dissolution ===
A last attack was suspected on 13 May 1941 against Carhaix gendarmerie station after a statement was sent to members of the National Council in Vichy, threatening more attacks if the borders of the traditional province of Brittany were not recognised. After this the group ceased to function, its members becoming part of various milice groups working with the German occupying forces. Lainé himself led the Bezen Perrot militia, which included former Gwenn ha du activists. After the war, surviving members were either captured or fled France. Some were later associated with the Liberation Front of Brittany, which was active in the 1960s.

== Members of Gwenn ha du ==
- Célestin Lainé
- Meavenn (pseudonym)
- Guillaume Berthou
- Théophile Jeusset
