= Youenn Drezen =

Breton nationalist writer and activist (1899–1972)

Youenn Drezen (14 September 1899 – 17 February 1972) is the Breton language name of Yves Le Drézen, a Breton nationalist writer and activist. He is also known as Corentin Cariou and Tin Gariou.

== Youth ==
He was born in Pont-l'Abbé, Finistère into a poor family. His father died in 1911, leaving eight children to be raised by his young widow. Taken in by Catholic missionaries, he moved to Spain as a seminarian, living in the Basque region and then Castille. He met Jakez Riou and while conducting literary, scientific and religious studies, they explored the literary potential of the Breton language, aspiring to give it a refined form unsullied by convention.

Having abandoned his religious training, he met, while on military service in Rennes, officials of the nationalist group Unvaniezh Yaouankiz Breiz, which led to the publication of his first article in support of Breton nationalism in the journal Breiz Atao.

== Literary career ==
In 1924, he became a journalist with the Courrier du Finistère. He participated in the Quimper Pan-Celtic Congress of 1924, with François Debeauvais, Yann Sohier, Jakez Riou, Abeozen, and Marcel Guieysse, under the banner of Breiz Atao. He later worked for Gwalarn, the literary magazine founded in 1922 by Roparz Hemon and Olier Mordrel, where he established himself by publishing Breton translations from Spanish (Calderon) and ancient Greek (Aeschylus). He also published his own poetry, notably Nozvez arkus e beg an enezenn (Night Watch at the Edge of the Island), written in memory of Jakez Riou in 1938.

He also translated books for children, for example Beatrix Potter. These were published by Gwalarn, and were distributed free in schools to children who had participated in essay competitions in the Breton language.

Drezen's translations led to a full-time career as a writer. He produced a rich and varied oeuvre of poems, novels and plays, always written entirely in Breton. Some novels have been translated into French (by Pêr-Jakez Helias among others). He is considered one of the best writers in Breton, because he knew how to mix vivid expression with a quest for literary perfection, sometimes through euphony.

He joined the Breton art and literary movement Seiz Breur. His Breton epic Kan da Gornog was published with important illustrations by René-Yves Creston.

== World War II ==
During World War II, Drezen regularly published articles in the Nationalist periodical L'Heure Bretonne, an organ of the Breton National Party. He also wrote for Mordrel's Stur, Galv (edited by Henri Le Helloco) and in Yann Fouéré's La Bretagne.

In 1941, he published the first full-length novel in Breton, Itron Varia Garmez, which was about the lives of ordinary people in Pont-l'Abbé during the Great Depression (French edition, Denoël, 1943, as Notre-Dame Bigoudenn). It was also illustrated by Creston. Shortly afterwards, he freelanced for Radio Rennes Bretagne, writing radio plays and giving talks.

In 1943, he edited the bilingual newspaper Arvor. In this paper wrote many anti-American articles about the bombing of Nantes, which reflected widespread local resentment of the attacks. He was arrested in 1944, but released after a few months.

== After the war ==
After the war he remained in Nantes, where he ran a café. He continued to write for Al Liamm, the journal that succeeded Gwalarn. He also wrote an autobiographical novel Skol-Louarn Veig Trebern about his impoverished youth. He died in Lorient in 1972.
