= René-Yves Creston =

French painter (1898–1964)

René-Yves Creston (25 October 1898 – 30 May 1964), born René Pierre Joseph Creston, was a Breton artist, designer and ethnographer who founded the Breton nationalist art movement Seiz Breur. During World War II he was active in the French Resistance.

== Seiz Breur ==
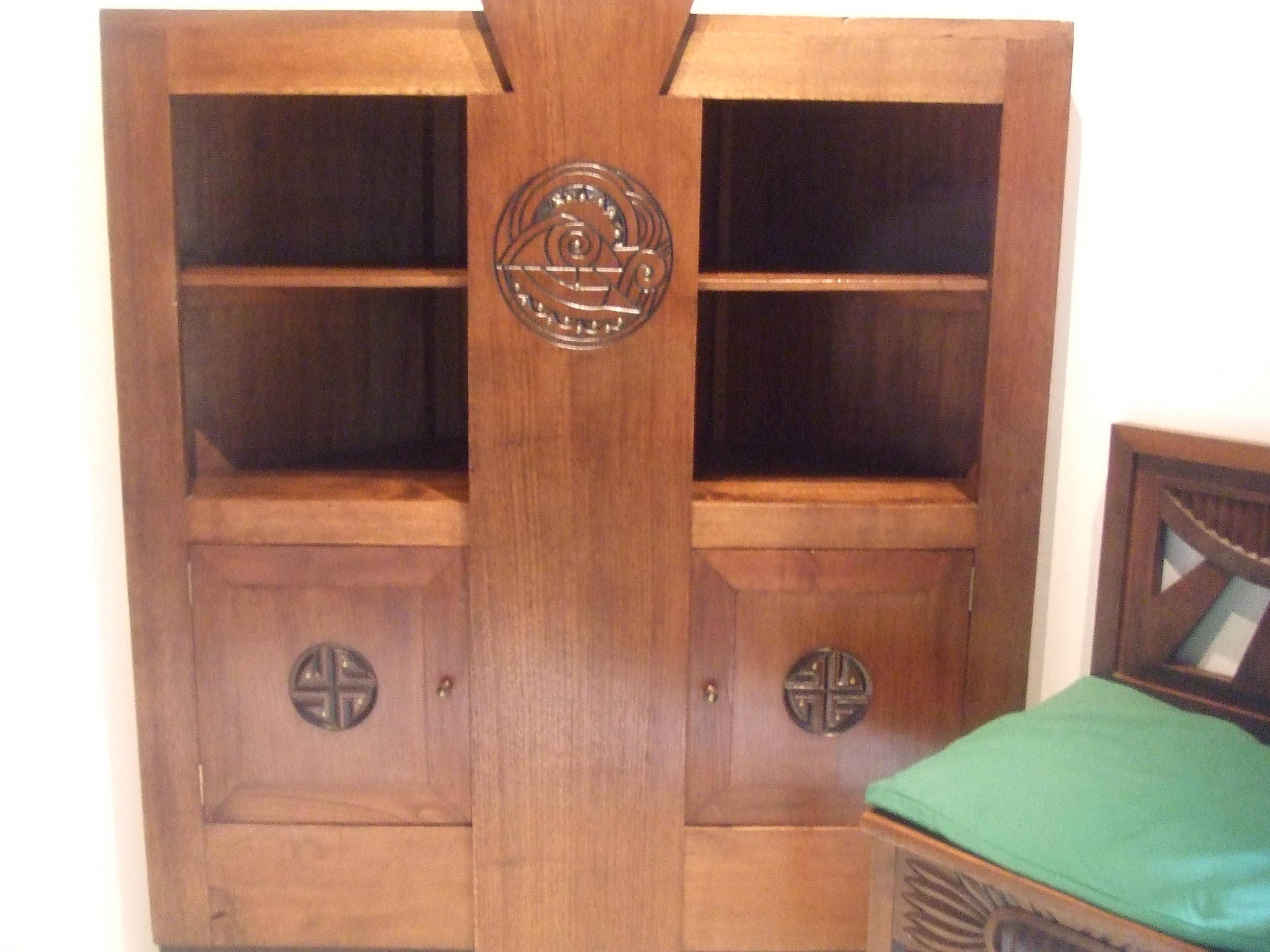
Cabinet designed by Creston as a wedding present for François Debeauvais

Born in Saint-Nazaire, Creston studied art there and at Ancenis, followed by the École des Beaux-Arts in Nantes and Paris. In 1923, he was one of the founders with Jeanne Malivel and his wife, Suzanne Creston, of Ar Seiz Breur (The Seven Brothers), which united dozens of Breton artists and designers in a movement to create a distinctive Breton avant-garde style. Creston participated in the decoration of the Pavilion of Brittany at the Exhibition of Decorative Arts in Paris in 1925. He and Malivel also collaborated on furniture designs shown there. After Malivel's early death in 1926, he became the principal coordinator of Seiz Breur until the end of 1944.

In 1927, in collaboration with the young sculptor Jules-Charles Le Bozec (1898–1973), he designed the costumes for three plays: Ar C'hornandoned, by Yann Bayon and Jean-Marie Perrot; Tog Jani by Yves Le Moal; and Lina by Roparz Hemon, the first performance of which took place in January 1927. He also assisted in the publication of the art magazines Kornog and Keltia. He worked in woodcut, watercolor, oil, and designed earthenware and sculpture. He also illustrated the book Kan da Gornog by Youenn Drezen, for which he invented a new typeface.

Creston was also associated with the wider Breton nationalist movement. He wrote articles for the Breton nationalist journal Breiz Atao, and designed images for nationalist events. In 1929 he created a cabinet as a wedding present for the Breton nationalist leader François Debeauvais. However, after Debeauvais formed the separatist Breton National Party in 1931, Creston joined the rival moderate Breton Federalist League.

== Ethnology ==
In 1929 Creston became interested in ethnological research, which he pursued while maintaining his activities as an artist. He contributed as an ethnologist to the preservation of Breton heritage, most notably by his systematic cataloguing of Breton regional costumes, which was published posthumously in 1978 as Le Costume Breton. In 1931, he participated in the decoration of the hall of the Merchant Navy at the Colonial Exhibition in Paris. In 1933, he set out for a scientific cruise with Jean-Baptiste Charcot on his ship Pourquoi-Pas?. His role was to visually document Arctic cultures. In 1936, he became an official Navy artist and joined the Musée de l'Homme in Paris, where he headed the department of the Arctic.

== Resistance activity ==
After the fall of France in 1940, Creston helped to set up one of the first resistance networks, centred at the Musée de l'Homme. According to the American historian Martin Blumenson, it had "a task of primary importance". Creston made three trips to Brittany to try to establish an effective communication network with England. He also recruited sympathizers. Most importantly, he organised a group to prepare and submit to him detailed plans of the port of St. Nazaire, especially the submarine base that the Germans had arranged for their own use, and particularly those aspects that were vulnerable to bombing. This material was passed to the British in preparation for the St. Nazaire Raid.

In February 1941, Creston was arrested as a result of a denunciation and was imprisoned for four months in Paris. On his release, he was compelled to reside in Rennes, under orders to stay away from Paris. He played no further part in the resistance.

On 5 May 1946, he received the Certificate of Service signed by Field Marshal Bernard Montgomery for his work in the service of the allies.

=== Relations with Seiz Breur ===
Creston's Resistance activity contrasted markedly with the collaborationism of other Breton nationalists, including colleagues in Seiz Breur. Fellow members Yann Goulet and Olier Mordrel were active supporters of Nazi Germany, in the belief that German victory would lead to Breton independence. Even before the fall of France Mordrel and François Debeauvais had set up a Breton government in exile in Germany in 1940. Nevertheless, during his period back in Brittany after 1941 Creston illustrated articles for their collaborationist publication L'Heure Bretonne, signed with his pseudonym "Halgan". However, in 1944 with the liberation of France, Creston resigned as director of Seiz Breur. He was replaced by Raffig Tullou.

== After the war ==
After World War II, Creston succeeded Yann Sohier as president of Ar Falz, an organization devoted to the promotion of the Breton language and of progressive and secular values in Brittany.

In 1949, he joined the Centre national de la recherche scientifique, conducted his research on Breton peasant costumes, and was sent on a mission to Naples and Sicily. At the end of career, he was responsible for reorganizing the ethnology museums in Rennes (Museum of Brittany) and Quimper (Museum Breton). He ended his career as Director of the Museum of Saint-Brieuc.

== Bibliography ==
- Martin Blumenson, Le Réseau du Musée de l'Homme, Éditions Le Seuil, Paris, 1979
- JR Rotte, Ar Seiz Breur, Éditions Breizh Hor Bro.
- René-Yves Creston , Éditions Skol Vreizh, Morlaix.
- Jean-Jacques Monnier, Résistance et conscience bretonne,1940–1945, l'hermine contre la croix gammée, Éditions Yoran Embanner, Fouesnant, octobre 2007, 400 p.
