= Louis N. Le Roux =

Breton nationalist politician (1890–1944)

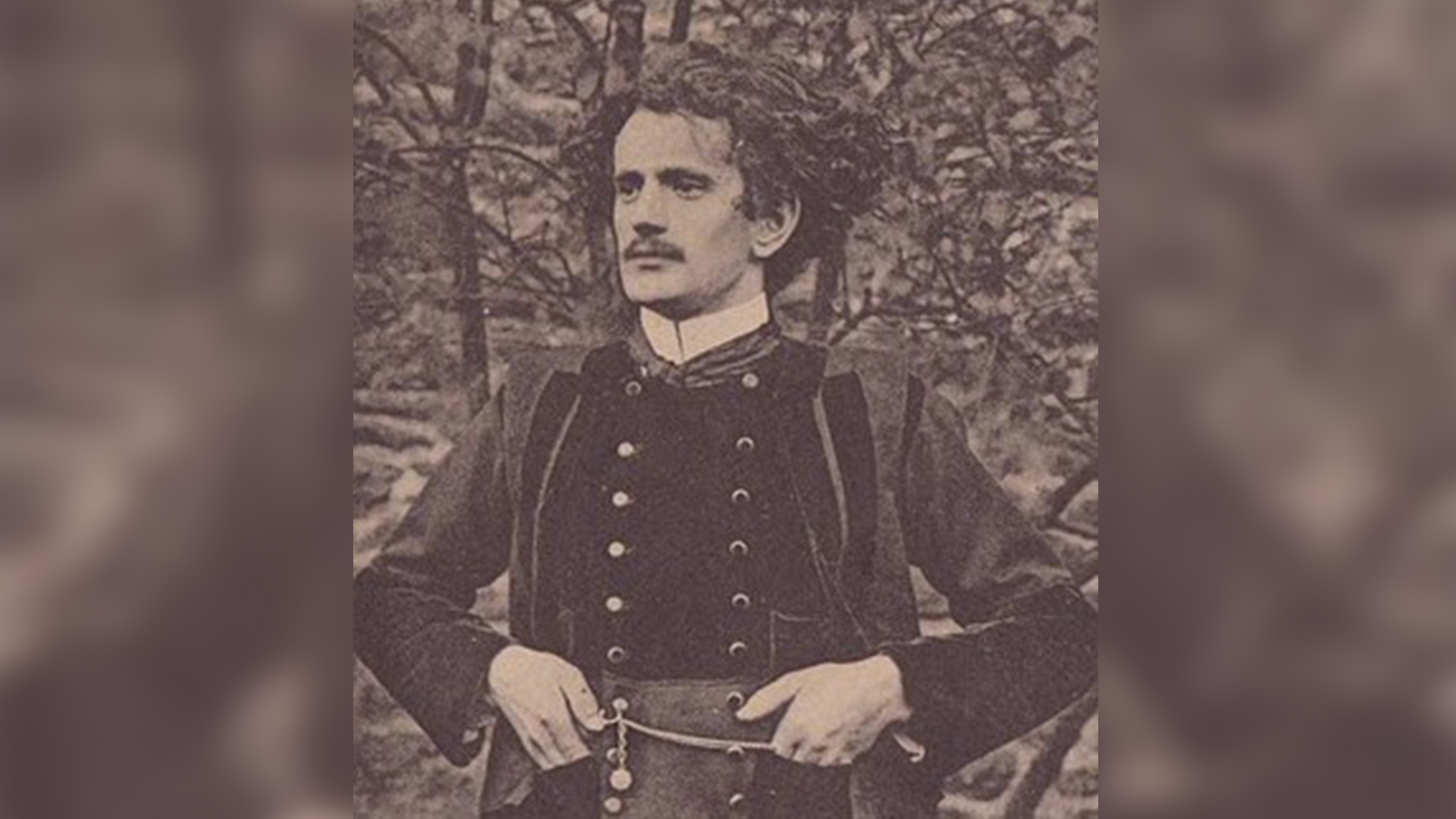
Louis Napoléon Le Roux (1911)

Louis Napoléon Le Roux (29 May 1890 – 5 August 1944) was a Breton nationalist. He is also known as Loeiz-Napoleon Ar Rouz in the Breton language.

Le Roux was born at Pleudaniel, Brittany, France, son of a miller in a family of eight children.

In 1911 he was one of the founders of the Breton Nationalist Party with Camille Le Mercier d'Erm, co-signing with him its separatist manifesto. He typically signed himself Louis N. Le Roux, perhaps in order to avoid using the name 'Louis Napoléon'. He contributed to the bulletin Brug (heather) published by Émile Masson from Pontivy, between 1913 and 1914, which promoted socialist and radical ideas to the peasantry of Lower Brittany.

Having exiled himself to Switzerland to avoid fighting for France in World War I, he left for Ireland, having been accepted by the United Kingdom as a political refugee in 1916 after France attempted to extradite him; there he established good relations with nationalist leaders although during the same war, he served in the British Army, stationed within Ireland, from June 1916 until he was invalided due to ill-health in September 1917.

Le Roux contributed to the journal La Bretagne libertaire in 1921. In 1922, he translated into French the works of Ramsay MacDonald. He also wrote one of the earliest biographies of Patrick Pearse. He also contributed actively to another journal, Breizh Atao but left to avoid responsibility for its debts in the 1930s and started a new Breton Nationalist Association (French: Associatione nationale bretonne (ANB)), with a new journal, Breizh Dishual which he became editor of. At that stage he proclaimed he had rejected armed militancy and advocated compulsory teaching of the Breton language in schools in Lower Brittany and the teaching of Breton history throughout the province.

Eventually, and perhaps surprisingly, he became private secretary to the British Conservative politician Harold Macmillan, before being killed during the London Blitz of World War II in August 1944 aged 54, when a German V-2 rocket hit the Middlesex Hospital, where he was being treated for influenza.

== Publications ==
- Pour le séparatisme la question bretonne essai précédé du manifeste (Rennes: Editions du Parti Nationaliste Breton, 1911)
- La Langue des Relations Interceltiques
- L'Irlande militante: la vie de Patrick Pearse, avec une introduction historique et 15 photographies (Rennes: Imprimerie Commerciale de Bretagne, 1932)
