= Abeozen =

Breton nationalist and writer (1896–1963)

Abeozen (François Eliès)
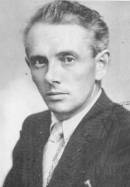
- Born: Fañch Eliès; 1896; Saint-Sauveur, Finistère
- Died: 1963 (aged 66–67); La Baule
- Occupations: Novelist, poet and Breton nationalist
- Writing career
- Pen name: Abeozen

François Eliès, born Fañch Eliès and better known by the pseudonym Abeozen, (1896 Saint-Sauveur, Finistère – 1963 La Baule) was a Breton nationalist, novelist and dramatist who wrote in the Breton language. Abeozen was also a noted scholar of the Welsh language.

Abeozen started contributing to the Breton literary journal Gwalarn in 1925. He worked as a teacher in Saint-Brieuc from 1927 to 1940 and founded the local branch of the communist Secours Rouge organization. During the German occupation of France, he joined Roparz Hemon at the newly founded Radio Rennes Bretagne and wrote for La Bretagne, L'Heure Bretonne and Arvor. He was also a member of Seiz Breur and the Institut celtique de Bretagne.

As France was liberated Abeozen, like many Breton nationalists, was arrested for collaborating with the German occupants and spent fourteen months in prison. (See also Breton nationalism and World War II for the political background.) He was further fired from the Éducation nationale and forbidden to stay in administrative Brittany.

He was considered one of the best orators and writers in the Breton language of his time. His work on the Breton language history was essential for further studies.

== Bibliography ==
Partial bibliography

- Breton translation of Mabinogion.
- Lennaduriou kembraek (XVIIvet - XIXvet kantved). Dibabet ha troet gant Abeozen; Brest, Gwalarn, n° 108, Du 1937, pp 3–43.
- Geriadurig brezonek krenn. Rennes. 1941. Sterenn
- Yezadur berr ar c'hembraeg. Skridoù Breizh - Brest. 1942.
- Dremm an Ankou (translation: The face of death). Skridoù Breizh - Brest : La Baule. 1942.
- Hervelina Geraouell. Éditions de Bretagne : Skridou Breiz - Brest. 1943, Hor yezh - Lesneven 1988
- Marvailhou loened. Éditions de Bretagne : Skridou Breiz - Brest. 1943
- Skol vihan ar c'hembraeg. Skridou Breizh - Brest. 1944. (avec Kerverziou)
- Bisousig kazh an tevenn. Al Liamm. 1954, An Here - Quimper, 1987.
- Istor lennegezh vrezhonek an amzer-vremañ, Al Liamm, 1957. Histoire de la littérature bretonne.
- Damskeud eus hol lennegezh kozh. Al Liamm. 1962.
- Yezhadur nevez ar C'hembraeg. Hor Yezh - Brest. 1964. (avec Goulven Pennaod)
- Pirc'hirin kala-goanv. Brest, Al Liamm, 1969, Al Liamm - Brest. 1986.
- Pevar skourr ar Mabinogi troidigezh diwar skrid al levr gwenn, kentskrid ha notennou gant F. Elies Abeozen. Quimper, Preder, 1980.
- Breiz a gan. Chorale Saint-Matthieu - Morlaix. 1980.
- Pevar skourr ar mabinogi. Preder - Plomelin. 1980.
- Kan ar spered hag ar Galon. Mouludarioù Hor Yezh - Lesneven. 1983. photogr. de Daniele Jego
- Barzhaz 1837-1939. Hor yezh - Lesneven. 1987
- Argantael. Al Liamm - Brest. 1989. préf. de Gwendal Denez

== Notes ==
- The above article was created as a translation of its counterpart on the French Wikipedia. (Specifically this version)
