= Job Jaffré =

French journalist

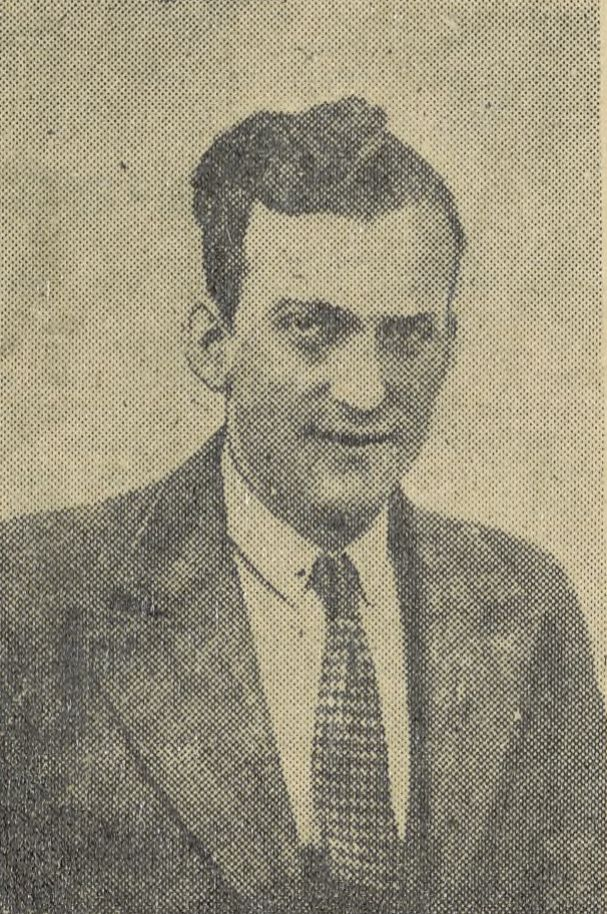
Job Jaffré

Joseph-Marie Jaffré, better known as Job Jaffré (May 6, 1906 - March 12, 1986), was a French journalist and Breton nationalist. He also published under pseudonyms, most notably as Jos Pempoull.

Jaffré was born in Berné, Morbihan. His journalistic work was strongly associated with the promotion of Breton culture and language. He worked on Breton onomastics and toponymy. He also became active in the Breton separatist movement.

Working for the journal Nouvelliste de Lorient he created the "Celtic Circle of Lorient" and became active in the Breton National Party. He also worked voluntarily for Loeiz Herrieu's Breton language literary magazine Dihunamb.

== World War II ==
During the German occupation, he became associated with collaborationism. After December 1940 he became one of the hosts of Radio Rennes Bretagne. In May 1941 he joined L'Heure Bretonne, the journal of the Breton National Party. He later became its editor in chief. Hervé Le Boterf in his book La Bretagne dans la guerre asserts that Jaffré made L'Heure Bretonne into something of a sensationalist publication, "under his leadership, the party's weekly adopted a popular novelistic style." To bring about a new increased circulation for the newspaper, he emphasised gossip, lurid headlines and scandal stories.

Under Jaffré, the journal also published a number of articles supporting antisemitic acts under German occupation. Following the mass arrest of Jews in Paris known as the Vel' d'Hiv Roundup on 16 and 17 July 1942, L'Heure Bretonne published a front-page article entitled À la porte les juifs et les enjuivés ("Show the Door to the Jews and the Judaized") under the signature "DR".

In the same vein, Jaffré, under his pseudonym "Tug", published a denunciation of the bombings committed by the forces of "youtre-Atlantique", a wordplay on "outre-Atlantique" ("over the Atlantic") and "youtre", a derogatory term for "Jew". Later in the same year, he wrote that he expected a "reversal of alliance... when the Jewish problem has been eliminated".

== Postwar career ==
At the Liberation, he was jailed for 14 months, but he was released in December 1945 without any conviction. In 1955 he became a writer for La Liberté du Morbihan, which had replaced the defunct Nouvelliste de Lorient. He was responsible for overseeing the news section "Pays d' Auray". One of his most popular contributions was the bilingual weekly column signed "Madedad" ("father'sson") . He also contributed to the journal Breizh ("Brittany"), published by Kendalc'h. Jaffré died in Auray.

== Publications ==
- Yann Ar Baluc'henn. Arrangé par Daniel Doujet. Dastum, 1986.
- Le Breizh hor bro (avec la coll.de Charles Le Gall). 1955. Rédité en 2005, Toutes les Cultures de Bretagne, Ed. Skol Vreizh.
- Seigneurs et Seigneuries du Kemenet-Heboé, Dalc'homp Soñj, 1986.
- Secrets et Mystères de nos Kêr, édition Dalc'homp Soñj / Lorient.
- Etrezomp e brezhoneg, 1980–1981, édité par Emglev Bro an Orient, 2008. Recueil d'articles hebdomadaires du journal La Liberté du Morbihan.
