= Breton nationalism and World War II =

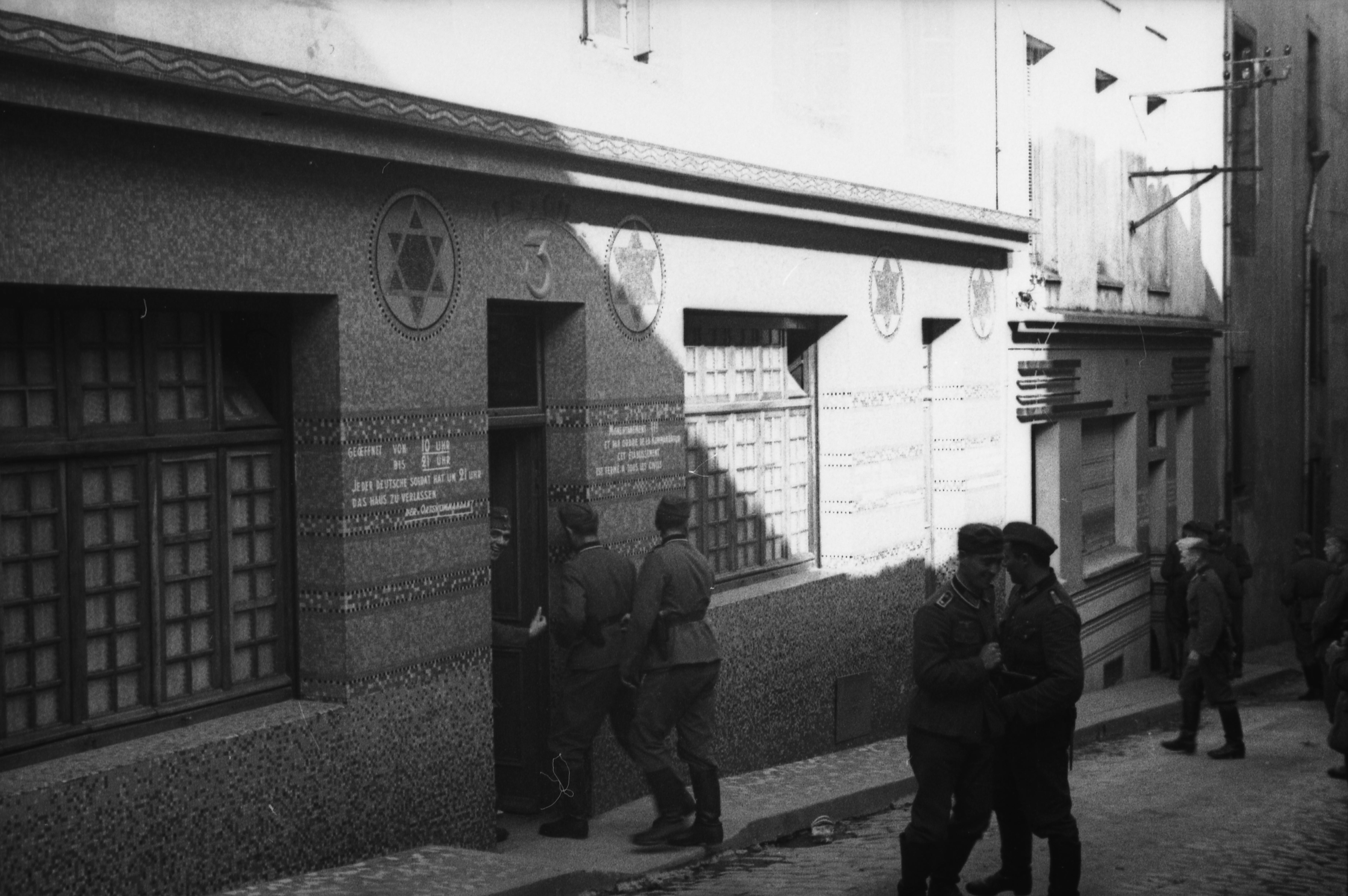
German soldiers outside a synagogue turned into a military brothel in occupied Brittany, 1940.

Long before World War II, the various Breton nationalist organizations were often anti-French and anti-colonialist, opposed to the Central Government's policy of linguistic imperialism, and critical to varying degrees of post-French Revolution-style Republicanism. Some Breton nationalists were openly pro-fascist. The extent to which this led Breton nationalists into collaboration with the Axis Powers and their motivations, remains a matter of often bitter historical controversy and debate.

== Background ==
Before the occupation, Breton nationalists were divided between adherents of regionalism, federalism, and political independence. Essentially these factions, though divided, remained openly hostile to the Third French Republic's policies of centralized government, anti-Catholicism, the coercive Francization policy in the State educational system, and the continued ban against Breton-medium education. Among these groups, only the openly separatist Breton National Party remained organized; dissolved in 1939, it was rapidly reconstituted in the autumn of 1940 and became the most active political party in Brittany under the Occupation. Having broken in 1931 from regionalism, its founders (Olier Mordrel and François Debeauvais) were inspired by the success of the Irish War of Independence and played the secessionist card. When the war broke out, the Breton National Party chose a position of strict neutrality. This party's ideas were anti-republican and complacent towards xenophobia and antisemitism, influenced by German racism and close to all the varieties of European fascism. During the war the ideology of the Breton National Party was favored by the forces of occupation and other branches of the Breton movement accordingly found themselves marginalized.

== Collaboration with the Vichy regime ==
On 15 December 1940 a "petition" signed by 46 Bretons requesting "administrative autonomy" in the confines of a united France was sent to Philippe Pétain. On 22 January 1941, the Vichy government named Hervé Budes de Guébriant President of the National Commission for Agricultural Cooperation. The daily journal La Bretagne was created by Yann Fouéré on 21 March 1941. Like other adherents of the deposed French Monarchy, La Bretagne favored the restoration of Brittany's pre-1789 regional autonomy and opposed the secessionist policies of the Breton National Party. An appreciable number of Breton nationalists were also found in the Consultative Committee of Brittany, created on 11 October 1942 by Jean Quénette, prefect of the region of Brittany. "An organization of study and work", according to Yvonnig Gicquel, it did not wield any executive or decisive powers (against the wishes of the provincial parliament which conceived the adoption of a Breton cultural and regional autonomy doctrine). The will of its members (including members of the Breton National Party Yann Fouéré, Joseph Martray, etc.) was to transform this consultative committee into a true legislative assembly to tackle regional problems. Many of its members were to resurface when CELIB was created.

== Collaboration with Germany ==
=== German politics ===
The work of Henri Fréville and Kristian Hamon have opened up this field for research. Three different periods can be considered.

Before 1939, Germany was trying to stop France and the United Kingdom from entering the war. During the phony war, Germany planned to favor regionalist movements (particularly those of Flanders and Brittany) in order to undermine France. This was in revenge for the Treaty of Versailles, and to ensure that Germany remained the only Continental power, with no threats on its western border. Some weapons were delivered but never used. By the end of June and early July, some Breton nationalists could take it for granted the independence of Brittany was well on the way when the Germans appointed a military governor in Brittany ruling over the five départements of ancient Brittany.

However, after the defeat of France a settlement was quickly made with the occupying power. The projects to undermine France were abandoned and the support for the nationalists disappeared (in particular it was formally forbidden to proclaim a Breton state or to harm public order). Moreover, the formal annexation of Alsace-Lorraine was never proclaimed. After the Conference of Montoire nationalist movements were simply tolerated (transport permits were given as well as authorizations for purchases of gasoline that soon meant little in practice), and German support went no further than preventing the Vichy regime from suppressing the nationalist movements.

==== Ideology ====
Bretons were not considered untermenschen (subhuman) by the Nazis, unlike the Jews and Romani for example. Mordrel, Lainé and some other Celticists argued that the Bretons were a 'pure' strain of the Celtic race, who had retained their "Nordic" qualities, a view consistent with Nazi Aryan master race ideology. Other Nationalists, such as Perrot, adopted a more conservative-Catholic stance consistent with longstanding Breton anti-radical ideologies that had emerged among the Royalist-Catholic "Whites" during the French Revolution.

==== Strategic rationale ====
A main intention of the German occupiers was to break French national unity. Its support for Breton nationalism needs to be seen in this wider context which included other aspects, for example the division of France into the occupied zone and the Vichy zone. However Breton nationalists very soon realized that Germany was in practice trying to keep its friends in the Vichy government content and therefore refusing to give any priority at all to the Breton nationalist demands.

Nazi scholar Rudolf Schlichting toured the region and sent the following comment to his superiors: "from a racial point of view there would be no objection to a Germanization of the Breton population. It is evident that we have no interest in promoting the Breton national consciousness, once the separation [with France] is accomplished. Not a penny should be spent on the promotion of the Breton language. The French language will however be replaced by German. In one generation Brittany will be a predominately (sic) German country. This goal is definitely attainable through the schools, the authorities, the army and the press."

=== Breton National Party ===
Important members of the Breton National Party including Morvan Lebesque and Alan Heusaff began collaborating with the Germans to one degree or another. The example of Ireland, or even the ideal of an independent Brittany - continued to be their reference points. Recent studies have shown the close links that Breton separatist leaders such as Célestin Lainé and Alan Louarn had with German military intelligence (the Abwehr), going back well before the war, to the Weimar Republic of the 1920s. After the defeat of 1940, the Germans used these separatist agents in military operations or in repression against the French Resistance. A short-lived breakaway faction of the Breton National Party, created in 1941, was the Mouvement Ouvrier Social-National Breton (Breton National-Socialist Workers Movement) led by Théophile Jeusset.

==== Brezona ====
At the end of 1940, Job Loyant — along with Kalondan, André Lajat, and Yves Favreul-Ronarc'h, a former leader of the Breton National Party in Loire-Atlantique — developed the doctrine of the Brezona movement: supremacy of the Breton race, formation of a national community, and government by the elite. This movement was to have but a brief existence. To prevent a possible takeover of the BNP by this splinter group, Yann Goulet appeared at Nantes to pronounce the excommunication of the Brezona as "deviationists." With his revolver in plain sight on the hip of the black uniform he wore as chief of the Youth Organizations, he left no doubt as to his intentions. The Nantes PNB meeting, at which the Brezona movement had hoped to take control, took place without incident.

==== Bezen Perrot ====
A number of Breton nationalists choose to join the Bezen Perrot organization, a German militia led by Célestin Lainé and Alan Heusaff. As many as 70 to 80 people joined its ranks at one point or another, with typically 30 to 66 at any one time depending on recruiting and defection. During the war a handful of Breton militants decided to ask for German support in the face of the assassination of several leading figures of the Breton cultural movement, such as l'Abbé Jean-Marie Perrot. Having originally been named Bezen Kadoudal, the 1943 assassination of the priest prompted Lainé to give his name to the organization in December of that year.

It had already been envisaged by German strategists that in the event of Allied invasion the Breton nationalists would form a rearguard, and that further nationalist troops could be parachuted into Brittany. In late 1943 sabotage dumps had been hidden for use by the militia.

==== Strolladoù Stourm ====
The Strolladoù Stourm (also known as Bagadoù stourm), led by Yann Goulet and Alan Louarn, was the armed wing of the Breton National Party. A handful of their members took part in a confrontation with the population of Landivisiau, on August 7, 1943. Yann Goulet, their leader, forbade participation in Bezen Perrot.

==== Landerneau Kommando ====
By April 1943, the Gestapo had created specific units to combat the French Resistance. Formed at the end of April 1944 in Landerneau, the Landerneau Kommando took part in these units. It was composed of 18 German soldiers and ten French agents (some of whom were Breton separatists as well as former Resistance members). They fought against the maquis (rural French Resistance units) of Trégarantec, Rosnoën, and Ploumordien. Several Resistance members were tortured, and the Kommando also summarily executed some prisoners.

== Actions by the Resistance ==
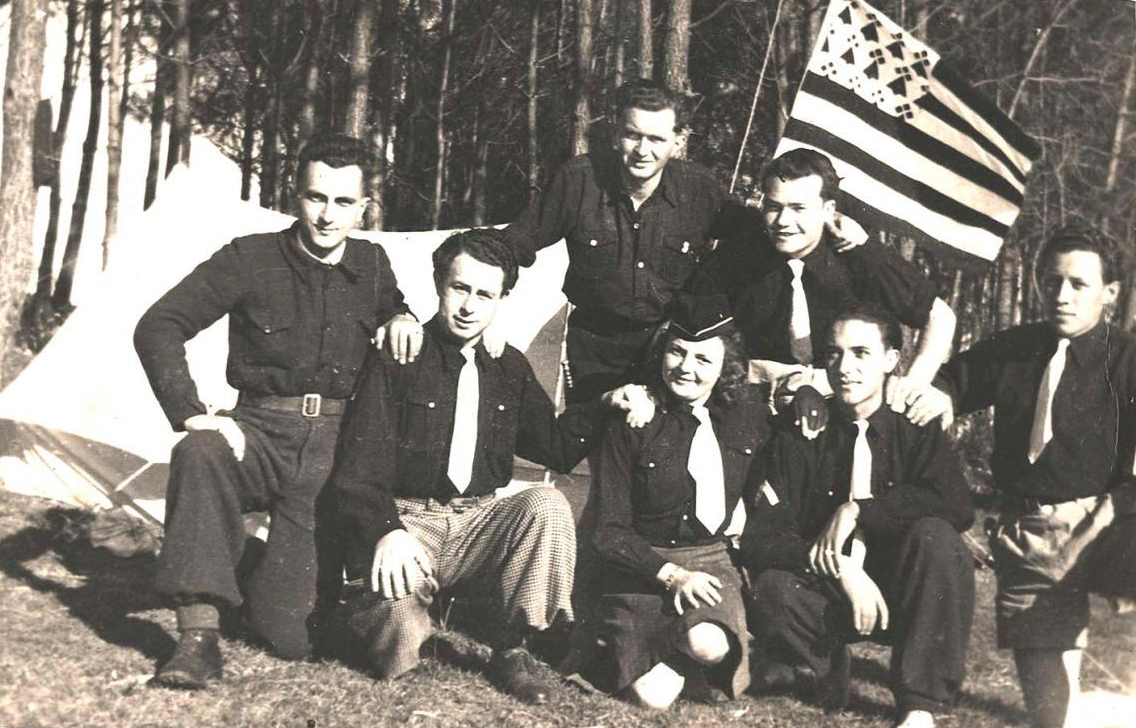
Breton resistors near Saint-Nazaire with the flag of Brittany, probably photographed after the Liberation

Several Breton nationalists were assassinated by the Resistance in 1943. The best known was Abbé Perrot, killed on 12 December 1943 by Jean Thépaut, a member of the Communist Resistance. Earlier, on the 3 September, Yann Bricler had been shot in his office by three FTP members, and similarly Yves Kerhoas was killed by the Resistance when leaving a fete in the village of Plouvenez. When American troops arrived in 1944, communist maquis members began their repressive actions. Jeanne Coroller-Danio, the Breton historian who worked under the name Danio, was beaten to death along with her brother-in-law, Commander Le Minthier.

The BNP, dissolved along with the French Communist Party in 1939, no longer legally existed. Its activists were hunted down and not distinguished from the Breton militants who wore the symbol of the dukes of Brittany ("ermine-trimmed berets"). Many were deported to detention camps; notably at the Camp Marguerite in Rennes where 150 nationalists were detained for alleged collaborationism. The Breton nationalists sought to defend the fact that their widespread image as an overtly fascist, even Nazi, movement had nothing to do with the actual political backgrounds of their activists, as varied as the Action Française (royalist), the French Section of the Workers' International (SFIO, socialist), the separatist Breton National Party (PAB), or the French Communist Party.

== Involvement in the Resistance ==
Several leading Breton activists – regionalists, federalists and separatists – joined the Resistance against the occupation. They had various motivations:

=== Sao Breiz ===
As early as 1940 some joined Sao Breiz, the Breton wing of the Free French. This included several members of the Union Régionaliste Bretonne (Breton Regionalist Union) and the Ar brezoneg er skol association, founded before the war by Yann Fouéré. M. de Cadenet, a member of the latter group, and some of his associates wrote a draft statute, presented to General Charles de Gaulle which would have given Brittany a number of political freedoms after the return of peace. According to Yann Fouéré, this plan was close in spirit to the one that the Breton Consultative Committee wanted to submit in 1943 to Marshal Pétain. Neither of these two plans resulted in anything.

=== Joining underground organisations ===
Activists like Francis Gourvil, Youenn Souffes-Després and Jean Le Maho had before the war been members of minority separatist or federalist movements such as the Parti Autonomiste Breton (PAB) or the Ligue fédéraliste de Bretagne. These organisations were always clearly anti-fascist and critical of the extreme right. This led their members directly into the underground Resistance. Others joined the Resistance as individuals and after the war restarted their involvement in Breton nationalism. Members of the Bagadou Stourm founded the Forces Bretonnes de l'Intérieur (Breton Forces of the Interior, a Breton wing of de Gaulle's French Forces of the Interior), and were deported to Buchenwald.

=== Liberty Group ===
For other groups, such as the Liberty Group of Saint-Nazaire (composed of young defectors from the Bagadoù Stourm), pro-British feeling was the determining factor in pushing them to ally themselves with the French Resistance. The Liberty Group, under the name of Bataillon de la Poche ("Pocket Battalion"), helped to liberate Saint-Nazaire from a pocket of German holdouts in May 1945.

=== Breton nationalists linked to the London-based leadership of the Resistance ===
- The painter René-Yves Creston, despite his involvement with L'Heure Bretonne (a Breton nationalist and antisemitic newspaper), was affiliated with the Resistance network of the Musée de l'Homme. He was engaged in reconnaissance work for the British. It seems that in October 1940, he received via Yann Fouéré a memo destined for London concerning Breton autonomy (to be continued by the Comité Consultatif de Bretagne), with a short preface specifying the origins of the "Breton question."
- In 1940, the overtly pro-Nazi Olier Mordrel covertly sent Hervé Le Helloco on a mission to England (via the channels of the Resistance) in order to convince the leadership of the Resistance of the "Allied leanings" of the Breton movement. This effort went no further because of Helloco's track record, and the reaction of the Nazi-allied PNB.

== The nationalist movement after the liberation of France ==
After France was liberated, it was as collaborators, not as separatists, that the PNB members were punished, and even then it was by no means all those members that were affected. Only 15 to 16 per cent of PNB members appeared in court, and few non-member sympathisers were prosecuted. Most leading members escaped in Ireland or Germany and were not judged. There was no mass repression as claimed in post-war separatist propaganda. However the post-war nationalist movements will tend to minimise the collaboration with Nazi Germany and will create the myth of the separatists' repression by the French government.

Despite the involvement of Breton nationalists with the French Resistance, an effort was made, however, by the post-war Government of the Fourth French Republic to discredit all Breton language, cultural, and political activism by depicting it is synonymous with Nazism, treason, and collaboration.

Still today, some people are worried by the "collective amnesia" of the current Breton autonomist movement about World War II or by their attempts to rehabilitate the nationalist collaborationists.

On the other hand, it is the standpoint of at least some modern Breton activists is that the collaboration of some Breton nationalists with the Axis Powers during World War II is being both exaggerated and exploited for propaganda by the French government and media to discredit the current aims of the Breton movement, such as language revival, political devolution, and the expansion of Breton-medium education.

== See also ==
- Project Burgund

== Bibliography ==
- In chronological order, earliest first

=== English language ===
- Reece, Jack E. (1977) The Bretons against France: ethnic minority nationalism in twentieth-century Brittany. Chapel Hill: University of North Carolina Press
- Biddiscombe, Perry (2001) "The Last White Terror: the Maquis Blanc and its impact in liberated France, 1944-1945", in: The Journal of Modern History, 2001
- Leach, Daniel (2008) "Bezen Perrot: the Breton nationalist unit of the SS, 1943-5"
- Leach, Daniel (2009) Fugitive Ireland: European minority nationalists and Irish political asylum, 1937-2008. Dublin: Four Courts Press

=== French language ===
- Le mouvement breton. Automatisme et fédéralisme. Carhaix, Éd. 'Armoricai, sans date (1937). by René Barbin
- La Bretagne écartelée. Essai pour servir à l'histoire de dix ans. 1938-1948 -. Nouvelles éditions latines. 1962. by Yann Fouéré.
- Complots pour une République bretonne -. La Table Ronde. 1967. by Ronan Caerleon
- La Bretagne contre Paris -. La Table Ronde. 1969 de Jean Bothorel
- La Bretagne dans la guerre. 2 volumes. France-Empire. 1969. by Hervé Le Boterf
- Racisme et Culte de la race.- La Bretagne réelle. Celtia. (Rennes). Été 1970. Supplément à La Bretagne réelle N°300. par P.-M. de Beauvy de Kergalec.
- Breiz Atao -. Alain Moreau. 1973. Olier Mordrel.
- Le rêve fou des soldats de Breiz Atao. Nature et Bretagne. 1975. by Ronan Caerleon
- Histoire résumée du mouvement breton-. Nature et Bretagne. 1977. by Yann Fouéré.
- Nous ne savions que le breton et il fallait parler français -. Mémoire d'un paysan du Léon. Breizh hor bro. 1978. by Fanch Elegoët.
- La Bretagne, Problèmes du régionalisme en France, Cornelsen-Velhagen & Klasing, Berlin 1979.
- La Bretagne sous le gouvernement de Vichy -. Edition France-Empire. 1982. by Hervé Le Boterf.
- Histoire du mouvement breton, Syros, 1982. by Michel Nicolas.
- Archives secrètes de Bretagne, 1940-1944, Rennes, Ouest-France, 1985. d'Henri Fréville
- Breizh/Europa. Histoire d'une aspiration -. Edition Ijin. 1994. Annaig Le Gars.
- Les nationalistes bretons sous l'Occupation, Le Relecq-Kerhuon, An Here, 2001. by Christian Hamon.
- L'hermine et la croix gammée. Le mouvement breton et la collaboration, Ed. Mango, 2001. by Georges Cadiou.
- Les usages politiques de la Seconde Guerre mondiale en Bretagne : histoire, mémoire et identité régionale. Marc Bergère.
- Archives secrètes de Bretagne 1940-1944 par Henri Fréville, éditions Ouest France, 2004
- De 1940 à 1941, réapparition d'une Bretagne provisoirement incomplète, un provisoire destiné à durer, bulletin et mémoires de la Société archéologique et historique d'Ille-et-Vilaine, tome CXIV. 2010. by Etienne Maignen.
