= Breton National Committee =

The Breton National Committee (Comité national breton, or CNB) was a Breton nationalist body founded on July 3, 1940 at the so-called "Congress of Pontivy", headed by François Debeauvais and Olier Mordrel. It was designed to promote Breton independence from France by collaboration with the occupying German forces. They drew up a proclamation of eighteen points, known as "Pontivy Programme". They also created a new journal, l'Heure Bretonne. 201 issues appeared between July 1940 and June 1944. Its first editor was Morvan Lebesque until December 1940, then Jean Merrien.

== Background ==
The choice of Pontivy was not arbitrary, because it was in this town that the last congress of the Breton National Party would have been held in 1939 had it not been prohibited by the French police.

Very few activists (approximately 200 including 80 released prisoners) took part in the meeting. Many militants were still held in prison camps, others, such as the painter Paul Durivaut had died in battle. A few days earlier, Mordrel and Debeauvais, joined by Marcel Guieysse and Célestin Lainé, had met to form the CNB, of which Debeauvais was unanimously elected president. The post of vice-president was given to Olier Mordrel, but this post was later cancelled in a majority vote, following Célestin Lainé's proposal that it was unnecessary. These internal intrigues were explained four months later when the changes in the organization of the party led to the ousting of Mordrel.

== Speech ==
Debeauvais, Guieysse and Lainé spoke in turn after Marcel Planiol, the lawyer of the Breton National Party, had pointed out the claims to fame of each one. Mordrel proclaimed the "declaration of Pontivy", which specified that:

The Breton National Council, a body representative of Brittany, concerned with the collective good and of the honour of their people, will act at the hour chosen by it to create a Breton nation state, within its natural boundaries and the spirit of its traditions, so that it could live finally in organized nationality, free of its aspirations and mistress of its own interests ... the international statute of the Breton State, the nature of its relations with France and Germany would be defined by agreements, freely discussed within the framework of the possibilities offered by the new general conditions.

== Aftermath ==
The militants dispersed at the end of the afternoon. Opponents heckled groups of the nationalists, and disrupted the proceedings by singing the Marseillaise from a distance. Célestin Lainé officially took possession of the Château des Rohan, which he transformed into barracks to lodge the first members of his future Breton Legion (forty people).
