= Breton Social-National Workers' Movement =

French political movement

The Breton Social-National Workers' Movement (French: Mouvement Ouvrier Social-National Breton) was a nationalist, separatist, and Fascist movement founded in 1941 by Théophile Jeusset. It emerged in Brittany from a deviationist faction of the Breton National Party; it disappeared the same year.

Its 25-point program was based on the principle of a "popular Breton state made for the people and by the people", integrated into a new European order, rejecting "Gaullism, the last redoubt of the Breton bourgeoisie" and resting on "the peasant class, the most numerous in Brittany", asserting "bread for Bretons, peace within Europe and freedom for Brittany", taking as given that it could count "not on England, nor France, nor Germany to acquire it", but only "through the power and confidence that one finds in the Breton people".

Having adopted for a flag a standard (designed by Olier Mordrel several years before) closely resembling a Nazi flag — black ermine at the center of a white circle on a red field representing "the blood of the worker" — Théophile Jeusset recruited several followers in the workshops and factories of Ille-et-Vilaine and organized about twenty meetings in the back rooms of restaurants in Rennes. Its founder renounced the dialectic, and embarked on direct action with a small group of Communist-separatists who it had joined his cause. He then took up a graffiti campaign directed against François Ripert (the préfet of Ille-et-Vilaine), and unleashed some of his comrades into the botanical garden of Rennes, to smash the statue of the "traitor" Bertrand du Guesclin.

== See also ==
- History of the French far right
- Breton nationalism and World War II
