= Émile Masson =

Émile Masson may refer to:

- Émile Masson (writer) (1869–1923), Breton writer and thinker
- Émile Masson (cyclist) (1888–1973), Belgian cyclist
- Émile Masson Jr. (1915–2011), Belgian cyclist
