= Radio Rennes Bretagne =

1940s radio station in France

Radio Rennes Bretagne (in Breton: Radio Roazon-Breiz) was a radio station based in Rennes, and the first station to offer regular Breton language programming. However, it was not powerful enough to broadcast to the Breton-speaking western parts of the peninsula. From November 1940 to June 1944, the station broadcast bilingual programming by switching over to Radio Paris for one hour each week.

Established under German patronage during World War II, the station was placed under the care of professor Leo Weisgerber, a linguist from Marburg and Sonderführer of the occupying German army. Acquired under the guise of the Breton cause, it became a vehicle for collaborationist ideas.

Roparz Hemon ran the station as Director of Programming. Hemon focused on cultural and intellectual themes, rather than explicitly political issues. Contributors were typically associated with the pre-war journal Gwalarn, which had been set up to promote a literary high culture in Breton. Unlike Radio Paris, Radio Rennes Bretagne never broadcast outright Nazi propaganda. However, racist ideas were subtly inserted into programmes which had high cultural content.

== Staff ==
Management team: Leo Weisgerber (Director); Roparz Hemon (Programming Director); Abeozen, Jean Trécan (Studio Management)

Presenters : Florian Le Roy (French speaker), Abeozen (Breton speaker), André Guellec, Guillaume Berthou, Youenn Drezen, Georges Lemée, Juliette Nizan, Job Jaffré, Yves Levot-Becot, Baillarge, Esnault.
