= Camille Le Mercier d'Erm =

French poet, historian and Breton nationalist

Camille Le Mercier d'Erm (1888 in Rennes – 1978 in Dinard) was a French poet, historian and Breton nationalist. He later adopted the neo-Bardic name Kammermor. He is also known as Kamil Ar Merser 'Erm, the Breton language form of his name. His work as a poet and historian is marked by nationalist claims and calls to rebellion against the French state on the model of Irish nationalism.

He was the grandson of a Chouan officer. He was based in Paris when in 1909 he published his first collections of poetry. The same year, in the Revue de l’Ouest, he wrote "Traditionalism and separatism", an article advocating separatist politics in defence of cultural tradition. His proposals caused a sensation. He was the principal founder of the Breton Nationalist Party in 1911, and was arrested when the party launched a protest in the same year at the official opening of a monument to the unity of Brittany and France. Le Mercier d'Erm also founded the activist journal Breiz Dishual (Free Brittany).

The party and journal folded in 1914 on the outbreak of World War I. Immediately after the war, Le Mercier d'Erm helped to found a replacement journal, Breiz Atao (Brittany Forever), which was created in 1919. He also continued to play a leading role among young Breton nationalist activists between the wars. He launched the newspaper La Bretagne libertaire in 1921, with the article "La Nation bretonne et l’Internationale" (The Breton nation and the Internationale). In 1941 on the occasion of the thirtieth anniversary of the Breton Nationalist Party, the newly formed Breton National Party (a different organisation) organised a heartfelt tribute to Le Mercier d'Erm, as a pioneer of Breton nationalism.

== Publications ==
- Le poème de Paris nocturne - Ed. Les Gémeaux. 1909.
- La Muse aux violettes - Ed. Sansot. 1909.
- Les exils - Ed. Sansot. 1909.
- Les poètes de Paris - Ed. Louis Michaud. 1911.
- Les ballades d'amour - Ed. Louis Michaud. 1912.
- Les rondeaux d'amour - Ed. Louis Michaud. 1912.
- Défense et illustration de la langue bretonne. Les éléments d'une littérature nationale. Edition du Parti Nationaliste Breton - s.l., Imprimerie Breiz Dishual. 1913.
- Le barde Mathaliz (Georges Le Rumeur): membre du gorsedd de Bretagne-armorique [...] Edition du Parti Nationaliste Breton, 1913.
- La question bretonne, le nationalisme et l'action française Edition du Parti Nationaliste Breton, 1913. Rennes, Imprimerie du Journal de Rennes
- Bretagne et Germanie - Ed. de l'Hermine. 1914.
- Les origines du nationalisme breton. Edition du Parti Nationaliste Breton, 1914.
- Jean-Michel Renaitour - Aviateur lyrique - Ed. Les Argonautes. 1917.
- Irlande à jamais, odes aux martyrs de 1916. Edition du Parti Nationaliste Breton - s.l., Imprimerie Artistique de l'Ouest, Niort. 1919
- La Guerre ? - Ed. Les Argonautes. 1919.
- Les bardes et poètes nationaux de la Bretagne armoricaine. Kelenn. 1919.
- Les hymnes nationaux des peuples celtiques - Ed. A l'Enseigne de l'Hermine. 1920.
- La Bretagne vue par les écrivains et les artistes - Ed. Vald. Rasmussen. 1925.
- La chanson des siècles bretons. Bilingue Breton-Français. Poems and popular songs inspired by the historical traditions of the Breton people presented with bibliographical notices and critiques, music and French translations. Dinard, à l'Enseigne de l'hermine, 1926
- Buez ar pevar mab emon. Duc d'Ordon. Laket e form eun dragedi. Seizvet moulladur embannet gant. Dinard, A l'enseigne de l'Hermine, 1928.
- La France pittoresque et artistique la Bretagne suivie d'un guide. Rasmussen, 1929.
- Les Saints Bretons de la côte d'Emeraude - Ed. de l'Hermine. 1934.
- L'Etrange Aventure de l'Armée de Bretagne, le Drame du Camp de Conlie et du Mans. 1939.
- Sang d'occident - Ed. de l'Hermine. 1965.
- Patrie perdue - Ed. de l'Hermine. 1973.
- Une Armée de Chouans - Ed. Perrin. 1975.
- Marcelle au Luxembourg - Ed. de L'Hermine. 1976.
- Eternités - Ed. de l'Hermine. 1978.
