= François Debeauvais =

Breton nationalist activist

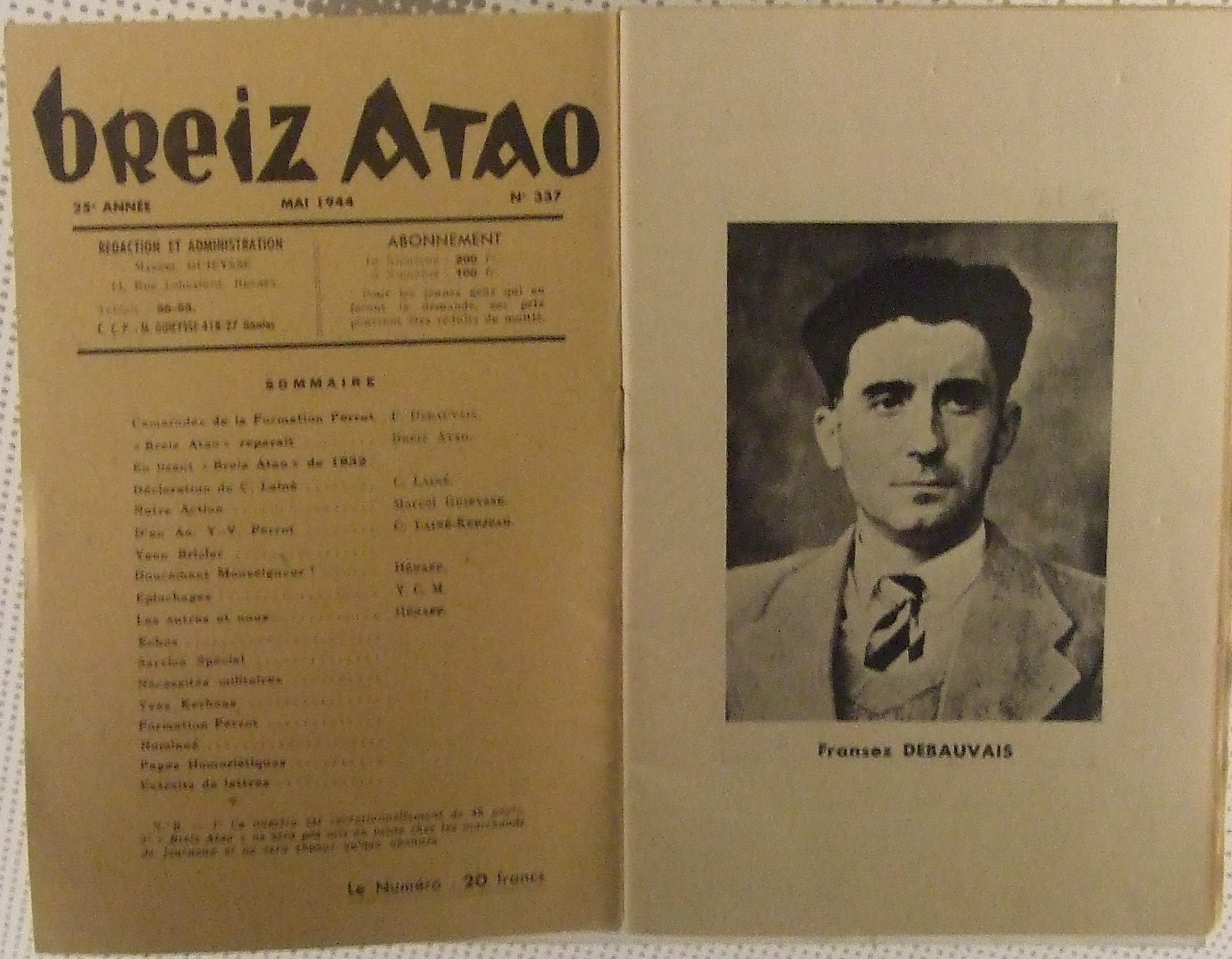
A 1944 copy of Breiz Atao, commemorating Debeauvais and containing his farewell address to the Bezen Perrot militia.

François Debeauvais (French pronunciation: [fʁɑ̃swa dəbovɛ]; 1902 in Rennes – 20 March 1944, Colmar) was a Breton nationalist and wartime collaborator with Nazi Germany. His name is also spelled in many "Breton" variants: François Debauvais, Fransez Debeauvais, Fransez Debauvais, Fañch Debeauvais, Fañch Debauvais, Fañch deb.

== Breiz Atao ==
Debeauvais was the son of a gardener from Le Pertre. Initially he worked as a pharmacist, but soon became an activist for Breton nationalism. He was associated with the founding of Breiz Atao (Brittany Forever), the Breton nationalist journal. He was named president of Unvaniez Yaounkiz Breiz, the Breton nationalist youth wing, in 1920. He quickly rose within the movement, becoming associated with the faction of Yann Bricler, and Olier Mordrel. He took part in Breiz Atao's Pan-Celtic Congress in Quimper in 1924, with Yann Sohier, Youenn Drezen, Jakez Riou, Abeozen and Marcel Guieysse. According to the memoirs of his wife Anna Youenou (a fellow member of Breiz Atao, whom he married in 1929) he was much influenced by Charles Maurras at this time. In 1930, he proposed the creation of a major weekly magazine to be called Le Peuple Breton (the Breton People), but was unable to secure sufficient funding.

== Breton National Party ==
With the split in Breton nationalism between federalists and independentists, François Debeauvais supported the latter and joined the newly formed Breton National Party. He continued as editor of Breiz Atao. He was also connected to the Gwenn-ha-du, the terrorist wing of the movement.

In March 1933, Breiz Atao published a programme named "SAGA" (Strollad Ar Gelted Adsavet: Programme of Revived Celts), which was worked out by Mordrel. Debeauvais was careful to present it as a proposal for the direction of the party, not as its policy. The fascistic and racist nature of Modrel's programme provoked criticism from many readers. In 1937, Debeauvais prevented Mordrel's extremist faction from seizing the power within the PNB.

Nevertheless, Debeauvais's views had much in common with Mordrel. During the late 1930s, both men forged links with the Nazi party. As World War II approached, the French government sought to prosecute him for seditious activities. After a period in exile in Belgium, Debeauvais was imprisoned for 6 months. On 14 December 1938 he and Mordrel were condemned to a further term for "attacking the unity of the nation". He was released on 25 July 1939, after apologising on 15 February 1939.

== Exile in Nazi Germany ==
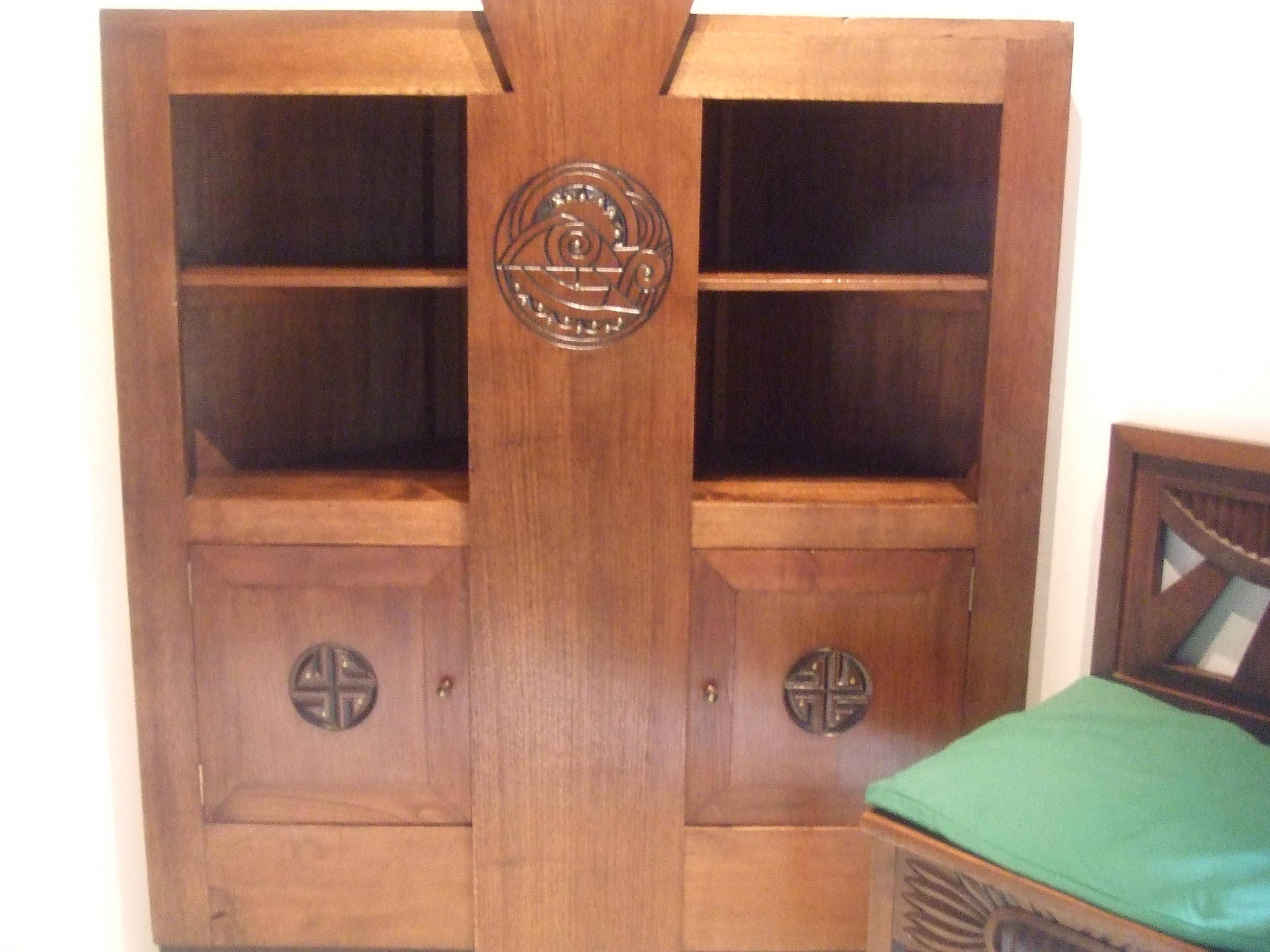
cabinet with swastika motifs designed by René-Yves Creston as a wedding present for Debauvais and Anna Youenou

With the declaration of the war between France and Germany, the Breton National Party was dissolved by the French government of Édouard Daladier. The party's property was confiscated and files destroyed; Debeauvais and Mordrel chose to go into exile rather than support France. From Amsterdam, Mordrel and Debeauvais addressed a proclamation to Bretons, condemning the war.

By the end of 1939 he had moved to Berlin "to try to play the card of Breton independence in the probable outcome of French defeat".

In Germany, the Pangermanist faction recommended the extension of the Reich to all the German-speaking populations and the dismantling of the great European powers according to linguistic criteria, a view consistent with Breton nationalism. The creation of a Breton State also found supporters among militarists who wished to break up France so that it would no longer rival Germany.

In January 1940, Debeauvais and Mordrel drafted a "War Letter" (Lizer Brezl) to their militant supporters, insisting that "a true Breton does not have the right to die for France". They added, "Our eternal enemies and our present ones are the French, it is they who have never ceased to wrong Brittany". In April 1940, in imitation of Roger Casement, he devised a project of unloading arms from a submarine on the coast of the Leon, to allow him to reconstitute the Breton National Party as a secret paramilitary group. He abandoned the plan after Mordrel intervened.

On 7 May 1940, he and Mordrel were tried in absentia by a military tribunal at Rennes for "attacking the external safety of the State and the integrity of the territory, maintenance or recruitment of a dissolved group, provocation of soldiers to desertion and treason". They were degraded militarily and condemned to death. At the beginning of May 1940, Debeauvais declared in Berlin a Breton "government in exile" (Bretonische Regierung). It was not however officially recognised by the Nazis. Nevertheless, the Nazis gave Debeauvais and Mordrel "stateless persons" passports, and sympathisers within the German secret service allowed them to travel freely.

Debeauvais returned from exile to France along with the victorious German army in June 1940, arriving in Brittany on 1 July. Later in the month, at the "Congress of Pontivy", Debeauvais and Mordrel created the Breton National Committee. They also founded a new journal, L'Heure Bretonne to replace Breiz Atao. 201 issues appeared between July 1940 and June 1944. Its first editor was Morvan Lebesque.

== Illness and death ==
In October 1940, Debeauvais's health suddenly worsened. He was diagnosed with tuberculosis and his doctors prescribed rest. He moved away from political activism, but did take part in the ousting of Mordrel from the Breton National Committee at the end of 1940 and the appointment of Raymond Delaporte to replace him.

His goal moved to establishing a National Socialist form of Breton nationalism devoted to communitarian policies of "anti-capitalism and anti-Judeo-Communism". He became secretary of the commission of the Celtic Institute of Brittany between 1941 and 1943.

In January 1944, suffering from severe tuberculosis, he entered a private clinic in Colmar. A last attempt to take back control of the party led to his support for the paramilitary groups set up by Célestin Lainé. He greeted the newly formed Perrot formation of Lainé's movement:

Comrades of the Perrot formation, I greet you.... It is not because we believe that Germany will emerge victorious from this gigantic conflict that, from the first day of the war, we were at its side. Our choice was not about opportunism, but a common vision of the world on essential points.... The situation has already been clarified, by returning to the policy of Breiz Atao which was very clear. This policy consisted, from the external point of view, to seek German support. We worked there with others, for nearly twenty years.

Shortly before his death he made his son join the Hitler Youth at Zillisheim. He died on 20 March 1944 in Colmar.

After the war, his widow Anna Youenou associated with the Breton nationalist clique in Paris. In 1968 she wrote an account of her husband's life.

== Bibliography ==
- Anna Youenou, Fransez Debauvais de Breiz-Atao et les siens. Mémoires du chef breton commentés par sa femme, Rennes, A. Youenou-Debauvais, s.d. (1974–1983), 6 volumes.
- Alain Deniel, Le mouvement breton, Maspéro, 1976, ISBN 2-7071-0826-X,
