= Kristian Hamon =

Breton historian

- Occupations: Historian; Academic

Academic work
- Discipline: History
- Sub-discipline: Breton History

Kristian Hamon is a Breton and French historian whose work focuses on collaboration in Brittany during World War II.

== Career in journalism ==
After a brief membership of Jeune Bretagne, which he denounced as right-wing, he joined the Breton Communist Party in 1973. At the end of the 1970s, he joined Canard de Nantes à Brest, worked for Libération in 1981, and then Lyon-Libération. At the end of the 1980s, he joined the daily newspaper the Var-Matin (Toulon). He also worked for a spell in publishing (Dargaud, Le Lombard).

== Research ==
He later returned to his studies, studying his master's (at L'Ouest-Éclair) on the German Occupation of France, receiving permission to study the department archives of Ille-et-Vilaine and focusing on the activities of the Parti national breton during the Second World War. His writing has been described as giving "an uncompromising picture of the political collaboration of the National Breton Party during the war" which "have received a rather cold reception in some parts of the Breton movement". Due to this uncompromising portrayal, the Breton nationalist party Adsav has attempted to disrupt a number of events attended by Hamon.

In February 2020 Hamon criticised the renaming of a road named after Youenn Drezen by the mayor of Pont-l'Abbé. The reason given for the renaming was Drezen's supposed Nazi collaboration during the second world war, particularly his alleged role as an informer against the French resistance, however Hamon stated that he knew of no evidence for this. Hamon's research instead identified Joseph Le Ruyet as the person who, in Hamon's view, had informed against the resistance fighters that Drezen is alleged to have informed against. In November 2021, a book by Hamon about Free French parachutists fighting in Brittany in 1944 during WW2 called Chez nous, il n’y a que des morts! ("with us there are only the dead!") was published by Skol Vreizh.

== Publications ==
- Michel Lagrée, Patrick Harismendy and Michel Denis, L'Ouest-Eclair. Naissance et essor d'un grand quotidien régional, Presses Universitaires de Rennes, 2000.
- Le Relecq-Kerhuon, Les nationalistes bretons sous l'occupation
- Yoran Embanner, Le Bezen Perrot : 1944, des nationalistes bretons sous l'uniforme allemand
- Skol Vreizh, Agents du Reich en Bretagne
