= L'Heure Bretonne =

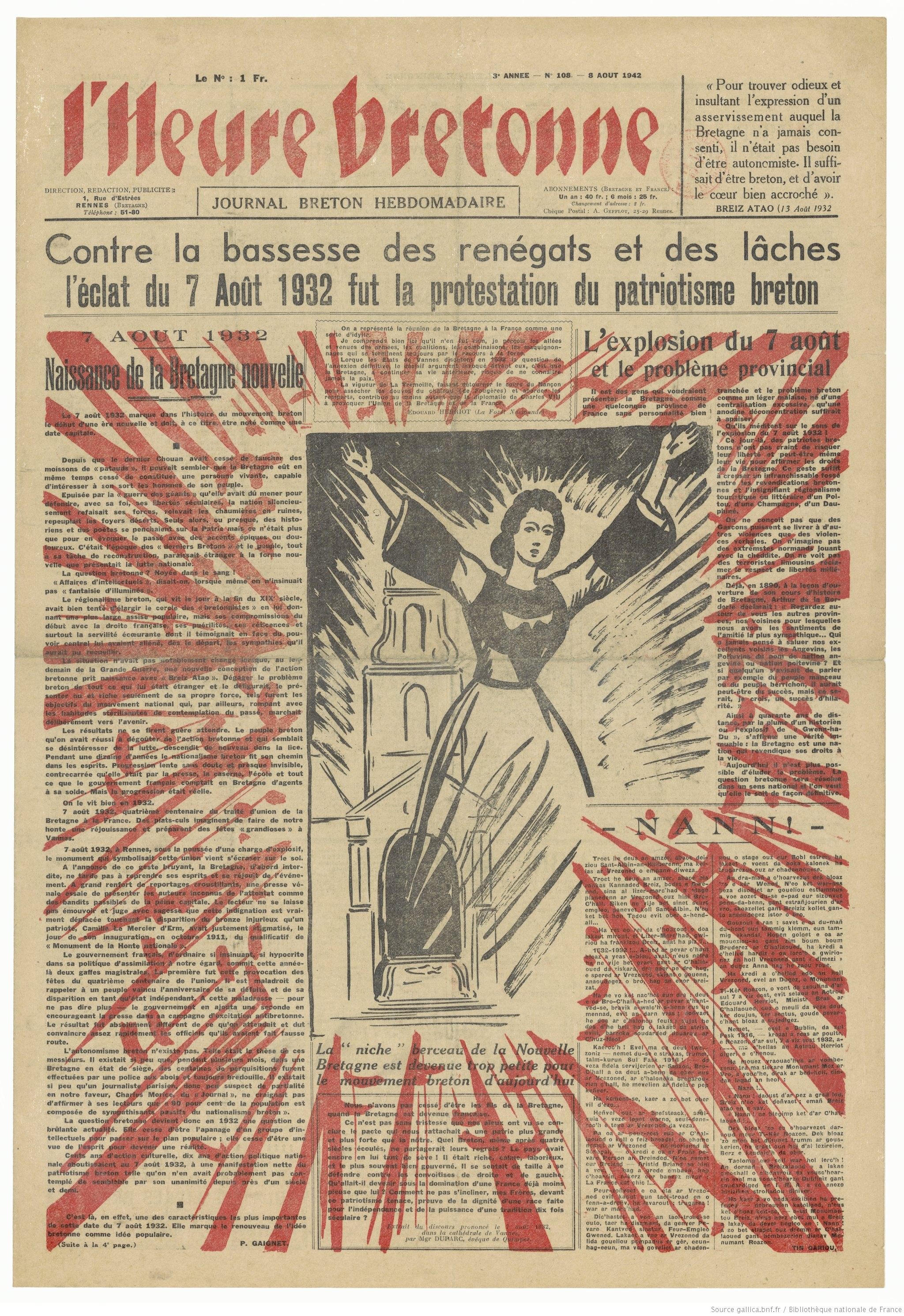
Issue of L'Heure Bretonne for 8 August 1942

L'Heure Bretonne (French pronunciation: [lœʁ bʁətɔn], "The Breton Times") was a Breton nationalist weekly newspaper which was published from June 1940 to June 1944. It was the organ of the Breton National Party and was strongly associated with collaborationist politics during World War II.

== Origins ==
In July 1940, after the Fall of France, the pro-German Breton nationalists François Debeauvais and Olier Mordrel called the Congress of Pontivy, at which they created the Breton National Committee to coordinate Breton nationalist projects. The committee decided to found the weekly newspaper L'Heure Bretonne. The first issue was symbolically dated 14 July (Bastille Day) 1940. The paper was in practice a continuation of the nationalists' earlier journal Breiz Atao.

== Publication ==
The newspaper was published in Rennes in the headquarters of the Breton National Committee. 201 issues were published between July 1940 and June 1944. Morvan Lebesque was its first editor, for two months in 1940. He later said he left when it became obvious that the Committee wanted the paper to pursue a pro-Nazi line. He was followed as editor by Jean Merrien, a close associate of Olier Mordrel, who left when Mordrel was ousted from the leadership of the Breton National Party.

By 1942 L'Heure Bretonne had a circulation of about 25,000 and employed fifty members of staff at its offices in Rennes.

In August 1940, some nationalists selling L'Heure Bretonne were detained at Quimper by the Germans, but after this incident, the paper was published and circulated without problems until June 4, 1944. Its editorial line was consistent with German propaganda. It attacked Jews, leftist "Jacobins" and the English. However, it also attacked the French in general, on behalf of the "Breton race ", and new "Aryan" Europe in which the Bretons would take an active role.

== Content ==
The content of the newspaper reflects its intransigent separatist politics and repeated challenge to the Vichy government. The newspaper took particular care to avoid offending the German occupying forces. However it did not adopt explicitly Nazi ideological rhetoric, despite its solidarity with Germany's war effort, with weekly articles recounting the exploits of the Wehrmacht in Russia. The attitude of the paper was expressed by former communist Abeozen in November 1940:

I would rather clasp vigorously the hand of the passers-by, singing their conquest song, and stare right into their eyes without the least hatred. Because I have sound reasons for believing that the conquerors of the West will not hinder us in the slightest in the success of our task : to build a New Brittany on the ruins of the old World.

The main themes addressed by the newspaper are the history of Brittany, the misdeeds of Vichy France and a repeated and extreme Anglophobia. It also covered daily life in Brittany, with articles on the peasantry, crafts, modern Breton design, and so on.

== Antisemitism ==
Following the mass arrest of Jews in Paris known as the Vel' d'Hiv Roundup on 16 and 17 July 1942, L'Heure Bretonne published a front-page article entitled À la porte les juifs et les enjuivés ("Show Jews and the Judaized the Door") under the signature "DR" (No. 105, July 18, 1942).

In the same vein, Job Jaffré, under his pseudonym "Tug", published a denunciation of the bombings committed by the forces of "youtre-Atlantique", a wordplay on "outre-Atlantique" ("over the Atlantic") and "youtre", a derogatory term for "Jew" (April 1943, No. 142). Later in the same year, he wrote that he expected a "reversal of alliance... when the Jewish problem has been eliminated" (October 1943, No. 171, under the initials St. K.)

== See also ==
- History of French far-right movements
- Breton nationalism and World War II

== Bibliography ==
- Bertrand Frélaut, Les nationalistes bretons de 1939 à 1945, Brasparts, Beltan, 1985.
- L'Heure bretonne. Journal breton hebdomadaire, from July 1940 to (Mai 1944)
