= Esnault =

Esnault is a French surname. Notable people with the surname include:

- Hélène Esnault (born 1953), French mathematician
- Gilles Esnault, French painter
- Patrice Esnault (born 1961), French cyclist
- Tony Esnault, French chef

== See also ==
- Robert Esnault-Pelterie (1881–1957), French aircraft designer and spaceflight theorist
