= Saint-Sauveur, Finistère =

Saint-Sauveur An Dre-Nevez
- Commune
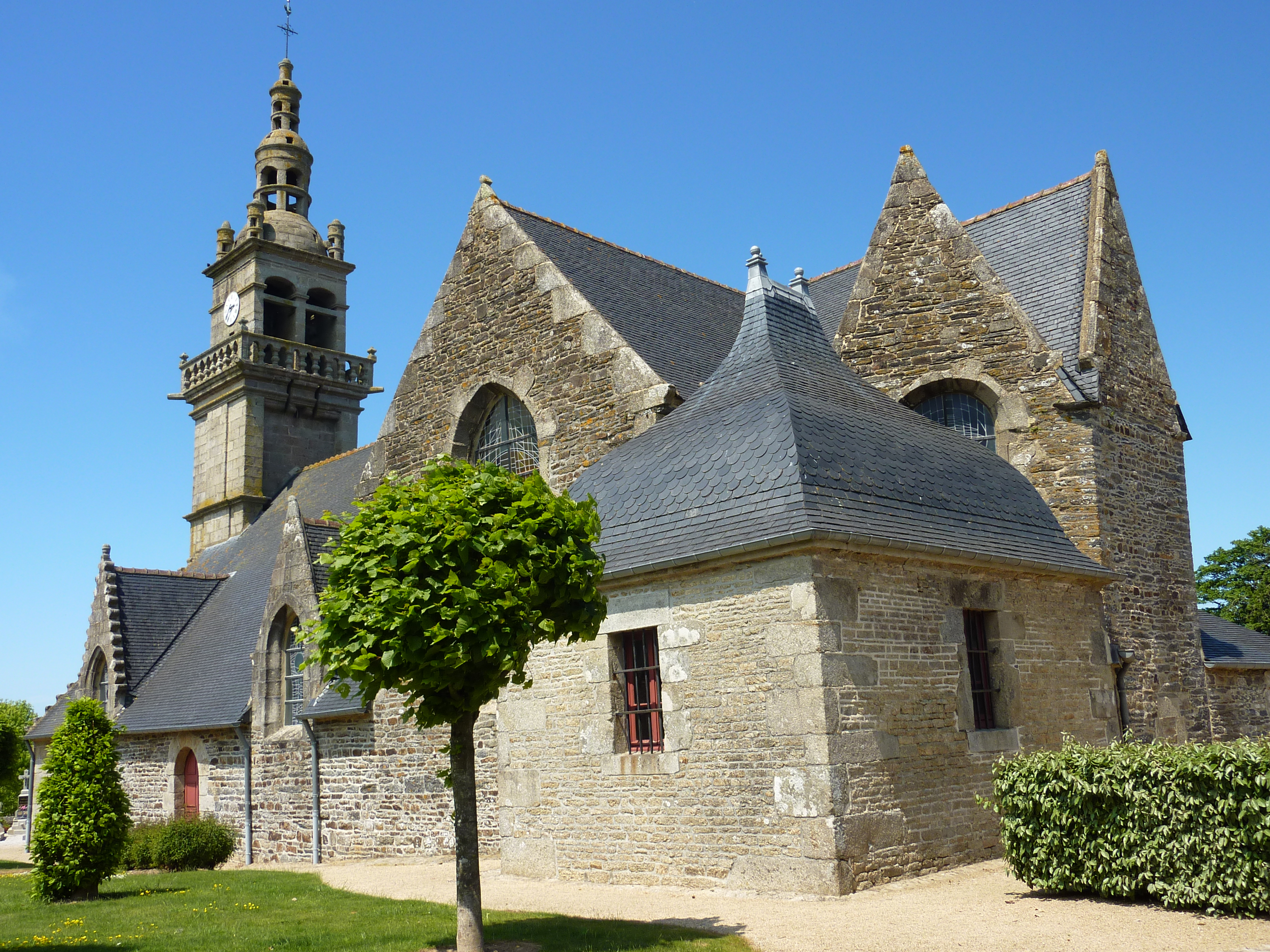
- The parish church in Saint-Sauveur

- Coat of arms
- Location of Saint-Sauveur
- Location within France Location within Brittany
- Coordinates: 48°26′50″N 4°00′16″W
- Country: France
- Region: Brittany
- Department: Finistère
- Arrondissement: Morlaix
- Canton: Landivisiau
- Intercommunality: Pays de Landivisiau

Government
  - Mayor (2020–2026): Thierry Ramonet
- Area^{1}: 13.24 km^{2} (5.11 sq mi)
- Highest elevation: 202 m (663 ft)
- Lowest elevation: 86 m (282 ft)
- Population (2023): 849
  - Density: 64.1/km^{2} (166/sq mi)
- Time zone: UTC+01:00 (CET)
  - Summer (DST): UTC+02:00 (CEST)
- INSEE/Postal code: 29262 /29400
- ^{1} French Land Register data, which excludes lakes, ponds, glaciers > 1 km^{2} (0.386 sq mi or 247 acres) and river estuaries.

Saint-Sauveur (French pronunciation: [sɛ̃ sovœʁ]; Breton: An Dre-Nevez) is a commune in the Finistère department of Brittany in north-western France.

== Population ==
Historical population
Year	Pop.	±% p.a.
1968	734	—
1975	646	−1.81%
1982	635	−0.25%
1990	654	+0.37%
1999	636	−0.31%
2007	735	+1.82%
2012	793	+1.53%
2017	790	−0.08%
2023	849	+1.21%
Source: INSEE

Inhabitants of Saint-Sauveur are called in French Salvatoriens.

== See also ==
- Communes of the Finistère department
- Roland Doré sculptor Sculptor local cross
