= Breiz Atao =

Former Breton nationalist journal

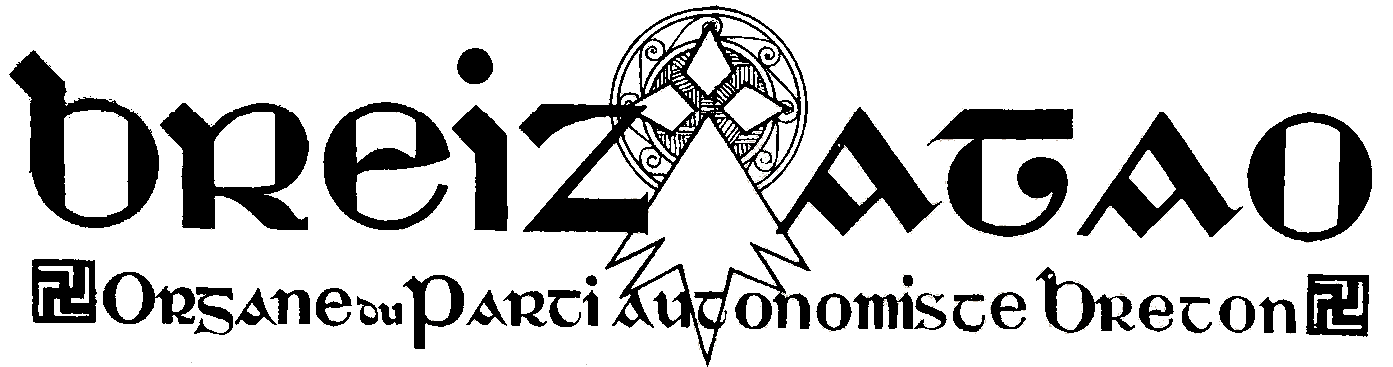

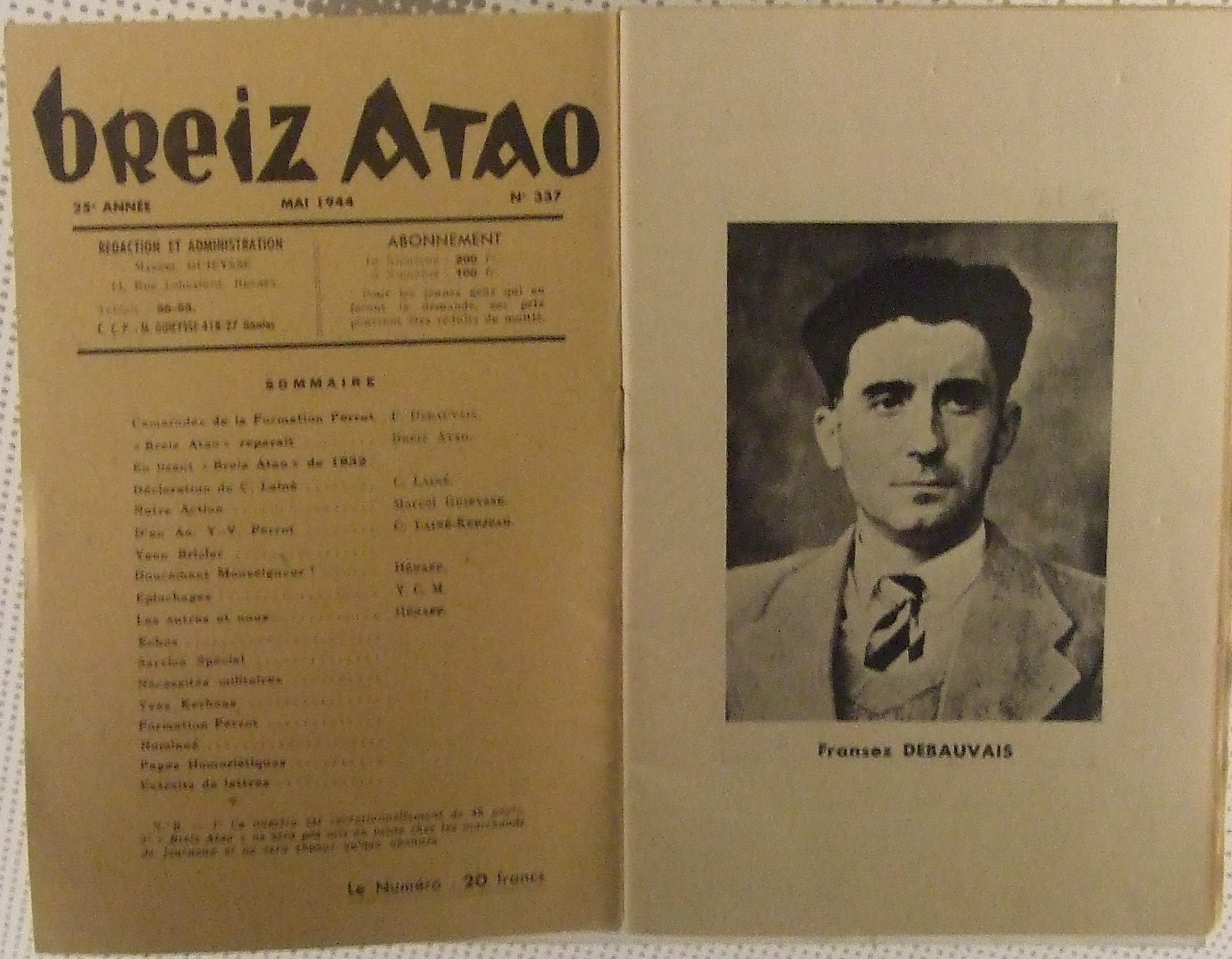
- An issue of Breiz Atao from 1944, promoting the formation of Célestin Lainé's militia and Francois Debeauvais's article on the alliance of Breton nationalism with Nazism.
- Founded: 1919
- Ceased publication: 1939, briefly revived in 1944
- Political alignment: Groupe Régionaliste Breton (1919-1927); Breton Autonomist Party (1927-1931); Breton National Party (1931-1939)
- Language: Breton, French
- Country: France

Breiz Atao (also Breizh Atao) (in Breton: Brittany For Ever cf. Breizh atav), was a Breton nationalist journal in the mid-twentieth century. It was written in French, and has always been considered as a French nationalist journal by the non-francized Bretons. The term is also used for the broader movement associated with the journal's political position.

Founded in 1918 in the aftermath of World War I, Breiz Atao would exist throughout the inter-war years. It was highly influenced by the Irish War of Independence, which began in 1916 and whose aftermath ran into the 1920s. Early on, it adopted an official pan-Celtic policy, and a strong pan-Latin use of the French language. In its later years it became associated with a Nordicist blood and soil ideology with aspects in common with Nazism. It ceased publication in 1940, but was revived for an individual issue that appeared in 1944.

== History ==
=== First series: organ of the Groupe régionaliste breton (1918–1927) ===
The first Breiz Atao was founded in January 1919 by the Groupe régionaliste breton, a youth organisation initially composed primarily of right-wing activists. Its editorial line was broad: while some contributors rejected Marxism, others on the left were also published. Circulation grew steadily in the early 1920s but remained limited by financial constraints, professional commitments of members, and content that appealed mainly to intellectuals rather than the working class.

Published monthly from 1919 to July 1927 (issues 1–103), the periodical was edited at 8 rue Édith Cavell in Rennes, the home of its director François Debeauvais. Early issues were modest (four pages, 500 copies) due to paper shortages and lack of funds. The masthead originally featured a coat of arms with Breton ermines; this was later dropped as the movement moved away from regionalism. From 1923 the layout became more ambitious, adopting Art Deco influences designed by Olier Mordrel, increasing to 16 pages and costing 50 centimes. In 1925, it reverted to monochrome and fewer pages for cost reasons. A new masthead inspired by the Seiz Breur movement appeared in June 1926.

Art and aesthetics occupied a prominent place. Morvan Marchal argued that nation and art were inseparable. The periodical contained numerous illustrations, often woodcuts, in line with other post-World War I Breton movement publications. From 1925 it used the Hévoud symbol, abandoned around 1930 because of its resemblance to the Nazi swastika.

Initially regionalist, the periodical gradually broke with mainstream Breton regionalism, criticising ties to France and Catholicism. By the mid-1920s it embraced pan-Celticism (exchanging correspondence with Welsh nationalists) and expressed interest in other minority national movements (Flemish, Catalan, etc.).

From March 1925 to July 1926 Breiz Atao included a literary supplement entirely in Breton, Gwalarn, directed by Roparz Hemon.

=== Second series: organ of the Parti autonomiste breton (1927–1931) ===
Following the September 1927 congress of Rosporden, the Groupe régionaliste breton became the Parti autonomiste breton (PAB). The periodical (issues 1–145, September 1927 – June 1931) aimed to become biweekly and eventually daily, targeting workers, peasants, and fishermen. Militants were responsible for distribution.

Layout evolved: from February 1929 it appeared weekly on four pages, peaking at 8,000 copies printed (1,200 subscribers). Special issues reached 20,000–50,000 copies. The title used Bauhaus lettering for “Breiz” and Celtic-style for “Atao”. The Hévoud appeared on the masthead from April 1928 but was removed the following year because of its similarity to the swastika.

Content focused on Brittany’s economic difficulties, blaming the French state and presenting autonomy as the solution. International news occasionally appeared, condemning fascism and Nazism.

Internal tensions between federalist and nationalist factions led to a split in 1931. Federalists launched La Nation bretonne (with Breiz Atao as subtitle); nationalists under Debeauvais reclaimed the original title but ceased publication for lack of funds.

=== Third series: organ of the Parti national breton (1931–1939) ===
The Parti national breton (PNB) relaunched Breiz Atao in November 1931 (issues 1/146 – 146, double numbering claiming continuity with the PAB series). Early issues were modest (8–16 pages) and subscriptions fell sharply.

After the 1932 Gwenn ha Du bombings, a new formula appeared on 21 August 1932. Economic and social criticism resumed. The March 1933 “SAGA” programme proposed a corporatist alternative to capitalism and Marxism but was shelved amid controversy.

The periodical supported PNB electoral campaigns and, from 1934, proposed a “Front Breton”. It defended national minorities worldwide (Saar, Ethiopia, Spain) and advocated autonomy as the solution.

From 1936 to 1937, the editorial line shifted toward pro-German positions, seeing an impending Franco-German war as an opportunity. Mordrel’s pro-Nazi sympathies prevailed after the 1937 Carhaix congress. The periodical adopted an increasingly fascist tone, supporting German policies during the Sudeten crisis and Anschluss.

Repression intensified in 1938–1939; distribution was banned in barracks, and Debeauvais and Mordrel were convicted for seditious articles. Publication ceased with the outbreak of World War II (last issue: 27 August 1939).

=== Fourth series (1944) ===
During the German occupation, the PNB briefly revived the title. François Debeauvais, opposing Raymond Delaporte’s leadership, bequeathed rights to the title to Célestin Lainé in January 1944. One issue (no. 337) appeared promoting Lainé’s Bezen Perrot militia and containing an article by Debeauvais justifying collaboration. Printing was halted by Allied bombing. A final clandestine issue (no. 339) appeared in November 1947, written by Lainé in exile in Ireland.

== Legacy ==
During the interwar period, “Breiz Atao” became synonymous with the Breton movement, especially its nationalist wing.

The title briefly reappeared in roneotyped form in 1961.

From 2010 to early 2022 the name was used by Breizatao.com, a far-right, neo-Nazi website run by Boris Le Lay. The site was ordered closed by French courts in 2020 for incitement to hatred and glorification of terrorism.

== See also ==
- Breton nationalism and World War II
- History of far-right movements in France

== Bibliography ==
- Déniel, Alain (1976). Le Mouvement breton (1919-1945) (in French). Maspero. ISBN 978-2-7071-6826-9.
- Carney, Sébastien (2016). "Les couvertures de Breiz Atao : dire la Bretagne, toujours ?". Dire la Bretagne (in French). Presses universitaires de Rennes.
- Calvez, Ronan; Carney, Sébastien (2016). "Une esthétique nationaliste bretonne ?". Dire la Bretagne (in French). Presses universitaires de Rennes.
- Carney, Sébastien (2015). Breiz Atao ! : Mordrel, Delaporte, Lainé, Fouéré : une mystique nationale (1901-1948) (in French). PUR.
- Cadiou, Georges (2013). "Breiz Atao". EMSAV : Dictionnaire critique, historique et biographique : Le mouvement breton de A à Z du XIXe à nos jours (in French). Coop Breizh.
