= Gwalarn =

Gwalarn ("Northwesterly") was a Breton language literary journal. By extension, the term refers to the style of literature that it encouraged. 166 issues (numbered from 0 to 165) appeared between 1925 and May 1944.

The journal was founded by Roparz Hemon and Olier Mordrel.

== Manifesto ==
The journal published a manifesto in February 1925. The manifesto stated the aim of Gwalarn was to prove that the Breton language could become a vehicle for high culture. This was written in response to some French authors, including Victor Hugo, who had alleged that Breton was nothing more than the crude speech of peasants:

Gwalarn is above all something new and unique: a literary magazine aimed at the Breton elite, and whose ambition is nothing less than setting Breton literature on the road that follows the longstanding literature of many small nations: Bohemia, Flanders, Catalonia, among others...For the first time, a Breton revue will publish a pure literature, closing the door on patois... [it] will adopt a language of classical formality with a rigorous orthography. Gwalarn is an experiment: to determine whether there is an audience in Brittany educated enough to understand literary language (as far from the language of the Breton peasant as that of Mr. France is of the French peasant), a public informed enough to engage with a Breton literature that, while seeking to tap the sap in the genius of the race, wants to be European in spirit, drawing on modern European literary techniques, both in expression and in thought.

== Contents ==
The main contributors were mostly very young. In addition to Hemon, the most important writers were Abeozen, Youenn Drezen, Jakez Riou, Gwilherm Berthou, Yannn-Eozen Jarl, Kenan Kongar, Fant Rozec, Xavier de Langlais, and Maodez Glanndour. These writers produced the "classic" literary Breton of the twentieth century.

The content was varied. Gwalarn regularly published literary translations into Breton of foreign authors and poets, including William Shakespeare, Nathaniel Hawthorne, Boccaccio, J. M. Synge, and Alexander Pushkin. Great emphasis was placed on Celtic mythology and legends, including the Welsh mythology preserved in the Mabinogion. Essays on philosophy and Indo-European cultures were also common, including discussions of Hinduism and Buddhism. Additionally, Gwalarn published poems, plays, and essays on contemporary concerns.

== History ==
Olier Mordrel no longer participated in the journal after 1928, but Roparz Hemon stayed on as an editor until the last issue. Gradually, Gwalarn expanded, producing a popular supplement "kannadig Gwalarn" in 1932 and books for children. The latter were distributed free in schools to children who had participated in essay competitions in the Breton language.

Associated with collaborationist politics during World War II, the magazine was linked to the Breton language radio station Radio Rennes Bretagne, which was set up by the Germans. In consequence, it was forced to close after the Liberation of France. After the war, a new magazine with the same function was created under the title Al Liamm, which continued the project of creating a Breton literary culture.
