= Olier Mordrel =

Breton nationalist and Axis collaborator

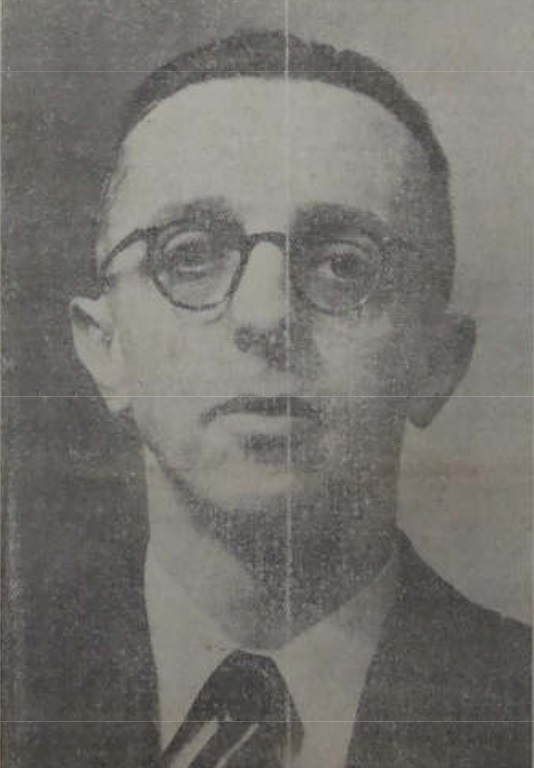
Olier Mordrel

Olier Mordrel (29 April 1901 – 25 October 1985) is the Breton language version of Olivier Mordrelle, a Breton nationalist and wartime collaborator with the Third Reich who founded the separatist Breton National Party. Before the war, he worked as an architect. His architectural work was influenced by Art Deco and the International style of Le Corbusier. He was also an essayist, short story writer, and translator. Mordrel wrote some of his works under the pen names Jean de La Bénelais, J. La B, Er Gédour, A. Calvez, Otto Mohr, Brython, and Olivier Launay.

== Early life ==
The son of a Corsican woman who had married General Joseph Mordrelle (died in 1942), Olier Mordrel was born in Paris and spent most of his childhood there (paradoxically, the place where he also learned Breton). After studies at the École des Beaux-Arts, he became an architect in Quimper for ten years.

He joined Breiz Atao in 1919 and became president of Unvaniez Yaouankiz Vreiz ("Youth Union of Brittany") in 1922. Together with Roparz Hemon, he created the literary magazine Gwalarn (1925), and was included in the Breton delegation to the First Pan-Celtic Congress in Dublin (alongside François Jaffrennou, Morvan Marchal, and Yves Le Drézen). Subsequently, Mordrel became co-president of the Breton Autonomist Party (Parti Autonomiste Breton, or PAB), and then its secretary for propaganda. During the same year, he started mixing his political and aesthetical ideals, adapting Art Deco to Breton themes, and aligning himself with the Breton art movement Seiz Breur.

In 1932, he created the Breton National Party (PNB), a nationalist and separatist Breton movement that would be outlawed by Prime Minister Édouard Daladier in October 1939, for its connections with Nazi Germany. In an article he contributed to the 11 December 1932 Breiz Atao, Mordrel launched an anti-semitic attack, one aiming to add National-socialist rhetoric to his discourse against French centralism: "Jacobin rime avec Youppin" – translatable as "Jacobin rhymes with Yid". The same year, he conceived the Strollad Ar Gelted Adsavet (SAGA, Party of Risen Celts) and its Nazi-like platform – which included Bretons in the Nordic "master race".

Mordrel also launched Stur, a magazine which displayed the swastika in its title, and the 1936 Peuples et Frontières (initially titled Bulletin des minorités nationales de France), which served as the voice for separatist minority ethnic groups throughout Europe. A noted contributor was the Alsatian Hermann Bickler, who later became a Gestapo commander. On 14 December 1938 Mordrel and François Debeauvais were each sentenced to one-year suspended imprisonment for "attack on the nation's unity".

== Architecture ==
Throughout this period Mordrel was working as an architect. He created a number of buildings in Quimper which were the most advanced examples of modern architecture in the city, adopting the Streamline Moderne style. The most important of these is the Ty-Kodak building at the new-town area of cité Kerguelen. It has been described as "the most original and much the most beautiful" of modern buildings in the city. It was constructed in 1933. The building has a wrap-around structure comparable to work by Le Corbusier and alternates smooth white surface with blue tiling. According to the architectural critic Daniel Le Couedic, the "gentle sweep" of the broad white bands around the corner is contrasted dramatically with the strong angular and stabilising vertical structures of the windows. It is signed with the architect's name on the boulevard facade.

Several other Mordrel buildings are no longer extant, including his Garage d’Odet, a garage/factory designed to use modernist style to achieve space for maximum efficiency of manufacturing and repair.

== Bretonische Regierung ==
Just before World War II erupted in 1939, Mordrel, Debeauvais, and their families (including Debeauvais's wife, Anna Youenou, who has since published an account of the travel) left for Berlin, via Belgium and the Netherlands. While in Amsterdam, the two leaders issued a manifesto calling for the Bretons not to back the French forces. A Lizer Brezel ("Letter of War") they wrote to PNB members in January 1940 stated that "a real Breton does not have the right to die for France" and "our enemies are first and foremost the French, it is they who have not ceased causing misfortune to Brittany".

A military tribunal in Rennes tried Debeauvais and Mordrel in absentia and sentenced them to death for separatist activities, treason, maintaining active a banned group, and incitement to desertion or treason. In early May, the Germans awarded Mordrel the leadership of a self-designated government in exile, the Bretonische Regierung; nonetheless, the two Bretons were not given the status of "leaders of Brittany", and the German passports they carried read stateless (Statenlos). They were allowed to travel only because of their connections with influential German army officers. With the start of the German occupation of France, the activists returned to Brittany on 1 July, re-founded the PNB, and Mordrel started printing L'Heure Bretonne (edited by Morvan Lebesque).

== During the Occupation ==
By the end of June and early July, Breton independentists could take it for granted that Brittany could be independent when a military governor was appointed to rule over the five départements of ancient Brittany. After a self-designated Congress in Pontivy founded the Breton National Committee, Mordrel took charge of the PNB in late October, and subsequently led a campaign against Vichy France that was tacitly encouraged by the Germans. His relation with Célestin Lainé became tense after Lainé's paramilitary Lu Brezhon started competing with the National Committee in October. Mordrel's actions against Vichy did not have the intended effect, and the PNB's appeal was minimal; at the same time, Germany had started placing its trust with Vichy leader Philippe Pétain, and in the end, supported Mordrel's ousting from the Committee in December. He seems to have been disappointed with the PNB's position himself. In November, he stated: "Our force is within ourselves. Neither Vichy nor Berlin will render the Breton people the necessary status for self-determination, regrouping, and giving itself a path. Our fate is being decided in our fibres... Let us not expect anything that is not from ourselves". He resigned his positions with the PNB and its journal, being replaced by Raymond Delaporte.

Mordrel was assigned residence in Germany: first in Stuttgart, then, from January 1941, in Berlin. However, he was barred from Brittany and from separatist activism. Leo Weisgerber offered him the position of Celtic languages professor at the University of Bonn and orchestrated his return to Paris in May. He was allowed to settle in Mayenne, where he was frequently visited and consulted by his Breton friends – including Jean Merrien, Rafig Tullou, Jean Trécan, and René-Yves Creston; throughout 1943, he kept contacts with his fellow writer and Occupation regime figure Louis-Ferdinand Céline. In September Mordrel was allowed to return to Rennes, where, while both the PNB leadership and Vichy agents called on the Germans to expel him, he was kept as an alternative by the Nazi authorities. After 1942 he was again even allowed to edit Stur.

== 1945, exile, and return ==
After the Allied invasion during the battle of Normandy, Brittany was taken on 13 August 1944, and Mordrel was forced to flee to Germany. In February 1945 Mordrel began talks with French fascist leader Jacques Doriot and his Parti Populaire Français, Mordrel acting on his own. The two sides agreed on a programme of Breton independence within a "Swiss-like" federation. After being briefly active in the umbrella group created by Doriot, he had to flee to Italy, where his wife died in the difficult conditions to which the couple on the run was reduced. Seeing no way out, he gave himself up to the American army. He was detained and interrogated for several months by the secret service. He saved his life by telling everything he knew of his fellow Breton separatists, the members of the Irish Republican Army and relations with different German secret services. In an agreement with the head of the British secret services, he was released but was officially declared to have escaped from prison because the new French authorities claimed him for execution. Again “on the run”, but with the backing of the American secret services, he found refuge in Brazil, then Argentina, and finally in Francoist Spain. He was again sentenced to death in absentia, in June 1946, but continued to contribute material to the magazine Ar Vro as Brython.

Mordrel returned to France incognito in 1972 and continued writing for La Bretagne Réelle as Otto Mohr (a name he had used in 1940), as well as editing several books – including a history of the Waffen-SS (Waffen SS d'Occident). In the 1980s, he was among the founders of Kelc'h Maksen Wledig ("Emperor Maxentius' Circle"), together with such figures of the far right as Yann Ber Tillenon and Georges Pinault; later, he was active in the GRECE, an organization associated with extremist politics, led by Alain de Benoist. Nonetheless, in the 1981 presidential race, Mordrel backed Socialist candidate François Mitterrand.

Mordrel's son Tristan Mordrelle (pen name André Chelain) is a far-right historical revisionist who runs the Association bretonne de recherche historique (ABRH) and edits its journal L'Autre Histoire.

== Works ==
- Pensée d'un nationaliste Breton, (Breiz Atao 1921–1927), Les Nouvelles Éditions Bretonnes, 1933
- La Galerie bretonne
- translation of The Lay of the Love and Death of Cornet Christopher Rilke by Rainer Maria Rilke – Kanenn hini Langenau, Kenwerzel Breiz, Rennes
- Breiz Atao, histoire et actualité du nationalisme Breton, Alain Moreau, 1973.
- La voie Bretonne, Nature et Bretagne, Quimper, 1975.
- L'essence de la Bretagne, essay, Guipavas, Éditions Kelenn, 1977
- Les hommes-dieux, stories in Celtic mythology, Paris, Copernic, 1979
- L'Idée Bretonne, Éditions Albatros, 1981
- Le mythe de l'hexagone, Picollec, 1981.
- La Bretagne, Nathan, 1983.
