= Émile Masson (writer) =

Breton nationalist (1869–1923)

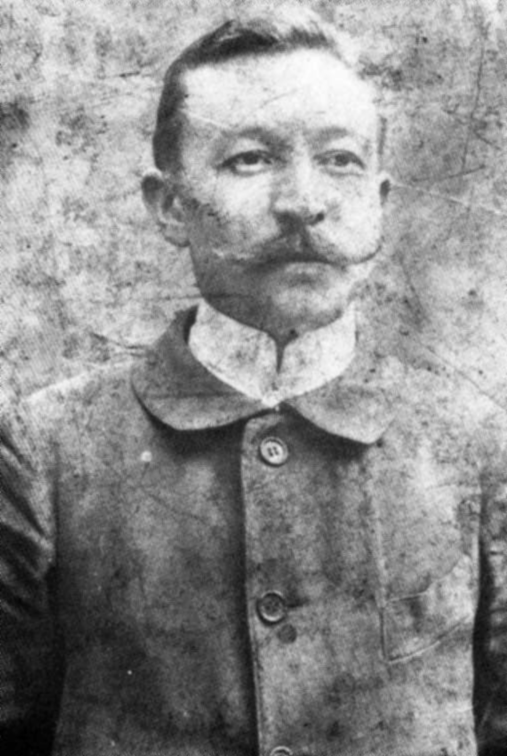
Émile Masson

Émile Masson (28 July 1869–8 February 1923) was a Breton writer and thinker. He also used the pseudonyms Brenn, Ewan Gweznou, and Ion Prigent.

== Biography ==
Born in Brest, he was not brought up speaking Breton, but acquired the language in later life. He received two degrees (philosophy and English) and moved to Paris. He was associated with several radical movements of the period: the dreyfusards, anarchism, collectivism, antimilitarism. At this time he befriended Élisée Reclus, Kropotkin and Romain Rolland. He took part in the universitaire populaires (1899–1905). Returning to Brittany, he became a professor of English at Pontivy High School. He translated many works by Thomas Carlyle into French.

In 1911, he became vice president of the literary section of the Breton Regionalist Union. In the same year he was one of the founders of the Breton Nationalist Party, and an editor of its journal Breiz Dishual ("Free Brittany"). He was the founder in 1913 of the journal Brug, an anarchist magazine in the Breton language. At this time he defined himself as a libertarian socialist. A fierce Internationalist, he tried to reconcile this aspect of his thinking with his Breton nationalism. In 1914, like Jean Jaurès, he pleaded for peace. During the First World War he continued his pacifist fight, maintaining regular correspondence with Romain Rolland. Exhausted, he died on 8 February 1923, aged 53.

== Publications ==
- Yves Madec, professeur de collège, 1905
- Brenn (pseudonym of Emile Masson), Les rebelles, Librairie les pages libres, 1908
- Les Bretons et le Socialisme, Éditions Toullec et Geffroy 1912, introduction and notes by Jean-Yves Guiomar, Paris, Maspero, 1972.
- Les hommes illustres et leurs paroles inouïes, en 1919
- L’Utopie des îles bienheureuses dans le Pacifique. Éditions Rieder 1921, Editions Caligrammes, 1984.

== Bibliography ==
- Émile Masson, professeur de liberté (J. Didier Giraud and Marielle Giraud) Éditions Canope, 1991
- Émile Masson, prophète et rebelle (proceedings of the Emile Masson colloquium at Pontivy, 26, 27 et 28 septembre 2003, under the direction of J.-Didier and Marielle Giraud ; preface by Edmond Hervé). Rennes : Presses universitaires de Rennes, 2005. 349 p.-[4] p. de pl., 23 cm. ISBN 2-7535-0058-4.
