= Breton Nationalist Party =

Defunct political party in France

The Breton Nationalist Party (Parti nationaliste breton, or PNB) was a French political party that advocated independence for Brittany. It existed from 1911 to 1914.

== Origins ==
It was founded in October 1911 under the patronage of a committee of seven members, including Camille Le Mercier d'Erm, Louis Napoleon Le Roux, Georges Le Rumeur, Edouard Guéguen and Emile Masson. The immediate cause of the party's foundation was the proposal to erect a monument to celebrate the unity of Brittany with France, a process which had been finalised by the 1532 treaty of union. The goal of the party was to "always and repeatedly protest against French oppression, and prepare for the resurrection of Brittany in condemnation of this movement regarding the French people depriving this country of the national independence which is its right." It advocated severing all ties between Brittany and France.

The PNB sought to unite the burgeoning Breton political movement, even though other groups already existed, most notably Bleun Brug (Heather Flower) created in 1905 by the Abbe Jean-Marie Perrot with its journal Feiz ha Breiz (Faith and Brittany). In contrast to the purely Catholic Bleun Brug, the PNB included political radicals, libertarians and leftists, along with conservatives.

At its inception, it published a manifesto and proposed a Breton national holiday on September 29, the anniversary of the coronation of Nominoë, first Duke of Brittany, and of the victory won in 1364 at the Battle of Auray by John V, Duke of Brittany against the French army of Charles de Blois.

=== Manifesto ===
- Article 4. We have had stolen in succession our national independence, then our local freedoms and provincial franchises, in constant violation of the Treaty of 1532 which provided these freedoms and these franchises for our country, including the privilege of a parliament and the right to bear arms: all this in lieu of lost sovereignty — the ermine bonnet encircled in gold (derisory compensation it is true, for this glory that we lost). Since the French Revolution, the situation has worsened. Today, the insidious persecution from our masters, all the more dangerous as it is hidden and burrows under our hallowed soil, sought to wrest from us our language and our customs, our civil and religious traditions: whatever remains of the former national heritage, everything that makes our pride and our joy. We oppose with all our strength, and we reclaim the legacy of our ancestors.
- Article 5. One believes us crushed, annihilated, assimilated, Frenchified? Not so! There still exists in the soul of Brittany, something that resists and that survives, something that will not be suppressed, destroyed, and which remains alive and robust today as in the time of our independence and that, conscious or unconscious, is the National sentiment.

== Activities ==
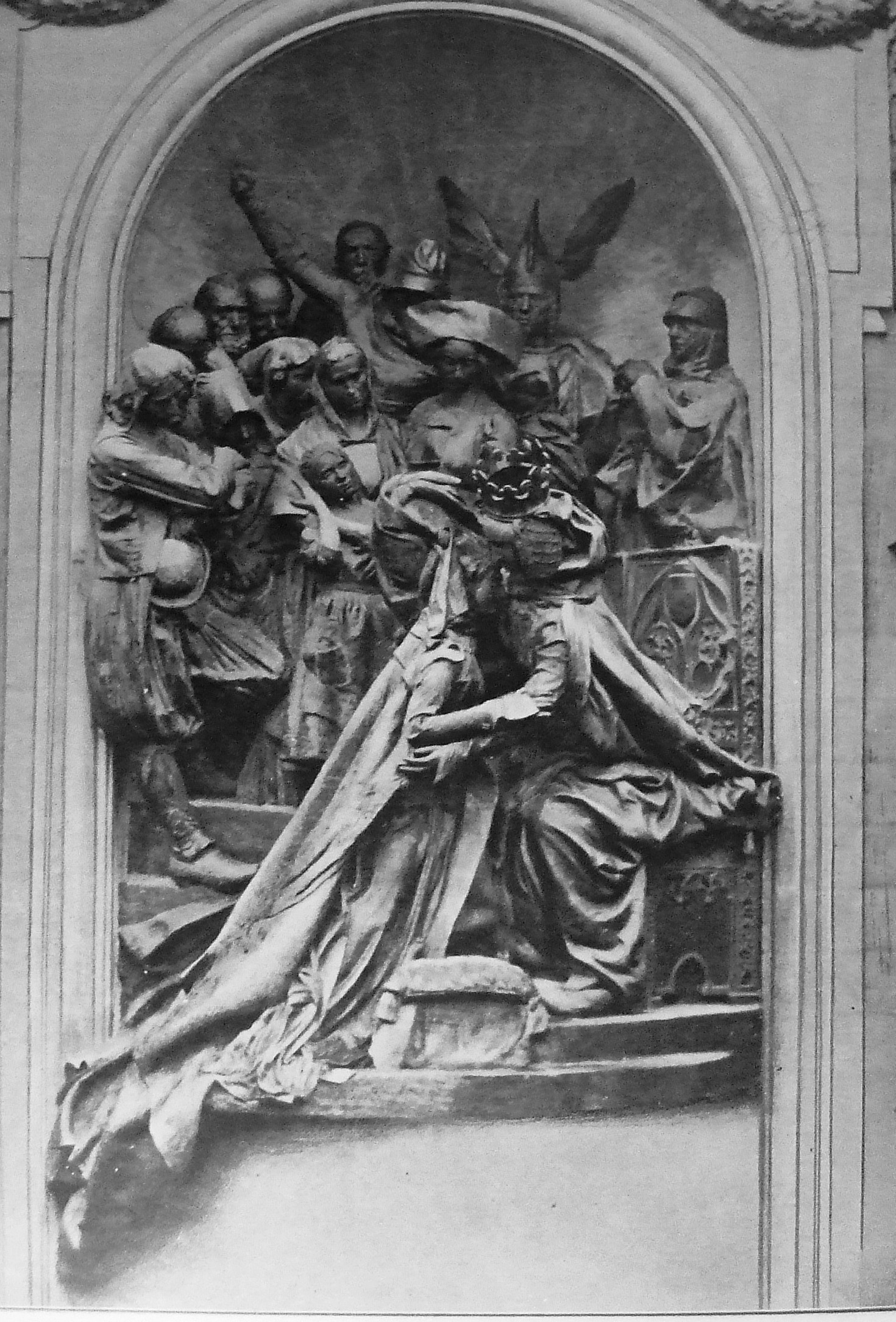
The monument to the Unity of Brittany and France, 1911

The party's first public action took place on October 29, 1911. This was a protest at the official unveiling of the monument to Breton-French unity the Place de l'Hotel de Ville in Rennes. The monument, created by the artist Jean Boucher, depicted Duchess Anne of Brittany rising from a kneeling position before the King of France. During this event Camille Le Mercier d'Erm and André Guillemot were arrested and taken into custody by the local municipal police.

Breiz Dishual ("Free Brittany") was the party's monthly journal, founded in July 1912.

The party ceased to exist in 1914 on the outbreak of World War I. Its journal ceased publication at the same time.

A new nationalist party was founded in 1931 under the slightly different name Breton National Party (Parti national breton). Party activists destroyed Boucher's monument with a bomb in 1932. In 1941, on the thirtieth anniversary of the foundation of the original PNB, the leaders of the new party organised a celebration of it and a tribute to Camille Le Mercier d'Erm.
