= Roparz Hemon =

Breton author and poet (1900–1978)

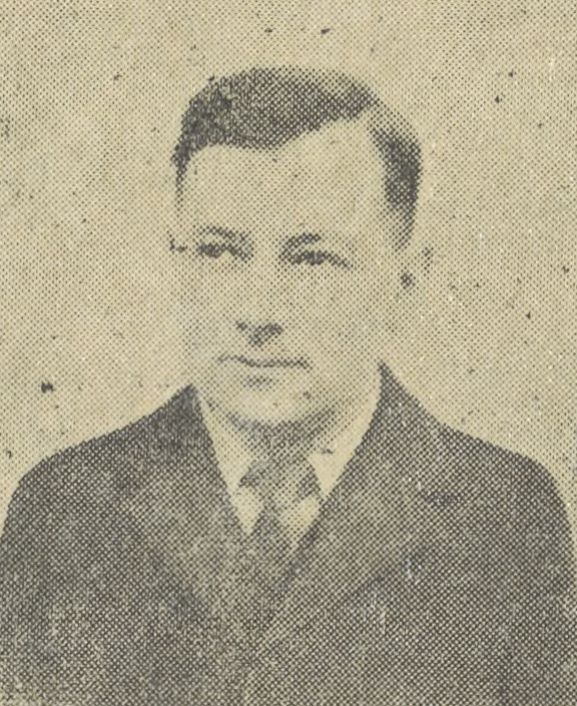
- Born: Louis-Paul Némo; 18 November 1900; Brest, France
- Died: 29 June 1978 (aged 77); Dublin, Ireland
- Other name: Louis Némo
- Occupation: Author
- Known for: Breton dictionary, Breton grammar, Mari Vorgan, Nenn Jani

Louis-Paul Némo (18 November 1900 – 29 June 1978), better known by the pseudonym Roparz Hemon, was a Breton author and scholar of Breton expression. He was the author of numerous dictionaries, grammars, poems and short stories. He also founded Gwalarn, a literary journal in Breton where many young authors published their first writings during the 1920s and 1930s.

== Life and works ==
Surprisingly, Roparz Hemon, who was born as Louis Nemo in Brest, was not a native speaker of the Breton language.

His father, Eugène Nemo, was born illegitimately, but was discreetly provided for by his biological father, and went on to become both a mechanical engineer and an officer in the French Navy. His mother, Julie Foricher, was a girls' school teacher. Although Hemon's Foricher grandparents were native Breton speakers, they had both chosen to speak only French to their children and grandchildren. By the time of Hemon's birth on 18 November 1900, the family was upper middle class.

Despite the religious persecution of the Affaire des Fiches, the Nemo family remained practicing Catholics and attended traditional Breton Pardons, particularly those in Le Folgoët and Locronan. Hemon's sister later recalled that her brother took great delight in hearing the Breton sermons and hymns, which he kept trying to recite afterwards, despite not understanding them.

Hemon served in the French Army at the beginning of the Second World War, where he was wounded and taken prisoner by the Germans.

Back in Brest in August 1940, he took back publishing Gwalarn. In November 1940, he was appointed as director of programmes at Radio Roazhon-Breizh, a Breton language weekly broadcast set up by the Propagandastaffel. From 1941, he directed the weekly publication Arvor. In October 1942, Hemon was appointed by Leo Weisgerber to help found the "Celtic Institute of Brittany". Hemon rendered other services to the Germans, like helping in compiling files against préfet Ripert.

At the Liberation, Hemon fled to Nazi Germany, where he was imprisoned. After one year of jail he was sentenced by the Fourth French Republic to ten years of "dégradation nationale" for the offence of "Indignité nationale". He decided therefore to go in exile to Ireland. He worked there for the Dublin Institute for Advanced Studies. He would never go back to Brittany. Despite all this he never stopped working for the Breton language revival, and wrote for instance A Historical Morphology and Syntax of Breton in 1975. He created the magazine Ar Bed Keltiek that resembled Kannadig Gwalarn or Arvor. He died in 1978 and was buried in Brest.

== Attack on his reputation ==
Hemon's reputation as a scholar led to the naming of institutions in Brittany after him. In 2000 controversy erupted over this, as Hemon's role as a Collaborator during the Occupation was researched and publicised. Some of his statements made at the time were also disinterred, particularly the anti-French opinions expressed in Ni hon unan. As a result, the Breton-medium school, or Diwan in Le Relecq-Kerhuon, and the Cultural centre of Guingamp, which had been named after Hemon, had to change names.
