= Breton National Party =

Former Political party in France

Breton National Party Strollad Broadel Breizh Parti national breton
- Party flag
- Leader: Olier Mordrel
- Founded: 1931
- Dissolved: 1944
- Preceded by: Breton Autonomist Party
- Headquarters: Rennes, France
- Newspaper: L'Heure Bretonne
- Paramilitary wing: Bagadoù stourm
- Ideology: Pan-Celticism; Breton nationalism Fascism; Antisemitism; Collaborationism
- Political position: Far-right
- Colors: Black and white
- Anthem: "Bretoned Sonn" ("Bretonmen Straight")

The Breton National Party (French Parti National Breton, Breton: Strollad Broadel Breizh) was a nationalist party in Brittany that existed from 1931 to 1944. The party was disbanded after the liberation of France in World War II, because of ties to the Third Reich.

== History ==
The PNB was formed in the aftermath of split between federalists and nationalists within the Breton Autonomist Party (PAB), following the Congress of Guingamp in August 1931. Following the collapse of the PAB, the federalists led by Morvan Marchal formed the Breton Federalist League; the nationalist faction, led by Olier Mordrel, decided to found a new party with a clearly nationalist agenda, namely seeking Breton independence from France.

This revived the programme of the previous Breton Nationalist Party, which had existed from 1911-1914. A congress was held in Landerneau on December 27, 1931. The following year, activists led by Célestin Lainé bombed a sculpture in Rennes representing Breton unity with France. The creation of this sculpture had spurred the foundation of the earlier party in 1911.

The party was influenced by international Celticist ideas, and modelled its aspirations on Irish independence movements. It was also closely associated with fascist ideology. Because of its connections with Nazi Germany the party was banned in France on the outbreak of World War II in 1939, but after the defeat of France it was revived, becoming closely associated with Breton collaborationism. During the occupation France the PNB established a paramilitary, Bagadoù stourm, influenced by the SA that adopted a flag similar to that of the Reichskriegsflagge. An explicitly Nazi faction broke away in 1941 under the name Breton Social-National Workers' Movement.

During its existence, the PNB published a newspaper, L'Heure Bretonne.

== Literature ==
- Daniel Leach "'A sense of Nordism’: The impact of Germanic assistance upon the militant interwar Breton nationalist movement", in: European Review of History, Vol. 17 (2010), No. 4, pp. 629–646.

== See also ==
- Breton nationalism and World War II
- History of far-right movements in France
