= Breton nationalism =

Regional nationalism associated with the region of Brittany in France

Flag of Brittany

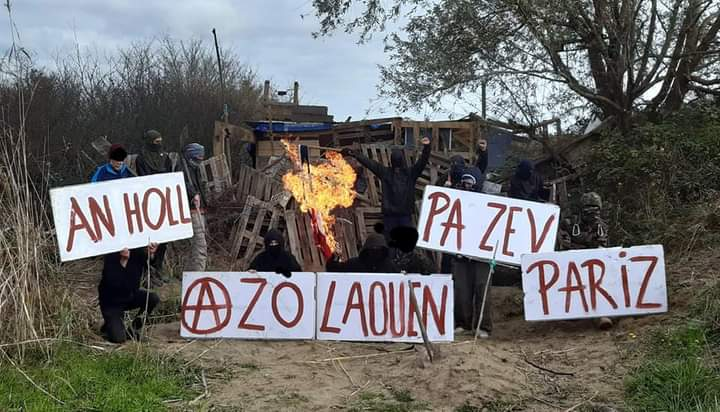
Photo of activists burning the French flag and holding signs reading "everyone is happy when Paris burns".

Nationalism in the historical province of Brittany, France includes political, historical, and cultural aspects. Brittany is considered to be one of the six Celtic nations (along with Cornwall, Ireland, the Isle of Man, Scotland and Wales).

Breton nationalism was a political current that appeared in the 1920s in the second Emsav, and claiming Brittany's independence.

The political aspirations of Breton nationalists include the desire to obtain the right to self-rule, whether within France or independently of it, and to acquire more power in the European Union, United Nations and other international institutions.

Breton cultural nationalism includes an important linguistic component, with Breton and Gallo speakers seeking equality with the French language in the region. Cultural nationalists seek to reinvigorate Breton music, traditions, and symbols and forging strength links with other Celtic nations.

The French position includes a range of views, from allowing Brittany a devolved government to curbing wishes for independence.

Contemporary political parties or movements holding Breton nationalist views are the Breton Democratic Union, the Breton Party, Emgann, Adsav and Breizhistance.

== Positioning within the Breton movement ==
The academic Michel Nicolas describes this political tendency of the Breton movement as "a doctrine putting forward the nation, in the state and non-state framework". According to him, the people belonging to this tendency can choose to present themselves as separatists or independentists, that is to say claiming the right of "any nation to a state, and if necessary must be able to separate to create one".

He thus opposes it to regionalism which aims for an administrative redeployment granting autonomy at the regional level, and at the Breton federalism, which seeks it to set up a federal organization of the territory.

== History ==
=== Beginnings in the early 1910s ===
==== D'Ar Bobl to the Breton nationalist party ====
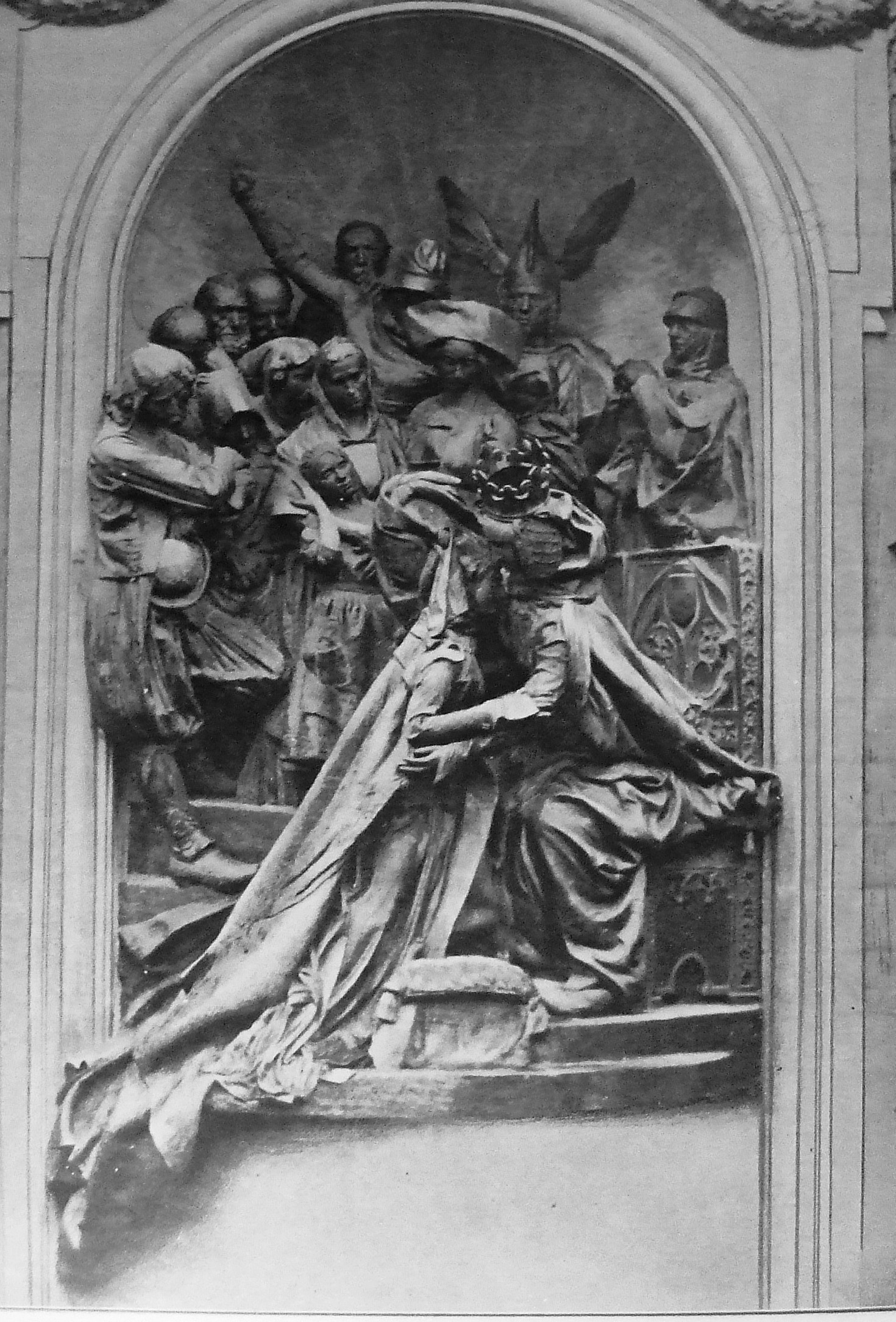
The work of Jean Boucher to the origin of the creation of the nationalist current.

Several authors, cultural groups, or regionalist political groups use the expression of "Breton nation" as from 19th century but without this one falls under nationalist dimension. It is only at the beginning of the 20th century that a nationalist current in Brittany began to be constituted. Imitating the French nationalism of the time, they focused their speech on the defense of Breton language and valorization of the history of Brittany; however, the Breton Nationalist movement distinguished itself by seeking to legitimize its actions by comparing themselves with those of other European minorities, "Celts" in particular, like those of Wales and especially of Ireland.

By the end of the 1900s, the journal Ar Bobl of Frañsez Jaffrennou began to spread ideas close to this ideology, but 1911 is a key date for this current. The inauguration of a work by Jean Boucher in a niche of the City Hall of Rennes, which showed the Duchess Anne of Brittany kneeling before the King of France Charles VIII, caused an opposition movement in the regionalist movements. An activist, Camille Le Mercier d'Erm, disrupted the inauguration, and used her trial as a platform. This is the first public expression of Breton nationalism. Following this event, a group of students Rennes founded the Breton Nationalist Party, which began with several members of the Regionalist Federation of Brittany, with the aim of breaking with the regionalist ideas of this group. Among its first members were Loeiz Napoleon ar Rouz, Aogust Bôcher, Pol Suliac, Joseph du Chauchix, Joseph Le Bras, Job Loyant, but their numbers hardly go beyond the 13 members of the editorial board of Breiz Dishual.

==== First strategic positioning ====
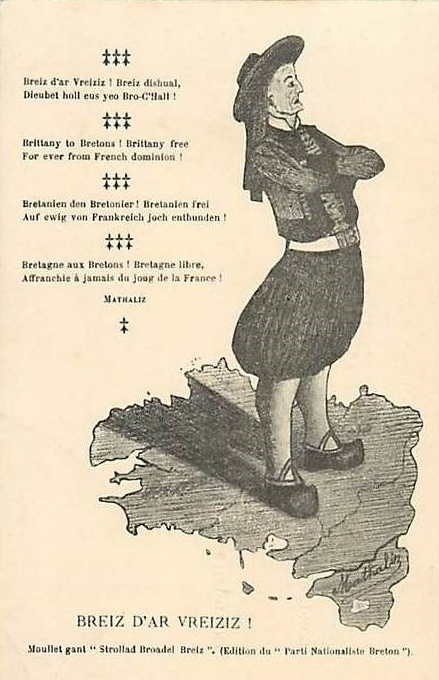
1912 poster of the Breton Nationalist Party claiming a "free Brittany, forever free from the yoke of France".

The group is at odds with Breton regionalism, which it accused of ratifying a foreign influence, that of France, in Brittany. Seeking to apply the principle of subsidiarity, that is claiming a decentralization with a redistribution of powers, would be equivalent, according to the nationalists, to legitimizing a French domination. They oppose as much to monarchists (in particular by maintaining controversy with the members of the French Action), than to the Republicans by targeting "black hussars of the republic", accused of pursuing a policy of linguistic repression. In 1912, Breiz Dishual, the newspaper of the BNP, thus formulates for the first time this opposition towards the royalists and the republicans with the expression na ru na gwenn, Breizhad hepken , ("neither red nor white, Breton only"), Picked up in the following decades by different trends. The nationalists thus refused to support certain circles such as the landed aristocracy or the urban bourgeoisie, considered to be compromised. It is also within this first group that the first Federalist ideas appear from April 1914 in Breiz Dishual.

This current is also positioned face to face with events and international actors, especially in the Pan-Celtic current. Breiz Dishual, indicates from its first issue of July 1912 to want to take an example of the Irish nationalists methods. This comparison between the Breton and Irish situations of the time is not peculiar to the Breton nationalist movement, and is also found among outside observers, such as Simon Südfeld for the liberal German newspaper Vossische Zeitung in 1913. The Breton Nationalist Party as its newspaper Breiz Dishual, however, have only limited echoes in the Breton movement of the time, and his nationalism can only find a weak resonance. One of its founders, Loeiz-Napoleon Ar Rouz, will play a role later to make the link between Breton nationalist currents and Irish. It is also inspired by other European examples such as Hungary, Catalonia, Norway, Balkan States, and inscribes its reflection on a European scale.

=== Dynamism of the 1920s ===
==== Breton regional group at the Unvaniez Yaouankiz Vreiz ====
After the World War I, the nationalist current continued its existence, becoming one of the most dynamic components of the Breton movement in the 1920s. The Breton Regionalist Group is the first party created (September 1918) taking up this ideology, mixing elders of the Breton Nationalist Party as Kamil Ar Merser 'Erm, and newcomers like Olier Mordrel, Frañsez Debauvais, Yann Bricler, and Morvan Marchal; it is endowed as soon as January 1919 of a newspaper, Breiz Atao, to spread their ideas. The adjective "regionalist" is preferred to that of "nationalist", firstly because the French State of the time tolerates little separatist ideas, and secondly because it makes it possible to forge links with the Breton bourgeoisie of the Regionalist Federation of Brittany.

The ideology of the group was initially and partially in a "Maurrasian movement", but then quickly moved in towards nationalism. The Breton Regionalist Group took the name of Unvaniez Yaouankiz Vreiz in May 1920, whose status indicates that it aims at a "return to independent national life". Its newspaper Breiz Atao also evolved by taking as subtitle "monthly magazine of Breton nationalism" in January 1921, then that of "the Breton nation" in July of the same year.

==== Attempt, from Breton regionalism, to Alsatian autonomy, to Irish nationalism ====
The nationalists aimed at first not to support the Breton population but their economic output. They intended to become the intellectual leaders, the new elite of the region. Frañsez Debauvais cited René Johannet to this effect in the Breiz Atao of April 1921. They continued to compete with the regionalism of the Regionalist Federation of Brittany, and the relations between the two groups were strained. Antagonism increased in 1920 when the BRF declared the creation of a large western region encompassing Poitou, Anjou, Maine, Cotentin and Brittany, provoking a unanimous rejection from other regionalist groups and nationalists. From then on, the nationalists' discourse became profoundly anti-regionalist, accusing them of falling into "biniousery" and "bretonnerie".

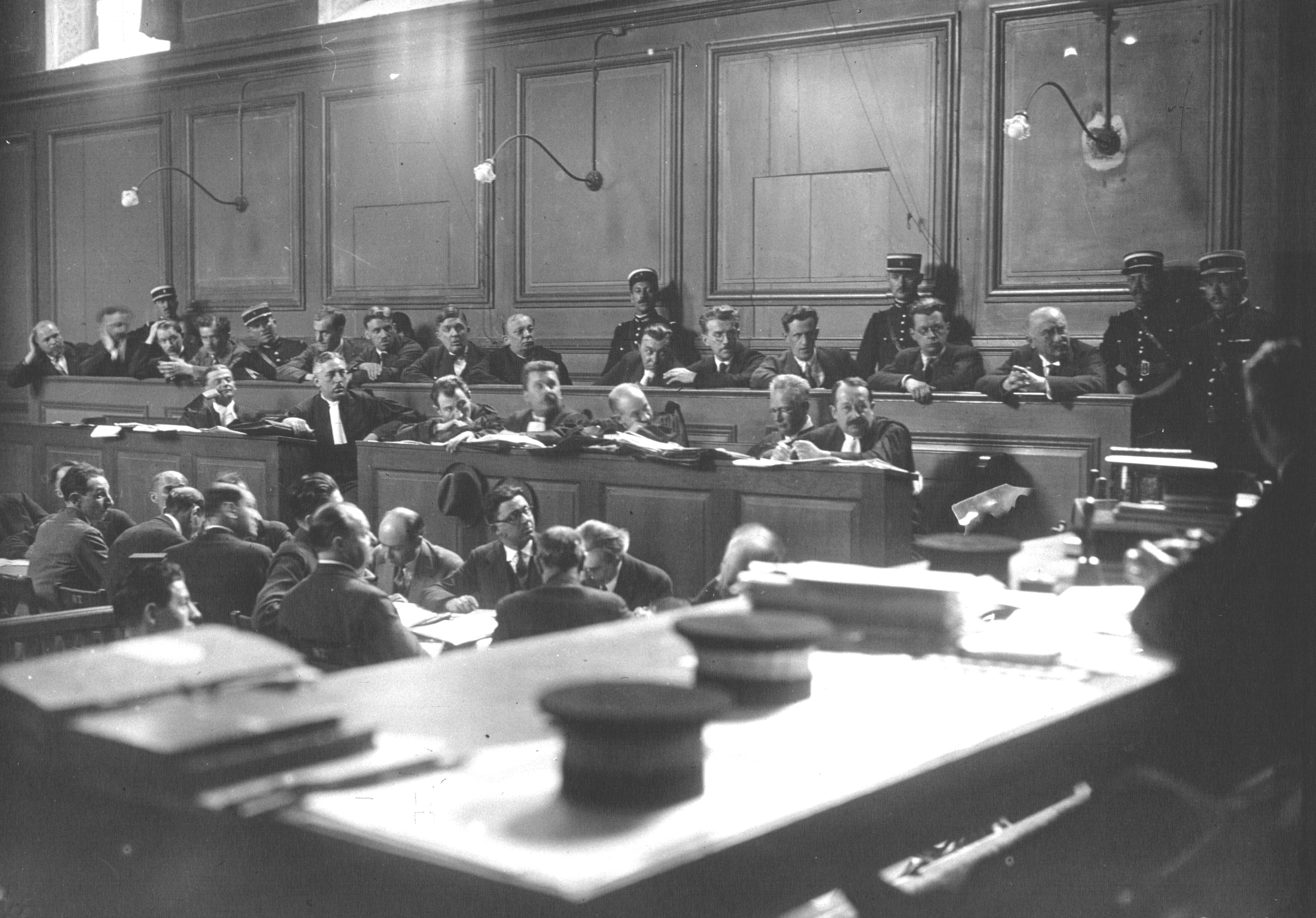
The trial of the Alsatian autonomists in 1928 provided an example for Breton nationalists.

The nationalists also sought to escape the French political binaries of the time, left and right, and take up the slogan "na ru na gwenn, Breiziz hepken" previously used by the first nationalists. This positioning was reinforced by the fact that no French political party paid attention to the demands expressed by the regionalist groups. They also sought to emancipate themselves from the Catholic Church and the clerical milieus. Instead, they claimed a Celtic heritage and that the Catholic religion alienating them from their identity as Bretons. The Alsatian affair in 1926, during which the Cartel des Gauches tried to return to the Concordat in Alsace-Moselle, caused autonomist agitation in this region, and the Breton nationalists were inspired by this example to form a political party.

== Opinion polling ==
According to an opinion poll conducted in 2013, 18% of Bretons support Breton independence. The poll also found that 37% would describe themselves as Breton first, while 48% would describe themselves as French first.

== See also ==
- Bleimor (Scouting)
- Bonnets Rouges
- Breton nationalism and World War II
