= Dol Cathedral =

Roman Catholic church located in Dol-de-Bretagne

Coordinates: 48°33′3″N 1°45′21″W

Dol Cathedral Cathédrale Saint-Samson de Dol
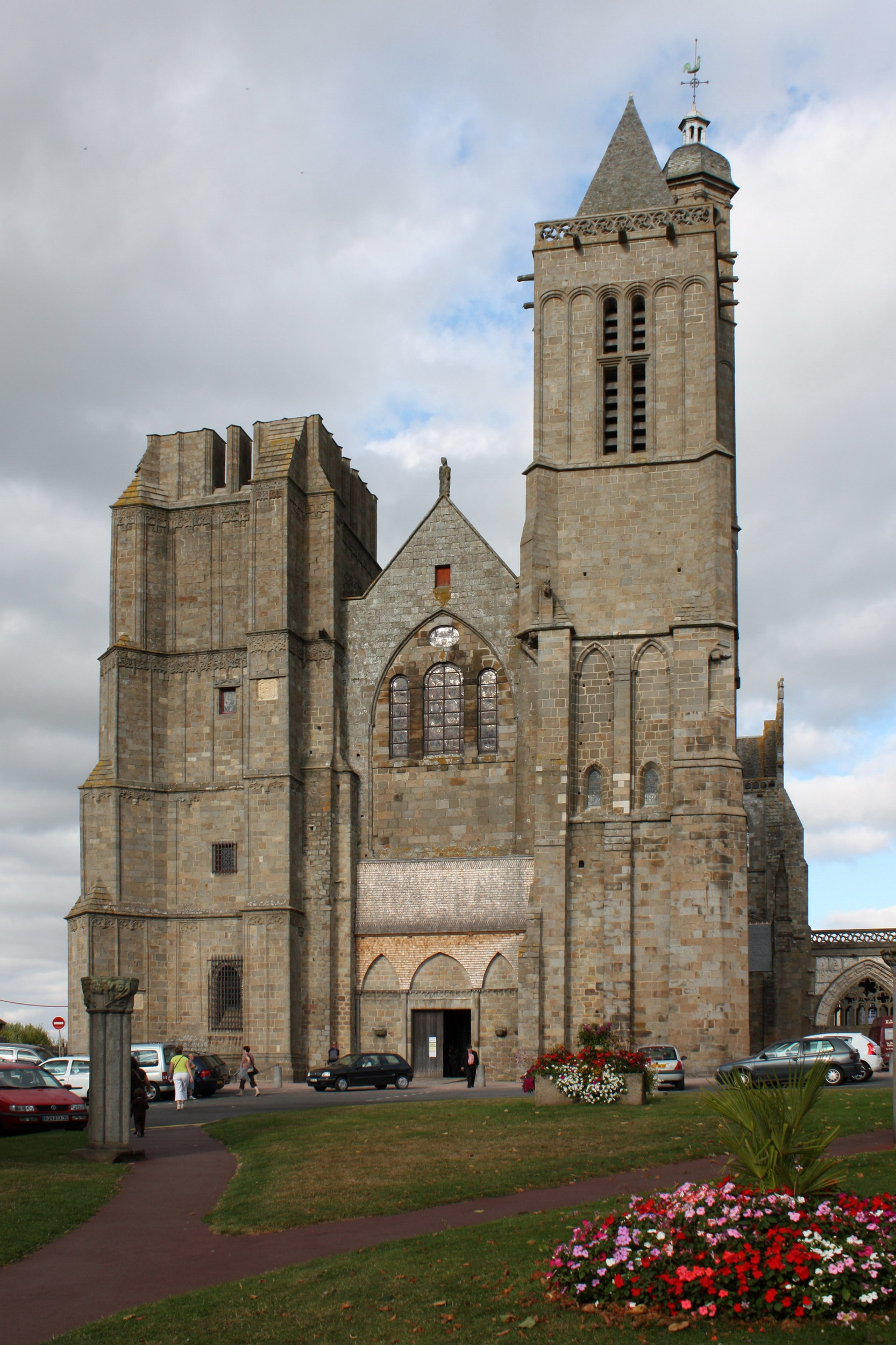
- Dol Cathedral

Religion
- Affiliation: Roman Catholic Church
- Region: Ille-et-Vilaine
- Rite: Roman
- Ecclesiastical or organisational status: Cathedral
- Status: Active

Location
- Location: Dol-de-Bretagne, France
- Interactive map of Dol Cathedral; Cathédrale Saint-Samson de Dol
- Territory: Bishopric of Dol

Architecture
- Type: church
- Groundbreaking: 13th century
- Completed: 18th century

Dol-de-Bretagne Cathedral (French: Cathédrale Saint-Samson de Dol) is a Roman Catholic church located in Dol-de-Bretagne. The cathedral is dedicated to Saint Samson, one of the seven founding saints of Brittany. It was formerly the seat of the Archbishop of Dol, one of the nine ancient bishoprics of Brittany. The cathedral suffered badly from the excesses of the French Revolution, becoming successively a "Temple de la Raison", then a stable, then a warehouse. Revolutionaries caused considerable damage and many treasures were lost. When it eventually returned to being a house of worship, its role as a bishopric was abolished by the Concordat of 1801 when the Dol diocese was merged into the Dioceses of Rennes and Saint-Malo. The Concordat of 1801 was an agreement between Napoleon and Pope Pius VII, signed on 15 July 1801 in Paris, which sought national reconciliation between revolutionaries and Catholics. The Concordat was abrogated by the law of 1905 on the separation of church and state.

The building is notable for its eclectic mix of styles and idiosyncrasies, such as the incomplete north tower on the main west-facing entrance. The tower was begun in 1520 but never finished due to lack of funds. A local myth has it that the top was knocked off by the devil, who threw the nearby Dol-de-Bretagne menhir at the building.

The current cathedral dates to the 13th century and is primarily Gothic in style with both Norman and English influences. It was built on the site of an old church where Nominoë was crowned as the first king of Brittany in 850. This old church was replaced by a Romanesque style cathedral which was in turn destroyed in 1203 by the soldiers of King John and little is left of that building today. The cathedral has retained little of the old furnishings as in 1742 the cathedral chapter decided to get rid of all the old bishop's tombs and relaid the choir paving and in 1793 the rood screen which had separated the choir from the nave was demolished and was replaced by an iron grill on the orders of the zealots of the revolution.

Samson was born in Wales at the end of the 5th century. He became a monk and was the superior of a monastery in Caldey. He moved to Ireland and in around 548 made the journey to Armorica with several colleagues and founded a monastery there. Later, with the support of the Breton king Judicael, he played a key role in the foundation of the city of Dol and its bishopric. He died in 565 in Dol having nominated Magloire as his successor and his tomb was to become the destination of numerous pilgrims and is included in the Breton Tro Breizh. One of the stained glass window frames in the cathedral depicts Samson sailing for Armorica ("Saint Samson fait voile vers l'Armorique").

From Saint Samson in the 6th century to Monseigneur de Hercé, shot at Vannes in 1795, more than 80 bishops have occupied the bishopric of Dol. Since 1880 the Archbishop of Rennes is the Archbishop of Rennes, Dol and Saint-Malo.

== Landmarks in the cathedral's history ==
In 548 Samson arrived in Dol from Wales and founded a monastery there; In 555 Judicael, the Breton king, directed that the monastery be regarded as a bishopric.

After the coronation of Nominoë, the Breton ruler in 848, he promoted the bishop to archbishop and the city became the religious capital of Brittany ("la Métropole ecclésiastique de la Bretagne") and soon a cathedral replaced the existing church. This was destroyed by the Vikings in 1014. A Romanesque cathedral was then built. In the middle of the eleventh century there was a dispute between Pope Gregory VII and the kings of France supported by the Archbishop of Tours over Dol-de-Bretagne filling the role of a bishopric and in 1199 the bishopric was withdrawn and jurisdiction was returned to the Archbishop of Tours. Nominoë's actions were effectively reversed.

William the Conqueror laid siege to Dol on three occasions. In 1065, William the Conqueror was in conflict with Conan II who had succeeded Alain III and laid siege to Dol. This siege is depicted in part of the Bayeux Tapestry. A second siege took place in 1076 and lasted 40 days until the intervention of King Philippe Ist. A third siege is said to have taken place in 1086.

In 1203, the English king, John Lackland, known in France as "Jean sans Terre" and the presumed murderer of Arthur de Bretagne burned the Romanesque cathedral down and occupied Dol for one year; there are few remnants of that building. Then, fearing for his soul and in a fit of remorse, he put up funds towards the cathedral's reconstruction which was started the same year under the episcopacy of the bishop Jean VII de Lizaunet. In a small corner of the south tower, there is a carving depicting "Jean sans Terre" bearing a rictus grin. He was certainly no friend of the people of Dol.

By 1223, the nave had been completed and subsequently, the relics of Saint Samson were brought back to the cathedral from Normandy to where they had been taken for reasons of security. The nave has seven crossings and the classical gothic elevation of arcades, triforium and high windows with a walkway beneath them. De Lizaunet's successor Clément de Vitré (known as Clément de Coetquen or de Coetquin) saw to the construction of the transept and the choir. The choir has five crossings and ten side chapels and terminates with a rectangular chevet. The presence of the relics of Saint Samson attracted pilgrims and this necessitated the addition of an ambulatory. The choir, ambulatory and ten side chapels around the ambulatory were completed by 1279. The cathedral was now functional although it's Gothic towers had still to be constructed.

The porches on the south side of the cathedral were added in the 14th and 15th century. At around this time, the chapter-house and treasury were also added.

Stendhal described the cathedral as "un des ouvrages les plus remarquables que l'architecture gothique puisse offrir à notre admiration".

== The cathedral exterior ==
=== Some images of the cathedral exterior ===
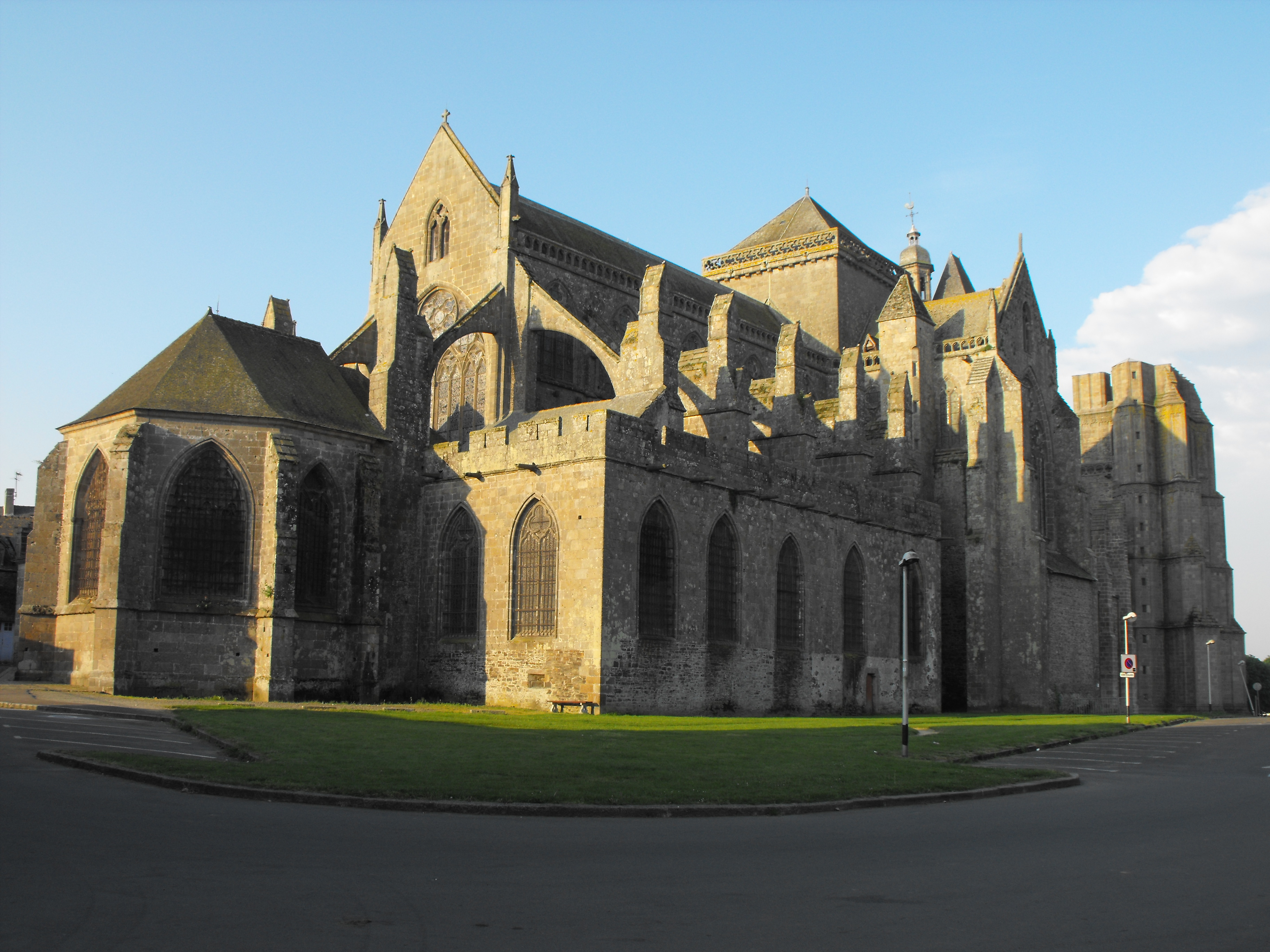
View of the chevet of the Cathédrale Saint-Samson de Dol-de-Bretagne. Note the apsidal chapel

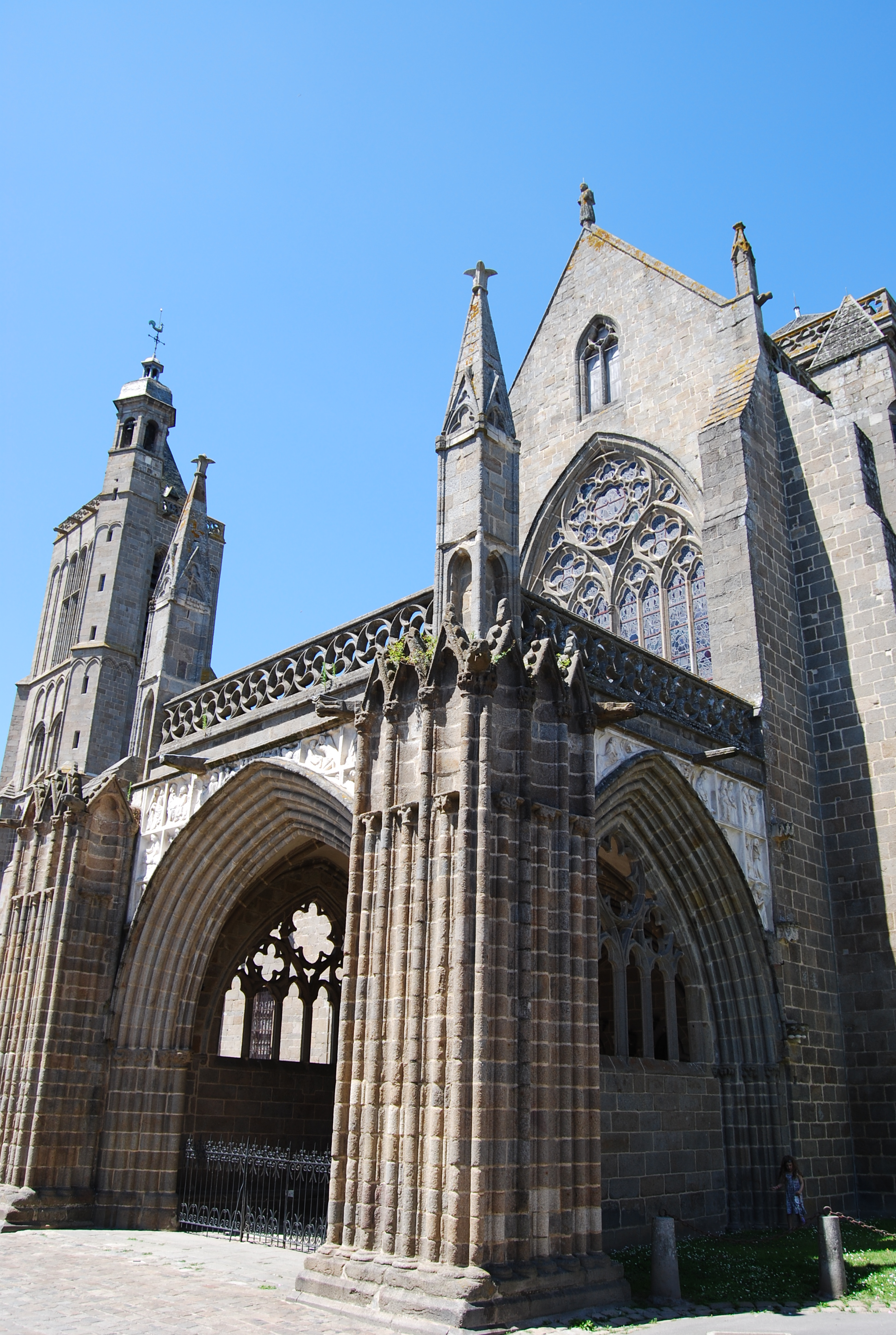
The cathedral's "grand porche".

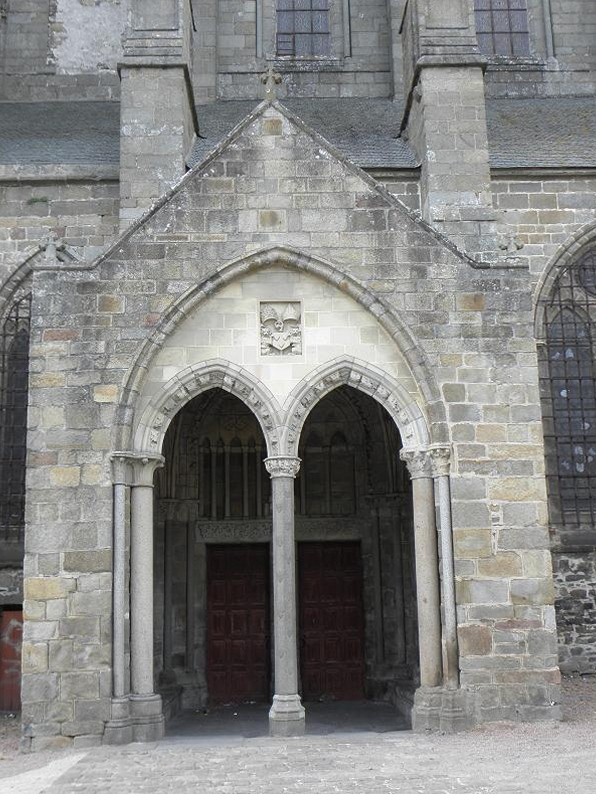
The cathedral's "petit porche".

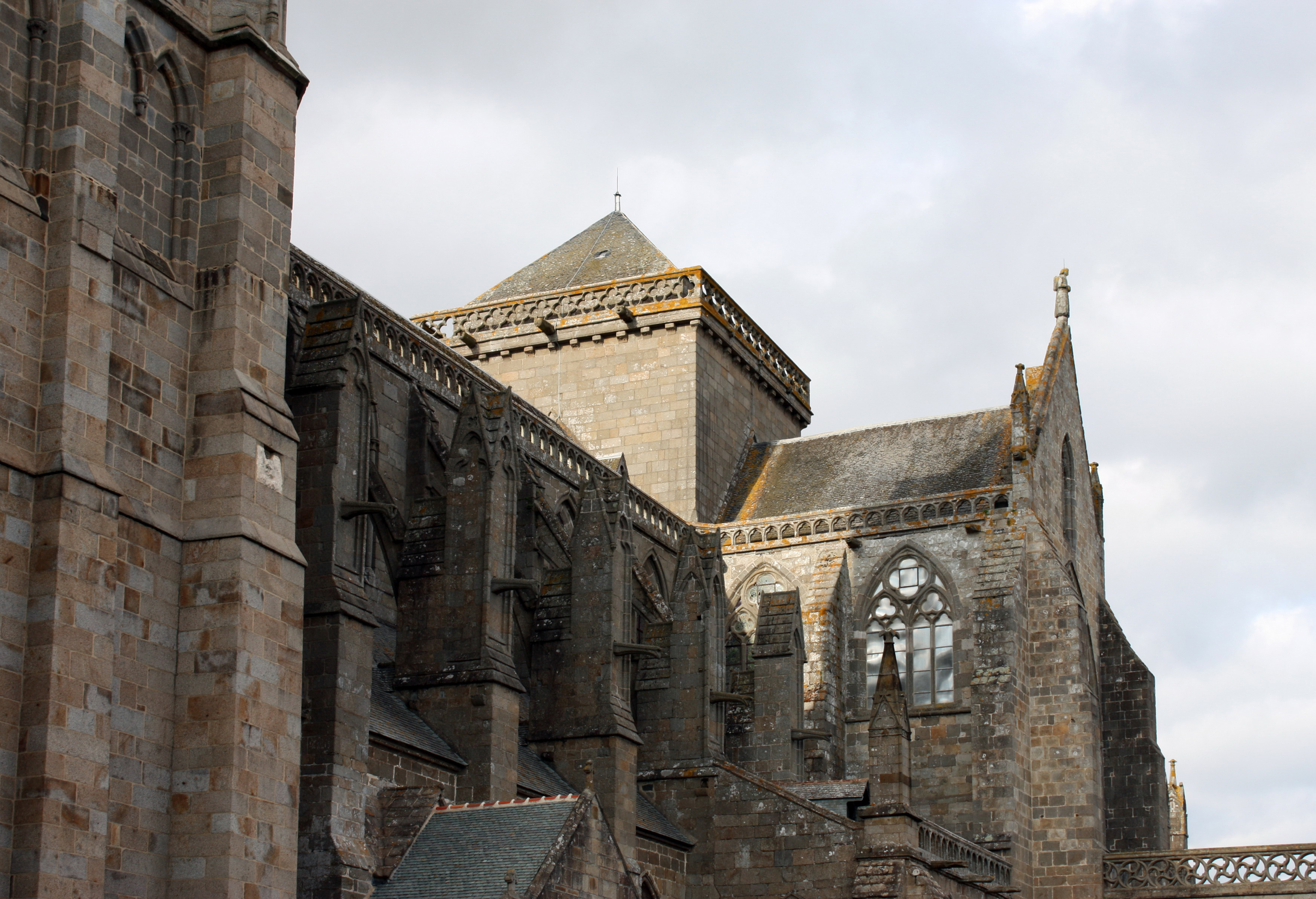
The tower rising from the cathedral crossing

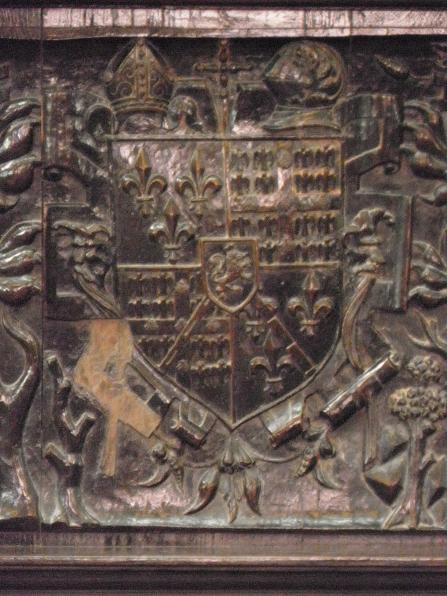
The coat of arms of Monseigneur François de Laval in Dol's Cathédrale Saint-Samson.

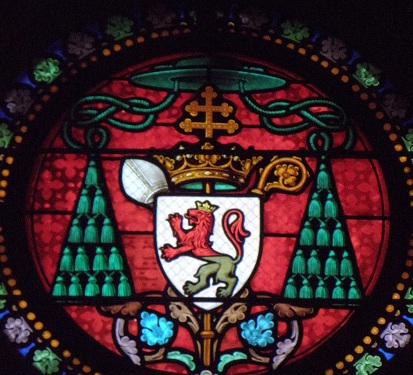
The coat of arms of Monseigneur Charles d'Espinay, Bishop of Dol from 1558 to 1591. Located in the north side of the nave of the Cathédrale Saint-Samson.

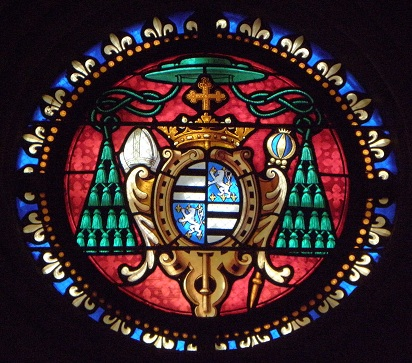
The coat of arms of Monseigneur Jean-Louis de Bouschet de Sourches. Bishop of Dol from 1715 to 1748. Also located in the north nave of the Cathédrale Saint-Samson.

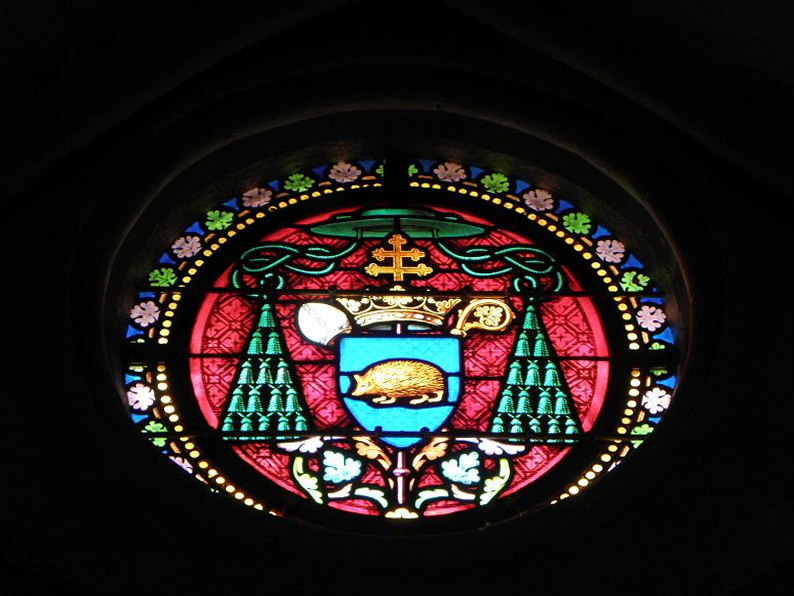
The coat of arms of Monseigneur Jean-François Dondel, Bishop of Dol from 1749 to 1767. Also located in the north nave of the Cathédrale Saint-Samson.

=== The Western façade ===
An architrave with a leaf pattern extends across the entire width of the façade. The gable is surmounted by the statue of a bishop.

=== The Northern façade ===
The side-chapels of the choir are surmounted by a crenellated parapet with arrow-slits giving the cathedral the look of a fortress.

== Dimensions ==
- Exterior length: 93.50m
- Nave length: 39.25m
- Width of nave : 17.05m
- Height below the vault of the nave: 20.20m
- Transept : 8.80m by 8.35m
- Length of the arms of the transept : 9.85m
- Length of choir: 27.55m
- Width of choir : 8.65m
- Height of the vault of choir: 20.50m
- Depth of choir with ambulatory: 31.80m
- Width of choir and sides: 18.35m
- Total width of choir with side chapels 26.05m

== Porches ==
The cathedral has two porches.

=== The West Porch or Great Porch ===
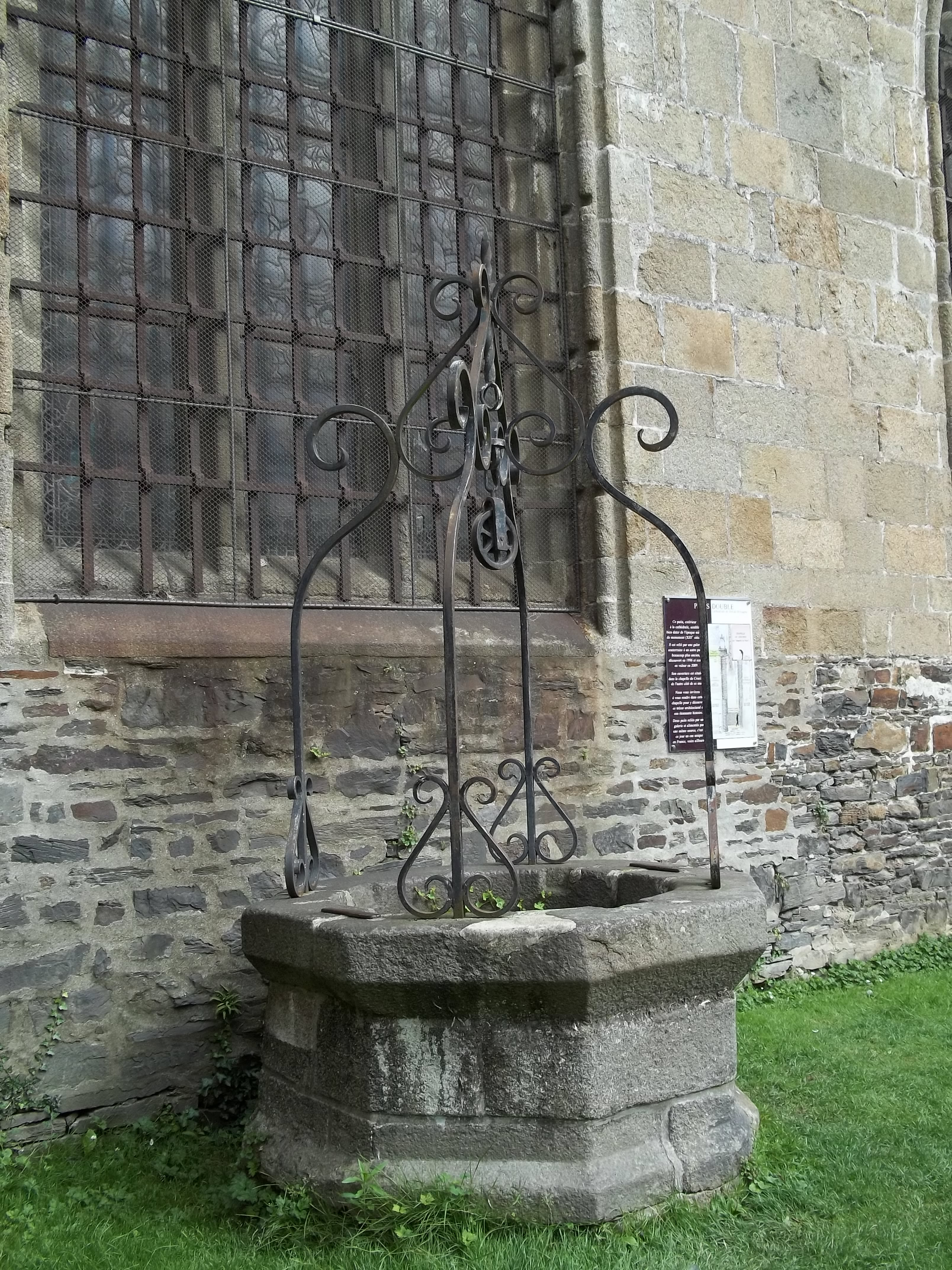
The outside well is connected to the inside well, both are feed by one unique source.

Situated between the cathedral's two towers, the large rectangular west porch is a remnant of the earlier Romanesque cathedral. In the 15th century Bishop Coeuret had the vaulting erected on intersecting ogival arches. The trefoiled doors within the porch give access to the cathedral. The measurements of the porch are 6 metres 20 by 7 metres 60. The keystone on the porch's vaulting bears the Coeuret coat of arms.

The cathedral's "Grand Porch", also known as the "Chapitret" or the "Porche Saint-Magloire", consists of three arcades decorated with 38 bas-reliefs and 132 statuettes in white stone by the Prix de Rome winner Jean Boucher (artist). The doorway itself is made from granite and dates to the 14th century.

The central arcade shows scenes from the life of Christ: The Calvary; Jesus healing a sick man; Jesus amongst the lawyers; the agony in the garden of Gethsemane; Mater Dolorosa (Our Lady of Sorrows); Simon of Cyrene; the Adoring Angels; the "Sainte-Face" (the face of Christ) and Adam and Eve (A copy of the bas-relief at Notre-Dame de Paris)

The east facing arcade by the well shows scenes from the life of the Virgin Mary: Mary carrying the baby Jesus; the flight into Egypt; the coronation; the Visitation; the Annunciation; the Nativity and the Annunciation to the shepherds.

The west facing arcade shows scenes from the history of Bretagne: the death of Saint Samson; the calling of Judicael; the arrest of Sainte-Catherine; Charity; the blessing of Nominoe as he departs for the crusades; a Dol saint receiving a visit from several people one of whom carries a plea to the king; the martyrdom of Sainte Catherine and the good and the bad rich man.

Here are some images of Boucher's magnificent carvings.

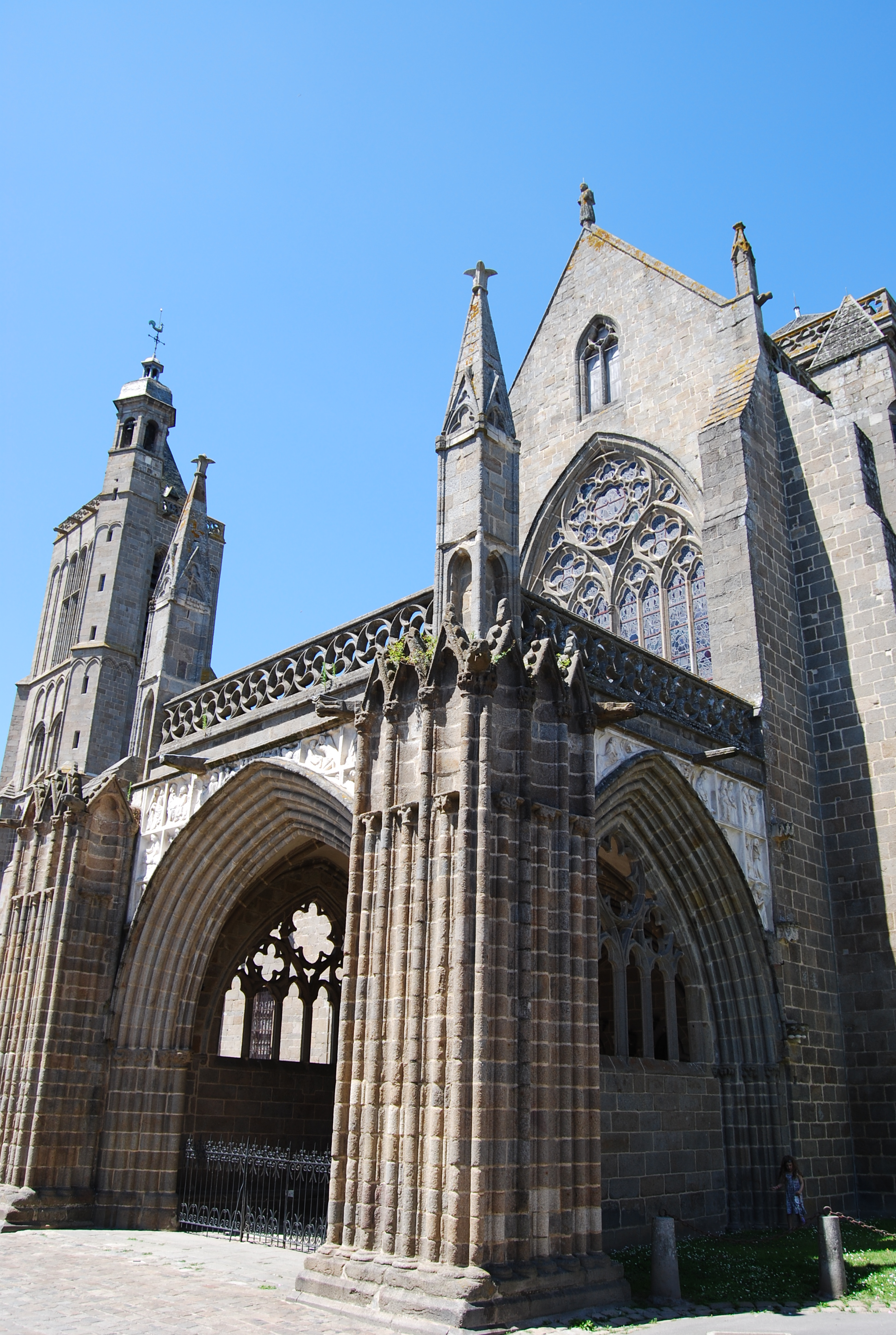
View of the Grand Porch showing the three arcades.

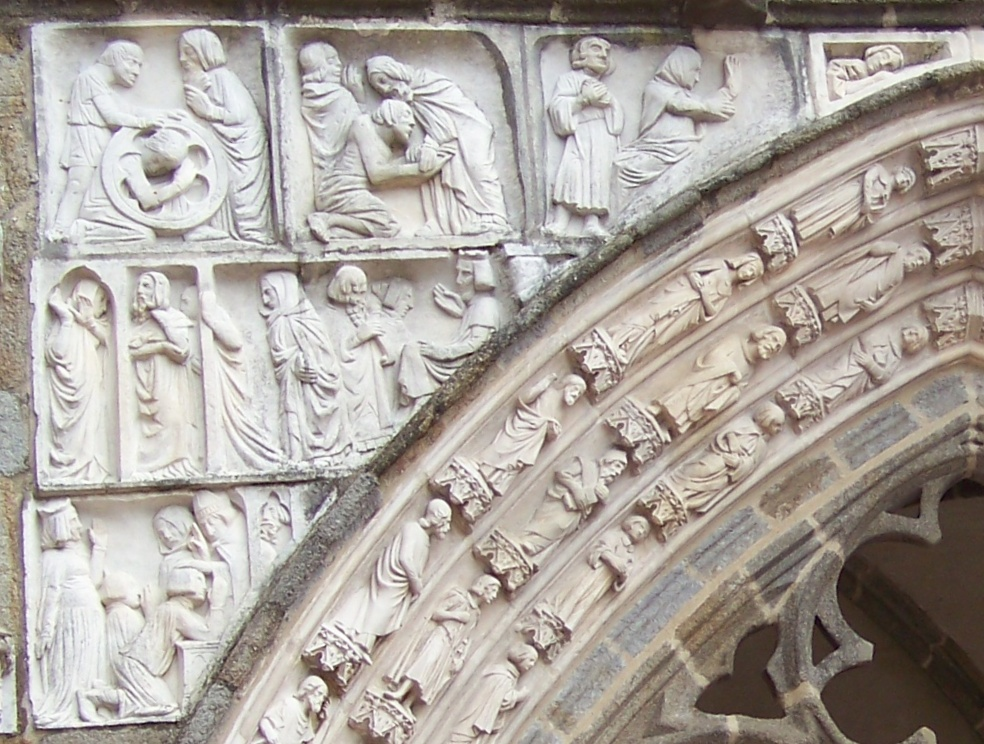
Part of the Grand Porch showing Boucher's reliefs and statuettes in rows of three

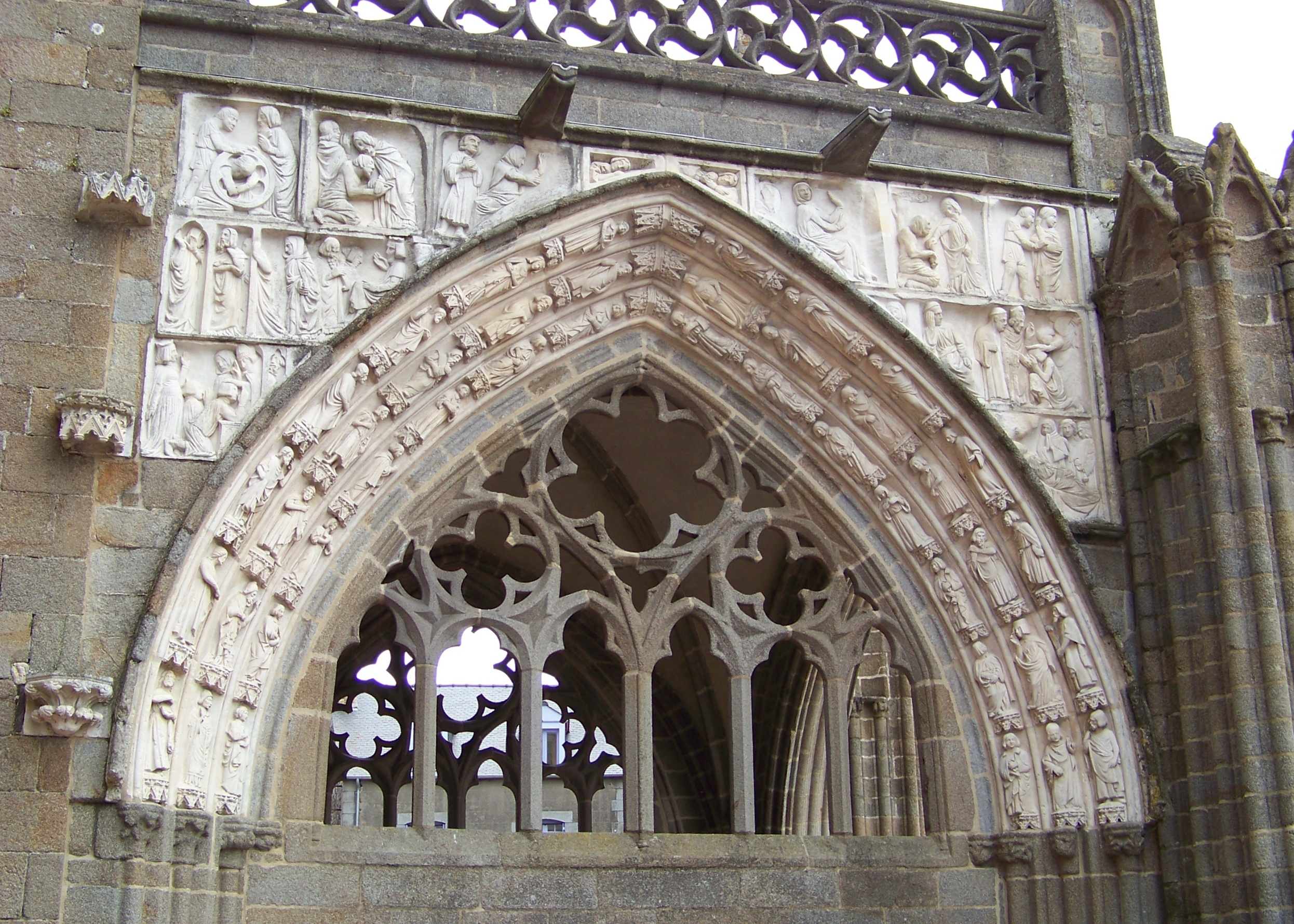
The Grand Porch with Boucher's reliefs and statuettes.

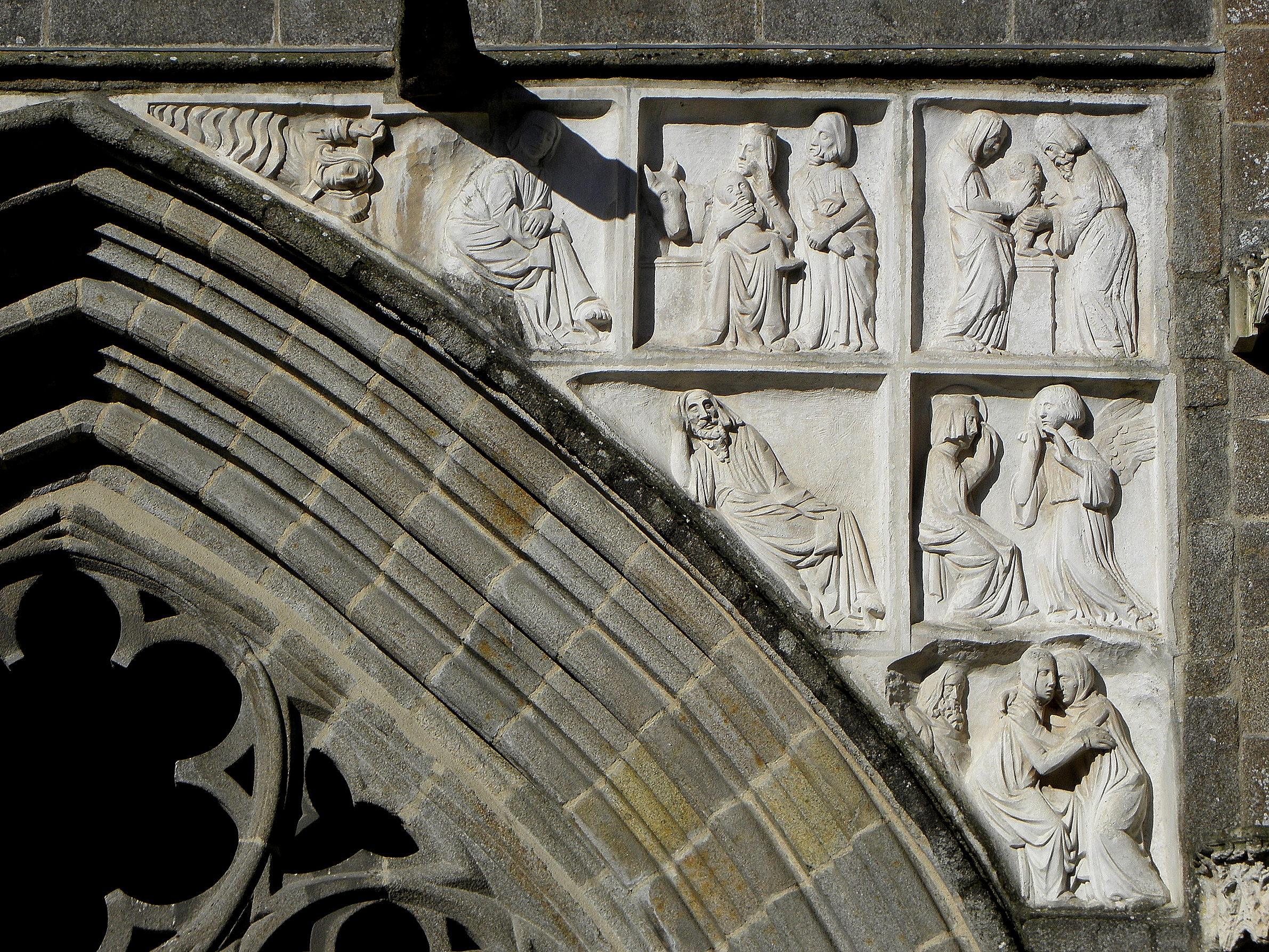
The east facing arcade

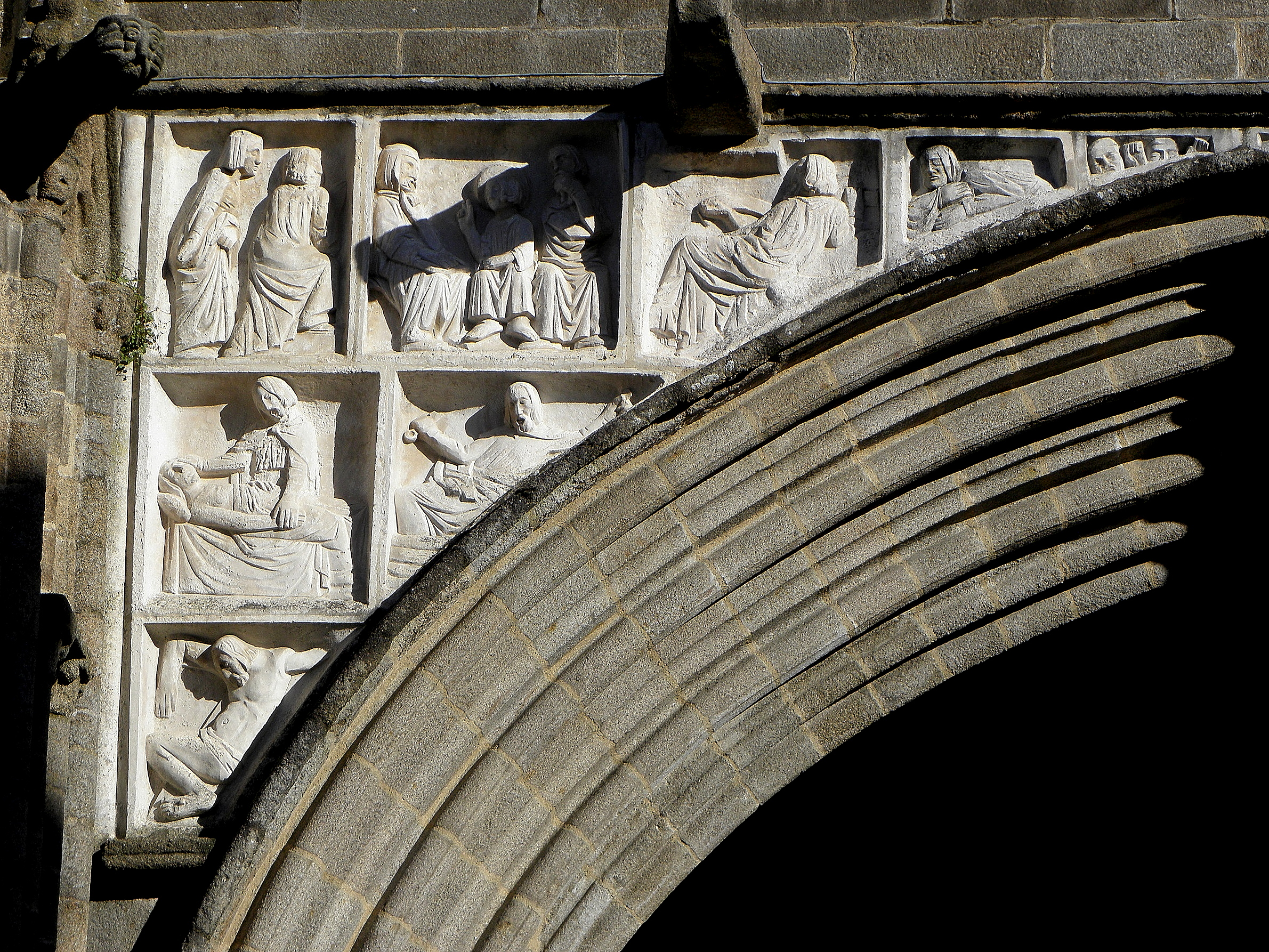
The south facing arcade

Etienne Nicol described Boucher's carvings "Dignes de la grande tradition des imagiers en granite du moyen age".

=== Le petit porche known as the "Porche de l’évêque ===
The south facade contains a small porch first built in the 13th century and known as the Bishop's porch as it allowed the bishop private entrance. This was replaced by a much grander porch in the 15th century which was decorated at the end of the 19th century with biblical relief carvings by the sculptor Jean Boucher including the tree of Jesse (Arbre de Jessé). A coat of arms in the tympanum depicts three hearts and is the arms of bishop Cœuret (1405-1429) who instigated the 15th-century replacement. The porch has a triangular pediment with two ogival arcades resting on colonnettes. The interior is decorated with ogival arcades, rose windows and white stone carved with foliage. The porch measures 3 metres 70 by 3 metres 20.

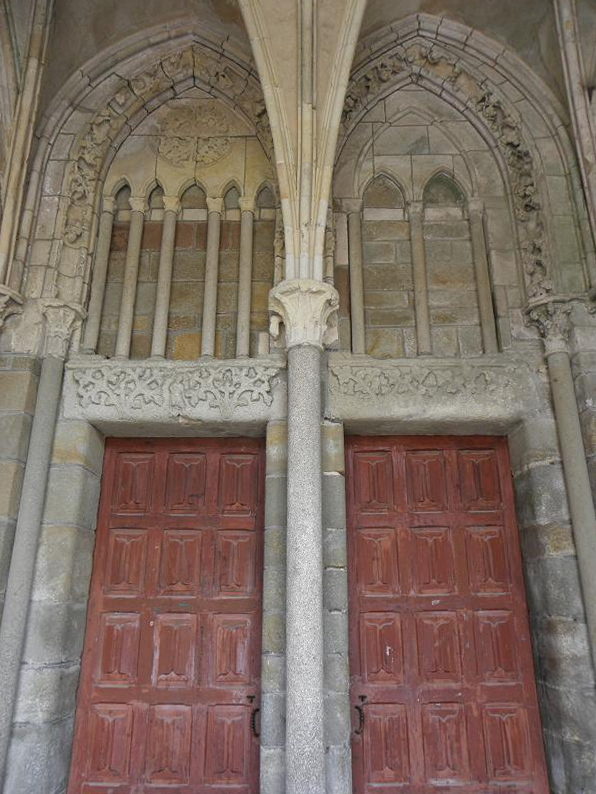
The two doors inside the "Porche de l’évêque" giving access to the cathedral

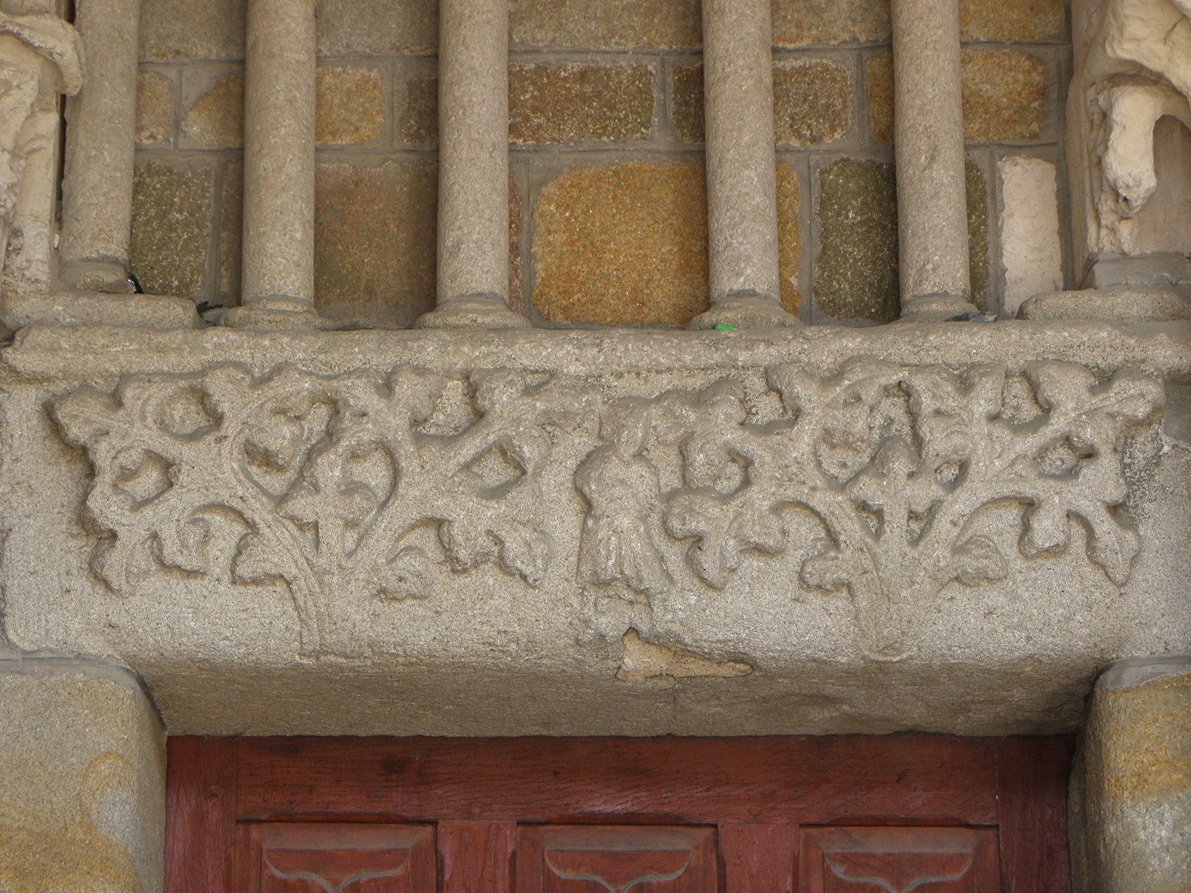
The carved frieze above the doors within the "Porche de l’évêque"

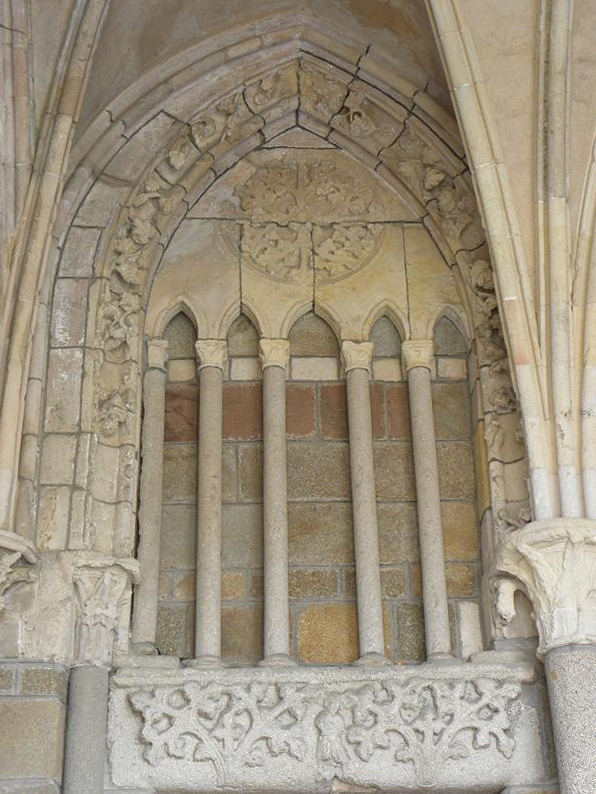
Part of the "Porche de l’évêque"

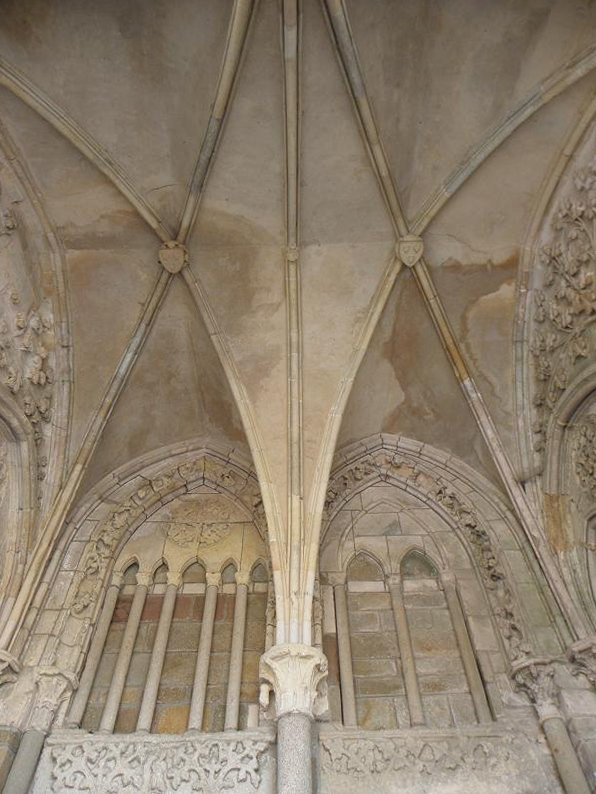
The vaulting in the "Porche de l’évêque"

== The cathedral towers ==
The cathedral has two towers.

=== The north tower ===
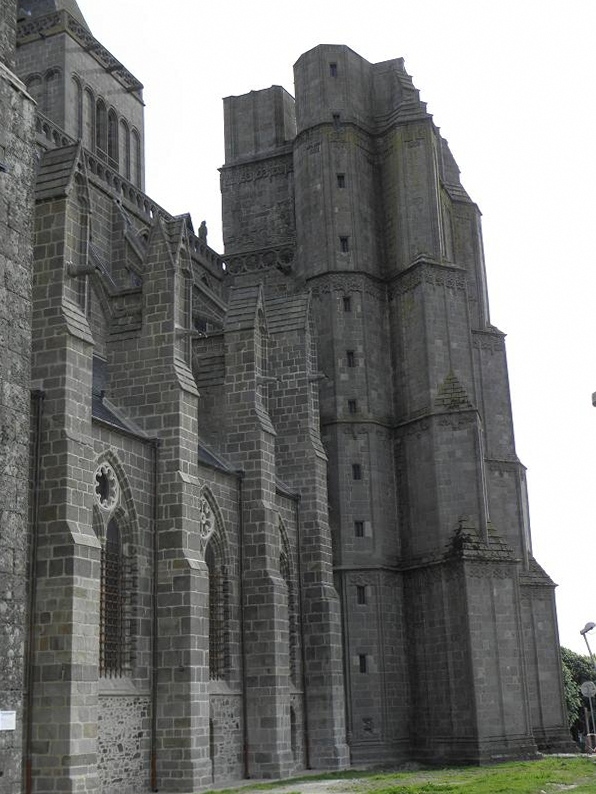
View of the north tower of the Dol-de-Bretagne cathedral

Some have likened the north tower to a dungeon rather than the tower of a cathedral and it retains some parts of the original Romanesque tower. Construction of the tower started in 1520 during the episcopy of Mathurin de Plédran (1504-1521) but the tower was not completed due to a lack of funds. Only four stories were built plus the ground floor. The tower is supported by two large buttresses and each of its four floors is lit by two small windows with a frieze above carved in the manner of a lambrequin.

=== The south tower ===
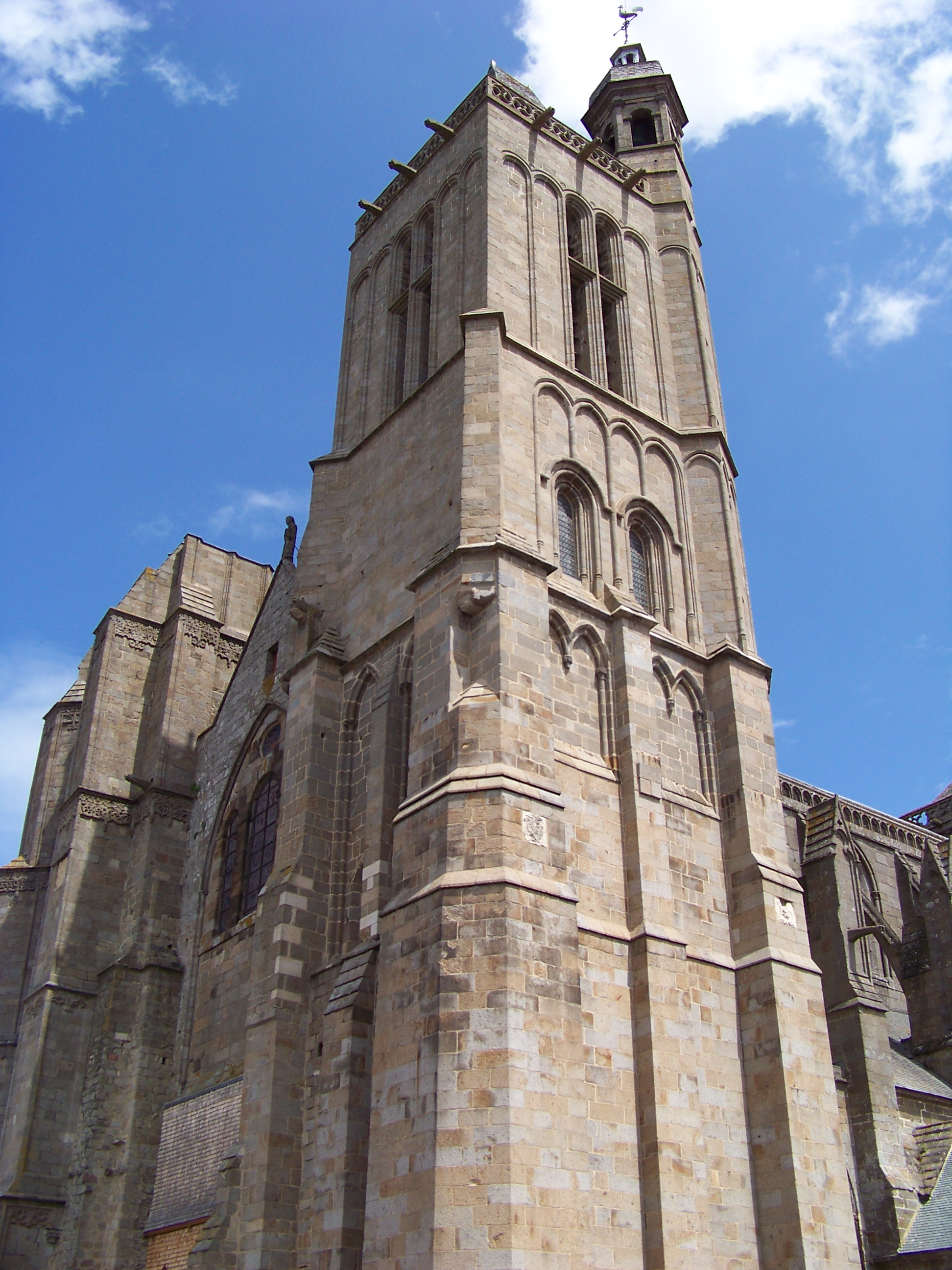
The South Tower

The south tower was built between the 13th and 17th centuries. It has four stories including the ground floor and is 52 metres high. The bell-tower (campanile) dates to the 17th century.

== The cathedral interior ==
=== The nave ===
The nave has seven bays of which six have side-aisles. It has five great arcades surmounted by a triforium and a clerestory: the traditional gothic elevation.

=== The transepts ===
The centre of the transept is formed by four Gothic arcs de triomphe. The north transept has a window dedicated to Saint Anne and the south transept has a window dedicated to Saint Magloire. The north transept holds the tombs of Thomas James and Jean de Bruc.

=== The choir ===
Completed in 1265 when Monseigneur Jean Mahé started his bishopric.

=== The Chevet ===
The cathedral chevet opens onto the ambulatory through two arches. In a niche in the chevet area, there is a small statue of the Virgin Mary with child.

=== The stalls ===
The 77 oak stalls furnishing the choir date to the early 14th century and are the oldest and most important in Brittany. The carvings are on the arm-rests of each stall rather than as at Tréguier and Saint Pol where they decorate the miséricords. At Dol, the wood-carvers have carved what is almost a complete cross section of the medieval population of the town.

=== The cathedral lay-out ===
The cathedral is best entered by the west porch and portal with the north tower on the left and south tower to the right. The cathedral's so-called "small porch" is located in the south nave. Also in the south nave and just before the south transept is the former chapter house and the chapels of Saint Magloire and the Holy Sacrament. The tomb of Thomas James is located in the north transept. Around the choir are ten chapels. Along the north side of the choir are the chapel of Saint Coeur, the chapel of saints Gilles and Roch, the chapel of saints Gilduin and Méen and the chapel of the Holy Virgin and along the south side are the sacristy, then the chapels of saints Joseph and Theresa, the chapel of Saint Michael, the chapel of Our Lady of Pity and the chapel of the Crucifix. Just before the south transept is the baptistry and the south transept is essentially the Great Porch. At the eastern end of the cathedral is the apsidal chapel, the chapel of Saint Samson.

=== The bishop's throne ===
In the choir area there is a bishop's throne or cathedra dating to the 16th century. It bears the arms of Bishop François de Laval, the sitting bishop at Dol from 1528 to 1556. Above the chair there is a finely carved crook which used to stand behind the high altar in the 18th century. It was fashioned by a Rouen sculptor called Tarlé.

=== The high altar ===
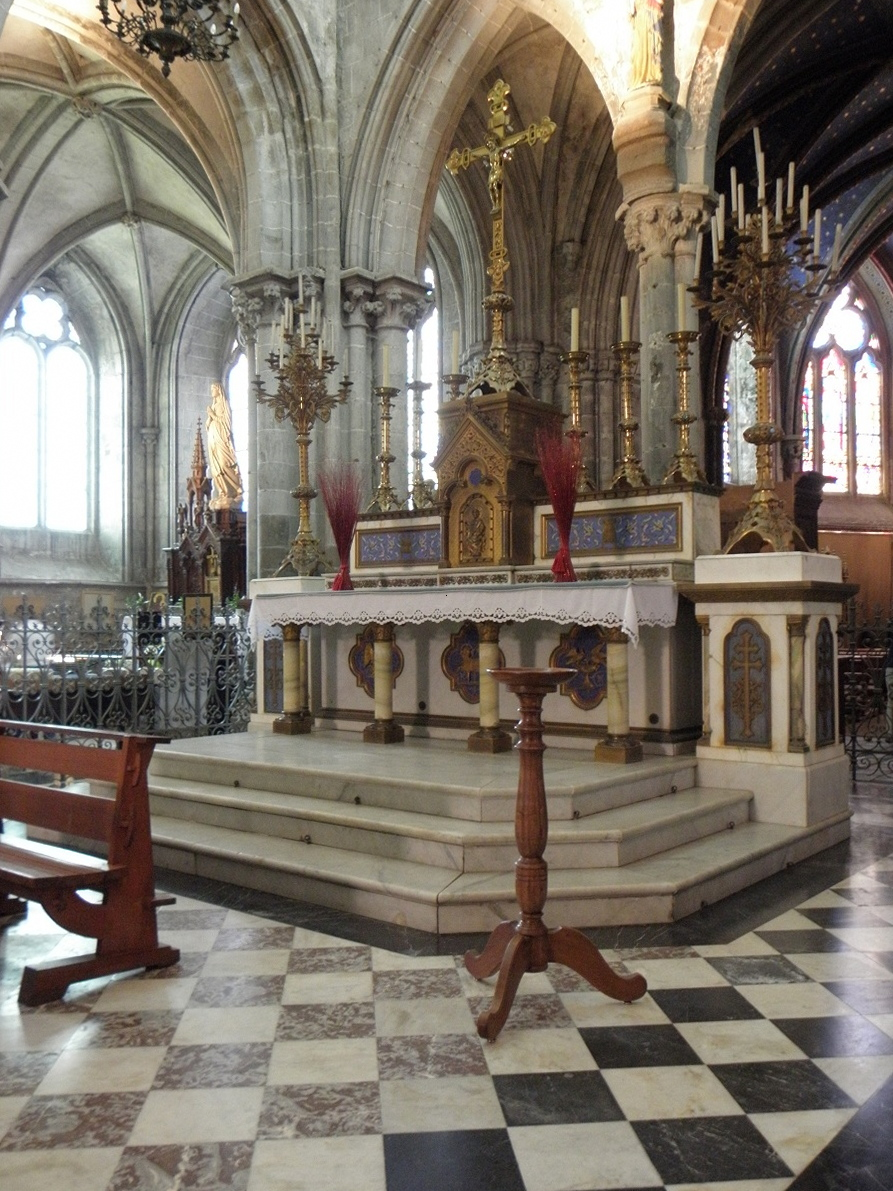
The "maître-autel"

The cathedral has two high altars. One is old and the other very modern.

Records do not show when the first high altar was installed in the cathedral ("Maître-Autel") but in 1410 it was recorded that Monseigneur Étienne Coeuret commissioned the Rennes sculptor Pierre Picart to create columns around the existing high altar these bearing coats of arms and angels holding the instruments of the passion. Near this altar and under a baldaquin the relics of Saint Samson were placed. Above this was a cross holding the "pyxide" which held the ciborium. This altar disappeared in 1744 and a new high altar was installed, this at the instigation of Monseigneur Jean-Louis de Bouschet de Sourches. It was the work of the Laval atelier of Maurice Pierlet and Honoré Pincé. In 1877, a completely new high altar was installed this by the goldsmiths Poussièlgue-Rusand based on a design by Canon Brune.

Since 1980 a completely new altar and ambo is in use, this placed in the centre of the transept. This altar is the work of Claude Gruer and is made from refractory clay and was carved directly without the use of a mould. Cuboid in form, the main faces of the altar are decorated with images of the Last Supper and another of Christ being taken down from the cross. On the secondary faces are depictions of Saint Samson crossing the channel and Saint Magloire pacifying English soldiers. It was Abbé Jules Orrière who pushed for this altar to be commissioned.

=== Pulpit ===
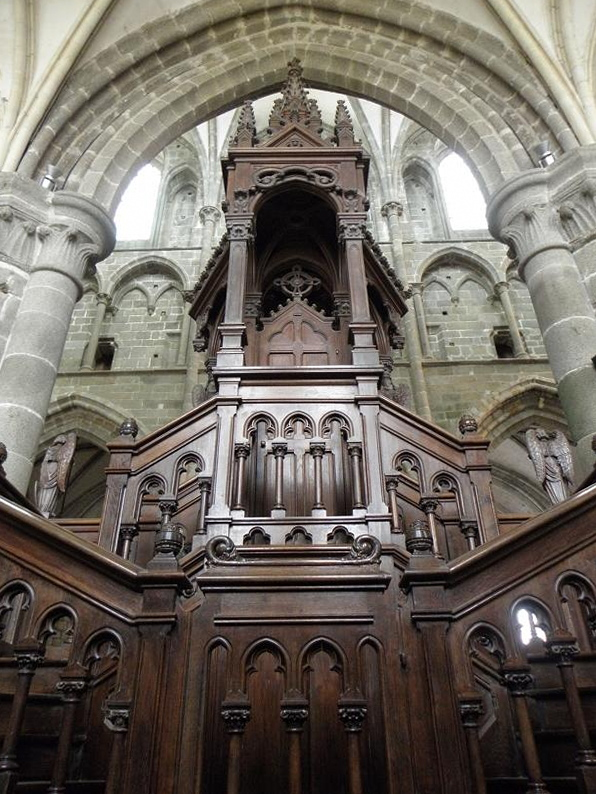
View of the pulpit from the rear

The oak pulpit was carved by the Augerie de Vitré atelier in 1898. It was commissioned by François-Joseph Turmel. The panels of the pulpit are decorated with five bas-reliefs and six statuettes depicting the great Dol saints.

=== The Great Organ and Organ loft ===
Records show that in 1575 the organ was in a state of decay although the wooden framework and the organ loft panelling date to 1579. Between 1650 and 1654 repairs were undertaken by the organ manufacturer Henri Vaignon from Normandy. The cathedral's current organ was inaugurated in 1979 and over the years the instrument was subjected to many repairs and restorations. In 1877, a new organ had been manufactured and installed by Maison Debierre of Nantes. In 1931 the organ was electrified and a major restoration took place in 1948 and in 1977 the organ was dismantled and reassembled by 1979. Jean Langlais gave the inauguration concert on 19 April 1979. Between 2014 and 2015 the instrument has been reviewed, after which a new inaugural concert took place on 5 July 2015, given by Pierre Pincemaille in front of 700 people.

=== The nave aisles ===
The nave has seven crossings but only six side-aisles due to the towers built on the western extremity of the cathedral. The aisles each have bays in tiers-point with two stained glass windows within an ogival frame. All the windows in the north nave aisles date to the 19th century except for the first window near the north tower, which dates to the 14th century. Above the two lancets are circular windows and seven of these depict the coats of arms of some of the Dol-de-Bretagne bishops. These date to the 19th century and were made by the Nantes atelier Ely, save for one which is of 16th/17th-century origin and is listed as a "Historic monument".

=== Reliquaries ===
There are two Dutch oak reliquaries in the Saint Samson chapel both carved and gilded. They contain relics of Saint Samson and Saint Magloire. They date to between 1746 and 1747 and are the work of the Rouen sculptor Jean Le François.

=== The tomb of Thomas James ===
The many tombs of former Dol bishops disappeared during the French revolution but the tomb of Thomas James, bishop of Dol from 1482 to 1504 survived, albeit mutilated and is located in the north transept. The tomb, which dates to 1507, is the work of the florentine sculptors Antoine Juste (1479-1519) and his brother Jean-Juste (1485-1549). Jean-Juste had created Louis XIII's mausoleum in Paris' Basilique Saint-Denis. It is the oldest example in Brittany of a renaissance work of art. It is decorated with pilasters and carvings representing candelabras, griffons, birds and satyrs. Two medallions on the side of the tomb name two of Thomas James' nephews, Jean and François James also buried here. The inscription reads "IOANIS - IAMEZ - IURIU - LAUTI - LEHONII - COMENDAT - DOL - THESAU - ET - CANO - IMPESA - ET - CURA - STRUCTUM - AC - ORNATU - SEPULCRU - M - VCC - VII. The tomb is located in the cathedral's north transept.

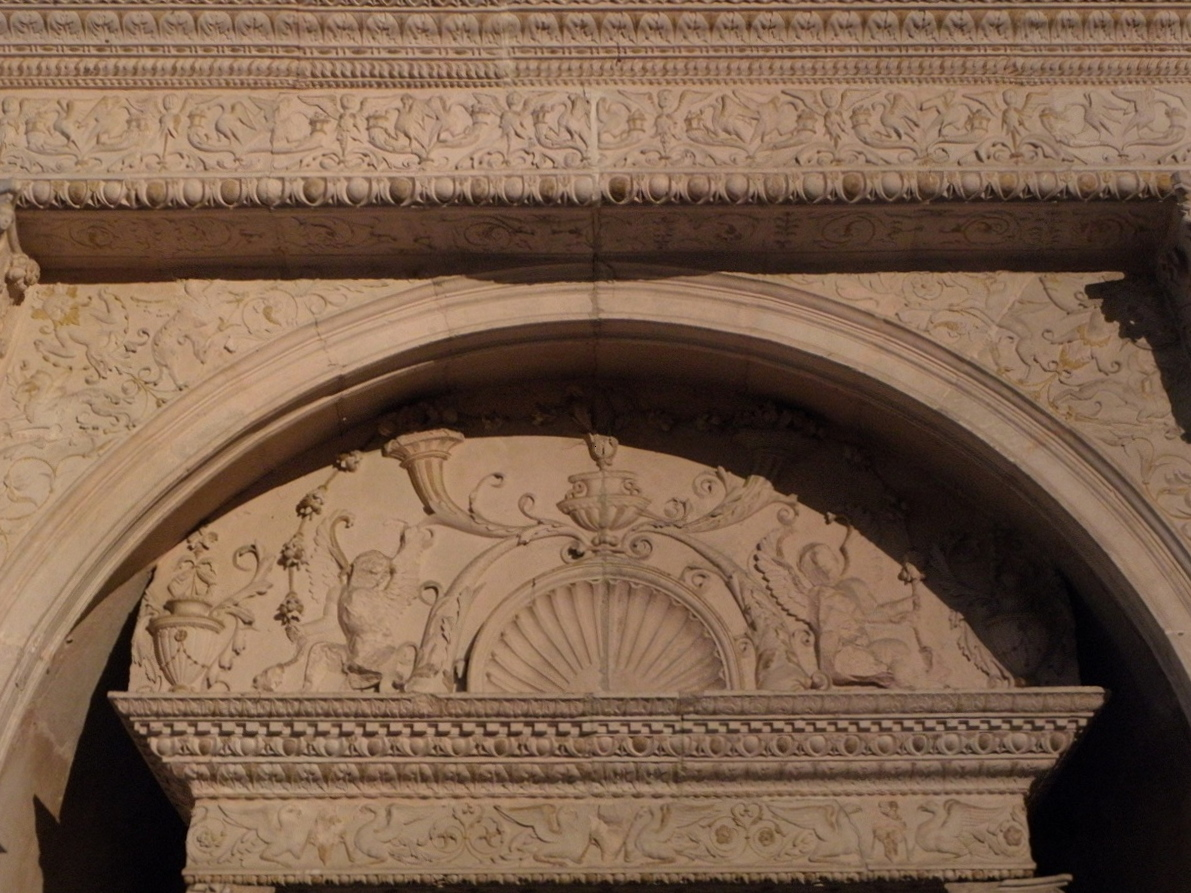
Carving on the tomb of Thomas James

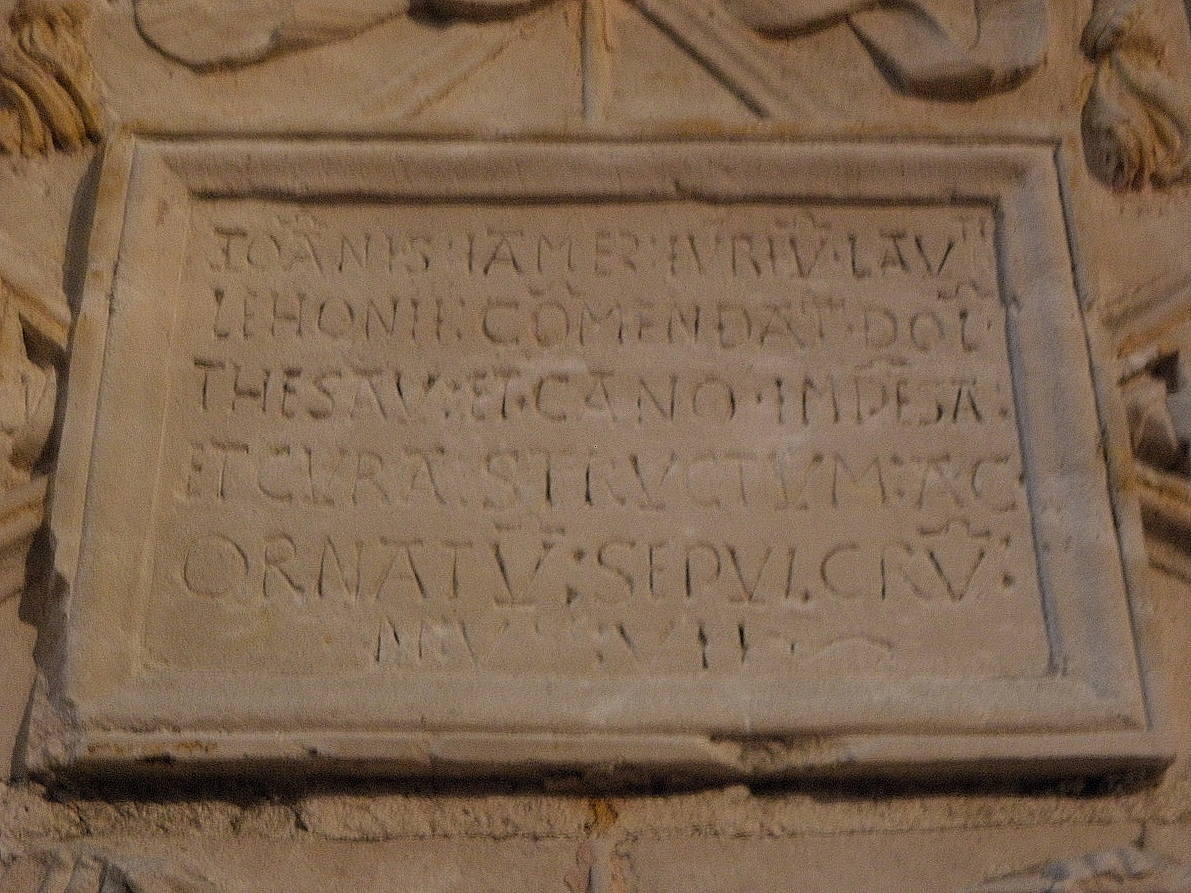
The inscription on the tomb of Thomas James - " IOANIS - IAMEZ - IURIU - LAUTI - LEHONII - COMENDAT - DOL - THESAU - ET - CANO - IMPESA - ET - CURA - STRUCTUM - AC - ORNATU - SEPULCRU - M - VCC - VII"

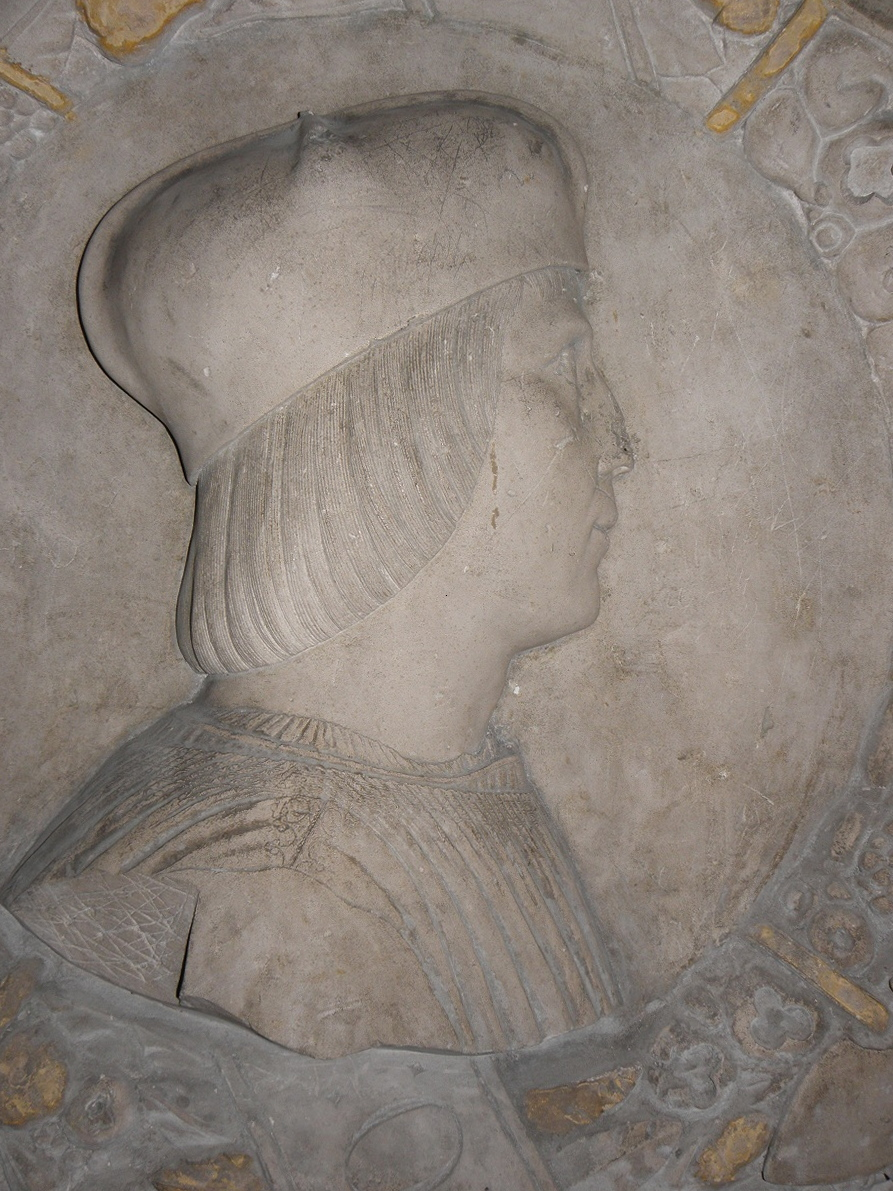
Medallion depicting Jean James, a nephew of Thomas James

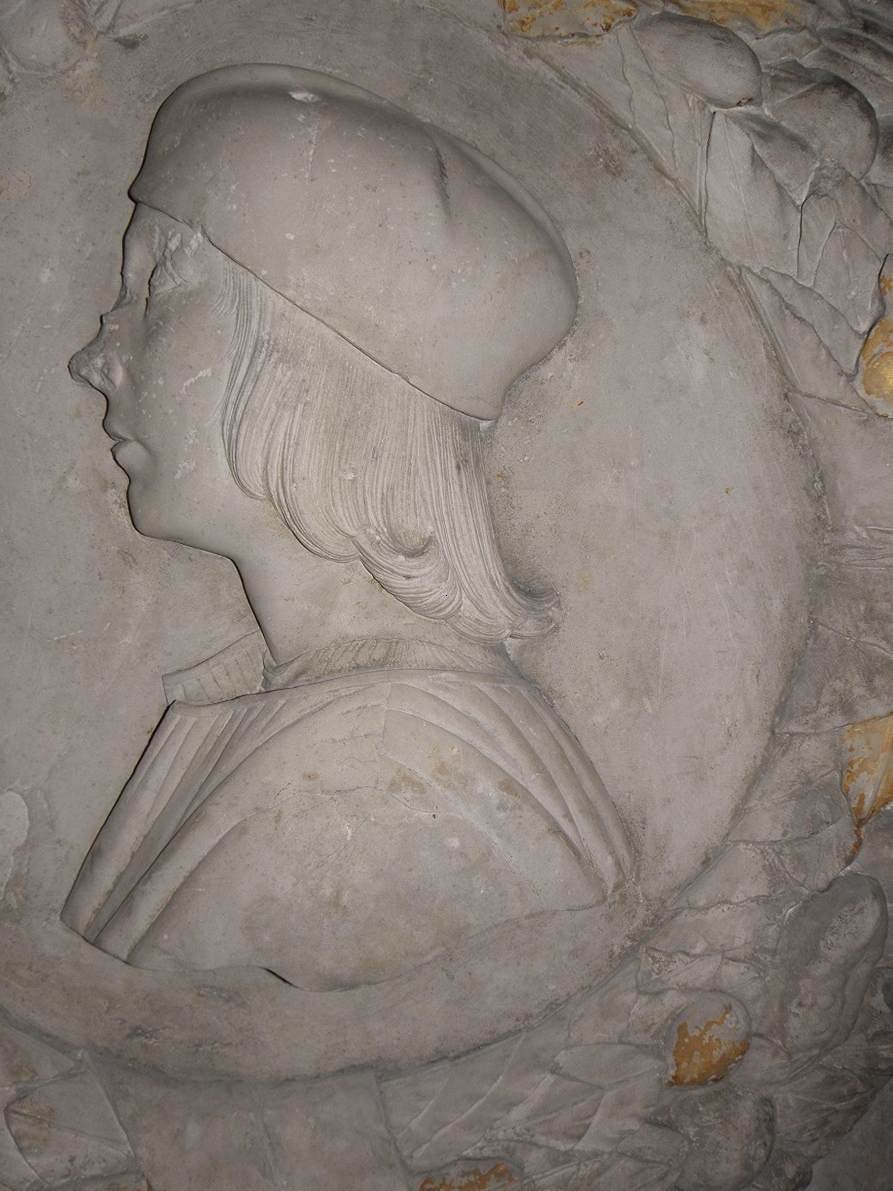
Medallion depicting François James, a nephew of Thomas James

== Records of burials of bishops ==
There are several plaques giving details of burials in the cathedral.

- Three tombs were destroyed in 1742 and plaques were subsequently installed to record the details of those buried, Monseigneur Jean Dubois, Monseigneur Etienne Coeuret and Monseigneur François de Laval.
- The marble funerary stones of Monseigneur Mathieu Thoreau and Monseigneur Jean-François Dondel.
- Another funerary stone in the cathedral is that of Marie James. A copper plaque notes that the tomb of Marie James, ordered in 1503 by his uncle Thomas James had disappeared.
- The cathedral also holds the 1638 cenotaph of Monseigneur Antoine de Révol.
- There are also plaques relating to Abbé Louis Brignon. and Monseigneur François de Laval who had been buried in the cathedral in 1554.
- Other funerary stones cover Monseigneur Mathurin de Plédran and Monseigneur Antoine de Révol. and Monseigneur Jean-Louis de Bouschet de Sourches.
- There is also a funerary plaque relating to Monseigneur Jean de Bruc. This is in engraved copper and carries de Bruc's coat of arms and an inscription in Latin.

=== Confessional ===
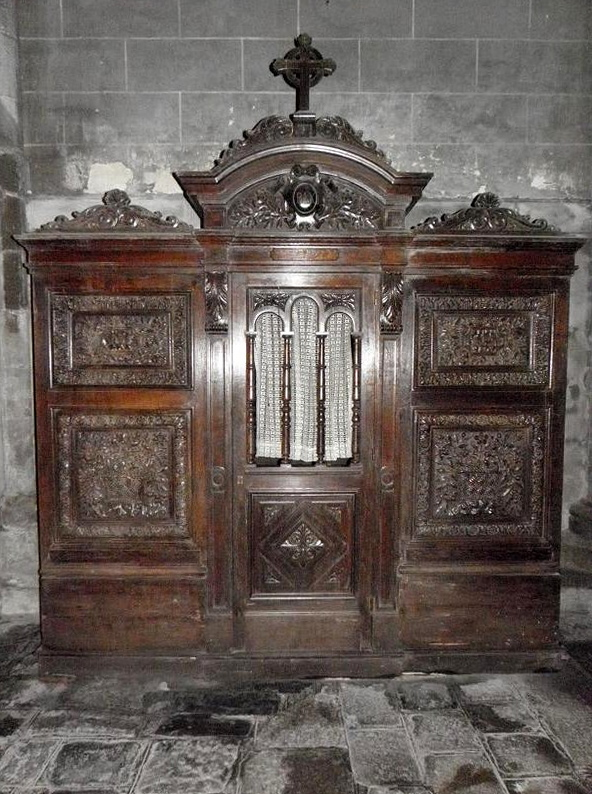
Confessional

There is a confessional box in the Chapelle Sainte Thérèse. This has 4 carved wooden panels.

=== Statuary ===
The cathedral statuary includes a fine 14th-century wooden statue of the Virgin Mary carrying Jesus which has been polychromed and gilded. This is located in a high niche at the base of the choir. There is also a "Christ aux outrages" which dates to the 13th century. It stands in the Chapelle Saint Samson.

=== Stoups ===
At the cathedral entrance, are two 15th-century baptismal fonts which serve as stoups and in the south transept, there is an 18th-century stoup in red marble. This latter stoup bears the arms of François de Laval who was the bishop of Dol from 1528 to 1554.

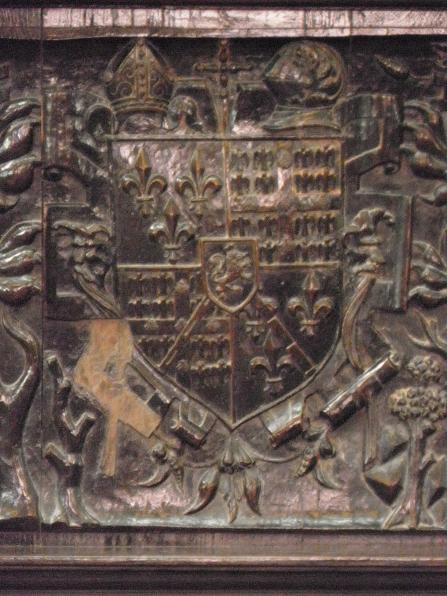
The arms of François de Laval

=== Paintings ===
Paintings on display in the cathedral include a painting of "Christ en croix", a painting "Présentation au temple" and a third "Résurrection". There is also a portrait of Monseigneur Dondel.

=== The chapels in the north ambulatory ===
The following chapels run along the north ambulatory starting from the north transept and finishing at the cathedral's chevet and the absidial chapel. The first crossing has no lateral chapel.

==== "Chapelle du Sacré-Cœur" ====
This chapel is dedicated to the "Sacré-coeur". The altar is carved from white stone. The chapel contains several statues. These include the Sacré-coeur and statues of saints Peter and Paul by the sculptor Valentin. The chapel windows depict the Last Supper and the passion as well as the "Apparition de Marguerite-Marie". The stained glass was the work of the artist Ely in 1874. By a corner of the altar, there is a credence set into the wall. The chapel contains the tomb and cenotaph of Monseigneur l'Abbé Brignon.

==== "Chapelle saint Gilles et saint Roch" ====
In the chapel dedicated to saint-Gilles and saint-Roch is a 1901 altar with a relief depicting Saint Thuriau blessing a barbarian, this executed by the sculptor Augerie. This altar replaced an earlier one carved from wood. The two saints and their virtues, as well as those of Saint Martin and Saint Hubert are depicted in the stained glass. Statues in the chapel of the two saints are thought to be by Valentin and date to 1876.

==== "Chapelle saint Gilduin et saint Méen" ====
The chapel is dedicated to Saint Gilduin, an archdeacon at Dol who refused the bishopric offered by Pope Gregory VII and Saint Méen who was a disciple of Saint Samson. The altar altarpiece and statues are by Jean-Marie Valentin and date to 1873 and the chapel's oil paintings are the work of the Rennes artist Lemoine. The stained glass tells us something of Saint Gilduin; his refusal of the bishopric, his illness, his transfer to Notre-Dame in Chartres and his death. They also depict Saint Méen amongst the sick. A reliquary on the altar in gilded bronze contains relics of these two saints.

=== "La Chapelle de la Sainte Vierge" and the "Sainte Vierge" altar ===
This is a spacious chapel serving the local parish of Crucifix The chapel is vaulted and lit by four windows. The chapel altar is carved from wood and includes a tabernacle and two bas-reliefs, one depicting the "Annunciation" and the other the "Couronnement de la Vierge". The altar is possibly the work of Jean-Julien Hérault and dates to around 1860. The altar is topped by a large statue of the Virgin Mary known as "Notre-Dame de Lourdes". The altar is surrounded by a railing.

==== "La Chapelle Absidiale" ====
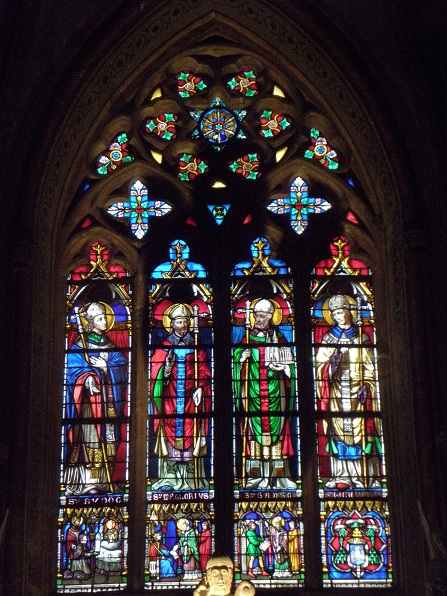
The window in the apsidial chapel

We then come to the apsidal chapel which flanks the southern side of the sacristy. The chapel is dedicated to Saint Samson and dates to the first half of the 14th century, being built during the episcopacy of Jean du Bosc (1312–24). A number of bishops were buried here including du Bosc. The north and south walls have stone benches. There are three large bay windows with stained glass dating to 1859 . These three windows by René Échappé depict various Dol bishops and under each of these depictions is a small medallion showing an event in that bishop's life. They were all executed in 1859 and take up three of the cathedral's many bays. The first of these windows features four lancets containing depictions of Saint Budoc, Saint Magloire, Saint Samson and Saint Génevé. The scene shown under Saint Budoc who was the 3rd bishop of Dol depicts Monseigneur Brossais-Saint-Marc being presented by Saint Melaine, the 1st bishop of Dol to Saint Samson and offering him a window. Beneath Saint Magloire who was the 2nd bishop of Dol, the scene shows the Comte de Jersey giving the bishop part of his land. Samson was the 1st Dol bishop and beneath his image, the scene shows Samson studying a plan of the monastery he will have built in the future. Finally under Saint Génevé are the arms and motto of Monseigneur Brossais-Saint-Marc.

In another window, this comprising three lancets, are depictions of Saint Even, Saint Leucher and Saint Thuriau. Even was the 20th bishop of Dol and in the scene beneath his image, the deacon Gilduin is shown refusing the bishopric and recommending to the Pope that Even is given the post. Leucher was the 4th bishop of Dol and in the scene beneath his image we see Leichet using the cross of Saint Samson to put out a fire which threatened the church. Beneath Thuriau's depiction, the scene shows Rivallonqui, who had set fire to a Dol-run monastery, asking Thuriau's pardon.

In another of the windows are depictions of Monseigneur Révol, Monseigneur Thoreau and Monseigneur de Hercé. Beneath the image of Révol, a bishop is shown blessing the sea, beneath Thoreau a bishop and a man are shown by a water pipe and beneath de Hercé the scene shows de Hercé being shot in 1795 with Mr.de Sombreuil. The altar is the work of Hérault, the Rennes sculptor and was executed in 1859. The absidial chapel also contains the tombs of Jean Louis de Bouschet de Sourches, Mathurin de Plédran, Antoine de Révol, Mathieu Thoreau and Jean-François Dondel.

=== The chapels in the south ambulatory ===
==== "Chapelle saint Joseph & sainte Thérèse" ====
In this chapel there is a beautiful carved wooden confessional box and the window has some fragments which date to the 14th century.

The altar is wooden with a statue in white stone of Saint Joseph. In the 19th-century stained glass window, the depiction is of Margaret of Antioch with a chained demon. This single lancet window dates to 1872 and is by Henry Ely. The window bears the inscription "Ste MARGUERITE". The chapel is divided into two parts and also contains a statue of Saint Theresa with the baby Jesus which dates to 1928.

== "La Chapelle St-Michel" and the stained glass window depicting Saint Sebastian, Saint Michel, Saint Louis, and the "glorification de la Vierge" ==
The chapel contains an altar in white stone with statues of Saint Michael, Saint Sebastian and Saint Louis wearing a crown of thorns. In this chapel is another window by Henry Ely which dates to 1876. It comprises 3 lancets and a tympanum. The lancets hold the images of the three saints and the tympanum depicts the Virgin Mary being blessed by Jesus and a group of angels and cherubs. In the lancet dedicated to Saint Sebastian scenes include his being pierced by arrows and his being beaten to death with cudgels. In the central lancet scenes include Saint Michel fighting the devil and appearing before Saint Aubert the founder of Mont-Saint-Michel and in the lancet dedicated to Saint Louis, the scenes include Louis transferring relics to the "Sainte-Chapelle" and his death at Tunis.

=== "Chapelle Notre-Dame-De-La-Pitié" ===
The altar was previously wooden with twisted columns but was replaced by one made from white stone with a statue of "Mater Dolorosa". The stained glass window's tympanum depicts "L'Adoration de l'agneau". This chapel contains a monument, installed in 1920, dedicated to those men of Dol who lost their lives in the 1914-1918 war and sculpted by André César Vermare. The scene depicts an apparition of Christ appearing to a soldier ("poilu"). The inscription reads "A LA GLOIRE DES ENFANTS DE DOL MORTS POUR LA FRANCE". In this chapel, there is a mosaic altar dedicated to Notre-Dame de Pitié executed in 1902 and the work of the sculptor Augerie and the mosaicist Isidore Odorico.

=== "La Chapelle du Crucifix" ===
This chapel holds a carving of Christ on the Cross with the Virgin Mary and John the Evangelist. This dates to 1876 and was carved by the Valentin brothers of Rennes. The stained glass depicts Jesus, between his mother and John the Evangelist and in judgement of the dead seen emerging from their tombs. This has a well which feeds water through an underground conduit to a second well (puit) outside the cathedral. Both wells are fed from the same source.

=== "Chapelle des Fonts baptismaux" ===
The baptistry with baptismal font.

=== Chapter House ===
What was the Chapterhouse (salle Capitulaire or salle du chapitre) is now the oratory Saint Magloire and dates to the 14th century.

=== Bas-relief depicting "Jésus et les docteurs" ===
This small limestone bas-relief dates to the late 19th century and depicts Jesus in discussion with the lawyers at the temple. ("After three days they found him in the temple courts, sitting among the teachers, listening to them and asking them questions". Luke.).

=== Stations of the Cross ===
The 14 "Stations of the Cross" or "Chemin de croix" in the cathedral were installed there in 1903 and were the 1868 work of the sculptor Jean-Baptiste Germain. They are worked in the repoussé fashion in copper which was then gilded and silvered. The wooden frames were added in 1970.

=== Stained glass ===
The cathedral is one of the few religious buildings in Brittany to retain stained glass windows from the 13th century, and when restoring windows during the following centuries they used fragments of glass recovered from windows of the 14th, 15th and 16th centuries.

==== La maîtresse-vitre du chevet ====
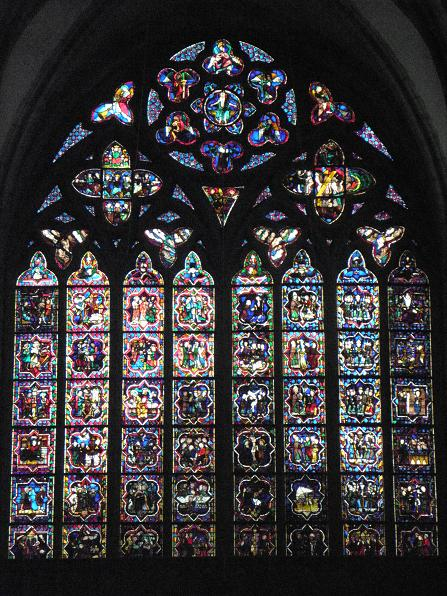
The chevet window

The main stained glass window of the chevet, which is effectively the window lighting the choir, dates to between 1280 and 1290. The window was restored at the beginning of the 17th century and was reglazed in 1870 when many of the older frames were saved by the glazier/artist Oudinot. This major restoration was commissioned by Monseigneur l'abbé Brignon. During the 1944 bombing which preceded Dol-de-Bretagne's liberation from German occupation, explosions badly damaged the window necessitating restoration work by the master glazier Jacques Gruber. A further restoration was carried out between 1982 and 1986. The window is made up of eight lancets above which is an elaborate tympanum and these lancets contain forty-eight frames recounting details from the lives of those saints said to have relics held in the cathedral. These are a belt from Sainte-Marguerite, pieces of the chêne de Mambré, remnants of Saint Samson and Saint Catherine's teeth. The eight lancets, from the left and from the top to the bottom depict:-

1. The history of Margaret the Virgin or Margaret of Antioch
2. The history of Abraham
3. Scenes from Jesus' childhood
4. The Passion.
5. The Passion.
6. The history of Saint Samson
7. Depicts the first six Archbishops of Dol, surrounded by their suffragan bishops, the bishops of Léon, Tréguier, Quimper, Vannes, Aleth and Saint-Brieuc. The Archbishops are Samson, Magloire, Saint Budoc, Saint Leucher, Saint Thuriau and Saint Genévé, each wearing a pallium a mitre and with a halo. Each carries the archbishop's cross.
8. The history of Catherine of Alexandria

The tympanum represents the Final judgement. In the quatrefoil to the right of Christ is a depiction of Paradise whilst that to the left depicts Hell with the enormous jaws of a green dragon.

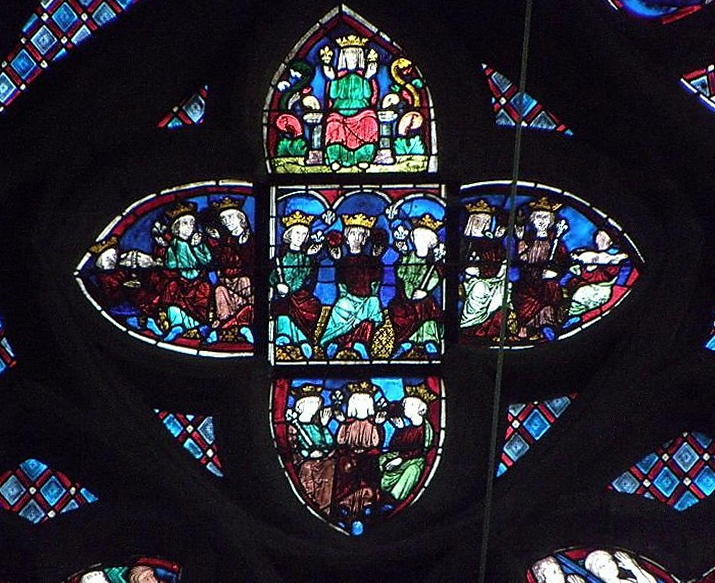
The Virgin Mary and the "chosen" wearing crowns. A quadrilobe on the left side of the window's tympanum.

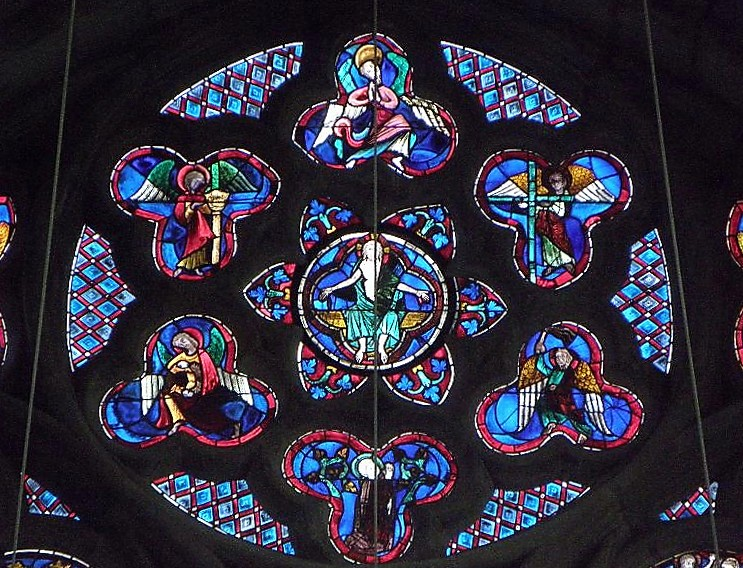
A figure of Christ in judgement surrounded by angels bearing the instruments of the passion. The rose in the window's tympanum

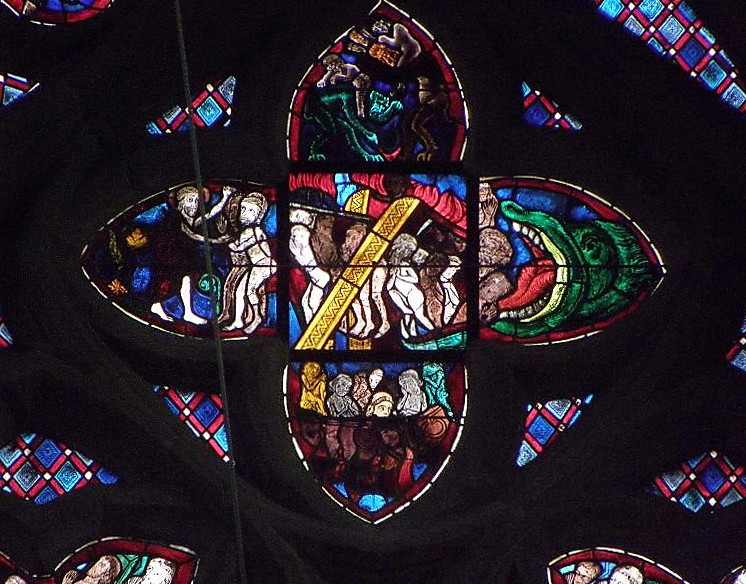
Jesus helps the innocents from the mouth of hell. The quadrilobe on the right side of the window's tympanum

==== The upper windows of the choir and transept ====
Most of these windows are grisailles from the year 1290 and completed in 1890–1891. The windows in the transept crossings depict four archbishops. These date to 1265 to 1270 and were restored in 1890 by Jacquier and Küchelbecker. At a later date, the shields of the bishops Jean de Lizaunet and Jean Mahé were added to the window in the north crossing and the arms of Thibaud de Pouancé and Jean du Bosc to the window on the south crossing.

==== The tympanums in the choir chapel windows ====
Some of the choir chapel windows have used fragments of earlier windows in their tympanums.

- In the la chapelle de la Vierge windows tympanum there is a depiction of Christ accompanied by the Tetramorph this taken from an earlier window.
- In the chapelle Saint-Joseph there is a "Christ en gloire" with Tetramorph and angels playing musical instruments, this fragment having come from a 1420s window.
- In the chapelle du Crucifix there is a fragment from an earlier window which depicts the final judgement

==== The main windows in the south and north transept ====
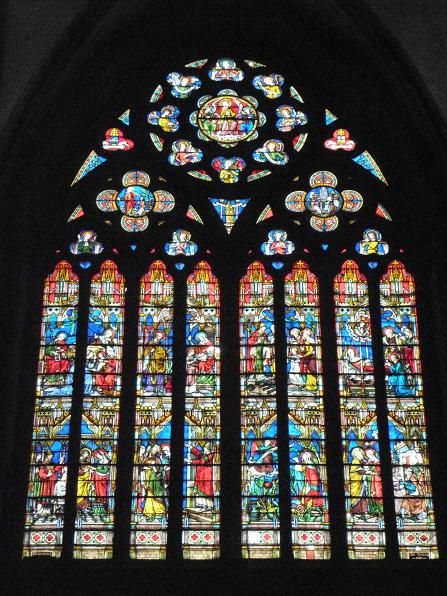
The main window of the north transept of the cathédrale Saint-Samson de Dol de Bretagne. Depicts scenes from the life of Sainte Anne

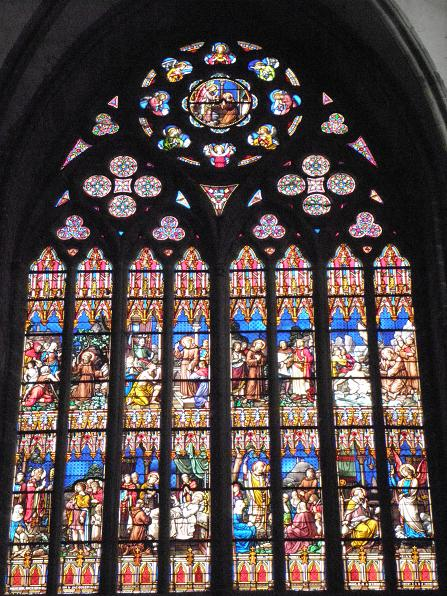
The main window of the south transept of the cathédrale Saint-Samson de Dol de Bretagne. Depicts scenes from the life of Saint Magloire

The "Saint Magloire" appears in the cathedral's bay 104. It dates to 1884 and depicts scenes from Magloire's life. It was the work of the Le Mans atelier of Jacquier and Maurice Küchelbecker. This window replaced an earlier window dating to 1280. In bay 103 is the window dedicated to Saint Anne and this bears the arms of pope Léon XIII in the left side spandrel and the arms of Dol in the spandrel on the right. Also the work of Jacquier and Maurice Küchelbecker this window dates to 1887"

The Magloire window relates episodes from the life of Saint Magloire, who succeeded Saint Samson on the episcopal throne. It dates to 1884 and was the work of the atelier Jacquier and Küchelbecker of Mans. The window's eight lancets each had eight frames. In the lower level, Magloire is shown leaving the world, his being nominated as Samson's successor, his preaching to the people of Dol in front of Mont Dol, abdicating in favour of Saint Budoc. In the window's upper level we see Magloire enjoying the solitude of Mont-Dol, curing a rich Breton who gave him half of the island of Sercq where he built a monastery and rescuing a fisherman drowning in the sea. In the tympanum Magloire receives communion surrounded by angels.

The same atelier of Jacquier and Küchelbecker installed the window depicting scenes from the life of Saint Anne in the north transept. These include the marriage of Anne and Joachim, the high priest rejecting Joachim's sacrifice, the announcement of the birth of the Virgin Mary to Anne and the meeting at the Golden Gate, all in the first frame. In the second frame, the scenes depict the Virgin Mary's birth, the Virgin Mary's education, the Virgin Mary's presentation at the temple and the death of Saint Anne. The tympanum is decorated with two quartilobes and a rosace showing Yves Nicolazic seeing the apparition of Saint Anne, the pilgrimage of Bretons to Sainte-Anne-d'Auray and Saint Anne "in glory" amidst a group of angels.

=== Sculpture ===
==== "Le Christ aux liens/Le Christ aux Outrages" ====
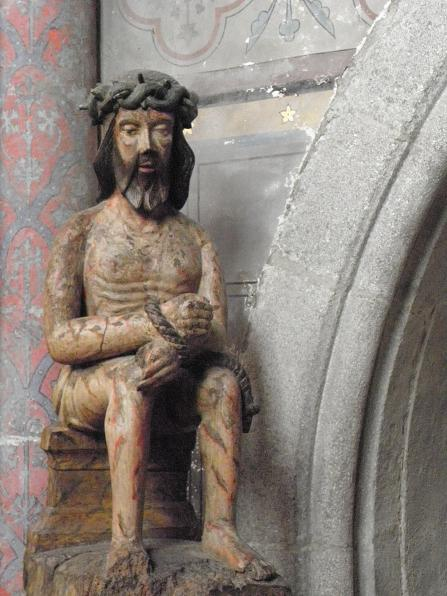
The wooden sculpture showing Christ after he has been scourged and beaten and sits awaiting crucifixion

This 16th-century wooden and polychromed sculpture showing Christ waiting for the crucifixion and showing the signs of the beating and humiliation he has suffered ("Christ souffrant") is located in the aisle to the north of the nave. It dates to the 16th century. It came from the old manor of Beauvais.

==== "La Vierge-mère" ====
Another wooden painted sculpture depicting the Virgin Mary is situated at the entrance to the south nave. Prior to 1792 this sculpture had been part of the rood screen which was pulled down by the revolutionaries.

==== Lutrin ====
The cathedral lutrin takes the form of an eagle

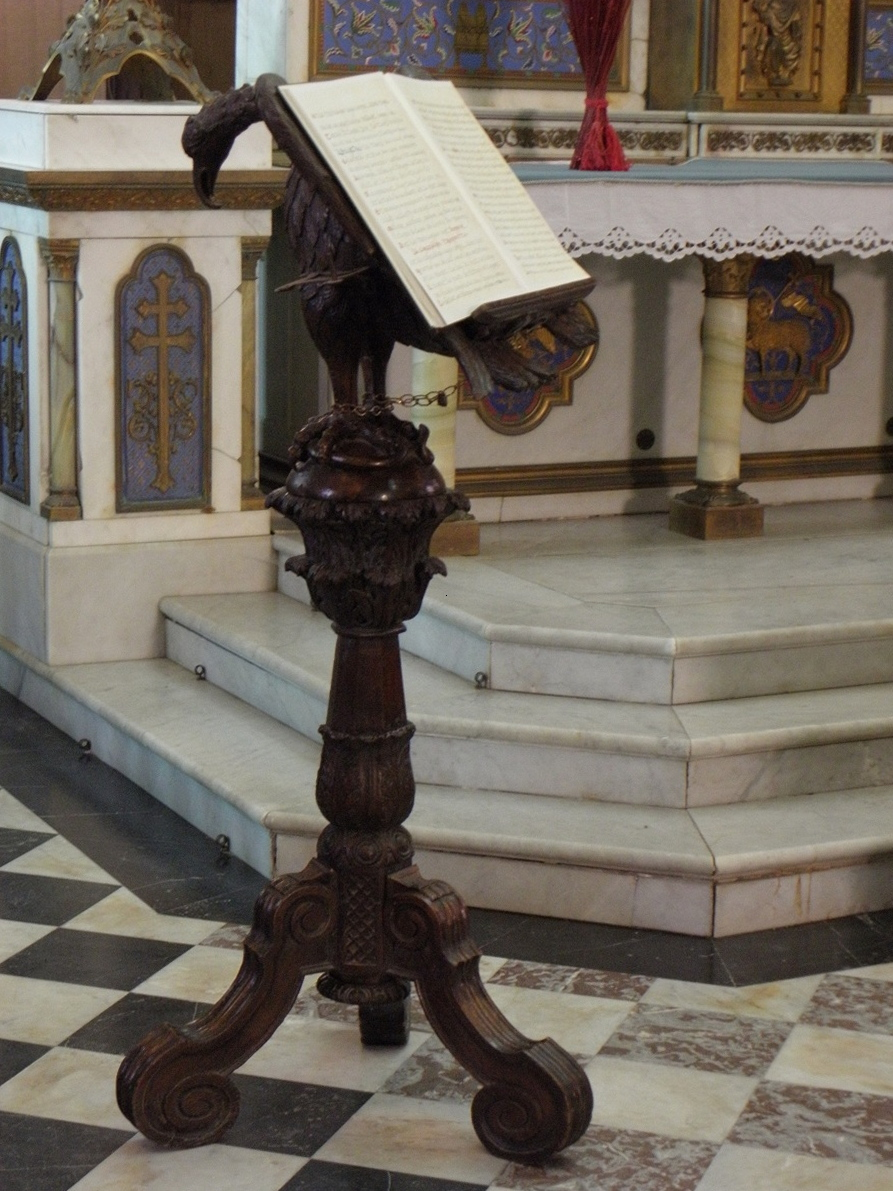
The lutrin

==== King Nominoë ====
This statue stands in the grounds outside the cathedral. Nominoe, Nominoë in French or Nevenoe in Breton was the first Duke of Brittany from 846 to 851. He is the Breton pater patriae and to Breton nationalists is known as Tad ar Vro ("father of the country"). He was succeeded by his son Erispoe. Both are buried at Redon Abbey. Erispoe was assassinated in 857 by his cousin and successor Salomon. Salomon (Breton: Salaün) was Count of Rennes and Nantes from 852 and Duke of Brittany from 857 until his death by assassination in 874. He used the title King of Brittany intermittently after 868. He was canonised as "Saint Salomon" after his death and raised to the rank of martyr. His death resulted from a conspiracy involving Pascweten, Wrhwant, and Wigo, son of Riwallon, Count of Cornouaille, but they quickly fell out with each other and a civil war followed until 876. Judicael (or Yezekael) (died 888 or 889) was the Duke of Brittany from 876 to his death in 888 or 889 He was a son of a daughter of Erispoe and had claimed Brittany after the death of the pretenders Wrhwant and Pascweten in 876. Judicael reconciled with Alan to fight the Vikings, however. Together, they defeated the raiders at the Battle of Questembert in 888 or 889, but Judicael lost his life in the fighting. After his death Brittany was ruled by Alan I, King of Brittany and then Gourmaëlon. From 907 to 938 Brittany was occupied by the Vikings. There is a much larger memorial to Nominoë at Bains-sur-Oust which celebrates the victory of the Bretons over the French.

=== Sarcophagus ===
In the cathedral's presbytery garden there is a granite sarcophagus which is thought to have received Saint Samson's remains when he died in 565. This was placed in the garden by abbé Pierre Chevrier a curate at Dol between 1841 and 1866. The sarcophagus has lost its cover. Before removal to the presbytery, the sarcophagus was kept inside the cathedral. When the Normans invaded Brittany in 878 it was decided to move Samson's remains to a safer place but the sarcophagus had been too heavy to transport and was left in Dol. When the relics were returned to Dol they were never put back inside the sarcophagus but kept in another container.

=== Other stained glass windows ===
High up in the eastern side of the south transept there is a window dating to around 1265 to 1270 depicting two other Dol bishops, Thibaud de Pouancé and Henri Du Bois.

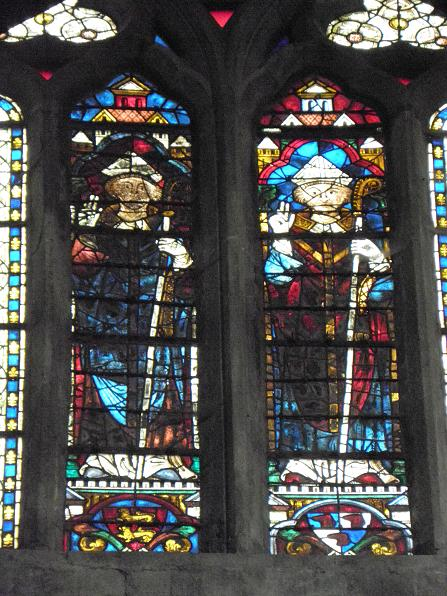

== Notes ==
=== Sources ===
- Catholic Hierarchy: Diocese of Dol
- "Cathédrales et basiliques de Bretagne" Éditions Ereme with texts by Yves-Pascal Castel, Chantal Leroy and Dominique de La Rivière. ISBN 9 782915 337693.
- "Cathédrale de Dol de Bretagne". Printed by Rhédonis 1955. By Abbé Y.Corrion.
- "Dol-de-Bretagne its Cathedral".
- "Dol-de-Bretagne. Guide Touristique et Histoire". By Patrick Amiot. ISBN 2-9500 660-2-X. Imprimerie Du Guesclin. Di

== See also ==
- List of Gothic Cathedrals in Europe
