= Quatrefoil (disambiguation) =

A quatrefoil (four leaf) is a decorative element of four partially overlapping circles.

Quatrefoil may also refer to:

- Quatrefoil: A Modern Novel, a 1950 book by James Barr
- Quatrefoil Library, in Minneapolis, Minnesota, U.S.
- Quatrefoil reentry, a type of cardiac arrhythmia

== See also ==
- Foil (architecture)
- Trefoil (disambiguation) (three leaf)
- Cinquefoil (disambiguation) (five leaf)
- Four-leaf clover
