= Trefoil (disambiguation) =

A trefoil (three leaf) is a graphic form composed of three leaves or lobes.

Trefoil may also refer to:

- Clover, or trefoil, common names for plants of the genus Trifolium
- Trefoil Island, an island in Australia, part of Tasmania's Trefoil Island Group
- Trefoil, Alberta, a locality in Special Area No. 2, Alberta, Canada
- Trefoil knot, the simplest example of a nontrivial knot
- Trefoil, a variation of the card game La Belle Lucie
- Trefoils, a variety of Girl Scout cookie
- Trefoil-class concrete barge, an American Type B ship
  - USS Trefoil (IX-149)
- USS Trefoil (1865), a Union Navy steamer

== See also ==
- Quatrefoil (disambiguation) (four leaf)
- Cinquefoil (disambiguation) (five leaf)
- Lotus (genus), flowering plants that include species with common names including "trefoil"
- Trefoil Guild, part of Girlguiding
- Vertical trefoil and oblique trefoil, Zernike polynomials
- Trefoil knot fold, a protein fold
