= Cinquefoil (disambiguation) =

Cinquefoil or Potentilla is a genus containing over 300 species of flowering plants in the rose family.

Cinquefoil may also refer to:

- Comarum, a genus of plants formerly included with Potentilla
- Dasiphora, woody cinquefoils
- Drymocallis, a genus formerly included with Potentilla
- Sibbaldiopsis, three-toothed cinquefoil
- The cinquefoil knot, a knot whose outline resembles a cinquefoil flower
- A pattern in heraldry resembling a cinquefoil flower; see Charge (heraldry)#Plants

== See also ==
- Foil (architecture)
- Quatrefoil
- Trefoil
