= Leprechaun =

Irish legendary creature

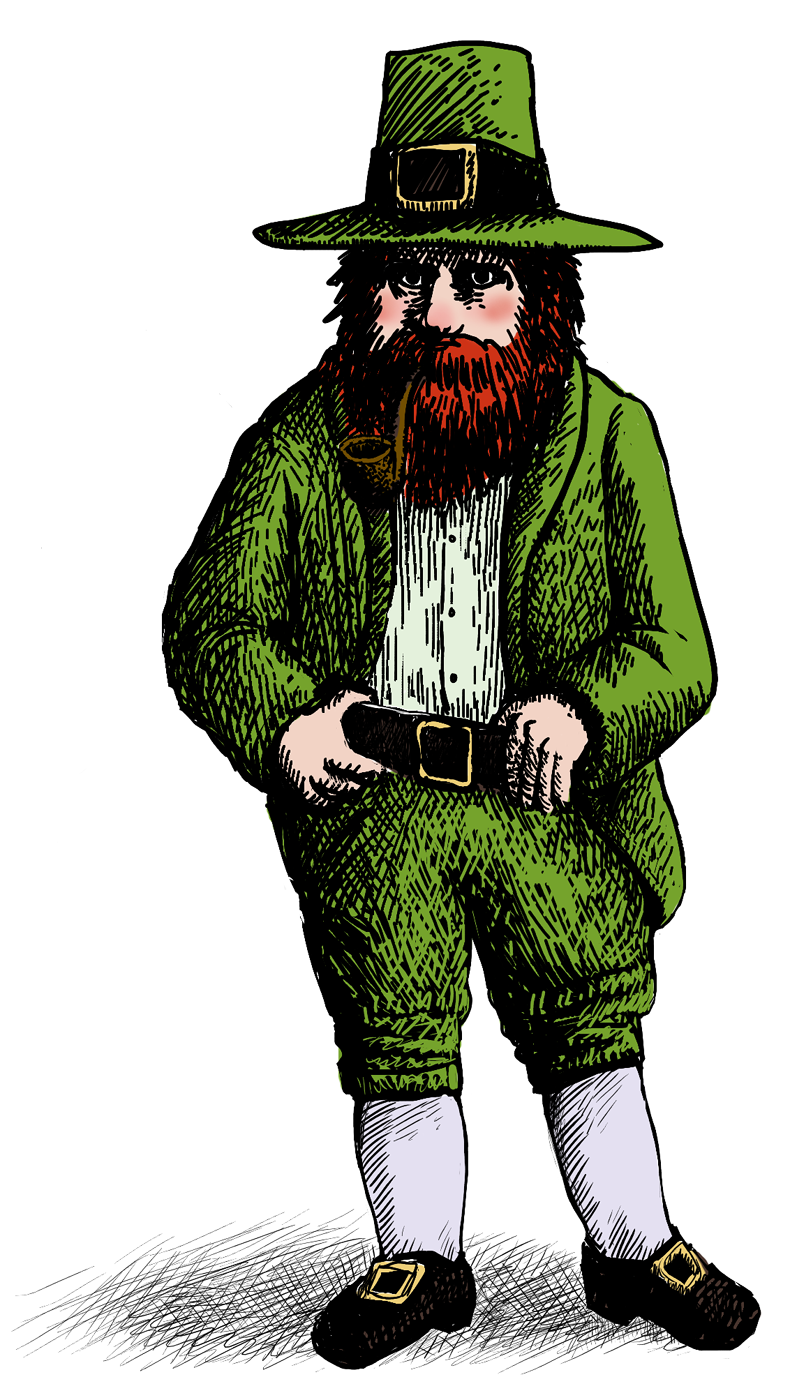
- A modern depiction of a leprechaun of the type popularised in the 20th century

Creature information
- Grouping: Legendary creature Pixie; Sprite; Fairy; Aos Sí

Origin
- First attested: In folklore
- Country: Ireland
- Details: Found in a moor, forest, cave, garden

A leprechaun (Irish: lucharachán/leipreachán/luchorpán) is a diminutive supernatural being in Irish folklore, classed by some as a type of solitary fairy. They are usually depicted as little bearded men, wearing a coat and hat, who partake in mischief. In later times, they have been depicted as shoe-makers who have a hidden pot of gold at the end of the rainbow.

Leprechaun-like creatures rarely appear in Irish mythology and only became prominent in later folklore.

== Etymology ==
The Anglo-Irish (Hiberno-English) word leprechaun is descended from Old Irish luchorpán or lupracán, via various (Middle Irish) forms such as luchrapán, lupraccán, (or var. luchrupán). (Note: Another (intermediary) form is luchrupán, listed by Ernst Windisch, which is identified as Middle Irish by the OED Windisch does not comment on this being the root to English "leprechaun")

=== Modern forms ===
The current spelling leipreachán is used throughout Ireland, but there are numerous regional variants.

John O'Donovan's supplement to O'Reilly's Irish-English Dictionary defines lugharcán, lugracán, lupracán as "a sprite, a pigmy; a fairy of a diminutive size, who always carries a purse containing a shilling". (Note: Patrick Dinneen (1927) defines as "a pigmy, a sprite, or leprechaun".)

The Irish term leithbrágan in O'Reilly's Dictionary has also been recognized as an alternative spelling.

Other variant spellings in English have included lubrican, leprehaun, and lepreehawn. Some modern Irish books use the spelling lioprachán. The first recorded instance of the word in the English language was in Dekker's comedy The Honest Whore, Part 2 (1604): "As for your Irish lubrican, that spirit / Whom by preposterous charms thy lust hath rais'd / In a wrong circle."

=== Meanings ===
The word may have been coined as a compound of the roots lú or laghu (from Greek: ἐ-λαχύ "small") and corp (from Latin: corpus "body"), or so it had been suggested by Whitley Stokes. (Note: The root corp, which was borrowed from the Latin corpus, attests to the early influence of Ecclesiastical Latin on the Irish language.) Research published in 2019 suggests the word derives from the Luperci and associated Roman festival of Lupercalia.

Folk etymology derives the word from leith (half) and bróg (brogue), because of the frequent portrayal of the leprechaun as working on a single shoe, as evident in the alternative spelling leithbrágan.

== Early attestations ==
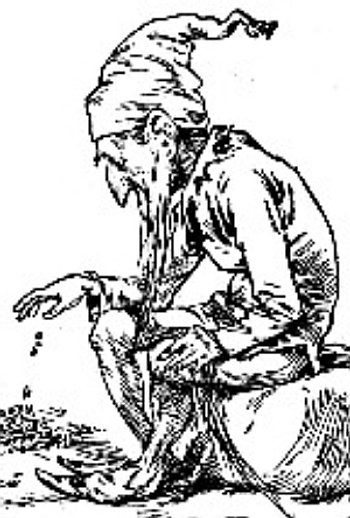
A leprechaun counts his gold in this engraving c. 1900

The earliest known reference to the leprechaun appears in the medieval tale known as the Echtra Fergus mac Léti ('Adventure of Fergus son of Léti'). The saga exists in two widely divergent versions. The first of these is written in Dublin, Trinity College MS 1337 pp. 363b–365a, better known as H.3.18 (CIH iii: 882.4–883.28) and has been dated to the eighth century (Binchy 1952). The second version is a copy of the 8th century text written on a single leaf inserted into London, British Library MS Harley 432 f.5 (CIH ii: 354.28–355.41). The saga was rewritten in the 13th century as a burlesque version. The text contains an episode in which Fergus mac Léti, King of Ulster, falls asleep on the beach and wakes to find himself being dragged into the sea by three lúchorpáin. He captures his abductors, who grant him three wishes in exchange for release.

== Folklore ==
The leprechaun is said to be a solitary creature, whose principal occupation is making and cobbling shoes, and who enjoys practical jokes. In McAnally's 1888 account, the Leprechaun was not a professional cobbler, but was frequently seen mending his own shoes, as "he runs about so much he wears them out" with great frequency. This is, he claims, the perfect opportunity for a human being to capture the Leprechaun, refusing to release him until the Leprechaun gives his captor supernatural wealth.

== Classification ==
The leprechaun has been classed as a "solitary fairy" by the writer and amateur folklorist William Butler Yeats. (Note: Or Yeats of "armchair folklore", to use a moniker from Kinahan's paper.) Yeats was part of the revivalist literary movement greatly influential in "calling attention to the leprechaun" in the late 19th century. This classification by Yeats is derived from D. R. McAnally (Irish Wonders, 1888) derived in turn from John O'Hanlon (1870).

It is stressed that the leprechaun, though some may call it fairy, is clearly to be distinguished from the Aos Sí (or the 'good people') of the fairy mounds (sidhe) and raths. (Note: Winberry (1976), p. 63: "The leprechaun is unique among Irish fairies and should not be confused with the Aes Sidhe, the 'good people', who populate the fairy mounds and raths, steal children, beguile humans, and perform other malicious pranks. "; also partially quoted by Harvey.) (Note: The anthologist Charles Squire makes the further considers the Irish fairy to be part of the tradition of the Tuatha Dé Danann, whereas the leprachaun, puca (and the English/Scottish household spirits) have a different origin.) Leprachaun being solitary is one distinguishing characteristic, but additionally, the leprachaun is thought to only engage in pranks on the level of mischief, and requiring special caution, but in contrast, the Aos Sí may carry out deeds more menacing to humans, e.g., the spiriting away of children.

This identification of leprechaun as a fairy has been consigned to popular notion by modern folklorist Diarmuid Ó Giolláin. Ó Giolláin observes that the dwarf of Teutonic and other traditions, as well as the household familiar, are more amenable to comparison.

According to William Butler Yeats, the great wealth of the leprechauns comes from the "treasure-crocks, buried of old in war-time", which they have uncovered and appropriated. According to David Russell McAnally, the leprechaun is the son of an "evil spirit" and a "degenerate fairy" and is "not wholly good nor wholly evil".

=== Appearance ===
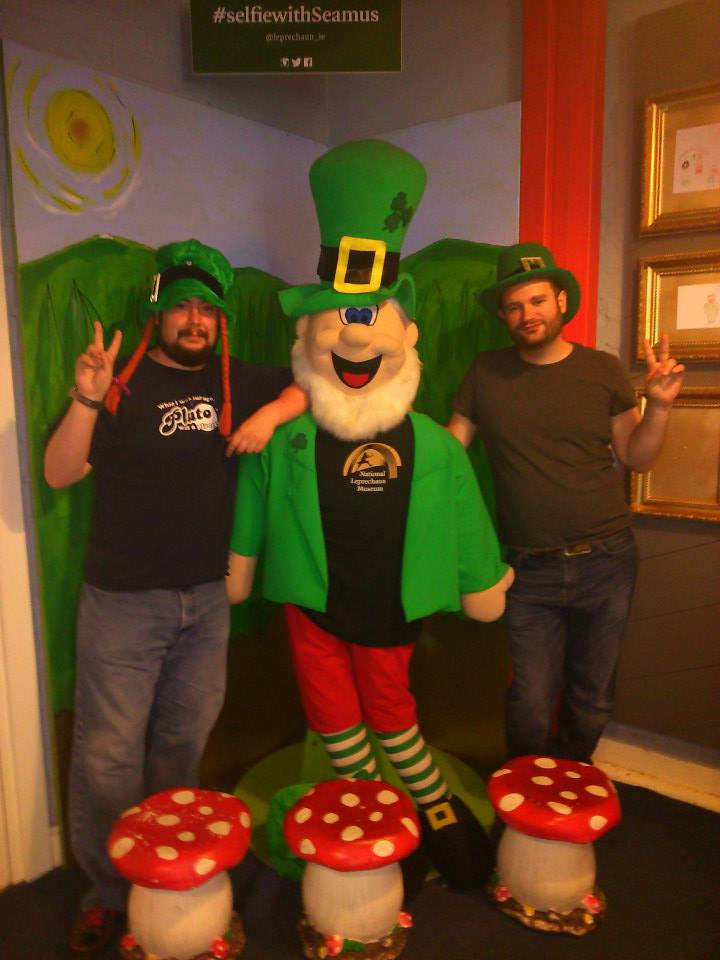
Tourists with a novelty oversized Leprechaun in Dublin

The leprechaun originally had a different appearance depending on where in Ireland he was found. Before the 20th century, it was generally held that the leprechaun wore red, not green. Samuel Lover, writing in 1831, describes the leprechaun as,

... quite a beau in his dress, notwithstanding, for he wears a red square-cut coat, richly laced with gold, and inexpressible of the same, cocked hat, shoes and buckles.

According to Yeats, the solitary fairies, like the leprechaun, wear red jackets, whereas the "trooping fairies" wear green. Yeats' leprechaun wore a jacket with seven rows of buttons with seven buttons to each row. Yeats describes that on the western coast, the red jacket is covered by a frieze one, whereas in Ulster the creature wears a cocked hat, and when he is up to anything unusually mischievous, he leaps onto a wall and spins, balancing himself on the point of the hat with his heels in the air.

According to McAnally the universal leprechaun is described as follows:

He is about three feet high, and is dressed in a little red jacket or roundabout, with red breeches buckled at the knee, gray or black stockings, and a hat, cocked in the style of a century ago, over a little, old, withered face. Round his neck is an Elizabethan ruff, and frills of lace are at his wrists. On the wild west coast, where the Atlantic winds bring almost constant rains, he dispenses with ruff and frills and wears a frieze overcoat over his pretty red suit, so that, unless on the lookout for the cocked hat, ye might pass a Leprechawn on the road and never know it's himself that's in it at all.

This dress varied by region. In McAnally's account there were differences between leprechauns or Logherymans from different regions:

- The Northern Leprechaun or Logheryman wore a "military red coat and white breeches, with a broad-brimmed, high, pointed hat, on which he would sometimes stand upside down".
- The Lurigadawne of Tipperary wore an "antique slashed jacket of red, with peaks all round and a jockey cap, also sporting a sword, which he uses as a magic wand".
- The Luricawne of Kerry was a "fat, pursy little fellow whose jolly round face rivals in redness the cut-a-way jacket he wears, that always has seven rows of seven buttons in each row".
- The Cluricawne of Monaghan wore "a swallow-tailed evening coat of red with green vest, white breeches, black stockings," shiny shoes, and a "long cone hat without a brim," sometimes used as a weapon.

In a poem entitled The Lepracaun; or, Fairy Shoemaker, 19th-century Irish poet William Allingham describes the appearance of the leprechaun as:

...A wrinkled, wizen'd, and bearded Elf,

Spectacles stuck on his pointed nose,

Silver buckles to his hose,

Leather apron — shoe in his lap...

The modern image of the leprechaun sitting on a toadstool, having a red beard and green hat, etc. is a more modern invention, or borrowed from other strands of European folklore. The most likely explanation for the modern day Leprechaun appearance is that green is a traditional national Irish color dating back as far as 1642. The hat might be derived from the style of outdated fashion still common in Ireland in the 19th century. This style of fashion was commonly worn by Irish immigrants to the United States, since some Elizabethan era clothes were still common in Ireland in the 19th century long after they were out of fashion, as depicted by the Stage Irish. The buckle shoes and other garments also have their origin in the Elizabethan period in Ireland.

== Similar creatures ==
The leprechaun is similar to the clurichaun and the far darrig in that he is a solitary creature. Some writers even go as far as to replace these second two less well-known spirits with the leprechaun in stories or tales to reach a wider audience. The clurichaun is considered by Yeats to be merely a leprechaun on a drinking spree.

== In politics ==
In the politics of the Republic of Ireland, leprechauns have been used to refer to the twee aspects of the tourism field in Ireland. This can be seen from this example of John A. Costello addressing the Oireachtas in 1963:

For many years, we were afflicted with the miserable trivialities of our tourist advertising. Sometimes it descended to the lowest depths, to the caubeen and the shillelagh, not to speak of the leprechaun.

== Popular culture ==
Films, animated cartoons, and advertising have popularised a specific image of leprechauns which bears little resemblance to anything found in the cycles of Irish folklore. Some argue that the popularised image of the leprechaun is little more than a series of stereotypes based on derogatory anti-Irish 19th-century caricatures.

Many Celtic music groups have used the term leprechaun as part of their naming convention or as an album title. Some popular forms of American music, including heavy metal, celtic metal, punk rock, and jazz, have also made use of the mythological character.

Famous leprechaun characters include:

- Lucky, the mascot of Lucky Charms cereal, created by General Mills
- The Notre Dame Leprechaun, official mascot of the Fighting Irish sports teams at the University of Notre Dame
- Lucky the Leprechaun, mascot of the Boston Celtics, who is featured on the team's logo
- Hornswoggle, a character created by professional wrestler Dylan Mark Postl, who competed under the persona for the majority of his WWE tenure
- The 1993 American horror slasher-film Leprechaun and its sequels feature a killer leprechaun portrayed by Warwick Davis.

Nobel Prize-winning economist Paul Krugman coined the term "leprechaun economics" to describe distorted or unsound economic data, which he first used in a tweet on 12 July 2016 in response to the publication by the Irish Central Statistics Office (CSO) that Irish GDP had grown by 26.3%, and Irish GNP had grown by 18.7%, in the 2015 Irish national accounts. The growth was subsequently shown to be due to Apple restructuring its double Irish tax scheme which the EU Commission had fined €13bn in 2004–2014 Irish unpaid taxes, the largest corporate tax fine in history. The term has been used many times since.

In the U.S., Leprechauns are often associated with St. Patrick's Day along with the color green and shamrocks.

=== Darby O'Gill ===
The Disney film Darby O'Gill and the Little People (1959)—based on Herminie Templeton Kavanagh's Darby O'Gill books—which features a leprechaun king, is a work in which Fergus mac Léti was "featured parenthetically". In the film, the captured leprechaun king grants three wishes, like Fergus in the saga.

While the film project was in development, Walt Disney was in contact with, and consulting Séamus Delargy and the Irish Folklore Commission, but never asked for leprechaun material, even though a large folkloric repository on such subject was housed by the commission. (Note: The Commission would have preferred the project be not about leprechauns, and Delargy was clearly of this sentiment. The commission's archivist Bríd Mahon also recalls suggesting as alternatives the heroic sagas like the Táin or the novel The Well at the World's End, to no avail.Tracy (2010), p. 48)

== See also ==
- Crichton Leprechaun
- Irish mythology in popular culture
- Leprechaun traps
- Mooinjer veggey
- Sleih beggey
