= Louis Feutren =

Former SS member and teacher (1922–2010)

Louis Feutren (1922–2009) was a former member of the Bezon Perrot Breton nationalist group, a collaborator with the Waffen-SS and a teacher of French.

== Life ==
=== Early life ===
Louis Feutren was born in 1922. As a young man he became interested in Celtic mysticism and the relationships between "true Celtic people" and the Celtic nations of Ireland, Scotland, Wales, Cornwall, the Isle of Man and Brittany. In the 1930s he became a member of the Bezen Perrot, a tiny Breton separatist movement which was agitating for separation from France to form a free Breton state

=== Occupation of France ===
During the occupation of France the Bezen Perrot group collaborated with the Waffen-SS. He and his unit guarded an interrogation centre in Rennes and wore SS uniforms. Feutren reached the rank of junior officer in the Oberscharführer unit.

=== Post liberation of France ===
After the war he and his entrire unit were sentenced to death for crimes against resistance fighters and Jews, but he fled and travelled to the Republic of Ireland via Wales.

He married Maura Martin in April 1956. He studied at University College, Galway, obtaining a Bachelor of Arts and a Diploma in Education.

=== Teaching ===
He taught French at St Conleth's College from 1957 to his retirement in 1985.

=== Death ===
He died in Bray, County Wicklow in November 2009.

== Controversies ==
=== National Library of Wales accepting bequest ===
In 2011 the National Library of Wales accepted an archive and a bequest worth £300,000 from the estate of Louis Feutren. A portion of the bequest was to be used to show the destructive effects of "war and fascism". Huw Lewis criticised the library for accepting the bequest.

=== University of Western Brittany refusing bequest ===
A €50,000 bequest to the University of Western Brittany to promote the Breton language was refused by the university, who cited his behaviour during World War 2 as the reason.

=== Campaign by former pupils ===
In 2023 Uki Goñi launched a campaign to shed light on the teacher's behaviour and the culture that excused it and his history. Uki Goñi had attended the school from 1968 to 1971. He learned on his first day that Feutren was a former Nazi.

The campaign also seeks an apology from the school for Freutren assaulting pupils. Kieran Owens attended the school from 1966 to 1974 and said of Feutren "No one would consider crossing Mr Freuten. He was a volcano ready to erupt at any moment. If there was any sort of transgression he would be very, very, very swift and violent. I witnessed him bashing a guy; the guy flew across the room.". Other pupils found him intimidating even after corporal punishment was abolished in Irish schools in 1982.

St. Conleth's issued a statement which Uki Goñi referred to as "a non-apology anchored more in 1970 than in 2023".

== See also ==
- Célestin Lainé - another Breton collaborator
- Albert Folens -Flemish collaborator
