= Tea caddy =

Receptacle to store tea

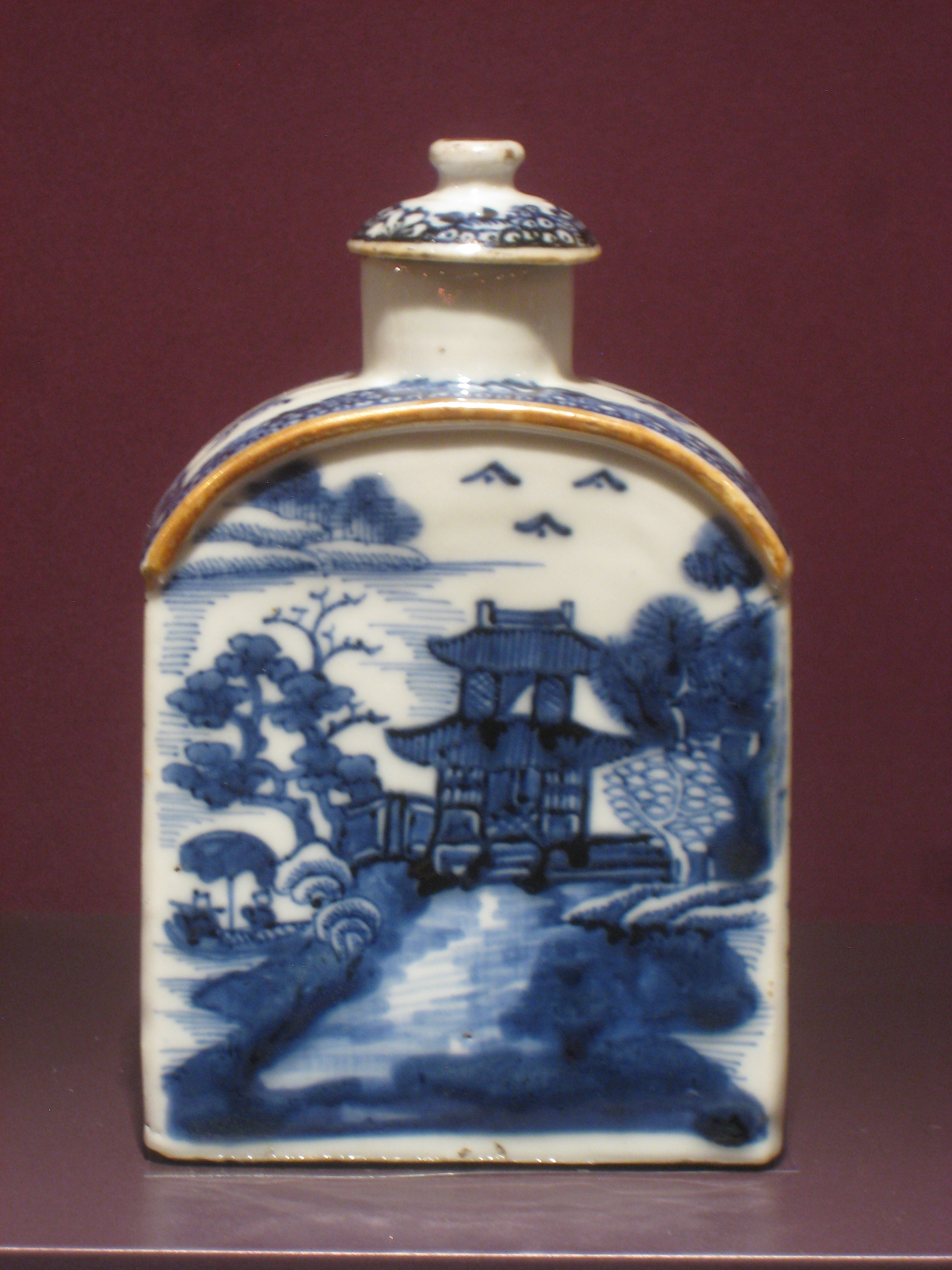
A Chinese porcelain tea caddy

A tea caddy is a box, jar, canister, or other receptacle used to store tea. When first introduced to Europe from Asia, tea was extremely expensive, and kept under lock and key. The containers used were often expensive and decorative, to fit in with the rest of a drawing-room or other reception room. Hot water was carried up from the kitchen, and the tea made by the mistress of the house, or under her supervision.

The word is believed to be derived from catty, the Chinese pound, equal to about a pound and a third avoirdupois. The earliest examples that came to Europe were of Chinese porcelain, and similar in shape to the ginger-jar. They had Chinese-style lids or stoppers, and were most frequently blue and white. Until about 1800, they were called tea canisters.

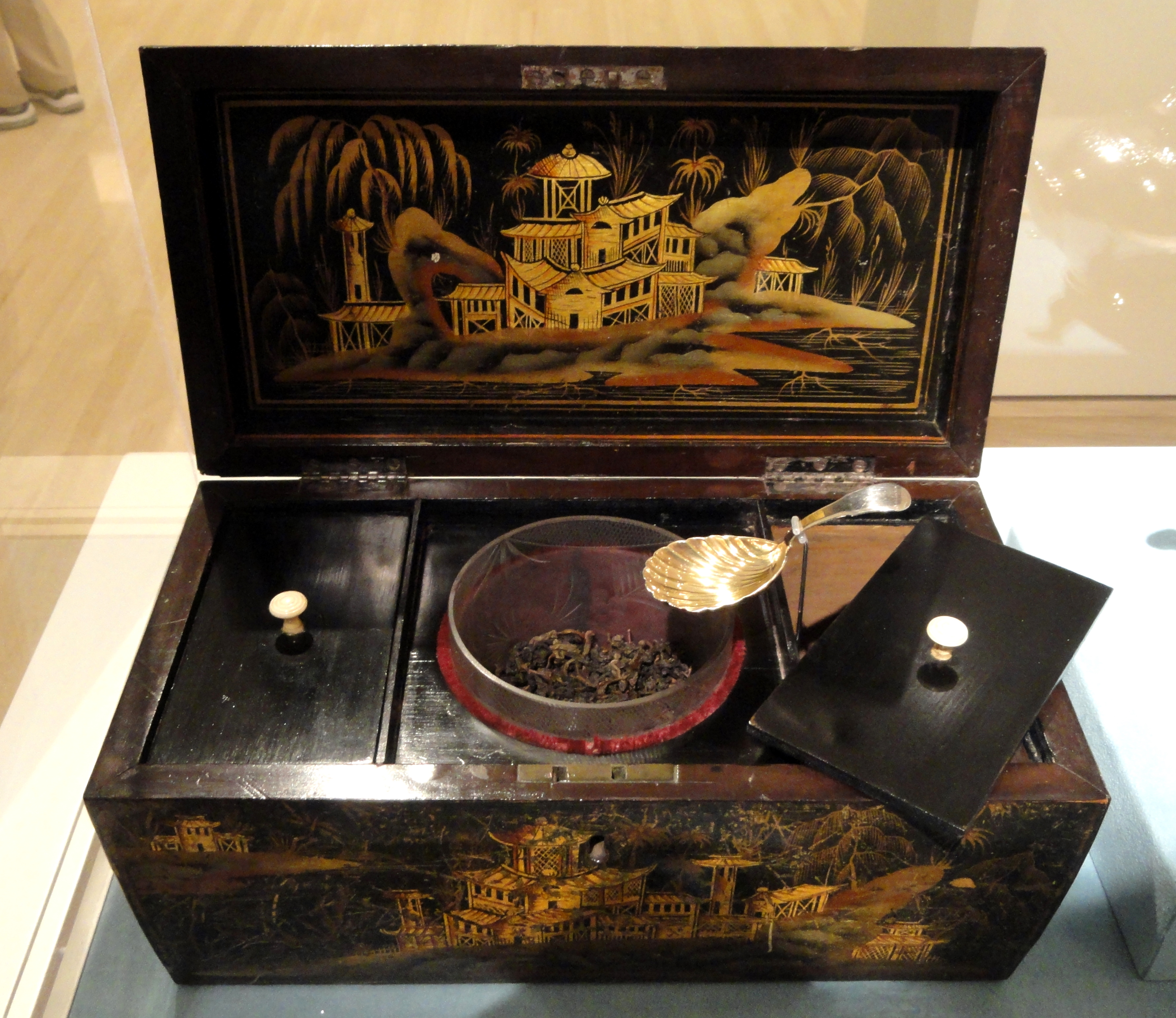
Chinese caddy set, c. 1780, with Western caddy spoon of 1805.

At first, English manufacturers imitated the Chinese, but quickly devised forms and ornaments of their own, and most ceramic factories in the country competed for the supply of the new fashion. Earlier tea caddies were made of either porcelain or faience. Later, designs had more variety in materials and decorations. Wood, pewter, tortoiseshell, brass, copper and silver were employed, but the material most frequently used was wood, and a number of Georgian box-shaped caddies in mahogany, rosewood, satin-wood and other timbers still survive. These were often mounted in brass and delicately inlaid, with knobs of ivory, ebony or silver. Many examples were made in Holland, principally of the earthenware of Delft. There were also many English factories producing high quality caddies. Soon the Western designs were also being made in Chinese export porcelain and its Japanese equivalent. The caddy spoon, typically in silver, was a wide shovel-like spoon for the tea, often with a scalloped bowl.

As the use of the jar waned and the box became more popular, the provision of different receptacles for green and black tea was abandoned, and the wooden tea chest or caddy, with a lid and a lock, was made with two and often three divisions for the actual caddies, the center portion being reserved for sugar. In the late 18th and early 19th century, caddies made from mahogany and rosewood were popular. The Chippendale company made caddies in the so-called Louis Quinze fashion, with claw-and-ball feet and exquisite finish. The designs of the wooden caddies were rich, the inlay simple and delicate, the form graceful and unobtrusive. Even when shaped like miniature sarcophagi, imitating the massive wine-coolers of the Empire style, with little claw feet and brass rings, they were regarded as pleasant.

The larger varieties were known as tea chests. This term was also applied to cube-shaped wooden crates used for exporting tea overseas; now, it denotes similar boxes chiefly associated with house removals.

As tea grew cheaper, there was less concern with the appearance of caddies, and as a result they fell out of use, as tea was kept in the kitchen.

== Gallery ==
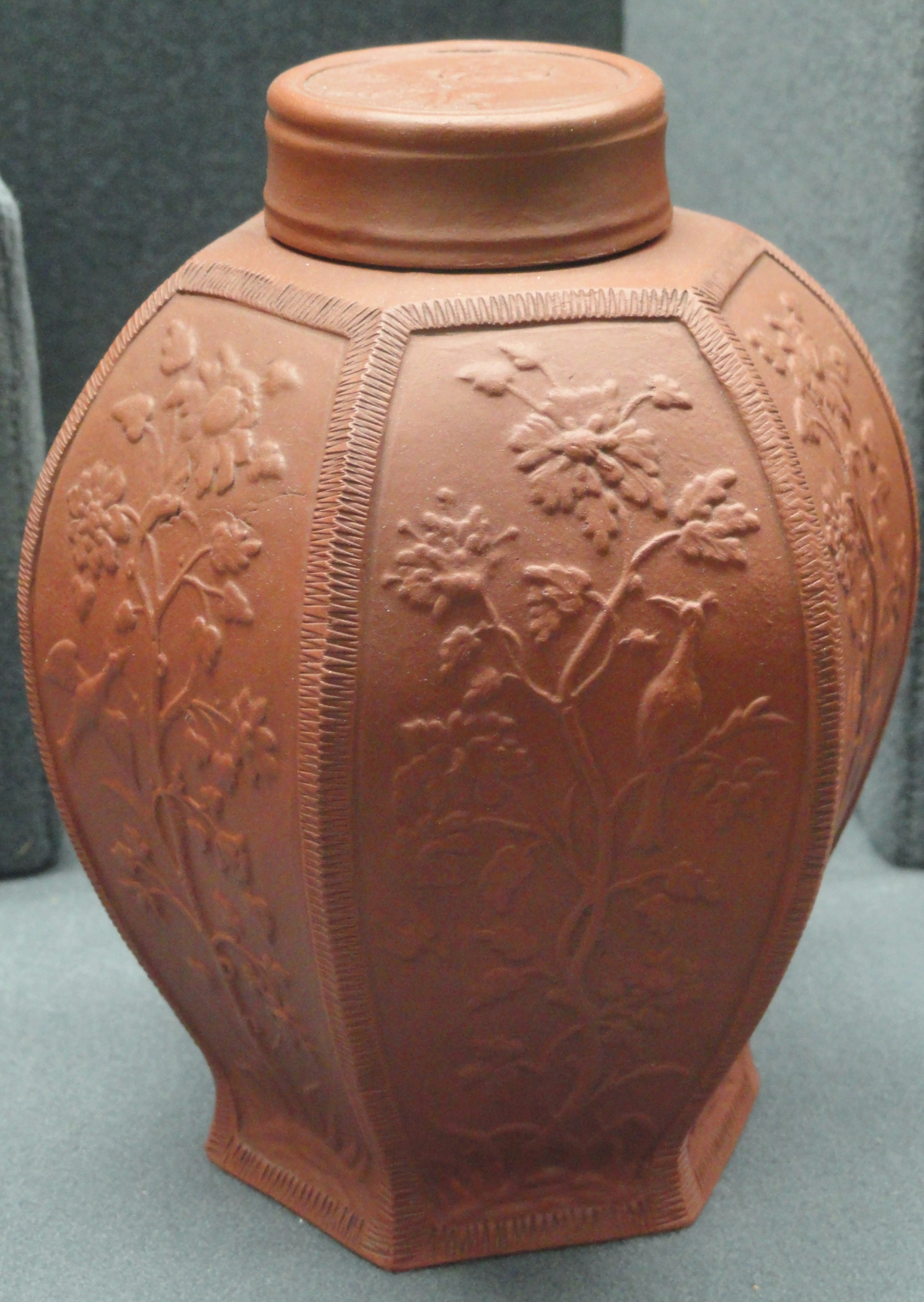
A red stoneware tea caddy from Meissen

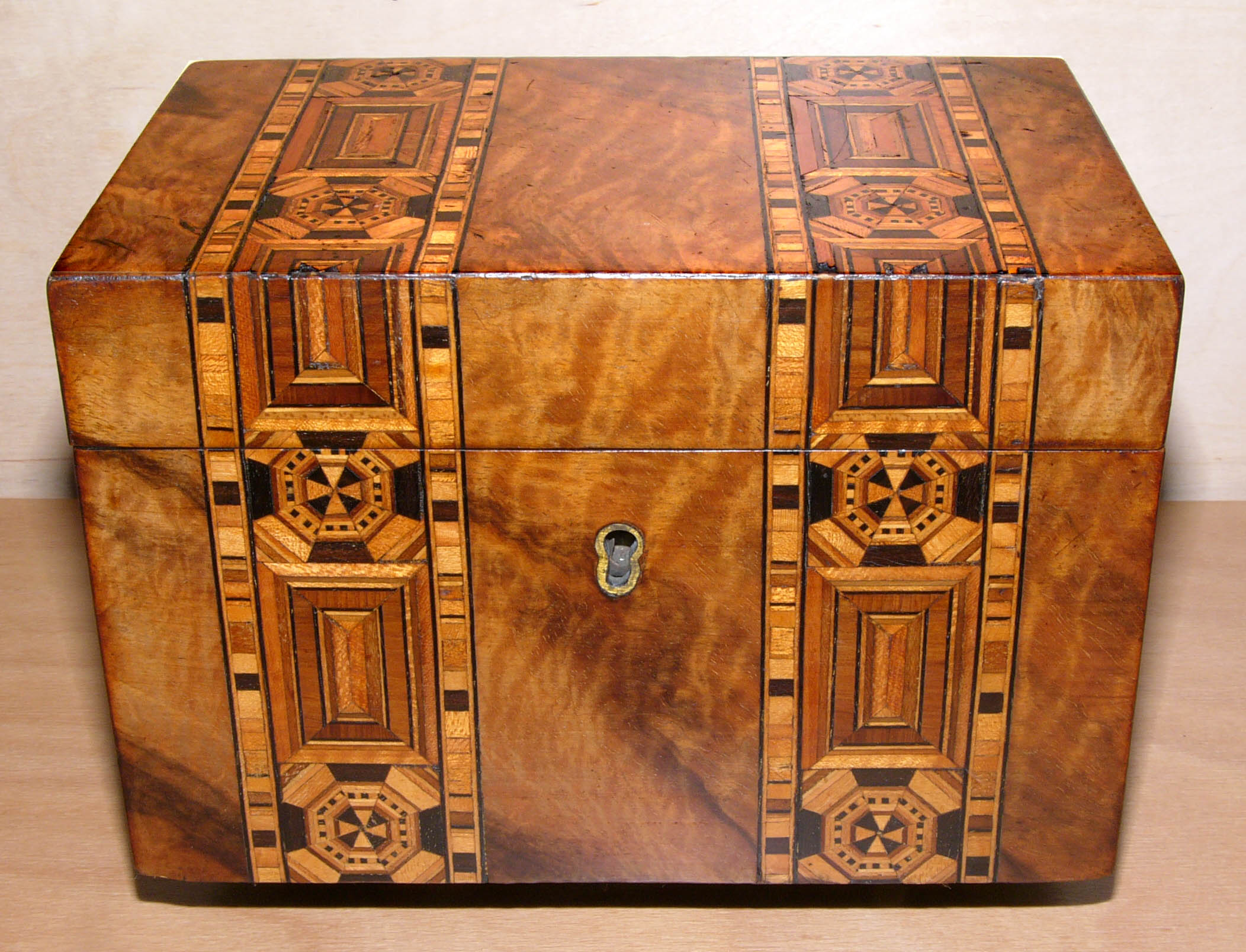
An English tea caddy decorated with wood inlay

A silver plated tea caddy and a caddy spoon

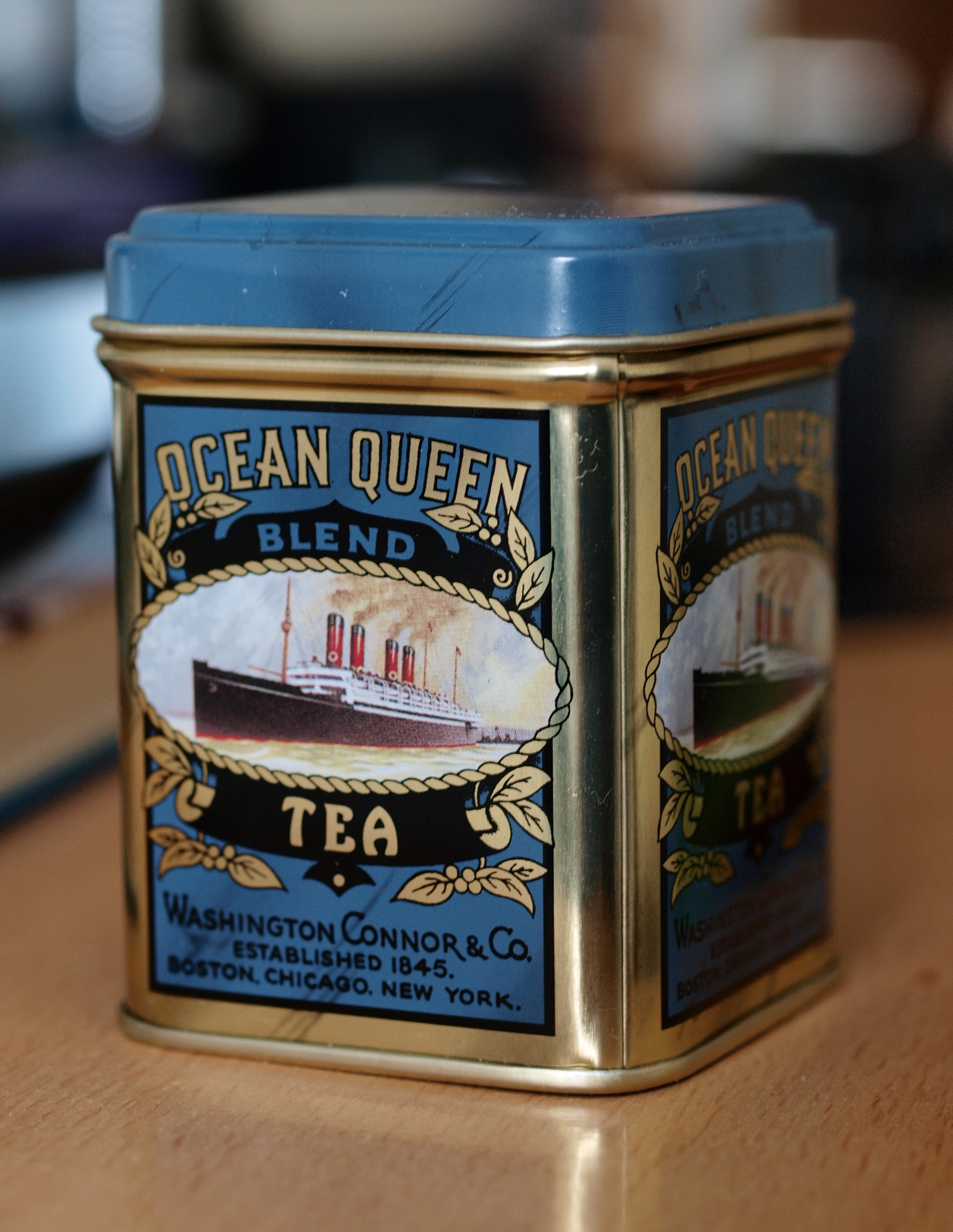
Ocean Queen old styled tea tin

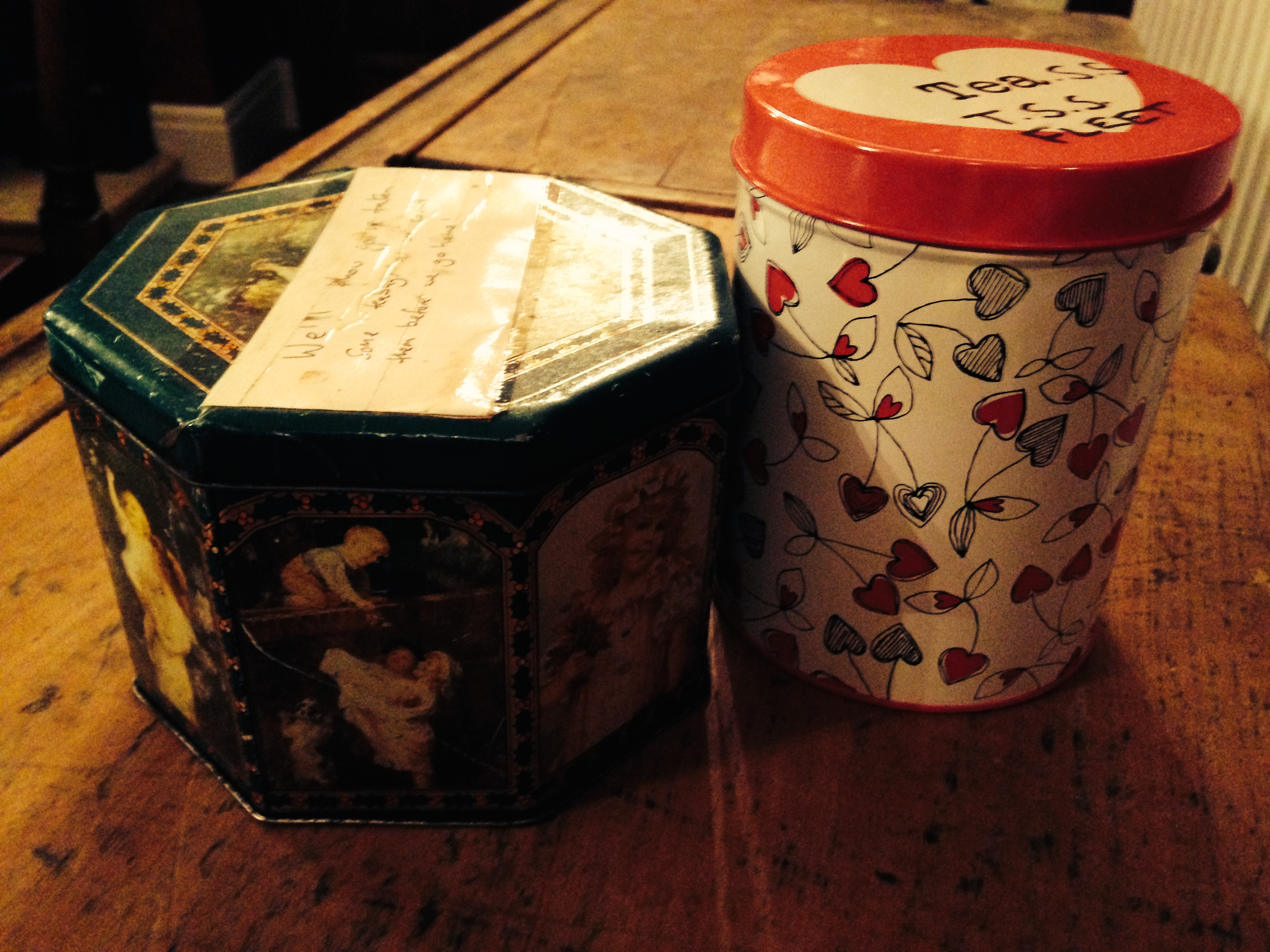
The LFB Fleet Teams Tea Caddies

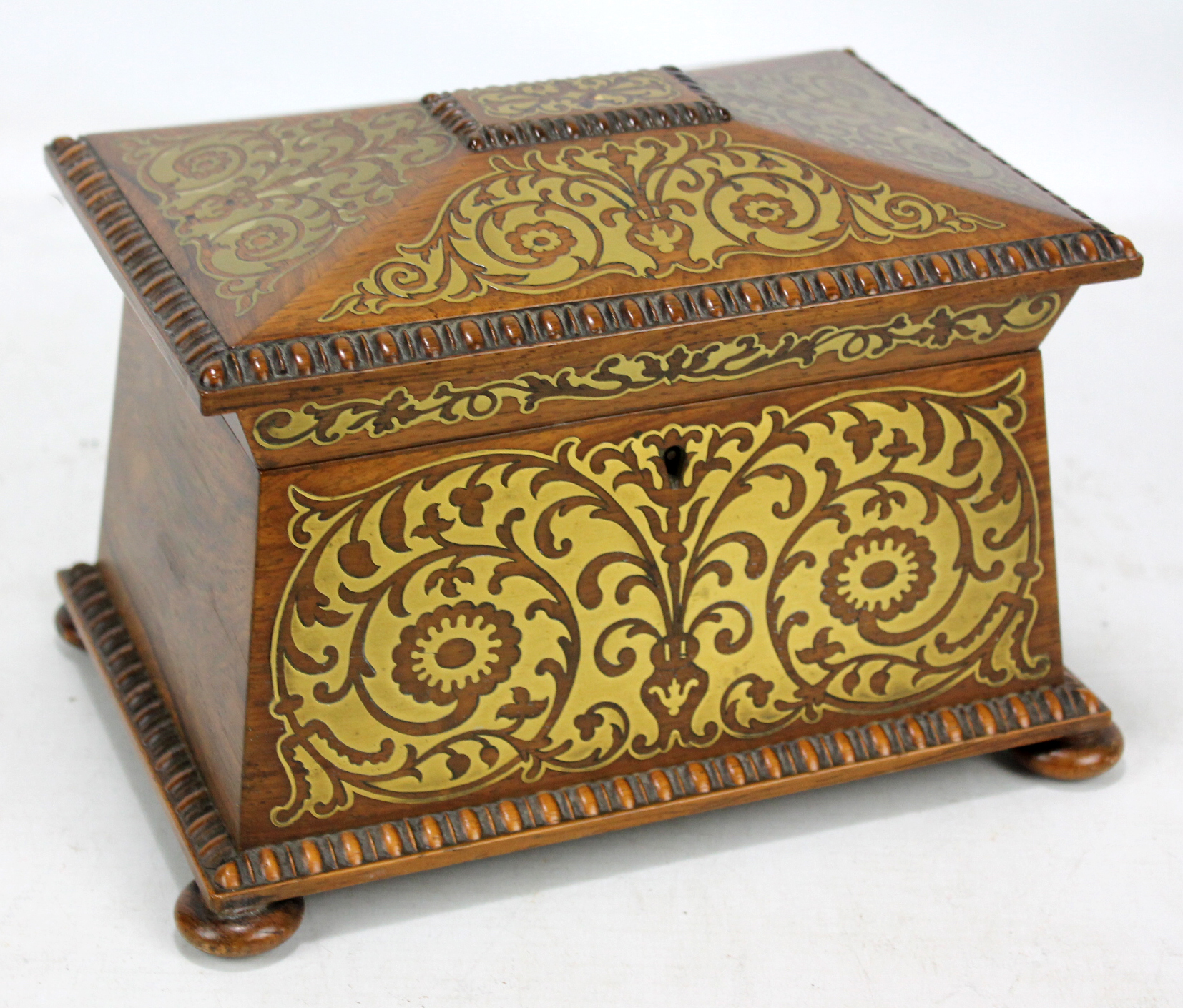
Early to mid-19th century rosewood and brass inlaid caddy

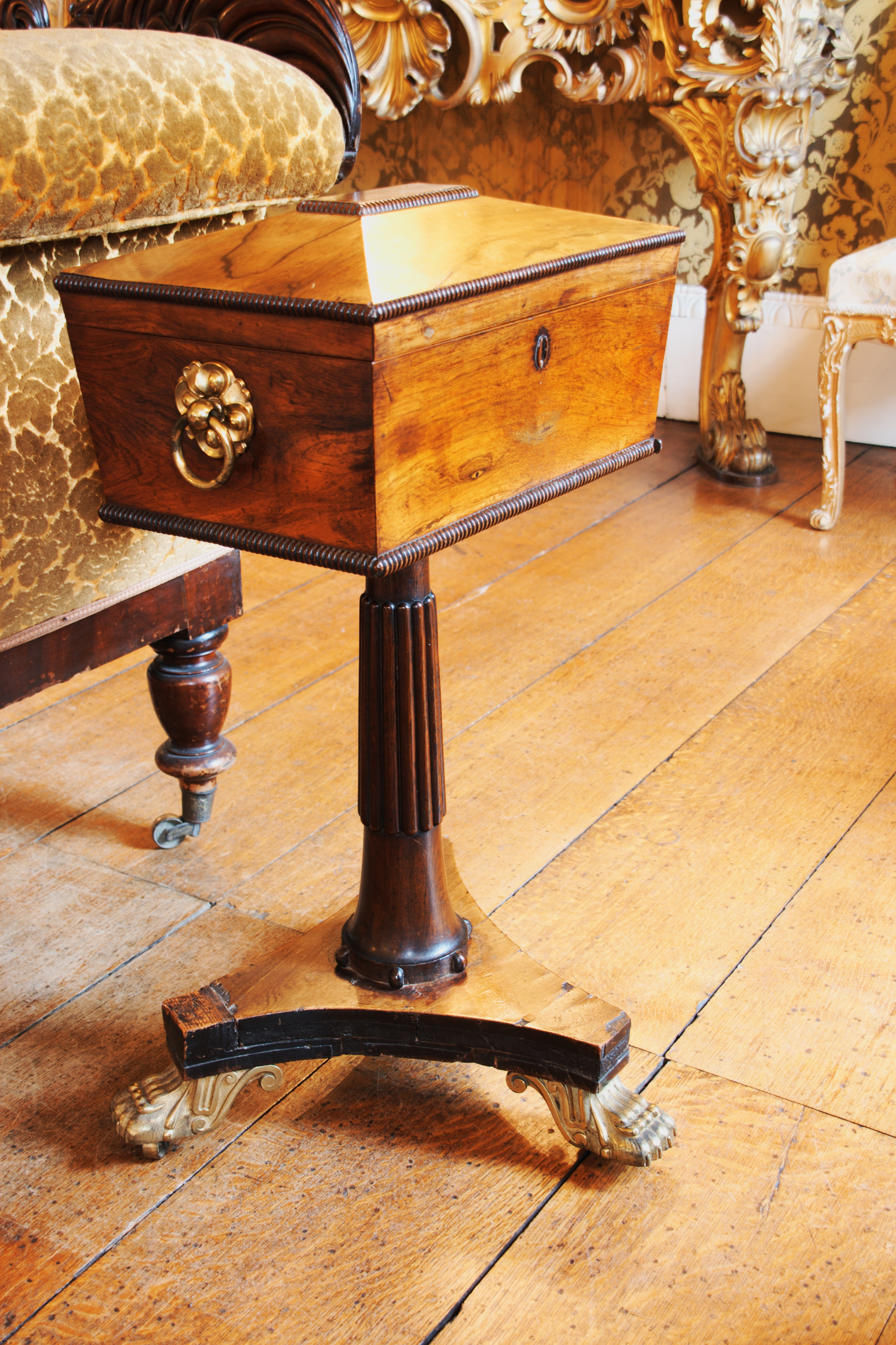
19th-century tea chest with its own stand

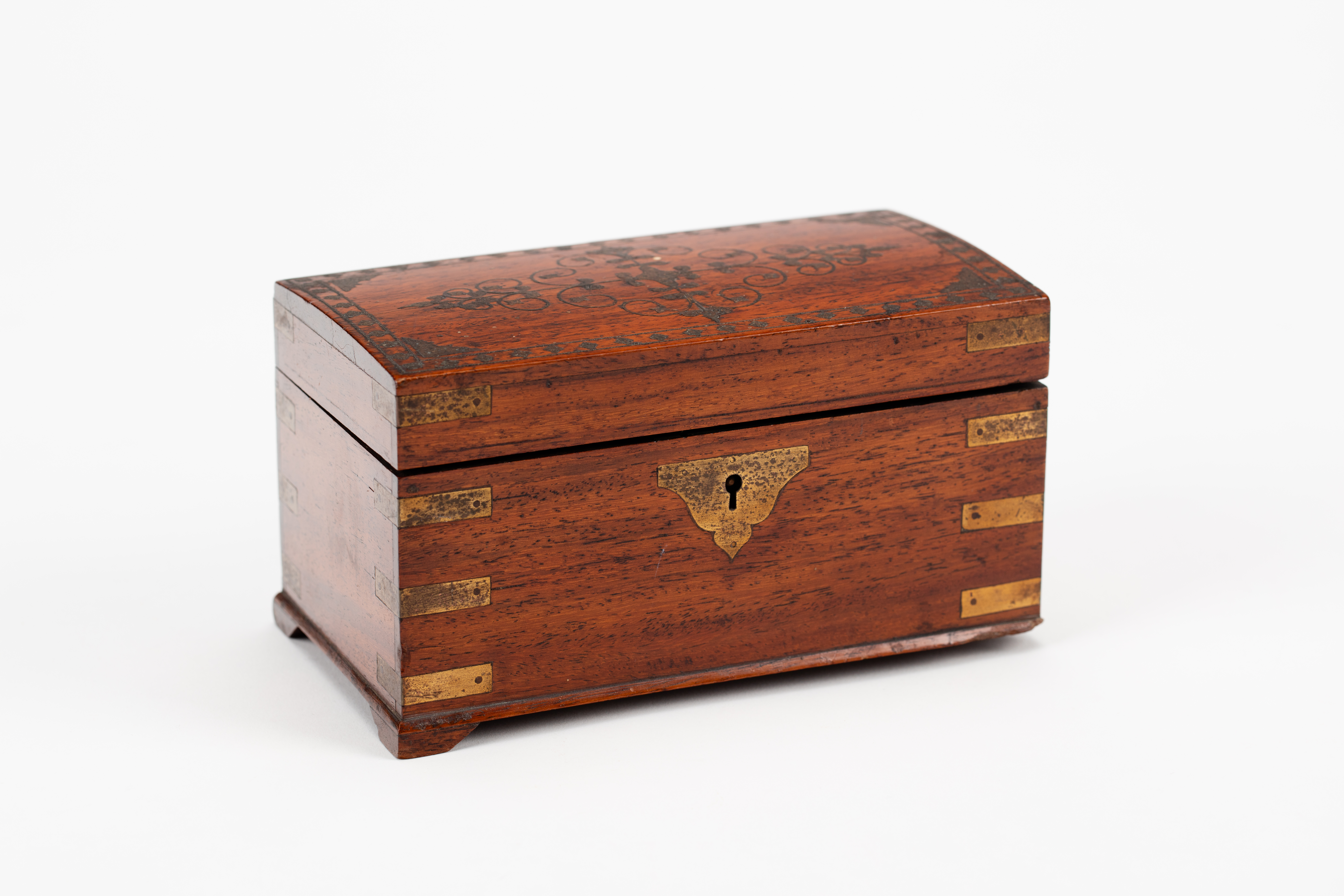
19th-century mahogany tea caddy

== See also ==
- Chaki
- Tea chest
- Tea culture
- Kaikado brand of hand-crafted Japanese tea caddies
