= Bríd Mahon =

Irish writer, journalist and folklorist

- Bríd Ní Mhathúna
- Mahon in 1966
- Born: 14 July 1918
- Died: 20 February 2008 (aged 89); Dublin, Ireland
- Occupations: folklorist, writer

Bríd Mahon (Irish: Bríd Ní Mhathúna, 14 July 1918 – 20 February 2008) was an Irish folklorist and writer, focussing on traditional food and clothing. She began her career as a child, writing a radio script on the history and music of County Cork for Radio Éireann. Hired to work as a typist for the Irish Folklore Commission, she remained there until its disbanding in 1970, simultaneously developing a second career as a journalist, serving as a theatre critic and writing the women's page for The Sunday Press. Her best-selling juvenile fiction, The Search for the Tinker Chief, was optioned by Disney. Though she was discouraged from publishing information collected on Irish folklore, she conducted research and published non-fiction works on Irish clothing and food, later working as a folklorist and lecturer at University College Dublin and then teaching at the University of California.

== Early life and family ==
Bríd Mahon was born on 14 July 1918. During her primary schooling in Dublin she began writing and submitted a script to Radio Éireann on the history and music of Cork. Subsequently, she submitted over 500 radio scripts to Radio Éireann and also wrote radio scripts for the BBC.

Her sister, Brenda Maguire, was an author, journalist and teacher, and wrote the agony column for the other main Irish Sunday paper, The Sunday Independent.

== Career ==
On 9 October 1939, Mahon was hired as a temporary stenographer and typist for the Irish Folklore Commission. Because the IFC operated a marriage bar, none of the full-time collectors were women and their opportunities were limited to administrative work. In 1947, she took over the bookkeeping and much of the office work from Máire MacNeill, who wanted to devote more time to cataloguing. Two years later, when MacNeill terminated her employment with the Commission in order to marry, Mahon was appointed in her place as the office manager. Though the Commission restricted private publishing activities of the staff and discouraged their participation in media activities, Mahon conducted her own archival research there and published articles and books on Irish clothing and food.

In the 1950s, in addition to her day job, Mahon worked as a theatre critic. Throughout the 1960s, she served as the women's editor of The Sunday Press. Through her work at the Commission and the paper, she befriended J. R. R. Tolkien on some of his trips to Dublin, famously introducing him to fish and chips soaked in vinegar. She interviewed The Beatles when they came to play their only Dublin concert at The Adelphi Cinema on Middle Abbey Street in 1963. On a trip to California in 1968, she met and talked with Robert F. Kennedy in Los Angeles airport as he arrived to address his supporters and she was en route back to Ireland. As her flight from the USA approached Dublin, the pilot announced that Kennedy had been assassinated. Mahon was rushed to the newspaper offices and wrote the front page story for the next day's edition.

The staff of the Commission were not considered civil service employees until a government ruling in 1959. Mahon was appointed to serve as the negotiator on behalf of the Commission's staff with the Department of Education and Finance to resolve their grievances on pay and pensions. The negotiations to convert the staff to civil servants was not concluded until 1965 and pension negotiations were on-going throughout the decade. Mahon served as the office manager, though from 1966 her title was "Secretary and Publications Officer", of the Commission until it was disbanded in 1970.

In 1971, she was appointed as a senior research lecturer at the University College Dublin in the Folklore Department. Mahon later taught at University of California at both the Berkeley and Los Angeles campuses.

Mahon's studies on food evaluated not only the history of what was eaten in Ireland, but also the superstitions surrounding various festivals and food. Author Kate Cone, described Mahon's 1991 book, Land of Milk and Honey: The Story of Traditional Irish Food and Drink as the "seminal book on the history of Irish food" and Rhona Richman Kenneally, former Chair of Concordia University's Department of Design and Computation Arts, called Mahon one of the "trailblazing" experts on Irish food. The book provided insight into how rich and varied the diet of common people was in the 17th century before industrialisation and land reforms brought about the Great Famine.

In 1998, Mahon wrote her memoirs, including many anecdotes about the work of the Commission. One story she relayed involved Walt Disney. In 1946, he contacted the Commission seeking ideas for a story on leprechauns. Though Séamus Ó Duilearga, director of the Commission, tried to interest Disney in more heroic folk figures, he was unsuccessful. In 1959, Darby O'Gill and the Little People premiered in Dublin and members of the commission who had helped gather information for the film, including Mahon, were given tickets to attend. Later, when her book The Search for the Tinker Chief (Figgis, 1968) became a juvenile fiction bestseller, it was optioned by Disney.

== Death and legacy ==
Mahon died at Leopardstown Park Hospital in Dublin on 20 February 2008 and was buried the following day at Mount Jerome Cemetery and Crematorium.

== Selected works ==
=== Fiction ===
- Mahon, Bríd (1947). Loo the Leprachaun and Báinín, the Cat, and Other Stories. Dublin: M.H. Gill & Son. OCLC 562678093.
- Mahon, Bríd (1968). The Search for the Tinker Chief. Dublin: Allen Figgis. OCLC 74766.
- Mahon, Bríd (1975). The Wonders Tales of Ireland. Tallaght: Folens. OCLC 810601132.
- Mahon, Bríd (1992). A Time to Love. Swords, Dublin: Poolbeg Press Ltd. ISBN 978-1-85371-221-0.
- Mahon, Bríd (1994). Devorgilla. Swords, Dublin: Poolbeg Press Ltd. ISBN 978-1-85371-352-1.

=== Non-fiction ===
- Mahon, Bríd (1976). Irish Food. Tallaght: Folens. OCLC 16369830.
- Mahon, Bríd (1976). Irish Dress. Tallaght: Folens. OCLC 23808493.
- Mahon, Bríd (1977). My Favourite Stories of Ireland. Guildford: The Lutterworth Press. OCLC 4549622.
- Mahon, Bríd (1981). Irish Folklore. Tallaght: Folens. OCLC 810790966.
- Mahon, Bríd (1991). Land of Milk and Honey: The Story of Traditional Irish Food and Drink. Swords, Dublin: Poolbeg Press Ltd. ISBN 978-1-85371-142-8.
- Mahon, Bríd (1998). While Green Grass Grows: Memoirs of a Folklorist. Cork: Mercier Press. ISBN 978-1-85635-206-2.
- Mahon, Bríd (2000). Rich & Rare: The story of Irish dress. Cork: Mercier Press. ISBN 978-1-85635-303-8.
