= Caddy spoon =

Spoon used for measuring dried tea leaves

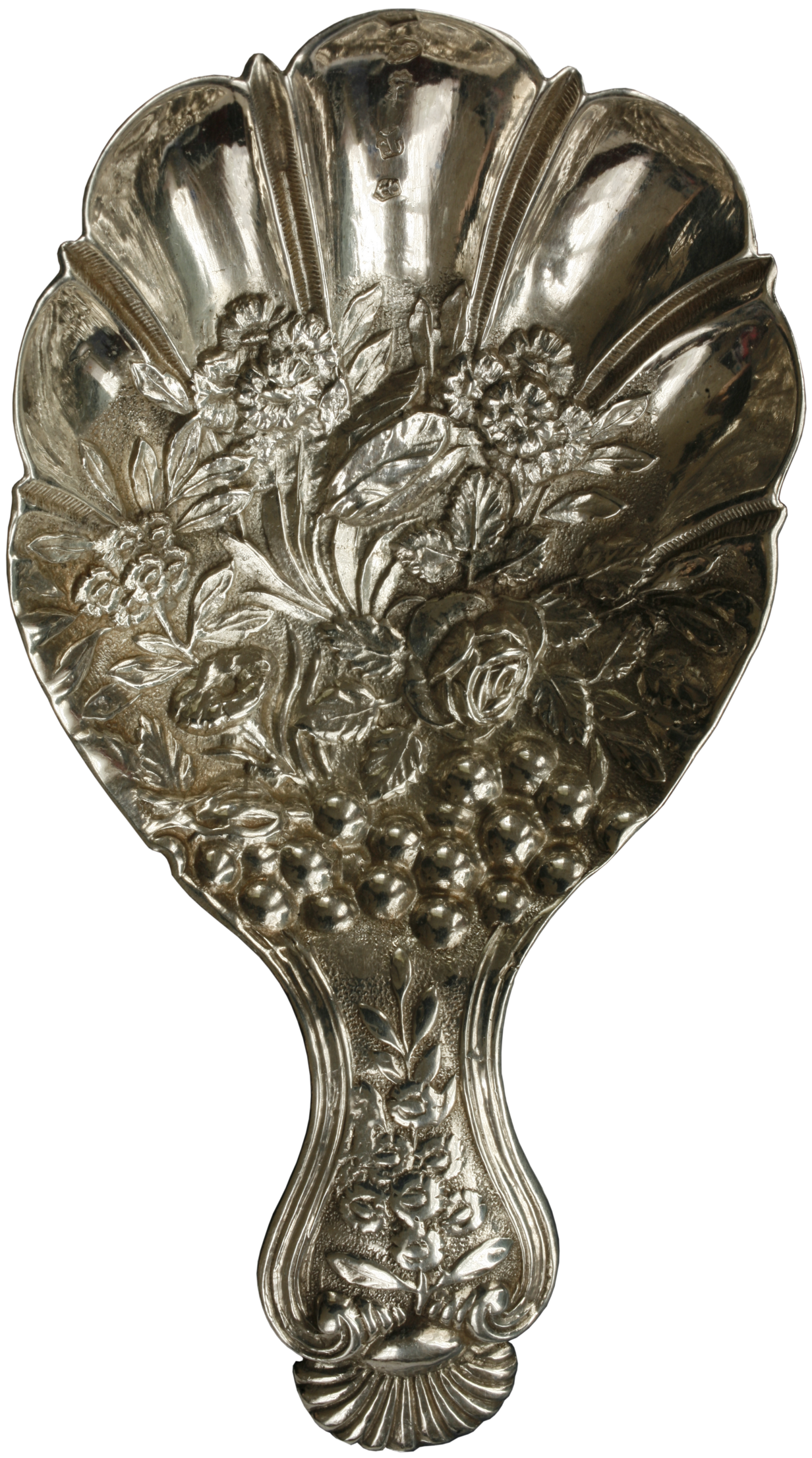
An ornate silver caddy spoon made in Birmingham, 1829. 77mm x 40mm

A caddy spoon is a spoon used for measuring out tea in the form of dried tea leaves. Traditionally made of silver, they became very popular at the end of the 18th century, when this relatively inexpensive utensil could be found in practically any middle class household. Tea was sometimes stored in elaborate boxes or containers called tea caddies, and these spoons were made to be used with such containers. The caddy spoons went out of fashion in the early 20th century.

== Design ==
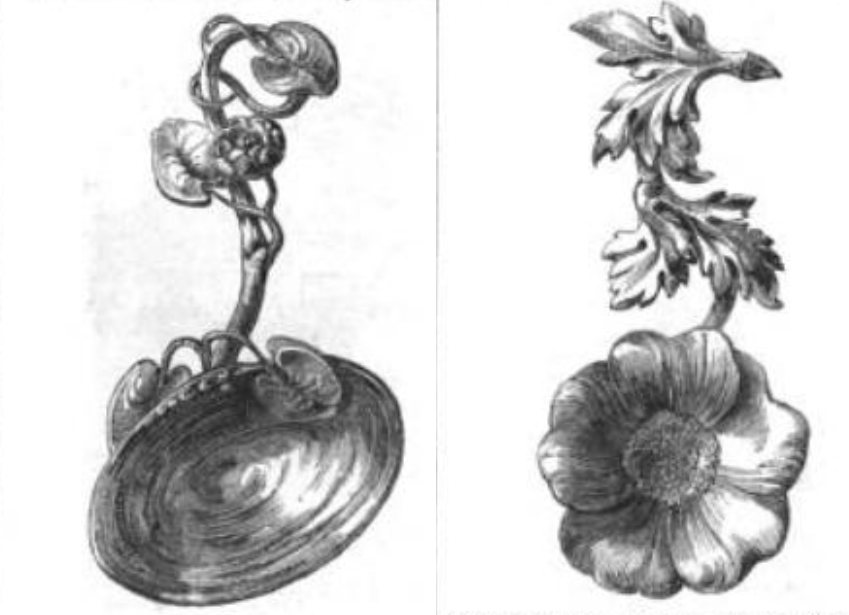
Silver caddy spoons by Francis Higgins of London, 1851. At the time these two were praised for their "simplicity"

In the early period of the tea trade, the chests with tea included scoops made of sea shells in order to take a sample for tasting. This inspired shell-shaped bowls typical for the caddy spoons.

Caddy spoon, with its shallow bowl and a fanciful stubby handle, resembles a scoop more than it does the other spoons. The silver caddy spoons can also be found in a variety of other designs, with bowls shaped like leaves, whimsical patterns, or made to resemble odd things like a huntsman's cup or a coal box, with almost all of them bearing silver hallmarks.

The earliest caddy spoons made in Sheffield had shell-shaped bowls inspired by the shell scoops included with the tea containers shipped from Asia. The early Birmingham spoons used a jockey-cap-shaped bowl.

== See also ==
- Tea caddy
- Teaspoon

== Bibliography ==
- John Norie, Caddy Spoons: An Illustrated Guide, John Murray Publishers Ltd, 1988
- Burgess, Frederick William (1921). "The Caddy Spoon". Silver: Pewter: Sheffield Plate. G. Routledge. p. 228. OCLC 1008290537.
- Fisher, Nick (March 2012). "The Great Exhibition of 1851: the struggle to describe the indescribable". Endeavour. 36 (1): 6–13. doi:10.1016/j.endeavour.2011.10.004. ISSN 0160-9327. PMID 22189357.
- Saunders, A.F. (July 1924). "The story of the spoon". The Metal Industry. 22 (1): 277–279.
- Von Drachenfels, Suzanne (8 November 2000). "The Spoon". The Art of the Table: A Complete Guide to Table Setting, Table Manners, and Tableware. Simon and Schuster. pp. 186–195. ISBN 978-0-684-84732-0.
