= St Conleth's College =

St. Conleth's College
- Coláiste Naomh Conléad

Location
- 28 Clyde Road, Ballsbridge, Dublin 4 Ireland; 53.3279°N 6.2407°W

Information
- Motto: Fide et Fortitudine (Latin for 'faith and courage')
- Established: 4 September 1939
- Principal: Angelina Hopkins
- Staff: 25 full-time teachers
- Enrollment: 325
- Website: stconleths.ie

St. Conleth's College is a private co-educational Catholic school in Ballsbridge, Dublin, founded on 4 September 1939 by Bernard Sheppard. As of 2025, the principal of the senior school was Angelina Hopkins.

== History ==
The school was named after Conleth, (450-519AD), a sixth-century Irish monk who was a moulder of precious metals whose feast day is 4 May. The senior school, which has over 300 pupils and 25 teaching staff, is co-educational. The junior school has about 160 pupils and is also co-educational.

In November 2017, the Kevin Kelleher Wing was opened, adding a performance room and study area on top of the gymnasium. Kelleher (1921-2016), a former international rugby referee, was the headmaster of the school for over 46 years.

== Academics ==
The school was ranked first in the Irish fee-paying schools league table in 2003.

== Sport ==
Rugby is considered the primary sport of the school, and both Junior and Senior Cup Teams are represented in the Leinster Cups. Leinster Rugby focused on rugby in St. Conleth's in 2016 to recognise its successes that year.. St Conleths are the current McMullan Shield winners.

St. Conleth's won the Basketball Ireland National Cup and League double in 2009 at the U16 Boys B level. The school has also won several South Dublin Basketball League Championships, most recently in 2013.

St. Conleth's offers fencing as a school sport for both boys and girls from a young age. Former alumni have been instrumental in developing fencing in Ireland as well as representing Ireland in fencing at the Olympics, World and European championships.

The school also offers hockey, tennis and athletics.

== Debating ==
In 2014, three Conlethians represented Ireland at the World Schools Debating Championship in Bangkok, Thailand. In 2019, St. Conleth's had two winners in the grand final of the Irish Times Debate, with Kevin Roche (Kings Inns) winning the individual competition and Daniel Gilligan (TCD Hist Society) the team competition, while another former pupil, Conor White, was also a finalist.

== Controversy ==
Louis Feutren, a Nazi fugitive sentenced to death, taught French at the school from 1957 to 1985. The school stated it had profound regret for this, and expressed shock over the allegations.

== Alumni ==
- John M. Kelly (1931-1991) - Fine Gael politician
- Uki Goñi (b.1953) - Argentine author
- John Bouchier-Hayes (b.1944) - Irish Olympic fencer
