= Uki Goñi =

Argentine journalist and historian (born 1953)

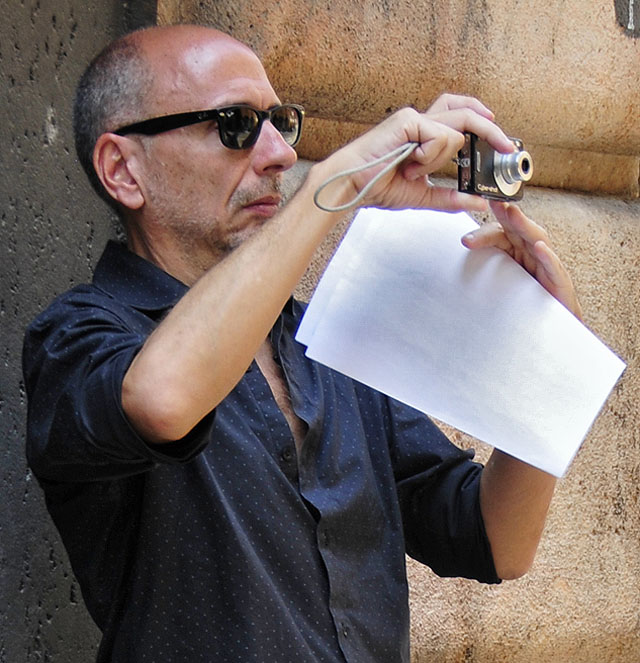
- Goñi in 2009
- Born: 17 October 1953 (age 72); Washington D.C., U.S.
- Occupations: Historian; writer

Uki Goñi (born 17 October 1953) is an Argentine author and historian. His research focuses on the role of the Vatican, Swiss authorities and the government of Argentina in organizing "ratlines"—escape routes for Nazi war criminals and collaborators.

== Personal life ==
Goñi was born on 17 October 1953 in Washington, D.C., and was raised in the United States, Argentina, Mexico, and Ireland. In Ireland, he was educated at St Conleth's College, where one of his schoolteachers was Louis Feutren. Feutren was a former member of the Bezen Perrot and a "boastful, unrepentant and proud" former officer of the SS by Goñi's account. In 2023, Goñi and other past pupils sent a letter to the St Conleth's board of management stating that Feutren abused and humiliated the students he taught, with Goñi writing that "I was physically bashed by Feutren during my first days there. It was the start of many beatings I myself received and that I witnessed Feutren inflict upon others". The group of past pupils requested that the school's board of management acknowledge and apologize for Feutren's behaviour.

Goñi has lived in Buenos Aires since 1975.

== Investigations ==
Drawing on investigations in Argentine, Swiss, American, British, and Belgian government archives, as well as numerous interviews and other sources, Goñi's conclusions are detailed extensively in The Real Odessa: Smuggling the Nazis to Perón's Argentina (Note: Granta Books, 2002, ISBN 1-86207-581-6) and several follow-up books. He also wrote an article for The Guardian in which scientific testing on a skull fragment put into question the authenticity of mainstream accounts of the death of Adolf Hitler.

Goñi is also well known for his reporting on the crimes of Argentina's 1976–1983 military dictatorship while he worked at the Buenos Aires Herald newspaper during those years, and as a witness in two of the trials against former officers of the dictatorship.

== Repercussions ==
The Real Odessa: Smuggling the Nazis to Perón's Argentina, originally published in London in 2002 and since then translated into Spanish, Italian, Slovenian, Portuguese, Polish and German, has had wide repercussions in those countries through which Nazi criminals and their collaborators passed in their escape, especially in Italy, the Netherlands, and Argentina. Following publication of the book in Italy, a group of parliamentarians in Rome demanded that Prime Minister Berlusconi open an investigation into the passage of Nazis through their country.

In Genoa, archbishop Tarcisio Bertone distributed 50,000 copies of a "Special Edition" of "Settimanale Cattolico" ("Catholic Weekly") announcing the creation of a special commission of inquiry to investigate Goñi's revelations regarding the role of the Genoese curia in aiding the flight of Nazi war criminals through the port city. In the Netherlands, KLM opened an internal investigation following the book's unearthing of documents regarding the use of the airline by Nazi officers after the war.

== Other works ==
Goñi writes for The New York Times, The New York Review of Books, The Guardian, and Time. He has also written for various publications in Argentina.

He is also the author of two previous books in Spanish, El infiltrado, la verdadera historia de Alfredo Astiz, (Note: Sudamericana, Buenos Aires 1996) regarding crimes committed by Argentina's 1976–83 military dictatorship, and Perón y los alemanes, (Note: Sudamericana, Buenos Aires 1998) on wartime links between Berlin and Buenos Aires.

== Music ==
Goñi is also a musician. He formed his first band, Space Age Serenity, while growing up in Dublin. In Argentina he has played and recorded with major artists such as folk musician Peteco Carabajal, the rock band Mancha de Rolando, blues guitarist Claudio Gabis, pop singer Adrián Dárgelos as well as with his own long-time band Los Helicópteros.

== Books ==
- The Real Odessa
- El Infiltrado. La verdadera historia de Alfredo Astiz, Editorial Sudamericana, Buenos Aires, 1996
- Perón y los Alemanes, Editorial Sudamericana, Buenos Aires, 1998
