= Leprechaun trap =

Children's craft project

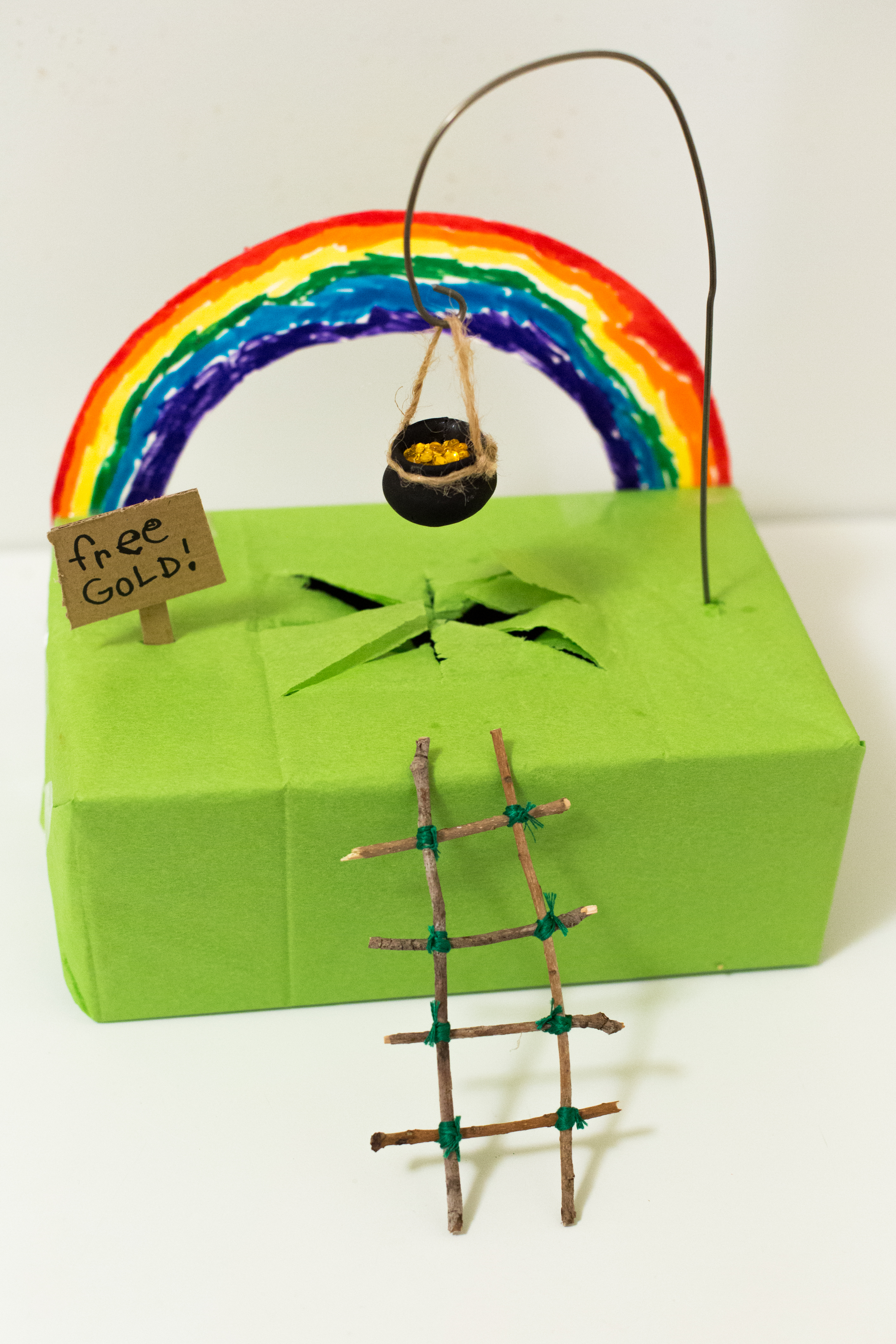
A leprechaun trap

A leprechaun trap is a children's craft project used to celebrate Saint Patrick's Day in the United States. The traps are traditionally made by young children and set out the night before St. Patrick's Day. The following morning, the children awaken to discover signs that leprechauns (mythical creatures from Irish legends) have visited the trap. After the children go to sleep, parents add signs of a leprechaun visiting, such as chocolate coins or treasure left in their bottom drawers, and pretend that a leprechaun did it.

The traps are typically made out of common, inexpensive household items, such as cardboard boxes, tin cans, or paper. The traps are typically green and gold and decorated with stereotypical leprechaun items: gold coins, rainbows, a top hat, and shamrocks.

Leprechaun traps can also be run as a school project, where kindergarten and first grade pupils construct traps at school and arrive on St Patrick's Day to find that the leprechaun has "sprung" them but escaped, leaving behind chocolate coins and glitter.

The tradition is largely unknown in Ireland.

== Similar traditions ==
Leprechaun trapping has been compared to the modern US tradition of leaving cookies out for Santa Claus on Christmas Eve. Similar to The Elf on the Shelf, the project is coordinated by parents or caregivers.
