= Folens (Irish publishers) =

Irish educational publishing company

Folens Publishing Company Unlimited Company
- Founded: 1958; 67 years ago in Dublin, Ireland
- Founder: Albert Folens
- Headquarters: Dublin, Ireland
- Products: Textbooks, workbooks, teacher guides, and digital learning platforms
- Owner: Folens family
- Website: www.folens.ie

Folens is a major company in Irish educational publishing. It was founded by Albert Folens.

== Atlas and British Isles ==
In October, 2006, Folens announced that the new edition of Folens' atlas would no longer use the term "British Isles" in the new edition of its atlas, to be introduced the following January. According to the Irish Times, "John O'Connor of Folens insisted he had received no complaints from parents regarding the new atlas. The issue had, however, been brought to his attention by a geography teacher."
