= Albert Folens =

Belgian-born Irish publisher

- Born: Albert Joseph Marcel Folens; 15 October 1916; West Flanders, Belgium
- Died: 9 September 2003 (aged 86); County Wicklow, Ireland
- Known for: Publisher of educational books in Ireland

Albert Joseph Marcel Folens (15 October 1916 – 9 September 2003) was a Belgian-born publisher of educational materials. His company, Folens, is a major publisher of educational materials. He was also the author Aiséirí Flóndrais ('The Resurrection of Flanders') a book in Irish discussing the fortunes and rise of Flanders and of the Dutch language vis-à-vis French in Flanders, with references to the situation of the Irish language.

== Early life and education ==
He was born in Bissegem in Kortrijk, West Flanders. His family were devout Catholics who spoke Flemish. He attended a Catholic boarding school then entered a De La Salle novitiate. He left the novitiate in 1939 before taking final vows, which led to a permanent break with his family.

== Flemish nationalist involvement ==
One account says that he left the novitiate in protest over the order teaching Flemish children through French. Folens claimed that the novel The Lion of Flanders by Hendrik Conscience had inspired his devotion to Flemish identity in childhood.

=== Allegations of Nazi Collaboration ===
Folens joined the Flemish Legion in 1941 which was a nationalist Flemish group of collaborators. They hoped that collaborating with the Third Reich would lead to a Flemish state. During the Second World War they were incorporated under the SS. At this point Folens and the captain of the Flemish legion refused to make an oath to Hitler, based on their previous allegiance to the King of Belgium, insisting that the legion would only fight for Flemish independence against the Walloons. Before going into battle, Albert Folens returned to Belgium and worked as a translator. After the war, being named on the CROWCASS list of suspected collaborators, he was sentenced by a Belgian court to 10 years imprisonment. He alleged that he had only worked as a translator. He escaped from jail after 30 months and made his way to Ireland with his wife Juliette.

=== Hidden History: Ireland's Nazis ===
A two-part documentary series shown on RTÉ revealed his alleged collaboration with the Third Reich. (The first part was broadcast on RTÉ 1 on 7 January 2007, the second on 16 January). Juliette Folens, his widow, obtained a temporary High Court injunction to prevent the use of a 1987 interview with her husband on an ex parte basis. The interview had been taken twenty years previously but did not provide information that proved the accusations that he was a member of the Gestapo. Had they been published when Mr. Folens was alive, they would have been considered defamatory.

Under Irish law, one cannot defame a person after their death and Folens was not alive at the time the documentary was released. His family issued a press release denying that he had ever been involved with Nazi war crimes, although he was a member of the Flemish Legion.

== Personal life ==
After returning to Brussels in 1942 he met his future wife Juliette in March 1942. They married in April 1942 and would have two daughters and a son.

== Post World War II ==
He was captured by British forces in Germany at the end of the war and repatriated to Belgium, where he was sentenced to ten years imprisonment for collaboration. His wife was sentenced to imprisonment for two years but was released after six months. After thirty-one months imprisonment Albert escaped imprisonment under unclear circumstances.

Folens arrived in Ireland in October 1948 on a false passport and Juliette joined him afterward. He had his sentence reduced to the three years he had served, had his Belgian passport restored, and was able to travel to Belgium. As his earlier teaching regulations were not recognised in Ireland, he obtained a H.Dip.Ed. from University College Dublin in 1951. Alan Dukes was one of his pupils.

In 1957, he and his wife began printing school notes on a hired Mimeograph. In 1960, he retired from teaching to devote himself to publishing, founding the Folens Educational Publishing Company. The company was based at Scholarstown Road, then Naas Road, then moved to Tallaght.

In 1978, he began to retire. In 1984, the Folens family were held hostage by robbers who demanded a ransom. In 2001, he suffered a stroke and moved to the Dargle Valley Nursing Home, Enniskerry, where he died.
