= Kaikado =

Company located in Kyoto, Japan

- Industry: hand-crafted metalware
- Founded: 1875 in Kyoto
- Founder: Seisuke Yamamoto
- Products: metal canisters and tea caddies
- Website: https://www.kaikado.jp/english/

Kaikado is a company located in Kyoto, Japan that manufactures and sells hand-made metal canisters and tea caddies. The items have been made by members of the Yagi family for six generations.

The company manufactures tea canisters called chazutsu in Japanese (cha is the Japanese word for tea, zutsu for canister) out of copper, brass or tin, using designs that have not changed since the company opened in 1875. One important feature of the canisters is the tight fit between the lid and the container, ensuring it remains airtight, to ensure the tea contained inside stays fresh.

The workshop is located beside the Kamo River in a quiet alley in Kyoto. The hand-manufacturing process involves 130 to 140 steps, using a process that has remained unchanged since the company opened. Many of the dies and molds used today from the early years of the company.

== Company history ==
The company opened in 1875, when Japan first opened to the world, allowing for the import of items such as tin from England for the first time. At the time, tea canisters were made of ceramic or earthenware. The metal canisters were considered revolutionary for the time, as they kept air out due to their double-walled construction and tight-fit lid. Their construction allowed the tea leaves to retain their flavor and quality for up to a year. The canisters appear straight, but have a slight bulge, a feature, that improves airtightness and a lid that slides shut by itself, owing to the precision of manufacture.

== Products and Manufacturing ==
In 2022, the company's workshop employs a team of eight full-time artisans, most having an art school background; with office staff, the company employs 15 people. The family-run business is currently run by Takahiro Yagi (a sixth generation descendant of founder Kiyosuke) who works with his father Seiji and the other craftspeople in the shop. The skills are not formally taught to the craftsman, instead they learn by being shown how to work the metal; they develop the skills on their own by making the items one at a time.

Yagi can produce around 10 canisters a day, and the company makes around 40 canisters a day. The company also makes copper tea pots, first made in collaboration with Danish studio OEO. The collaboration was meant to update products or create new ones for an international market; Kaikado was one of six Japanese companies involved in the process. OeO “tweaked the basic shapes and designed a range that includes various jugs, containers and serving trays made from brass, copper and wood” as part of the collaboration.
