= Jockey's cap =

Headgear worn during horse racing

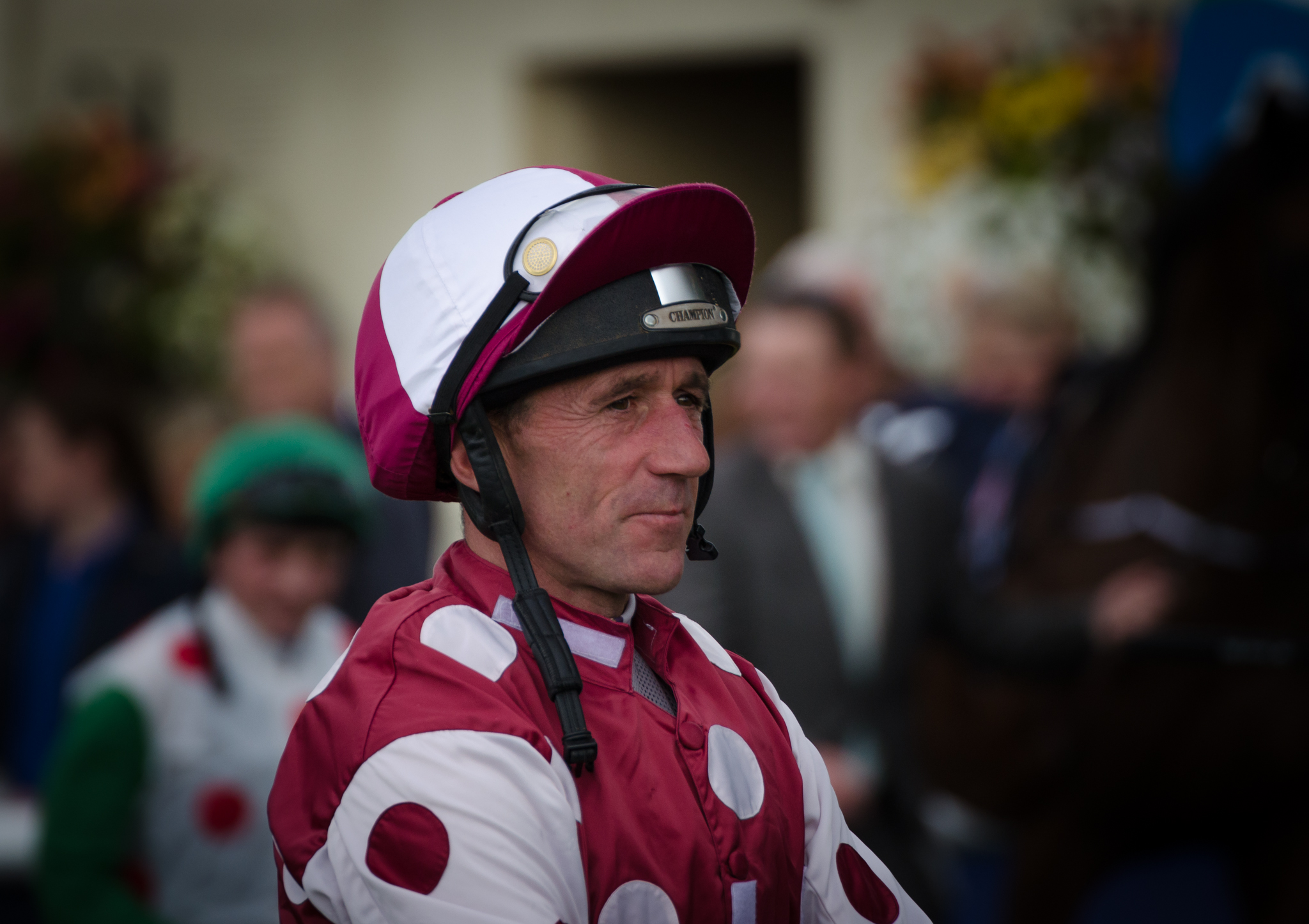
A jockey's cap, worn over an equestrian helmet, at races in Dublin in 2014.

A jockey's cap is the headgear worn by a jockey in the sport of horse racing. The modern jockey's cap forms part of a jockey's "silks" or racing colours and is worn over a protective equestrian helmet.

== History ==
The first form of jockey's cap appeared in the late 17th century and was generally made of velvet with a peak or visor and a hatband fastened at the front with a buckle. This early style of cap is preserved in the "State Dress" of the musicians of the Household Cavalry, who adopted it at the behest of Queen Victoria. During the 19th century, a lighter version began to be worn by racing jockeys; it was made of silk in the colours representing the jockey's stable. Modern jockey's caps are made oversized so that they can be worn over a protective helmet.

== Gallery ==
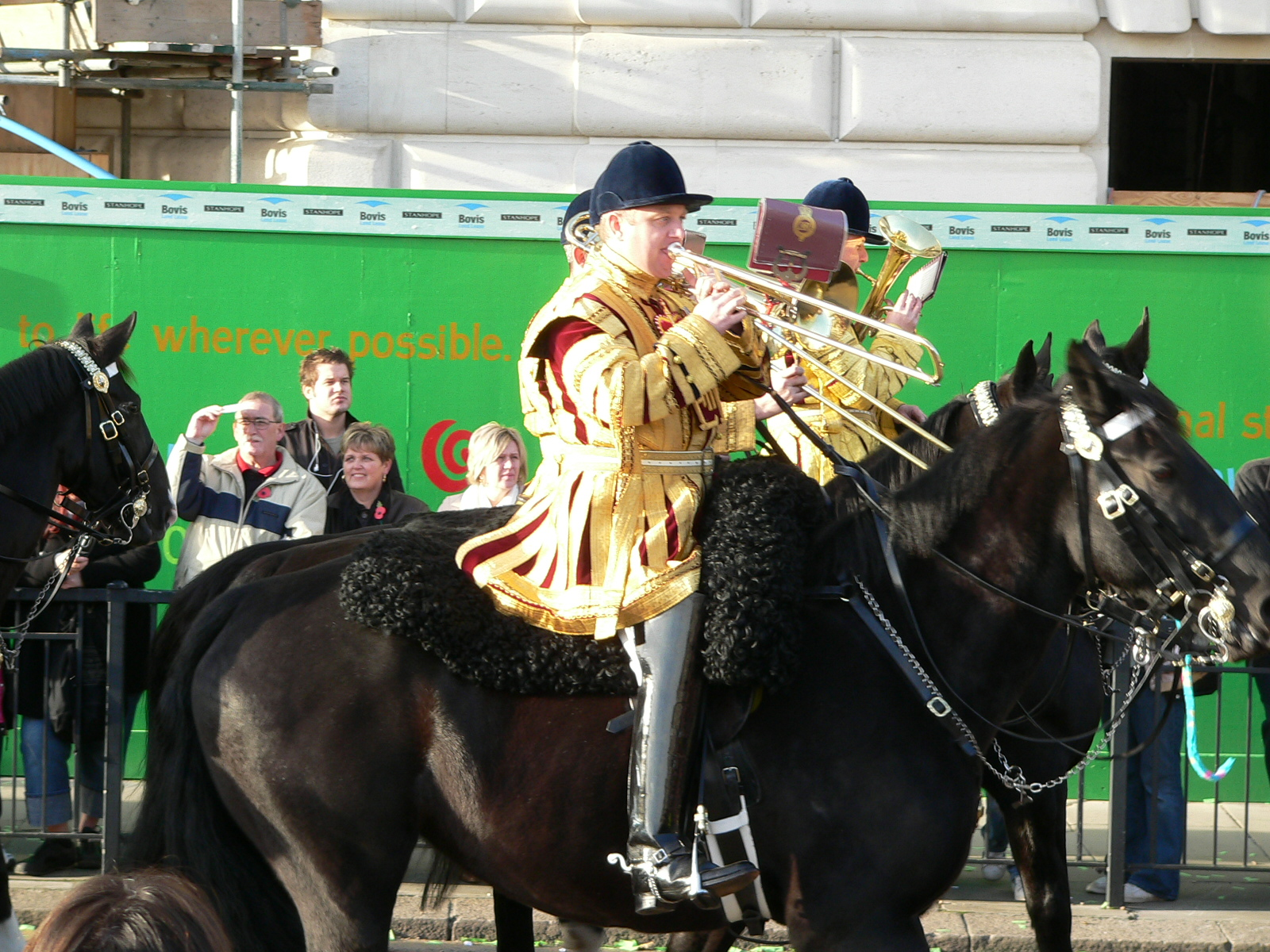
Bandsmen of the Household Cavalry mounted band in state dress, wearing the traditional style of velvet jockey's cap.

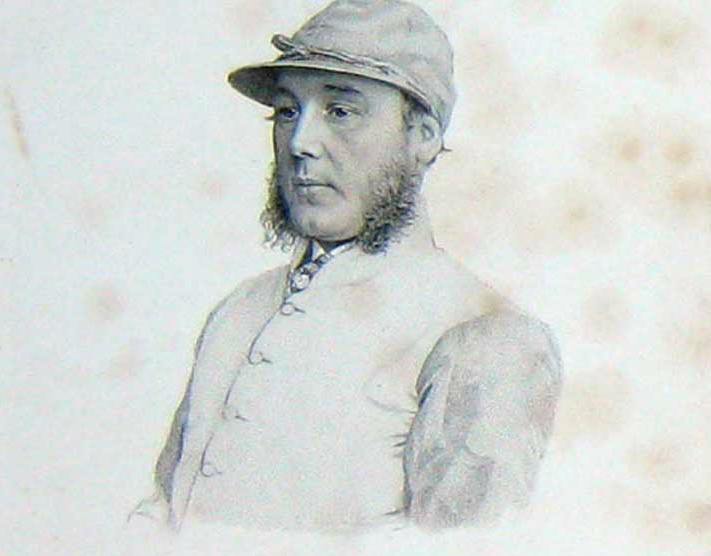
A British jockey with silk cap in 1862.

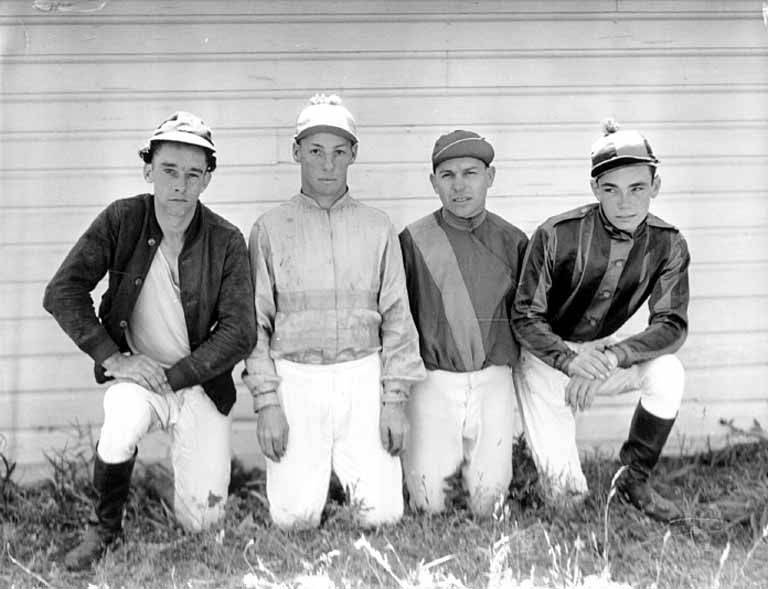
American jockeys with caps in 1922.

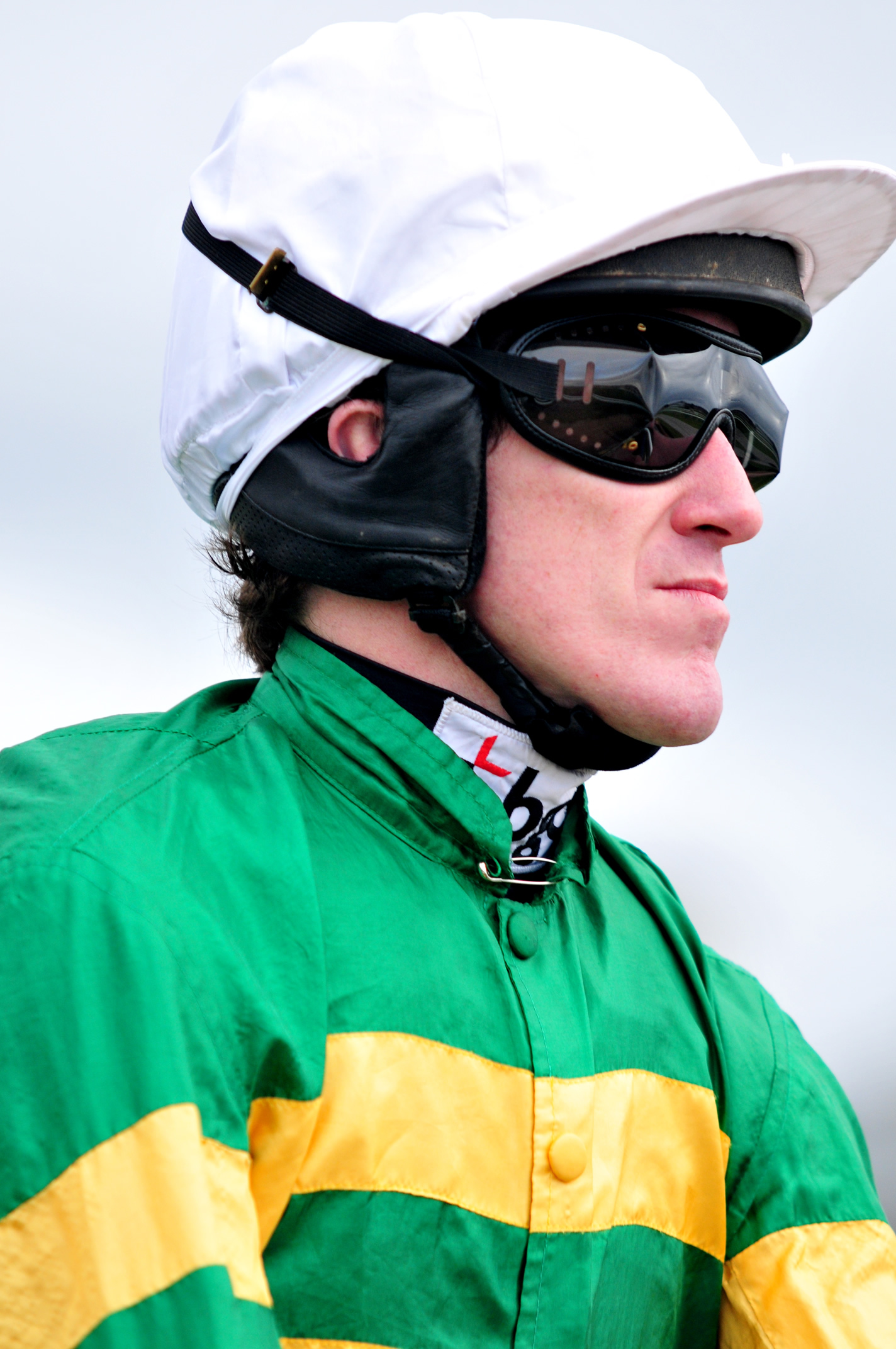
Modern jockey with head and eye protection.

== See also ==
- List of hat styles
