= Roc'h Trédudon attack =

1974 bombing of a TV mast in Brittany, France

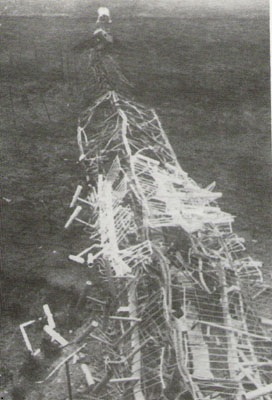
- The Roc'h Trédudon transmitter on the ground after the attack.

- Roc'h Trédudon attack (France) Roc'h Trédudon attack (Brittany)
- Location: 48°24′49″N 03°53′23″W; Plounéour-Ménez, Brittany
- Date: Night of 13–14 February 1974
- Target: Roc'h Trédudon transmitter
- Deaths: None
- Perpetrator: Breton Liberation Front

The Roc'h Trédudon attack was the destruction of the Roc'h Trédudon transmitter in Plounéour-Ménez, Finistère, by a series of bombs on the night of 13 to 14 February 1974. It was claimed by the Breton independence organization Breton Liberation Front (FLB), and deprived western Brittany of television for several weeks. It took place against a backdrop of the revival of the Breton nationalist movement, and sparked off fierce reactions and controversy as to the true identity of the perpetrators.

== Context ==
In 1974, Breton nationalism had enjoyed a spectacular revival in recent years. Artists such as Alan Stivell, Tri Yann and Glenmor, major social movements such as the Joint Français strike in 1972, and the creation of a large number of Breton organizations and parties led to a genuine revival of a sense of regional identity in Brittany. The Breton Liberation Front entered its most active period, which lasted until 1979, although it was officially dissolved on 30 January 1974 by the Minister of the Interior, Raymond Marcellin. The Roc'h Trédudon attack took place against a backdrop of renewed violence in Brittany, which had faded somewhat since 1973, when the FLB took no action. On the contrary, it was very active from 1966 to 1972, with more than twenty-seven attacks or attempted attacks claimed.

For Breton activists, attacking the Roc'h Trédudon transmitter was a symbol of great importance, for several reasons. Firstly, it was a response to the dissolution of the FLB and the repression of Breton autonomists by the French state. Secondly, at the same time, the nationalists wanted to "salute in their own way" the visit of Health Minister Michel Poniatowski to Quimper in February 1974, and thus give their demands international resonance. Finally, the attack was intended as a direct attack on ORTF, which shortly before had censored Charles Le Gall, the only Breton-language news presenter, for announcing the creation of support committees for Breton prisoners.

== The attack ==
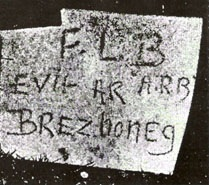
The wooden plaque left by FLB activists and found the morning after the attack.

On the night of 13 to 14 February 1974, the Breton independence commando placed a set of bombs - "four three-kilo F.15 gum charges, two per base, connected by electric detonators, in double ignition and additional connection by detonating cord" - on the pylons of the Roc'h Trédudon transmitter. The terrain and wind direction were studied beforehand to ensure that the antenna would not crash into the buildings occupied by the janitors, but would instead hit the technical room. To ensure the success of their operation, the activists first tested their equipment on two other pylons in the Côtes-d'Armor region: on Île Losquet near Pleumeur-Bodou on 1 February 1974, and on Roc'h ar Lin in Saint-Mayeux a few days earlier, both of which were claimed on 15 February 1974.

Despite the presence of military personnel on manoeuvres around the Roc'h Trédudon station during the night, two of the activists managed to place their bombs on the pylon bases. The whole thing exploded at around 1 a.m.: two blasts brought down the pylons supporting the antenna. The janitor, startled awake by the explosions, immediately called the authorities, who soon found a plywood plate marked with the words "FLB ARB" and "Evit ar Brezhoneg" (Breton for "for the Breton language"). The attack was also claimed a few days later by Yann Goulet, an expatriate Breton nationalist in Ireland, who claimed to be the leader of the FLB at the time.

== Damage and consequences ==
There were no direct victims. However, the center's director, Pierre Péron, died that afternoon of cardiac arrest on discovering the extent of the damage. According to one of Roc'h Trédudon's managers, the human toll could have been much higher: the explosion could have claimed the lives of the technicians as well as the janitor and his family, who were present that night. As for the material toll, it was significant: with the exception of the first sixty meters, the antenna, which measured two hundred and twenty-two meters at the time, was completely down, and part of it collapsed onto the ORTF and PTT buildings, close to the antenna at the time. A large part of Brittany was deprived of television for over a month. Repairs were quickly undertaken, but in view of the extent of the damage, they took a long time, and temporary relay transmitters had to be set up in Quimper and Plougastel-Daoulas. The total cost of repairs was estimated at the time at 5 million francs.

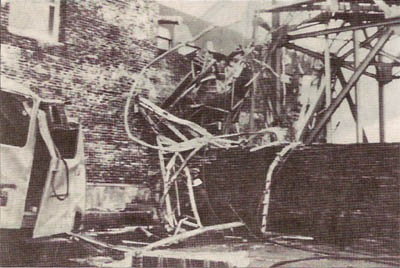
The antenna collapsed on ORTF's technical premises.

Brittany lived without television until early April 1974, or even early May for the most remote areas. Bretons rediscovered the life of their grandparents, bookshops were busy and nightly vigils resumed. According to FLB activists, this break could only be beneficial to the Breton people, in contrast to "the harmful role of TV", and there was even talk of a possible return of the baby boom to Brittany in the months following the attack. In any case, full repairs to the Roc'h Trédudon antenna were not completed until 1975, and in the months following the attack, the village of Plounéour-Ménez saw a record number of curious onlookers, from which the surrounding restaurants probably profited.

Despite an energetic investigation and the increased presence of gendarmes in the Monts d'Arrée, the bombers were never found. Nevertheless, this attack marked a decisive turning point in the history of the FLB: from that date onwards, the pro-independence organization claimed responsibility for its action in a press release sent to a local media outlet the very next day, rather than by leaving a note on the spot. This had the effect of sidelining Yann Goulet, who produced his own statement a few days later, sometimes in contradiction with the Breton activists. In 1977, a member of the FLB told a journalist from the regional newspaper Ouest-France that "Yann Goulet harmed the FLB much more than he served it".

== Reactions ==
Reaction to the attack was very strong. The "right-wing Parisian press" railed against the bombers, while the Breton media also condemned their act with varying degrees of firmness. The newspaper Ouest-France stated that "by signing their deed, the individuals claiming to be part of the Breton Liberation Front clearly demonstrated that their concern was not to protect and defend the interests of the Breton population", and that "the struggle for change did not involve criminal acts, but rather a struggle in which all the working-class and peasant masses had their rightful place". Le Télégramme, for its part, made no particular comment, describing those responsible for the attack as "true professionals". The CGT also "strongly condemned the perpetrators".

Georges Pompidou, who granted amnesty to Breton prisoners after his election, also deplored the consequences of the attack. However, in 1977, Valéry Giscard d'Estaing's government introduced a cultural charter providing subsidies to organizations defending Breton culture and language, allowing Diwan schools to flourish once and for all, much to the satisfaction of Breton activists, who later admitted that this "greatly diminished the demands".

Reactions in Brittany were very mixed. While a small proportion of Bretons, particularly Breton speakers, did not complain about the absence of television, without condoning the attack, others admitted that they "didn't know what to do" without an object "that they now realized was part of their daily lives". In an interview, the singer Youenn Gwernig described the latter as "people who reacted exactly like kids, like babies who had their candy cane taken away from them", whereas they used to denigrate ORTF programs. As for Yann Goulet, his reaction was more unexpected, since in his traditional statement he went so far as to deplore the effects of the attack and "the trouble it caused to old people whose only distraction was television". Finally, for the FLB itself, this was one of its most far-reaching actions to date.

== Controversies ==
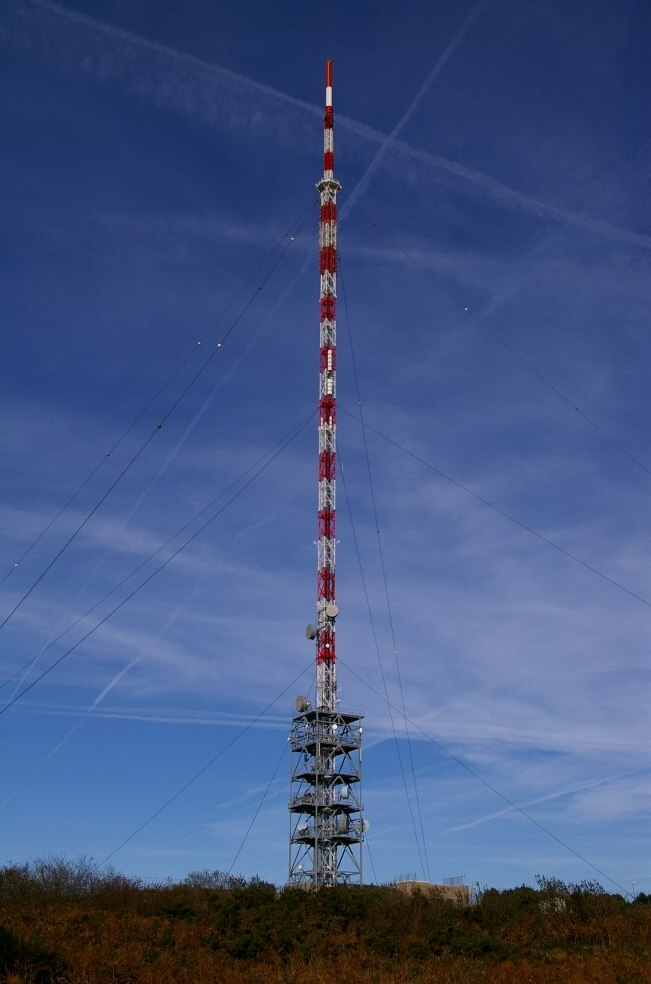
The Roc'h Trédudon transmitter today.

The fact that the perpetrators of the Roc'h Trédudon attack were never arrested or even identified, and the fact that, for many, this action could only have been carried out by professionals experienced in handling explosives, sparked off a vast controversy as to the true identity of the perpetrators, despite the FLB's claims to the contrary. The media and the general public initially suspected the French army, which was carrying out manoeuvres around the Roc'h Trédudon site on the evening of the attack, and some sources, such as historians Lionel Henry and Annick Lagadec, suggested that it might have been marine commandos. In March 1974, Le Canard enchaîné asserted that it was indeed military personnel who had inadvertently detonated the pylon. On the contrary, some believe that the explosion was totally deliberate, and served as a "real exercise" for the French military.

Another polemic developed around the responsibility of the Direction de la Surveillance du Territoire in the attack. Since 1966, the French secret services had always been very active, and were accused of manipulation and infiltration within the various Breton independence organizations, including the FLB. In 1972, in Saint-Malo, the DST destroyed Francis Bouygues' villa, then disguised the action as an attack by the FLB. The affair was reported in Le Matin de Paris on 22 September 1981 and in Le Canard enchaîné on 30 September 1981, which were quick to make other connections, notably with the destruction of the Roc'h Trédudon pylon. According to a journalist from Le Matin de Paris, the DST had once again tried to infiltrate the ranks of the Breton independence movement, and the Roc'h Trédudon attack had been carried out solely to discredit them among the Breton population. The surrounding gendarmeries even received instructions not to worry in the event of the pylon exploding, and to let "an FLB commando" blow up the transmitter.

Nevertheless, DST officials, who acknowledged the destruction of Francis Bouygues' villa, claimed that they had nothing to do with the Roc'h Trédudon attack. In 1999, Jean Baklouti, formerly of the DST, declared in Le Télégramme that the attack "was very sophisticated, too much for the FLB, but on reflection we thought of Yann Puillandre, who was an ex-military man", but that "the monstrous raids" and telephone tapping had not led to an indictment. For a time, Yann Puillandre was suspected of being one of the FLB-ARB "leaders".

== See also ==
- Breton nationalism
- Breton Liberation Front
- 1978 Palace of Versailles bombing
- 2020 Nashville bombing
- CLODO

== Bibliography ==
- Breizhistance (March 1994). "Interview des plastiqueurs de Trédudon". Combat Breton.
- Henry, Lionel; Lagadec, Annick (2006). FLB-ARB: l'histoire, 1966-2005 (in French). Yoran Embanner. ISBN 978-2-9521446-5-0.
- Bonnet, Marie-Pierre (1989). Bretagne 79: Des années de poudre (in French). Éditions Egina.
- Chartier, Erwan. La question bretonne: Enquête sur les mouvements politiques bretons (in French). An Here. ISBN 978-2-86843-263-6.
- Nicolas, Michel (2007). Histoire de la revendication bretonne (in French). Spézet: Coop Breizh. ISBN 978-2-84346-312-9.
- Chartier, Erwan; Cabon, Alain (2006). Le dossier FLB: Plongée chez les clandestins bretons (in French). Spézet: Coop Breizh. ISBN 978-2-84346-296-2.
