= Alcatel OneTouch 960C =

Android smartphone

Alcatel OneTouch 960C (Alcatel Authority)
- Also known as: Alcatel Authority
- Brand: Alcatel OneTouch
- Manufacturer: TCL
- First released: OneTouch 960C; October 18, 2012; 13 years ago (North America, Alltel Wireless); Authority; January 20, 2013; 13 years ago (Cricket Wireless)
- Compatible networks: 3G (Bands 1, 8)
- Color: Black
- Dimensions: 127 mm × 68 mm × 9.8 mm (5.00 in × 2.68 in × 0.39 in)
- Weight: 124.0 g (4.37 oz)
- Operating system: Android 2.3
- CPU: 1.4 GHz single-core
- GPU: Yes
- Memory: 512 MB RAM
- Storage: 2048 MB (2 GB) ROM
- Removable storage: microSDHC up to 32 GB
- Battery: 1500 mAh Li-ion
- Rear camera: 5 MP, Autofocus, LED flash Video: 720p at 30 fps
- Front camera: 0.3 MP VGA
- Display: 800 x 480 px, (217 ppi), 16M colors
- Connectivity: Bluetooth 3.0, Wi-Fi 802.11 b/g/n, Micro-USB (USB 2.0), A-GPS, HDMI, 3.5 mm jack
- SAR: Head: 0.96 W/kg, Body: 1.12 W/kg

The Alcatel OneTouch 960C, also known as the Alcatel Authority, is a low-end Android smartphone manufactured by TCL under the brand Alcatel. It was released in October 2012 in North America.

The Authority was also be released on January 20, 2013 by Cricket Wireless at the CES 2013 showcase in Las Vegas. It cann also access Cricket platforms as well as pre-installed games:

- Cricket 411 - local searches
- Cricket Navigator - for GPS uses
- Muve Music
- Block Braker 3 and Uno

== Specifications ==
=== Hardware ===
The Alcatel OneTouch 960C is powered by a single-core processor clocked at 1400 MHz. It features 512 MB (0.5 GB) of RAM and 2048 MB of internal ROM. For additional storage, the device includes a microSDHC slot capable of expanding memory by up to 32 GB.

The device houses a 4.3-inch TFT display with a resolution of 800 x 480 pixels (WVGA), resulting in a pixel density of approximately 217 PPI. The hardware is housed in a chassis measuring 5.00 x 2.6 x 0.39 inches (127 x 68 x 9.8 mm) and weighing 4.37 oz (124 g). It is equipped with a 1500 mAh Lithium-ion battery.

=== Camera ===
The device features a dual-camera setup:

- Main Camera: A 5-megapixel main camera equipped with autofocus and an LED flash. It is capable of recording video at 720p resolution at 30 frames per second.
- Front Camera: A 0.3-megapixel VGA sensor intended for basic self-portraits and video calls.

=== Software ===
The OneTouch 960C Ultra launched with the Android 2.3 (Gingerbread) operating system.
