= Strollad Pobl Vreizh =

Defunct Breton political party

Breton Republican Party Strollad Pobl Vreizh
- President: Jean-Pierre Le Mat
- Founded: Spring 1979
- Dissolved: November 1983
- Merged into: Breton Independence Movement
- Headquarters: Brest, Brittany
- Newspaper: Douar Breizh / Breton Republic
- Ideology: Breton nationalism Separatism; Anti-imperialism; Republicanism
- Political position: Left-wing to far-left
- Colours: Black, white (Gwenn-ha-Du)

The Strollad Pobl Vreizh (SPV) (English: Breton Republican Party), was a pro-Breton political party, active from 1979 to 1983, that advocated for Breton independence and the establishment of a sovereign Breton Republic. Emerging in the post-1968 nationalist revival, the SPV rejected French state authority, promoted non-violent symbolic activism, and supported Breton resistance to military conscription. Its newspaper, Douar Breizh / République Bretonne, was a key platform for spreading its ideas.

== History ==
=== Formation ===
Founded in spring 1979 among Breton activists in Paris and Lower Brittany, the SPV aimed for complete separation from France, criticizing regionalism and autonomy as insufficient. Disillusioned by the French Socialist Party's failure to deliver on decentralization and regional language recognition after 1981, the SPV drew inspiration from global liberation movements in Ireland, Algeria, and Poland, viewing Brittany as a colonized nation. · Its 1981 charter declared breaking ties with France as essential for a Breton Republic.

=== Activism ===
The SPV used bold, symbolic actions to promote its separatist agenda. Its monthly newspaper, Douar Breizh (2,500–3,000 copies), covered Breton issues and supported struggles of other oppressed groups like the Irish, Basques, and Corsicans. · Notable actions included:

- 1981: Militants tore down a French flag at Rennes’ Foch barracks to protest the imprisonment of Breton conscientious objectors. · ·
- 1982: Activists defaced a plaque in Vannes commemorating the 1532 union with France, denouncing it as a loss of Breton sovereignty. ·
- 1983: The SPV renamed Gambetta streets in several Breton cities to honor Breton conscripts and objectors. ·

The party opposed French nuclear projects, like the Plogoff power plant, as tools of centralization, joining anti-nuclear protests at Plogoff and Le Carnet. · It strongly backed the Breton Insurrection Movement (MIB), supporting draft resisters through protests and fundraising. · ·

=== Challenges and repression ===
The SPV faced state repression, with France invoking laws against threats to territorial integrity. In 1982, leader Jean-Pierre Le Mat was briefly jailed on dubious weapons charges.. In 1983, MIB members received harsh sentences for draft resistance, which the SPV decried as targeting its separatist ideology. The party also refuted accusations of extremism, emphasizing its republican, non-violent stance and blaming French colonial policies for any tensions.

=== Dissolution ===
In November 1983, the SPV dissolved and merged with the MIB to form the Breton Independence Movement. · Some members joined Emgann, continuing the fight for independence. Despite its short lifespan, the SPV revitalized the Breton independence debate, influencing later movements.

== Ideology ==
The SPV sought a Breton Republic through national liberation, rejecting regionalism, autonomism, and federalism. Its 1981 charter outlined:

- Total separation from France, seen as a colonial power.
- Full Breton sovereignty in politics, economics, and culture.
- Solidarity with other oppressed peoples (e.g., Irish, Basques).
- Rejection of fascism and racism, countering critics’ claims.

The party viewed Breton nationalism as a response to French oppression and planned to dissolve post-independence, leaving Bretons to shape their society.

== Symbols ==
The SPV used the Gwenn-ha-Du flag, with its black stripes forming "SPV," and an emblem combining a triskell and Excalibur, symbolizing resistance and Breton heritage. A large flag was displayed at rallies for visual impact.

== Organization ==
Led by Jean-Pierre Le Mat, a former draft resister, the SPV had a political bureau with figures like Brigitte Lever and Alan Coraud. Local federations in Brest, Lorient, and Loire-Atlantique coordinated actions, while commissions handled agriculture, international relations, and propaganda. Regular meetings and fundraising sustained its operations.
