= Breton Revolutionary Army =

Breton Revolutionary Army Armée révolutionnaire bretonne
- Founded: 1971
- Ideology: Breton nationalism Revolutionary socialism Revolutionary nationalism
- Political position: Left-wing to Far left

The Breton Revolutionary Army (French: Armée Révolutionnaire Bretonne, ARB; Breton: Talbenn Dieubiñ Breizh, TDB) is an illegal armed organization that is part of the Breton nationalist movement in the Brittany region of France.

== History ==
=== Origins of the conflict ===
Until the end of the 15th century, Brittany had managed to remain independent of its French and English neighbours. However, in December 1491, after two consecutive civil wars opposing the French Crown to an alliance of French Princes (among them Brittany) and foreign powers, the latter were defeated and the young Breton duchess, Anne, was married to the young King Charles VIII, thereby tying Brittany to France.

In 1532, the then French monarch, Francis I of France, officially tied Brittany to France despite originally allowing it to preserve its fiscal and legal privileges. This partial autonomy, in turn, allowed Brittany to remain unaffected by most of the foreign and domestic conflicts that afflicted the French Kingdom throughout the sixteenth and seventeenth centuries.

During the French Revolution, however, Brittany's relative autonomy was revoked. As a consequence, its parliament was abolished, the Breton language was banned, and its territory was split into five divisions. This new, transformed Brittany provoked polarized reactions throughout the five new departments, as some overwhelmingly endorsed such fusion with France while others systematically rebelled against the fragile new Republic.

=== L'Armée Revolutionnaire Bretonne (ARB) ===
L'Armée Revolutionnaire Bretonne (ARB), or the Breton Revolutionary Army, was created in 1971 as the armed wing of the Front de Liberation Breton (FLB), or the Breton Liberation Front. The FLB was established in 1963 with the intention to secure the liberation of Brittany from France. The ARB seeks recognition by the French government of the existence of the Breton people, the integrity of its territory, and the Breton language. Christian Georgeault, the group's current leader, is a former Emgann general Secretary.

The 1974 bombing in Roc Tredudon marks the first of approximately 200 terrorist acts committed by the FLB-ARB on foreign soil, both inside and outside Brittany.

The ARB, unlike its Corsican (FLNC) and Basque (ETA) counterparts, does not seek to achieve human casualties. This is a view shared across the entire Breton political spectrum and especially by the Breton people who, until the attack on a McDonald's in 2000 during which an employee was killed, have tolerated the actions of the separatist movement. Until the 2000 attack, there had been only two deaths resulting from the attacks, both of whom were ARB members who died while attempting to defuse their own bombs. Nevertheless, considerable property damage has been inflicted as a result of these attacks.

The frequency of attacks increased between 1993 and 1996. A two-year truce followed. Attacks resumed on 30 October 1998 with the partial destruction of the Belfort city hall, home town of the then Interior Minister Jean-Pierre Chevènement. Other subsequent targets included symbols of the French government such as administrative offices, police precincts and utility installations, as well as the home towns of then-Prime Minister Lionel Jospin. The latter attack, which occurred on 18 June 1999, was a result of the refusal, two days before, by the then French President Jacques Chirac to ratify the European Charter on Regional and Minority Languages.

=== The 1999 Plévin heist and the ETA-ARB connection ===
The theft of eight and a half tons of an explosive, Titadine 30, from one of the warehouses of the company Titanite SA, in Plévin on 28 September 1999 by an ETA and ARB commando is one of the most notable achievements of the ARB to date (the security alarm system had been carefully dismantled). This incident served to confirm suspicions about the nature of the relationship between the ETA and the Breton separatists. As the subsequent investigation revealed, ARB members had been hosting Basque separatists in Brittany prior to the heist. Spanish authorities even suspect that some ETA members may at times come to Brittany temporarily in search of a safe haven.

The investigation also confirmed the close relationship between Emgann and the ARB; Arnaud Vannier, an Emgann member, was arrested in connection with the Plévin heist when twenty-five sticks of dynamite, two detonators, two timers linked to the heist were found in the trunk of his car. Emgrann replied to the accusations saying that it was not responsible for the activities of individual members. Half a dozen individuals were subsequently arrested in connection with the heist. Three days after the heist, three ETA members were arrested near Pau, France, with a van containing two and a half tons of explosives, all originating from Plévin. Two other individuals, Denis Riou and Richard Lefaucheux, were arrested for their complicity in the heist (renting cars to pick up the Basque separatists and providing them with shelter in Lorient).

=== McDonald’s bombing ===
On Wednesday 19 April 2000, around 10 a.m., a 1.5 kilogram bomb exploded after being placed near the drive-through of a McDonald's restaurant in Quévert, Brittany. At the time of the explosion, there were three teenagers and two other customers in the building. A 27-year-old employee, Laurence Turbec, was killed as she attempted to make her way through a service entrance; no other casualties were sustained.

The explosion did not ignite a fire but the building itself sustained severe damage and its roof was blown off.

The explosive used was Titane 30, the same type of dynamite stolen in 1999 from Plévin, suggesting that the ARB may have been responsible for this bombing. Further evidence confirmed this relationship, as at the same moment the Quévert bombing was taking place, another bomb near a post office in Rennes was defused by police.

Forensic analysis determined that Titane 30 had been used during both attacks. A piece of spring found in the remains found at the Quévert site was found to originate from the same type of kitchen timer used to offset the defused explosive in Rennes. The use of kitchen timers also confirmed the ARB's involvement given their systematic use in previous bombings.

While the perpetrators of the bombing were never found, four individuals were subsequently arrested as a result of the investigation. Stéphane Phillipe, Pascal Laizé, and Christian Gorgeault (the presumed ARB ringleader) were arrested for suspected complicity; Gael Roblin, the main spokesman of Emgann, was also arrested for his theoretical justification of previous ARB bombings. The four men were ultimately acquitted of charges in the Quévert bombing, but they were sentenced the same day to serve prison terms (six, eight, eleven, and three years respectively) for their involvement in prior attacks.

While the ARB claimed to be unrelated to the Quévert bombing, in November 2000 police confirmed that the group had returned a hundred kilograms of the explosives stolen in the Plévin heist in 1999 to police authorities. This action came following a statement by the ARB that it sought to appease the current political climate in Brittany as well as an end to the repression of the ARB.

== Emgann ("Fight") ==
Emgann is believed to provide political support to the ARB. Its affiliation with the latter has been repeatedly denied over the years by Emgann, which considers itself a pacifist group, although it openly supports the ARB's methods and goals. It nonetheless publishes the ARB's messages and articles and substantial evidence has been produced by French authorities to support claims of the suspected intimate and complicit relationship between the two groups. Several Emgann members have been apprehended in connection with several attacks attributed to the ARB.

Created in 1982, Emgann defines itself as part of the independent Breton leftist wing. Pro-independence and anti-capitalist, Emgann advocates for no compromise or contact with the French government and political parties. Its activism came in the wake of the election of François Mitterrand to the French Presidency. In 1981, the newly elected state leader had pardoned members of the FLB who had just been convicted and imprisoned by the State Security Court, in France. Their release provoked the dismantlement of the FLB as many of its newly released members gave up their former violent activism and instead chose to retire or join the Breton Democratic Union (UDB), an autonomist Breton political movement opposed to violence. Emgann, therefore, picked up the FLB's mantle and sought to pursue the fight.

== Recruitment ==
While in the 1970s many ARB recruits came from universities and other parts of the Breton elite, today most if not all are mainly drawn from either urban and unemployed youth, those living on welfare, and those on limited and short term employment. According to French authorities, this non-specialized recruitment illustrates the amateur nature of the bombings by the ARB.

On 25 November 1999 police managed to retrieve 2.5 kilograms of dynamite in Saint-Herblain because the timer had malfunctioned and was out of order. On 28 November that year, in Rennes, police defused a bomb with a nearby sign indicating the presence of an ARB explosive device.

Other attacks by the ARB, such as the 1998 bombing of Belfort City Hall and the Plévin attack, demonstrate a greater degree of sophistication. Police theorize that this divergence in preparedness and specialization may be explained by the occasional collaboration between the ARB and their Basque counterparts, the ETA.

== Support ==
=== Financial Support ===
Local financial support for the ARB is geared toward the families of its incarcerated members. This financial support is provided by Skoazell Vreizh (in English, "Breton assistance"), led by longtime president Pierre Locquet. A former FLB member, Locquet was convicted for an attack in the 1970s.

Locquet considers his organisation essential in helping anyone who commits an act that defies French authority. Upon capture, the perpetrator's family is contacted by Skoazell Vreizh to make arrangements in order to pay their legal fees. In cases of incarceration, the organisation supports the prisoner's family financially until their release.

Until the 1990s, Skoazell Vreizh had mainly used its financial support to assist minor delinquents who engaged in activities including repainting street signs in Breton, refusing to pay the national television tax in protest of the lack of a Breton channel, or paying their taxes by writing checks in Breton. Skoazell Vreizh faced increasing costs in the 1990s as the seriousness of the ARB's attacks increased.

The largest financial contributions to Skoazell Vreizh are from the Breton Democratic Union and the Breton Cultural Institute, a branch of the Breton Regional Counsel. The organization also raises funds through donations at concerts and public events.

=== Popular support ===
Until the McDonald's attack in 2000, the ARB and Emgann enjoyed widespread support throughout Brittany, in part due to its explicitly nonviolent tactics. However, the death of Laurence Turbec in the 2000 attack had a tremendously negative impact on the group's popularity. The attack was condemned by both Breton left- and right-wing groups. The UDB clamored for the perpetrators to turn themselves in; similarly, the center-right party feared the attack might signal an ideological drift toward a more violent type of radicalism, such as that of their ETA counterparts. A spokesman for Emgann called the act unacceptable and unjustifiable. Former ARB members similarly denounced the attack and called for the ARB to justify itself publicly. Pierre Locquet was also said to be sickened by the attack; he criticized its amateur nature, pointing out that in the 1970s, ARB members would always stay nearby so as to ensure that the explosive would work as intended and that no casualties would be sustained.
