= Emgann =

Left-wing Breton nationalist movement in Brittany, France

Emgann is a left-wing Breton nationalist movement in Brittany, France. Founded in 1982, it soon became one of the principal groups agitating for Breton independence. They describe themselves as a "Left-wing independentist movement" which "fights for the emancipation and the national liberation of the Breton people and their direct representation in European authorities".

== Origin ==
Emgann emerges from the third Emsav, the revival of Breton nationalism as a leftist movement after the 1960s. It describes itself as anti-capitalist and anti-racist movement. It was formed in 1983 by radical militants within the Breton independence movement after the sudden shift in French politics caused by the 1981 election of a leftist government. Shortly after it was elected, the Mitterrand government granted an amnesty to the nineteen Breton militants still in prison at the time, removing one of the political demands of Breton nationalists. Between their release and the establishment of a left-wing government in Paris, leftist nationalism began to dwindle in Brittany, and Emgann was established in large part in response to this change in the political climate.

Emgann's 1988 manifesto also emphasises the importance of solidarity with other national liberation movements, citing Basque nationalists as an example.

One of Emgann's particularities is its refusal of all contact with established French political parties, and its atypical pattern of recruitment. At the end of the 1990s, it was largely absent from the universities - the traditional recruiting ground of French radical political movements - but instead tended to recruit new members in urban areas, especially among the young unemployed and under-employed. As a result, the movement's militancy tends to be proportionate to the weakness of the local economy.

In 1995, Emgann organised a celebration of the Breton nation called Devezh Ar Vro. The movement also publishes a journal called Combat Breton, currently edited by Yann Puillandre.

== Connection with the Breton Revolutionary Army ==
Emgann's leaders are adamant that "Emgann is not the legal mouthpeice of the ARB" (Armée Révolutionnaire Bretonne - Breton Revolutionary Army). The ARB is the armed branch of the Front de Libération de la Bretagne (Breton Liberation Front) - a banned organisation that French law considers to be a terrorist group. Despite Emgann's denials of any formal link between the two organisations, its official statements call the ARB a "patriotic resistance organisation" and their journal Combat Breton publishes the ARB's press releases.

Emgann claims that it does not approve of the violent actions of the ARB, but it doesn't disapprove either, treating them instead as "a logical consequence of the colonialist French state and the desperation of young Bretons." However, several members of Emgann were arrested and convicted by French courts as accomplices in the theft of several tonnes of explosives from a Breton company in Plévin (Côtes-d'Armor) in 1999. This theft was followed by a series of bombings attributed to the ARB, including a fatal explosion at a McDonald's in Quévert (Côtes-d'Armor). Ultimately, a former spokesman for Emgann was cleared of conspiracy to commit terrorist acts for the bombings in Quévert and elsewhere. However, since many of the accused were held in provisional detention for several years before their trials, many were released, having been imprisoned for longer than the time they were sentenced to before their trials even started. One has appealed his conviction to the European Court of Human Rights. These lengthy delays and other claimed irregularities in the trial have led to their condemnation by Emgann as a "travesty".

== Aims ==
- The reunification of Loire-Atlantique with Brittany.
- The official recognition of the Breton people and the Breton language.
- The freeing of Breton political prisoners

== See also ==
- Armée Révolutionnaire Bretonne
- Front de Libération de la Bretagne
