= 1978 Palace of Versailles bombing =

Terrorist bombing in France

Palace of Versailles bombing
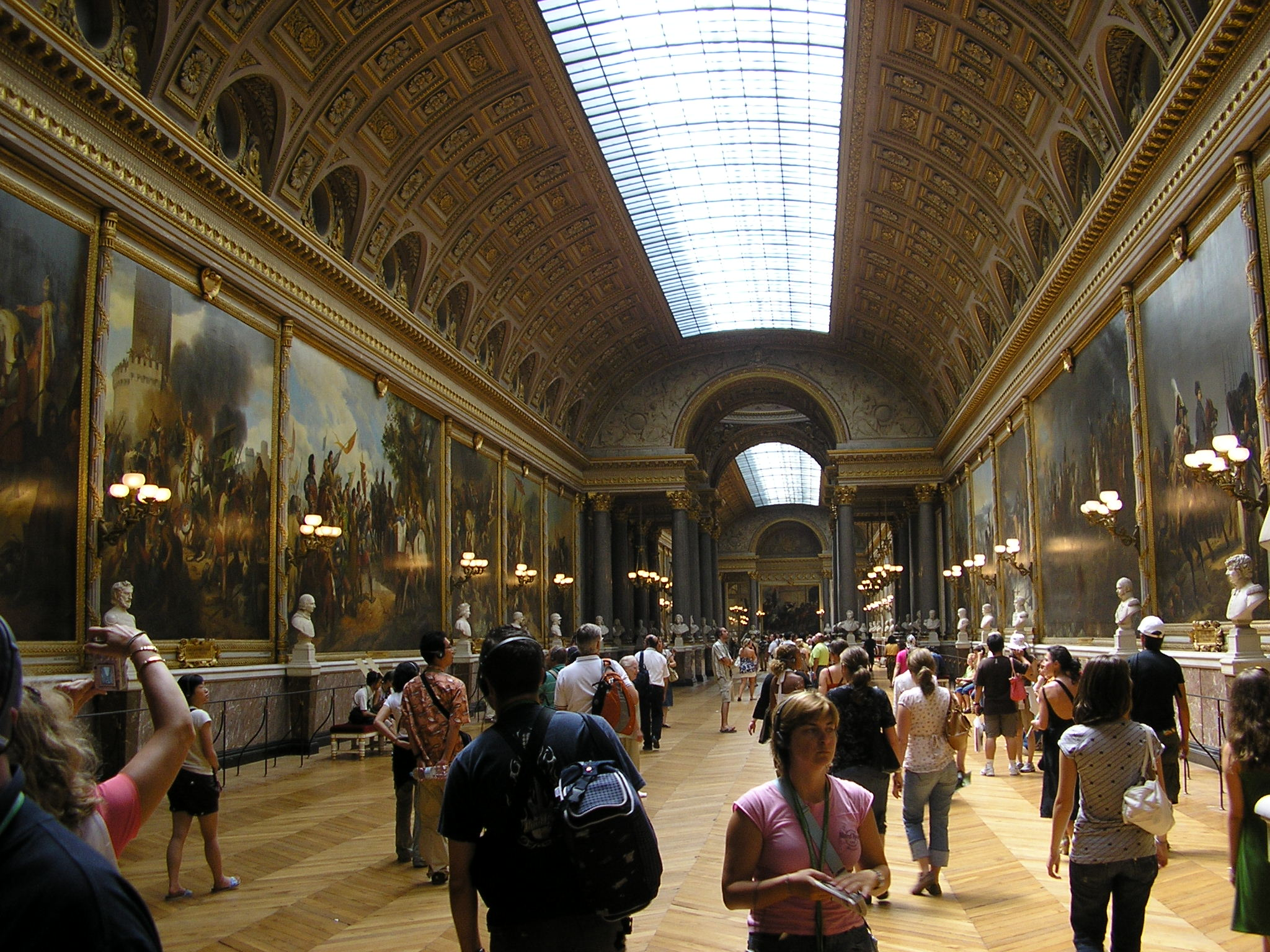
- The Batailles gallery, pictured 2007
- Location: 48°48′15.93″N 2°7′13.03″E; Versailles, France
- Date: June 26, 1978; 2:05 am
- Deaths: 0
- Injuries: 1
- Perpetrator: Breton Liberation Front

Around 2:30 am on Monday, 26 June 1978, the historic Palace of Versailles near Paris, France, was bombed by Breton nationalists belonging to the Breton Liberation Front (FLB). The powerful explosion occurred on the ground floor of the left wing of the palace and caused damage within an 80 meter radius. Many statues and priceless paintings were damaged, including an entire gallery and several pieces of Napoleonic art, and a wide hole was opened in the ceiling. The bomb caused millions of francs in damage. The Hall of Mirrors, opera house and chapel were undamaged. One night guard was wounded.

== Aftermath and convictions ==
French Minister of Culture Jean-Philippe Lecat said the bombing evokes an "absolutely heinous criminal side" of the Breton nationalists. Hubert Landais, the director of French museums at the time, called the attack a "real catastrophe." The Breton Democratic Union also condemned the attack. After the bombing, restoration works commenced costing 3 million francs. The Bataille room was finally re-opened to the public in April 1982.

Both the FLB and the Armed Nuclei for Popular Autonomy claimed responsibility, but police later found that it was caused by the Breton group. The two perpetrators were FLB members Lionel Chenevière and Padrig Montauzier, who placed the bomb the day before. The two were already under surveillance by authorities in Rennes, and were arrested the next day. They were sentenced to death in November 1978. Following the election of François Mitterrand as President in 1981, they were freed after an amnesty law had been enacted as part of Mitterrand's plans to give in to some of the demands of the Breton regional government.

The attack came in the context of renewed terrorist activity by the FLB in 1976, targeting cultural property in protest of the signing of the Breton Cultural Charter. The group were trying to 'punish' the French state for its annexation of the formerly independent Brittany region. The FLB's activities were usually confined to Brittany itself. German tabloid Die Welt later said no reasonable French person wants the state to grant independence to peripheral provinces, "nor Brittany, nor Alsace, nor Occitania."

The Palace of Versailles became a UNESCO World Heritage Site in 1979.

== See also ==
- 1974 Tower of London bombing
- Laszlo Toth
- The Roc'h Trédudon attack
