= Republican Memorial, Crossmaglen =

Memorial in Crossmaglen, County Armagh

Coordinates: 54°04′39″N 6°36′29″W

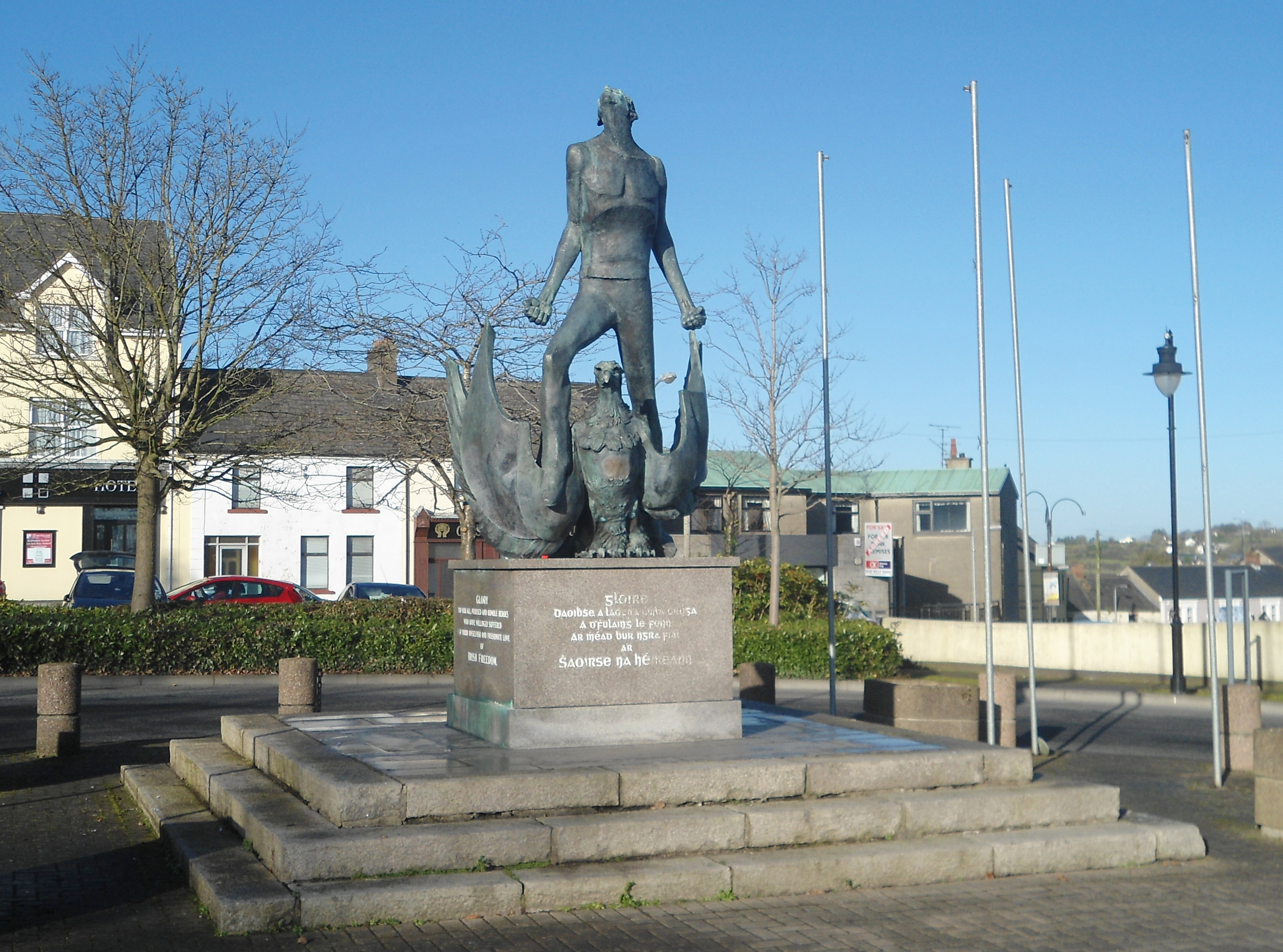
'Republican Memorial

The Republican Memorial is a memorial in Crossmaglen, County Armagh, Northern Ireland. The memorial was unveiled in 1979 during The Troubles, as a dedication to the Provisional Irish Republican Army.

== History ==
During The Troubles, Crossmaglen and the South Armagh region were nicknamed "Bandit Country" by the British Army, due to the overwhelming support for the Provisional Irish Republican Army. The British Army established a base in the town, and in response, the Republican residents installed a Republican Memorial in the centre of the village, in Cardinal O'Fiaich Square.

The sculpture was designed by Yann Renard-Goulet (1914–1999), a native of Brittany. The pedestal features a phrase that is repeated in both English and Irish:

Glóıre

daoıḃse a laoċra uṁla cróga
a d'ḟulaıng le fonn
ar ṁéad ḃur ngrá fıal
ar

Ṡaoırse na hÉıreann.

GLORY

to you all praised and humble heroes
who have willingly suffered
for your unselfish and passionate love
of

IRISH FREEDOM
