= Pierre Suard =

French engineer (1934–2025)

Pierre Suard (9 November 1934 – 27 November 2025) was a French engineer, senior official, director of national companies and alumnus of École Polytechnique and École des Ponts ParisTech.

== Life and career ==
Suard was born in Lons-le-Saunier on 9 November 1934. In the 1990s, he was the chairman of Alcatel Alsthom SA.

Suard died on 27 November 2025, at the age of 91.
