= Joint Français Strike =

Strike in Saint-Brieuc

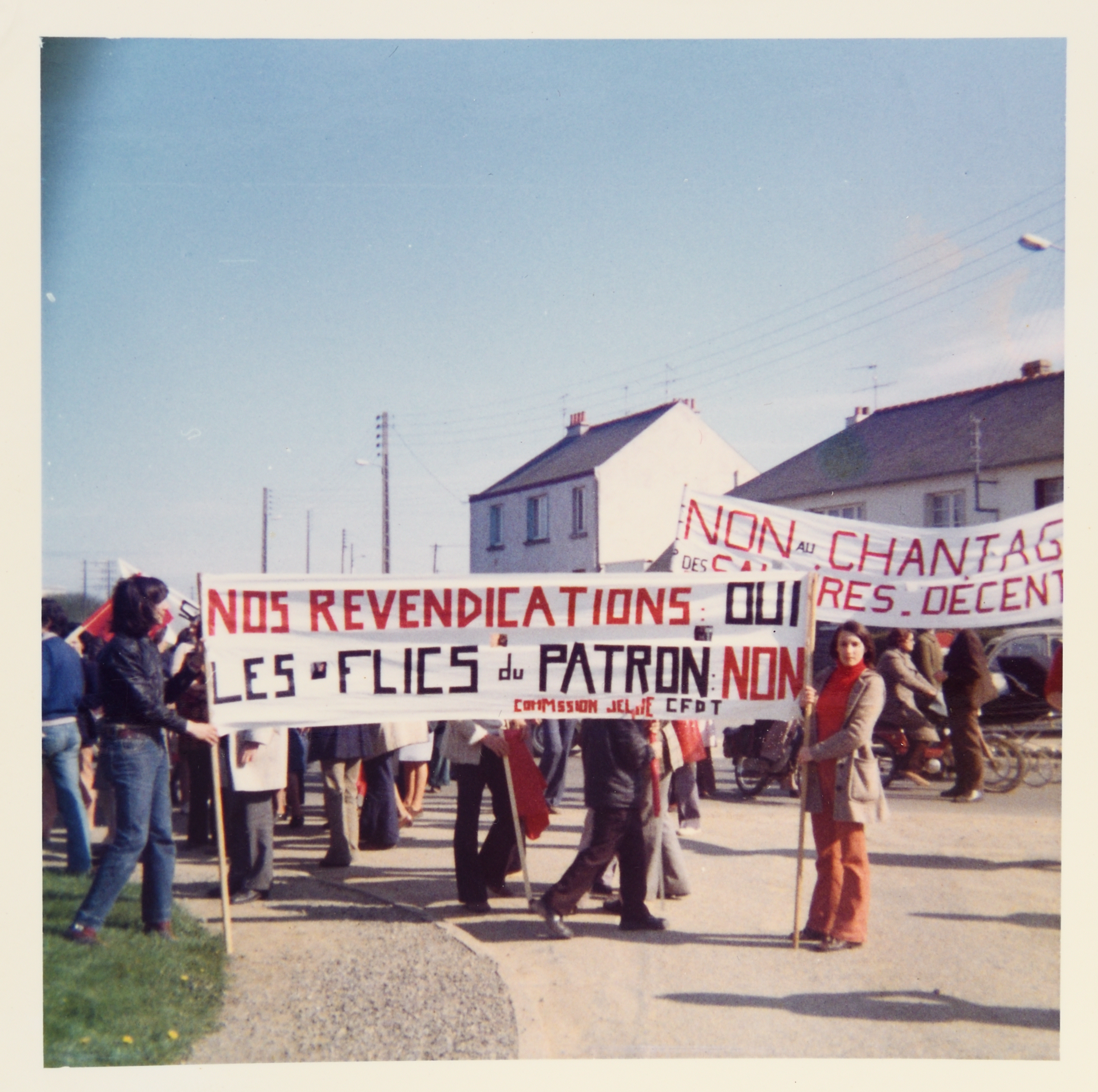
Protesters during the Joint Français strike

The Joint Français strike was an eight-week strike by workers at the Joint Français factory (a subsidiary of the Compagnie Générale d'Électricité) in Saint-Brieuc. It began on February 15, 1972, and ended on May 8, 1972, after management agreed to their demands.

With its combination of wage and territorial demands, this strike sparked a movement of regional and national solidarity that made it an exemplary and inspiring movement. Its scale and impact make it a unique marker in the history of Brittany.

== Background ==
Since the 19th century, France has experienced a phenomenon of concentration of economic activity in the Île-de-France region. The publication of the book Paris and the French Desert by Jean-François Gravier in 1947 contributed to bringing the need to decentralize the country into public debate.

After the Second World War, Brittany saw the emergence of a young working class, aided by the rural exodus, which saw a new population often "steeped in Catholicism" settle in the region's towns. Poorly educated, very feminine, and not very politicized, this population did not have the same "tradition of struggle" as the large old working-class centers of Brittany such as Brest, Lorient, or Nantes.

== Progress ==
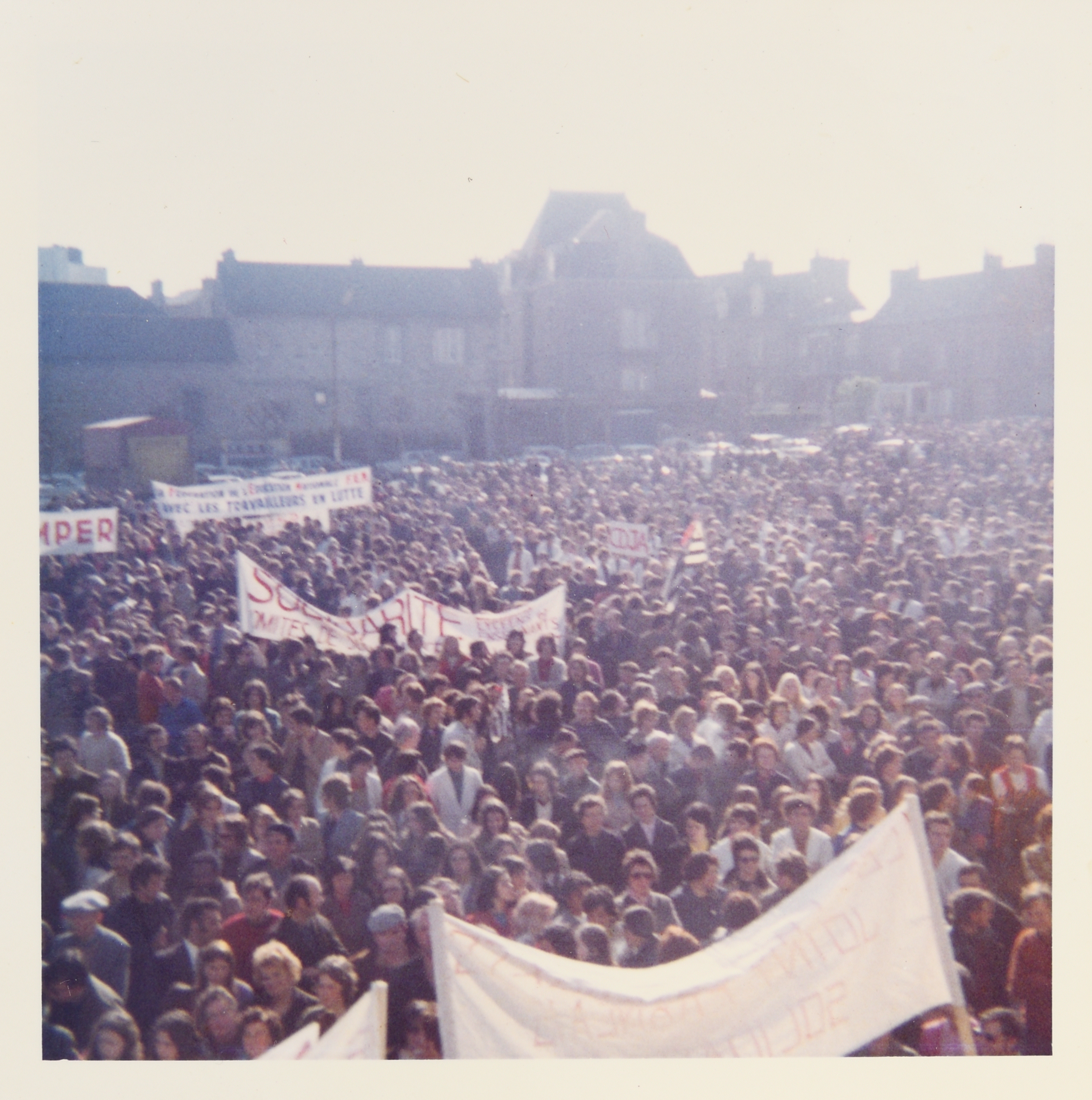
The large demonstration on April 18th mobilized 10,000 people in the streets of Saint-Brieuc.

Two-thirds of the factory's workers are women, and a large proportion of the workers have only a low level of education, coming from the rural world or being seasonal workers or laborers. The factory is also the last in Saint-Brieuc to have joined the May 68 movement, following the intervention of people outside it.Other factories in the town such as Chaffoteaux et Maury or Sambre et Meuse are much more at the forefront of union demands.çais has the reputation of being only a factory for Specialized Workers characterized by a very high turnover.

The first phase of the conflict took place from February 14 to March 13, 1972. The union delegates from the Saint-Brieuc site submitted a list of five demands to the Paris headquarters, as the company's local representatives had no decision-making power.

== Legacy ==
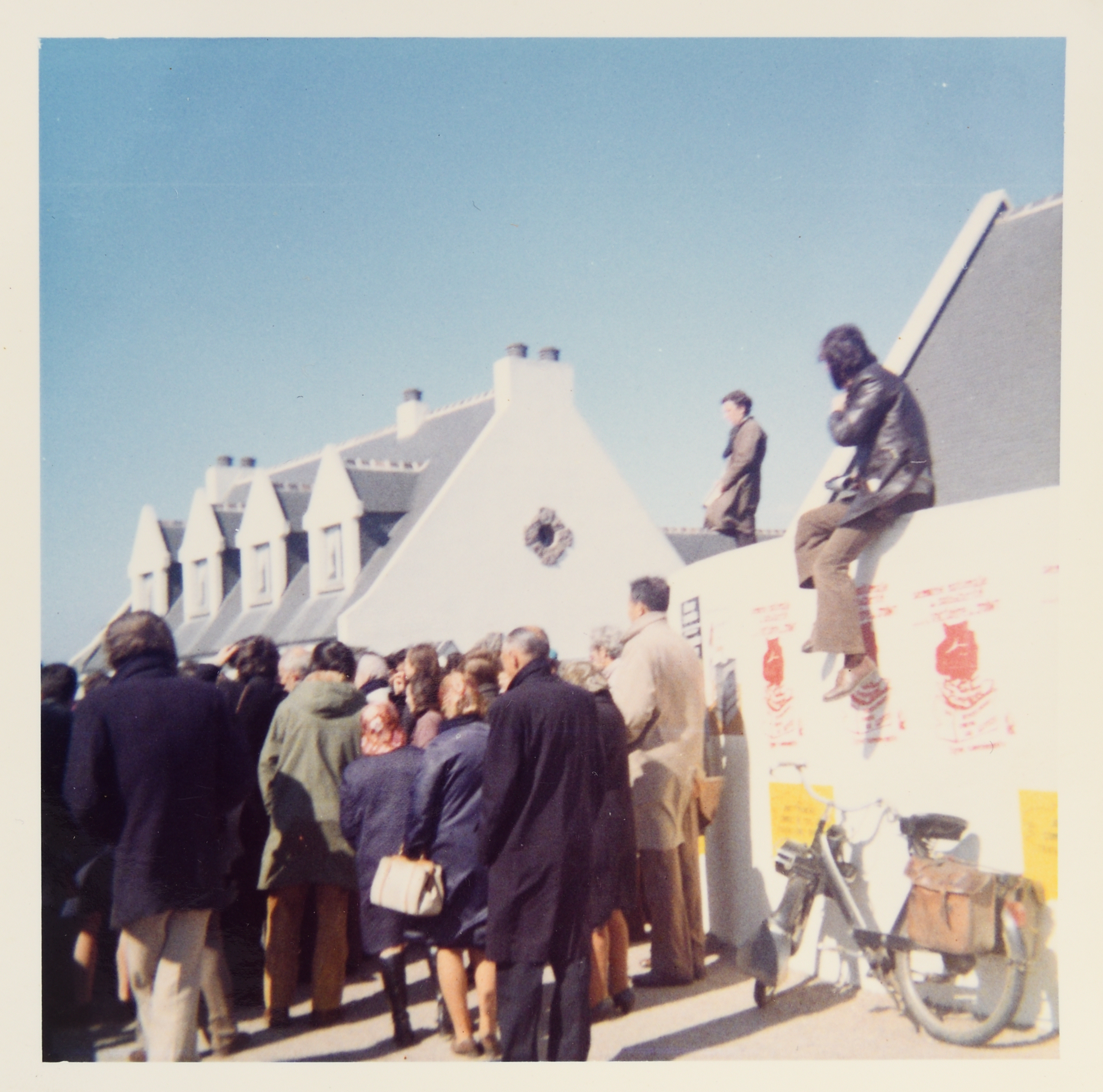
Action in front of the factory gates

In 1986, Joint Français was acquired by Hutchinson, a subsidiary of the TotalEnergies group. The factory remains in people's memories associated with the 1972 strike, and the memory of this last strike is still invoked as a historical reference in the media when any strike is announced at the site, such as in 2007.

In 2022, the Saint-Brieuc factory, still located on rue Ampère, was still producing gaskets, mainly for the automotive industry. The factory's workforce had declined sharply over the years: a thousand employees in the 1970s, around 500 in 2012 and barely 300 in 2022.

The fiftieth anniversary of the Joint français strike is giving rise to several events in Saint-Brieuc. An academic symposium is being organized at the Mazier campus which brings together in May 2022 actors from the time, but also researchers such as Gilles Richard, Tangui Perron, Régis Boulat, Philippe Buton, Fanny Gallot, David Bensoussan, Yvon Tranvouez, Ambroise Georget, Alain Prigent, François Prigent, Anne Dalmasso, Jérôme Letournel, Guillaume Gourgues, Alexandre Fernandez, Tudi Kernalegenn, Vincent Porhel, Hugo Melchior, Christian Bougeard, Noël Barbe and Nayeli Palomo.
