= Breton Liberation Front =

Paramilitary group in France (1963–1990s)

Breton Liberation Front Talbenn Dieubiñ Breizh Front de Libération de la Bretagne
- The organization logo
- Dates active: 1963 – 1990s
- Active regions: Brittany, France
- Ideology: Breton separatism Celtic nationalism Revolutionary socialism Marxism-Leninism; Factions: European federalism

The Breton Liberation Front (Breton: Talbenn Dieubiñ Breizh, French: Front de Libération de la Bretagne or FLB) was a paramilitary organisation founded in 1963 whose aims were to seek greater autonomy for the region of Brittany (Breton: Breizh) separate from the rest of France. Brittany is a province in northwest France, and formed an independent Duchy of Brittany until the treaty of union in 1532. The group allegedly had strong allies with ETA (separatist group) as their struggles were almost the same.

== Ideology ==
While the ideology of FLB was unclear during its very early years, the group's overarching goal was Breton independence, considering their cause a part of the greater struggle of Celtic and European nations. The FLB believed that France had abused the treaty of 1532, as the treaty allowed Brittany to remain a legally separate duchy from France and thus retain a large degree of sovereignty, which was then gradually abolished by French centralism. The organization positioned itself as a fierce opponent of French unitary administration and affirmed that it would not exist in the first place "if the Bretons had the status that the English colonists gave to the Quebecois: autonomous government, elected assembly, compulsory teaching of the national language."

The FLB also included the ARB, whose name was inspired by the IRA and which was considered the armed wing of the FLB. The ARB called for armed struggle against the "French occupation of Brittany", though initially the group lacked a precise doctrine and had its members operate autonomously. This was changed by the publication of FLB's manifesto in late 1968, which called for the right of Bretons to own local means of production and argued that Brittany is a colony suffering under the foreign domination of France. The FLB wrote: "... We are in a typical colonial situation, where a handful of foreign capitalist entrepreneurs, represented by the French State, exploit and transform at their leisure, and for their own interests, the natural and human wealth of an indigenous community, powerless and enslaved, that is to say almost destroyed."

The organisation called itself socialist and called for 'indigenous socialism' in Brittany that would be "neither bureaucratic nor authoritarian", and was to be inspired by the Celtic heritage and tradition of Brittany. The FLB then steadily moved towards a more radical direction, though in September 1969 a Maoist faction left the organisation to form FLB-2, which then dissolved shortly afterwards to join the Breton Communist Party. On 29 May 1972 the FLB published a new manifesto which went further; instead of establishing indigenous socialism as the main ideology of the group, the new 1972 manifesto affirmed the FLB's dedication to Marxism instead. The document also included the name change of ARB - instead of Armee Republicaine Bretonne (Breton Republican Army), it was now known as the Armee Revolutionnaire Bretonne (Breton Revolutionary Army).

Breton separatism was particularly unique in its eagerness to establish international connections with other separatist movements across the world, and playing a very active role in Celtic movements. As early as 1911, Breton nationalists called for the need to "develop lines of friendship between all the Celtic peoples", and in 1927 Breton separatists held a conference in Rosporden which was also attended by representatives of the Alsatian, Corsican, Flemish and Celtic nationalist movements. While the declaration of the conference was very moderate and only called for extensive autonomy within France that would become "une fédération de peuples", the Breton delegation stated that the long-term goal is to go further, stating: "We believe that Europe is destined to form, sooner or later, an economic unity, and we see this transformation as the sole means of eliminating this universal calamity that is standing armies and wars. But we believe that this unity will not be a federation of the current states."

Strong Celtic and Pan-European currents in Breton nationalism made the FLB embrace these ideologies as well, infusing their separatism with "celticism and europeanism". However, support for European federation was never supported by the majority of FLB members, and was a minority view that considered Breton struggle for independence a part of a larger struggle for liberating all stateless nation of Europe and creating a federal or confederal structure, devoid of foreign domination. When interviewed, most FLB members confirmed that the organization was not pan-European, with one member stating: "We had to build a strategy of separation that would lead to total independence. It must also be said that in that era we were not interested at all in the construction of the European Union. Our preferred readings were The People’s War by Mao Zedong, The Rape of the Masses: The Psychology of Totalitarian Political Propaganda by Sergei Chakhotin, The Technique of Revolution by Malaparte."

Ultimately, the FLB followed "a philosophy more concerned with socialism worldwide than ethnonationalism and Europeanism". While sympathy for other separatist was common, and the FLB believed that its cause "was very connected to the international struggles in Paris, in relation with the Occitans and the Algerians", the organization did not share the vision of confoederal "Third Europe" of Yann Fouéré. In 1972, FLB and ETA released a joint declaration calling for the boycott of the French referendum on enlargement of the European Economic Community, rejecting the European Union as exploitative and bourgeois. Both organisations likewise stated: "The fight against imperialism and colonialism in the Western European subcontinent calls for determined and fundamental opposition to the Common Market. The national oppression and economic exploitation suffered by the Irish, Basque, and Breton people can do nothing in effect but worsen by the development of this vast and dangerous capitalist enterprise."

Nevertheless, the FLB was distinguished by its willingness to work together with other separatist organizations. It established contact with Basque Euskadi Ta Askatasuna in 1969, and became associated with the Provisional Irish Republican Army around the same time. All three groups exchanged intel, and in 1972 some Breton militants received training from ETA in the Pyrenees. The FLB also had its combatants trained by the far-left Irish Saor Éire. The organization also sought ties with revolutionary Cuba and contacted the Cuban government through Swiss embassy, but Cuba turned the Bretons down as it did not want to sour its relations with France. Surprisingly, the party was also allied to the Basque Nationalist Party, despite it being much more moderate than ETA. The FLB was also involved in the creation of the far-left Front de libération du Québec.

== History ==
Breton Nationalism had been a significant force in the early 20th century through the Breton National Party, but it has been discredited by its association with collaborationism in World War II. The FLB represented a new wave of nationalist politics associated with anti-colonialist ideology. The group claimed that Brittany was oppressed by France acting as a colonial power.

Citizens of Brittany, or, Bretons, retain their own national identity including an independent language from that of France, music, and other cultural details. Bretons are considered an ethnic Celtic group with their roots in Brittonic-speaking people from what is today Devon and Cornwall in Britain.

The group was linked to surviving members of earlier nationalist groups, notably Yann Goulet, who was operating from Ireland. The first known FLB attack occurred in June 1966 when a municipal tax office in Saint-Brieuc was bombed, and a note signed by the FLB claimed that they would continue to carry out a campaign of violence against these "occupying symbols of Brittany".

In the following years, the FLB carried out attacks against administrative structures, such as electrical installations, police barracks and statues, mainly by bombing them. The number of attacks peaked in 1968. However, the FLB ensured that no physical injuries or deaths would result from their attacks, which they wished to remain purely symbolic. In this they followed the model of the earlier group Gwenn ha du. They thus gained a reputation in the international community as the "smiling terrorists." There are even reports that the only two known FLB victims during this period were two FLB members themselves, who were killed while trying to defuse a bomb they were afraid would hurt civilians.

Factions in the FLB emerged in the early 1970s, leading to the creation of the militant Breton Revolutionary Army (Armée révolutionnaire bretonne, or ARB). This group acted separately from the FLB and proved to be the durable faction that still exists today. There were several Breton liberation groups that were distinct from the FLB.

== Activity ==
The first known FLB attack occurred in June 1966 when a municipal tax office in Saint-Brieuc was bombed, and a note signed by the FLB claimed that they would continue to carry out a campaign of violence against these "occupying symbols of Brittany." In the following years, the FLB carried out attacks against administrative structures, such as electrical installations, police barracks and statues—mainly by bombing them. Though the group peaked in 1968 there have been attacks reported as recently as 2014 using incineration tactics.

The FLB ensured that no physical injuries or deaths would result from their attacks, which they wished to remain purely symbolic; in this they followed the model of the earlier group Gwenn ha du, founded 1930. There are reports that the only two known FLB victims during this period were two FLB members themselves, who were killed while trying to defuse a bomb they were afraid may hurt civilians. They thus gained a reputation in the international community as the "smiling terrorists." The actions of the organization did not arise any moral disapproval of the Breton community, and the FLB enjoyed constant support of Breton nationalists.

One of their most notorious acts was the 1978 bombing of the Palace of Versailles.

=== Trials and police intervention ===
It was in 1969 that the police intervened, confiscating propaganda and weaponry. More than 60 people were arrested, those directly involved in previous attacks were given brief sentences, however within a few months many had been granted amnesty, or pardons, and released. Although created by young Bretons in the early 1960s, the FLB enjoyed popular support, evident during these arrests which revealed that members came from very diverse backgrounds: businessmen, housewives, students, farmers, and even clergy.

Though most had favorable outcomes for the organization, trials bolstered the Breton "liberation" movement as the trials were perceived to be further suppressive action by the government. This period was also marked with a rise in the number of students enrolling in Breton language courses, as being able to speak Breton was seen as legitimizing one's position as a Breton militant.

== Notable leaders ==
=== Yann Fouéré ===
Yann was a prominent force in the Breton Liberation Front, so much so that he fled to Ireland 1948, seeking political asylum. He was an author, businessman and, in some ways politician. In 1999 he formed the "Party for the Organization of Free Brittany" which he led until 2004.

Yann was involved in a "Pro-German witch Hunt" in 1944, where he was held in custody for a year. Upon escape, he was sheltered by fellow Nationalists in Wales. While hidden he was sentenced to life in prison and was forced out of Brittany and into the Republic of Ireland, where he secured citizenship. In 1955 he was given a retrial in France and came back, innocent, to form the "Movement for the Organization of Brittany."

In 1973 Yann ran for political office, lost, then was arrested two years later for involvement with the Breton Liberation Front's bombings. He was released conditionally until 1979 when he and 22 others were charged with security-related offences .

He died in Saint-Brieuc at 101 years old in 2011, where he spent his last days advocating for Breton Nationalism and avoiding being tried as a "wartime collaborator."

=== Pierre Le Moine ===
Pierre joined a resistance movement at 16 years old during the German occupation of France during which time he survived being captured by occupying forces. After the war in 1955 he co-founded the Breton Nationalist magazine Ar Vro and later Jeune Bretagne, becoming a regular contributor to Armor Magazine.

He was arrested during attacks by the Breton Liberation Front. After being freed he went into exile for many years in Jersey. He died at 96 years old in 2023 after a 68-year career as a founding member, vice-president, and president of the Federal Union of European Nationalities and its representative at the Council of Europe and OSCE.

=== Other notable leaders ===
- Yann Puillandre
- Dr Gourves
- Fr Le Breton

== See also ==
- Party for the Organization of a Free Brittany
- Attack of 7 August 1932 in Rennes
- The Roc'h Trédudon attack
