= Alcatel =

Former French telecommunications company

- Logo from 1987 until 2006.
- Type: public
- Traded as: Euronext: ACL NYSE: ACL
- Industry: Telecommunications
- Founded: 1898; 128 years ago (as Compagnie Générale d'Electricité); 1963; 63 years ago (as Société Alsacienne de Constructions Atomiques, de Télécommunications et d'Électronique) (Note: The company Alcatel was founded in 1970, but companies that merged into it were founded as early as 1898)
- Defunct: December 1, 2006; 19 years ago
- Fate: Renamed to Alcatel-Lucent after acquiring Lucent Technologies
- Headquarters: Paris, France
- Website: alcatel.com at the Wayback Machine (archived 2000-12-14)

Alcatel SA was a French industrial conglomerate that was active between 1963 and 2006. It had roots in Compagnie Générale d’Electricité (CGE, lit. "General Electricity Company"), a conglomerate founded in 1898 as an early state-owned cable and telephone equipment company that later expanded into construction, shipbuilding and energy. In telecommunications, Alcatel was a major supplier of digital telephone switches, terrestrial and submarine transmission cables, satellite equipment, cellular infrastructure, DSL access equipment and others.

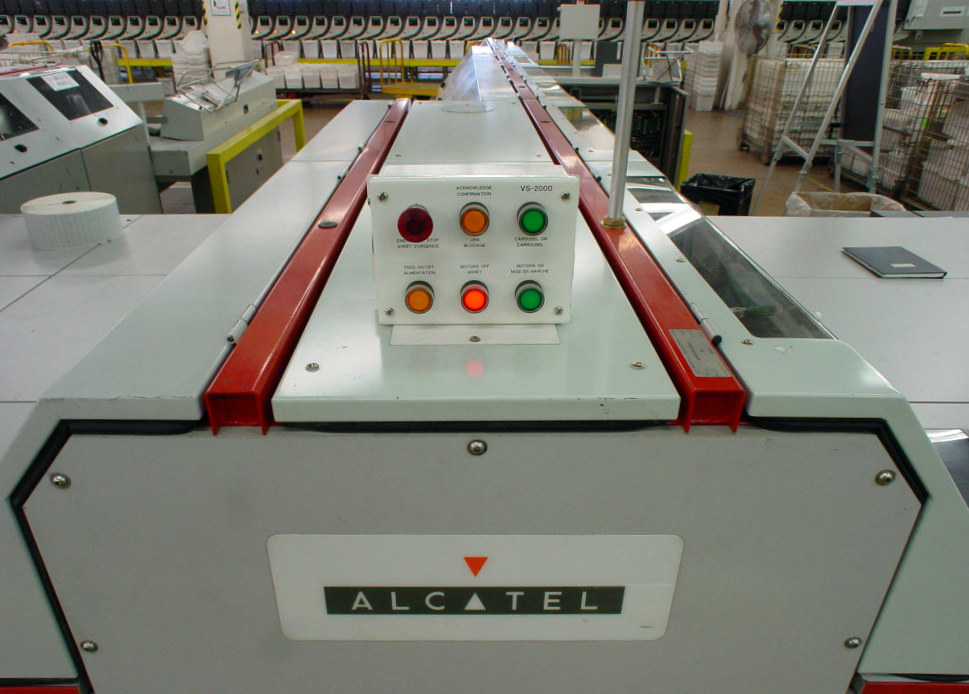
An Alcatel mail sorting machine

Alcatel (originally short for Société Alsacienne de Constructions Atomiques, de Télécommunications et d'Électronique; roughly translates as Alsatian Society of Atomic Constructions, Telecommunications and Electronics) was formed in Mulhouse as part of SACM, an engineering company group. During the late 1960s, the company was absorbed by Compagnie industrielle des télécommunications (CIT), the telecom division of the conglomerate CGE. CGE was nationalised by the French state in 1982, only to be privatised five years later. The firm was renamed to Alcatel Alsthom in 1991, and finally to just Alcatel in 1998 after divesting Alstom, the railway vehicle manufacturer, to focus solely on telecommunications.

In 2006, following the acquisition of the American telecom company Lucent Technologies, the company was renamed to Alcatel-Lucent S.A.. Ten years later, Alcatel-Lucent was itself absorbed into the Finnish telecoms specialist Nokia. Today, the Alcatel name survives in Alcatel Submarine Networks (telecomms), Alcatel-Lucent Enterprise (software), Alcatel Mobile (mobile telephones) and Atlinks (fixed-line telephones).

== History ==
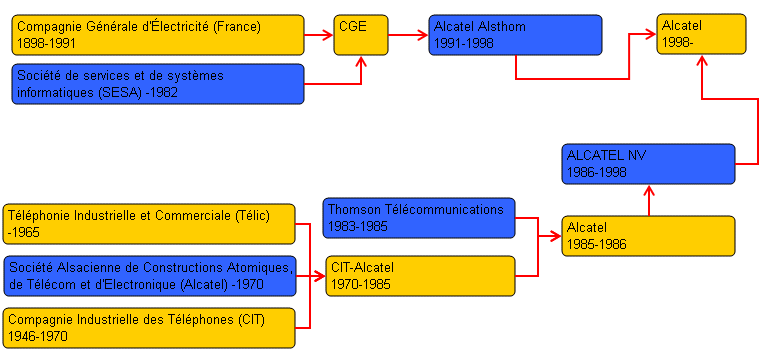
Chart showing company roots and mergers that led to Alcatel

=== Predecessors ===
In 1898, Pierre Azaria established the Compagnie Générale d'Électricité (CGE). In 1919, Aaron Weil created the "téléphone privé" (private telephone). In 1925, CGE became part of Compagnie Générale des Câbles de Lyon. Two years later, the expanding company adopted the name of "Téléphonie Industrielle et Commerciale" (TELIC). In 1928, Alsthom was formed by Société Alsacienne de Constructions Mécaniques and Compagnie Française Thomson-Houston.

During 1946, the CIT was created (Compagnie Industrielle de Téléphone) with CGE (Compagnie Generale d'Electricité). One year later, ALSATEL was founded (Société Alsacienne et Lorraine de Télécommunication et d'Electronique) to enable sales expansion. In 1952, in the United States, ITT Corporation bought a controlling interest in Kellogg Switchboard and Supply Company and rebranded its products to ITT Kellogg. In 1954, TELIC acquired COFRATEL (Compagnie Française du Téléphone). In 1960, TELIC made crossbar telephone exchanges. In 1965, CGE acquired TELIC, becoming a subsidiary of CIT. In 1969, CGE became the majority shareholder of Alsthom, leading to it being integrated into CGE's telecom arm, the Compagnie industrielle des télécommunications (CIT).

=== Formation and early activities ===
In 1970, Alcatel was created via the merger of CIT and ENTE, a department of the SACM (Société Alsacienne de Constructions Mécaniques). That same year, Ambroise Roux became the chairman of CGE; Roux subsequently became the honorary chairman and held this role until his death in 1999. In 1977, Alcatel's first private branch exchange (PBX) was created with digital controls. In 1980, the Minitel videotex service was launched. Two years later, CGE was nationalised by the French state under François Mitterrand. One year later, at the direction of the French Government, the telecoms activities of CGE were consolidated with those of another state-owned company, Thompson Telecommunications; it was this move that effectively created Alcatel. In 1984, Cables de Lyon acquired both Thompson Jeumont Cables and Kabelmetal. In 1985, Alsthom Atlantique was rebranded as Alsthom.

During 1986, ITT Corporation sold its international telecommunications and cable business (including ITT Kellogg) to Alsthom, creating Alcatel N.V., a Netherlands company in which ITT retained a 37 percent stake; this transaction positioned Alcatel N.V. as the world's second-largest telecommunications company at that time. A majority stake in Cables de Lyon became a subsidiary of Alcatel N.V. Pierre Suard became CGE chairman. In 1987, CGE was privatized, and Alsthom was awarded the contract to build the TGV Atlantique high speed train for the Northern TGV network. During 1989, CGE and the British General Electric Company formed GEC Alsthom, which better enabled Alsthom to sell its products outside France. That same year, CGEE-Alsthom became Cegelec.

During 1991, CGE changed its name to Alcatel Alsthom and acquired Rockwell Technologies' transmission equipment division. That same year, Cables de Lyons was renamed Alcatel Cable and acquired AEG Kabel for $586 million, while Alcatel acquired Italian telecommunication systems specialist Telettra. In 1992, Alcatel Alsthom acquired AEG Kabel while ITT Corporation sold its remaining stake in Alcatel N.V. for around $3.6 billion. They also acquired British undersea cable manufacturer STC Submarine Systems from Nortel Networks a year later. In 1994, Alcatel Networks Systems received the Shingo Prize for Excellence in Manufacturing at the Richardson, Texas, Longview, Texas, Raleigh, North Carolina, Clinton, North Carolina, and Nogales, Mexico locations.

=== Telecommunications focus ===
In 1995, Serge Tchuruk was appointed chairman and CEO of Alcatel Alsthom, after which he reoriented the company to focus on telecommunications equipment. Two years later, Alcatel Telecom received IndustryWeek's Best Plants award for the Raleigh, North Carolina, USA plant under Alcatel Network Systems. In 1998, Alcatel and Alsthom were split; Alsthom GEC became Alstom through an initial public offering (which left Alcatel retaining a 24 percent stake), while Alcatel divested Cegelec to the newly formed Alstom. That same year, Alcatel acquired DSC Communications in exchange for $4.4 billion as well as Packet Engines. In 1999, Alcatel acquired Xylan, Assured Access and Internet Devices; Alcatel also increased its stake in the French electronics specialist Thomson CSF to 25.3 percent, and decreased its stake in the nuclear reactor specialist Framatome to 8.6 percent.

In 2000, Alcatel divested its DSL modem business to Thomson Multimedia and acquired several other firms, including Newbridge, Genesys and Innovative Fibers. Furthermore, Alcatel spun off its cable unit into Nexans. One year later, Alcatel sold its remaining stake in Alstom, and opted to repurchase its Alcatel Space investment from Thales while reducing its stake in Thales to 20.03 percent and selling its 2.2 percent stake in Areva. In 2002, Alcatel acquired Astral Point Communications Inc. and Telera Corporation, and took control of Alcatel Shanghai Bell. Alcatel also sold its microelectronic business to STMicroelectronics, its stake in Thomson, 10.3M shares of Thales, and 1.5M shares of Nexans.

During 2003, Alcatel acquired iMagicTV, and TiMetra Inc; the firm sold its optical business to Avanex, as well as a 50 percent stake in Atlinks. In 2004, Alcatel acquired eDial Inc. It also formed a joint venture with the Chinese electronics company TCL: Alcatel Mobile Phones, in which Alcatel held a 45 percent stake. Furthermore, Alcatel and Draka Holdings formed another joint venture: Draka Comteq B.V., in which Alcatel held a 49.9 percent stake. That same year, Alcatel also finalized its acquisition of Spatial Wireless and sold 7.1M shares of Avanex. During 2005, Alcatel disposed of its 45 percent stake in the Alcatel Mobile Phones venture back to TCL.

In 2006, Alcatel acquired the American telecom company Lucent Technologies and the company name became Alcatel-Lucent S.A.. Alcatel-Lucent itself was absorbed into Nokia in 2016.

== See also ==
- French Joint Strike
