= Yann Goulet =

Breton-Irish sculptor, nationalist, and Axis collaborator

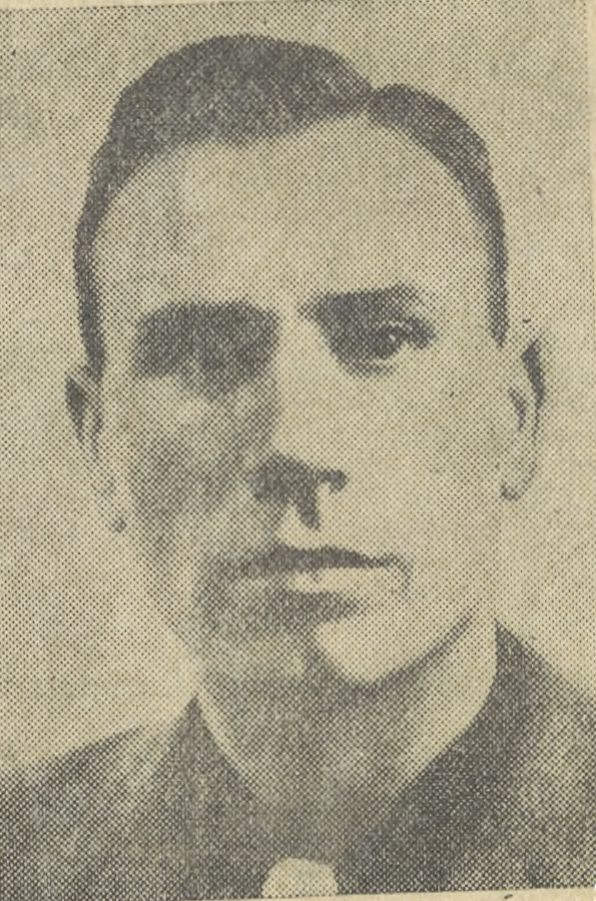
- Born: 20 August 1914; Saint-Nazaire, France
- Died: 22 August 1999 (aged 85); Bray, County Wicklow, Ireland
- Known for: Sculpture

Yann Goulet (or Yann Renard-Goulet; 20 August 1914 – 22 August 1999) was a Breton sculptor, Breton nationalist and alleged war-time collaborationist with Nazi Germany who headed the Breton Bagadou Stourm militia. He later took Irish citizenship and became a professor of sculpture at the Royal Hibernian Academy.

== Early career ==
Yann Renard-Goulet was born in Saint-Nazaire on 20 August 1914. His father, Gustave Goulet, was a hotelier and chef. Before World War II, he was a member of the Breton National Party, and a former member of the French Section of the Workers' International (SFIO). His artistic career began at the École nationale supérieure des Beaux-Arts, where he studied art and architecture and learned sculpture with Auguste Rodin's assistant, Charles Despiau. His works in France include bas-reliefs shown at the Exposition International de Paris (1938), and the monument to the youth of the French empire in Lille (1939). He was part of the Breton artistic movement Seiz Breur.

Goulet's involvement in Breton nationalism led to accusations that he had orchestrated the destruction of the Monument to the Breton-Angevin Federation at Pontivy on 18 December 1938 by Gwenn ha du, the nationalist terrorist group. He was detained but then released.

=== Bagadou Stourm ===
Later in the war, he joined the assault section of Bagadou Stourm, Breton nationalist stormtroopers alleged to be allied to the Germans. He also collaborated with the pro-Nazi nationalist newspaper L'Heure Bretonne. In 1941 in Paris, he became head of Bagadou Stourm and the "Youth Organizations" of the Parti National Breton.

== Artistic career in Ireland ==
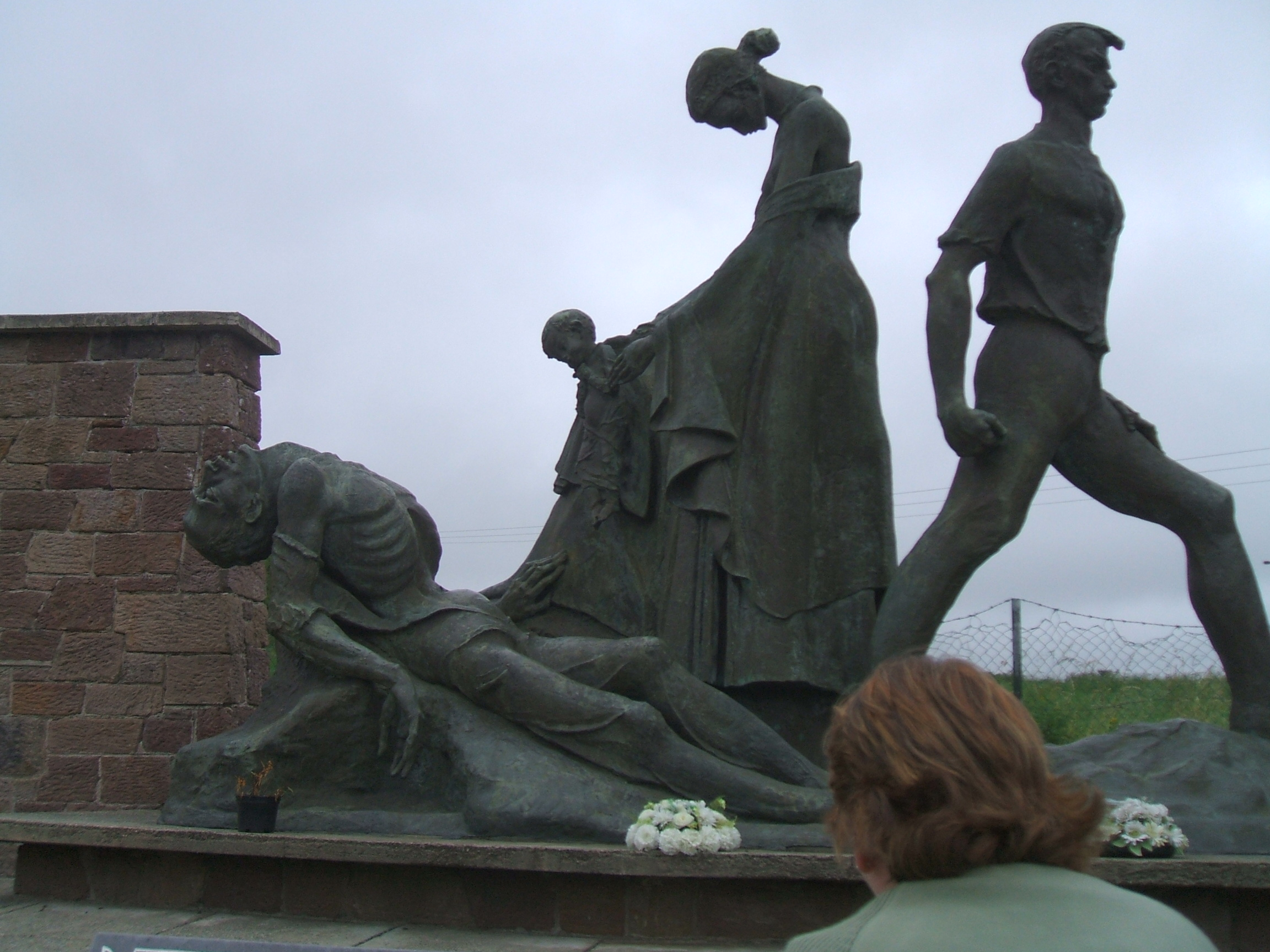
Yann Goulet's Ballyseedy Memorial, County Kerry, Ireland

After the liberation of France, Goulet travelled with his wife Vonig and two young children to Ireland, and was sentenced to death as a Collaborationist by a French court in his absence. The painter Camille Souter took up sculpture in 1950 under his guidance.

He acquired Irish citizenship in 1952 and became an art professor, having first worked making concrete blocks and running art classes in the evenings. His third child, Brigid, was born in Ireland.

He was commissioned to create public works commemorating the IRA and other republicans, including the Custom House Memorial (Dublin), the East Mayo Brigade IRA Memorial, the Republican Memorial (Crossmaglen), and the Ballyseedy Memorial (Kerry). He exhibited regularly at the Royal Hibernian Academy, eventually becoming the RHA Professor of Sculpture. He was also made a member of Aosdána in 1983.

In 1981, he travelled to Belfast to take a death mask of hunger-striker, Bobby Sands, but the local Belfast IRA leadership refused the plan.

== Liberation Front of Brittany ==
Towards the end of the 1960s, he claimed to have taken the reins of the Liberation Front of Brittany (Front de Libération de la Bretagne, or FLB) and to have been behind all their attacks.

In 1969, he became secretary general and chair of the Comité National de la Bretagne Libre and published the communiques of the FLB. His friends called him "tonton Yann", but sceptics referred to him as "Général micro". Goulet often claimed "[there was a] national revolution that we missed in 1940" (révolution nationale qu'on a manquée en 1940).

== Death ==
Goulet died in Bray, County Wicklow, on 22 August 1999, two days after his 85th birthday. A former president of the RHA commented after his death that he " never pretended to be a genius but I'd give him the highest accolade I could give anyone: he was competent. That's a rare quality".
