= Xavier Haas =

French painter and engraver (1907–1950)

The Disembarkation of Jean IV, Dinard, 3 August 1379. An illustration to Danio's history of Brittany

Xavier Haas (1907–1950) was a French painter and engraver. Though born in Paris of Alsacian descent, he is most associated with Breton nationalist art and design.

== Early life ==
When he was a child Haas contracted polio in Alsace, which partly disabled him. Shortly afterwards his father was gassed during World War I.

In 1919 he was taken to Sarzeau, in Morbihan Brittany, for a long stay in the hamlet of Lan Hoëdic to recuperate from the effects of polio. While there he met Xavier de Langlais, who became his lifelong friend. Haas participated in the founding of the Association des paralysés de France (French Association of the Paralyzed) and its newspaper Faire Face (Face Up).

== Brittany ==
Haas studied at the Ecole des Beaux Arts in Paris. Returning to Brittany, he joined the Breton nationalist art movement Seiz Breur in 1936. At the Exposition Internationale de Paris in 1937, he created a "diorama of Brittany" for the Pavilion of Brittany. He also participated in the Breton Christian Art Workshop, founded in 1929 by James Bouillé and Xavier de Langlais. As part of their work in 1936 he created the frames for the Stations of the Cross of the church Our Lady of La Baule (Loire-Atlantique).

As an illustrator, Haas produced mostly monochrome engravings, but also made multi-block colour prints. He illustrated over 60 stories in the journal "La Bretagne" and a large number of stories and poems in the children's magazine "Ololé". He also illustrated Danio's history of Brittany.

Along with other members of Seiz Breur, during World War II Haas was associated with the collaborationist Breton National Party. He illustrated their literature during this period.

He had a specially close friendship with the composer Georges Arnoux and the Alsatian painter Georges Cornelius, who was based at Ploubazlanec in Brittany. Xavier de Langlais said of him, "Beneath his frail appearance, he hid a heart of rare richness. His heart was simple and its affection certain. He was, above all, a friend."
