= Florian Le Roy =

French journalist and writer

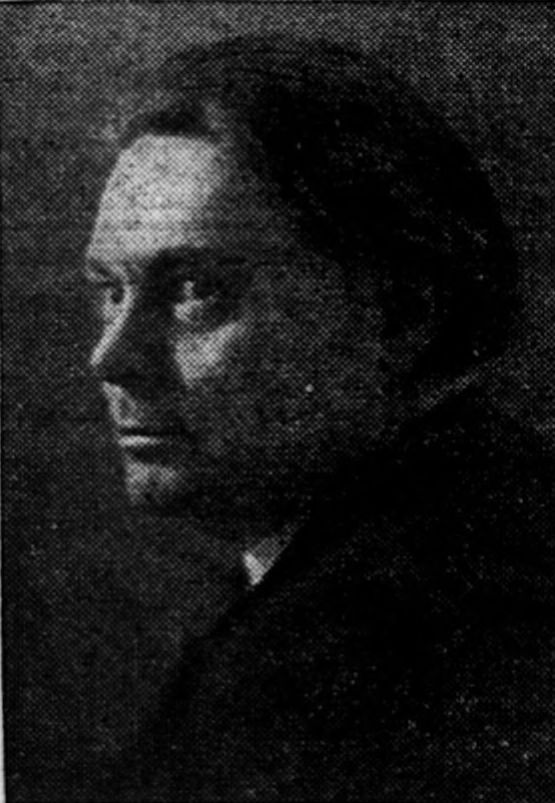
- Le Roy in 1939
- Born: 8 May 1901; Pléneuf-Val-André (Côtes-du-Nord)
- Died: 6 March 1959 (aged 57)
- Occupations: Journalist; Writer

Florian Le Roy (8 May 1901 – 6 March 1959) was a 20th-century French journalist and writer.

Le Roy was secretary-treasurer of the Académie de Bretagne and member of the Celtic Institute of Brittany in 1941. During the Second World War, he worked as presenter for Radio Rennes Bretagne.

== Selected publications ==
- 1927: Bonne sœur des chemins, prize of the Société des gens de lettres
- 1935: Guénolé
- 1936: Les Châteaux de Bretagne, foreword by Alphonse de Chateaubriant, illustrations by Pierre Le Trividic, Rouen, Éditions H. Defontaine
- 1937: Pays de Bretagne, prix du tourisme Breton
- 1942: « Pour une génération d'artistes », in L'Ouest-Éclair, article about the students of the École régionale des beaux-arts de Rennes
- 1944: Vieux métiers bretons, illustrations by Mathurin Méheut, reprint 2011, ISBN 978-2-84346-444-7
- 1946: L'Oiseau volage, Prix Cazes 1947
- 1948: En passant par la Bretagne, illustrations by Pierre Péron and Xavier de Langlais
- 1948: Bretagne des Saints, illustrations by Jos Le Doaré
- 1950: La seconde mort, Éditions de Flore - Éditions Horay
- Les Côtes de Bretagne, illustrations by Pierre Le Trividic, Éditions H. Defontaine
- Le Péché d'être heureux, novel, in the monthly literary review Les œuvres libres, volume 169

== See also ==
- Seiz Breur
