= List of works by Francis Renaud =

Francis Renaud
- Born: 26 November 1887; Saint-Brieuc
- Died: 1973 (aged 85–86); Saint-Brieuc
- Occupation: Sculptor

This is a listing of the main works of Francis Renaud who was a French sculptor born in Saint-Brieuc on 26 November 1887 and who died there in 1973. Strongly influenced by Breton tradition he was an active member of Seiz Breur along with the Breton sculptors Jean Freour, Yann Goulet, Jules-Charles Le Bozec and Raffig Tullou

== "la Bretonne du Goëlo" ==
This Renaud sculpture stands in Saint-Brieuc's parc des promenades.

== Monument to Yves Le Trocquer in Pontrieux ==
Yves Le Trocquer was born in Pontrieux and was the parliamentary deputy for Côtes-d'Armor from 1919 to 1930 and served as the Minister of Public works in seven successive governments.

== Monument to Anatole Le Braz at the Lycée de St-Brieuc ==
Renaud created a commemorative column featuring sculptures of four people who represented the principal themes of Le Braz' writing, interspersed by bas-reliefs of Celtic crosses and the coat of arms of Saint-Brieuc. The four sculptures represent a begging Breton with his crutches and parchment, a Breton of Trégor with hand on heart, a sailor in sou'wester with pieces of fish, and a woman of Breton replete with a widow's cloak and hood

== Tréguier War Memorial ==
Tréguier War Memorial

This war memorial is known as "La Pleureuse". Renaud had used Marie-Louise Le Put as a model for his sculpture. She wears mourning clothes with a large hood or cowl covering her head ("Capuche" in French ). The sculpture was commissioned in 1920, shown in 1921 at the Salon des Artistes and the memorial was inaugurated on 2 July 1922. At that time the sculpture was known as "Douleur".

== "Vonnick" ==
This terracotta statue (60 cm tall) is located in the town hall of the commune of Perros-Guirec. It depicts a young girl from Logonna-Daoulas in Finistère wearing Breton dress. The work was created in 1927. A plaster version of the work can be seen in the Musée d'Art et d'Histoire in Saint-Brieuc.

== Étables-sur-Mer War Memorial ==
The war memorial in Étables-sur-Mer in Côtes-d'Armor takes the form of a menhir with Renaud's sculpture of a soldier standing in the front whilst at the rear is a Latin cross and an anchor. Plaques in bronze list the dead of the 1914–1918 and 1939–1945 wars as well as the conflicts in Indochina and Algeria.

== Langast War Memorial ==
The memorial was inaugurated on 27 January 1924. Renaud's bronze profile of a helmeted soldier is at the base of the obelisk.

== Trévé War Memorial ==
This memorial stands in Trévé's place de la Mairie and comprises a monument bearing a list of names in letters of gold, next to which is Renaud's sculpture of a woman.

== Plœuc-sur-Lié War Memorial ==
251 men from this small commune lost their lives in the 1914-1918 war. Originally a German cannon was placed by the monument but this was taken back by the Germans in 1940.

== "L'Hiver" ==
Renaud's sculpture "L'Hiver" ("Winter") is one of four sculptures in the foyer of the Théâtre national de Chaillot in Paris. It depicts the four seasons. The work was also known as "La Frileuse".

== "Veuves d’Islandais" ==
Renaud had the idea of creating a monument honouring Pierre Loti which would be inspired by two characters from Loti's "Pêcheur d’Islande", Moan and Gaud Mevel learning of Yann Goas' drowning, and presented his plaster model to the Salon des artistes français in 1932 winning a gold medal. Several versions were then made in terracotta. Then Renaud produced a much larger maquette of the work, 2 metres high, and this is held by the Musée de Saint-Brieuc. For many years the Association Pierre Loti in Paimpol toyed with the idea of having a monument created using the maquette as a model and it appears that this project is now well advanced.

== l'Ephebe ==
A 1948 statue of a naked youth is dedicated to the pupils of the Collège Anatole Le Braz in Saint-Brieuc who had been deported and killed by the Nazis.

== Monument Lamennais ==
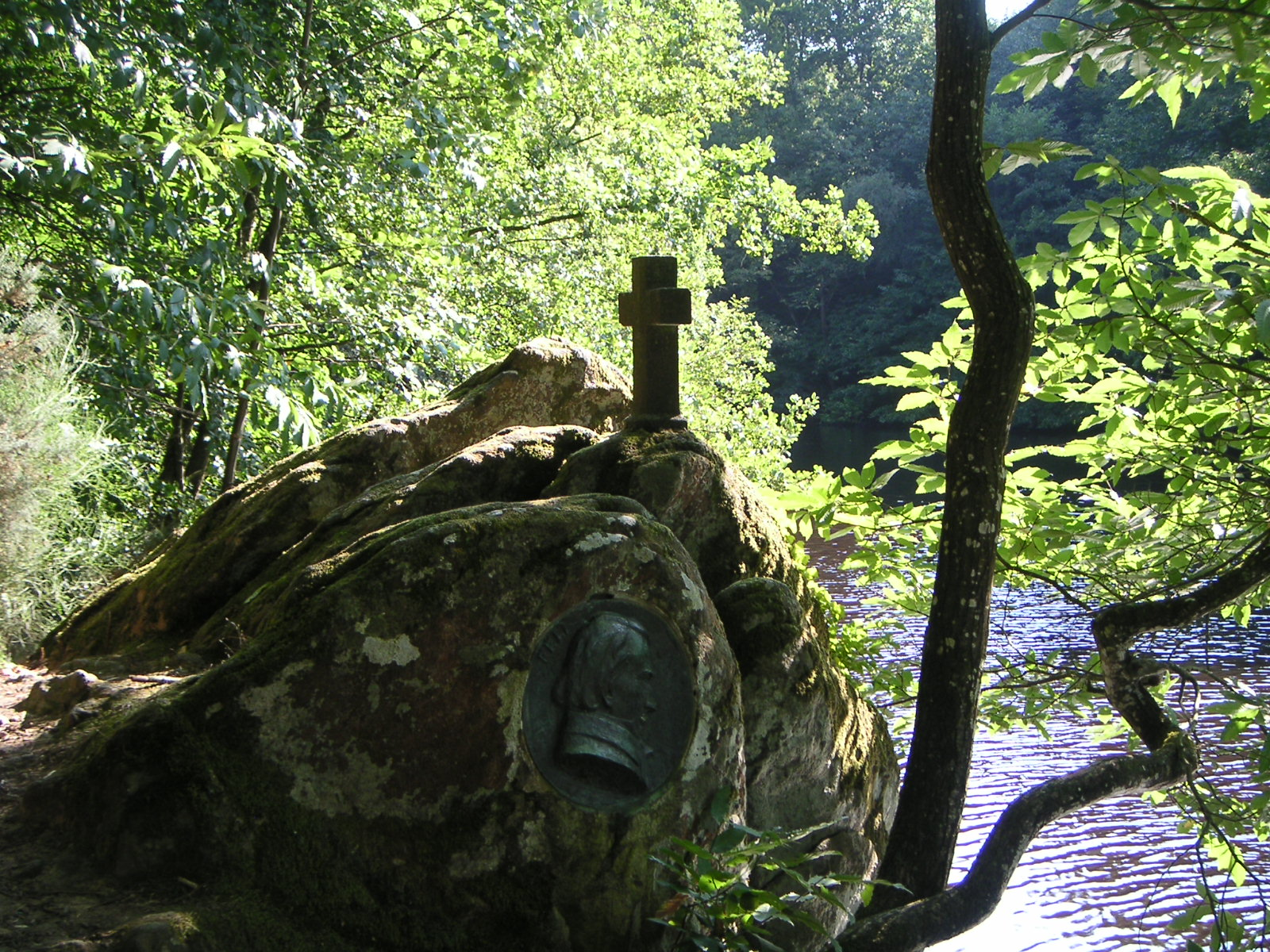
Lamennais memorial by a lake in Chesnale wood

This monument is located in Saint-Pierre-de-Plesguen's Chesnale wood and honours Félicité Robert de Lamennais, the French Catholic priest, philosopher, and political theorist. A bronze medallion depicting de Lamennais and executed by Renaud is attached to a large rock in an idyllic setting by a lake in the wood. A cross is fixed to the top of the rock. The memorial was inaugurated on 10 September 1922.

== Saint-Brieuc War Memorial ==
This war memorial, erected in 1923, stands in Saint-Brieuc's Boulevard de la Chalotais and honours the 670 men of the commune who were killed in the 1914-1918 war. Renaud sculpted a winged female figure which stands on a pedestal inscribed

"la ville de SAINT-BRIEUC A SES MORTS de la GRANDE GUERRE 1914-1918"

On either side of the pedestal a semi-circular wall is inscribed with the names of the dead. Subsequently reference to the 1939-1945 was added.

== Ploufragan War Memorial ==
This was the first war memorial to use a Renaud sculpture and features a standing soldier. It dates to 1920.

== Plussulien War Memorial ==
This war memorial also involves a Renaud sculpture of a standing soldier. 104 men from Plussulien died in the two World Wars, most of them in the 1914-1918 war.

== The offering to St Yves ("offrande à saint Yves") ==
This Renaud plaster sculpture of Ivo of Kermartin can be seen in Tréguier's townhall. It dates to 1955.

== Monument to Maréchal Foch ==
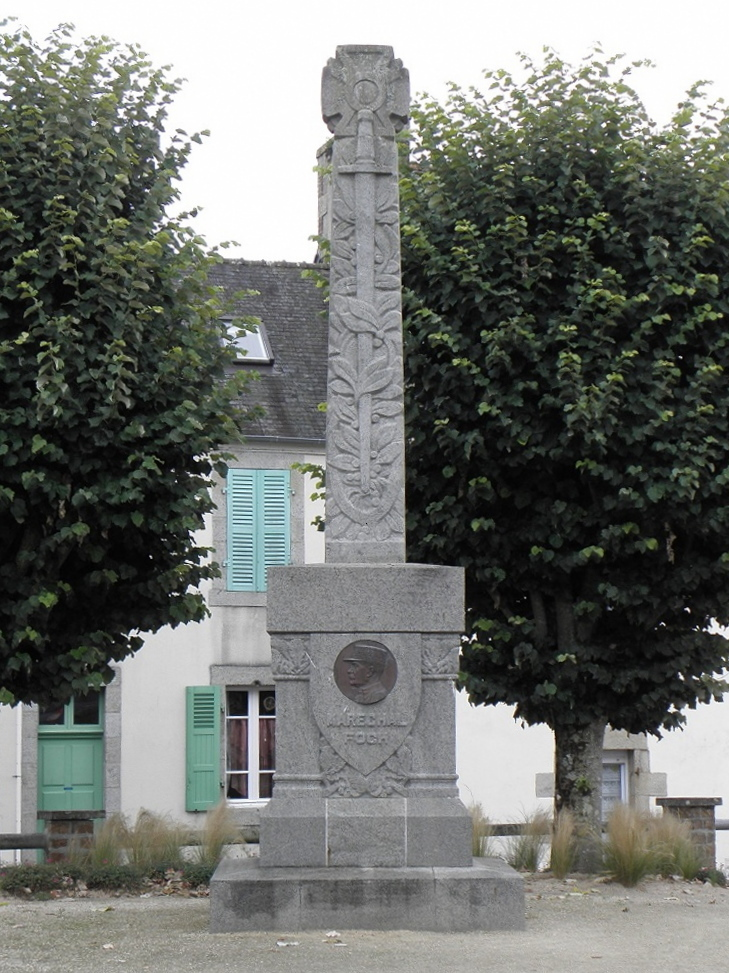
Monument to Maréchal Foch

The monument to Ferdinand Foch in Ploujean in Morlaix has a bronze medallion showing Foch in profile; it has been attributed to Renaud.
