= Marv Pontkalleg =

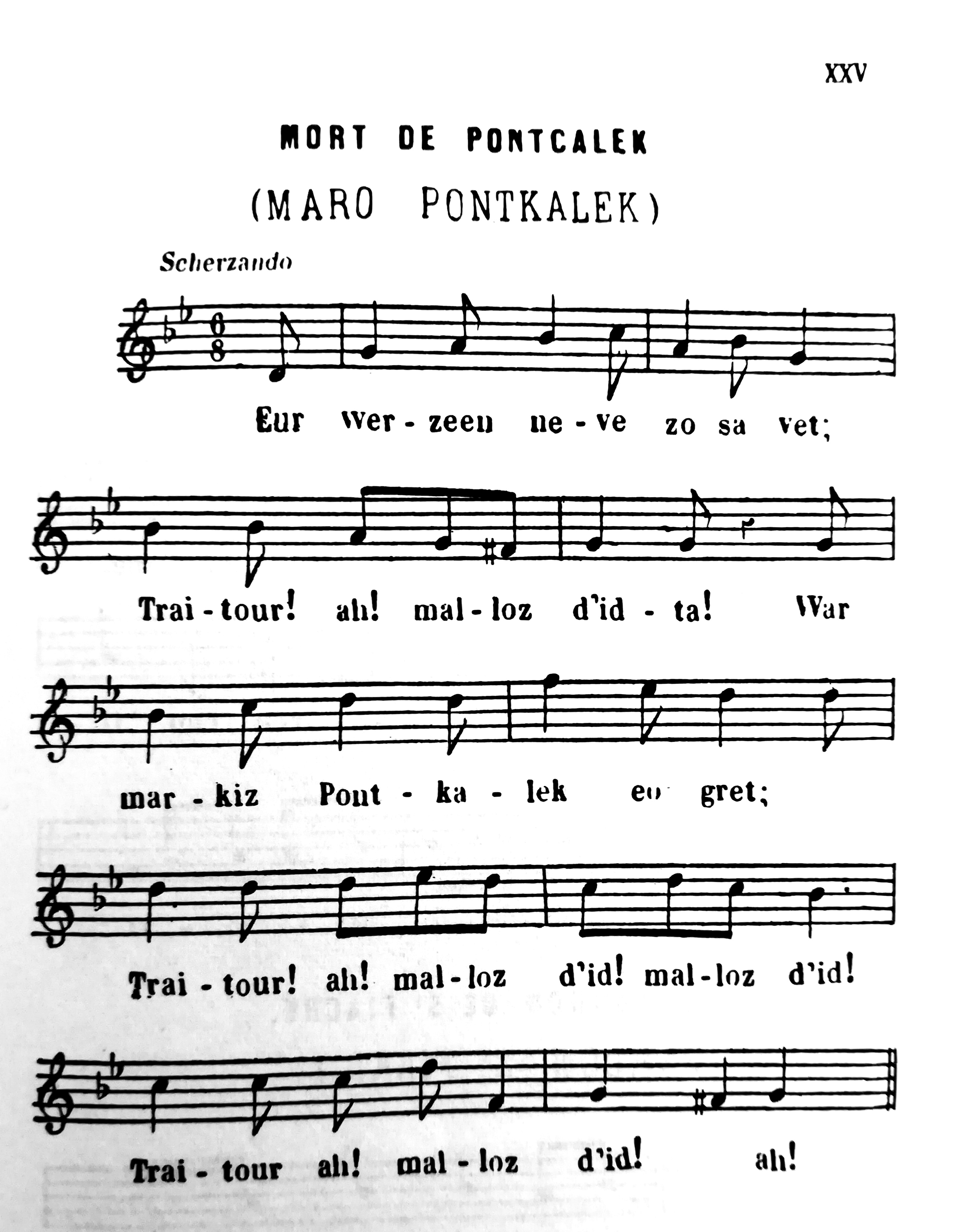
Maro Pontkalek, from the 1867 edition of Barzaz Breiz

"Marv Pontkalleg" (The Death of Pontcallec) is a traditional gwerz, included as no. XLVI in Barzaz Breiz, a book of traditional Breton songs collected in Cornouaille, Brittany, in the 19th century by Théodore Hersart de la Villemarqué. The death of the Marquis de Pontcallec following a conspiracy against the kingdom of France, is an authentic historical incident recounted by Hersart De La Villemarqué in the Barzaz Breiz; this version praises the militant and valiant nobility of his country in opposition to the bourgeoisie. "Marv Pontkalleg" is one of the classics of Breton music, and has been recorded many times by, among others, Gilles Servat, Tri Yann, Alan Stivell, Andrea Ar Gouilh and Jacques Pellen.

== Content ==
This gwerz tells the story of the Marquis de Pontcallec (1679–1720), beheaded on the Place du Bouffay in Nantes in 1720 as the leader of a Breton conspiracy against France. It is divided into four parts:

- the first part introduces the story and recounts the attachment of the people to their young marquis.
- the second recounts the denunciation of Pontcallec.
- the following part narrates the arrest of the marquis, his journey to Nantes, and his judgment.
- the last part describes the sadness of the population at the announcement of the death of the hero, through the reaction of the rector of Berné, in which parish the château of Pontcallec lies.

== La Villemarqué's edition ==
"Marv Pontkalleg" was first published in the second edition of Barzaz Breiz in 1845. La Villemarqué did not name his source for this song, and he long lay under the suspicion of having written it himself. However, its similarities with other Breton ballads on the same subject (29 were counted in 2008) together with the publication of La Villemarqué's notebooks have made it clear that large parts of the gwerz, at any rate, are authentic. The notes with which his edition is furnished interpret the Pontcallec conspiracy as a nationalist rising by the heroic nobility and peasantry intended to achieve Breton independence. This ahistorical interpretation was repeated by Arthur de la Borderie and later by Jeanne Coroller-Danio and other commentators in the Breton nationalist movement.

== Discography ==
- Alan Cochevelou (1964). Telenn geltiek: Harpe celtique (LP). Mouez Breiz. 3344.
- Gilles Servat (1972). Gilles Servat (LP). Kelenn. 6332 876.

- A performance of the song by Gilles Servat also figures on the soundtrack of Bertrand Tavernier's film Que la fête commence (1975).

- Tri Yann (1973). Dix ans, dix filles (LP). Kelenn. 6332 628.
- Andrea Ar Gouilh (1977). Gwerziou ha soniou ar bobl (LP). Arfolk. SB 362.
- Soazig (1989). Chant et harpe celtiques (CD). Buda Musique. 824482.
- Barzaz (1992). An den kozh dall (CD). Keltia Musique. KMCD 29.
- Jakez François (1994). Harpe celtique (CD). Griffe. GRI 19051 2.
- Glaz (1998). Holen ar bed/Le sel de la terre (CD). BMG France. 74321535382.
- Jacques Pellen (1999). Les tombées de la nuit (CD). Naïve. Y 225 080.
- Dominig Bouchaud (2002). L'ancre d'argent (CD). Keltia Musique. KMCD 127.
- Bardou (2005). A Feather upon the Shore (CD). Chamber. CH CD 311.
- Daonet (2012). Donemat (CD). Coop Breizh. CD DAO002.
