= Pierre Abadie =

French painter and ceramist (1896–1972)

Pierre Abadie (August 22, 1896, in Paris – September 23, 1972), also known as Pierre Abadie-Landel, was a French painter, wood engraver, and ceramicist.

== Biography ==
Born on August 22, 1896, in the 6th arrondissement of Paris, Pierre Abadie-Landel came from a family of Breton origin. He studied at the École des Beaux-Arts in Paris and held his first solo exhibition at the André gallery in Paris.

With his series of illustrations titled "L'alphabet de l'armée" and his drawings for the magazine "Le Nouvel Essor" in 1916, he is one of the important illustrators of World War I. Starting in 1920, he began exhibiting as a painter at the Salon des Indépendants in Paris.

He worked as a draftsman at the OMA architectural agency. As a decorator he collaborated with Parisian publishing houses.

As a member of the Seiz Breur group ("Seven Brothers") from 1923, he participated in International Exhibition of Modern Decorative and Industrial Arts in 1925. He created a series of ceramic plates in collaboration with the HB pottery factory in Quimper. He also exhibited toys at the Breton pavilion in the Trégor room. After the 1925 exhibition and the death of his friend Jeanne Malivel, he gradually distanced himself from the group, but he was still listed as a full member in the catalog for the exhibition in Saint-Nazaire during the summer of 1927.

Throughout his career as a painter, he had numerous exhibitions. His preferred themes were maritime Brittany, particularly Douarnenez, which he frequented for forty years, nudes and the world of the circus.

He died on September 23, 1972, in the 14th arrondissement of Paris. He was buried in the Cimetière parisien de Bagneux (95th division).

== Publications ==
"The Army Alphabet - R.A.T., Le Nouvel Essor, 1916."

== Exhibitions ==
- Ar Seiz Breur (1923–1947), a beautiful artistic saga, traveling exhibition, museums of Rennes (November 2000–January 2001), Nantes (February–April 2001), Quimper, Saint-Brieuc, Le Faouët (May 2002).
- The Passion for Printmaking – The Denise Delouche Collection, Vannes, Musée de la Cohue, from June to September 2008.
- Trait d'union – Design in Brittany, past and present, Saint-Grégoire, Mica Gallery, from October 2010 to January 2011.
- In War – French Illustrators and World War I, University of Chicago Library (Illinois), October 2014 – January 2015.
- The Great War as Recorded through Fine and Popular Arts, Morley College, London, August 2014.

== Works in Public Collections ==
=== United States ===
- Lawrence, Kansas, University of Kansas, Spencer Museum of Art: "The Military Nurse," lithograph, donated by Professor Eric Gustav Carlson.
- Philadelphia, University of Pennsylvania, Kislak Center for Special Collections, Rare Books, and Manuscripts.

=== France ===
- Paris, National Center for Visual Arts.
- Cinémathèque française: four drawings (1931) for the poster of the film "La Croix du Sud" by André Hugon (1932).
- Ministry of Defense: "Port de Douarnenez" and "Avant-port à Tréboul," oil on canvas.
- Quimper, Musée Départemental Breton.
- Saint-Aigulin, Town Hall: "Sur le port de Douarnenez," drawing.
- Vannes, Musée de la Cohue: engravings, including "Le Débarquement des sardines," donated by Denise Delouche.
