= James Bouillé =

French architect (1894–1945)

James Bouillé (14 February 1894 – 22 June 1945) was a French architect from Brittany.

== Biography ==
Bouillé was born in Guingamp (Côtes-d'Armor) He studied at the École des Beaux-Arts in Paris, until he was mobilized after the outbreak of the First World War in 1914. After the war, he became a member of the Breton nationalist political movement Breiz Atao.

He was one of the founders in 1923 of the artistic movement Seiz Breur, along with Jeanne Malivel and René-Yves Creston. His aim was to revitalise Breton sacred art: crosses, votive objects and traditional crafts. He also designed and supported pottery, ceramics, embroidery and cabinetmaking. Between 1924 and 1935, he was an architect in Perros-Guirec, where he developed a successful practice building holiday villas.

In 1929 he joined with Xavier de Langlais to found An Droellen, a workshop of Breton Christian art. The duo worked closely together on a number of projects, including the college chapel of St. Joseph in Lannion. The workshop included among its members Mlle Ménard (glazier), Madame Planiol (restoration of priestly vestments) and Jules-Charles Le Bozec (sculptor).

In the late 1930s Bouillé created the Chapel of Koat-Keo in Scrignac (Finistère), built at the initiative of his friend Abbot Jean-Marie Perrot, founder of the Breton Catholic youth organization Bleun-Brug, which promoted traditional Breton culture. The chapel is seen as a significant attempt to create a distinctive modern Breton sacred architecture, and was listed as a historical monument in 1997.

During the World War II, Perrot and Breun-Blug were suspected of collaborationist activity. In 1941, Bouillé was made director of Bleun-Brug and sat on the Advisory Committee of Brittany, as its representative. The committee was seen by resistance activists as part of the collaborationist régime. At this time he advocated a radical plan to build a new Breton capital city to be called "Brittia", which would be a "Celtic Brasilia" on the shores of Lake Guerlédan. Due to his association with Perrot and the committee, he was interned after the Liberation of France. He died in 1945, as a result of his internment.

In Brittany, at least nine streets bear his name.

== Major buildings ==
- 1933: holiday home, known as Kelenn, 18 chemin de Quo-Vadis, subdivision of Tourony-plage at Tégastel
- 1936-1937: Chapelle de l'Institution Saint-Joseph (in fact Saint-Joseph college) in Lannion
- 1937: Chapel Koat-Keo at Scrignac, created for the Abbot Perrot, with sculptures by Jules-Charles Le Bozec. (This building was designated as a Monument historique in 1997).
- 1938: Extension to the chapelle de Ploumanac'h, commune de Perros-Guirec 1938
- 1939: maison de villégiature (holiday home), known as Avel Dro, 2 rue du Belvédère à Trestrignel, commune de Perros-Guirec.

== Publications ==
- Sketla Segobrani. 3 levr moulet e ti René Prud'homme. Saint-Brieuc, (1923), 3 volumes (with François Vallée, Meven Mordiern, Émile Ernault)
- Sketla segobrani kenta nevrenn: dis atir, teutatis. Prud'homme - Saint-Brieuc (1923).
- Sketla segobrani eil kevrenn: trede levr: lugus. Prud'homme - Saint-Brieuc (1923).
- De l'art celtique et de l'utilité de son étude pour la création d'un art breton moderne. Buhez Breiz - Quimper (1924). Paper delivered at the congress of Bleun Brug at Lesneven 12 September 1923.
- L'art en Bretagne. Éditions de Buhez Breiz (1924). Paper delivered at the Panceltic Congress, Quimper, 9 September 1924.
- Sketla segobrani pevare [trede] kevrenn: tanaris, esus. Prud'homme - Saint-Brieuc (1925).
- Habitation bretonne. Massin Ch. et Cie - Paris (1926). The Regional Art of France
- L'architecture bretonne moderne. Éditions Romanance - Paris (1936).

== Bibliography ==
Audaces et hésitations d'un militant: James Bouillé, Pierre Mardaga - Liege. 1986.

Catalogue of the exhibition: Modernité et régionalisme: Bretagne : 1918 - 1945.
