= Meven Mordiern =

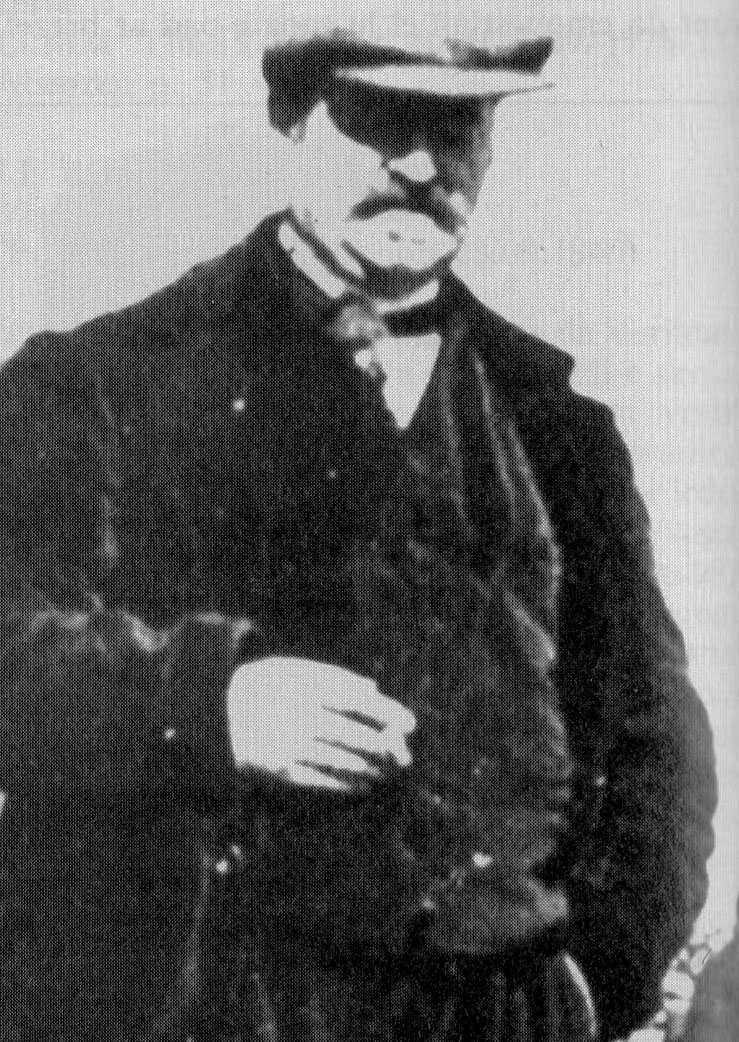

Meven Mordiern, the pen name of René Le Roux (29 October 1878 – 4 February 1949), was a Breton writer of French origin, and a specialist on the ancient Celtic culture. He was the main collaborator of the lexicographer François Vallée, who created the most complete dictionary of the Breton language in the first part of the 20th century. During the interwar period he was very influential in the Breton movement.

== Biography ==
Le Roux was born on 29 October 1878 into a wealthy Bordeaux family, with no identifiable Breton origin. His father, an army medical officer, moved after his retirement in March 1882 to Villiers-sur-Loir near Vendôme (Loir-et-Cher), where Le Roux lived with his parents until March 1891. From 1891 to 1897 he continued his studies at the Lycée Condorcet in Paris, where he lived until 1920, apart from a stay in London to learn English from July 1898 to June 1899. He devoted his entire life to studying Celtic civilizations, alongside research focused on the natural sciences and the humanities.

After the death of his mother in March 1920, he moved to the north of Brittany, to the village of Saint-Hélory in Pordic, a few kilometers from Saint-Brieuc.

Although he only learned Breton late in his life, he was one of the main instigators of the movement for the massive creation of Breton neologisms from Celtic roots, notably on the model of Esperanto. In permanent collaboration with the grammarian and lexicographer François Vallée, he was the author of a considerable work on the ancient Celts, Notennou diwar-benn ar Gelted koz, published in 12 parts between 1911 and 1922, and of a History of the World (Istor ar Bed) and other essays published by the journal Gwalarn.

With François Vallée (Abherve) and Émile Ernault (Barz Ar Gouët), Meven Mordiern formed the group of "X3", passionate about Celtic antiquity, with whom he produced his great "saga" on Celtic antiquity, Sketla Segobrani, the apocryphal memoirs of the Celtic mercenary Segobranos, of which the first Book "Dis Atir – Teutatis" was published by Prud'homme in 1923, Books II-III in 1924 in one volume, and Book IV "Taranis – Esus" in 1925. The Sketla Segobrani were illustrated by James Bouillé, a member of the Seiz Breur.

After the war Le Roux lost his income and was reduced to extreme poverty, living on the charity of neighbours. He blamed the French government for his penury and left his papers to the United States: they are now in the Library of Congress.

== Selected works ==
- Notennou diwar-benn ar Gelted-koz o istor hag o sevenadur ("Notes on the Ancient Celts, their history and culture"), 12 books between 1911 and 1922.
- Sketla Segobrani, by the X3 (with François Vallée and Emile Ernault); Saint-Brieuc, Prud'homme, 1923–1925, 3 volumes (illustrated by James Bouillé.
- Istor ar Bed; Brest, Gwalarn, 1939.
- Prederiadennou diwar-benn ar yezou hag ar brezoneg; Brest, Gwalarn, 1935–1938.
- E fealded va c'houn hag e padelezh va c'harantez; Lesneven, Hor yezh, 2001.

== Bibliography ==
- Carney, Sébastien (2015). Breiz Atao !, Mordrel, Delaporte, Lainé, Fouéré : une mystique nationale (1901–1948). histoire (in French). Rennes: PUR. p. 608. ISBN 978-2-7535-4289-1. ISSN 1255-2364.
