= Francis Renaud =

Francis Renaud may refer to:

- Francis Renaud (actor), French cinema actor
- Francis Renaud (sculptor), French sculptor from Brittany
