= Louis Bourgain =

- Born: Louis Jean Marie Bourgain; 16 September 1881; Lanhélin
- Died: 4 April 1970; Lanhélin

Louis Jean Marie Bourgain, born on 10 September 1881 in Lanhélin (Ille-et-Vilaine) and died on 5 April 1970 in the same town, was a French Vice-Admiral and Prefect of Vienne. A collaborator during the Occupation, he was suspended from his duties and sentenced to imprisonment and national indignity for life at the Liberation before ultimately being pardoned.

== Pre War ==
Louis Bourgain was born on 10 September 1881 in Lanhélin (Ille-et-Vilaine). His parents were François Bourgain, a grocer, and Adelle Alaire. After studying law, he became a naval supply officer and later a commissioner. In 1911, he served as a first-class commissioner aboard the battleship Voltaire. Stationed in Brest, he was promoted to principal commissioner in 1918. By 1921, he was an administrator aboard the cruiser Waldeck-Rousseau, which took part in evacuating survivors of the Democratic Republic of Georgia’s forces during the Soviet invasion in February–March 1921.

== World War II: Collaboration ==
Since 1 January 1937, Bourgain had been a general commissioner and director of naval logistics in Brest. On 24 September 1940, following the imprisonment of Marcel Traub, he was assigned administrative responsibilities as Maritime Prefect of Brest by the Minister of the Marine François Darlan.

After the Germans invaded the Brest Arsenal, Bourgain became a regional prefect and was later appointed prefect of the region and Prefect of Vienne under the Darlan regime.

A proponent of the National Revolution and collaborator, Bourgain pursued resisters to the STO, resistance fighters, and Jewish people. He was held responsible for the arrest and imprisonment of members of the Louis Renard resistance network in 1943. He also ordered the large roundup of 31 January 1944, in which 481 Jews were arrested and transferred to the Drancy camp.

== Conviction ==
Bourgain was suspended from his duties on 17 November 1944 and sentenced to eight years in prison at the Liberation. He was also sentenced to national indignity for life and had his property confiscated. His appeal was denied. He was interned at the prison in Fontevraud (Maine-et-Loire). In 1946, the value of his confiscated property was reduced to 100,000 francs. He was released in 1947 and pardoned in 1952.

He returned in 1947 to his village of Lanhelin (Brittany) and died there in 1970.

== Family ==
He married Berthe Louise Marie Albert in Tours (Indre-et-Loire) on 20 January 1908. They had two daughters: Odile (born 3 January 1919) and Mireille (born 3 September 1924).
