= Mesnil-Roc'h =

- Commune
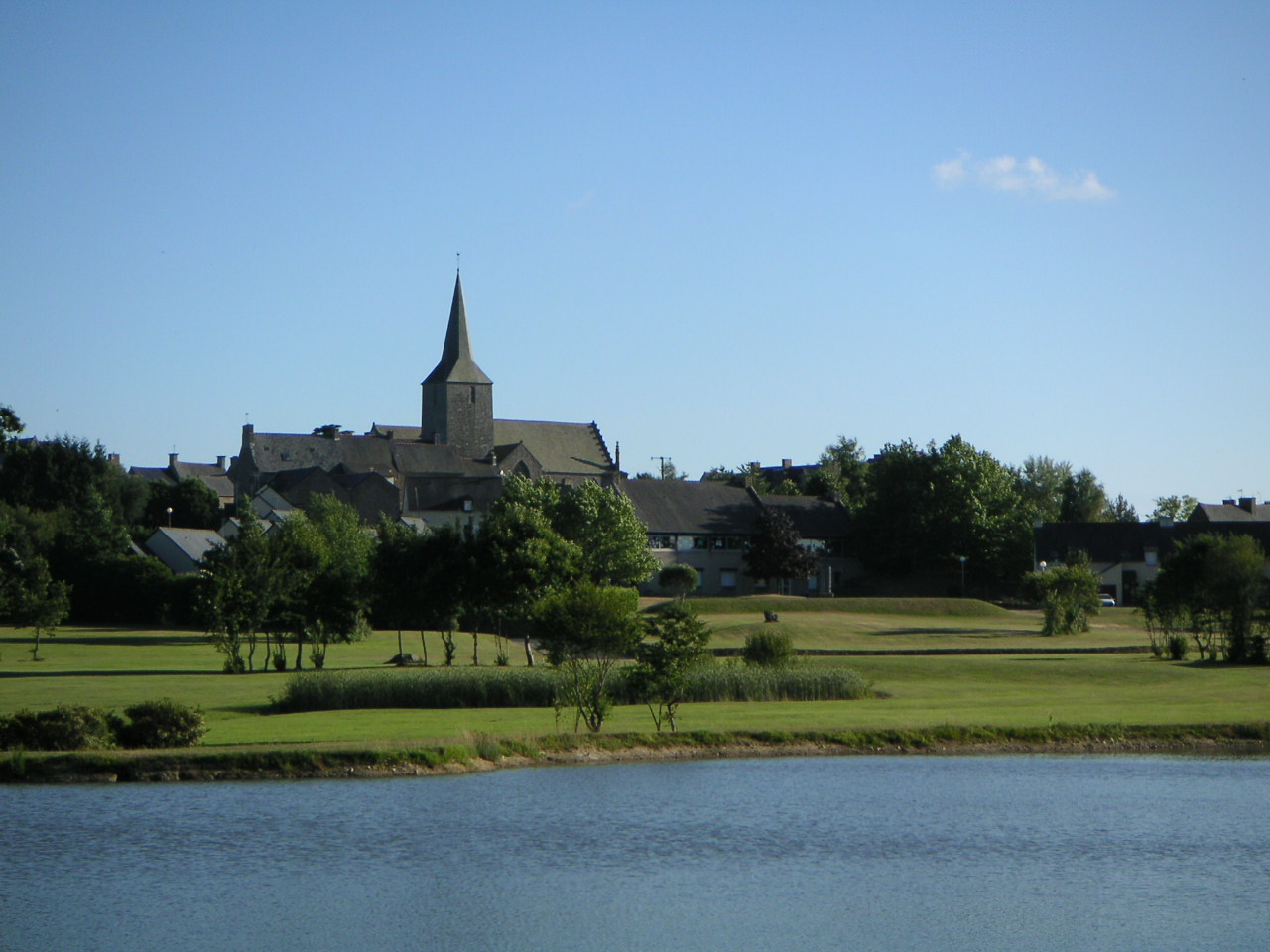
- A general view of Saint-Pierre-de-Plesguen
- Location of Mesnil-Roc'h
- Location within France Location within Brittany
- Coordinates: 48°26′52″N 1°54′43″W
- Country: France
- Region: Brittany
- Department: Ille-et-Vilaine
- Arrondissement: Saint-Malo
- Canton: Combourg
- Intercommunality: Bretagne Romantique
- Area^{1}: 41.16 km^{2} (15.89 sq mi)
- Highest elevation: 99 m (325 ft)
- Lowest elevation: 34 m (112 ft)
- Population (2023): 4,492
  - Density: 109.1/km^{2} (282.7/sq mi)
- Time zone: UTC+01:00 (CET)
  - Summer (DST): UTC+02:00 (CEST)
- INSEE/Postal code: 35308 /35720
- ^{1} French Land Register data, which excludes lakes, ponds, glaciers > 1 km^{2} (0.386 sq mi or 247 acres) and river estuaries.

Mesnil-Roc'h (Breton: Sant-Pêr-Plewenn) is a commune in the Ille-et-Vilaine department in Brittany in northwestern France. It was established on 1 January 2019 by merger of the former communes of Saint-Pierre-de-Plesguen (the seat), Lanhélin and Tressé.

== Geography ==
The commune is located 41.1 kilometres from the prefecture of the department, Rennes, and 12.5 kilometres from the canton of Combourg.

== Population ==
Population data refer to the commune in its geography as of January 2025.

Historical population
Year	Pop.	±% p.a.
1968	3,009	—
1975	2,903	−0.51%
1982	2,960	+0.28%
1990	2,960	+0.00%
1999	2,848	−0.43%
2007	3,630	+3.08%
2012	4,047	+2.20%
2017	4,301	+1.22%
2023	4,492	+0.73%
Source: INSEE

== See also ==
- Communes of the Ille-et-Vilaine department
