= Feiz ha Breiz =

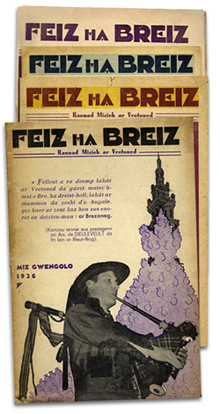
Feiz ha Breiz.

Feiz ha Breiz (Faith and Brittany) is the principal weekly journal in the Breton language. It originally appeared from 1865 to 1884, then was revived from 1899 to 1944, and then again from 1945 onwards.

== Original journal ==
Léopold de Léseleuc, bishop of Autun, was the founder of the first Feiz ha Breiz. In 1865 he persuaded the then Bishop of Quimper and Leon, Monseigneur Sergeant, of the value of a newspaper written in the Breton language for the inhabitants of the diocese. He also encouraged Sergeant to entrust the journal to Goulven Morvan, priest of Tréhou, who spoke excellent Breton and had wide experience in a number of local parishes. Morvan edited Feiz ha Breiz from 1865 to 1875.

The first issue of Feiz ha Breiz appeared on February 4, 1865. The review ceased publication on April 26, 1884, its last editor (1883 to 1884) being Gabriel Milin, a lay Breton language author, who had taken over from abbé Nédélec. Gabriel Milin had started to write in Breton after having become acquainted with Colonel Troude, the compiler of a Breton language dictionary.

== Revived journal ==
Thanks to the activity of the Feiz ha Breiz Association, which was set up in the Diocese of Quimper and Leon to protect the Breton language, the review was revived in 1899. Number 1 of the new Feiz ha Breiz was dated January 1900. Within a short time it was absorbed into the Breton Catholic organisation Bleun-Brug, set up by abbé Jean-Marie Perrot. Participating in the editorial process from 1902, Perrot became the editor, initially only semi-officially, in 1907, then officially from 1911 until his death in December 1943.

Feiz ha Breiz encompassed two other titles, publishing as Feiz ha Breiz, Arvorig ha Kroaz-ar-Vretoned from February 1921 until December 1926. A French language edition existed for Upper Brittany. Its title was Foi et Bretagne, organe du Bleun-Brug de Haute-Bretagne.

During the war the journal became associated with the collaborationism of the Breton National movement. After Perrot was assassinated by the Resistance, the journal continued for a short while, but its last number appeared in March 1944, edited by abbé L. Bleunven, Rector of Ploudalmezeau.

== Post-war journal ==
Feiz ha Breiz was recreated after the war in 1945 appearing under the new title of Kroaz Breiz which changed soon into Bleun-Brug. In 1956 Bleun-Brug split into two factions: one more progressive and regionalist-minded and one more conservative and nationalist-minded. As a result two separate journals emerged:

- Nationalist: Barr-Heol war Feiz ha Breizh (in Breton, run by Father Marsel Klerg)
- Regionalist: Bleun-Brug (this persists as a bilingual scholarly journal, directed by canon François Mevellec).
