= Joseph Savina =

Joseph Savina (1901–1983) was a Breton woodworker, cabinet maker and sculptor who was a member of the art movement Seiz Breur. He collaborated with Le Corbusier on several projects, and sought to revitalise Breton furniture design. He ran a workshop in Tréguier .

== Early life ==
Savina was born in Douarnenez. Both his father and brother were cabinetmakers, and Savina was apprenticed in the trade at Tréguier, learning carpentry and carving. He soon progressed to become foreman of the workshop. In 1927, having graduated as a fully trained cabinetmaker, he won the national Meilleur Ouvrier de France (Best Craftsman of France) competition. He organized his own design studio in 1929, situated in the rue Saint-André in Tréguier. His early works were mainly statuettes depicting fishermen and restoration work on the carvings in the city's cathedral. He later sought to modernize Celtic traditions, introducing Celtic knot patterns into his work.

He joined the Breton nationalist art movement Seiz Breur, which was influenced by the Arts and Crafts movement, becoming its principal woodworker. He insisted that "plastic work is the basis of architectural work" and was an ardent defender of Breton folk art.

== Collaboration with Le Corbusier ==
He first met Le Corbusier in 1935, leading to a long friendship based on respect and mutual admiration. The two regularly exchanged ideas, and Corbusier expressed admiration for the "sense of plasticity" in Savina's work. Savina executed carvings from Corbusier's drawings.

Under Corbusier's influence Savina made a number of abstract sculptures. Corbusier wrote to Savina of these works: "Your works are just the right size; art for the apartment; art for the loving collector". He added that "this type of sculpture comes into what I call the plastic-acoustic: that is to say forms that both speak and listen.

Savina ran his workshop until 1970, when he retired and passed it to his protégé Michel Le Calvez. The Lycée Joseph Savina in Tréguier is named for him.

== Bibliography ==
Le Corbusier et la Bretagne catalogue of the exhibition at Chateau de Kerjean (Finistère), Editions nouvelles du Finistère - Quimper Brest, 1996
