= Gabriel Milin =

French poet and philologist (1822–1895)

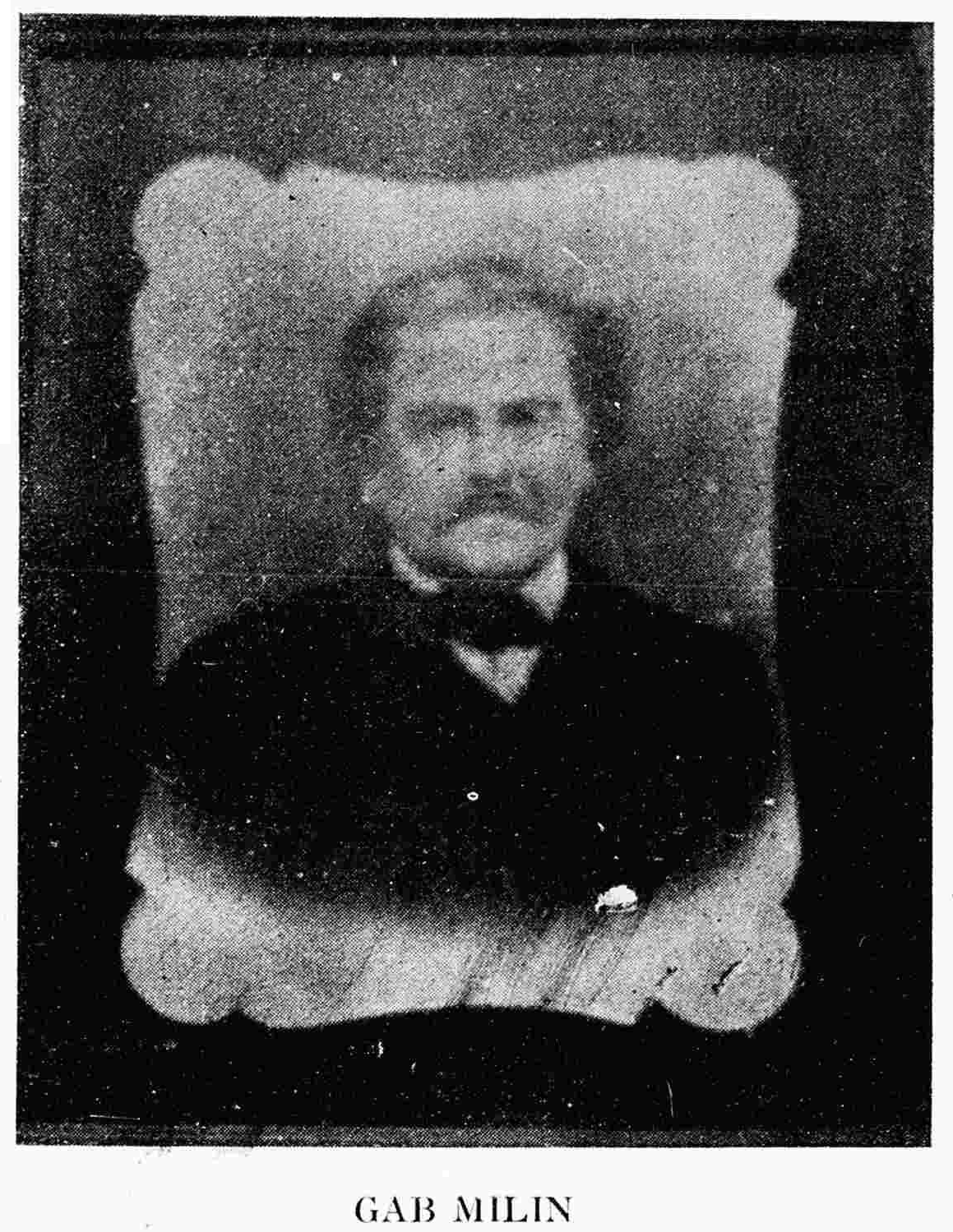
Gabriel Milin

Gabriel-Jean-Maie Milin or Gab Milin (3 September 1822, Saint-Pol-de-Léon, Finistère – 27 December 1895, Île de Batz, Finistère) was a poet, folklorist and philologist writing in the Breton language, sometimes under his bardic name, Laouenan Breiz. He was also a naval clerk and mayor of the Île de Batz.

== Life ==
Milin was born in 1822 at the manor of Kermorus in Saint-Pol-de-Léon, western Brittany, to a farming family. He was educated first in Saint-Pol and then at a seminary in Quimper, which he left after one and a half years, doubting that he had a religious vocation. From 1845 until his retirement in 1880 he worked as a naval accountant at the Brest Arsenal, supporting the thirteen children he had by his three wives.

His work brought him into contact with Breton-speakers from all regions, from whom he collected proverbs, tales and songs in various dialects. He did not have enough money to publish the results of his researches on his own account, but was enabled to do so by financial help from the poet Jean-Pierre Le Scour. In the course of his work he met Colonel Amable-Emmanuel Troude, a Breton-language lexicographer, with whom he collaborated: in 1855 appeared Mignoun ar Vugale, a little booklet for children, in 1857 the Nouvelles conversations en breton et en français, divizoù brezonek ha gallek and in 1862 the Colloque français et breton, ou Nouveau vocabulaire entièrement refondu. He held to the system of Le Gonidec which standardizes Breton grammar and spelling and minimizes the use of French loan-words, despite the sometimes unfavorable reception of that system. He also translated or adapted many works into Breton, notably Greek and Latin classics and the Fables of La Fontaine, and composed original poems.

In 1880 he retired to the Île de Batz and became its mayor, holding that office until his death in 1895. At the same time, from 1883 to 1884 he was editor of the journal Feiz ha Breiz.

Alongside the publication of about fifteen works in Breton (from 1866 to 1885), he collected expressions and terms of local use on the Île de Batz, and in Léon and Trégor he collected folksongs. Ninety-nine of these, including also proverbs, folktales etc., were published by Abeozen and Maodez Glanndour in the journal Gwerin (nos. 1, 2 and 3; 1961–1962).

== Sources ==
- Anonymous (March–April 2007). "Berceau de Gabriel Milin (1822–1895)" (PDF). Saint-Pol de Léon...notre ville (in French) (29).
- Berthou-Bécam, Laurence (January 1996). "Après Luzel et La Villemarqué... Gabriel Milin". Musique Bretonne (in French) (139): 14–19.
- Dottin, G. (1925). "Review of G. Milin Gwechall-goz e oa". Annales de Bretagne (in French). 37 (3/4): 423–424.
- Le Guennec, Louis (1979). Morlaix et sa région (in French). Quimper: Amis de Louis Le Guennec.
- Malrieu, Patrick (1983). Histoire de la chanson populaire bretonne (in French). Guingamp: Dastum et Skol. ISBN 9782735507306.
