= Georges Arnoux =

Breton composer

- Born: August 3, 1891; Paris, France
- Died: November 11, 1971 (aged 80); Vevey, Switzerland
- Education: Schola Cantorum de Paris
- Occupation: composer

Georges Arnoux (3 August 1891 – 11 November 1971) was a French composer with Breton nationalist leanings.

== Life and music ==
Born in Paris, Arnoux was the descendant of a family originally from Switzerland. He studied harmony, counterpoint and composition with Vincent d'Indy at the Schola Cantorum de Paris.

He was very interested in Brittany and its traditional music (he owned a house in Brignogan) and learned the Breton language. In the 1920s, he was involved with the Breton cultural movements (cercle celtique in Paris, K.A.V., Bleun Brug) and joined the Breton artistic movement Seiz Breur in 1939. From 1934 he argued for a conservatory of Breton music that never came to fruition.

He died in Vevey, Switzerland.

== Selected works ==
=== Compositions ===
Large-scale works

- Koroll ar vuhez hag ar maro, ballet work for orchestra (1939)
- Gethsemanie, "sacred poem" for soloists and orchestra (Radio-Lausanne, 1948)
- Suite pittoresque et brève, for string orchestra (1949)

Piano music

- Valse des Korrigans (1907)
- Voici la saison joyeuse du délicieux printemps (1920)
- Pages bretonnes (1938)
- Tarik lan la (1951)

Songs

- Noel des prisonniers (1923)
- 20 Chansons bretonnes (1933)
- Kanaouennou goueliou ar Bleun-Brug (several volumes, 1935–1939)
- Petites histoires bretonnes en huit chansons (1942)
- Chansons pour Martine (1948)
- Adieu Bretagne (1964)

=== Writings ===
- Conditions du répertoire musical breton (1934)
- "L'Harmonisation des chants populaires", in: La Bretagne à Paris, 11 April 1936
- Mathématique de la mise en scène (Paris, 1956)
- Science et musique (Nimes, 1956)
- Musique platonicienne (Paris, 1960)
- La Vache enchantée (Paris, 1961)
- Demain sera détruit (Lausanne, 1967)
