= Tressé =

Tressé Trese
- Part of Mesnil-Roc'h
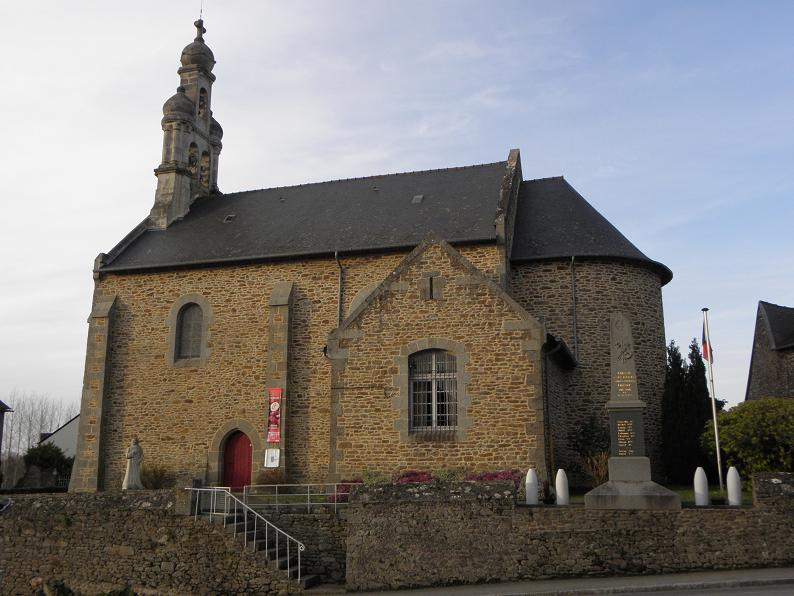
- The church in Tressé
- Location of Tressé
- Location within France Location within Brittany
- Coordinates: 48°28′55″N 1°53′01″W
- Country: France
- Region: Brittany
- Department: Ille-et-Vilaine
- Arrondissement: Saint-Malo
- Canton: Combourg
- Commune: Mesnil-Roc'h
- Area^{1}: 5.24 km^{2} (2.02 sq mi)
- Highest elevation: 77 m (253 ft)
- Lowest elevation: 35 m (115 ft)
- Population (2023): 434
  - Density: 82.8/km^{2} (215/sq mi)
- Time zone: UTC+01:00 (CET)
  - Summer (DST): UTC+02:00 (CEST)
- Postal code: 35720
- ^{1} French Land Register data, which excludes lakes, ponds, glaciers > 1 km^{2} (0.386 sq mi or 247 acres) and river estuaries.

Tressé (Breton: Trese, Gallo: Tresei) is a former commune in the Ille-et-Vilaine department of Brittany in northwestern metropolitan France. On 1 January 2019, it was merged into the new commune Mesnil-Roc'h. Inhabitants of Tressé are called tresséens in French.

== See also ==
- Communes of the Ille-et-Vilaine department
