= Georges Robin =

French sculptor and designer

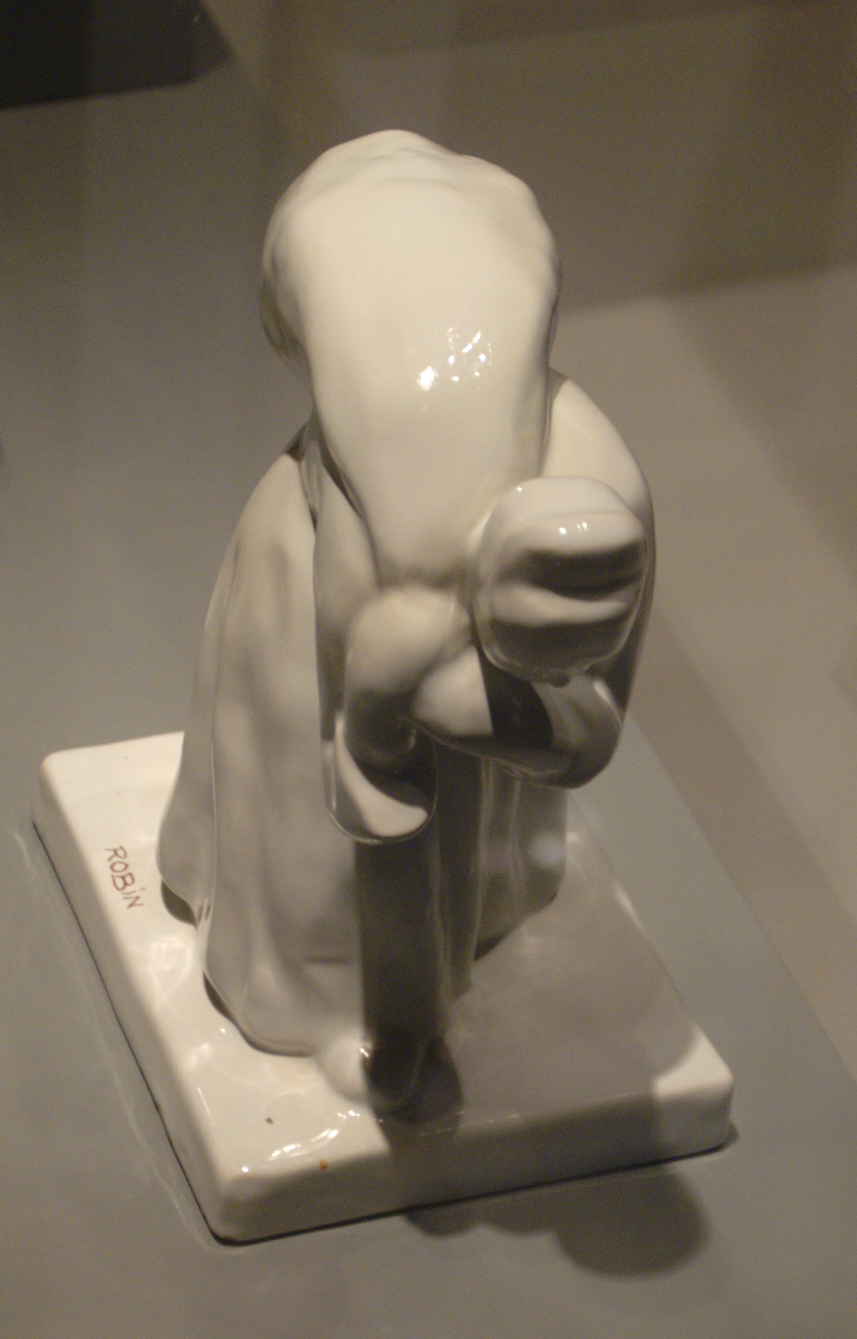
Femme au sac, by Jorj Robin

Georges Robin (1904–1928), also known as Jorj Robin, was a sculptor and designer from Nantes.

Robin was a member of the Breton nationalist art movement Seiz Breur, working at the magazine Kornog, founded by the movement's leader René-Yves Creston. He created sculptures and embroidery designs for the workshop Nadoziou (needles) based in Nantes.

With other members of Seiz Breur he took part in the founding of the Nantes Celtic Circle, lending his design studio for its classes in the Breton language. He also created a project for a Breton language choir.

After his early death at the age of 24, he was commemorated in a special edition of the journal Keltia, written by Creston and Paul Ladmirault.
