= Octave-Louis Aubert =

French editor and writer (1870–1950)

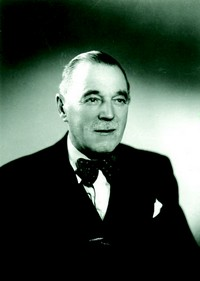
Octave-Louis Aubert

Octave-Louis Aubert, (8 January 1870 Paris – 14 January 1950 Saint-Brieuc) was a French editor and writer associated with Breton nationalism.

Born in Paris, Aubert came to Brittany in 1893 when he got a job as assistant editor of the journal Réveil Breton in Saint-Brieuc. He soon became devoted to Breton culture. He founded Le Démocrate in 1898, and was editor in chief of Progrès in 1899. He published Le Livre de la Bretagne in 1901 and wrote numerous works for the theatre in Saint-Brieuc. He also organised many conferences.

Interested in promoting tourism, he founded the first tourist office in Saint-Brieuc. In 1922, he created the monthly journal La Bretagne touristique, which covered far more than just tourist issues, promoting historical and contemporary Breton culture. His book Légendes traditionnelles de la Bretagne retold many local legends, concentrating on those about the history of Breton Christianity. In 1921, he published Contes d'un Breton Adoptif (Tales of an Adopted Breton).

Aubert was the president of the Chamber of commerce in Côtes-du-Nord from 1930 to 1945. He was close friends with Breton writers Charles Le Goffic and Anatole Le Braz and was a member of the cultural movement Seiz Breur. From 1934, he was president of the committee for the construction and decoration of the Breton pavilion for the 1937 Exposition Internationale des Arts et Techniques dans la Vie Moderne.

He died in Saint-Brieuc. Several streets in Brittany are named after him.

== Notable works ==
- Le Livre de Bretagne, 1901.
- Légendes traditionnelles de la Bretagne.
- theatre works...
