= Lanhélin =

Lanhélin Lanhelen
- Part of Mesnil-Roc'h
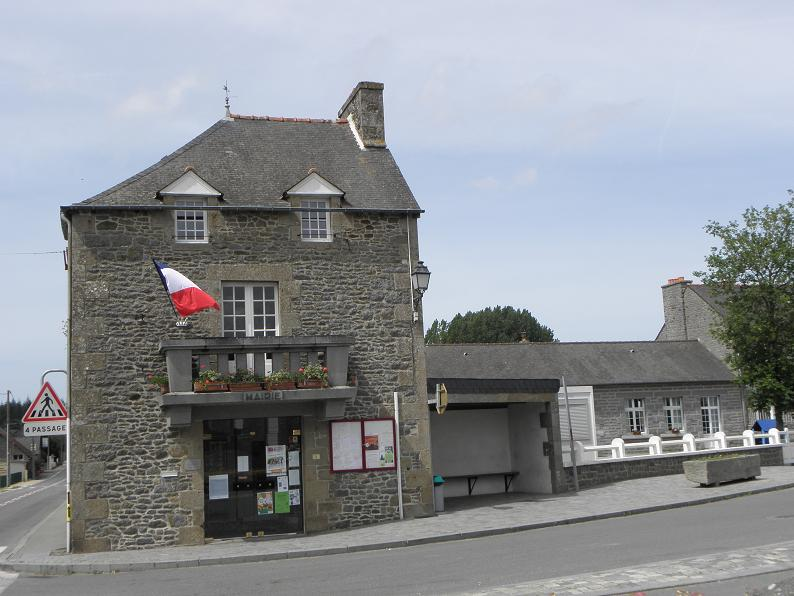
- The town hall of Lanhélin
- Location of Lanhélin
- Location within France Location within Brittany
- Coordinates: 48°27′34″N 1°49′37″W
- Country: France
- Region: Brittany
- Department: Ille-et-Vilaine
- Arrondissement: Saint-Malo
- Canton: Combourg
- Commune: Mesnil-Roc'h
- Area^{1}: 6.43 km^{2} (2.48 sq mi)
- Highest elevation: 88 m (289 ft)
- Lowest elevation: 44 m (144 ft)
- Population (2023): 962
  - Density: 150/km^{2} (387/sq mi)
- Time zone: UTC+01:00 (CET)
  - Summer (DST): UTC+02:00 (CEST)
- Postal code: 35720
- ^{1} French Land Register data, which excludes lakes, ponds, glaciers > 1 km^{2} (0.386 sq mi or 247 acres) and river estuaries.

Lanhélin (French pronunciation: [lɑ̃.elɛ̃]; Breton: Lanhelen) is a former commune in the Ille-et-Vilaine department in Brittany in northwestern France. On 1 January 2019, it was merged into the new commune Mesnil-Roc'h. The inhabitants of Lanhélin are known as Lanhélinois in French.

== See also ==
- Communes of the Ille-et-Vilaine department
