= Jacques Pellen =

French jazz guitarist (1957–2020)

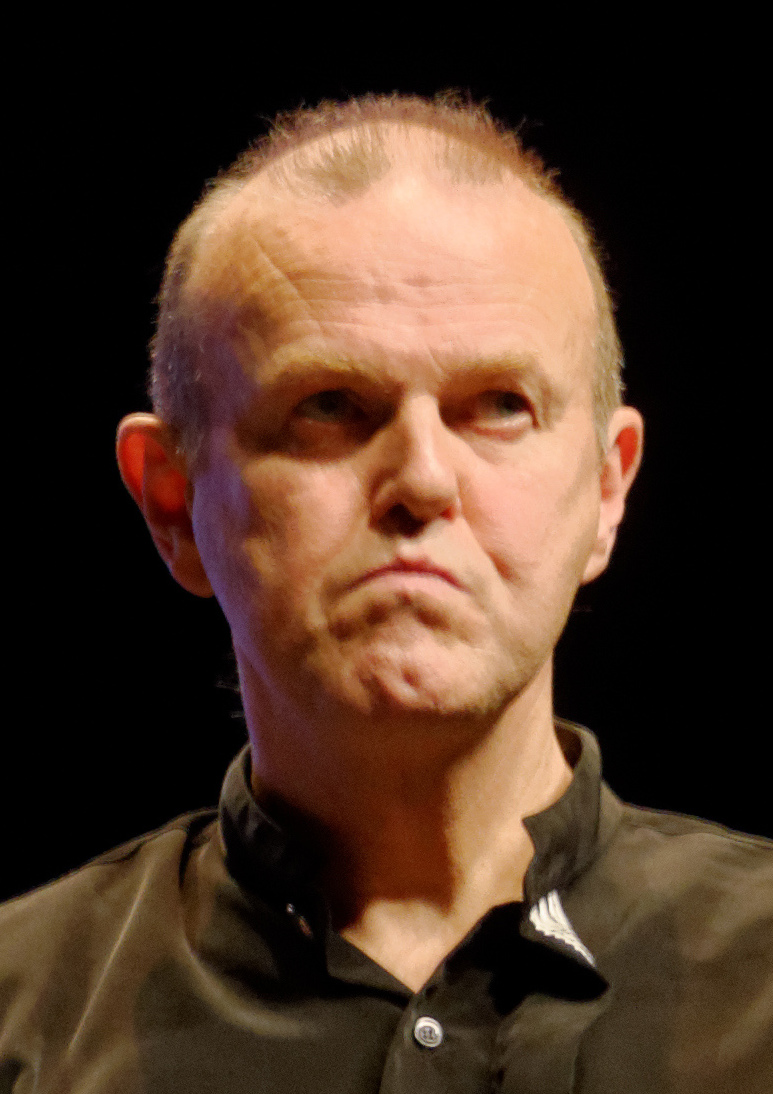
- Jacques Pellen in 2015

Background information
- Born: 9 April 1957; Brest, France
- Died: 21 April 2020 (aged 63); Brest, France
- Genres: Jazz

Jacques Pellen (9 April 1957 – 21 April 2020) was a French jazz guitarist. Pellen worked with many musicians over the years such as Peter Gritz, Kenny Wheeler, Bruno Nevez, Henri Texier, Riccardo Del Fra, and violinist Didier Lockwood.

He died from COVID-19 during the COVID-19 pandemic in France on 21 April 2020, at Brest hospital.
