= Jean Fréour =

French sculptor (1919–2010)

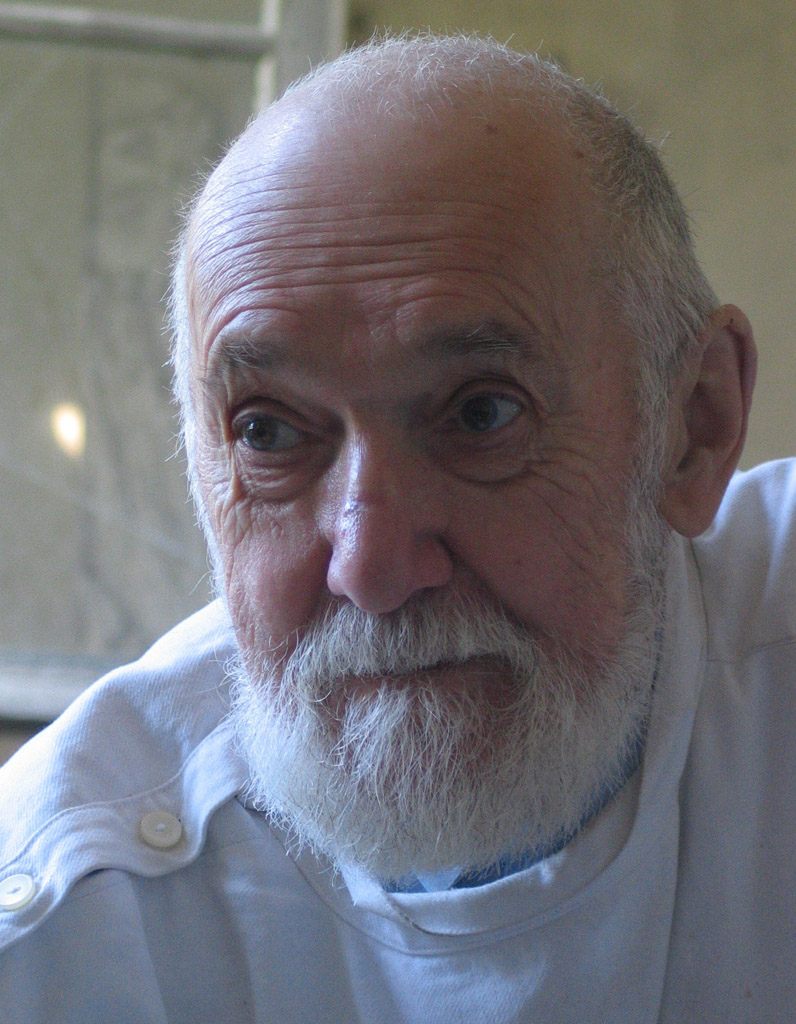
Fréour in his studio in Batz-sur-Mer in 2005

Jean Fréour (8 August 1919 – 11 June 2010) was a prominent Breton sculptor.

== Biography ==
Fréour was born in Nantes. He studied at the Bordeaux School of the Fine Arts and attended the classes of Louis-Henry Bouchard in the national School of the Fine Arts in Paris. He is a member of the Breton artistic movement Seiz Breur.

In the mid-1950s, he settled in the Breton south coast town of Batz-sur-Mer. For a period of a year, he was mayor of the town.

In his work, Fréour uses different materials, including schist, marble, onyx, and wood. His sculptures often carry a stamp of Breton identity impregnated with Catholicism.

He is the maker of the statue of Anne of Brittany (made of bronze and erected in the city of Nantes in 2002).

The works of Jean Fréour gives details of his work.
