= Saint-Pierre-de-Plesguen =

Saint-Pierre-de-Plesguen Sant-Pêr-Plewenn
- Part of Mesnil-Roc'h
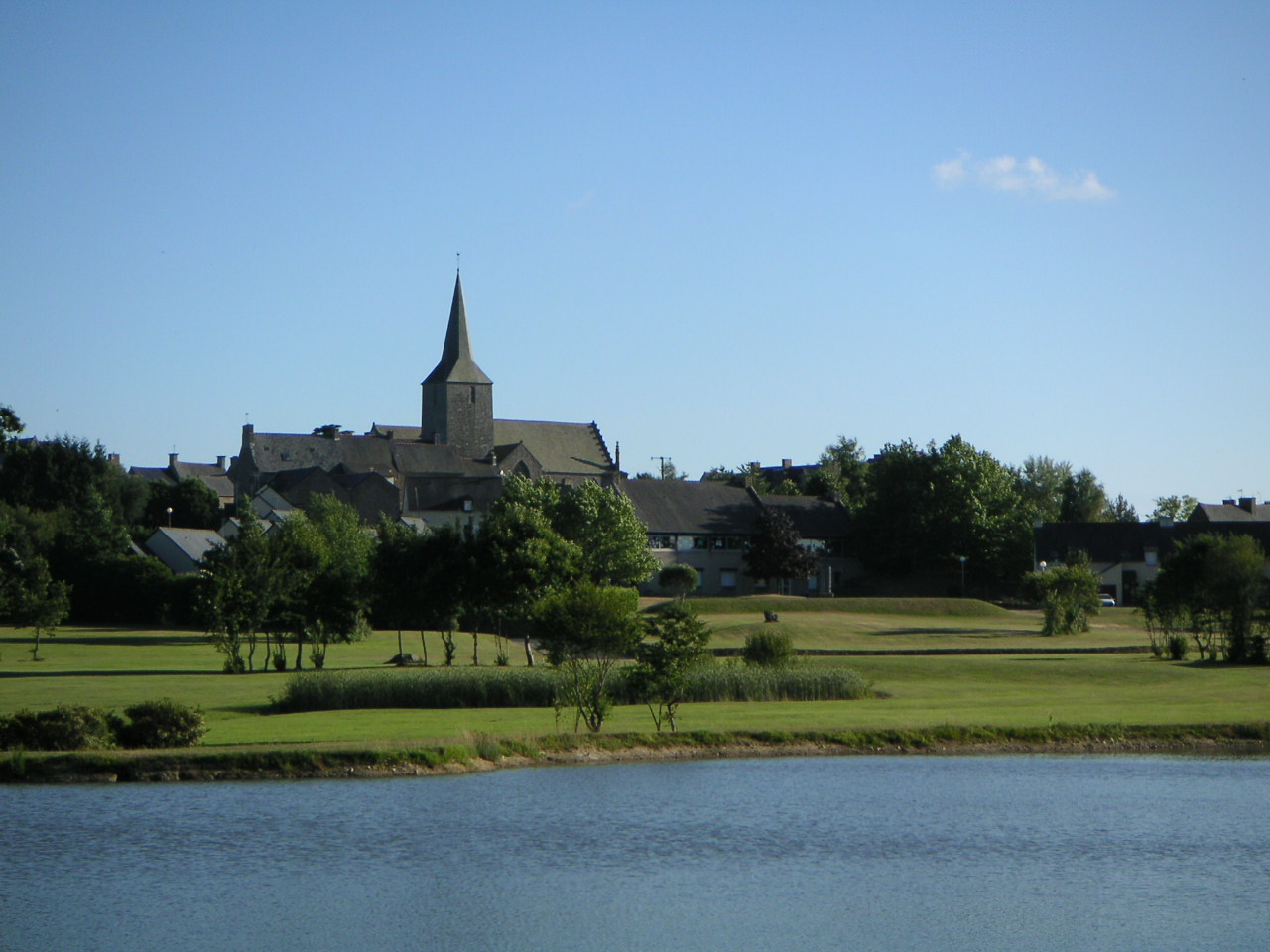
- A general view of Saint-Pierre-de-Plesguen

- Coat of arms
- Location of Saint-Pierre-de-Plesguen
- Location within France Location within Brittany
- Coordinates: 48°26′52″N 1°54′43″W
- Country: France
- Region: Brittany
- Department: Ille-et-Vilaine
- Arrondissement: Saint-Malo
- Canton: Combourg
- Commune: Mesnil-Roc'h
- Area^{1}: 29.49 km^{2} (11.39 sq mi)
- Elevation: 82 m (269 ft)
- Highest elevation: 99 m (325 ft)
- Lowest elevation: 34 m (112 ft)
- Population (2022): 3,072
  - Density: 104.2/km^{2} (269.8/sq mi)
- Time zone: UTC+01:00 (CET)
  - Summer (DST): UTC+02:00 (CEST)
- Postal code: 35720
- ^{1} French Land Register data, which excludes lakes, ponds, glaciers > 1 km^{2} (0.386 sq mi or 247 acres) and river estuaries.

Saint-Pierre-de-Plesguen (Breton: Sant-Pêr-Plewenn) is a former commune in the Ille-et-Vilaine department in Brittany in northwestern France. On 1 January 2019, it was merged into the new commune Mesnil-Roc'h.

== Personalities ==
Hughes Felicité Robert de Lamennais lived in Saint-Pierre-de-Plesguen during the 19th century.

== Population ==
Inhabitants of Saint-Pierre-de-Plesguen are called saint-pierrais in French.

Historical population

Year	Pop.	±% p.a.
1793	1,780	—
1821	2,013	+0.44%
1846	2,226	+0.40%
1872	2,389	+0.27%
1901	2,643	+0.35%
1926	2,383	−0.41%
1946	2,287	−0.21%

Year	Pop.	±% p.a.
1962	2,270	−0.05%
1968	2,164	−0.79%
1975	2,038	−0.85%
1982	2,023	−0.11%
1990	2,075	+0.32%
1999	1,977	−0.54%
2022	3,072	+1.93%

Source: EHESS and INSEE

== See also ==
- Communes of the Ille-et-Vilaine department
