= Xavier de Langlais =

French painter

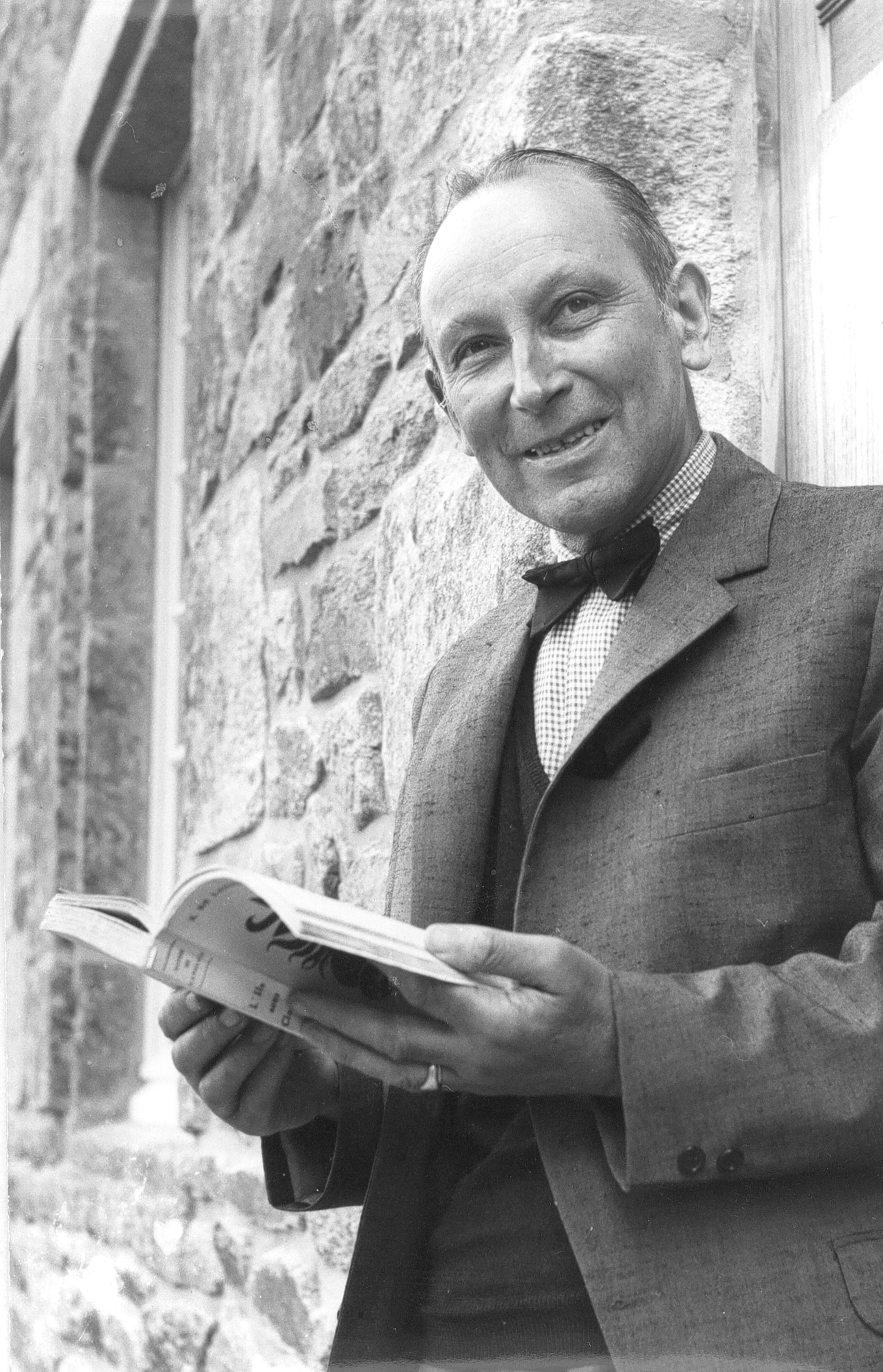
Xavier de Langlais

Xavier de Langlais (April 26, 1906 in Sarzeau – June 15, 1975) was a Breton painter, printmaker and writer. He usually signed his work with the name Langleiz, a Breton language version of his surname.

== Early career ==
Langlais studied art in Nantes (1922) and Paris (1926–1928). During his stay in Paris he took advantage of his free time to learn the Breton language. He tried to find a way to create a new art connected with his love of Brittany, and began to work as a painter, church decorator and researcher into artistic techniques.

In 1931 he married Annick Gazet du Chatelier, with whom he had four children. In 1948, he became a professor of design at the Ecole des Beaux-Arts de Rennes, where he continued to work for the remainder of his career. He also worked as an illustrator, mainly using the traditional woodblock printing technique.

He wrote a book on techniques of oil painting, which is still authoritative and has been translated into several languages.

== Breton artist and activist ==
A supporter of the Breton National Party, he edited and illustrated its literature. In 1924, he made contact with Ar Seiz Breur, a group of nationalistic Breton artists formed by Jeanne Malivel and René-Yves Creston.

With James Bouillé, an architect and member of Ar Seiz Breur, he established the art workshop "An Droellenn" (The Spiral) in 1935. This was dedicated to the revival of Breton Christian art. He created several religious murals: in the chapel of St. Joseph's College in Lannion, the Grand Seminary in Saint-Brieuc, the Notre-Dame-de-la-Mer Étel Church in La Richardais, and the Stations of the Cross, La Baule.

He was a prolific writer in the Breton language and was an ardent promoter of orthographic reform would create characters for the specific dialect of Vannes Breton that he practiced. He held discussions in Vannes in 1936, but the project only reached fruition 1941. In that year he moved to Rennes, where he worked as an artistic and literary critic, writing a regular column in La Bretagne, a pro-Marshal Philippe Pétain collaborationist newspaper edited by Yann Fouéré.

He had met Roparz Hemon in Paris in 1926 and was invited by him to join the editorial board of the Breton literary magazine Gwalarn. He published plays, poems and novels and focused especially on the Arthurian cycle. He also participated in the revival of the publishing and distribution of books in Breton in 1949, and participated in the summer school Bretonnante Kamp Etrekeltiek ar Vrezhonegerien, founded in 1948, and which still exists.

He helped in the dissemination of books in Breton, and later became chairman of the Celtic Circle in Rennes. He continued to espouse Breton nationalism throughout his life.

== Writings ==
- An diou zremm (the two faces), drama, 1932
- Kanou en noz, poems, 1932
- Koroll ar vuhez hag ar maro (Dance of Life and Death), poem, 1938
- Ene al Linennou
- Enez ar Rod (Island of the Wheel), a science fiction novel, written 1940–1942 (published 1949 by Ar Balb and 2000 by Hor Yezh)
- Mouladuriou hor yezh (Island Under Glass, 1962 Pan, 2002, Coop Breizh)
- Tristan et Yseult Brest, Al Liamm, 1958
- Technique de la peinture à l'huile, Flammarion, 1959 détail de l'édition
- Le Roman du Roi Arthur, novels, 5 vol., Coop Breizh, Spézet, 1965–1971
  - Merlin, ISBN 2-903708-14-2 (also published in Breton)
  - Lancelot, ISBN 2-909924-21-1
  - Perceval, ISBN 2-909924-10-6
  - La Quête du Graal, ISBN 2-903708-13-4
  - La Fin des temps aventureux, ISBN 2-909924-22-X
- Romant ar Roue Arzhur. Marzhin (Merlin), breton version of the first book from the Arthur series, Brest, Al Liamm, 1975.
- Tristan hag Yseult, Rennes, Terre de brume, 1994 ISBN 2908021374 (cf. 1958).

== Bibliography ==
- Xavier de Langlais et L'île de Sein, Patricia Plaud-Dihuit .
- Les décorations dans les édifices religieux en Bretagne, Masters dissertation in art history, by Florence Collet, supervised by Denise Delouche
- Etude comparative de l'ile sous cloche de Xavier de Langlais et de L'Île du docteur Moreau de Wells, master's thesis in modern literature, Fabienne Tireau.
- Encyclopedia Bretonne No. 2. 1977
- Xavier de Langlais et la Bretagne, complete works edited by Denise Delouche. Edition Coop Breizh . Coop Breizh Edition.
