= Jeanne Coroller-Danio =

Breton nationalist and writer

Jeanne Coroller-Danio (25 May 1892 – 13 July 1944) was a Breton nationalist and writer. She is also known as Jeanne Coroller (her maiden name) and Jeanne Chassin du Guerny (her married name). Her best-known pen-name was Danio, but she published her work under various pseudonyms: J.C. Danio, Jeanne de Coatgourc'han, Gilles Gautrel and Gilesse Penguilly.

She was the daughter of Breton-language writer Eugene Coroller (1857–1923), friend of Theodore Hersart of Villemarqué. Born in Mordelles in 1892, she married Rene Chassin du Guerny in 1924, with whom she had six children.

== Literary career ==
A traditionalist Catholic and talented writer, she published the nationalistic History of our Brittany in 1922, which was illustrated by Jeanne Malivel, inspiring the foundation of Seiz Breur, the nationalist movement in Breton art and literature. In 1929, she published the Mystery of Brittany, which was dramatised in the Abbe Perrot's Breton language translation at a Bleun-Brug festival in Douarnenez in front of nearly 10,000 people.

In 1940, she contributed to the children's journal Ôlolé which published The Wolves of Coatmenez (1941), followed shortly by Crusade of the Wolves (1943).

== Collaborationism and death ==
During World War II she was associated with the pro-Nazi faction of Célestin Lainé, whose Breton militia she supported. Her chateau also quartered the Bagadou Stourm (Breton nationalist stormtroopers). As a member of Lainé's faction she was kidnapped by a Maquis group in 1944 and was stabbed and beaten to death. Her death caused considerable debate, since she had not been directly involved with anti-Resistance activity. Plaid Cymru the Welsh nationalist party in Britain, protested that French anti-Bretonism lay behind the killing rather than anti-Nazism.
