= Francis Renaud (sculptor) =

French sculptor

Francis Renaud (1887–1973), was a Breton sculptor mainly noted for his monumental granite public memorials in Brittany.

Born in Saint-Brieuc, Côtes d'Armor, Brittany, Renaud was associated with the revival of Breton nationalist ideals in art in the early 20th century. His earlier works are in a style close to Art Nouveau, influenced by the work of his tutor Jean Boucher. He later moved towards more simplified and stylised forms influenced by Breton traditions, joining the nationalist art movement Seiz Breur.

Retaining a studio in Paris, he also lived for part of the year in his native Brittany, where he used local Kersanton granite for his most notable works, especially the Pleureuse de Tréguier (1922), the town of Tréguier's memorial to the dead of World War I. It depicts a local woman, Marie-Louise Le Put, who had lost her husband in the war and had also lost their three young children. She is shown seated, wrapped in a mourning gown. The memorial is notable for its stylised grandeur and solidity, symbolising the stoicism and resilience of local people. The art historian Malvina Hoffman writes that its "massive design commands reverence and respect".

In addition to the famous Pleureuse de Tréguier, he also created memorials in Ploufragan, Trévé and Saint-Brieuc, where Renaud also made another emblematic sculpture representing a Breton woman in traditional dress as an icon of local identity.

Renaud was also notable for memorial sculptures to Breton intellectuals such as the poet Anatole Le Braz, the composer Guy Ropartz and the novelist Pierre Loti. His memorial to Le Braz comprises a granite pillar in the College A. Braz, Saint-Brieuc, elaborately carved with symbolic figures representing Breton identity. After World War II Renaud created another sculpture for the college, a statue of a naked youth entitled l'Ephebe, representing pupils of the College who had been deported and killed by the Nazis.

== See also ==
- List of works by Francis Renaud, with appropriate notes.
