= Jean-Marie Perrot =

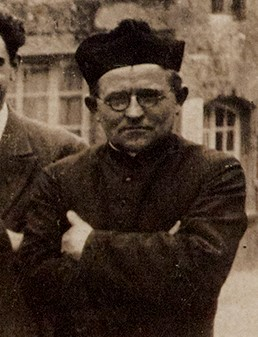
Abbé Perrot, seen from the front, arms crossed

The abbé Jean-Marie Perrot, in Breton Yann-Vari Perrot (French: [ʒɑ̃maʁi pɛʁo]; 3 September 1877 – 12 December 1943), was a Breton nationalist priest and later collaborator who was assassinated by the French Resistance during World War II. He was the founder of the Breton Catholic movement Bleun-Brug.

== Early life ==
Perrot was raised in a provincial Breton-speaking family. After studying at the Institut des Frères des Écoles in Guingamp in 1889, he expressed a desire to become a priest. He left to study humanities at the Pont-Croix Youth Seminary. He spent one year in Brest with the 19th infantry regiment, then enrolled in the Quimper Seminary. He became vicar of Saint-Vougay in 1904, where he undertook the patronage of Paotred Sant-Nouga forming study circles, a choir, and a theatre troupe.

== Breton language activism ==
Perrot founded Bleun-Brug (Heather Flower) in 1905, which soon absorbed the magazine Feiz ha Breiz (Faith and Brittany), which he edited after 1911. The stated aims of the organisation were:

- to promote the Breton ideal in all three intellectual, political and economic arenas.
- to contribute, as Catholics, to the return of Brittany to the full exercise of its traditional faith.

He was named vicar of Saint-Thégonnec in March 1914. On the outbreak of war he was called up at Lesneven on 5 August but he asked to leave to volunteer for the Groupe des Brancardiers Divisionnaires. He was decorated after World War I. After 1910, he played an important role in the Emsav, the Breton nationalist movement. In 1920, Perrot became vicar of Plouguerneau, where he patronised organised theatrical performances.

Though initially stationed in a conservative Saint-Vougay parish, he was transferred to the more leftist area of Scrignac in 1930. On 8 July 1941 he became part of the group of writers who adopted a unified orthography of the Breton language.

== World War II ==
With the outbreak of war, hostility towards Perrot in Scrignac grew, as he was suspected of pro-German sympathies.

On 16 October 1939 telegraphic lines in the region of Huelgoat were cut. Perrot was accused by authorities of sabotage. The gendarmes searched his estate twice and interrogated him, but he was released as he had an alibi. Afterwards, an enquiry established that a military prisoner was responsible for cutting the wires.

During the war, he continued to produce Feiz ha Breiz. In spite of a ban by the Bishop of Quimper on celebrating nationalist anniversaries during the occupation, he organised the members of Bleun-Brug in Tréguier on the 29 and 30 August to celebrate the 500th anniversary of the death of Duke Jean V of Brittany. In October 1942, he was named a member of the Comité Consultatif de Bretagne (CCB), a non-elected council put in place by[Regional Prefect Jean Quénette to put forward proposals relating to Breton language and culture.

In July 1941, Perrot took part in the German-sponsored effort to unify the writing of Breton.

Perrot sympathised strongly with the collaborationist Breton National Party. After his parsonage was partly requisitioned by the Germans, Perrot was accused of collaboration. According to Henri Fréville, on 7 August 1943 Perrot was questioned about the movements of members of Bagadou Stourm, Breton nationalist stormtroopers allied to the Nazis, who had stopped at Scrignac. He was hospitable toward the Bagadou Stourm Youth, who were most active around Finistère, where leaders such as Yann Goulet had been arrested by the French police but released by the Germans.

== Assassination ==
On 12 December 1943, aged 66, the abbé was killed by Jean Thépaut, a member of the French Communist Party, after a series of denunciations of Perrot for collaborationist activity.

== Legacy ==
Abbé Perrot was laid to rest at the chapel of Coat-Quéau, in Scrignac. His memory is often celebrated on Easter Monday. His role has been the source of much controversy about "the "Breton cause" and its relationship to collaborationism.

An association, Unvaniez Koad Kev, was created to promote Perrot's legacy. In 2005, a crisis arose over an attempted takeover by members of the far-right Adsav party.

== Publications ==
- Alanik al Louarn. Pe "n'euz den fin n'en deuz e goulz". Pez c'hoari plijadurus rimet e daou Arvest, Brest, Moullerez "Ar c'hourrier", 1905
- Buez ar zent, Ar Gwaziou, Morlaix, 1911
- R. G. Berry, Eun nozveziad reo gwenn Translation from Welsh to Breton by Geraint Dyfnallt Owen and Jean-Marie Perrot of Noson o Farrug (One frosty night), (Plougerne, 1928). [Drama] Performed by Bleun-Brug theatre company inLesneven 1928. http://bibliotheque.idbe-bzh.org/document.php?id=eun-nozveziad-reo-gwenn-18682&l=fr
- Special 30th anniversary edition 1936 of Ouvres Bretonnes: http://bibliotheque.idbe-bzh.org/data/cle_52/Bulletin_de_lUnion_des_Oeuvres_Bretonnes_1936_nA78_.pdf

== See also ==
- Bleimor (Scouting)
