= Pierre Péron =

French caricaturist, illustrator and printmaker

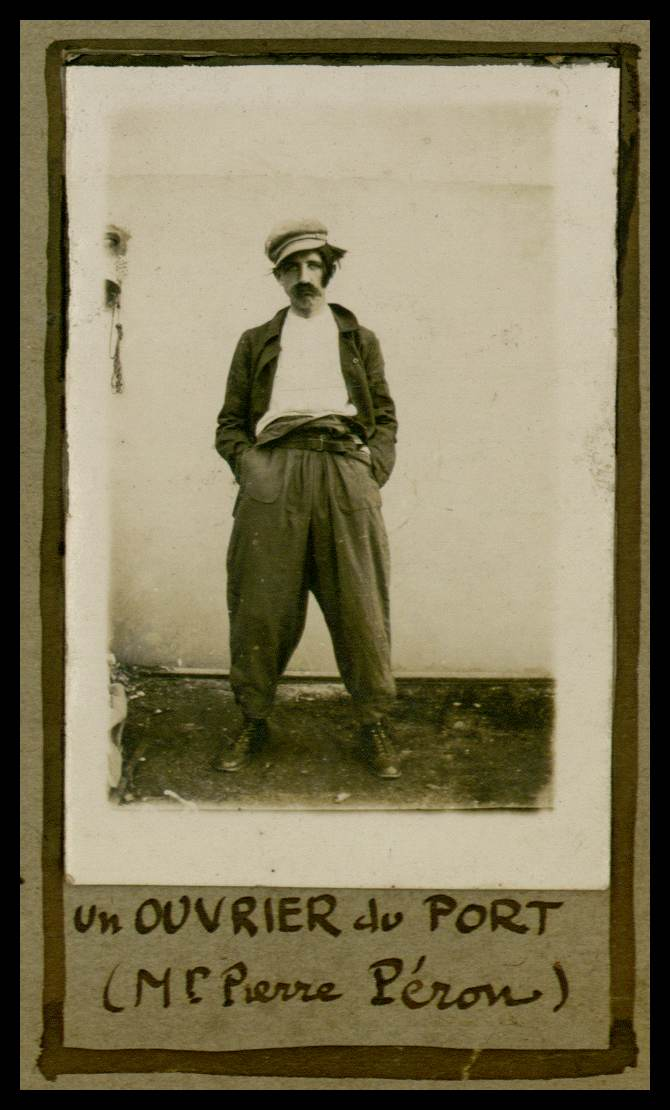
Photo of Pierre Péron, actor of the 4th act of Maurice Marchand's "Oh Ys" operetta

Pierre Péron (1905–1988) was a French caricaturist, illustrator and printmaker.
