= Seiz Breur =

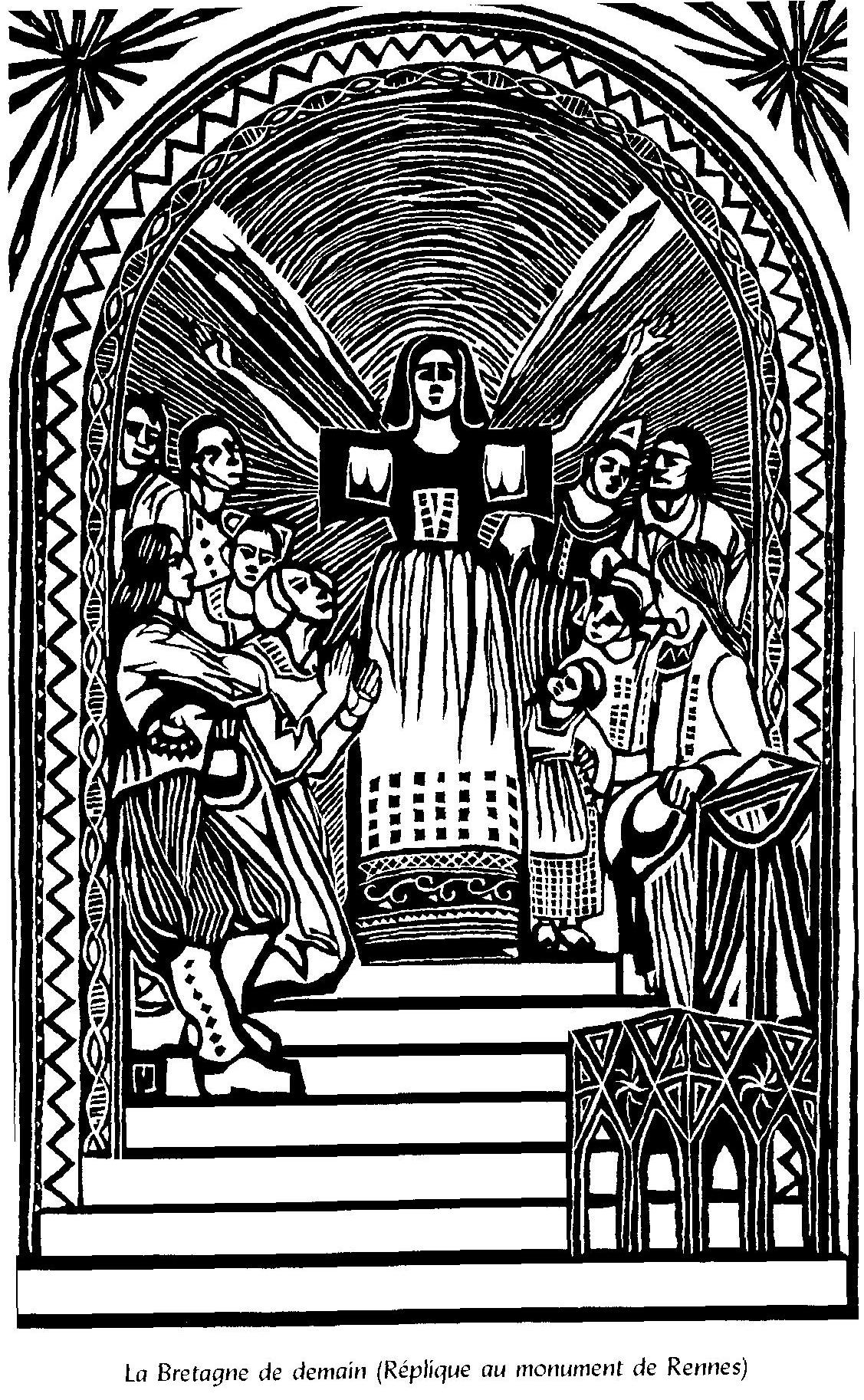
Brittany of the Future, by Jeanne Malivel

Seiz Breur was an artistic movement founded in 1923 in Brittany. Although it adopted the symbolic name seiz breur, meaning seven brothers in the Breton language, this did not refer to the number of members, but to the title of a folk-story. At its height it had fifty members united as the "Unvaniezh Seiz Breur" (Union of the Seven Brothers).

Though predominantly dedicated to the visual arts, the group also included writers, composers and architects. It is recognised today as an initiator of modern Celto-Breton art, but its memory has been marred by the association of several of its members with Nazi ideology and collaborationism.

== Origins ==
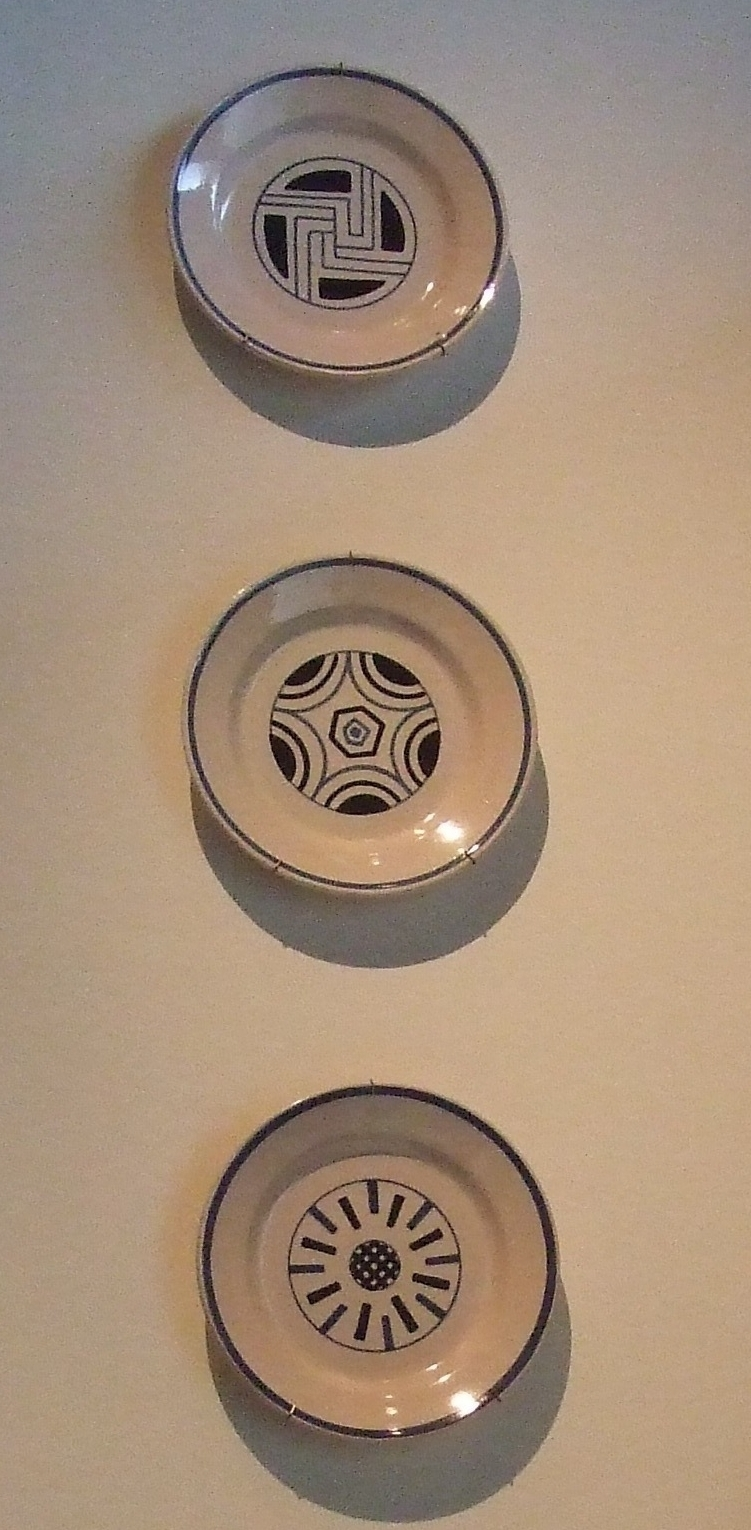
Ceramics designed by Suzanne Creston

A young designer and illustrator, Jeanne Malivel (1895–1926), played an important role in paving the way for the movement's foundation. Her early work revived the tradition of wood engraving to illustrate the book L'Histoire de notre Bretagne by Jeanne Coroller-Danio. Malivel's work was picked up by the painter and engraver René-Yves Creston, along with his wife Suzanne Creston and the architect James Bouillé. These three young Breton artists met in 1923 at a Pardon in Le Folgoët, and decided to work together at creating a modern form of Breton art, combining the best of the traditional with avant-garde styles.

== Name ==
The name they chose refers to Ar Seiz Breur (The Seven Brothers), a folk-tale collected and published by Malivel in its Gallo language form. It tells the story of a beautiful and virtuous young woman who finds her lost seven brothers, but is then victimised by an evil witch who turns the brothers into cows. One of the cows is a small Breton cow and "the young girl always loved best the Breton one". She is seen by the king who marries her, but the witch throws her into a precipice. The witch also tries to make the king kill the Breton cow. However, the cows lead the king to their lost sister, who is restored, and the brothers regain human form. The story was interpreted as a metaphor for devotion to Brittany and of threats to its existence.

== Early history ==
The movement arose from ideas broadly similar to the Arts and Crafts Movement inflected by the earlier activities in Brittany of the Synthetists of the Pont-Aven School. It was based on the idea that traditional Breton art, so rich in the past, had become stagnant for some of the following reasons:

- The spread of non-Breton styles encouraged by the influence of the mass media, such as "Saint Sulpice" style statues replacing the old-style polychrome wooden statues in churches; needlework patterns copied from Parisian papers replacing traditional costume designs.
- Monuments to the fallen of World War One were becoming standardised (chosen from a catalogue of monumental clichés: Poilu, or Gallic rooster, in a dubious style badly adapted to local architecture and stone).

The group's goal was not just to fossilize traditional art and design, but to open the way for artistic plurality in a variety of different disciplines: Architecture; Craft; Design; Literature; Music; Painting; Sculpture.

- wood carving, faience, stoneware, stained glass windows, sculpture, ironwork, cabinetmaking, embroidery, weaving, fresco, illustration, typography, etc.,
- using new material, such as concrete, or new techniques, such as photocollage or cinema
- using different methods of diffusion: from books to postcards, via stamps, calendars, jewellery, toys, furniture, cushions, mugs or posters.
- producing embroidered banners, delft statuettes, or clothes and objects with liturgic Breton character, pour faire barrage à l’art sulpicien (to make a barricade against 'sulpician' art).

== Members ==
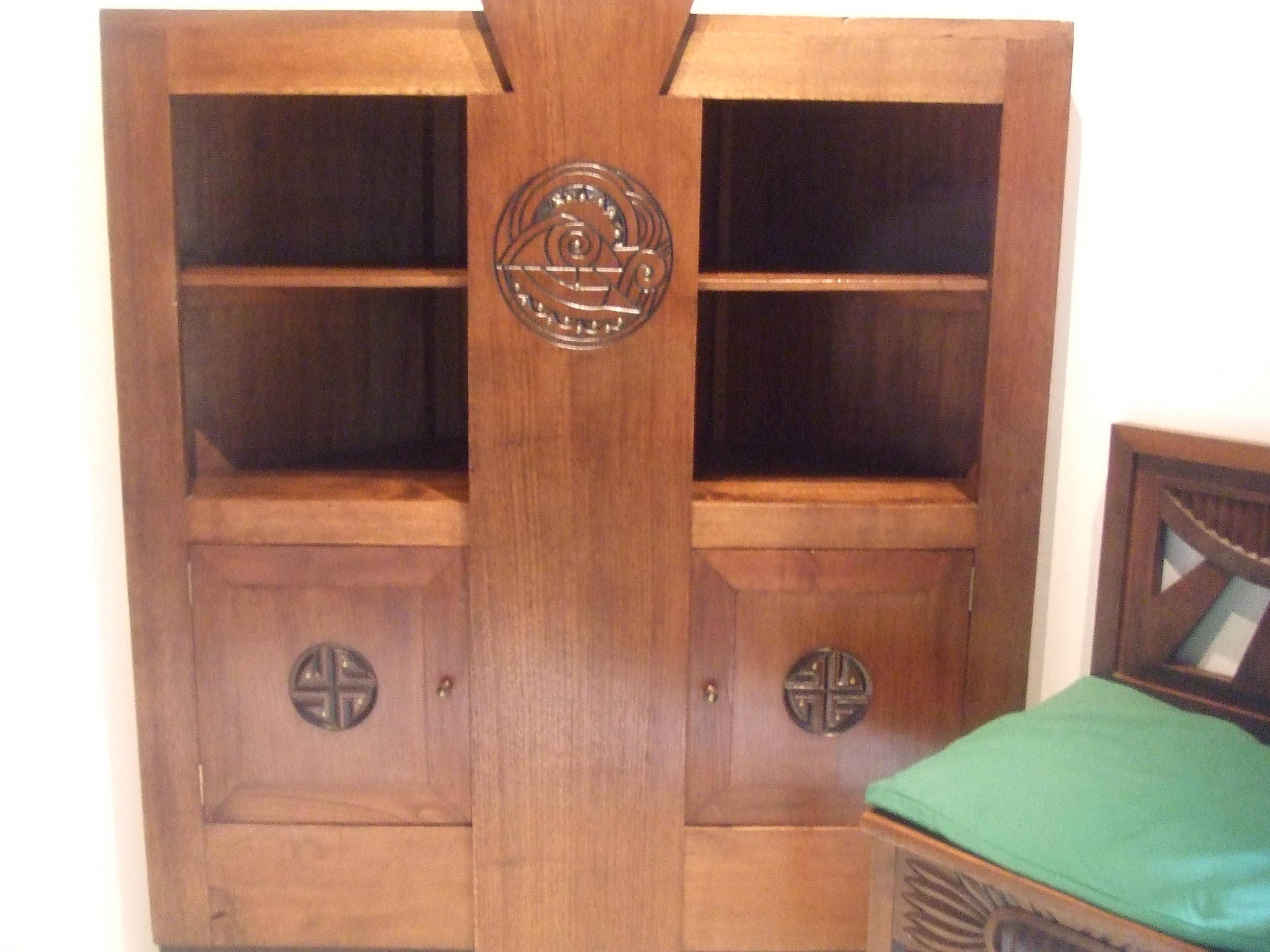
Cabinet designed by Rene-Yves Creston for the wedding of François Debeauvais and Anna Youenou

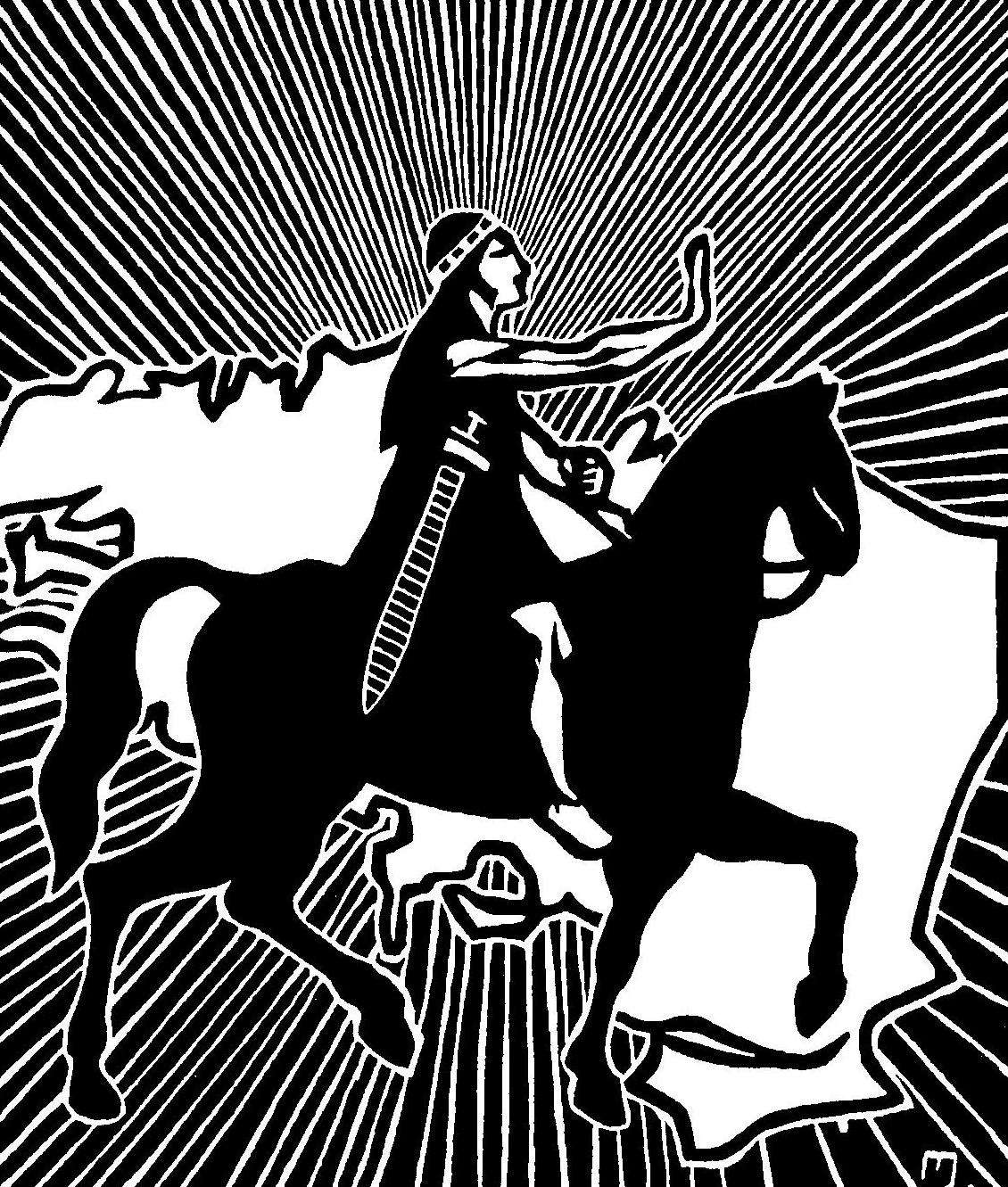
Nominoe Triumphant: Tad ar Vro, a depiction of Nevenoe (Nominoe) by Jeanne Malivel.

Some of the most notable members:

- composers Paul Ladmirault, Jef Le Penven and Paul Le Flem
- painter, engraver and novelist Xavier de Langlais
- sculptors Jean Freour, Yann Goulet, Francis Renaud, Jules-Charles Le Bozec and Raffig Tullou
- embroider Georges Robin
- haute couture stylist Val Riou
- illustrators Xavier Haas, Robert Micheau-Vernez and Pierre Péron
- woodworker Joseph Savina
- architects James Bouillé and Olier Mordrel
- writers Jeanne Coroller-Danio, Gwilherm Berthou (aka "Kerverziou")
- editors Herry Caouissin and Ronan Caouissin
- publicist and novelist Youenn Drezen
- professor of fine arts Morvan Marchal, creator of the modern day Flag of Brittany (Gwenn ha Du)
- string player Dorig Le Voyer
- schoolmasters Yann Sohier, and Marc'harid Gourlaouen, promoters of the teaching of the Breton language

and

Georges Arnoux, Octave-Louis Aubert, André Batillat, Yves Berthou, Yvette Brelet, Suzanne Creston, Herri Kaouissin, René Kaouissin, Reun Kreston, Edmond Derrouch, Fañch Elies (Abeozen), Jean Guinard, Marguerite Houel, Germaine Jouan, Roger Kervran, Marcel Le Louet, Christian Le Part, Régis de l'Estourbillon, Dorig Le Voyer, Madeleine Lizer, Édouard Mahé, Jean Mazuet, Robert Micheau-Vernez, Jacques Motheau, Michael O'Farrel, Francis Pellerin, Charles Penther, Pierre Péron, François Planeix, Yann Robert, Georges Rual, René Salaün, René Salmon de la Godelinais, Gaston Sébilleau.

== Sources of inspiration ==
- Celtic mythology, including Welsh and Irish
- Druidism
- Breton legends, such as Brocéliande, the Matter of Britain (especially stories of King Arthur and Merlin), or popular themes such as Ankou
- Breton history
- religion: Pardons (Breton religious festivals) or pilgrimages, saints, and Celtic heroes.
- daily rural or maritime life

== Chronology ==
The Seiz Breur made a name for themselves at Parisian exhibitions in 1925 and 1937 and at Brittany's pavilions.

- 1923 : Artistic collaboration started
- 1925 : Participation at the l’Exposition des Arts décoratifs in Paris
- 1926 : Death of Jeanne Malivel.
- 1928 : Launch of the review Kornog (Western) in which the Seiz Breur members write their theories. The group renames itself Unvaniez Seiz Breur (Union of Seven Brothers).
- 1929 : Breton art exhibition in Douarnenez.
- 1931 : Keltia replaces Kornog as the journal.
- 1937 : Pavillon de la Bretagne, exposition in Paris.
- 1939 : WWII causes mobilisation of various members.
- 1940 : publication of Programme de Seiz Breur dans un manifeste en 13 points (Seiz Breur's manifesto in a 13-point programme).
- 1940-1944 : Exhibitions in Rennes or Paris under the name Eost Breiziz (Breton harvest).
- 1944 : Xavier de Langlais replaces René-Yves Creston as president of the group
- 1947-1948 : The end, with Raffig Tullou as the final secretary.

=== Collaborationism in World War II ===
One faction within the group, led by the architect Olier Mordrel and the sculptor Yann Goulet had moved from the politically neutral statement neither red nor white, just Breton to outright nationalism, fascism and collaboration, hoping that a German victory would bring independence to Brittany. Both became members of the Breton National Party, which declared its support for Germany on the outbreak of war.

During the occupation of France, Mordrel and others were involved in setting up collaborationist ventures. 1942 saw the birth of the Institut celtique, absorbing members of Seiz Breur and a diverse range of Bretons. In the meantime, a manifesto signed by the Seiz Breur announcing the role of Brittany in post-war Europe appeared in La Bretagne, a newspaper edited by Yann Fouéré. This text reminded readers of the lesson in "racial vitality" they gave at the International Exhibition in 1937. Political disputes involving the war and nationalist controversies led to the union's closure in 1944. Like much of the Breton movement, at the end of the war the group collapsed amid accusations of collaboration.

Between 2000 and 2001 an exhibition dedicated to Seiz Breur was shown at the Musée de Bretagne in Rennes and in then in other four galleries around Brittany. The exhibition documented the group's links to Breton nationalism and the extreme-right. However, only a handful of its members were linked to the latter.
