= Bleun-Brug =

Catholic Association

Bleun-Brug (Flower of the Heather) is a Catholic association that is oriented towards Breton nationalism.

== Origins ==
The group was created in 1905 by abbé Jean-Marie Perrot, with a name devised at the 1905 conference of the Union Régionaliste Bretonne at Château de Kerjean. The heather symbolizes Breton tenacity. The association had the motto: Ar brezhoneg hag ar feiz a zo breur ha c'hoar e Breizh. ("Breton and faith are brother and sister in Brittany.")

The association fights to preserve Breton faith, language, and traditions. To accomplish this, it holds an annual party featuring Breton theatre, song, and lectures.

== Magazine ==
The magazine Feiz ha Breiz, which first existed from 1865 to 1884, was restarted by Bleun-Brug in 1899, eventually becoming the official mouthpiece of the association.

== Post-War ==
Bleun-Brug was guided mainly by abbot Perrot over a period of forty years, with the goal of maintaining Breton traditions and the usage of the Breton language amongst the rural populations of Lower Brittany. It was a true Catholic movement, subject to the bishopric of Quimper. The statutes of the association, established in 1912, were amended in 1925 to define its two objectives:

- To promote the Breton ideal intellectually, politically, and economically.
- To contribute, as Catholics, to realising in Brittany the full scope of its traditional faith.

Bleun-Brug declined in the 1970s.
