= Jeanne Malivel =

Breton artist who supported Breton nationalism

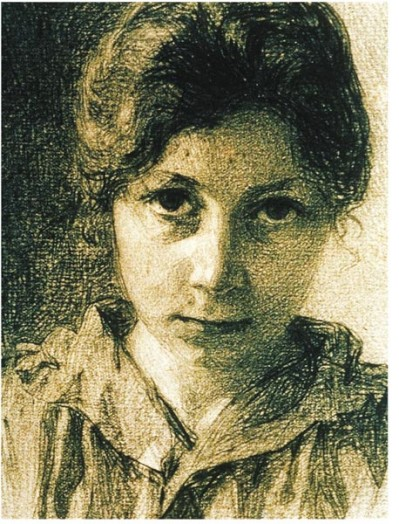
- Self-portrait by Malivel
- Born: 15 April 1895; Loudéac, Brittany, France
- Died: 22 September 1926 (aged 31); Rennes, Brittany, France
- Movement: Seiz Breur

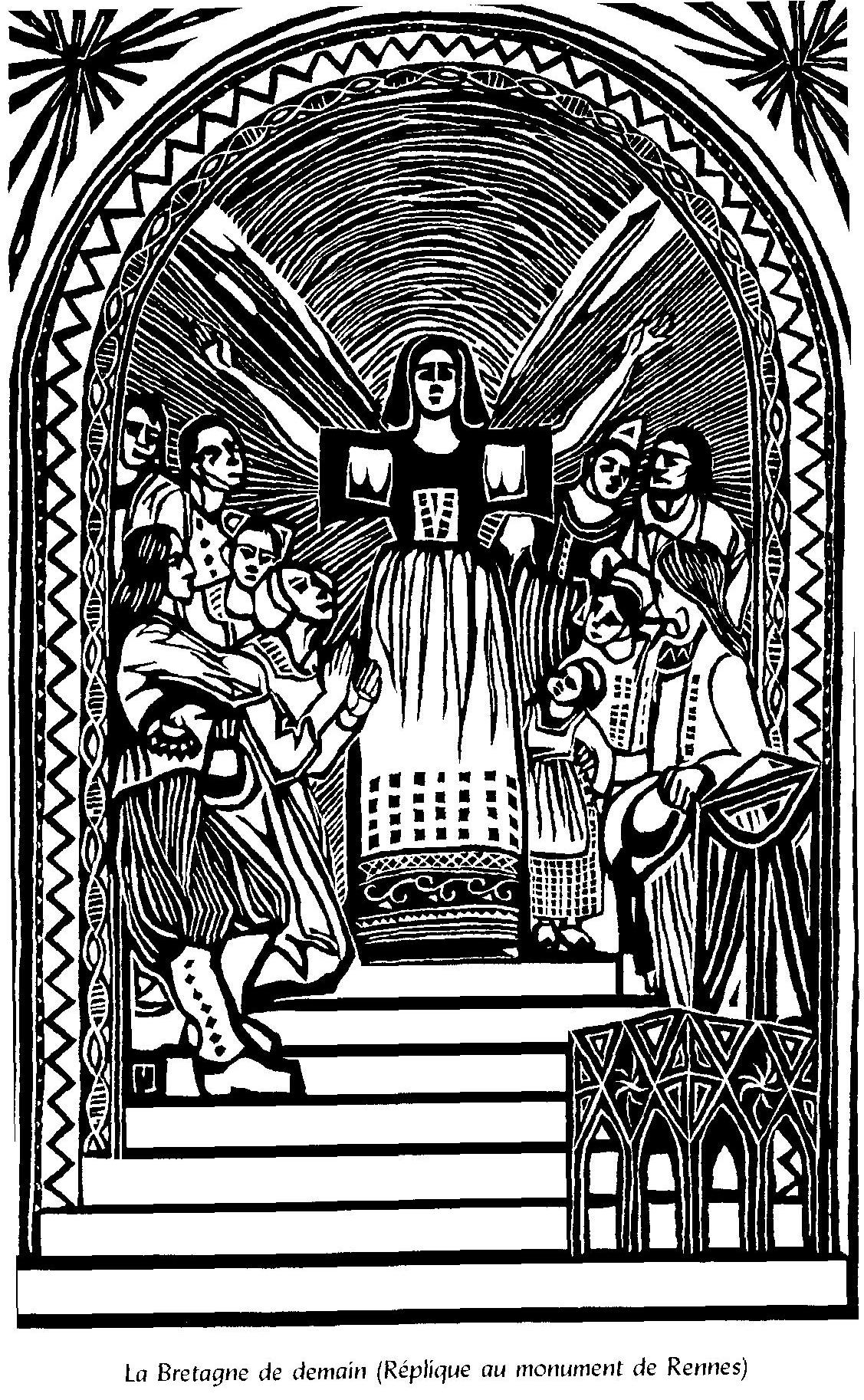
Illustration depicting Brittany of the Future by Malivel

Jeanne Malivel (French pronunciation: [ʒan malivɛl]; 15 April 1895 – 2 September 1926) was a Breton designer and illustrator who inspired the Breton nationalist art movement Seiz Breur.

Born in 1895 in Loudéac to a family of traders, her secondary studies in Rennes at the Institution de l’Immaculée Conception, included art courses by Louise Gicquel (1876–1956), who noticed her talent. In 1915, during the First World War, she became a nurse at Loudéac military hospital. The following year, Malivel entered the Académie Julian in Paris.

She revived the art of woodblock printing in her illustrations for the Breton nationalist book The History of our Brittany by Jeanne Coroller-Danio in 1922. These illustrations were influenced by the earlier Synthetism of Paul Gauguin and Émile Bernard.

The images were greatly admired by René-Yves Creston, who considered them to provide the basis for a revived Breton style in art. Creston collaborated with Malivel on a number of works and in the pair set up Seiz Breur, which quickly grew in influence. The title of the movement was derived from a folk story about seven brothers ("seiz Breur" in Breton) collected and published by Malivel.

Malivel also painted works in fresco, and designed furniture, embroidery and ceramics. She participated in the International Exhibition of Decorative Arts and Modern Industry in 1925, showing furniture collaboratively designed with Creston. Following her sudden and early death at the age of 31 in the following year, in Rennes, leadership of the movement fell to Creston. She was buried in Loudéac.

== Artworks ==
Jeanne Malivel touched upon various mediums throughout her career. She mainly did woodblock prints and illustrations, but she also created murals and contributed to the decorative arts with ceramics and furnitures.

=== Woodblock painting and illustrations ===
Jeanne Malivel was an important figure who contributed to the renewal of wood engraving in Brittany. She drew inspiration from Irish art and the early Middle Ages. Her engraved work consisted of more than 150 woodblock engravings which were mostly destined for publication. Her most famous work is The History of our Brittany.

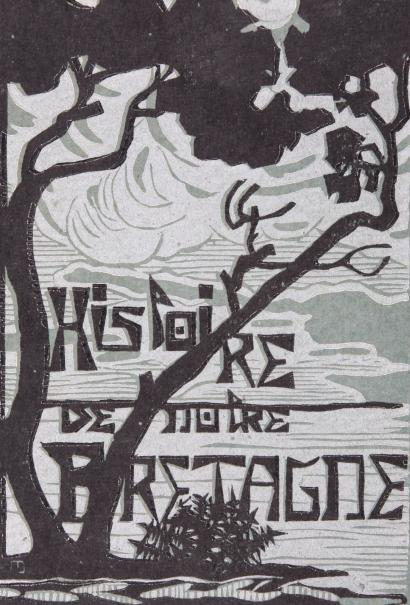
The History of our Brittany

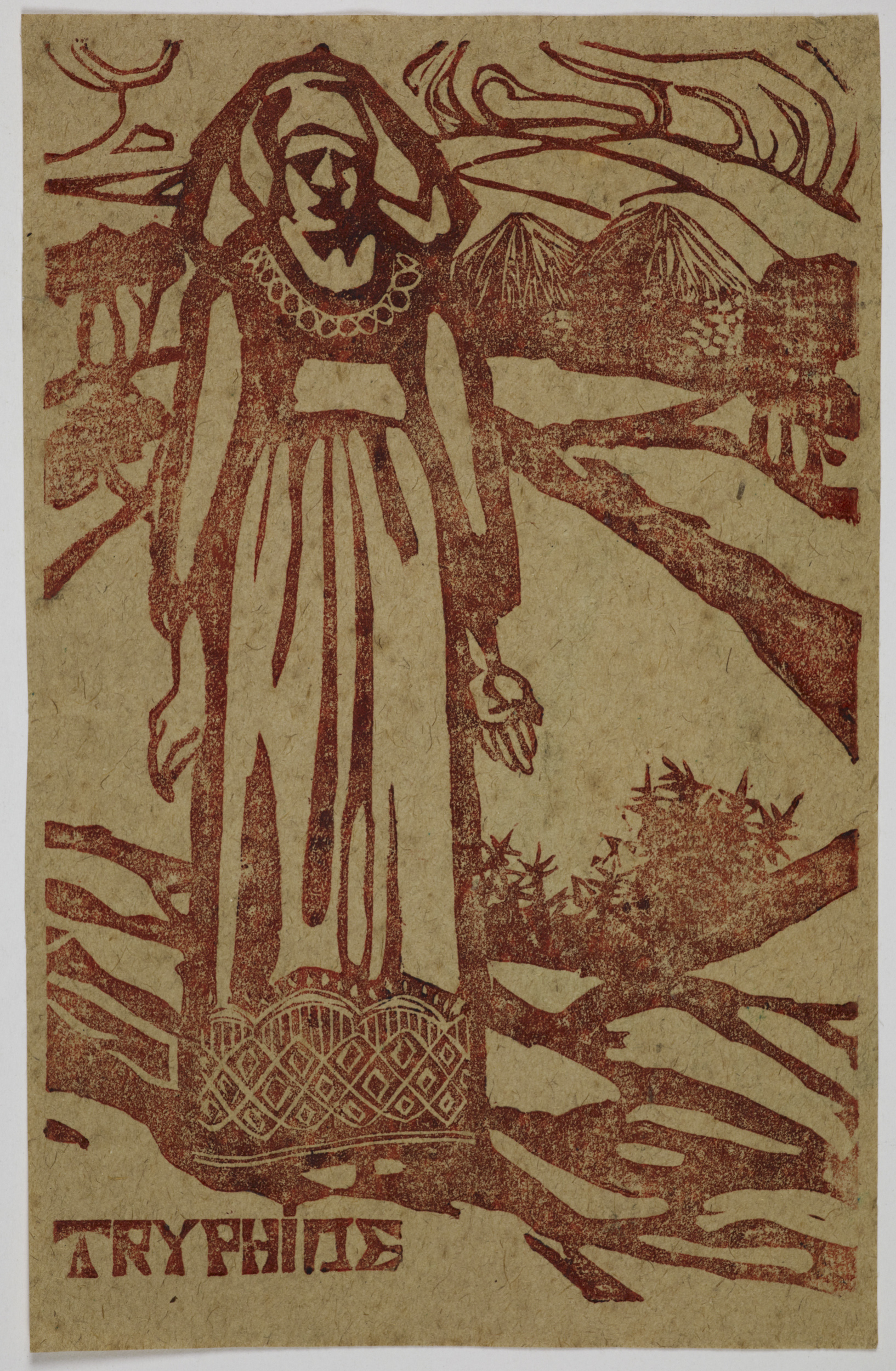
Sainte Tryphine

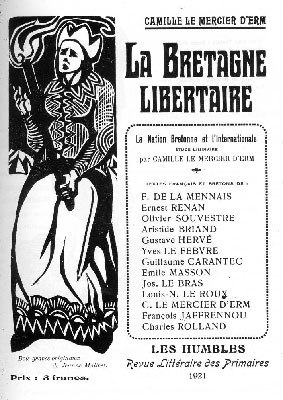
La Bretagne Libertaire

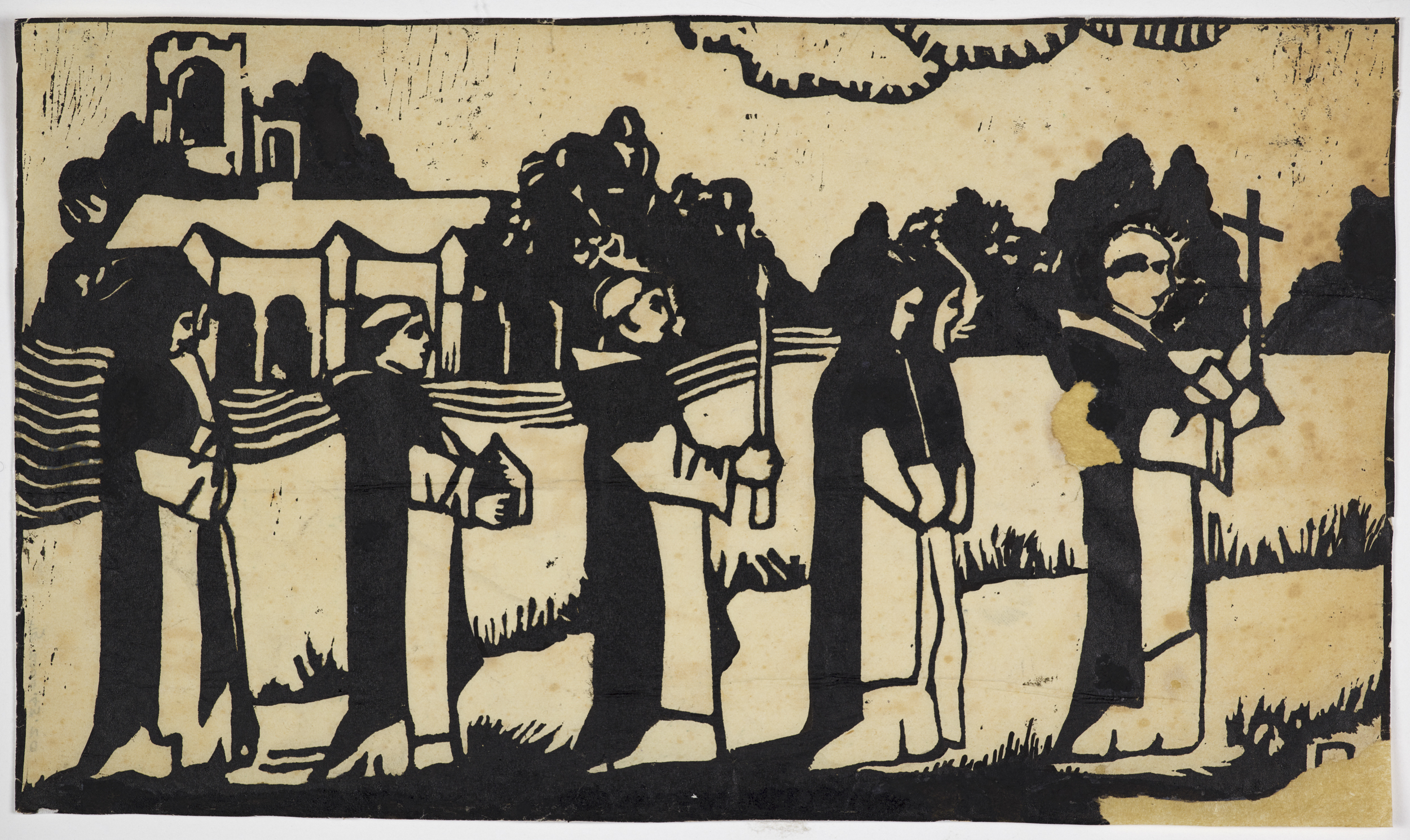
Engraving of a monastic procession
