= Bigoudène =

Traditional women's coif of Brittany

Les Bigoudènes
A woman's traditional "Breton hat" or a woman wearing traditional costume and hat in Brittany.
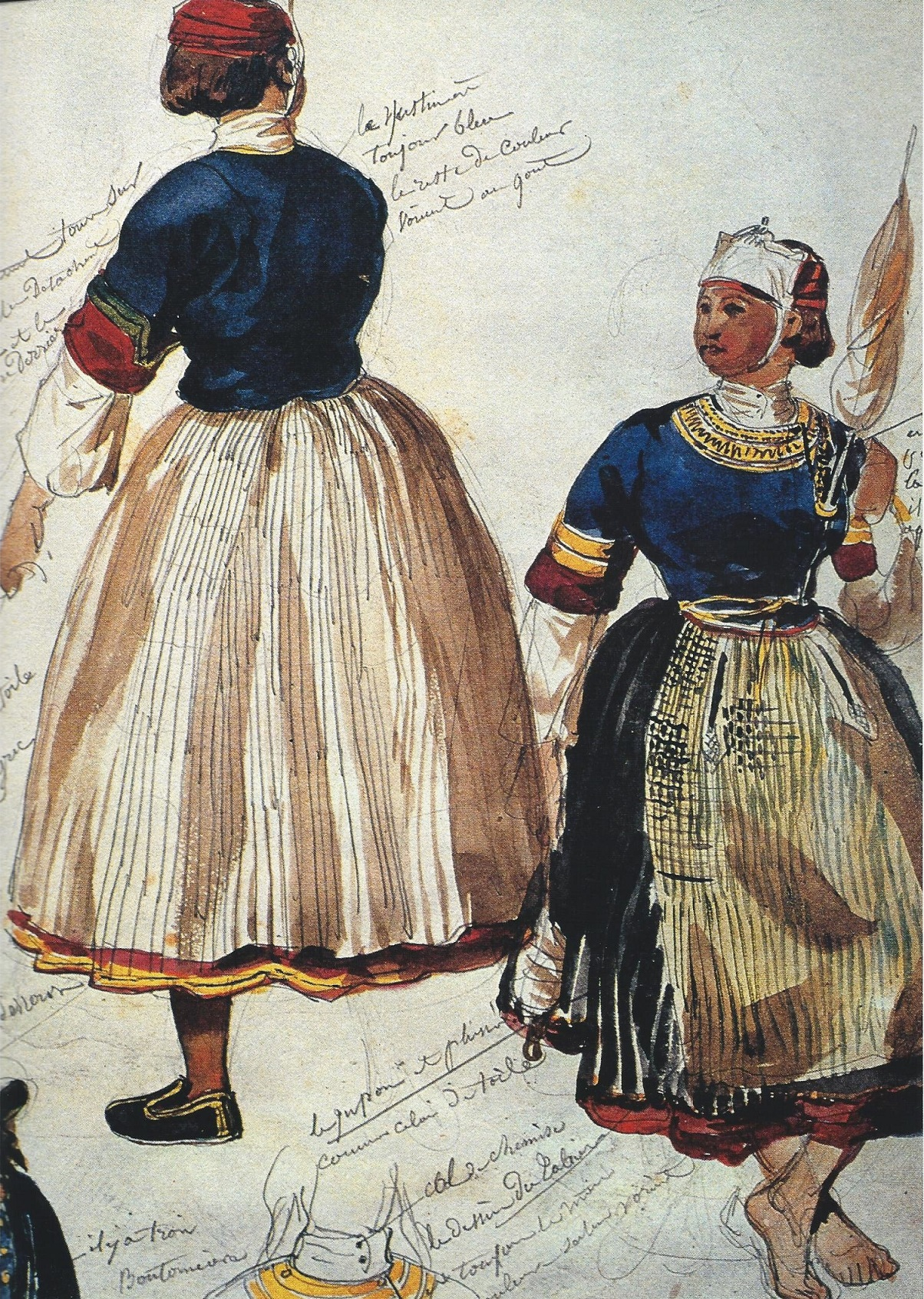
- Bigoudènes, François Hippolyte Lalaisse, 1848.

Languages
- Breton language and French language.

Religion
- Christianity (mainly Breton mythology)

A coiffe bigoudène (Breton: pennwisk bigouden) refers to a 30–40-cm high "Breton hat," or coif, worn by women with traditional Breton costume. By extension, the women wearing the coif and the costume associated with it are also called bigoudènes.

The bigoudène coif is worn by the women of the Bigouden Country (Breton: Bro-Vigoudenn; French: Le Pays Bigouden) historically known as "Cap Caval" and located along the Bay of Audierne (Bro Kernev), south-west of Quimper, Brittany. They have been officially based in the French departement of Finistère since 1790.

The term bigoudène should not be confused with "bigoudénnie", the geographical concentration of these women, and with the Bigouden region.

== Etymology ==
The first attestation of the term bigoudène being used in the French language (from Breton: bigoudenn) was in 1881 in the Revue des deux Mondes (French: [ʁəvy de dø mɔ̃d], Review of the Two Worlds). It had been used in the Breton language around 1830 through the meaning: "headdress of linen or cotton worn in the region of Pont-l'Abbé". It is related to the terms bigoudi (hair curler), bigot (part of the racage from a yard on top of a traditional square rigged ship) and bigue (kind of pulley, type of spar used as a crane).

Here and there, a man from Pont-l'Abbé proudly displays his superimposed jackets, on which brightly colored woolen ribbons stand out as well as sometimes a holy ciborium embroidered on the back. The women of this same village whose strange figure is reminiscent of the Lapland type, wear the hair brought back to the top of their head and kept by a narrow braiding headdress, are called bigoudènes. Their dress has a liveliness of oriental color: wide yellow or scarlet breastplates, corsages and cuffs supported by silver, green skirts embellished with dazzling embroidery.

— André Theuriet, "Douarnenez, landscapes and impressions", Revue des Deux Mondes, volume 43, 1881

=== Literary quotes ===
- "Very strong, vaulted, thick waist, they [the women from Plomeur] wear three skirts of cloth superimposed (...) and they are wearing the strange bigoudène coif, kind of variegated headband that hides their ears and lets see from behind, their hair up." ― (François Coppée, Prose, Mon franc-parler I, 1894, p. 115)
- "But nothing could stop the stubborn bigoudène." ― (Hervé Bazin, Who I dare to love, 1956, page 37).

== History ==
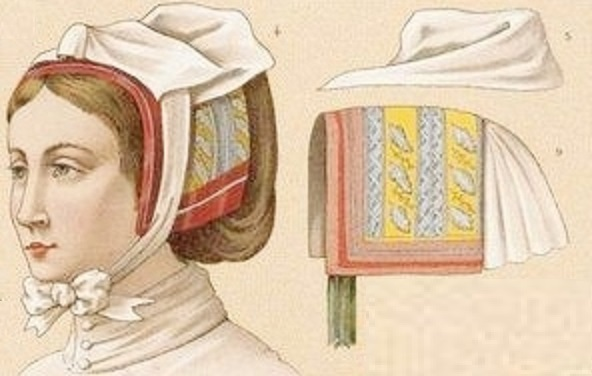
First headdress, made with a headband embroidered with silk. Behind, the hair is pulled up under the headdress.

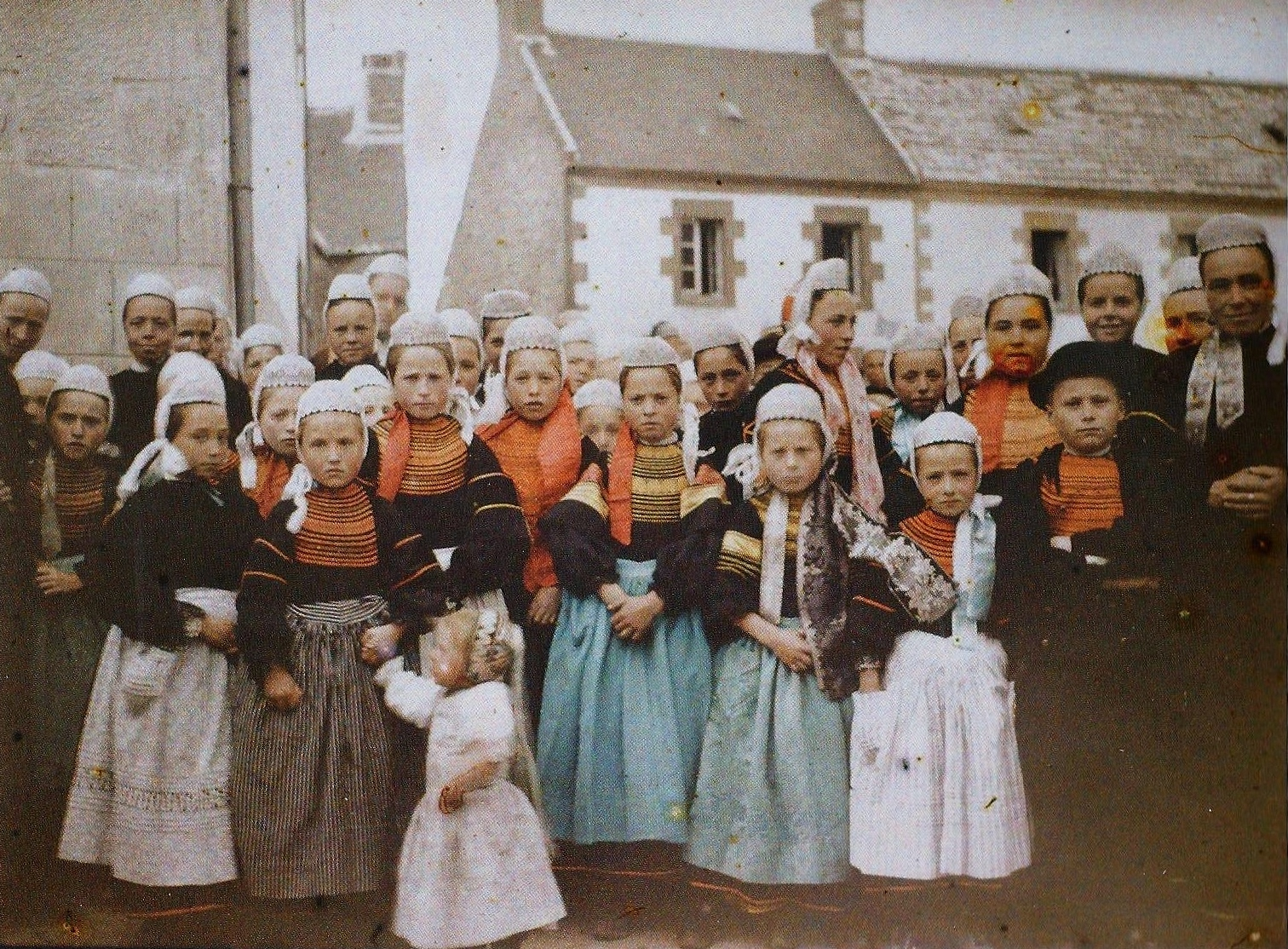
Bigoudènes after the mass in Plonéour-Lanvern (1900) by Paul Michels (1866-1944).

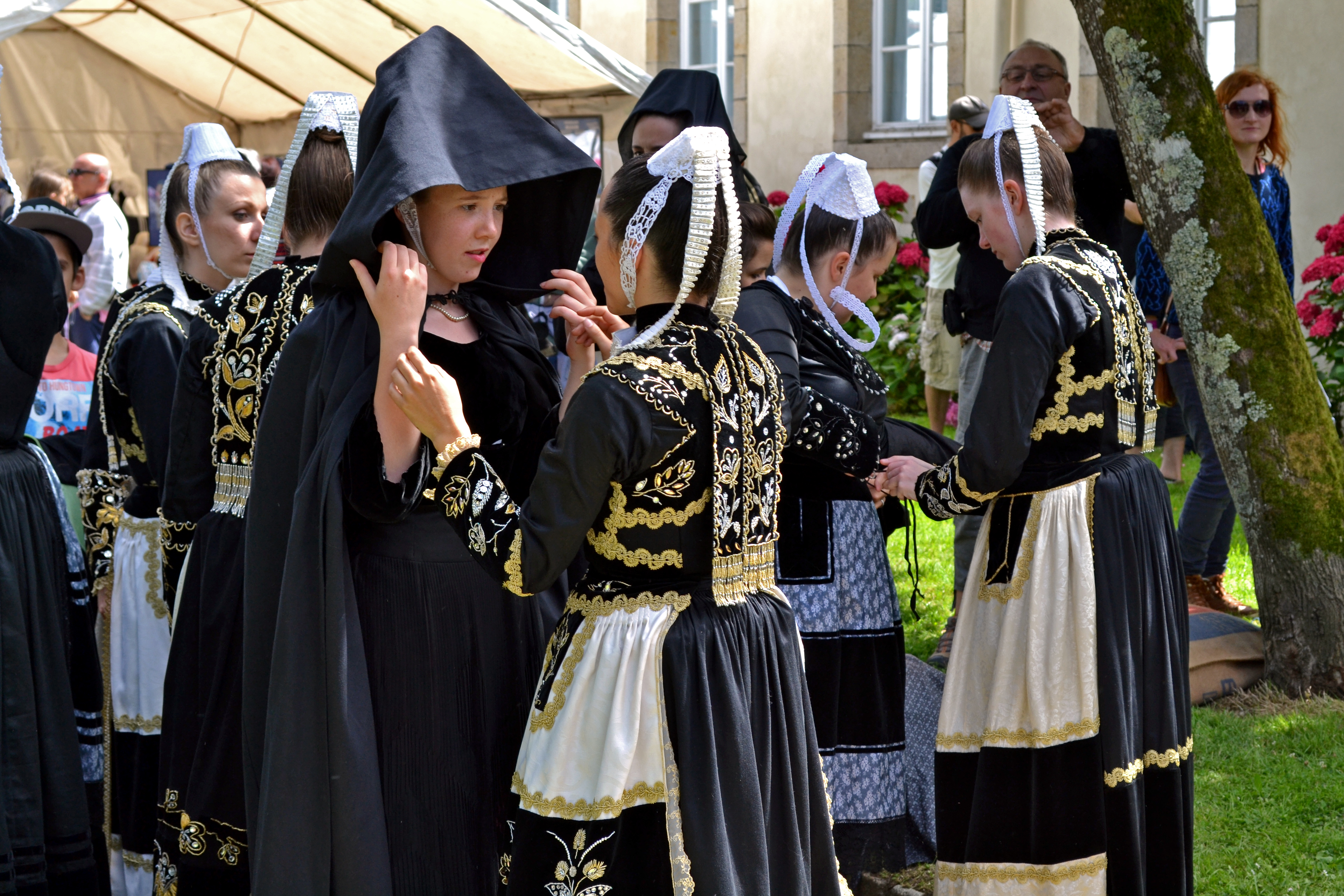
Women wearing traditional Bigoudènes cloth at the festival called Fête des Brodeuses in Pont l'Abbé (2014).

Contrary to a widespread legend encapsulating the headdresses’ size as a response to the cut steeples cut during the Revolt of the papier timbré (anti-fiscal revolt in the west of Ancien Régime France, reign of Louis XIV from April to September 1675); the bigoudène headdress only became really high in the twentieth century, especially in the Interwar period (November 1918 - September 1939) where it gained a centimeter per year. The maximum height of the cap is reached at the end of the Second World War, when the Breton costume started to become old-fashioned.

The high headdress is for ceremonies or states of mourning: the everyday headdress worn during the daily work is a simple black velvet ribbon around the comb and behind which one concealed the chignon. In 1977, 31% of women over 47 years old wore the headdress. This figure drastically decreased to only 500 women (of all ages) in 1993. In 2011 Maria Lambour was one of the last women to wear this headdress on a daily basis. Today it is worn only during cultural events and by rare women on an almost daily basis.

On 11 June 2018 the then doyenne (eldest) of the Bigoudènes, Marie Pochat, died at the age of 102 in her native Brittany. She was one of the last few irreducible Bretons still wearing the headdress. Born on 29 February 1916 in Léchiagat (now Treffiagat) in the Bigouden country, Marie Pochat regularly wore the headdress from the age of 12. "Without this headdress, I feel that I am missing something," she told France 3 Brittany on the occasion of the celebration of her centenary in 2016. Only a handful of Bretons still wear this lace headdress, a true symbol of Brittany that appeared in 1747. In 2015 the Museum of Brittany had hosted an exhibition by photographer Charles Fréger showing the considerable richness and diversity of Breton headdresses.

== Sartorial aspects ==
The confection of the bigoudènes' traditional costume is recognized as a landmark of French sartorial heritage and high craftsmanship. The oldest known Bigoudène headdress dates back to 1830; still ample, the headdress largely covers the hair; limited to a small rectangle, the embroidery is nascent. It is exhibited at the Bigouden Museum in Pont-l'Abbé. One of the most important sartorial events for bigoudènes is the "Feast of Embroiderers" (French: Fête des Brodeuses) taking place every year in July in Pont-l'Abbé, Finistère, Brittany.

== In the arts ==
Numerous artists immortalized the bigoudènes such as:

- Henri Guinier (1867–1927)
- François Hippolyte Lalaisse (1810–1884)
- Henri Delavallée (1860–1943)
- Georges A. L. Boisselier (1876–1943)
- Albert Racinet (1825–1893)
- Georges Lacombe (1868–1916)
- Lucien Simon (1861–1945)
- Joseph-Félix Bouchor (1853–1937)
- Émile Malo-Renault (1870–1938)
- Paul Gauguin (1848–1903)
- Pascal Dagnan-Bouveret (1852–1929)

== In popular culture ==
In the French-speaking world, since the 1970s, television commercials from Breizh Cola and most importantly the French food industry company "Tipiak" have been portraying elderly women dressed as Bigoudènes while shouting "Tipiak, Pirates!". This famous slogan propelled the term "Tipiak" to become synonymous with "hacker" in web communities and now refers to hackers or counterfeiters.

The sticker made by the textile enterprise À l'Aise Breizh symbolizing a small figure wearing a bigoudène headdress is stuck on more than 1.5 million cars across the world as of July 2011 and has become a popular symbol of recognition for Bretons.

The bigouden coiffe is part of local identity, almost in tourist brochures.

== Pâtisserie ==
The Bigoudène briochée (Brioched Bigoudène) is a pâtisserie popularized during the Tourelle des Perdrix' centenary in Loctudy. It is composed of a raised dough wrapped around a cylinder and cooked on a spit and slowly browned. It is sold on city markets around the bigoudénnie and most preponderantly in Locronan regularly elected "one of the most beautiful villages in France". There are two kinds of those pastry headdresses: a savoury one with emmenthal and black olives and the other ones, sweet, covered with sugar or chocolate. The idea was partly inspired by the Eastern countries (Romania, Hungary) where they are very fond of this type of dough put aside to rise for a moment before being put on a grill.
