= Élisabeth Sonrel =

French painter and illustrator (1874–1953)

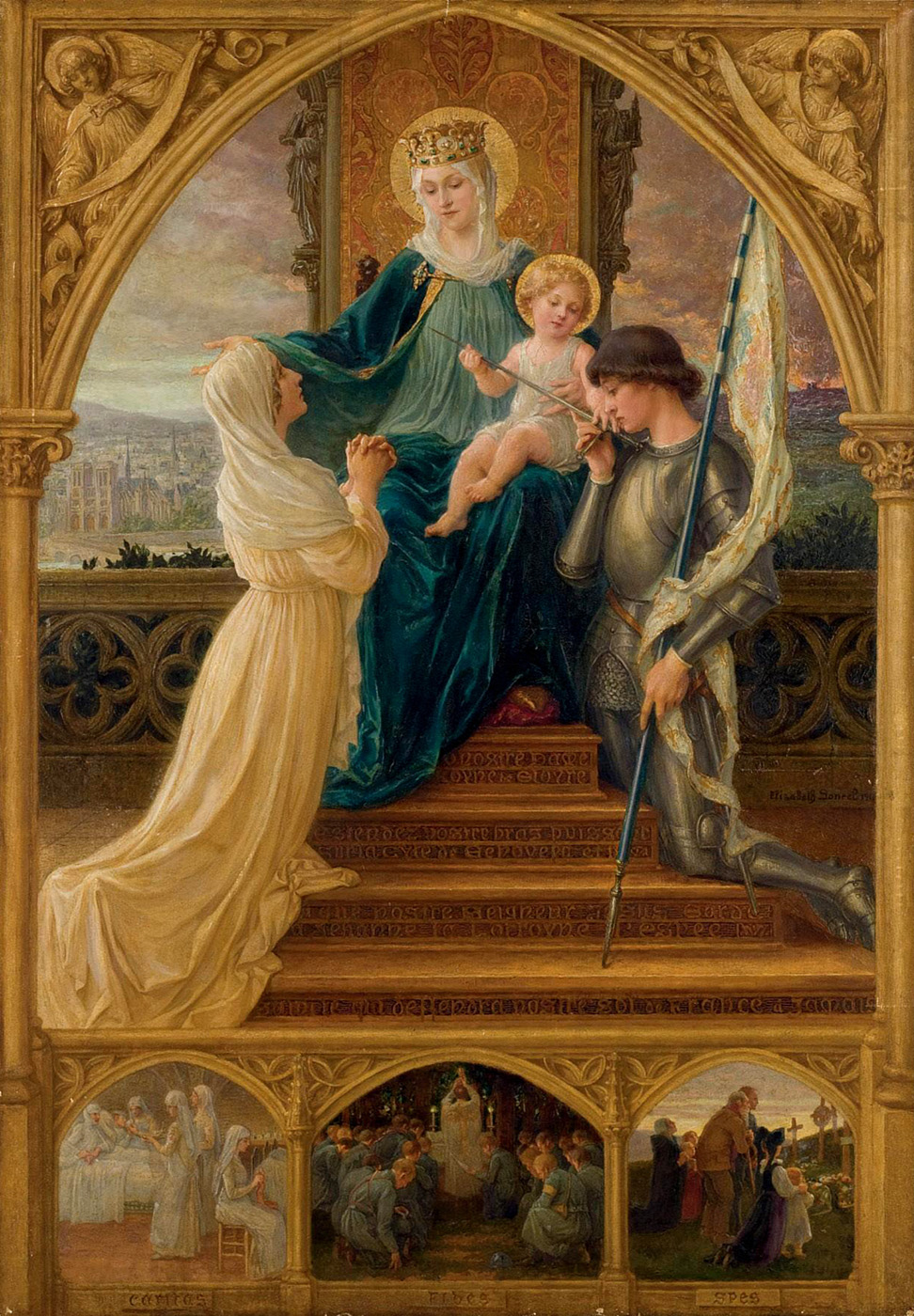
Virgin And Child, Between Saint Geneviève And Joan Of Arc, 1916

Elisabeth Sonrel (1874 – 1953) was a French painter and illustrator in the Art Nouveau style. Her works included allegorical subjects, mysticism, symbolism, portraits, and landscapes.

Born in Tours, she was the daughter of painter Nicolas Stéphane Sonrel, who was also her first teacher. For further study she went on to Paris as a student of Jules Lefebvre at the Ecole des Beaux-Arts.

In 1892 she painted her diploma work, Pax et Labor, which was to be displayed at the Musée des Beaux-Arts de Tours. From then on she exhibited at the Salon des Artistes Français between 1893 and 1941, her signature pieces being large watercolors in a Pre-Raphaelite manner, which she adopted after a trip to Florence and Rome, discovering the Renaissance painters – some of her work having clear overtones of Botticelli. Her paintings were often inspired by Arthurian romance, Dante Alighieri's 'Divine Comedy' and 'La Vita Nuova', biblical themes, and medieval legends. Her mystical works include 'Ames errantes' (Salon of 1894) and 'Les Esprits de l’abime' (Salon of 1899) and 'Jeune femme a la tapisserie'.

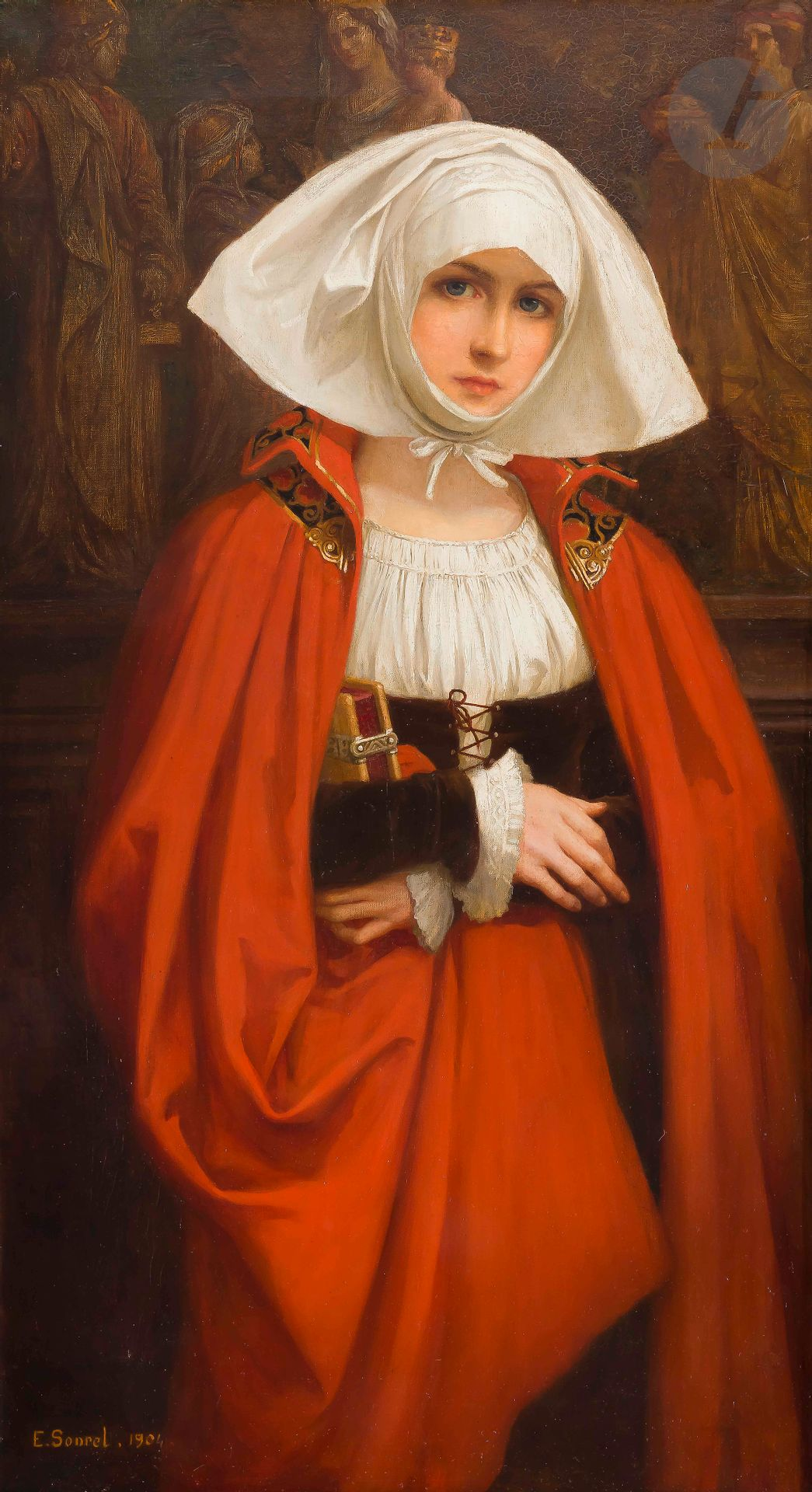
Young Woman with a Headdress (a cornette), 1904

At the Exposition Universelle of 1900, the primary theme of which was Art Nouveau, her 1895 painting 'Le Sommeil de la Vierge' (Sleep of the Virgin), was awarded a bronze medal, and the Henri Lehmann prize of 3000 francs by L'académie des Beaux-Arts. From 1900 onwards she confined her painting to portraits, scenic Brittany landscapes, and the occasional flower study. She made regular painting trips to Brittany, inspired by the forest of Brocéliande, and from 1910 to various places on the coast such as Concarneau, Plougastel, Pont-l'Abbé and Loctudy, often staying at inns and accompanied by one or two students. She painted several works in Le Faouët before constructing a villa in La Baule in the 1930s. Working mainly in watercolour and gouache, she discovered a ready supply of models among young girls in the area, and found Bretons generally to be friendly, honest and self-confident.

Her final exhibit at the Salon was in 1941 at the age of 67. There is also a record of her having exhibited at Liverpool. In her early years Sonrel produced posters, postcards and illustrations, in Art Nouveau style.

She died in Sceaux, Hauts-de-Seine in 1953.

== Gallery ==
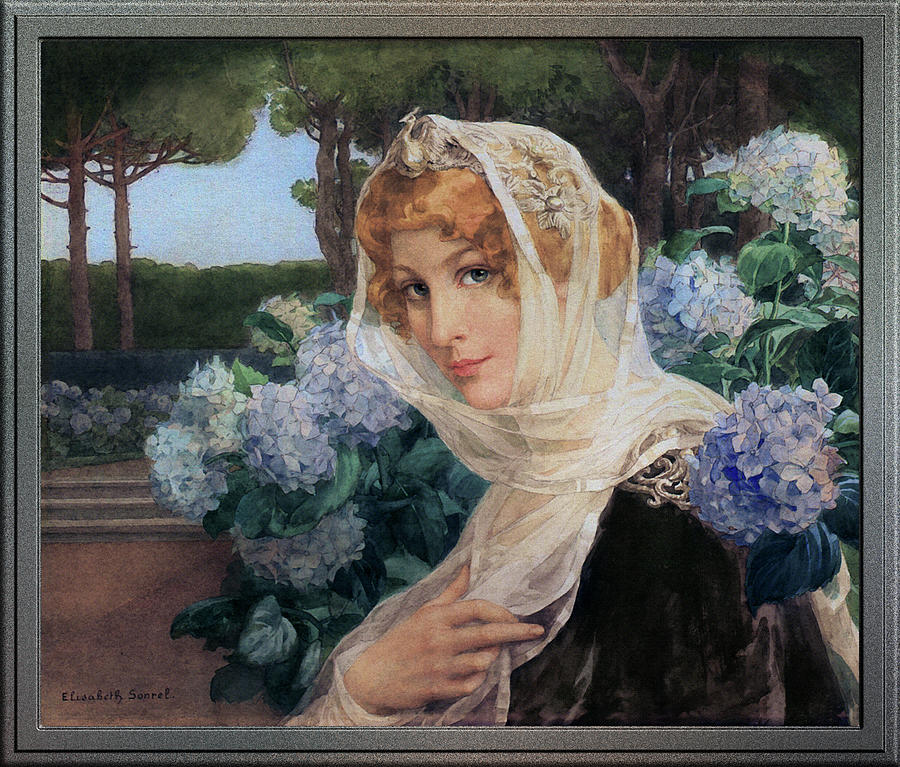
Young Woman with Hydrangeas

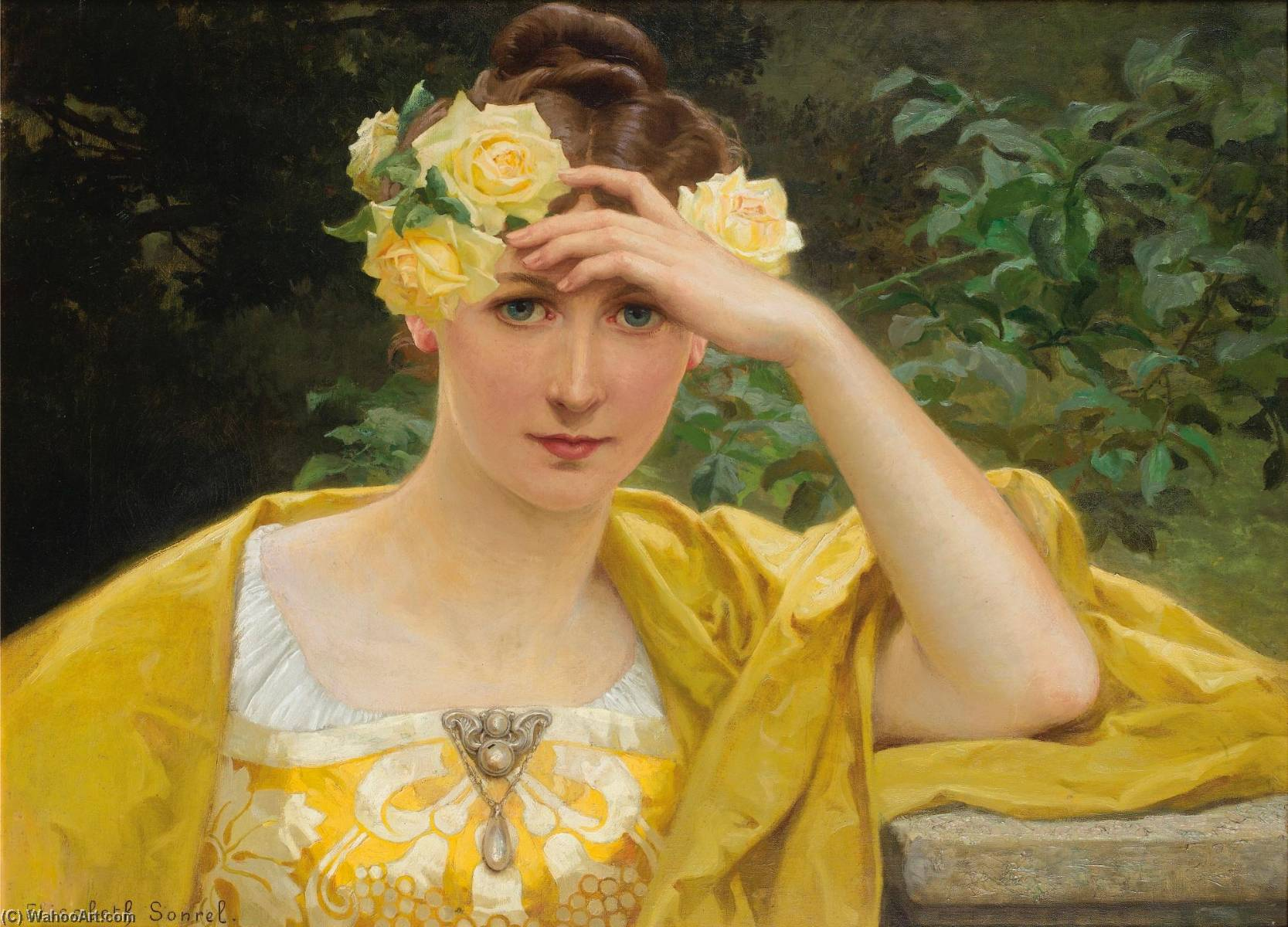
Young girl in yellow

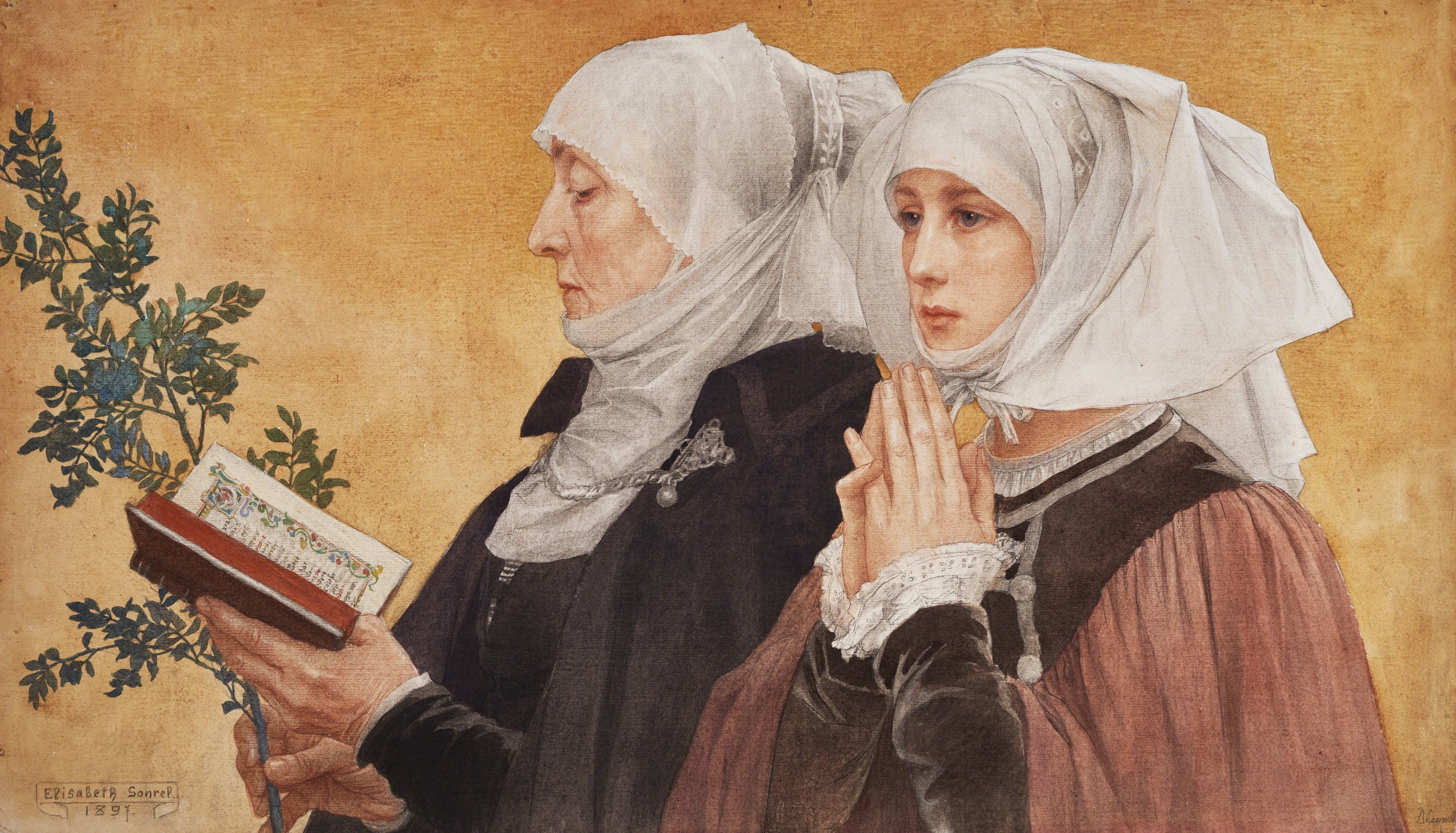
Les Rameaux (Palm Sunday), 1897

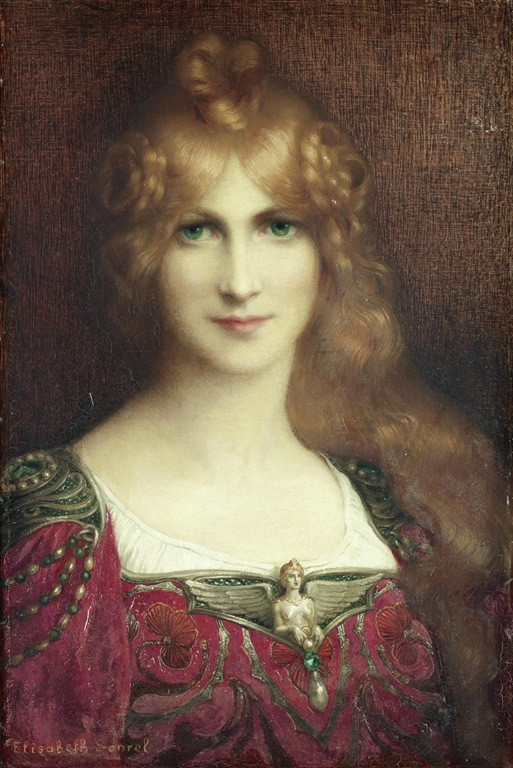
A young lady

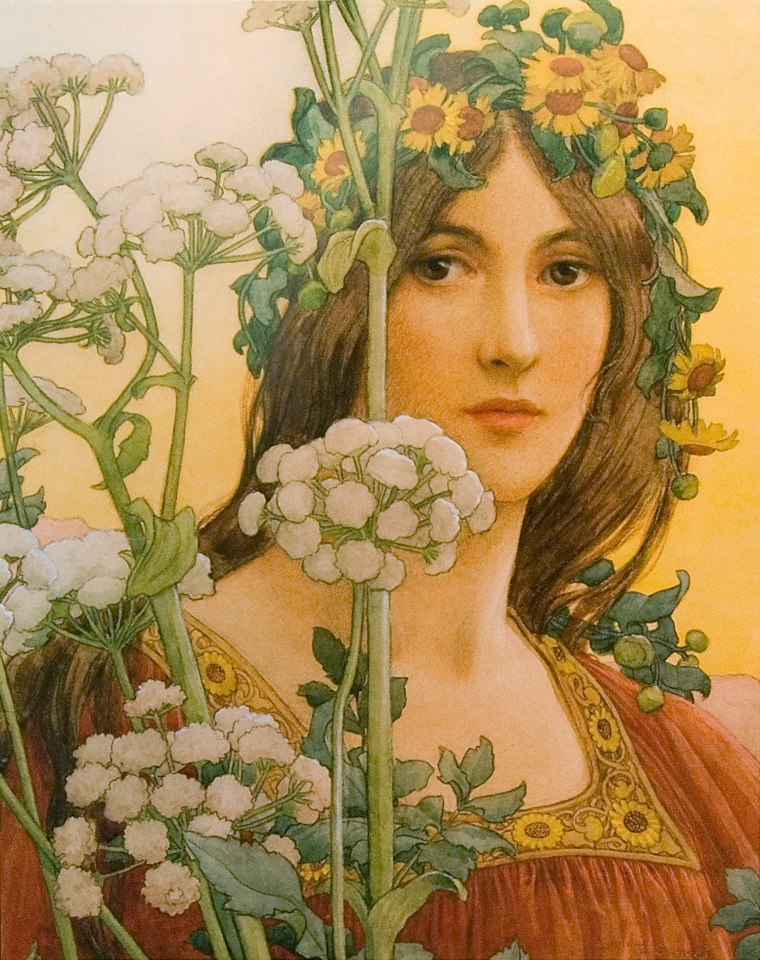
Our Lady of the Cow Parsley., 1923

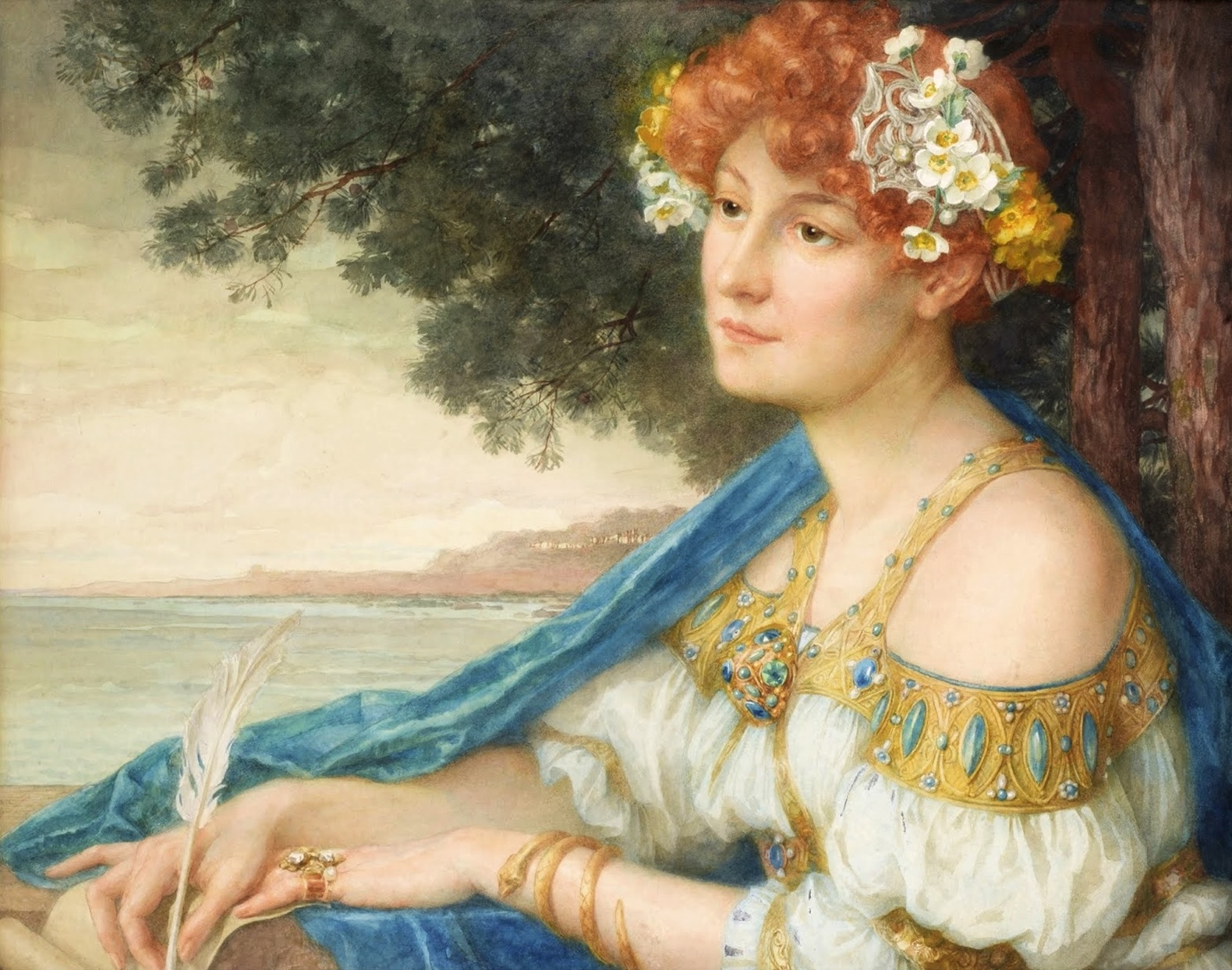
Catherine La Rose
