= Jean Tirilly =

French painter

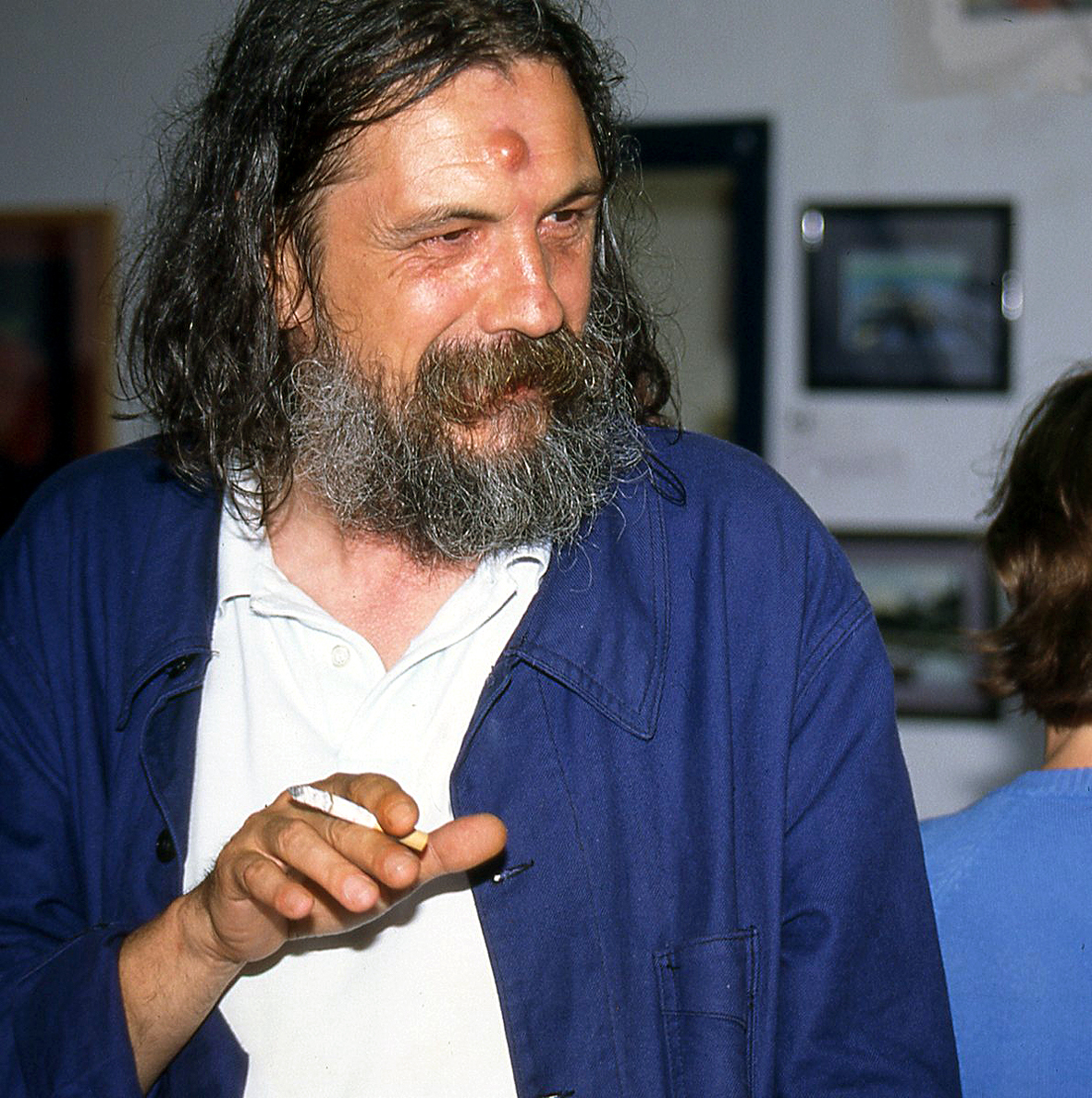
Jean Tirilly, during the Crust Fair organized by Arts Guil in August 1998 at Guilvinec, at l'Abri du Marin

Jean Tirilly (1946–2009) was a French painter, born in 1946 in Léchiagat, Brittany, France. He painted in the Outsider Art tradition coined by the British art critic Roger Cardinal in 1974, first studied by the German psychiatrist and art historian Hans Prinzhorn in the 1920s, and popularized as Art Brut by the French abstract artist Jean Dubuffet in the 1950s. Tirilly's oeuvre stands among the strongest contemporary examples of Art Brut in Europe. His deft technique and unusual sense of vision and purpose, however, stand in sharp contrast to the commonly prescribed features of Art Brut, notably autodidacticism and dissociativism. As such, Tirilly is also a proponent of Marginal or Singular Art (in French, L'art singulier), an art current that eschews many of the habitual artistic qualifiers be they subject, style, method, or purpose. His work is included in the Neuve Invention section of the important Collection de l'art brut in Lausanne, Switzerland.

== Early life ==
A self-taught artist, Tirilly began painting in 1986 at age 40. Prior to his genesis of the late 1980s, he lived a largely piecemeal life. He trained as a navy mechanic, enlisted in the Marine Nationale, and travelled the globe for a number of years aboard the Foch aircraft carrier. He then resettled in France, working odd jobs in Brittany while cultivating the elaborate visions of quotidian life in coastal Finistère that had always consumed him and would later constitute his central subject. During a childhood marked by the absence of television, Tirilly's exposure to the absurd and unusual emerged ironically out of his provincial milieu: travelling circuses, drunken bouts between village mendicants, delinquent apple thieves, village idiots, and the host of passers-by and external influences that coloured Breton village life through the second half of the twentieth century.

== Work ==
Codex CCCLXIX, acrylic on paper, 1999

Codex DLXXXIX, acrylic on paper, 2001

While it is difficult to ascribe influences to Tirilly's work, references to formative elements can be found. The macabre and lugubrious tone of his paintings is in part attributed to the artist's esteem for the work of fifteenth century Dutch painter Hieronymus Bosch. Tirilly's litany of contorted and tormented characters also calls to mind the late works of Francisco Goya, the figural works of Francis Bacon, the portraits of Lucian Freud, and the oneiric netherworlds of Odilon Redon, all the while maintaining characteristic differences between the influence and the influenced. His palette and swatch-like application of colour seem strongly influenced by the Pont-Aven School artists, notably French compatriots Paul Gauguin, Paul Sérusier, and Émile Bernard, and the Art Brut tradition out of which he painted had as much to do with Jean Dubuffet as with general countercultural trends in post-World War II French art. Ultimately however, Tirilly's work defies direct influence. The derivatives are so tangential, the oeuvre of such extreme individuality that most attempts at having the paintings accord with formally accepted critical notions and forebear influences are easily quashed.

Tirilly's paintings are largely autobiographical, each image capturing childhood memories, family relatives, personal hardships, or transient pleasures. Despite the apparent anguish in his work, humanizing elements such as family, friendship, and nostalgia temper bleakness with hope, suffering with redemption. Self-portraits are common but typically framed within the context of memory or dream. Tirilly's paintings are meticulously catalogued via a system modelled on the Aztec and Maya codices; a codex number is assigned to each completed work and subsequent paintings follow in numerical succession. He favoured board and paper over canvas and acrylic paints over oils claiming the media were better suited to his work.

Tirilly's body of work is unique among the output of autodidact artists working consciously within the rough-hewn parameters of Outsider Art. While the label is no doubt limiting, the artist's atypical ability to combine the fantastic with the banal, personal distortion with autobiography, and joy with torment is a strong example of the tripartite tension between academism, realism, and neophytism central to the traditions of Naïve, Raw, and Outsider art.

Jean Tirilly died in 2009 leaving behind one of the finest, most idiosyncratic bodies of work in French outsider art history.

== Galeries ==
- Galerie Benoot, Knokke-Heist, Belgium
- Galerie Jakez, Pont-Aven, France
- Galerie l'Aquarelle, Quimper, France
- Galerie Zaiß, Aalen, Germany
- SüdWestGalerie, Niederalfingen, Germany
- Biz’Art-Biz’Art, Le Vaudioux, France

== Selected exhibitions ==
- 1995: The painters of the summer at Guilvinec, exposition organisée par Arts Guil
- 2008: Riec-sur-Bélon, France
- 2013: Pont-Aven, France
- 2012: «Retrospective », Pont-Croix, France
- Le hang-art, Saffré, France

== Selected collections ==
- Collection de l'Art Brut, Lausanne, Switzerland
- Musée d’Art Spontané, Brussels, Belgium
