= Serge Duigou =

French historian

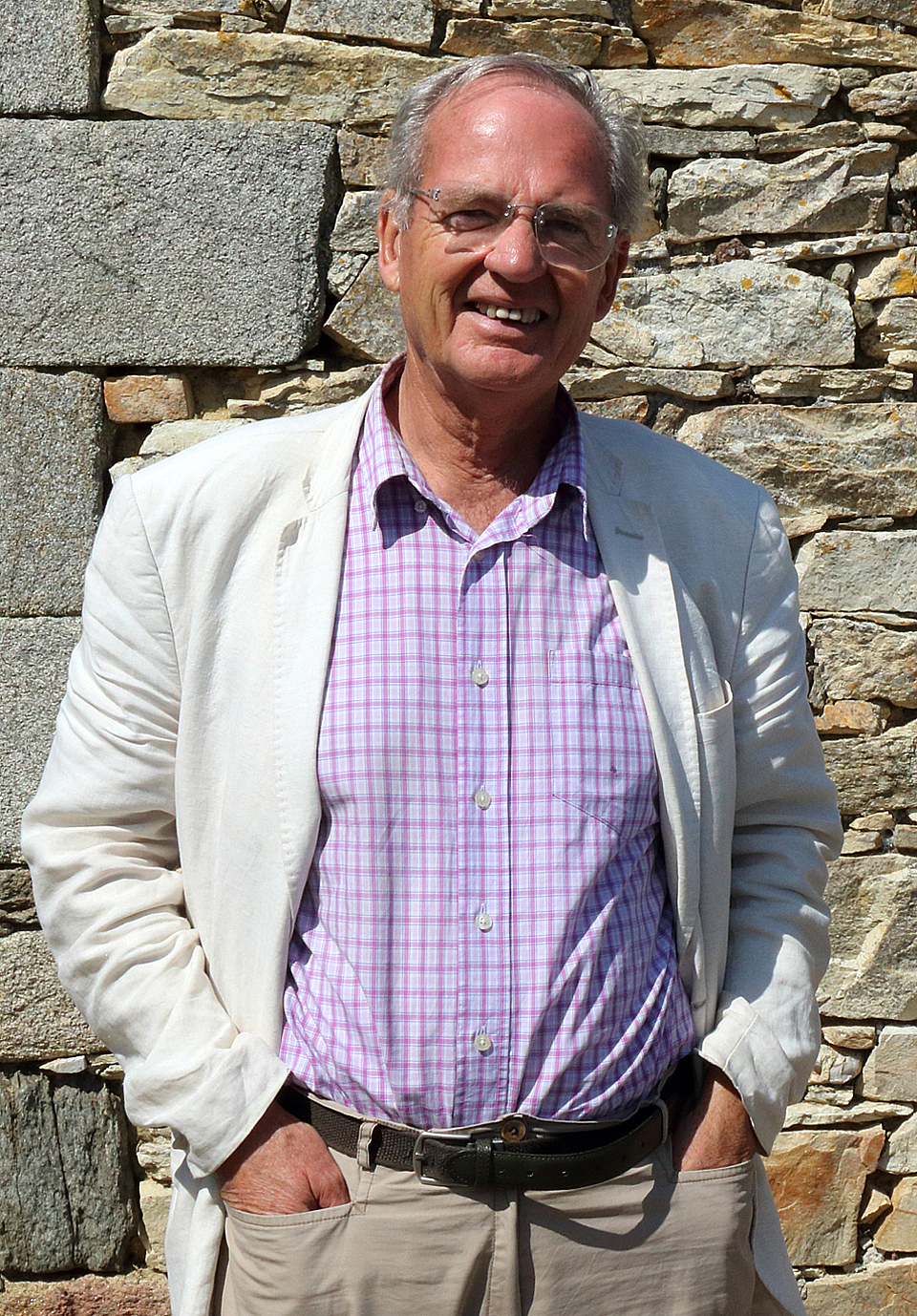
Serge Duigou

Serge Duigou (born 7 August 1948 in Pont-l'Abbé, Pays Bigouden in sud-Finistère) is a French historian, specialising in the history of Brittany. His work focuses on Breton maritime history, the women's place in the Breton society and economy, the links between Brittany and modernity (rail, tourism, industry, festivities, etc.), the migratory movements from and to Brittany, the Breton popular revolts. His numerous conferences, books and articles aim to make Breton history known to as many people as possible.

== Works ==
- Serge Duigou (1979). La Bretagne ayant dansé tout l'été. Le Signor.
- Serge Duigou (1982). Les pêcheurs de l'an II: l'Ile Tudy sous la Révolution. Éditions Ressac.
- Serge Duigou (1983). Quand les Bigoudens sillonnaient les mers. Editions Ressac.
- Serge Duigou (1985). Images du Morbihan. Editions Jos.
- Serge Duigou, Germain Lacasse (1987), Marie de Kerstrat, l'aristocrate du cinématographe, Editions Ressac.
- Serge Duigou (1989). L'Australie oubliée de Saint-Allouarn. Editions Ressac.
- Serge Duigou (1989). La révolte des Bonnets Rouges en Pays bigouden. Editions Ressac.
- Serge Duigou (1994), Les mystères de Penmarc'h, Editions Ressac.
- Serge Duigou (1997), Les coiffes de la révolte, Editions Ressac.
- Serge Duigou (1998). Les Robinsons des Glénan. Editions Ressac.
- Serge Duigou (2000). A voyage through Brittany. Editions Jos.
- Serge Duigou (2001). Patrimoine religieux de Bretagne. Editions Jos.
- Serge Duigou, Germain Lacasse (2002). Marie de Kerstrat. Editions Ouest-France.
- Serge Duigou, Jean-Michel Le Boulanger (2002). Histoire du Pays bigouden. Editions Palantines.
- Serge Duigou (2002), Penmarc'h, Editions Le Télégramme.
- Serge Duigou (2004). Nos ancêtres auvergnats, l'immigration auvergnate en Bretagne. Editions Ressac.
- Serge Duigou, Jean-Michel Le Boulanger (2005). Cap-Sizun, Au pays de la pointe du Raz. Editions Palantines.
- Serge Duigou (2006). Châteaux en Bretagne. Editions Jos.
- Serge Duigou; Jean-Michel Le Boulanger (2006). Quimper. Editions Palantines.
- Serge Duigou (2008). Manoirs et châteaux du Finistère. Editions Palantines.
- Serge Duigou, Olivier Garros, Jacques Godin (2008). La rivière sans nom. Editions Les îles du désert.
- Serge Duigou, Annick Fleitour (2009). Pont-l'Abbé, au cœur du Pays bigouden. Editions Palantines.
- Serge Duigou (2010). L'Odet plus belle rivière de France. Editions Palantines.
- Serge Duigou (2012). Voyage en Bretagne. Jos. ISBN 978-2-85543-322-6.
- Serge Duigou, Jean Failler (2013). La Cornouaille dans tous ses états. Editions Palantines.
- Serge Duigou (2013). Balade en Finistère. Editions Jos.
- Serge Duigou (2016). Le train Birinik, la ligne Pont-l'Abbé - Saint-Guénolé. Editions Ressac.
- Serge Duigou (2021). Phares de Bretagne. Editions Jos.
- Serge Duigou, José Le Bescond, Alain-Gabriel Monot (2022), La Barbinasse, l'Île-Tudy renoue avec son passé maritime, Association La Barbinasse.
- Serge Duigou, Annick Fleitour, Jean-Yves Guillaume (2024), Pays bigouden, Au parapet du grand large, Géorama.
- Serge Duigou (2025), Locronan, Cité d'art et d'histoire, Editions Jos.

Contributions

Bretagne, les chevaux d'espoir, Autrement, 1979.

La terre des prêtres (introduction), Editions Le Signor, 1980.

Bretagne mode d'emploi (direction), Autrement, 1981.

L'Historiographe, Germain Lacasse (collaboration), Cinémathèque québécoise/Musée du cinéma, Montréal, 1985.

La Bretagne, une province à l'aube de la Révolution, Centre de recherche bretonne et celtique, Société archéologique du Finistère, 1989.

Le Pays bigouden à la croisée des chemins, Association de promotion du Pays Bigouden - Cap Sizun, Revue Cap Caval, Université de Bretagne Occidentale, 1993.

Images de Bretagne, Editions Jos, 1993.

Les Bretons au-delà des mers, Editions Le Progrès/Le Courrier, 1996.

Chrétientés de Basse-Bretagne et d'ailleurs, Société archéologique du Finistère, 1998.

Dictionnaire du patrimoine breton, Editions Apogée, 2001.

Histoires de Bretagne, l'histoire des Bretons, Le Télégramme, 2001.

Ces Bretons d'Amérique du Nord (preface), Ouest-France, 2005.

Conserveries en Bretagne, Coop Breizh, 2007.

Dictionnaire d'histoire de Bretagne, Skol Vreizh, 2008.

Quimper Cornouaille, années 1920/1930, Palantines, 2010.

Curiosités géologiques du Pays bigouden (preface), Editions Apogée, 2011.

Plogoff, une lutte au bout du monde, Locus Solus, 2021.

Pirn Bihan, Une vie de marin-pêcheur bigouden (preface), Ster Poulgwenn Editions, 2024.

Histoires extraordinaires de Bretagne, Editions Le Télégramme, 2024.

Une école du bout du monde, Histoire de l'école publique de Plovan (1831-1990) (preface), Association Patrimoine de Plovan, 2024.

Histoires extraordinaires de la mer, Editions Le Télégramme, 2026.
