= François Hippolyte Lalaisse =

French artist known for painting (1810–1884)

- Born: François Hippolyte Lalaisse; 27 January 1810; Nancy, France
- Died: 13 March 1884 (aged 74); Paris, France
- Known for: Pastel, watercolours, lithographs
- Movement: regional art
- Awards: Légion d'honneur - Chevalier (Knight)

François Hippolyte Lalaisse (27 January 1810 – 13 March 1884) was a French painter and illustrator.

== Life ==
François Hippolyte Lalaisse was born in Nancy on 27 January 1810. He was taught by Nicolas-Toussaint Charlet and later became a professor at the "École polytechnique (France)" teaching there from 1839 to 1877. Amongst his illustrations were those for Pierre Henri Charpentier's "Costumes et vues pittoresques de la Bretagne" published in 1848. These sketches are invaluable as records of the types of costumes and dress worn in various regions of Brittany.

Lalaisse was a regular exhibitor at the Paris Salon, his first venture there being in 1835. Apart from the large number of lithographs depicting the regional costumes worn in Brittany he also published lithographs depicting the military uniforms of the times. Several Lalaisse lithographs can be seen in the Musée du Faouët. His paintings can also be seen in the art museums of Bagnères-de-Bigorre, Chaumont and Lons-le-Saulnier as well as various costume sketches which are held in Marseille's Musée des Civilisations de l’Europe et de la Méditerranée.

Lalaisse died on 13 March 1884 in Paris.

== Gallery ==
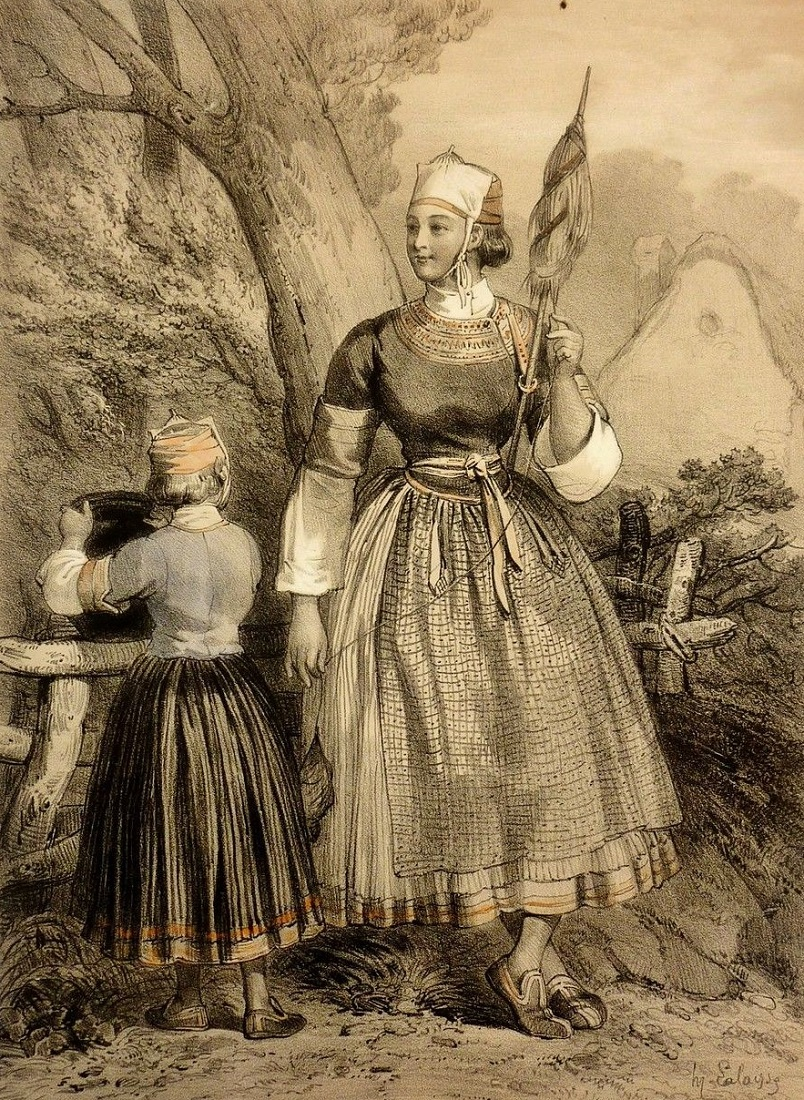
This lithograph depicting a woman from Pont-l'Abbé was shown at the "Galerie armoricaine" in 1848 and was included in "Costumes et vues pittoresques de la Bretagne" published in Nantes by Charpentier Père et Fils.

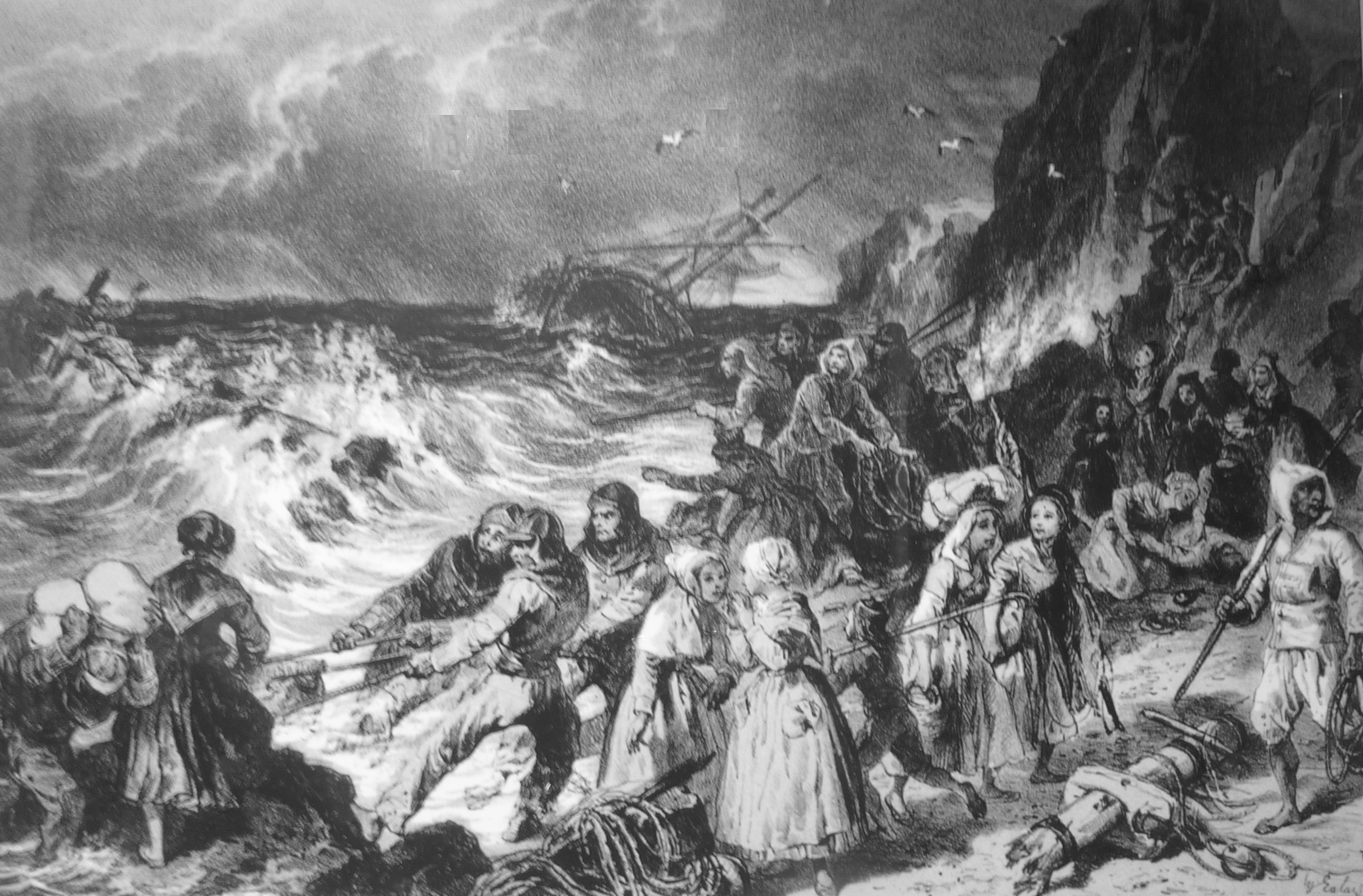
A Scene depicting a storm at sea in the Kerlouan, Quimper area. This work can be seen in the Musée départemental Breton.

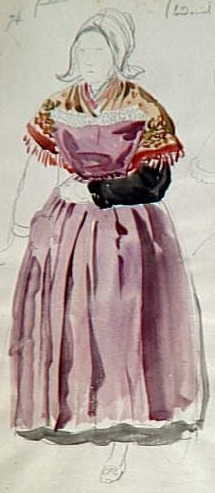
A study of the costume worn by a woman of Ploudaniel. This work can be seen in Marseille's Musée des civilisations de l'Europe et de la Méditerranée.

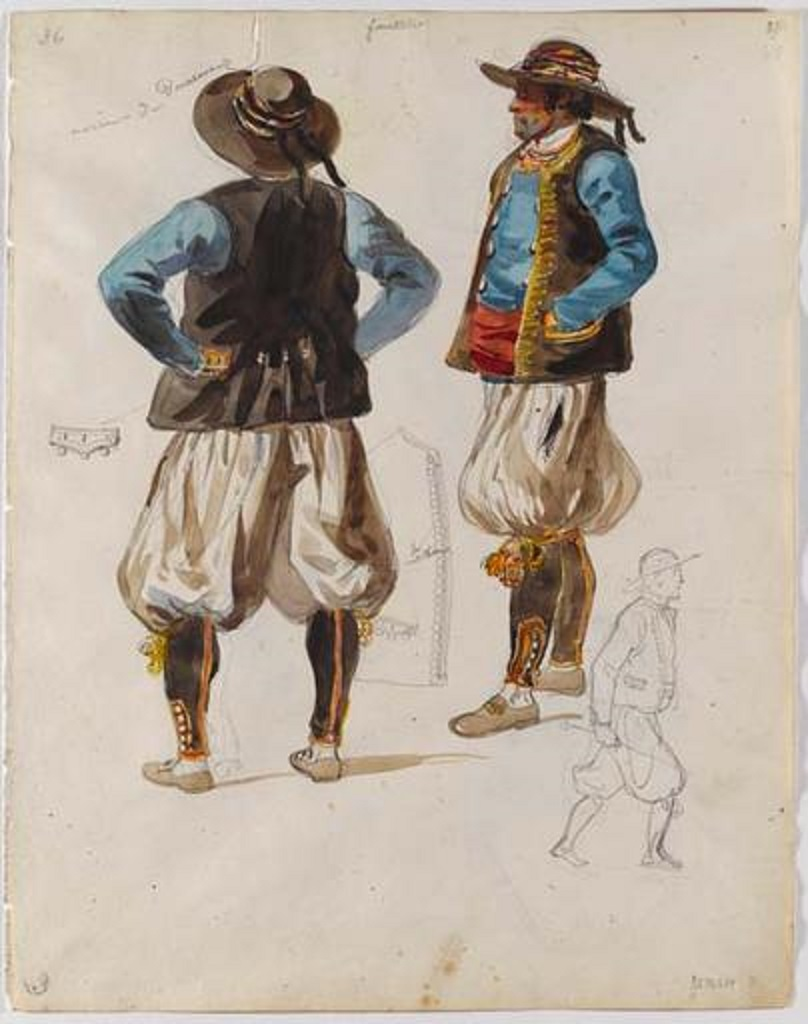
Study of the costume worn by a man of Douarnenez. This work of 1843 can be seen in Marseille's Musée des civilisations de l'Europe et de la Méditerranée.

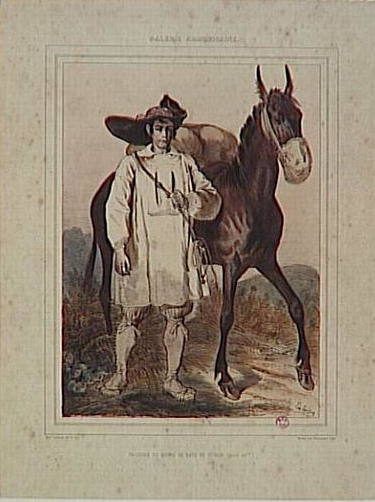
Study of a salt seller (paludier) from Batz. This work of 1845/1846 can be seen in Marseille's Musée des civilisations de l'Europe et de la Méditerranée.

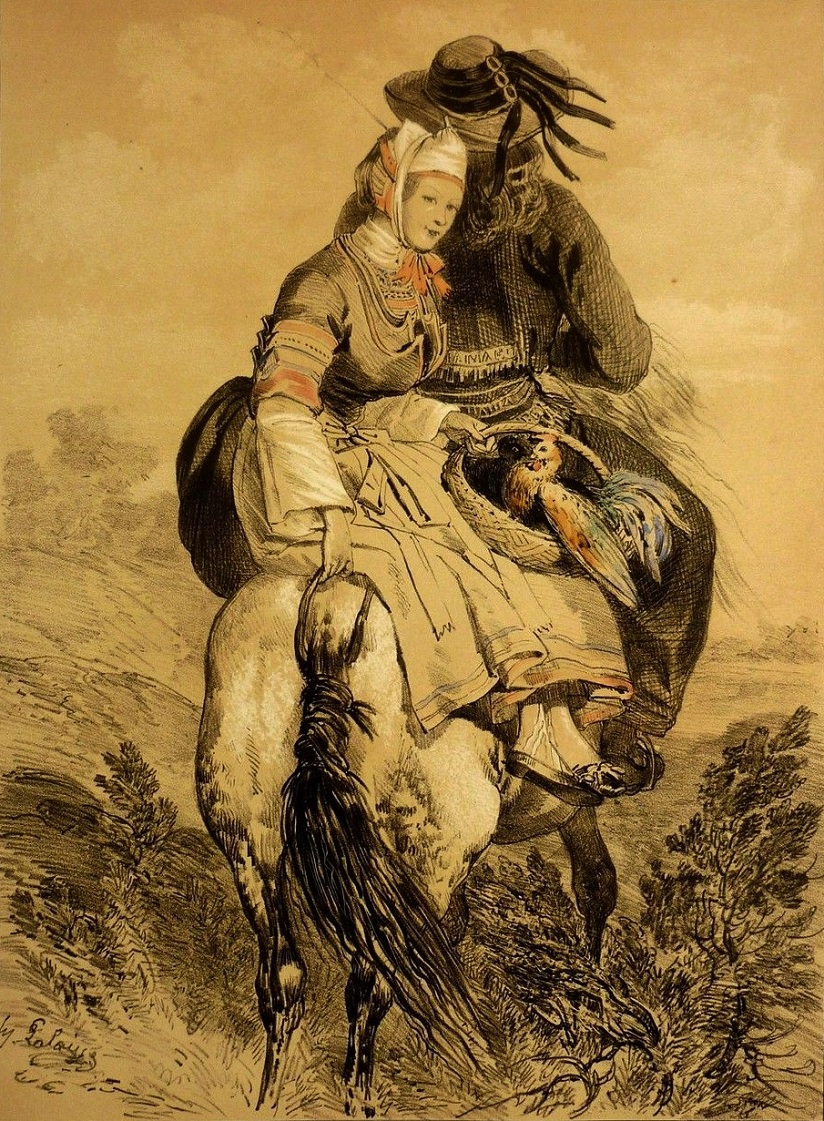
This study of a man and woman from Pont-l'Abbé appeared in the Galleria armoricaine in 1848
