= Georges A. L. Boisselier =

French painter

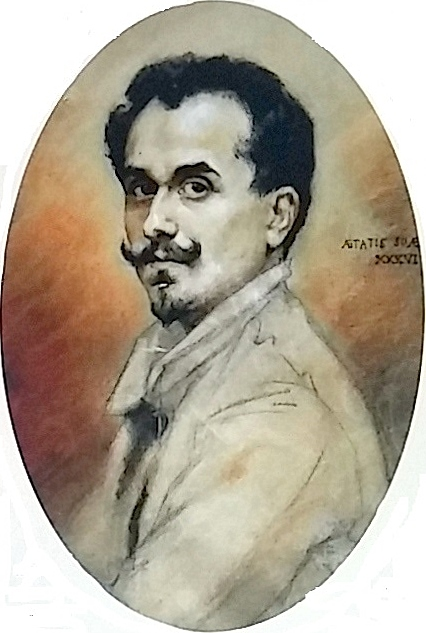
Self-portrait (1912)

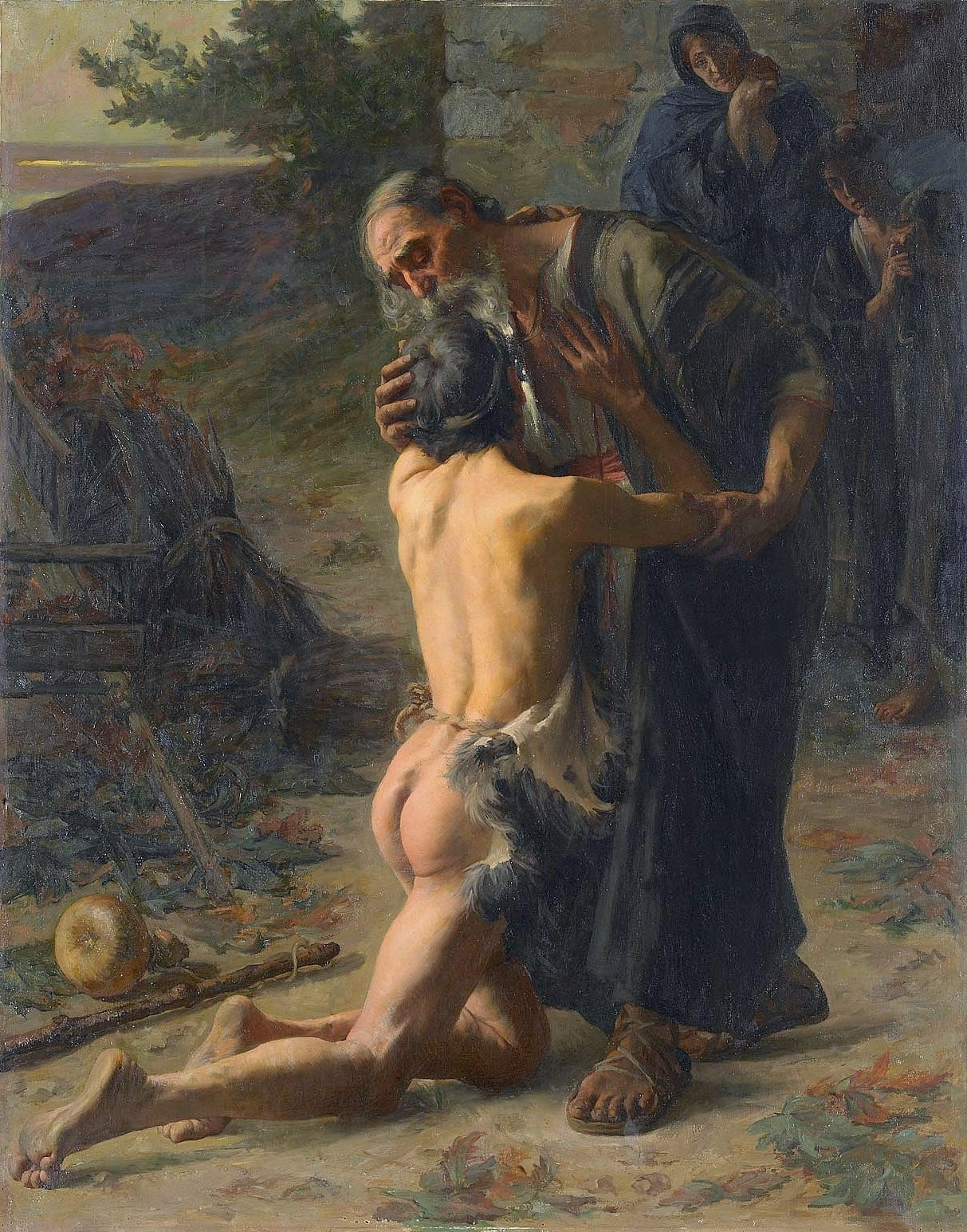
Return of the Prodigal Son

Georges Alexandre Lucien Boisselier (15 March 1876, Paris - 5 November 1943, Paris) was a French painter in the Academic style; known primarily for portraits and genre figures. He also designed furniture.

== Biography ==
His father, Louis Auguste Boisselier, was a designer. He displayed his artistic talents at an early age and entered the École des beaux-arts de Paris when he was only fourteen. There, he studied with Gabriel Ferrier and was awarded three medals. He then studied with William Bouguereau at the Académie Julian from 1892 to 1895, when he submitted his first entry to the Prix de Rome. He would participate several more times through 1904 and achieved second place in 1903 for his "Return of the Prodigal Son".

Although he began as a painter of historical scenes, he soon became a favored portraitist among the members of high society. His first exhibit at the Salon came in 1898 and he would continue to exhibit there regularly.

In 1911, he could afford a small home in Brittany; in the commune of Penmarch. In 1925, he built an adjoining villa with a studio, designed to imitate the local fishermen's houses. His desire to become part of the community was so great, that he learned to speak Breton. He was also interested in archaeology and helped to create the Musée de la Préhistoire finistérienne and served as its Curator from 1932 to 1939. He became a member of the Société préhistorique française in 1937.

In 1923, he was named a Chevalier in the Legion of Honor.

He died in 1943, at the Clinique Oudinot in Paris, where he had gone for treatment. He was never married and had no children.
