= Loctudy =

Loctudy Loktudi
- Commune
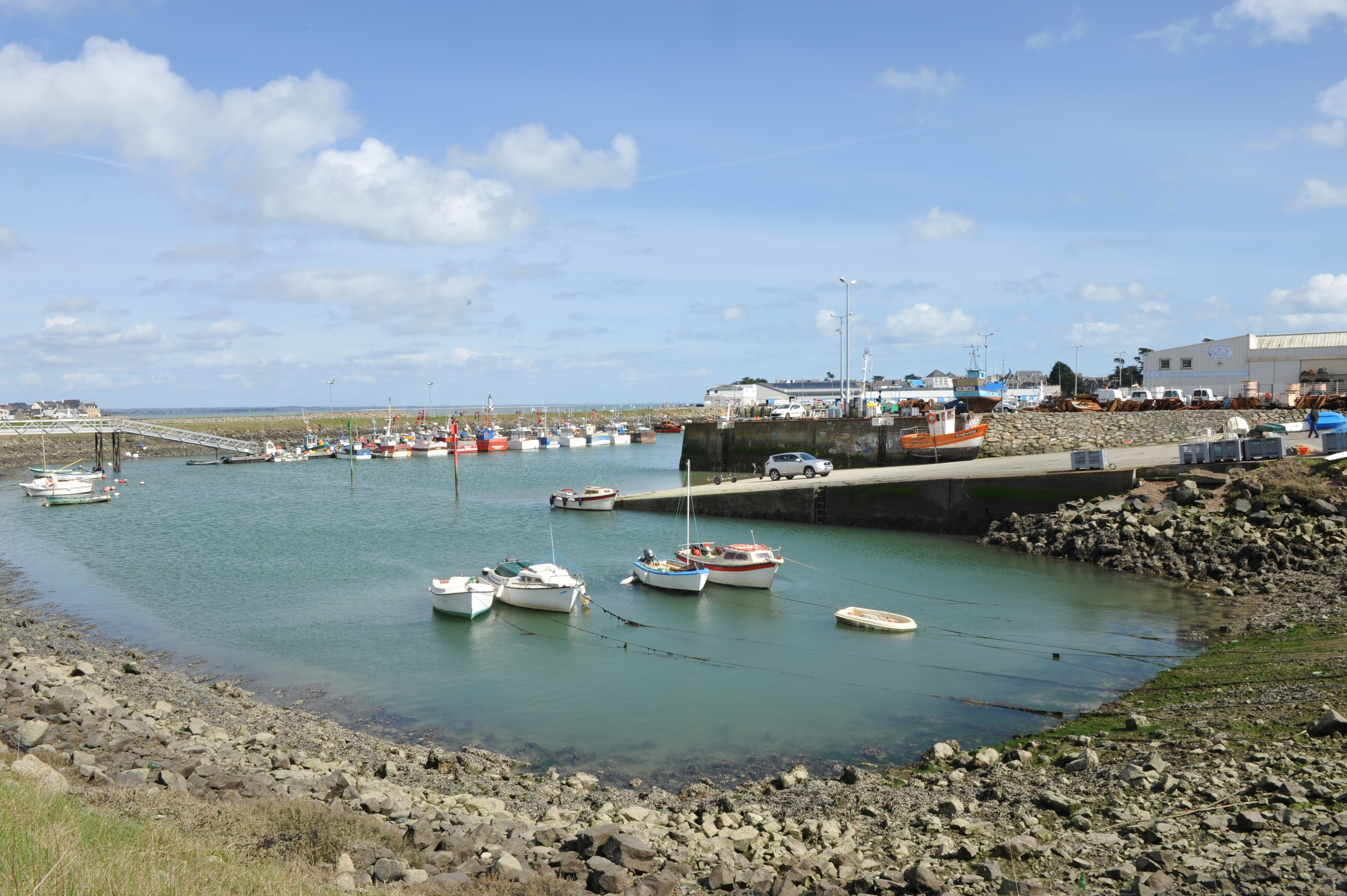
- The harbour at Loctudy

- Coat of arms
- Location of Loctudy
- Location within France Location within Brittany
- Coordinates: 47°50′04″N 4°10′05″W
- Country: France
- Region: Brittany
- Department: Finistère
- Arrondissement: Quimper
- Canton: Pont-l'Abbé
- Intercommunality: Pays Bigouden Sud

Government
  - Mayor (2023–2026): Serge Guilloux
- Area^{1}: 12.73 km^{2} (4.92 sq mi)
- Highest elevation: 17 m (56 ft)
- Lowest elevation: 0 m (0 ft)
- Population (2023): 4,075
  - Density: 320.1/km^{2} (829.1/sq mi)
- Time zone: UTC+01:00 (CET)
  - Summer (DST): UTC+02:00 (CEST)
- INSEE/Postal code: 29135 /29750
- ^{1} French Land Register data, which excludes lakes, ponds, glaciers > 1 km^{2} (0.386 sq mi or 247 acres) and river estuaries.

Loctudy (French pronunciation: [lɔktydi]; Breton: Loktudi) is a fishing port and seaside resort in Brittany, France, at the mouth of the Pont-l'Abbé river estuary.

The commune is in the Finistère department in northwestern France. Situated on the peninsula of Penmarc'h in the far southwestern part of Lower Brittany, it preserves elements of old Breton culture, and the Breton language is still in use.

The name means "place or hermitage of St Tudy". There is controversy concerning the identity of the saint: both Tudy of Landevennec and Tudwal have been suggested. The eleventh-century church is dedicated to St Tudy.

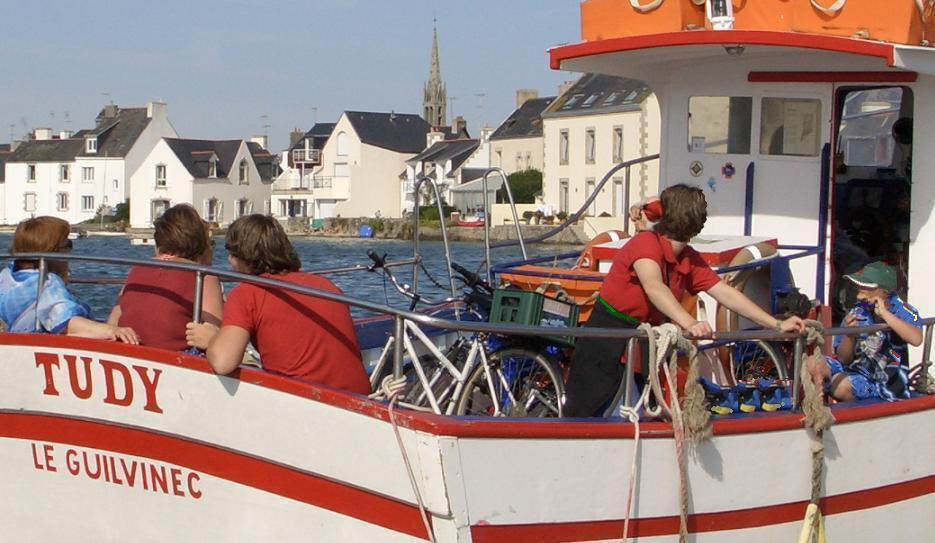

The port grew because of its sheltered position protected from the prevailing southwest winds. The fishing port is important (2004-6: around 7000 tonnes per annum landed), and specializes in langoustines, called "demoiselles de Loctudy". The four ports of the Penmarc'h peninsula (Guilvinec, Saint Guénolé Penmarc'h, Loctudy and Lesconil) land 40 000 tonnes per year and constitute the largest fishery in France. A marina was constructed in 1991 and had (2006) 661 moorings.

Loctudy is twinned with the towns of Fishguard in Pembrokeshire, Wales and Ribadeo in Galicia, Spain.

== Population ==
Inhabitants of Loctudy are called Loctudistes.

Historical population
| Year | Pop. | ±% p.a. |
|---|---|---|
| 1968 | 3,410 | — |
| 1975 | 3,544 | +0.55% |
| 1982 | 3,560 | +0.06% |
| 1990 | 3,622 | +0.22% |
| 1999 | 3,659 | +0.11% |
| 2007 | 4,101 | +1.44% |
| 2012 | 4,001 | −0.49% |
| 2017 | 4,073 | +0.36% |
| 2023 | 4,075 | +0.01% |
Source: INSEE

Irish cyclist, and yellow jersey holder of the three European Grand Tours, Shay Elliott, lived, and operated a hotel, here, for a period, with his Strasbourg-born wife, and son Pascal.

== See also ==
- Communes of the Finistère department
