= Breton costume =

Traditional clothing of the Breton peoples

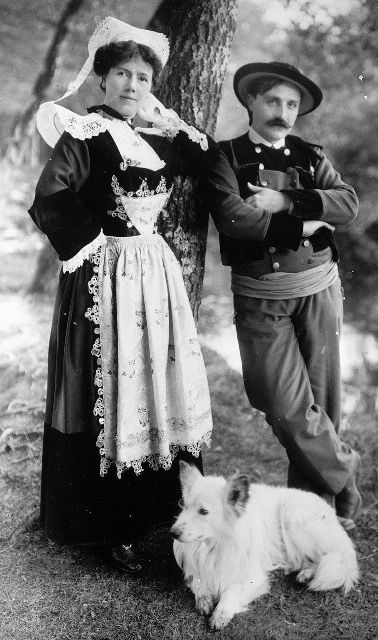
Traditional Breton costume around 1900

Breton costume is the style of clothing worn by the Bretons (people in Brittany, the Celtic region of France) as formal wear or festive clothing.

== Style ==
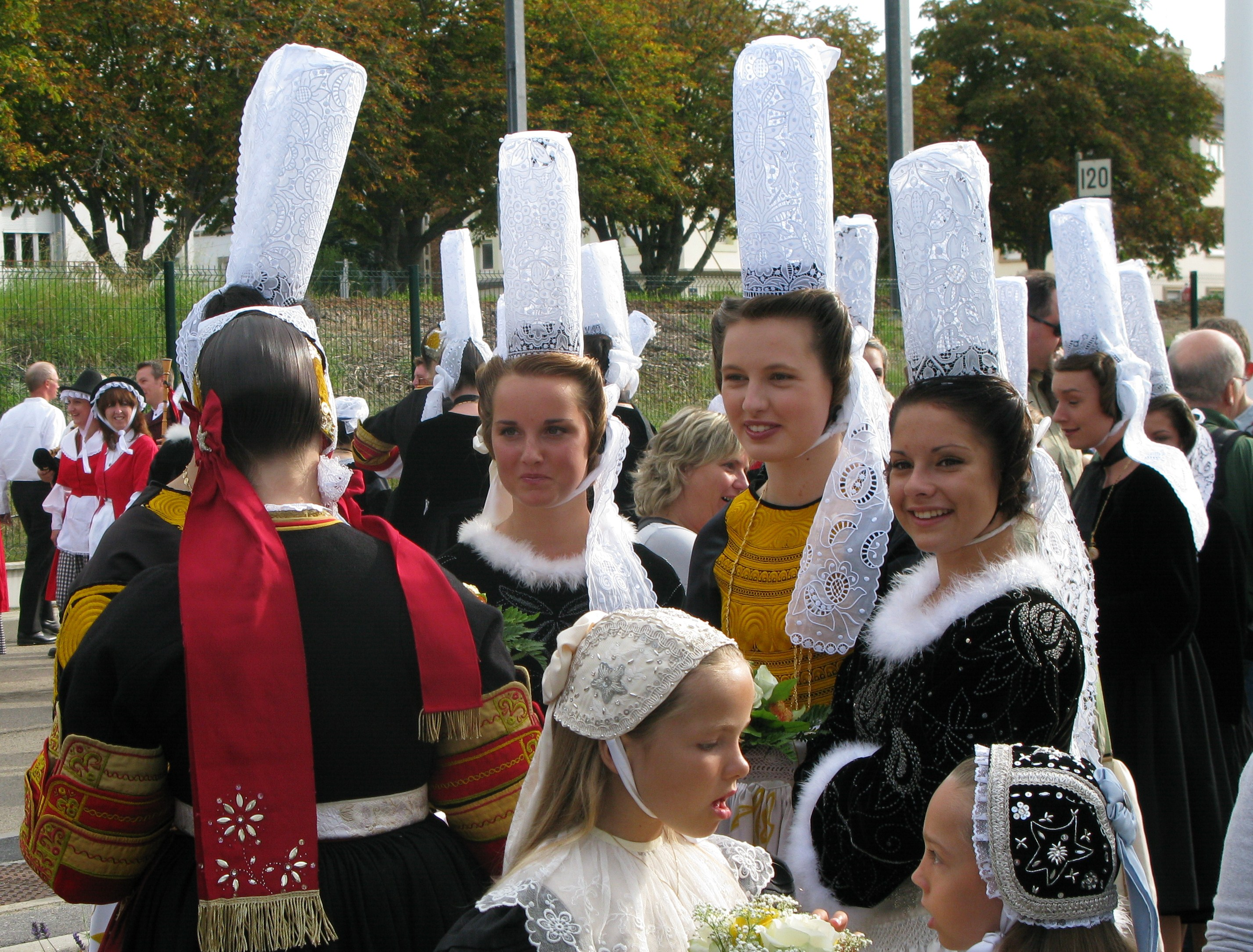
Breton women and girls wearing bigoudène headdresses during a festival

Everyday versions are less varied, although some are decorated according to profession or location. The women wear long dresses with white aprons, lace collars with lace headdresses. And men wear a white shirt with black trousers along with a close-fitting waistcoat. The distinctive Breton costume is deeply associated with their culture. In the early 20th century there were said to be nearly 800 different types of the Breton lace headdress.

Since the late twentieth century, the traditional dress is almost always worn during special religious events (pardons) and cultural events involving Celtic Circles; leading to the "Breton costume" becoming "folk costume" of the region.
