= Plobannalec-Lesconil =

Plobannalec-Lesconil Pornaleg-Leskonil
- Commune
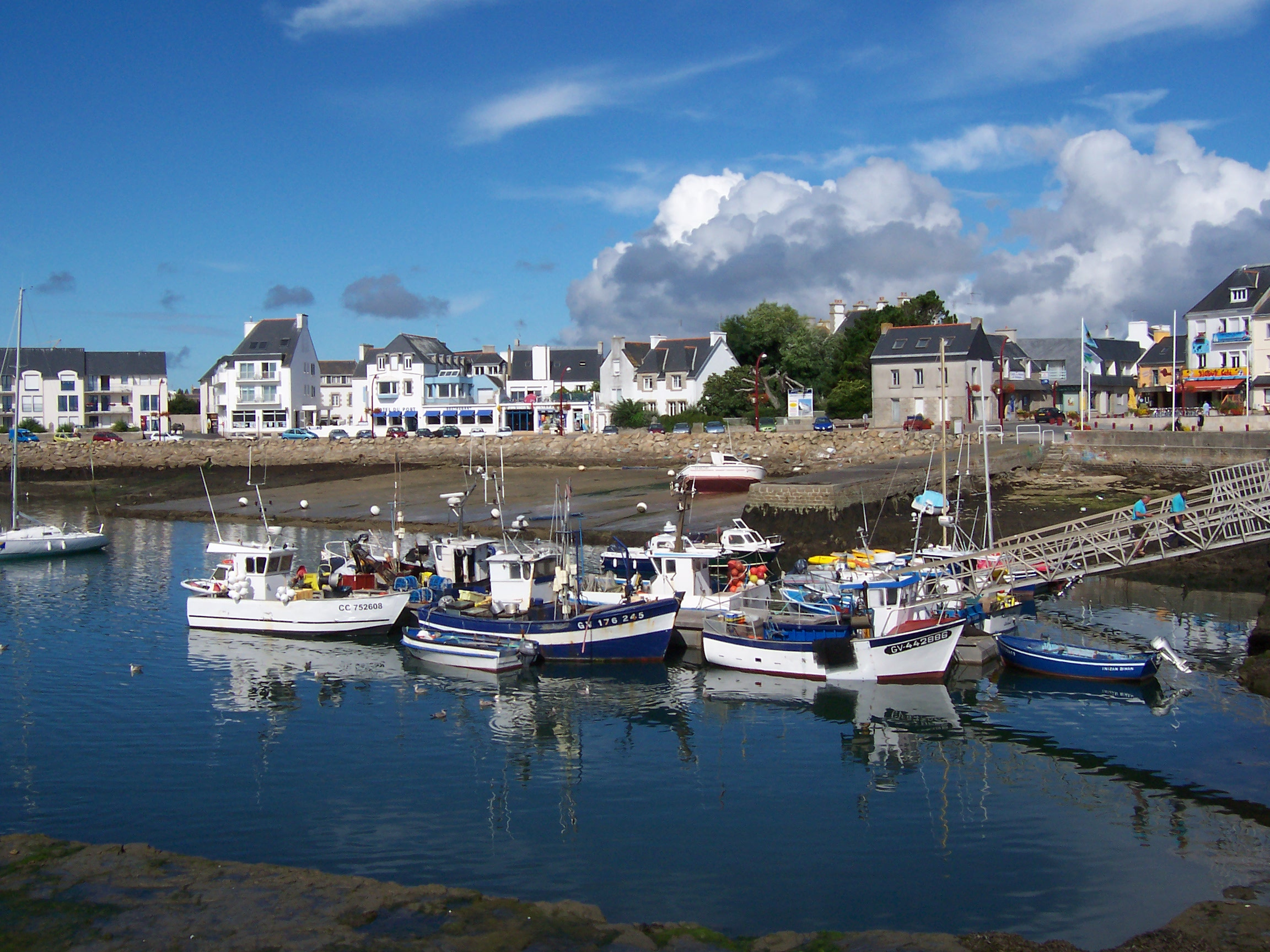
- Boats in Lesconil harbour, in 2005
- Location of Plobannalec-Lesconil
- Location within France Location within Brittany
- Coordinates: 47°49′27″N 4°13′43″W
- Country: France
- Region: Brittany
- Department: Finistère
- Arrondissement: Quimper
- Canton: Pont-l'Abbé
- Intercommunality: Pays Bigouden Sud

Government
  - Mayor (2020–2026): Cyrille Le Cleac'h
- Area^{1}: 18.17 km^{2} (7.02 sq mi)
- Highest elevation: 27 m (89 ft)
- Lowest elevation: 0 m (0 ft)
- Population (2023): 3,718
  - Density: 204.6/km^{2} (530.0/sq mi)
- Time zone: UTC+01:00 (CET)
  - Summer (DST): UTC+02:00 (CEST)
- INSEE/Postal code: 29165 /29740
- ^{1} French Land Register data, which excludes lakes, ponds, glaciers > 1 km^{2} (0.386 sq mi or 247 acres) and river estuaries.

Plobannalec-Lesconil (French pronunciation: [plɔbanalɛk lɛskɔnil]; Breton: Pornaleg-Leskonil, before 2001: Plobannalec) is a commune in the Finistère department of Brittany in north-western France.

== Population ==
Inhabitants of Plobannalec-Lesconil are called in French Lesconilois or Plobannalecois.

Historical population

Year	Pop.	±% p.a.
1793	1,518	—
1800	1,218	−3.10%
1806	1,285	+0.90%
1821	1,556	+1.28%
1831	1,531	−0.16%
1836	1,676	+1.83%
1841	1,728	+0.61%
1846	1,865	+1.54%
1851	1,880	+0.16%
1856	1,866	−0.15%
1861	1,910	+0.47%
1866	1,979	+0.71%
1872	2,011	+0.27%
1876	2,167	+1.89%
1881	2,208	+0.38%
1886	2,313	+0.93%
1891	2,289	−0.21%
1896	2,286	−0.03%
1901	2,565	+2.33%

Year	Pop.	±% p.a.
1906	2,716	+1.15%
1911	2,922	+1.47%
1921	2,832	−0.31%
1926	2,822	−0.07%
1931	2,910	+0.62%
1936	2,878	−0.22%
1946	2,784	−0.33%
1954	2,765	−0.09%
1962	2,916	+0.67%
1968	2,831	−0.49%
1975	2,835	+0.02%
1982	2,844	+0.05%
1990	3,022	+0.76%
1999	3,007	−0.06%
2007	3,315	+1.23%
2012	3,400	+0.51%
2017	3,474	+0.43%
2023	3,718	+1.14%

Source: EHESS and INSEE (1968-2023)

== See also ==
- Communes of the Finistère department
- Entry on sculptor of local war memorial Jean Joncourt
