= Penmarch =

Penmarch Penmarc'h
- Commune
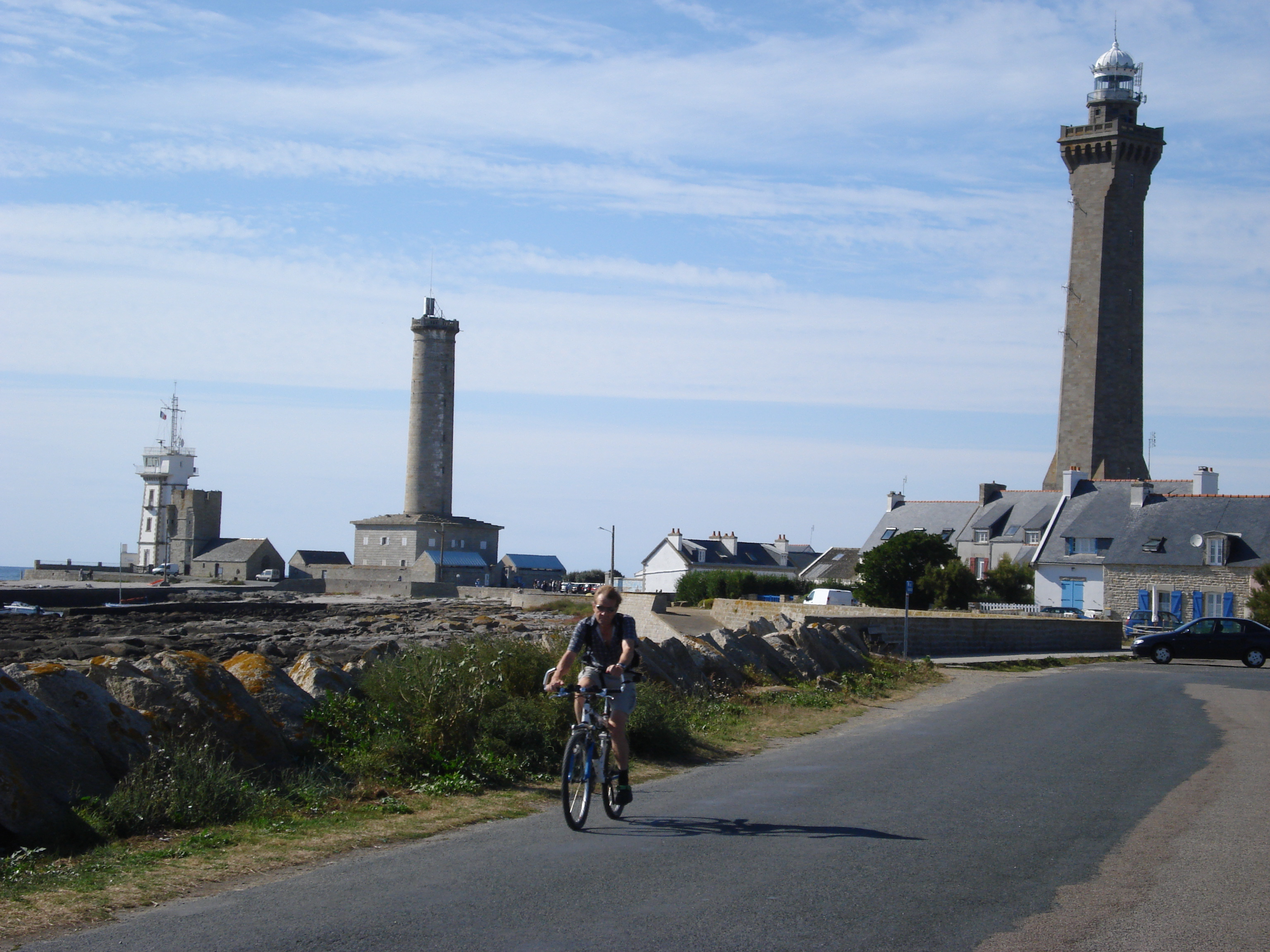
- Lighthouses on the Pointe de Penmarc'h

- Coat of arms
- Location of Penmarch
- Location within France Location within Brittany
- Coordinates: 47°48′46″N 4°20′12″W
- Country: France
- Region: Brittany
- Department: Finistère
- Arrondissement: Quimper
- Canton: Pont-l'Abbé
- Intercommunality: Pays Bigouden Sud

Government
  - Mayor (2020–2026): Gwenola Le Troadec
- Area^{1}: 16.39 km^{2} (6.33 sq mi)
- Highest elevation: 23 m (75 ft)
- Lowest elevation: −1 m (−3.3 ft)
- Population (2023): 5,508
  - Density: 336.1/km^{2} (870.4/sq mi)
- Time zone: UTC+01:00 (CET)
  - Summer (DST): UTC+02:00 (CEST)
- INSEE/Postal code: 29158 /29760
- ^{1} French Land Register data, which excludes lakes, ponds, glaciers > 1 km^{2} (0.386 sq mi or 247 acres) and river estuaries.

Penmarch (French pronunciation: [pɛ̃maʁ], Breton: Penmarc'h) is a commune in the Finistère department of Brittany, northwestern France. It lies 18 km south-west of Quimper by road.

== Geography ==
Penmarch is the southwest-most township of Pays Bigouden, at the southern end of the Bay of Audierne. It is part of the canton of Pont-l'Abbé, and of the arrondissement of Quimper.

The territory of the town (16.39 km^{2}) is particularly flat; its altitude ranges from -1 to 23 m amsl. There are many marshy lagoons, some of which have been drained and filled, especially in St. Guénolé to save space or habitat for the installation of local handicrafts.

The municipality consists of four villages:

- Penmarch-Bourg, formerly known as the Tréoultré;
- Saint-Guénolé (main fishing port);
- Kerity (fishing port side moving towards the hosting of the craft);
- Saint-Pierre (port for very small craft).

Many islands or reefs of very variable dimensions punctuate the coast of Penmarch; the most important are the Étocs islets south of Kerity, and the island of Saint-Nonna west of Saint-Pierre.

The port of Saint-Guénolé has a pass opening due west, thought to be dangerous in rough weather. It is protected by two granite peninsulas: Krugen in the South, and Conq in the northwest. Krugen is connected to the mainland by a sandy isthmus. Conq is connected to the shore by an artificial embankment itself protected by concrete blocks to better break the flood wave.

The rocky granite coast (called "savage coast" in Saint-Guénolé) is interspersed with several beaches:

- North, the beach of Pors Carn-which extends to the tip of the torch (joint Plomeur);
- West, the beach of Joy;
- South, the beach Steir Kerity which begins at and continues through Guilvinec.

=== Climate ===
Penmarch has a climate bordering between Mediterranean (Köppen Csb) and oceanic (Cfb). It is heavily moderated by the Atlantic Ocean and the Gulf Stream influence, resulting in cool summers and very mild winters for the latitude as seasonal differences are low.

Climate data for Penmarch (1981–2010 normals; extremes 1973–2017)
Month	Jan	Feb	Mar	Apr	May	Jun	Jul	Aug	Sep	Oct	Nov	Dec	Year
Record high °C (°F)	14.4 (57.9)	14.6 (58.3)	23.7 (74.7)	25.8 (78.4)	28.3 (82.9)	33.0 (91.4)	31.1 (88.0)	32.7 (90.9)	30.5 (86.9)	22.6 (72.7)	20.0 (68.0)	16.0 (60.8)	33.0 (91.4)
Mean daily maximum °C (°F)	10.1 (50.2)	9.9 (49.8)	11.4 (52.5)	13.3 (55.9)	16.6 (61.9)	18.4 (65.1)	19.7 (67.5)	20.1 (68.2)	18.8 (65.8)	16.0 (60.8)	13.1 (55.6)	10.9 (51.6)	14.8 (58.6)
Daily mean °C (°F)	8.2 (46.8)	7.8 (46.0)	9.3 (48.7)	10.8 (51.4)	13.5 (56.3)	15.8 (60.4)	17.4 (63.3)	17.7 (63.9)	16.3 (61.3)	14.0 (57.2)	11.1 (52.0)	8.9 (48.0)	12.6 (54.7)
Mean daily minimum °C (°F)	6.4 (43.5)	5.6 (42.1)	7.1 (44.8)	8.2 (46.8)	11.0 (51.8)	13.3 (55.9)	15.1 (59.2)	15.2 (59.4)	13.8 (56.8)	11.9 (53.4)	9.1 (48.4)	6.9 (44.4)	10.3 (50.5)
Record low °C (°F)	−9.3 (15.3)	−6.8 (19.8)	−2.0 (28.4)	0.4 (32.7)	2.0 (35.6)	6.0 (42.8)	8.8 (47.8)	8.3 (46.9)	6.7 (44.1)	−0.2 (31.6)	−3.0 (26.6)	−6.3 (20.7)	−9.3 (15.3)
Average precipitation mm (inches)	74.9 (2.95)	59.6 (2.35)	53.9 (2.12)	47.8 (1.88)	46.8 (1.84)	29.0 (1.14)	31.2 (1.23)	29.6 (1.17)	43.5 (1.71)	72.3 (2.85)	67.0 (2.64)	77.5 (3.05)	633.1 (24.93)
Average precipitation days	13.7	10.3	11.1	10.0	9.2	5.7	5.8	6.1	7.4	11.8	12.4	12.7	116.1
Source 1: Météo Climat
Source 2: Météo Climat

== History ==
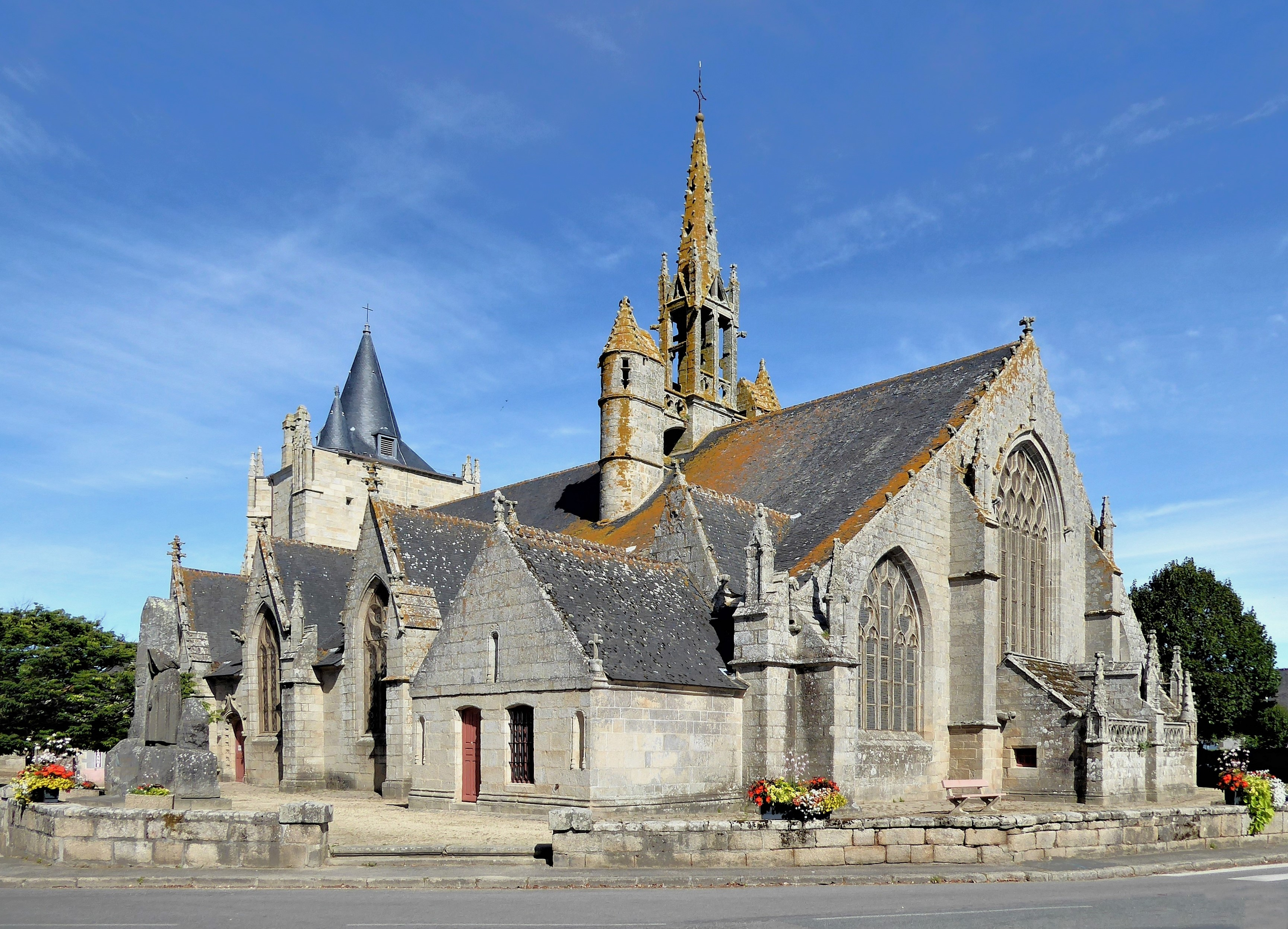
St Nonna's Church, Penmarch

On the extremity of the peninsula on which Penmarc'h is situated are the fortified remains of a town which was of considerable importance from the 14th to the 16th centuries and included, besides Penmarc'h, Saint-Guénolé and Kerity. It owed its prosperity to its cod banks, the disappearance of which together with the discovery of the Newfoundland cod banks and the pillage of the place by the bandit La Fontenelle in 1595, contributed to its decline.

The church of Saint Nouna, a Gothic building of the early 16th century at Penmarc'h, and the church of St. Guénolé, an unfinished tower, and the church of Kerity are of interest. The coast is known to be very dangerous for sailors. On the Pointe de Penmarc'h stands the Phare d'Eckmühl, with a light visible for 100 km (60 mi). There are numerous megalithic monuments in the vicinity.

== Population ==
Inhabitants of Penmarch are called in French Penmarchais.

Historical population

Year	Pop.	±% p.a.
1793	1,134	—
1800	1,166	+0.40%
1806	885	−4.49%
1821	1,462	+3.40%
1831	1,727	+1.68%
1836	1,781	+0.62%
1841	1,783	+0.02%
1846	1,867	+0.92%
1851	1,964	+1.02%
1856	1,987	+0.23%
1861	2,029	+0.42%
1866	2,227	+1.88%
1872	2,431	+1.47%
1876	2,641	+2.09%
1881	2,871	+1.68%
1886	3,238	+2.44%
1891	3,600	+2.14%
1896	4,298	+3.61%
1901	5,068	+3.35%

Year	Pop.	±% p.a.
1906	5,702	+2.39%
1911	6,051	+1.20%
1921	6,735	+1.08%
1926	6,877	+0.42%
1931	7,037	+0.46%
1936	6,956	−0.23%
1946	7,077	+0.17%
1954	7,204	+0.22%
1962	7,652	+0.76%
1968	7,320	−0.74%
1975	6,921	−0.80%
1982	6,463	−0.97%
1990	6,272	−0.37%
1999	5,889	−0.70%
2007	5,662	−0.49%
2012	5,532	−0.46%
2017	5,247	−1.05%
2023	5,508	+0.81%

Source: EHESS and INSEE (1968-2023)

== Sights ==
Penmarch is home to the 'Droguen' rock.

== Literary references ==
Dorigen, the female protagonist in Geoffrey Chaucer's The Franklin's Tale, has a name similar to the local rock, which may symbolise her obduracy..

== See also ==
- Communes of the Finistère department
- The Penmarch monument aux morts has sculpture by Pierre Charles Lenoir
- The Penmarch serves as a landing point for SEA-ME-WE 3, the longest submarine cable on Earth
