= Treffiagat =

Treffiagat Triagad
- Commune
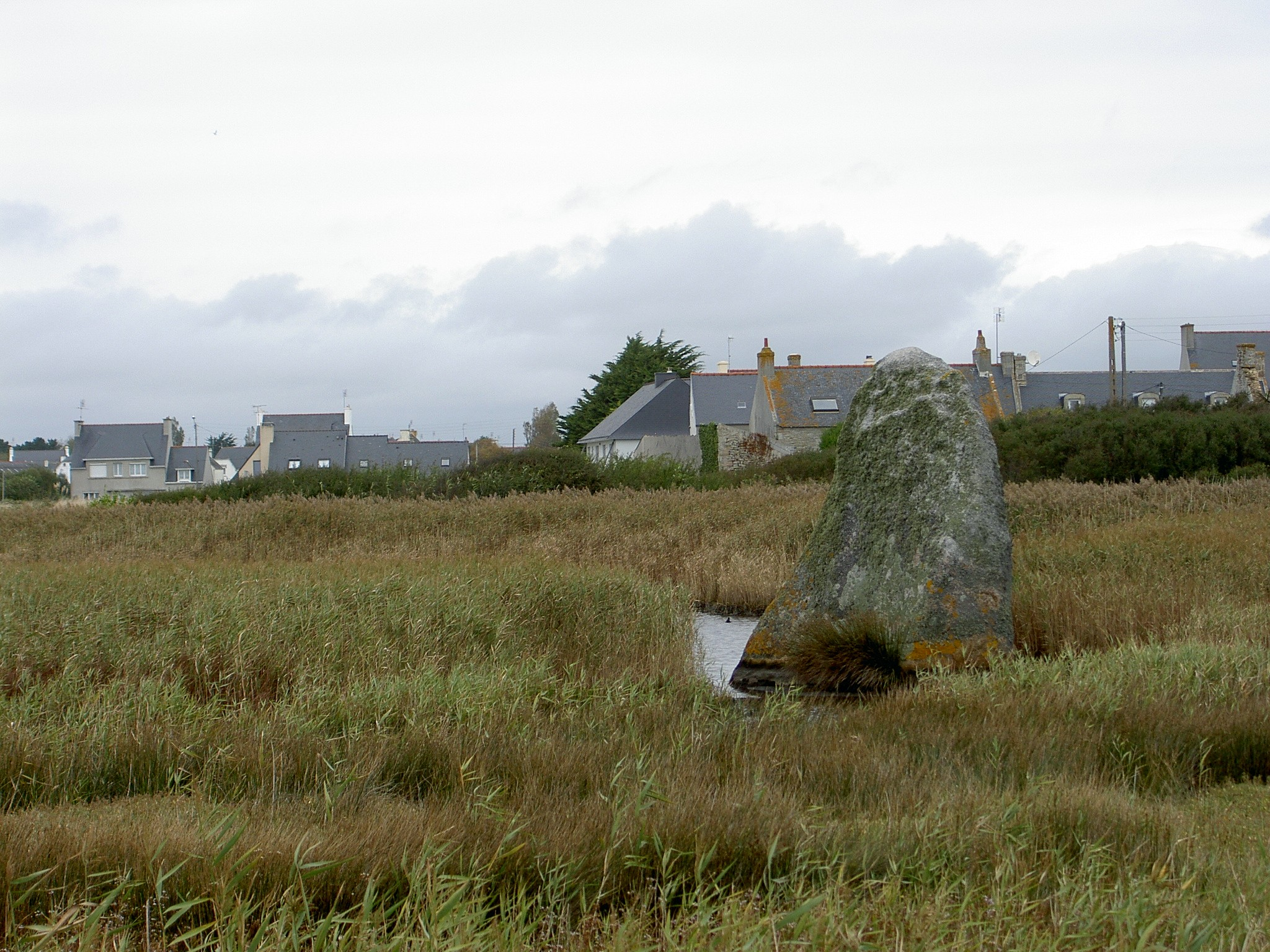
- Ancient menhir at Treffiagat
- Location of Treffiagat
- Location within France Location within Brittany
- Coordinates: 47°48′16″N 4°15′43″W
- Country: France
- Region: Brittany
- Department: Finistère
- Arrondissement: Quimper
- Canton: Pont-l'Abbé
- Intercommunality: Pays Bigouden Sud

Government
  - Mayor (2020–2026): Nathalie Carrot-Tanneau
- Area^{1}: 8.10 km^{2} (3.13 sq mi)
- Highest elevation: 26 m (85 ft)
- Lowest elevation: −1 m (−3.3 ft)
- Population (2023): 2,429
  - Density: 300/km^{2} (777/sq mi)
- Time zone: UTC+01:00 (CET)
  - Summer (DST): UTC+02:00 (CEST)
- INSEE/Postal code: 29284 /29730
- ^{1} French Land Register data, which excludes lakes, ponds, glaciers > 1 km^{2} (0.386 sq mi or 247 acres) and river estuaries.

Treffiagat (French pronunciation: [tʁefjaɡat]; Breton: Triagad), also known as Treffiagat-Léchiagat, is a commune in the Finistère department of Brittany in north-western France.

== Population ==
Inhabitants of Treffiagat are called in French Treffiagatistes.

Historical population
Year	Pop.	±% p.a.
1968	2,449	—
1975	2,484	+0.20%
1982	2,360	−0.73%
1990	2,333	−0.14%
1999	2,168	−0.81%
2007	2,274	+0.60%
2012	2,408	+1.15%
2017	2,399	−0.07%
2023	2,429	+0.21%
Source: INSEE

== See also ==
- Communes of the Finistère department
