= Pont-l'Abbé =

Pont-l'Abbé Pont-'n-Abad
- Commune
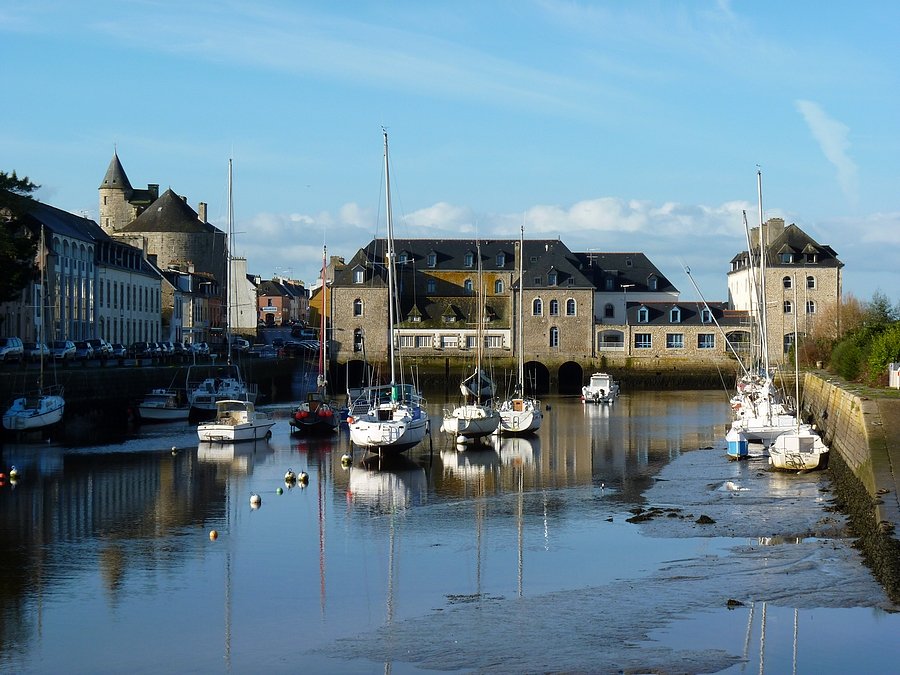
- The harbour of Pont-l'Abbé

- Flag Coat of arms
- Motto: Heb Ken
- Location of Pont-l'Abbé
- Location within France Location within Brittany
- Coordinates: 47°52′05″N 4°13′19″W
- Country: France
- Region: Brittany
- Department: Finistère
- Arrondissement: Quimper
- Canton: Pont-l'Abbé
- Intercommunality: Pays Bigouden Sud

Government
  - Mayor (2020–2026): Stéphane Le Doaré
- Area^{1}: 18.21 km^{2} (7.03 sq mi)
- Highest elevation: 37 m (121 ft)
- Lowest elevation: 0 m (0 ft)
- Population (2023): 8,484
  - Density: 465.9/km^{2} (1,207/sq mi)
- Time zone: UTC+01:00 (CET)
  - Summer (DST): UTC+02:00 (CEST)
- INSEE/Postal code: 29220 /29120
- ^{1} French Land Register data, which excludes lakes, ponds, glaciers > 1 km^{2} (0.386 sq mi or 247 acres) and river estuaries.

Pont-l'Abbé (French pronunciation: [pɔ̃ labe]; Breton: Pont-'n-Abad, "Abbot's bridge") is a commune in the Finistère department of Brittany in north-western France.

The self-styled capital of Pays Bigouden (roughly the region between the river Odet and the Bay of Audierne), Pont-l'Abbé was founded in the 14th century by a monk of Loctudy who built the first bridge across the river estuary, hence the name. The same monk also built the first castle.

== Geography ==
=== Climate ===
Pont-l'Abbé has an oceanic climate (Köppen climate classification Cfb). The average annual temperature in Pont-l'Abbé is 12.8 °C (55.0 °F). The average annual rainfall is 993.3 mm (39.11 in) with November as the wettest month. The temperatures are highest on average in August, at around 18.7 °C (65.7 °F), and lowest in January, at around 7.5 °C (45.5 °F). The highest temperature ever recorded in Pont-l'Abbé was 37.1 °C (98.8 °F) on 16 July 2006; the coldest temperature ever recorded was −10.8 °C (12.6 °F) on 2 January 1997.

Climate data for Pont-l'Abbé (1981–2010 averages, extremes 1994−2020)
Month	Jan	Feb	Mar	Apr	May	Jun	Jul	Aug	Sep	Oct	Nov	Dec	Year
Record high °C (°F)	16.7 (62.1)	18.6 (65.5)	22.5 (72.5)	28.0 (82.4)	31.4 (88.5)	35.4 (95.7)	37.1 (98.8)	36.6 (97.9)	32.3 (90.1)	28.1 (82.6)	21.5 (70.7)	19.1 (66.4)	37.1 (98.8)
Mean daily maximum °C (°F)	10.9 (51.6)	11.8 (53.2)	13.8 (56.8)	16.1 (61.0)	19.3 (66.7)	22.2 (72.0)	23.4 (74.1)	24.1 (75.4)	21.9 (71.4)	18.1 (64.6)	14.2 (57.6)	11.2 (52.2)	17.3 (63.1)
Daily mean °C (°F)	7.5 (45.5)	8.0 (46.4)	9.4 (48.9)	11.2 (52.2)	14.3 (57.7)	17.0 (62.6)	18.5 (65.3)	18.7 (65.7)	16.6 (61.9)	14.0 (57.2)	10.5 (50.9)	7.8 (46.0)	12.8 (55.0)
Mean daily minimum °C (°F)	4.1 (39.4)	4.2 (39.6)	5.0 (41.0)	6.2 (43.2)	9.4 (48.9)	11.8 (53.2)	13.5 (56.3)	13.3 (55.9)	11.3 (52.3)	10.0 (50.0)	6.8 (44.2)	4.4 (39.9)	8.4 (47.1)
Record low °C (°F)	−10.8 (12.6)	−6.6 (20.1)	−7.0 (19.4)	−1.6 (29.1)	0.3 (32.5)	4.1 (39.4)	6.5 (43.7)	6.1 (43.0)	3.2 (37.8)	−1.6 (29.1)	−3.7 (25.3)	−7.7 (18.1)	−10.8 (12.6)
Average precipitation mm (inches)	114.8 (4.52)	92.7 (3.65)	72.4 (2.85)	78.1 (3.07)	69.3 (2.73)	43.3 (1.70)	53.1 (2.09)	59.1 (2.33)	62.3 (2.45)	103.4 (4.07)	126.2 (4.97)	118.6 (4.67)	993.3 (39.11)
Average precipitation days (≥ 1.0 mm)	14.8	12.1	11.9	11.2	9.9	6.8	9.4	8.2	8.7	14.0	16.4	15.5	138.9
Source: Meteociel

== Population ==
Inhabitants of Pont-l'Abbé are called in French Pont-l'Abbistes.

Historical population

Year	Pop.	±% p.a.
1793	1,698	—
1800	1,884	+1.50%
1806	1,883	−0.01%
1821	2,115	+0.78%
1831	2,785	+2.79%
1836	3,163	+2.58%
1841	3,325	+1.00%
1846	3,626	+1.75%
1851	3,810	+0.99%
1856	3,947	+0.71%
1861	4,286	+1.66%
1866	4,526	+1.10%
1872	4,739	+0.77%
1876	4,991	+1.30%
1881	5,110	+0.47%
1886	5,729	+2.31%
1891	5,536	−0.68%
1896	5,797	+0.93%
1901	6,315	+1.73%

Year	Pop.	±% p.a.
1906	6,432	+0.37%
1911	6,652	+0.67%
1921	6,637	−0.02%
1926	6,724	+0.26%
1931	6,656	−0.20%
1936	6,563	−0.28%
1946	6,644	+0.12%
1954	6,393	−0.48%
1962	6,396	+0.01%
1968	6,791	+1.00%
1975	7,325	+1.09%
1982	7,266	−0.12%
1990	7,374	+0.18%
1999	7,849	+0.70%
2007	8,093	+0.38%
2012	8,374	+0.68%
2017	8,250	−0.30%
2023	8,484	+0.47%

Source: EHESS and INSEE (1968-2023)

== Breton language ==
The municipality launched a linguistic plan concerning the Breton language through Ya d'ar brezhoneg on 2 February 2008.

In 2008, 5.08% of primary-school children attended bilingual schools.

The Fête des Brodeuses (Embroideress' Festival) in July is one of Brittany's major traditional gatherings, and includes a Breton Mass at the Notre-Dame des Carmes church.

== Sights ==
- Pont-l'Abbé castle dates from the 14th to the 18th centuries. The "wedding" room is decorated with Mathurin Méheut pieces of art (Sainte-Marine port), Henri Sollier and Jacques Godin. Once bigger, the castle lost its ramparts during the 19th century. Today only the bridge, the keep, and a very small part of the ramparts, in the garden nearby, can be seen. The structure now serves as the city hall, housing also the Bigouden Museum, offering a fine collection of costumes and Bigouden head-dresses,
- Church of Notre-Dame des Carmes dates from 1383-1420 in the Gothic style, with many old statues and a very fine rose window over the high altar that is considered the loveliest in Brittany.
- Church of Lambour (13th-16th century) had its roof removed in 1675 in the reign of Louis XIV in reprisal against the "Red Bonnets" uprising.
- The Monument aux Bigoudens is a masterpiece in granite by François Bazin (1931) and shows a group of four Bigoudène women and a child in traditional costume from the beginning of the 20th century, all of them thinking of a son, a father, a husband or a grandson battling the elements on the high seas.
- The Manoir de Kernuz was restored c. 1850 by the historian of Brittany, Armand du Chatellier.
- The Manoir de Kerazan located between Pont-l'Abbé and Loktudi delivers a fine art of Architecture.
- The Chapel of Treminoù (the missings in Breton) on the road to St-Jean-Trolimon, celebrates the memory of the Breton insurgents slaughtered by the French army of Louis XIV. In particular, A gathering in the last week of September and a funfair festival in the City recalls this period of Brittany's history.
- A few Menhirs still island upright around the city.
- Down to the river by the sea, lies a ria, having given its name to Loktudi (Loch Tudi, the lagoon of Saint Tudi) and Isle Tudi, which shares some beautiful sights.
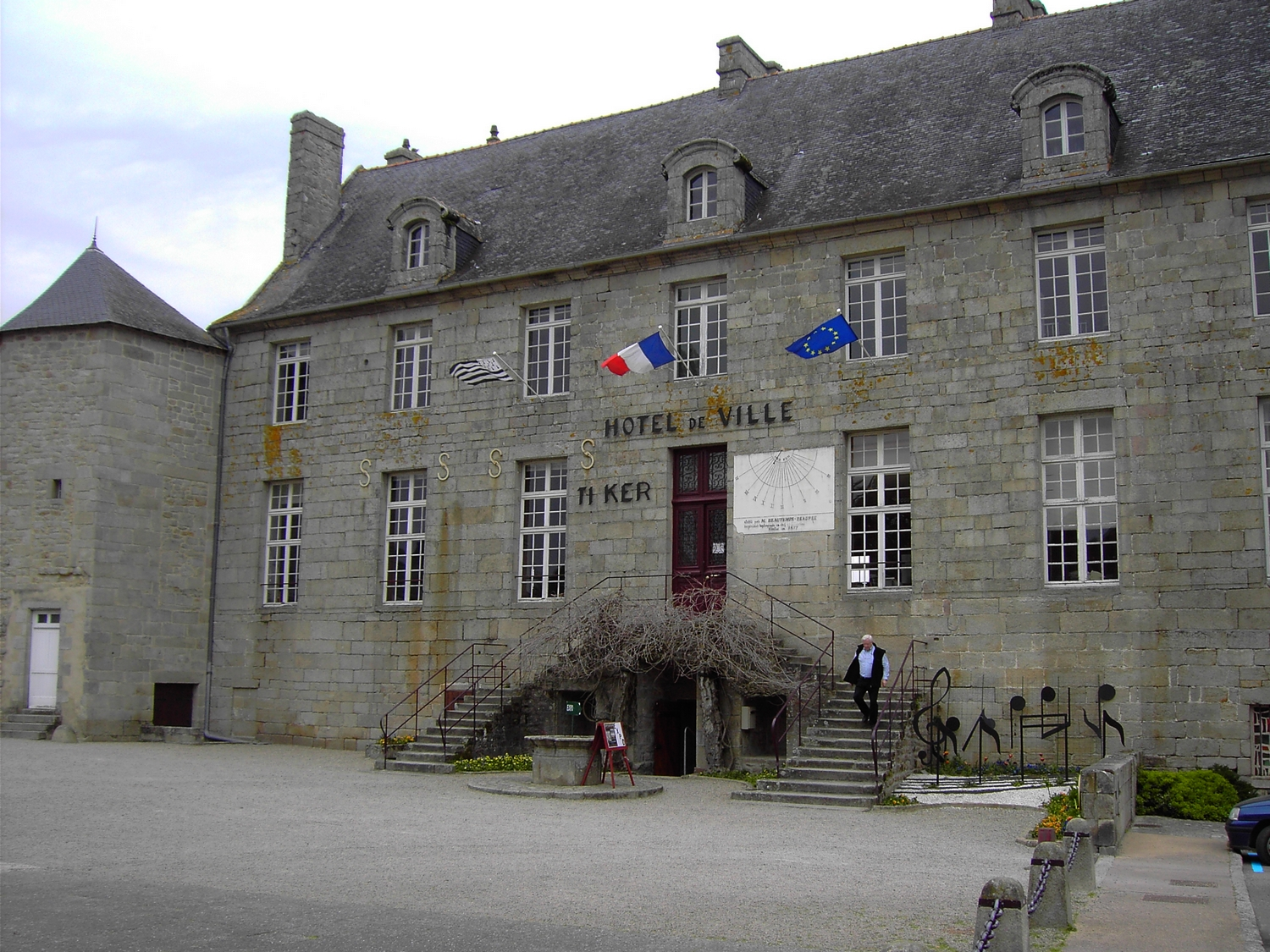
Present view of the Castle's keep, south view.

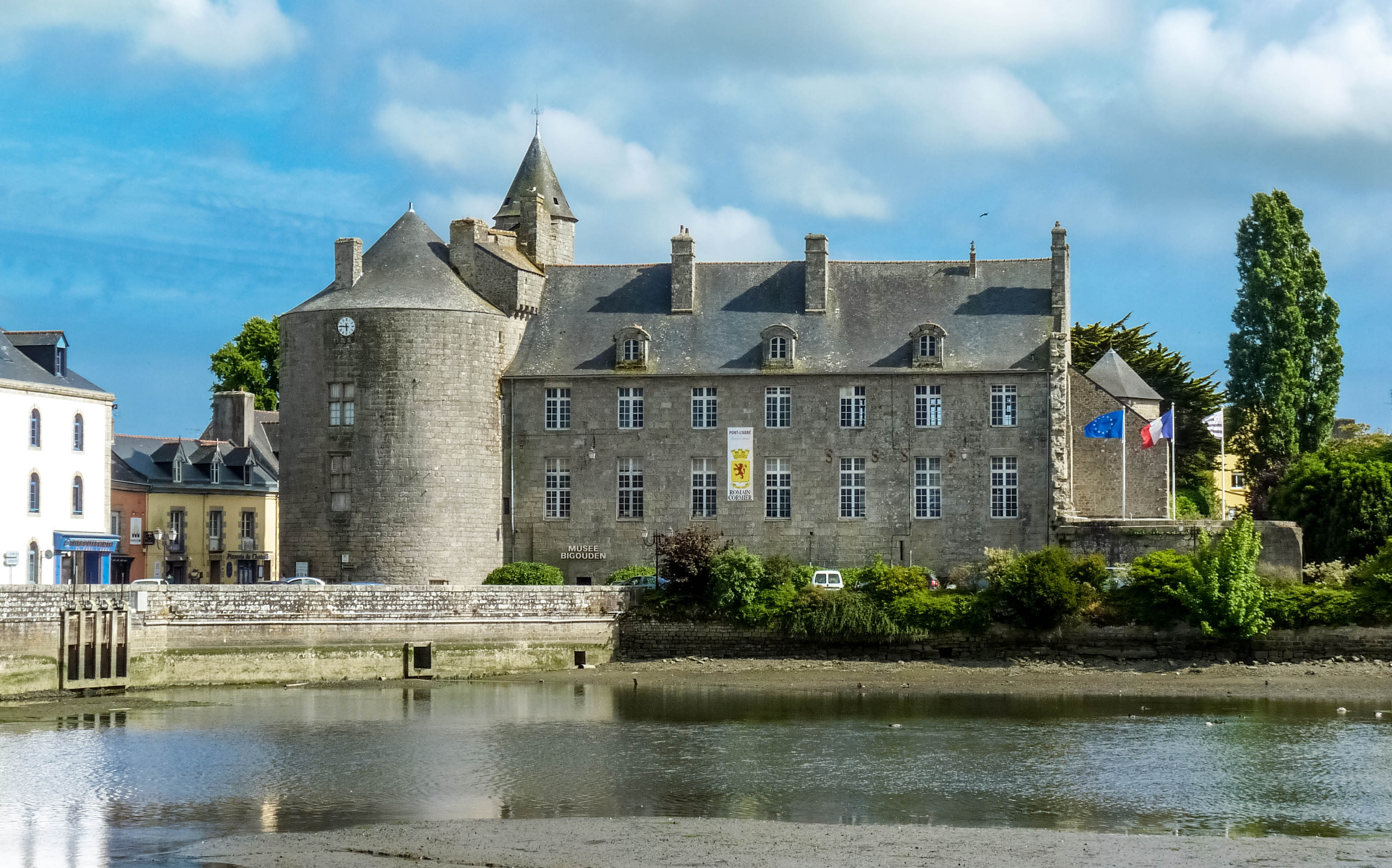
the Castle's keep, north view.

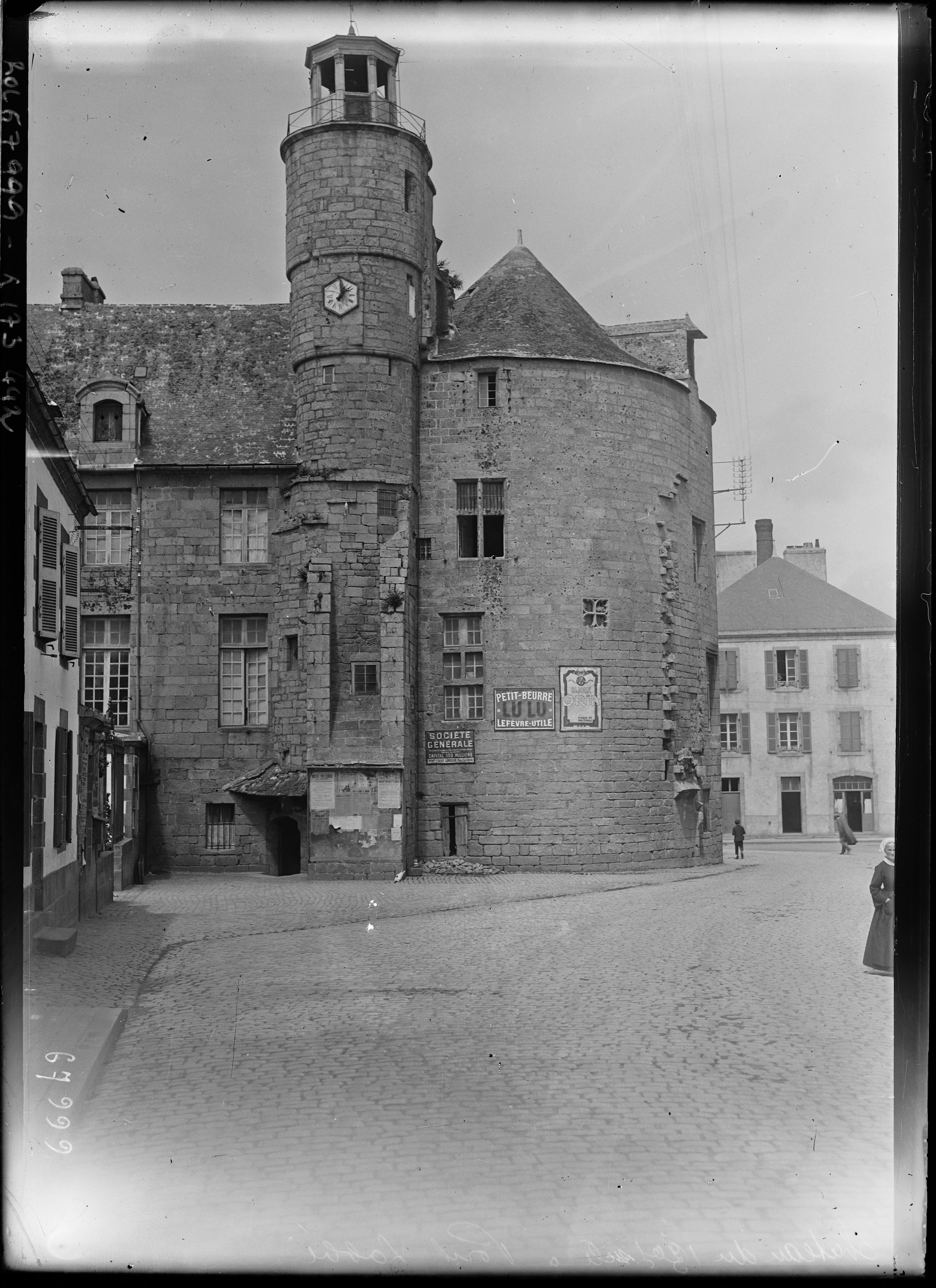
the Castle's keep, from Rue Kereon, 1921.

== International relations ==
Pont-l'Abbé is twinned with:

- Betanzos, Spain
- Schleiden, Germany
- Bantry, Ireland

== Personalities ==
- Serge Duigou, historian, specialising in the history of Brittany.
- Gaël Julien, a racing driver currently competing in the European Le Mans Series.
- Jérôme Kerviel, the trader formerly with Société Générale in Paris that was linked with losses of approximately €4.9 billion (US$7.16 billion) stemming from fraudulent equity index futures trading, grew up in Pont-l'Abbé.
- Régis Le Bris, football manager, currently the head coach of Premier League club Sunderland.
- Vincent Riou, a yacht race Sailor who distinguished himself at Vendée Globe Challenge 2004-2005 (1st) and 2008-2009 (3rd) with act of bravery, saving Jean Le Cam's life, who was sinking near of Cape Horn.

== See also ==
- Communes of the Finistère department
- François Bazin (sculptor)
