= Roudouallec =

Roudouallec Roudoualleg
- Commune
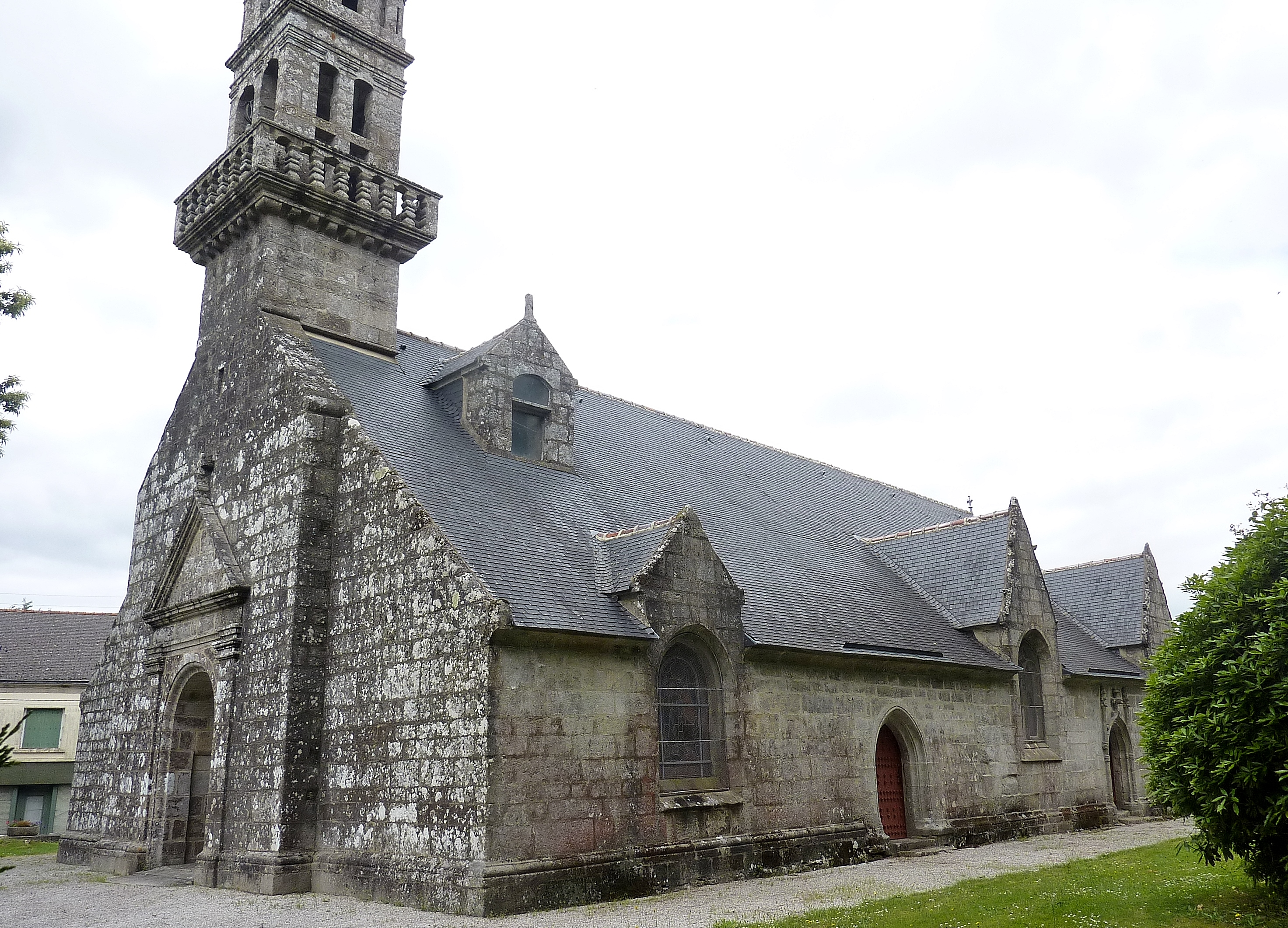
- The parish church
- Location of Roudouallec
- Location within France Location within Brittany
- Coordinates: 48°07′39″N 3°42′56″W
- Country: France
- Region: Brittany
- Department: Morbihan
- Arrondissement: Pontivy
- Canton: Gourin
- Intercommunality: Roi Morvan Communauté

Government
  - Mayor (2026–32): Paul Cozic
- Area^{1}: 24.82 km^{2} (9.58 sq mi)
- Highest elevation: 248 m (814 ft)
- Lowest elevation: 118 m (387 ft)
- Population (2023): 722
  - Density: 29.1/km^{2} (75.3/sq mi)
- Time zone: UTC+01:00 (CET)
  - Summer (DST): UTC+02:00 (CEST)
- INSEE/Postal code: 56199 /56110
- ^{1} French Land Register data, which excludes lakes, ponds, glaciers > 1 km^{2} (0.386 sq mi or 247 acres) and river estuaries.

Roudouallec (French pronunciation: [ʁudwalɛk]; Breton: Roudoualleg) is a commune in the Morbihan department of Brittany in north-western France. Inhabitants of Roudouallec are called in French Roudouallecois.

== Geography ==
Roudouallec is located 32 km (20 mi) northeast of Quimper and 88 km (55 mi) northwest of Vannes. The village lies on the southern slope of the Montagnes Noires (french, Black mountains).

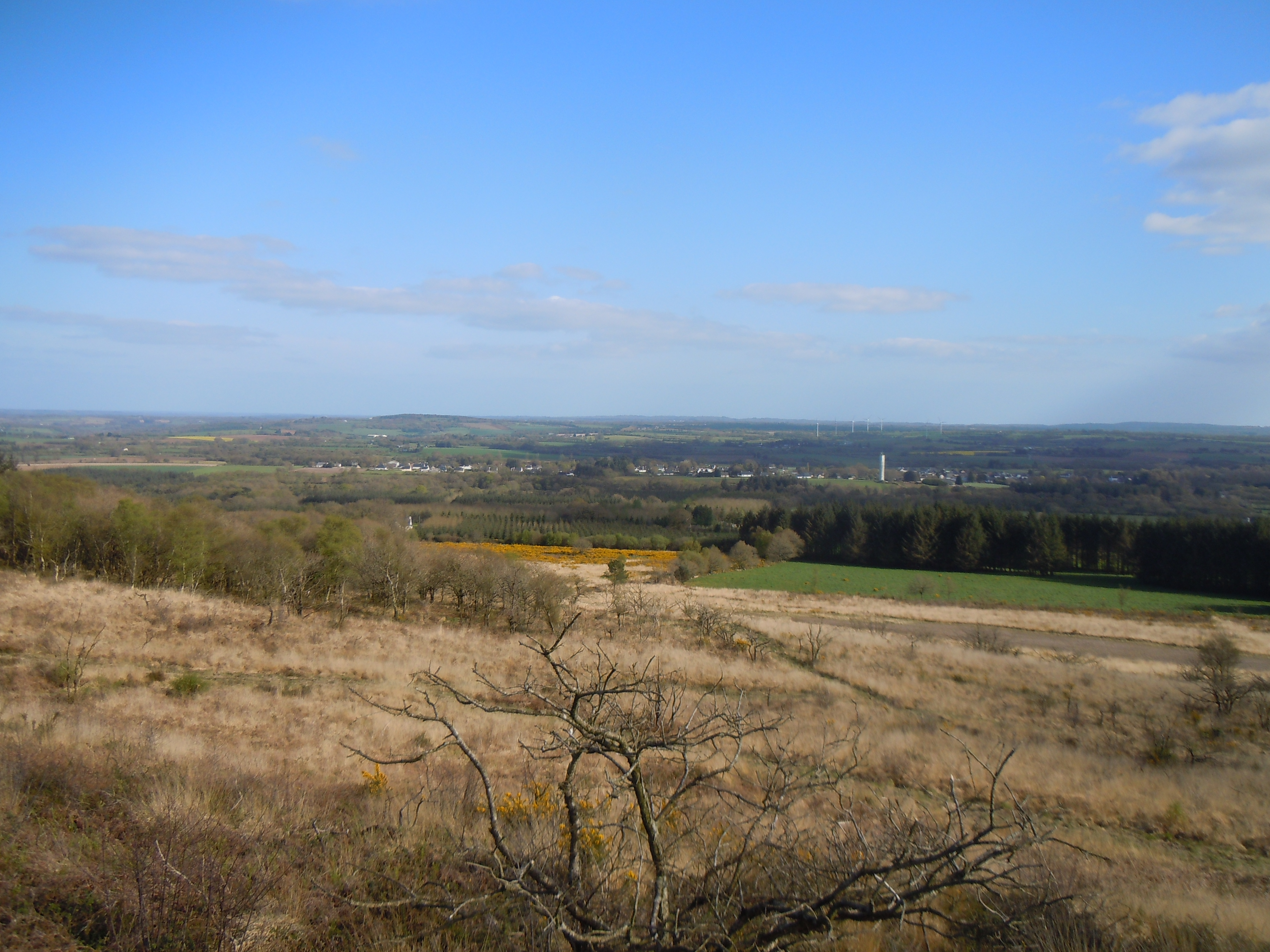
General view.

=== Neighboring communes ===
Roudouallec is border by Gourin to the east, by Guiscriff and Scaër to the south, by Leuhan and Saint-Goazec to the west and by Spézet to the north.

== Map ==
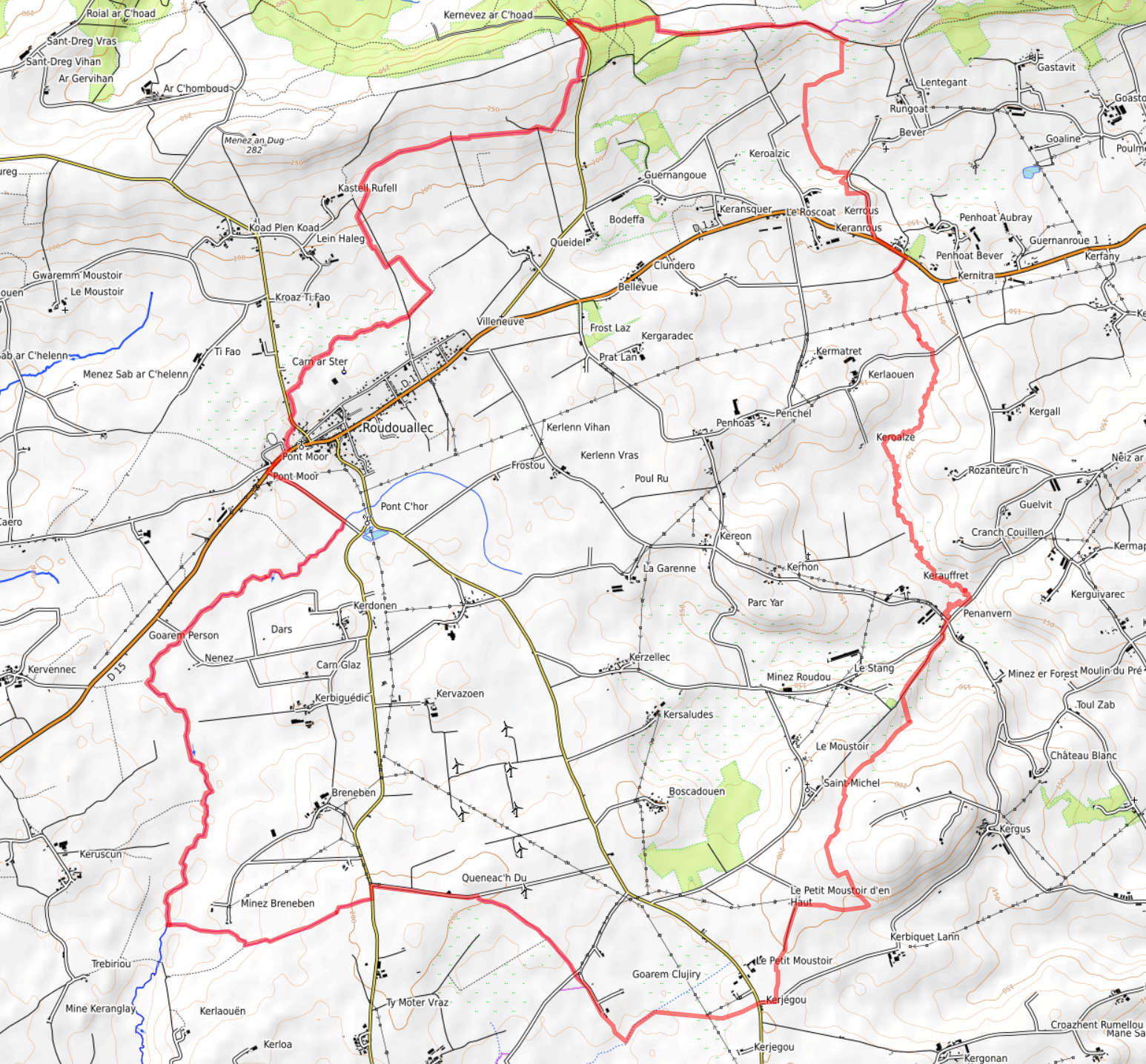
Topographic map

== Population ==
Roudouallec's population peaked at 1,656 in 1911 and declined to 722 in 2023. This represents a 56% decrease in total population since the peak census figure.

Historical population

Year	Pop.	±% p.a.
1793	820	—
1800	1,112	+4.45%
1806	891	−3.63%
1821	822	−0.54%
1831	940	+1.35%
1836	1,053	+2.30%
1841	1,005	−0.93%
1846	1,056	+0.99%
1851	1,079	+0.43%
1856	1,066	−0.24%
1861	1,081	+0.28%
1866	1,045	−0.68%
1872	1,063	+0.29%
1876	1,100	+0.86%
1881	1,172	+1.28%
1886	1,248	+1.26%
1891	1,248	+0.00%
1896	1,352	+1.61%
1901	1,364	+0.18%

Year	Pop.	±% p.a.
1906	1,435	+1.02%
1911	1,684	+3.25%
1921	1,656	−0.17%
1926	1,525	−1.63%
1931	1,479	−0.61%
1936	1,424	−0.76%
1946	1,390	−0.24%
1954	1,215	−1.67%
1962	1,100	−1.24%
1968	1,144	+0.66%
1975	961	−2.46%
1982	856	−1.64%
1990	772	−1.28%
1999	700	−1.08%
2007	704	+0.07%
2012	713	+0.25%
2017	710	−0.08%
2023	722	+0.28%

Source: EHESS and INSEE (1968-2023)

== History ==
The area around Roudouallac is represented on the Saint-Bélec slab, dating to the early Bronze Age and identified as the earliest known map that can be tied to a specific location.

Nicolas Le Grand, tailor born in Roudouallec in 1852 emigrated in 1881 to the United States. He was followed by other inhabitants.

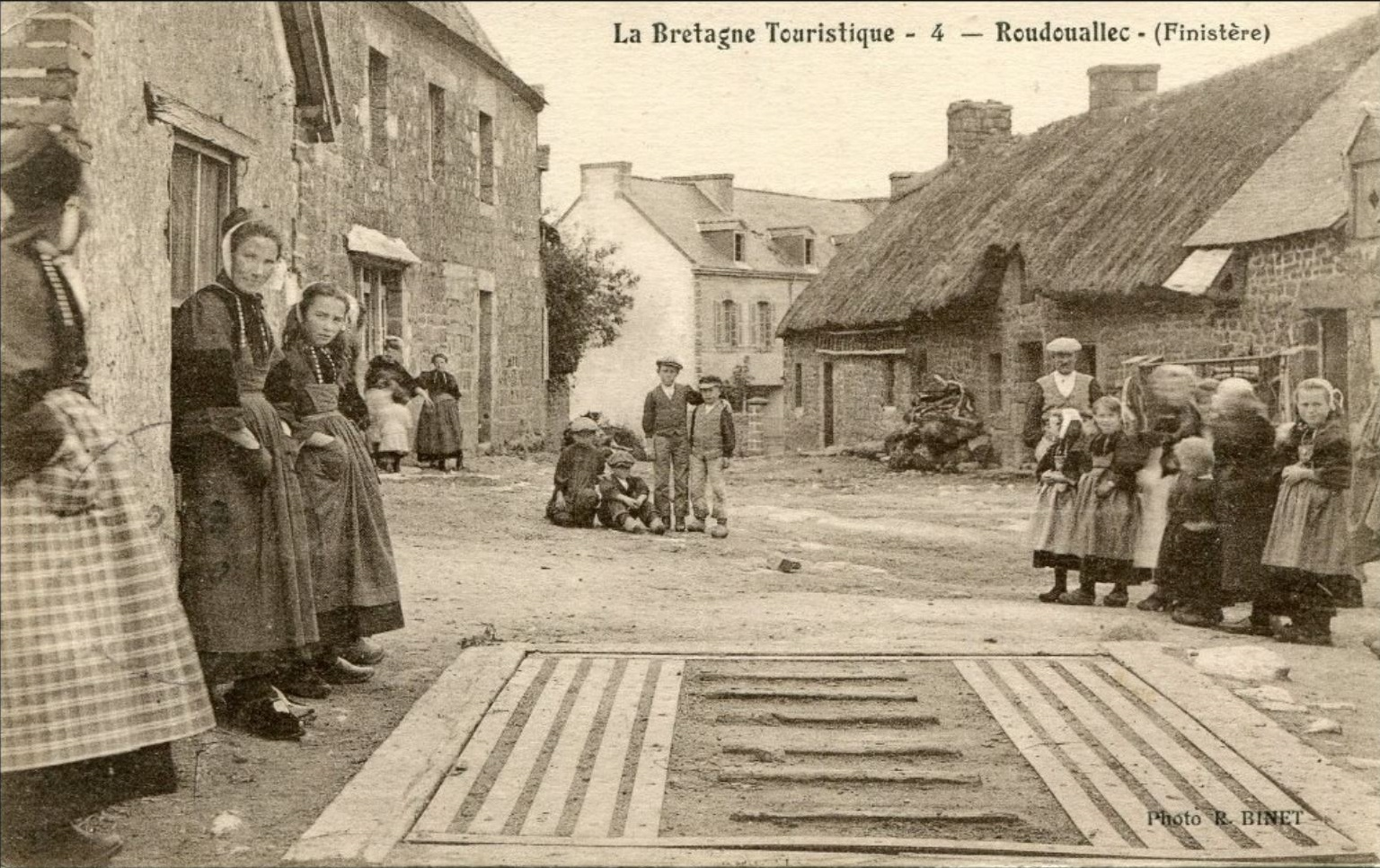
Roudouallec at the beginning of the twentieth century.

== See also ==
- Communes of the Morbihan department
- Entry on sculptor of local war memorial Jean Joncourt
