= Job an Irien =

French writer and Roman Catholic priest (1937–2025)

- Born: Joseph Irien; 15 October 1937; Bodilis, France
- Died: 2 February 2025 (aged 87)
- Education: Landévennec Abbey
- Occupations: Writer; Priest

Joseph Irien (15 October 1937 – 2 February 2025), better known by the pen name Job an Irien, was a French writer and Roman Catholic priest.

== Life and career ==
Born in Bodilis on 15 October 1937, Irien completed his secondary studies at the Collège du Kreisker in Saint-Pol-de-Léon. From 1967 to 1982, he was a chaplain at the Lycée à l'Harteloire in Brest. In 1962, he was ordained in Pont-Croix after spending two years in meditation at Landévennec Abbey. In 1965, he began to celebrate masses in French, Breton, and Latin.

Irien taught the Breton language to children, serving as the chaplain of Bleun-Brug until 1982. In 1984, he founded a Breton spiritual center alongside Francis Barbu and François-Mathurin Gourvès. In 1997, he published a missal in the Breton language under the authority of the Roman Catholic Diocese of Quimper. Throughout his career, he published controversial articles discussing the inclusion of married men, women, and homosexuality in the Catholic Church, as well as the historical desire of the French state to de-Bretonize the region.

Job an Irien died on 2 February 2025, at the age of 87.

== Publications ==
=== Spirituality and history ===
- Itron Varia ar Folgoet. Ar la recherche de la vérité sur Notre Dame du Folgoët (1989)
- Eun dornad komzou evid pedi. Une poignée de mots pour prier (1990)
- Jalons pour une Spiritualité bretonne et celtique chrétienne. Evid eur Speredelez breizad ha keltieg kristen (1993)
- Iwerzon. Irlande (1994)
- En hent. Pèlerins (1995)
- Douar Santel. Terre Sainte (1998)
- Sanctuaires en Finistère. Pardoniou braz (2006)
- Rumengol, 1858-2008 (2008)
- War roudou tadou or feiz e Hanternoz Bro-Gembre. Sur les traces de nos pères dans la foi au nord du Pays de Galles (2013)
- Eur vuhez nevez : Ar vadeziant. Une vie nouvelle : le baptême (2014)
- Kleñvejou-red e Penn-ar-Bed. Épidémies en Finistère (2020)

=== Chronicles ===
- Soubenn an tri zraig (1995)
- Araog poueza butun (1997)
- Dour ar feunteun (1998)
- Heñchou nevez (1999)
- Gwenn ha du hag a beb liou (2000)
- Etre deiz ha noz (2002)
- Or bed o trei (2003)
- Soñjou diwar vond. Réflexions au fil du temps (2006)
- Deiz goude deiz. Chroniques d’un jour à l’autre (2008)
- Eonenn an deiziou ha blaz ar vuez. L’écume des jours et la saveur de la vie (2010)
- Soñjou koz... ha nevez. Réflexions d’hier et d’aujourd’hui (2011)
- Ar vuez eo... ha Douar Santel 2012 (2012)
- Dour ha skêrijenn. Eau et lumière (2013)
- Eur wenojenn. Un sentier (2014)
- Bannou Heol. Rayons de soleil (2015)
- Vel eun dornad bleuniou. Une poignée de fleurs (2016)
- Perlez an mintin. Les perles du matin (2017)
- Dibab ar vuez. Choisis la vie (2018)
- Blaz an deiziou. La saveur des jours (2020)
- Pennadou 2020. Chroniques 2020 (2020)
- Pennadou 2021. Chroniques 2021 (2021)
- Pennadou 2022. Chroniques 2022 (2022)

=== Play ===
- Saint Paul Aurélien. Du pays de Galles à Ouessant. Sant Paol Aorelian, euz Bro-Gembre da Enez-Eusa (1991)

=== Musicals ===
- Ar Marh dall (1979)
- Ar Missa Keltia (1982)
- War varh d’ar mor (1987)
- Kan evid ar peoh. Cantate pour la Paix (1989)
- Kalon ar bed. Le cœur du monde (2000)

== Distinction ==
- Order of the Ermine (2007)
