= Pierre Le Moine =

Breton architect (1927–2023)

Pierre Julien Yves Marie Le Moine
- Born: 4 August 1927; Maël-Carhaix
- Died: 19 October 2023 (aged 96); Brittany, France
- Other names: Per Le Moine
- Occupations: Architect, Activist
- Known for: Breton nationalism

Pierre Julien Yves Marie Le Moine, or Per Le Moine (4 August 1927 – 19 October 2023), was an architect and Breton nationalist activist.

== Family ==
He was the brother-in-law of Erwan Vallerie. His father, Julien Lemoine, was Mayor of Maël-Carhaix.

Le Moine's eldest daughter was the artist Anna Le Moine Gray.

== Breton nationalism ==
He learned Breton with Marguerite Gourlaouen, and followed the correspondence courses of Skol Ober as well as those given at the Breton cultural center of Paris Kêr-Vreiz. He participated regularly for 10 years in the Kamp Etrekeltiek ar Vrezhonegerien, with Vefa de Bellaing, Xavier de Langlais, Ronan Huon and Maodez Glanndour.

He was a member of the Cultural Institute of Brittany, and former president of the International Relations section. He was also a co-founder of the Movement for the Organization of Brittany (MOB) and leader of the Breton Liberation Front.

In 1955 in Brest, Pierre Le Moine and other Breton nationalist founded the magazine Ar Vro and later Jeune Bretagne that became L'Avenir de la Bretagne; he was a regular contributor to Armor Magazine.

He was an original administrator of Kuzul ar Brezhoneg and continued for 20 years.

In 1949 he was a founding member of the Federal Union of European Nationalities (FUEN). He was vice-president from 1980 to 1986, then president for Europe from 1986 to 1990. He represented the FUEN at the Council of Europe for 17 years from 1990 and at the OSCE since 1992.

A Commander of the Order of St John (Denmark), he was also awarded the Order of the Ermine in 1994 and the Order of the European Combatant.

He was the president of the Menez Kamm, European Youth Center, opened in the property of Countess Vefa de Saint-Pierre. He was also the founder of the Brittany Regional Action Committee in 1961.

He was the inspiration for the Blue Book of Brittany, which, without him, could not have been written or published, as recorded by Louis Mélennec.

== Jersey ==
He moved to Jersey in 1971 after his arrest alongside other Breton activists, where he became President of the Société Jersiaise de Bienfaisance.

== Death ==
He died on the 19th October 2023.
