= List of composers from Brittany =

This is a list of composers from Brittany.

== A ==
- René Abjean (born 1937)
- Georges Arnoux (1891–1972)
- Louis Aubert (1877–1968)

== B ==
- Paul Bastide (1879–1962)
- François Benoist (1794–1878)
- Eugène Bigot (1888–1965)
- Louis-Albert Bourgault-Ducoudray (1840–1910)

== C ==
- Jacques Collebaut (Jacquet of Mantua) (1483–1559)
- Jean Cras (1879–1932)

== D ==
- Charles Delioux (1825–1915)
- Maurice Duhamel (1884–1940)
- Émile Durand (1830–1903)

== H ==
- Lucien Haudebert (1877–1963)
- Aristide Hignard (1822–1898)
- Jean Huré (1877–1930)

== L ==
- Théodore Lack (1846–1921)
- Paul Ladmirault (1877–1944)
- Jean Langlais (1907–1991)
- Paul Le Flem (1881–1984)
- Jef Le Penven (1919–1967)

== M ==
- Victor Massé (1822–1884)
- Léon Moreau (1870–1946)

== R ==
- Rhené-Baton (1879–1940)
- Théodore Ritter (1840–1887)
- Joseph Guy Ropartz (1864–1955)

== S ==
- Alice Sauvrezis (1866–1946)
- Claude-Michel Schönberg (born 1944)
- Gaston Serpette (1846–1904)
- Alan Simon (born 1964)
- Didier Squiban (born 1959)
- Alan Stivell (born 1944)

== V ==
- Louis Vuillemin (1879–1929)
