= Société préhistorique française =

French learned society

The Société préhistorique française is a society founded in 1904, recognized as being of public utility in 1910. It obtained the Grand Prix de l'Archéologie in 1982. Its main activities are the organization of scientific meetings and the publication of monographs, of proceedings of conferences and of the journal Bulletin de la Société préhistorique française.

== Past presidents ==
The French Prehistoric Society was notably chaired by Léon Henri-Martin, Léon Coutil, Armand Viré, Jean Pagès-Allary, Félix Régnault, André Vayson de Pradenne, Paul Rivet, Saint-Just Péquart, Henri Breuil, André Leroi-Gourhan, Louis-René Nougier, Camille Arambourg, René Joffroy, Pierre-Roland Giot, Jacques Briard, Denise de Sonneville-Bordes, Yves Coppens, Jean Roche, Jean Clottes et Jacques Jaubert.

Gérard Bailloud, Christiane Éluère, Jean Clottes, Yves Coppens, Henri de Lumley, Jean Guilaine, Jean-Pierre Mohen, Claude Constantin and Jean Leclerc are honorary presidents.
