= Jacques Weulersse =

French geographer

- Born: February 11, 1905; Paris
- Died: August 28, 1946 (aged 41); Dakar
- Citizenship: French
- Occupation: Geographer

Jacques Weulersse (1905-1946) was a French geographer of Africa and the Arab world.

== Early life ==
On February 11, 1905, Weulersse was born in Paris, France.

== Education ==
In 1928, Weulersse received his bachelor's degree in history and geography. In 1928, Weulersse received the last Autour Du Monde travel scholarship that was financed by a foundation funded by Albert Kahn, a banker.

In 1941, Weulersse obtained his Doctorate of Letters.

== Career ==
Weulersse became a professor at Chartres, and at Lycée Condorcet.

In 1943, Weulersse became a master of colonial geography at Aix-Marseille University.

== Personal life ==
On August 28, 1946, Weulersse died in Dakar, Senegal.

== Works ==
- Le pays des Alaouites, Thèse, Tours, Arrault, 1940, 2 volumes, 422 p.
- Noirs et Blancs. A travers l'Afrique nouvelle de Dakar au Cap, Paris, Armand Colin, 1931, 242 p. (Re-printed 1993, Paris)

== See also ==
- Albert Kahn (banker) - provider of travelling scholarship.
- Maurice Le Lannou

== Additional sources ==
- Mâeouchy, Nadine; Sluglett, Peter (2004). Les Mandats français et anglais dans une perspective comparative. BRILL. ISBN 9789004133136.
