= Pierre-Yves Le Rhun =

French geographer and Breton activist (1936–2025)

- Born: 1936; Tréméoc, France
- Died: 12 October 2025 (aged 88–89); Pont-l'Abbé, France
- Education: University of Lyon
- Occupations: Geographer; Academic

Pierre-Yves Le Rhun (French: [pjɛʁ iv lə ʁœ̃]; 1936 – 12 October 2025) was a French geographer, academic and Breton activist.

== Life and career ==
Born in Tréménoc in 1936, Le Rhun grew up in a peasant family from Bigouden. After secondary school, he studied geography at the University of Lyon, where he had his thesis directed by Maurice Le Lannou. After his graduation in 1962, he completed his military service before returning to Brittany.

After serving as a secondary school geography teacher, he joined the University of Nantes as an assistant professor in 1968. He became a full professor after writing a thesis titled L'aviculture intensive en Bretagne. He wrote numerous articles and contributions to scientific journals and collective works, including Le Monde diplomatique. As a committed geographer, he dedicated much of his time to cultural preservation in Brittany, such as preserving bocage bridges, the protection of the Guérande salt marshes, and opposing the Carnet nuclear power project. He served as president of the Breton organization Ar Falz, which created the Front culturel progressiste breton under his presidency. He also advocated for the administrative reunion of the Brittany region to include the Loire-Atlantique department as leader of the Comité pour l'unité administrative de la Bretagne, of which he served as president from 1983 to 1986 and 1996 to 2000. This organization later became Bretagne Réunie, which contributed to analyses and surveys on public opinion and emphasizing the importance of a democratic debate on regional borders. In 1973, he published an article in Le Monde, which covered the way the May 68 protests awakened many minority linguistic groups in France.

In 2000, Le Rhun was awarded the Order of the Ermine for his engagement with the Breton culture and identity. In 2015, he received the Médaille de l'Institut culturel de Bretagne for his book Géographie numérique de la Bretagne.

Le Rhun died in Pont-l'Abbé on 12 October 2025.

== Works ==
- Géographie économique de la Bretagne (1971)
- Géographie de la Bretagne (1976)
- Bretagne et Grand Ouest (1988)
- La Bretagne face à l'Europe et à l'Île-de-France (1991)
- Géographie et aménagement de la Bretagne (1994)
- Géographie numérique de la Bretagne (2016)
