= Saint-Bélec slab =

Stone artefact from Western Brittany

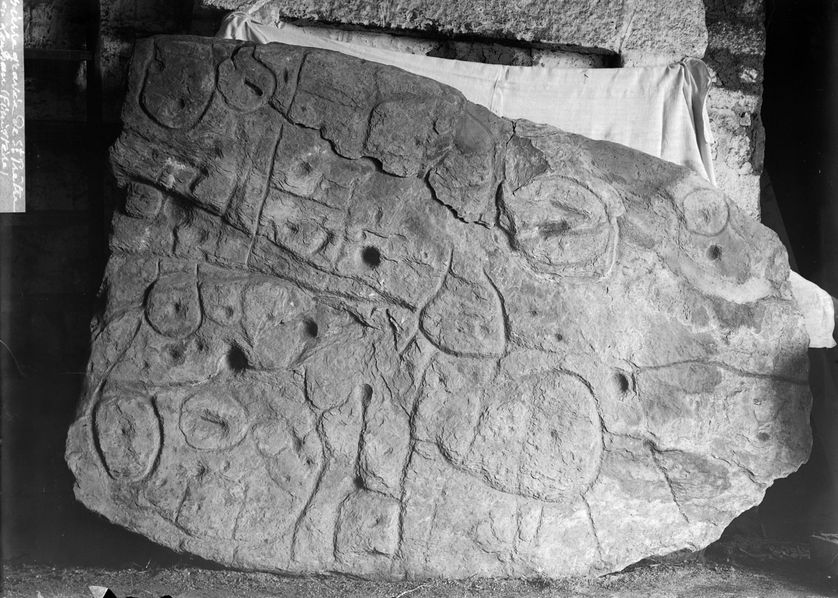
- Material: Schist
- Length: 3.86 meters
- Height: 1.86 meters
- Width: 2.1 meters
- Created: c. 1875 BC
- Discovered: 1900; Brittany, France
- Discovered by: Paul Chatellier

The Saint-Bélec slab (Breton: Taol Sant-Beleg) is a stone artefact from western Brittany thought to be a map of an early Bronze Age principality. It was discovered in 1900 by Paul du Châtellier in a prehistoric burial ground near Leuhan, Finistère, where it formed part of an early Bronze Age cist structure. Du Châtellier kept the slab at his house, the Château de Kernuz, before it came into the collection of the National Archaeological Museum. It was forgotten until 2014 when it was rediscovered in the cellar of the château. A 2017–2021 study by French and British universities and institutes identified the slab as an early Bronze Age map of part of the Odet valley. The slab is the earliest known map found in Europe and probably the earliest map of any known territory.

== Early history ==
The slab was made during the early Bronze Age, likely around 1875 BC, which makes it the oldest known map in Europe and "probably the oldest map of a territory that has been identified". It is roughly contemporaneous with the Nebra sky disc, a map of the cosmos found in Germany. The Saint-Bélec slab was broken and repurposed as part of the cist towards the end of the early Bronze Age, circa 1900–1600 BC. Its destruction may have been an iconoclastic act, demonstrating the formal rejection of the previous political entity.

== Discovery ==
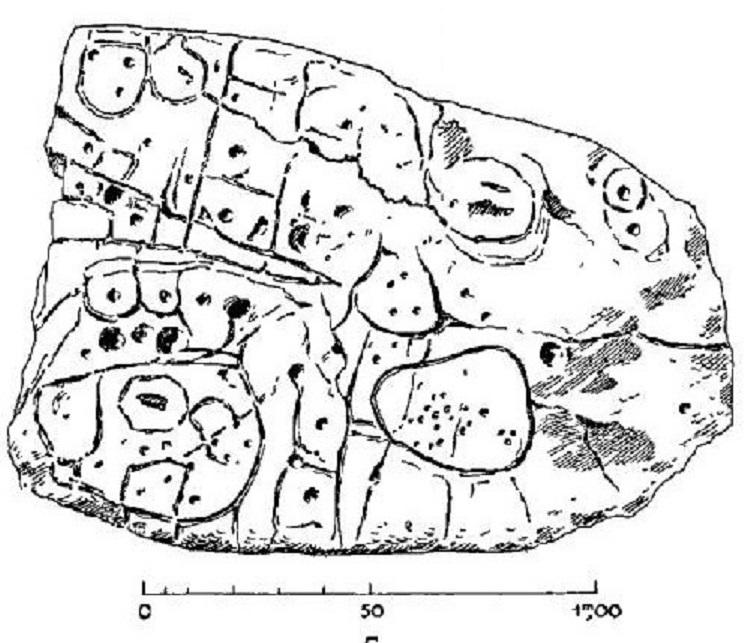
A 1901 drawing of the slab by du Châtellier, length: 2.2 m, width: 1.53 m

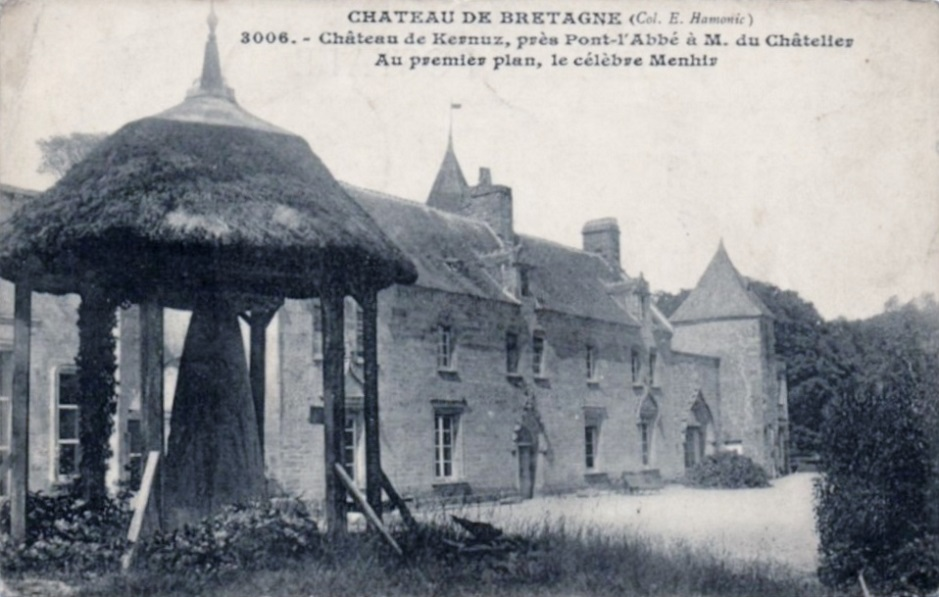
The Château de Kernuz in 1910. The object at left is a prehistoric menhir recovered by du Châtellier.

The slab was discovered in 1900 by Paul du Châtellier in a prehistoric burial ground in Finistère, western Brittany. It formed the wall of a cist burial. The cist measured 3.86 metres (12.7 ft) long, 2.1 metres (6.9 ft) wide and 1.86 metres (6.1 ft) high and was oriented on an east-west alignment. It contained a broken ceramic pot, which has since been lost, and was buried under layers of stone rubble. The recovered portion of the slab measured 2.2 metres (7.2 ft) long, 1.53 metres (5.0 ft) wide and 16 centimetres (0.52 ft) thick and weighed around 1 tonne (1 long ton). It was made from a grey-blue schist, thought to come from rocky outcrops from the Precambrian period found close to Douarnenez. The slab had been broken prior to its burial and the upper portion was missing. The unbroken slab may have been around 3.9 metres (12.7 ft) long.

Du Châtellier stored the slab at his house, Château de Kernuz. Sources differ as to whether the slab was donated to the National Archaeological Museum after du Châtellier's death or if it was acquired by a private museum soon after discovery and then by the National Archaeological Museum in 1924. In either case, the slab remained at the Château and, until the 1990s, was stored in a niche in the Château's moat before being moved to its cellar.

== Rediscovery ==
The slab was rediscovered in the cellar at the Château de Kernuz in 2014. Researchers who read du Châtellier's original reports had independently come to the conclusion that the slab represented an early map because of the intricate engravings present on it. The French National Institute for Preventive Archaeological Research, Bournemouth University, the French National Centre for Scientific Research, and the University of Western Brittany carried out a joint study of the slab between 2017 and 2021. The study was published as an article in April 2021 in the Bulletin de la Société préhistorique française of the Société préhistorique française.

The engravings on the slab were found to be well-preserved which suggested that it had not been exposed to the open air for very long; the study team carried out 3D surveys and photogrammetry to record them. The engravings, which are formed of geometric shapes such as lines, circles and squares, were interpreted as map symbols representing settlements, barrows, and fields. It was noted that the symbols on the slab matched the landscape of the Odet valley in Finistère, with lines used to represent the river's tributaries. The surface of the slab has been carved so that it represents the undulations of the land. Taken as a map, the slab depicts an area of land measuring approximately 30 by 21 kilometres (19 mi × 13 mi) with around 80% accuracy when compared with modern maps.

The study concluded that the map probably represented the extent of a political entity, probably a Bronze Age principality. A central circular motif, located near to the sources of the Odet, the Isole and the Stêr Laër, might represent the prince's enclosure. The map was probably not used for navigation purposes but as an expression of power. It may be a cadastral plan associated with the introduction of a new type of land tenure in the principality; some of the markings on the map may depict land use or ownership. The production of the map demonstrates a strongly hierarchical political organisation that probably exercised strong control over the area shown for a number of centuries.

== See also ==
- Armorican Tumulus culture
