= Odet =

River in France

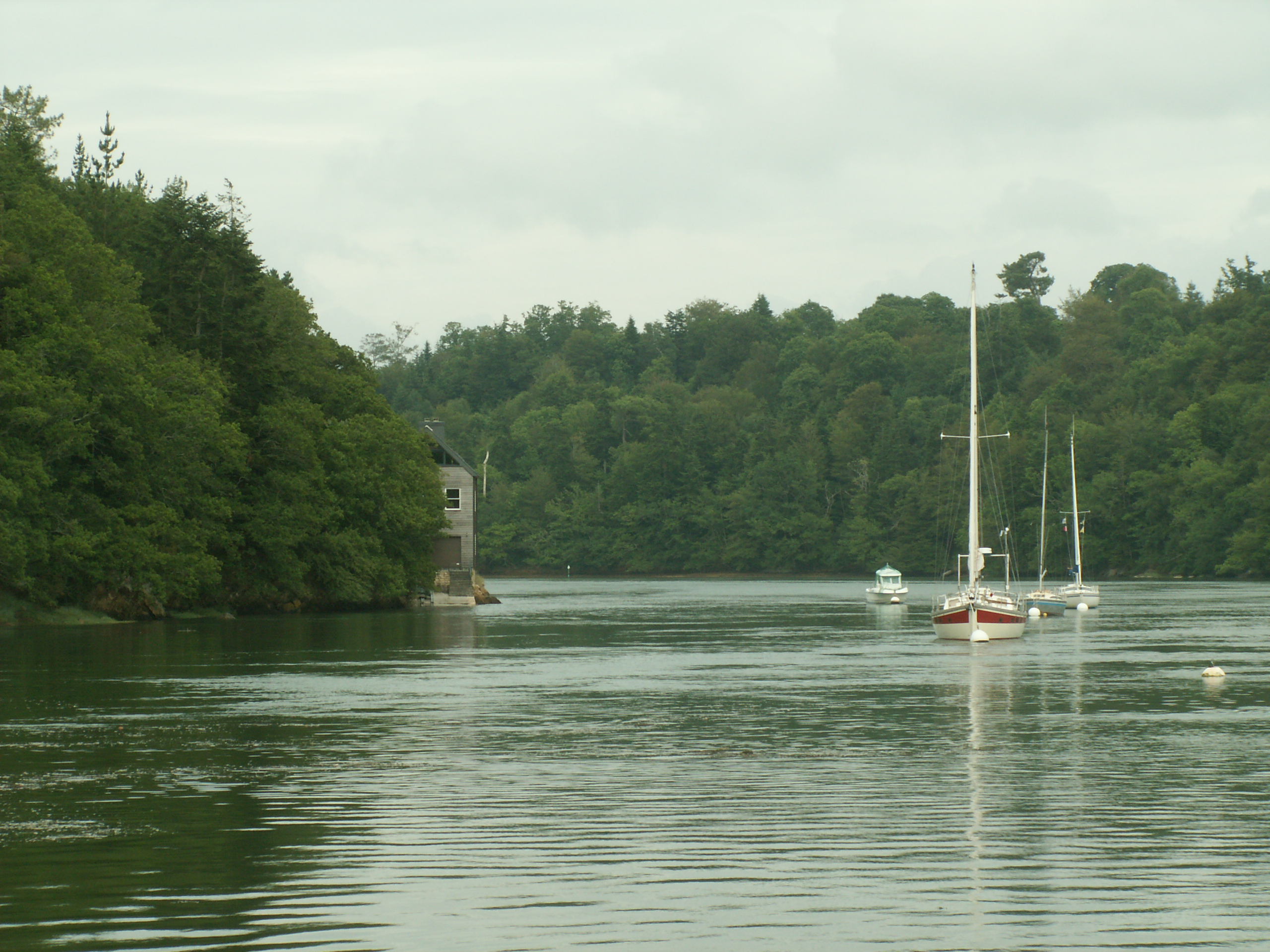
- The Odet at high tide

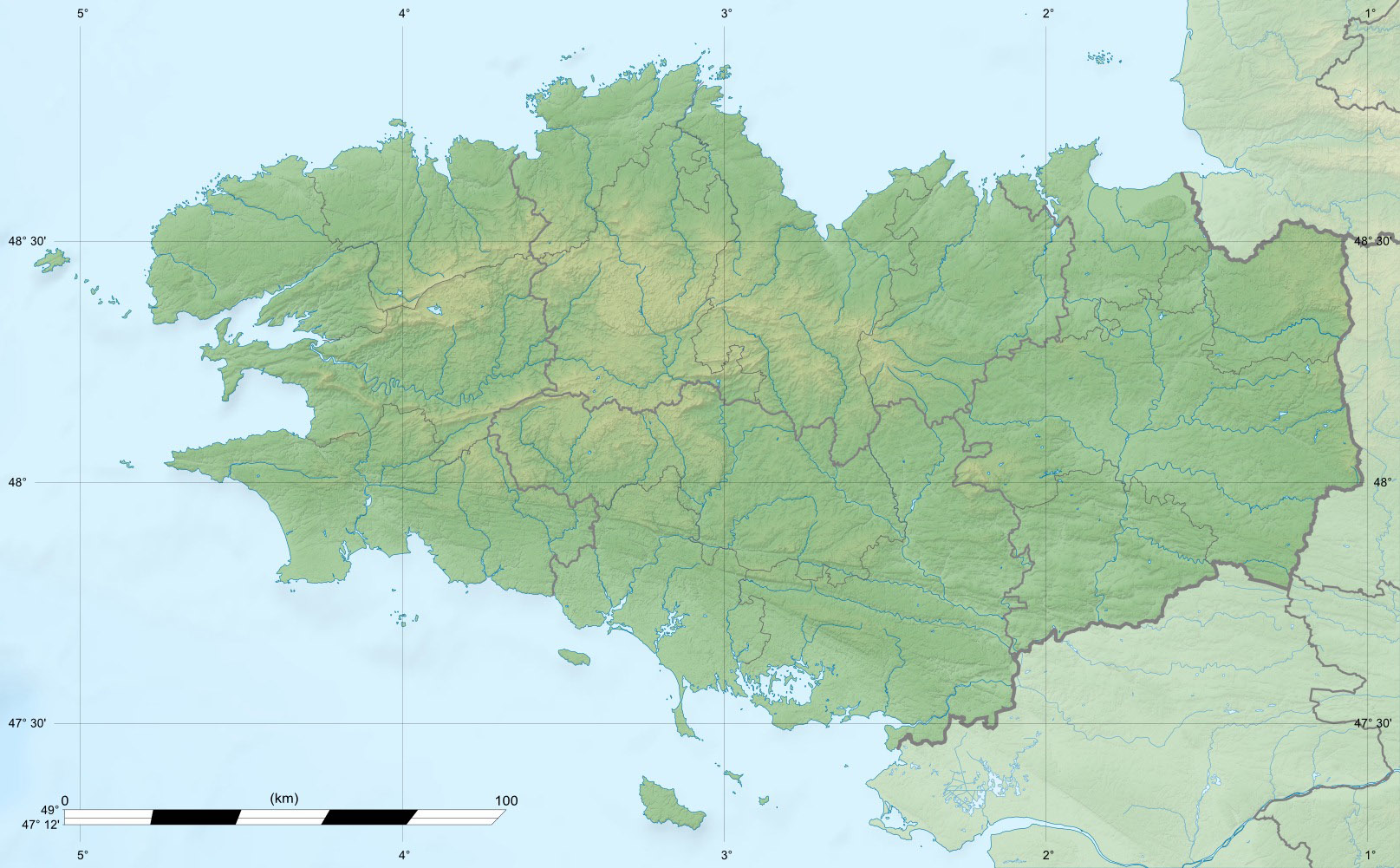

Location
- Country: France

Physical characteristics
- Source
  - location: Brittany
- Mouth
  - location: Atlantic Ocean
  - coordinates: 47°51′45″N 4°6′9″W
- Length: 62.7 km (39.0 mi)
- Basin size: 724 km^{2} (280 sq mi)

The Odet (French pronunciation: [ɔdɛ]; Breton: Oded) is a river in western France (Finistère department), which runs from Saint-Goazec (near Leuhan, in the Montagnes Noires of Brittany) into the Atlantic Ocean at Bénodet. The name of the town of Bénodet comes from the river; ben means river mouth in Breton.

The river runs past, or through, the towns of Bénodet, Combrit, Plomelin, Quimper, Ergué-Gabéric, Briec-de-l'Odet, Langolen, Coray, Trégourez, Leuhan and Saint-Goazec. It is 62.7 km (39.0 mi) long and its basin area is 724 km^{2} (280 sq mi).

The river is popular with kayakers.

In 2021, an article published in the Bulletin of the French Prehistoric Society reported that archaeologists had interpreted the Saint-Bélec slab, a 4,000-year-old stone rediscovered in 2014, as a three-dimensional representation of the Odet valley. This would make the Saint-Bélec slab the oldest known map of a territory in the world. According to the authors, the map probably was not used for navigation, but rather to show the political power and territorial extent of a local ruler's domain of the early Bronze Age. Measures of the slab were 2.2 metres long and 1.53 metres wide.

== In popular culture ==
In 2018, an online magazine was created called l'Odet. Notable interviews include Hayley Williams, Sharon Van Etten, Jack Mulhern, Megan Park, and Holly Humberstone. It was confirmed during a guest panel curated by Hayley Williams at Bonnaroo Music Festival in 2019 that the site was named for the river. The online publication is an offshoot of online anonymous submission platform Midnight Woman, named for the French ghost story "Les Lavandières", or "The Midnight Washerwomen". The l'Odet site states, "We are searching for human commonality through interviews and portraits; we actively prioritize the person, rather than the career, of each high-profile feature. Our interview style is comfortable, conversational, and intimate. We frequently talk about themes such as mental health, creative process, and relationships; however, no subject is off limits. All interviews are conducted by our founder, Cariann Bradley. Our creative director is Madeline Westfall."
