= Order of the Ermine (modern) =

Chivalric order

The Order of the Ermine (L’Ordre de l’Hermine) was originally a chivalric order of the 14th and 15th centuries in the Duchy of Brittany. The ermine is the emblem of Brittany. In the 20th century, it was revived by the Cultural Institute of Brittany as an honor for those contributing to Breton culture. It was created in 1972 to honor those who contribute to Breton culture and development. At its head is a Chancellor (Yves Lainé) and two vice-chancellors: Riwanon Kervella and André Lavanant. The siege is at the Institut Culturel de Bretagne, the castle of the Ermine, Vannes.

== Recipients ==
- In 1972 at Pontivy : René Pleven
- In 1973 at Rome : Gabriele Pescatore
- In 1973 at Rennes : Jean Mévellec
- In 1988 at Rennes : Vefa de Bellaing, Pierre-Roland Giot, Polig Monjarret, Henri Queffélec
- In 1989 at Nantes : Per Denez, Louis Lichou, Bernard de Parades, Maryvonne Quéméré-Jaouen
- In 1990 at Auray : Charles Le Gall, Émile Le Scanv (Glenmor), Joseph Martray, Albert Trévidic
- In 1991 at Quimper : Georges Lombard, Robert Le Grand, Pierre Laurent, Pierre-Jakez Hélias
- In 1992 at Saint-Malo : Ronan Huon, Yvonne Jean-Haffen, Michel Phlipponneau, Jordi Pujol
- In 1993 at Dinan : Anna-Vari Arzur, Herry Caouissin, Yann Poilvet, Jean Tricoire
- In 1994 at Vannes : Ivetig an Dred-Kervella, Pierre Le Moine, Yvonig Gicquel, Alan Stivell
- In 1995 at Guérande : Jacques Briard, Jean Fréour, Lois Kuter, Ivona Martin, Loeiz Ropars
- In 1996 at Pont-l'Abbé : André Lavanant, Joseph Lec'hvien, Pierre Le Treut, Rita Morgan Williams
- In 1997 at Quintin : Jean-Jacques Hénaff, Jean L'Helgouach, Dodik Jegou, Raymond Lebosse
- In 1998 at Vitré : Goulc'han Kervella, Henri Maho, Pierre Loquet, Naig Rozmor
- In 1999 at Nantes : Jean-Bernard Vighetti, Riwanon Kervella, Patrick Malrieu, Denise Delouche
- In 2000 at Pontivy : Tereza Desbordes, Lena Louarn, René Vautier, Pierre-Yves Le Rhun
- In 2001 at Landerneau : Rozenn Milin, Pierre Toulhoat, Marc Simon, Dan Ar Braz
- In 2002 at Lannion : Henri Lécuyer, Yves Rocher, Michael Jones, Robert Omnes
- In 2003 at Saint-Malo : René Abjean, Angèle Jacq, Jean-Louis Latour, Gilles Servat
- In 2004 at Châteaubriant : Albert Poulain, Yannig Baron, Marie Kermarec, Yann Goasdoué, Pierre-Yves Moign
- In 2005 at Loctudy : Ewa Waliszewska, Jean Kerhervé, Pierre Le Padellec, Jean Ollivro
- In 2006 at Ploemeur : Claudine Mazeas, Jean Pierre Vincent, Xavier Leclerc, Claude Sterckx
- In 2007 at Saint-Brieuc : Rhisiart Hincks, Job an Irien, Martial Pézénnec, François Le Quémener
- In 2008 at Rennes: Gweltaz ar Fur, Yvonne Breilly Le-Calvez, Viviane Hélias, Roger Abjean
- In 2009 at Ancenis : Jean-Christophe Cassard, Tugdual Kalvez, Yann-Fanch Kemener et Jean-Guy Le Floc'h, et Mona Ozouf, awarded during the Festival du Libre en Bretagne de Guérande le 21 novembre.
- In 2010 at Lorient: Catherine Latour, Annaig Renault, Donatien Laurent et André Chédeville.
- In 2011 at Quimper : Andréa ar Gouilh, Yann Choucq, Joseph Le Bihan, and André Pochon
- In 2012 at Guingamp : Albert Boché, Yves Lainé, Ivonig Le Merdy and the brothers Morvan
- In 2013 at Saint-Nicolas-de-Redon: Yves Pascal-Castel, Tangi Louarn, Martial Ménard, Jean-Jacques Monnier
- In 2022 at Josselin: Michel Chauvin, Yves Lebahy, Olier ar Mogn, Anne Quemere
