= Paul du Châtellier =

French prehistorian (1833-1911)

Paul du Châtellier (13 November 1833 - March 1911) was a French prehistorian.

He was the son of Armand Chatellier. In 1900, he discovered the Saint-Bélec slab, which is believed to be one of the world's oldest maps.
