= Pol Le Gourrierec =

French diplomat

Pol Le Gourrierec (or Le Gourriérec, 15 January 1921 – 19 July 1995) was a French diplomat who was best known for an incident during his service as French Ambassador to Pakistan.

== Early life ==
Born in Cléguérec in January 1921, he was fluent in Breton as well as French. In January 1945, he was one of the founders, along with poet and editor Ronan Huon, of the Breton language cultural magazine, Tír na nÓg which merged in 1948 with Al Liamm.

== Diplomatic service ==
He had an early interest in North Africa. In 1948, he joined the diplomatic service.

He served as an embassy secretary in Morocco in the late 1950s. He was Chargés d'Affaires in Iraq from February to September 1963. He was First Counselor of the Embassy in Warsaw in 1964. In the late 1960s, he was Director of North African Affairs, and visited Tunisia in 1969. He served as French Ambassador to Bulgaria from 1971 to 1975, to Pakistan from 1976 to 1979, and to the Czechoslovak Socialist Republic from 1979 to 1982.

== Pakistan ==
=== Background ===
The French had initially resisted US pressure to cancel a contract to build a nuclear fuel reprocessing plant, but the deal gradually unravelled sometime in mid to late 1978, certainly by February 1979, as the French became concerned about Pakistan's intentions regarding nuclear weapons.

=== Incident ===
On 26 June 1979, Le Gourrierec and his First Secretary, Jean Forlot, were stopped at a checkpoint. They were driving alone through the town of Kahuta some 25 miles southwest of Islamabad, in a vehicle with a local rather than a diplomatic number plate and without displaying a diplomatic flag. According to Denoël, they were driving to Islamabad, and intended to visit a long-unused military fortress, but accidentally took a wrong turn and passed near a secret nuclear bomb complex. However, according to several sources, their presence was intentional. There was a physical altercation with five or six men.

Le Gourrierec was severely beaten, and sustained a broken tooth, while Forlot had a split skull. The men who assaulted them were not bandits or thugs, as initially suggested by the Pakistani authorities, but were plain-clothed members of the security forces, acting under orders. According to Khan, Forlot was passing on information to the CIA and may have been actively spying on its behalf. Khan suggests that foreigners "got the message" and subsequently avoided the area, but the Yugoslav ambassador later drove slowly along the perimeter wall in a show of solidarity, albeit with a diplomatic flag.

== Personal life ==
He died in Puylaroque in July 1995 at the age of 74.

His son, Alain Le Gourriérec, was French Ambassador to Paraguay from 1993 to 1994, to Chile from 2001 to 2005, and to Mexico from 2005 to 2008.
