= Jacques Briard =

Jacques Briard and modern Armorican archeology

Jacques Briard (November 7, 1933 in Saint-Malo, France – June 14, 2002 in Chantepie, France) was a French archaeologist of prehistory. He was a student of Pierre-Roland Giot, the creator of modern Armorican archeology.

After his university studies in natural science at the University of Rennes, where he was the friend and partner of Yves Coppens, Jacques Briard entered the National Center of Scientific Research in 1955 as an archaeologist, where he eventually became research director. The numerous excavations in which he participated in and directed, and he directed, in Brittany and elsewhere, made him one of the great Bronze Age specialists in Europe, known for several scientific publications but also for his public outreach. Attached to the Breton culture, he notably collaborated with the publications of Ar Falz and Skol Vreizh (The Sickle/Breton School).

In particular, he is credited for the discovery of the princely tomb of tumulus de Kernonen (Plouvorn, Finistère), which contained exceptional wealth.

He was decorated with the Ordre de l'Hermine in 1995.

== Publications ==
- La femme sans bras Jacques Briard (Roman, Gunten Eds)
- La préhistoire en Brocéliande Jacques Briard (Guide, J.p. Gisserot)
- Carnac, lands of megaliths Jacques Briard (Guide, J.p. Gisserot)
- La Préhistoire de la Bretagne vue du ciel Jacques Briard & M. Gauthier (Étude, En France, J.p. Gisserot)
- Les cercles de pierres préhistoriques en Europe Jacques Briard (Étude, Hesperides, Errance)
- L'âge du bronze en Europe 2000-800 av. J.-C. Jacques Briard (Étude, Hesperides, Errance)
- L'âge du bronze en Europe, économie et société 2000-800 avant J.C. Jacques Briard (Étude, Hesperides, Errance)
- Préhistoire de l'Europe des origines à l'âge du fer Jacques Briard (Étude, Poche Histoire J.p. Gisserot)
- Les mégalithes Jacques Briard (Étude, poche, J.p. Gisserot)
- La préhistoire de l'Europe Jacques Briard (Étude, Bien Connaitre, J.p. Gisserot)
- Mégalithes de Saint-Just Jacques Briard (Étude, poche, J.p. Gisserot)
- Carnac, terre des mégalithes Jacques Briard (Guide, J.p. Gisserot)
- Les Représentations humaines du Néolithique à l'âge du fer Jacques Briard & Alain Duval (Actes, Comite Des Travaux Historiques Et Scientifiques, 01/1993)
- La Protohistoire de Bretagne et d'Armorique Jacques Briard (Étude, Universels Gisserot, J.p. Gisserot)
- Néolithique de la France, Poterie et civilisations T1 Jacques Briard (Étude, Hesperides, Errance)
- Chalcolithique et âge du bronze en France, Poterie et civilisations T2 Jacques Briard (Étude, Hesperides, Errance)
- Dolmens et menhirs de Bretagne Jacques Briard (Étude, J.p. Gisserot)
- Les Tumulus d'Armorique, L'Age du bronze en France T3 Jacques Briard & Yvan Onnée (Étude, Picard)
- Les mégalithes de l'Europe atlantique, architecture et art funéraire (5000-2000 avant J.-C.) Jacques Briard (Étude, Hesperides, Errance)
- Les mégalithes du département d'Ille et Vilaine Jacques Briard, Loïc Langouët, Yvan Onnee (Étude, Institut Culturel De Bretagne)
- Barnenez Jacques Briard (Étude, J.p. Gisserot)
- Protohistoire de la Bretagne Jacques Briard, Pierre-Roland Giot & Louis Pape (Étude, Ouest France)
- Mythes et symboles de l'Europe préceltique, les religions de l'âge du bronze (2500-800 av. J.-C.) Jacques Briard (Étude, Hesperides, Errance)
- Mégalithes de Bretagne Jacques Briard & Nicolas Fedievsky (Étude, Ouest France)
