= Bulletin de la Société préhistorique française =

The Bulletin de la Société préhistorique française is a French quarterly review published by the Société préhistorique française, the French Prehistoric Society. It has been published continuously from 1904 to the present day.

The discovery of the Saint-Bélec slab was first reported in the review in 2021.

The journal has been ranked A by the ERIH (European reference index for the humanities) program of the European Science Foundation.
