= Claude Sterckx =

Belgian Celticist (born 1944)

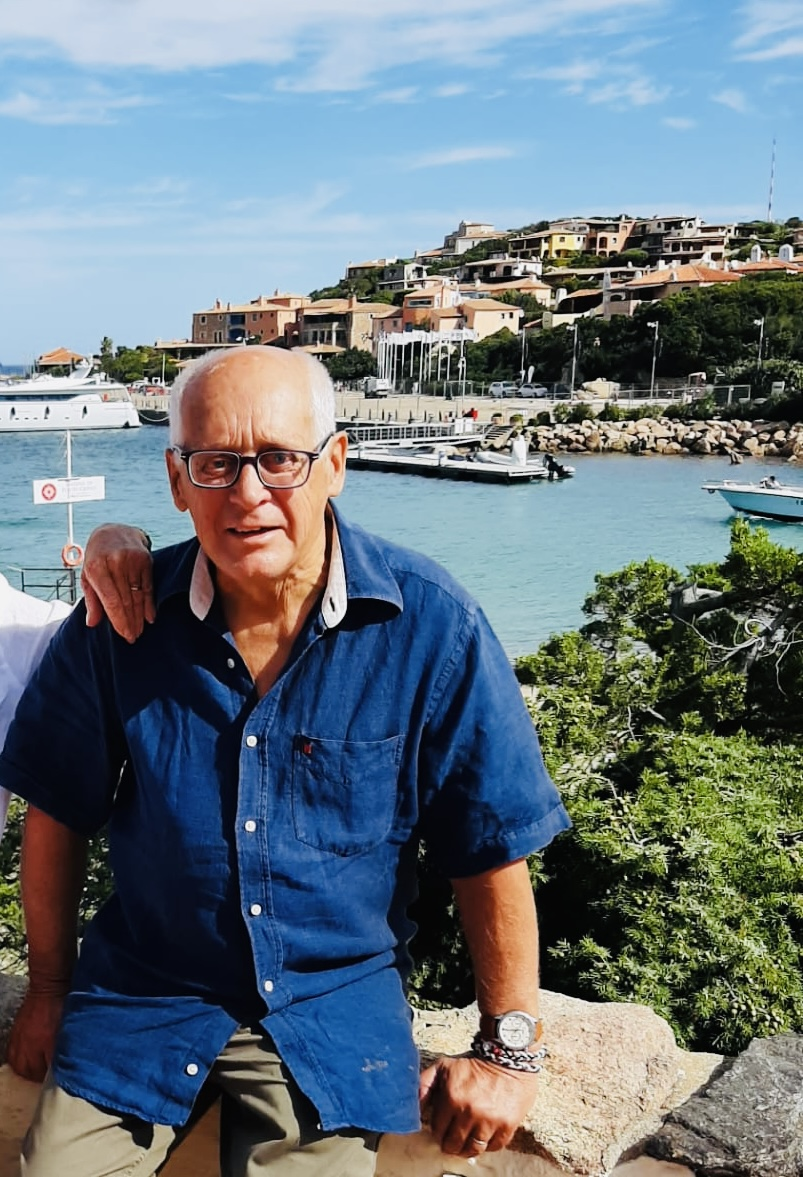
- Claude Sterckx
- Born: 3 July 1944 (age 82); Uccle, Belgium
- Awards: Order of the Ermine (2006)

Academic background
- Education: Université libre de Bruxelles • Université de Haute-Bretagne

Academic work
- Discipline: Celtic studies
- Sub-discipline: Celtic and comparative Indo-European mythology
- Institutions: Université libre de Bruxelles • Faculté Ouverte des Religions et des Humanismes Laïques, Charleroi • Institut des Hautes Études de Belgique
- Main interests: Mythology of the pre-Christian Celts, comparative Indo-European mythology
- Notable works: Taranis, Sucellos et quelques autres (2005)

Claude Sterckx (born 3 July 1944) is a Belgian Celticist. He taught Celtic civilisation at the Université libre de Bruxelles, directed the journal Ollodagos, and headed the Société Belge d'Études Celtiques (Belgian Society for Celtic Studies). His work deals with the mythology of the pre-Christian Celts and its survival in later, mainly medieval, tradition, examined in the light of comparative Indo-European mythology.

== Life and career ==
Sterckx was born in Uccle, near Brussels, on 3 July 1944. He holds a licence in ancient history and a doctorate in philosophy and letters from the Université libre de Bruxelles, and a maîtrise in Celtic studies from the Université de Haute-Bretagne at Rennes.

He taught Celtic civilisation at the Université libre de Bruxelles from 1986 to 2007, latterly as maître d'enseignement. He also lectured at the Institut des Hautes Études de Belgique and was a professor at the Faculté Ouverte des Religions et des Humanismes Laïques in Charleroi.

Sterckx directed Ollodagos, the proceedings of the Société Belge d'Études Celtiques, and headed that society, whose biannual study days supplied the journal. He also chaired the National Fund for Scientific Research contact group 'Études celtologiques et comparatives' and the Comité International pour la Sauvegarde de la Langue Bretonne (International Committee for the Safeguarding of the Breton Language).

== Research ==
Sterckx's research centres on the mythology of the pre-Christian Celts and on its echoes in the later folklore, legend and hagiography of the Celtic-speaking countries, which he reads in the light of comparative Indo-European mythology. His three-volume Taranis, Sucellos et quelques autres (2005) deals with the sovereign god of the Celts from Gaul to Ireland.

== Recognition ==
In 2006 Sterckx received the Order of the Ermine, a Breton cultural distinction awarded by the Institut Culturel de Bretagne to people who have worked for Breton identity and culture.

== Selected publications ==
- La tête et les seins: la mutilation rituelle des ennemis et le concept de l'âme. Saarbrücken: Homo et Religio, 1981. (Forschungen zur Anthropologie und Religionsgeschichte, 6). Reissued as Les mutilations des ennemis chez les Celtes préchrétiens: la tête, les seins, le graal. Paris: L'Harmattan, 2005.
- Éléments de cosmogonie celtique. Brussels: Éditions de l'Université de Bruxelles, 1986. ISBN 2-8004-0900-2.
- Histoire brève de la musique celtique, des origines à nos jours. Plymouth Meeting, Pennsylvania: U.S. ICDBL, 1987. Reissued as Histoire brève de la musique celte, des origines au vingtième siècle. Brussels: SBEC, 2013.
- Les dieux protéens des Celtes et des Indo-Européens. Brussels: SBEC, 1994.
- Dieux d'eau: Apollons celtes et gaulois. Brussels: SBEC, 1996.
- Essai de dictionnaire des dieux, héros, mythes et légendes des Celtes, vol. 1. Brussels: SBEC, 1998.
- Sangliers Père & Fils: rites, mythes et dieux celtes du porc et du sanglier. Brussels: SBEC, 1998.
- Des dieux et des oiseaux: réflexions sur l'ornithomorphisme de quelques dieux celtes. Brussels: SBEC, 2000.
- Taranis, Sucellos et quelques autres: le dieu souverain des Celtes, de la Gaule à l'Irlande, 3 vols. Brussels: SBEC, 2005. (Mémoires de la Société Belge d'Études Celtiques, 22–24).
- Mythologie du monde celte. Paris: Marabout, 2009. ISBN 978-2-501-05410-2.
- Mythes et dieux celtes: essais et études. Paris: L'Harmattan, 2010.
- Histoire, langues et culture des Celtes. Brussels: SBEC, 2011. (Mémoires de la Société Belge d'Études Celtiques, 33).
- with Frédéric Blaive, Le mythe indo-européen du guerrier impie. Paris: L'Harmattan, 2014.
- La neuvième vague, et autres essais sur le légendaire celtique de Bretagne. Marseille: Terre de promesse, 2019.
