= Bodilis Parish close =

Coordinates: 48.5307°N 4.1162°W

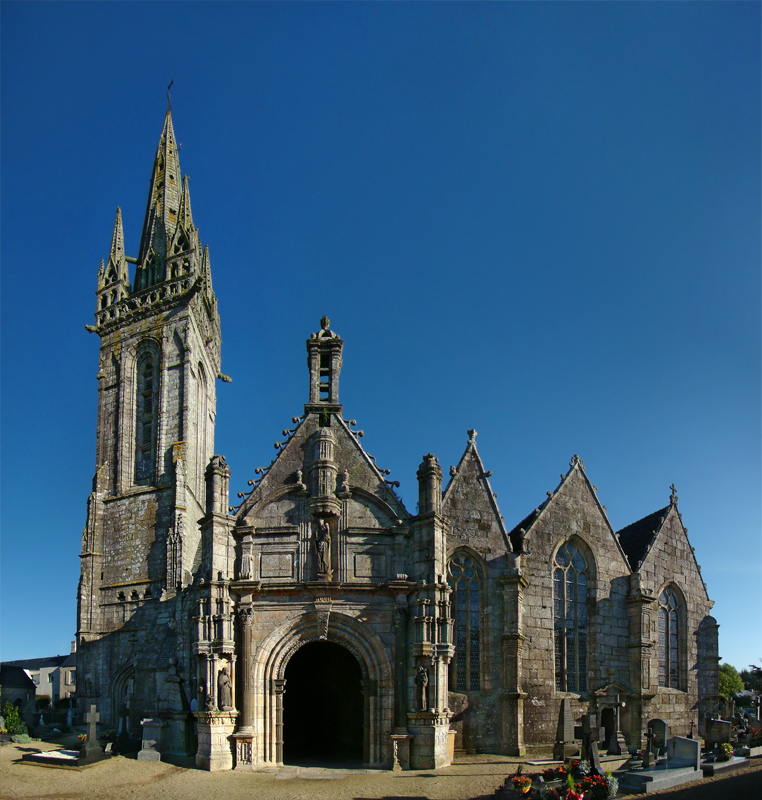
View of Bodilis church

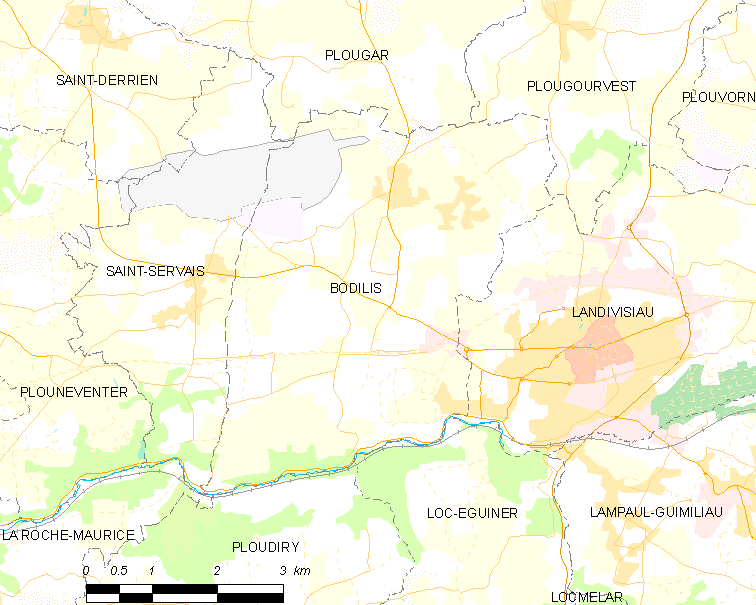
Map showing the location of Bodilis

The Bodilis Parish close (Enclos paroissial) of Bodilis is located in the arrondissement of Morlaix in Finistère department of Brittany in north-western France. Apart from the parish church, the Église Notre-Dame, the enclosure at Bodilis includes a perimeter wall with three entrance gates and a simple crucifixion cross. The ossuary was destroyed in 1825. The church is a listed historical monument since 1910. The choir and central nave date to 1567 and the bell tower was added in 1570. The porch was added in 1601 and the sacristy in 1682. From the beginning of the 16th century, Bodilis' burgeoning linen industry boosted the town's wealth. An important fair was staged there (the fair of Saint Matthew) and there were frequent pilgrimages to the town to secure "pardons" from the Virgin Mary. Much of the wealth generated was channeled into enhancing the parish church and, as a result, it shows elements of Gothic, Renaissance, Classical and Baroque styles. The bell tower porch is of the late Gothic style and is forty metres high. The church also has a 1564 chevet built in the Beaumanoir style.

== The south porch ==
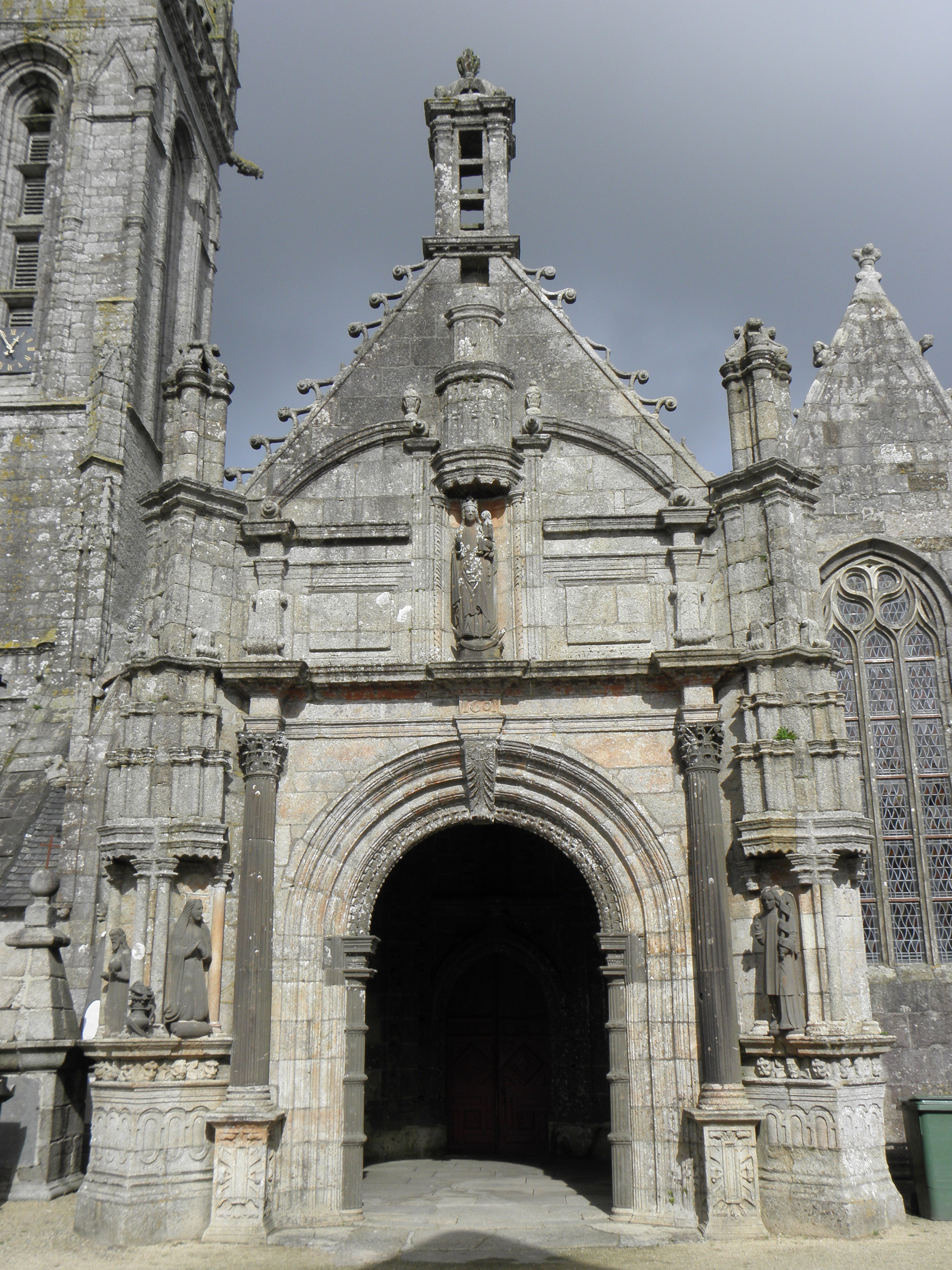
The south porch. Note the statue of the kneeling Virgin Mary on the left and the Archangel Gabriel on the right. A statue of the Virgin Mary with child is positioned in a niche above the arch surmounted by a dais

Built in 1601 this porch is one of the most complete in Léon. The exterior entrance to the porch has a statue of the Virgin Mary with child in a central niche in the gable. Above her is an elaborate dais. Thus she greets visitors to the church dedicated to her. In a niche in the buttress on the left hand side of the porch is a statue of the Virgin Mary. She kneels on a cushion and looks across to the right hand side of the entrance where a statue of the Archangel Gabriel completes the Annunciation scene. Gabriel asks Mary to become the mother of the son of God and Mary raises one hand in a signal of acceptance. Inside the porch are statues in kersanton stone of the apostles, all above a frieze richly decorated with flowers, animals and small caryatids. The porch gives access to a Gothic pointed arch ("arc brisé") around the door which in turn gives access to the church. This arch dates to 1570 and includes, in the tympanum, a Roland Doré statue of Christ giving a blessing. The statue is positioned within a decorated niche surmounted by a Renaissance style dais. He is flanked on each side by five kneeling angels who carry banners, sadly now unreadable. The voussoirs of the arch are lavishly decorated and in the outer rim on one side of the arch are depictions which include Saint Côme holding ointments, the blind Saint Hervé holding a stick with an open book in his hand, a monk, again holding an open book, then Saint Miliau. On the other side are depictions which include Saint Damien with a pot of ointment, Saint Ivo of Kermartin with ermine flecked cloak, Francis of Assisi showing his palms with stigmata and Saint Sebastian pierced with arrows. The buttress on the left side of the porch entrance has a statue depicting Christ holding a terrestrial globe in his left hand. The other hand is broken.

== The sacristy ==
Added to the north side of the church, the sacristy dates to 1682 with polygonal shape and external stairway. The architect, Christophe Kerandel, took the trouble to match the decoration on the buttresses with that on the church.

== Internal decoration ==
The wood carvings throughout the church were restored between 2000 and 2002. Numerous sablières (see note 2 below) can be seen throughout the church. The Chapel of the Rosary in particular has carved heads representing the evangelists and the sablières mix religious and profane subjects so that angels showing Jesus' wounds and a chalice decorated with Jesus' face mix with a carving of a putti gathering grapes and a naked woman lying in a rather lascivious posture. In another scene, a barrel is depicted from which a man on all fours is filling a jug whilst a woman pulls on the tail of a pig as it removes the bung from the barrel. Nearby, as though to warn the viewer of the dangers of over drinking, a huge worm is depicted entering the eye socket of a skull with the words inscribed "Respice finem". The sablières above the pulpit have high relief carvings including a depiction of three horses pulling a plough steered by a farm labourer, a man sowing cereal seeds and a cart loaded with wine barrels. Art historians have suggested these two carvings relate to the eucharist, with the theme of bread and wine.

== The altarpieces ==
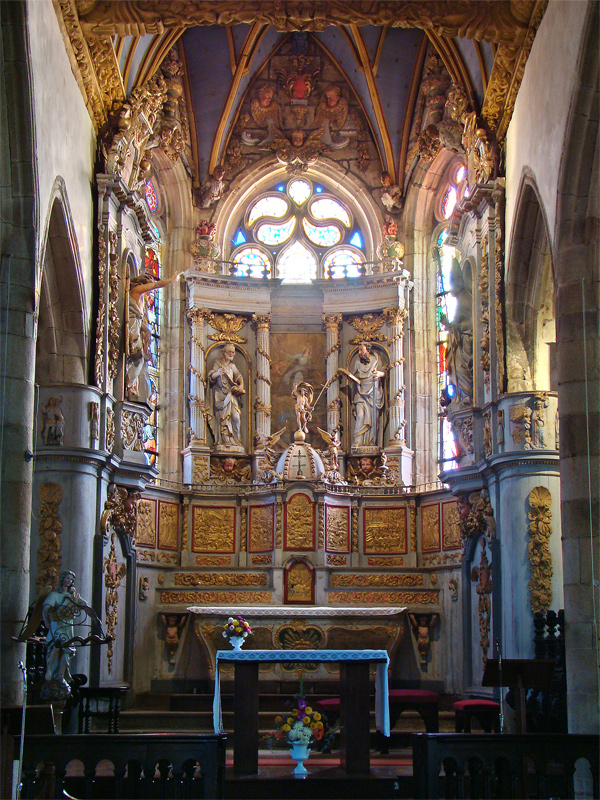
View of the main altar

There are several notable altarpieces in the church, including:

- The "Sainte Famille" altarpiece which dates to 1674 and is attributed to Maurice Le Roux.
- That dedicated to Saint Joachim and Saint Anne with depictions of the bishop Saint Mathurin and Saint James the Greater.
- The "Notre Dame" altarpiece with a stone arch. The altarpiece includes four panels covering episodes in Jesus' life- the nativity, the visit of the three kings, the flight into Egypt and the massacre of the innocents. It also depicts a scene from the visitation and includes statues of Saint Barbara and Saint Elizabeth.
- The master altar dates to 1699 and was sumptuously decorated by Guillaume Lerrel. The altar panels depict scenes from both Old and New Testaments and there are two tabernacles, the larger depicting Isaac's sacrifice and the smaller one, the events surrounding Emmaüs.
- The John the Baptist altarpiece. This has four panels with depictions of three evangelists and Saint Peter and Saint Paul. It also includes statues of Saint Eloi and Saint Claire.
- The "Rosary" altarpiece. In the central scene is a depiction of the Virgin Mary giving the rosary to Saint Dominic and Saint Catherine of Sienna. Around this are a series of medallions covering aspects of the Virgin Mary's life.

== The baptistry and the pulpit ==
The pulpit dates to 1744 and was donated to the church by François de Lesquelen along with the confessional boxes. The stone baptismal font dates to the 16th century and has an octagonal baldachin with a dome said to have been inspired by the clock tower at the Notre Dame de Berven chapel in Plouzévédé. The font is decorated with statues in kersanton which are attributed to Roland Doré and are of Matthew the Evangelist, Mark the Evangelist, the Holy Father holding Jesus in his arms, Saint Gregory the Grand Pope, Saint John and Saint Ambrose the vicar of Milan.

== The statuary ==
The church is rich in statues dating from the 16th and 17th century including a statue in the nave of Saint Catherine with a broken wheel (the instrument of her martyrdom), Saint Margaret with dragon, John the Evangelist with a chalice and Saint Francis displaying the stigmata. In the south aisle area there is a statue of Saint Dominic with the Virgin Mary and child and in the choir area is a statue of an angel said to have been inspired by Bernin.

== See also ==
- Culture of France
- French architecture
- History of France
- Religion in France
- Roman Catholicism in France

== Notes ==
Note 1. Bodilis celebrates its "pardon" on 15 August each year.

Note 2. A sablière is a wooden horizontal beam positioned between a church wall and the roof or a church wall and the floor. It is often interspersed with carved wooden blocks ("blochets") mostly depicting heads and where the beam meets a rafter is a carved "engoulant".

== Gallery of images ==
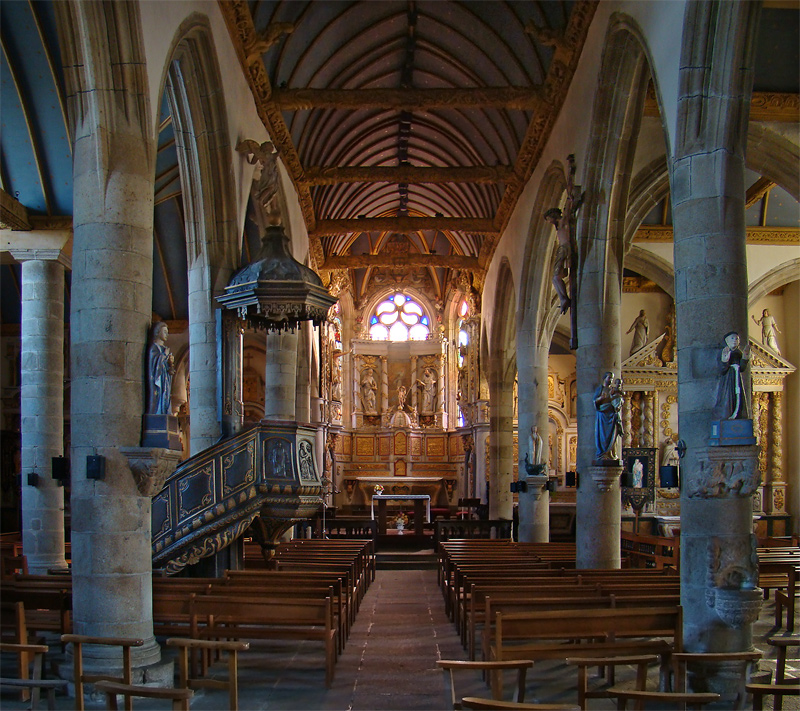
Looking along the nave towards the choir

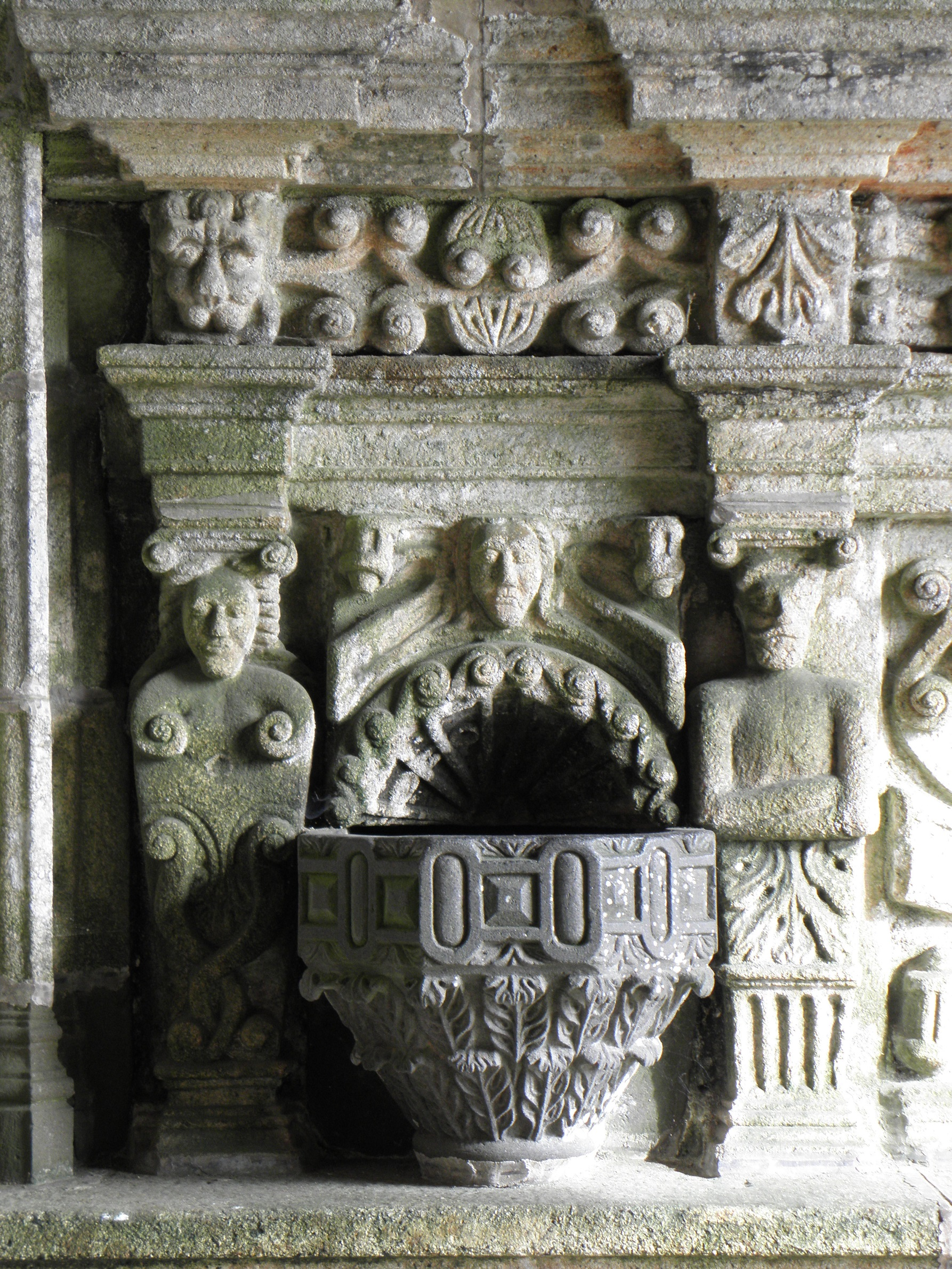
A stoup in the frieze below the statues of the apostles in the south porch interior

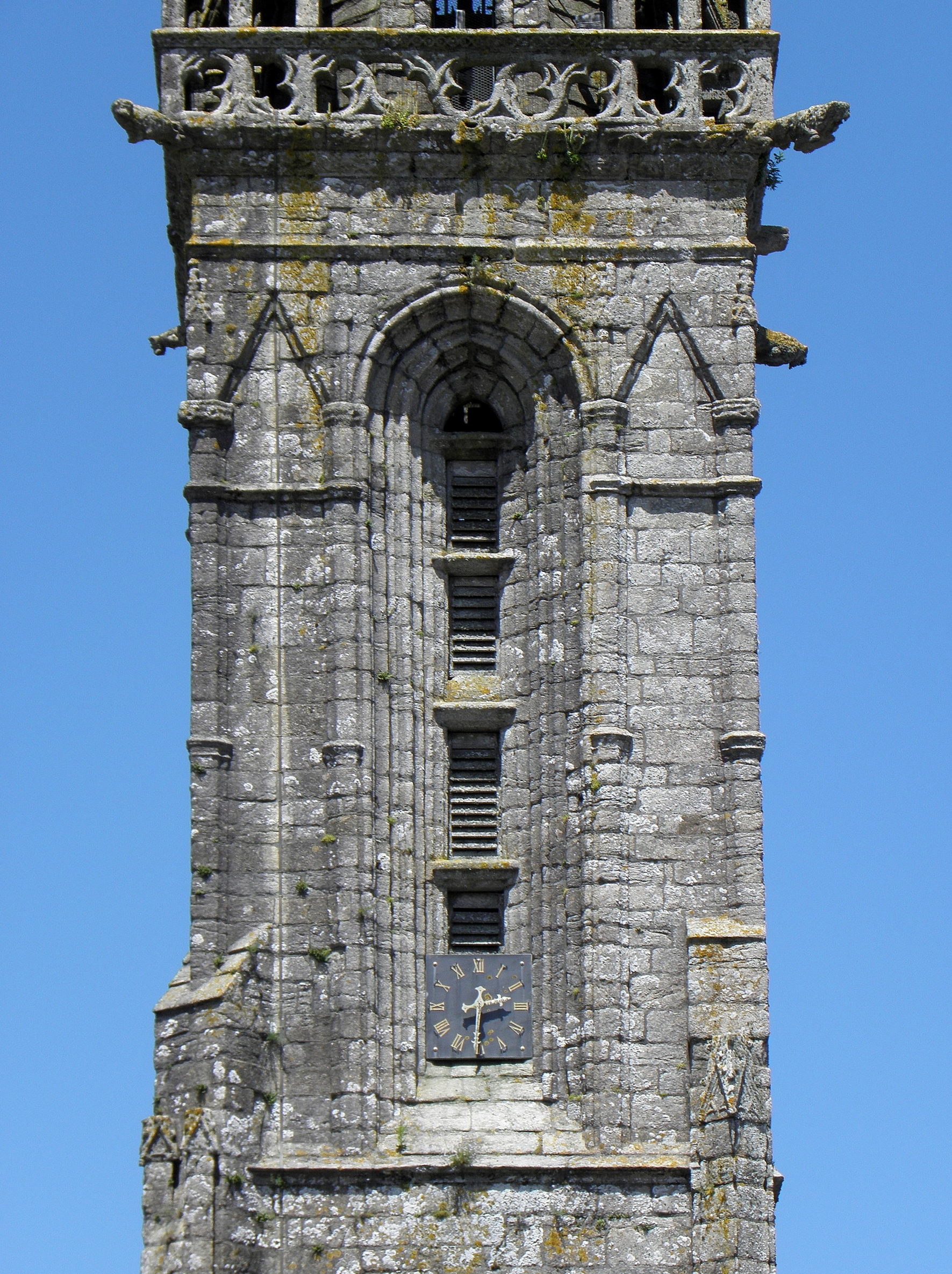
View of the 1570 bell tower. The bell tower has four arcades and was the last Gothic bell tower to be built in Léon

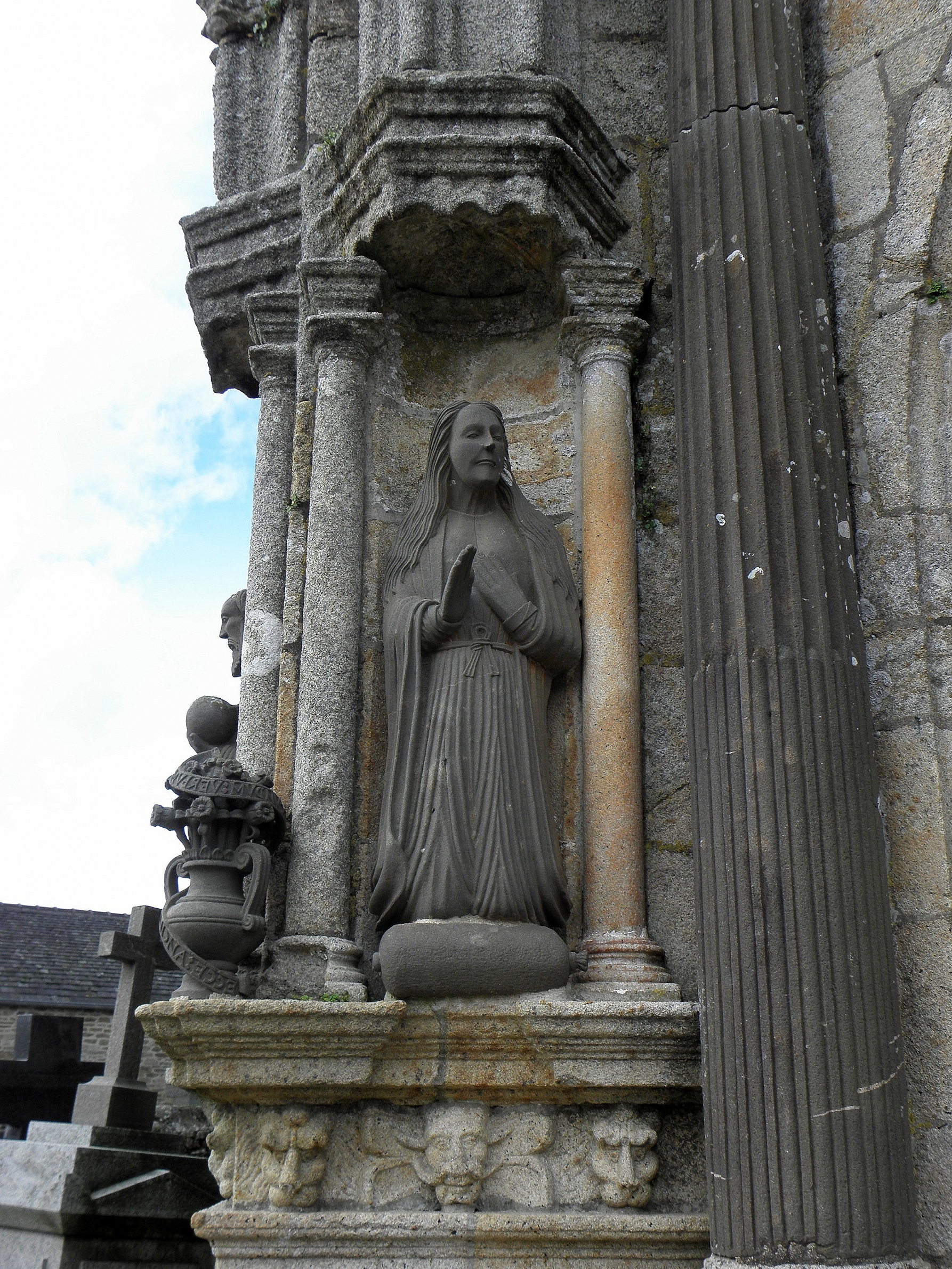
The kneeling Virgin Mary looks across to Gabriel. This sculpture is by Roland Doré. Around the vase containing lilies, is a banner reading "ECCE:ANCILLA:D(OMI)NI:FIAT:MIHI: SECVNDVM:VERBVM:TVVM"

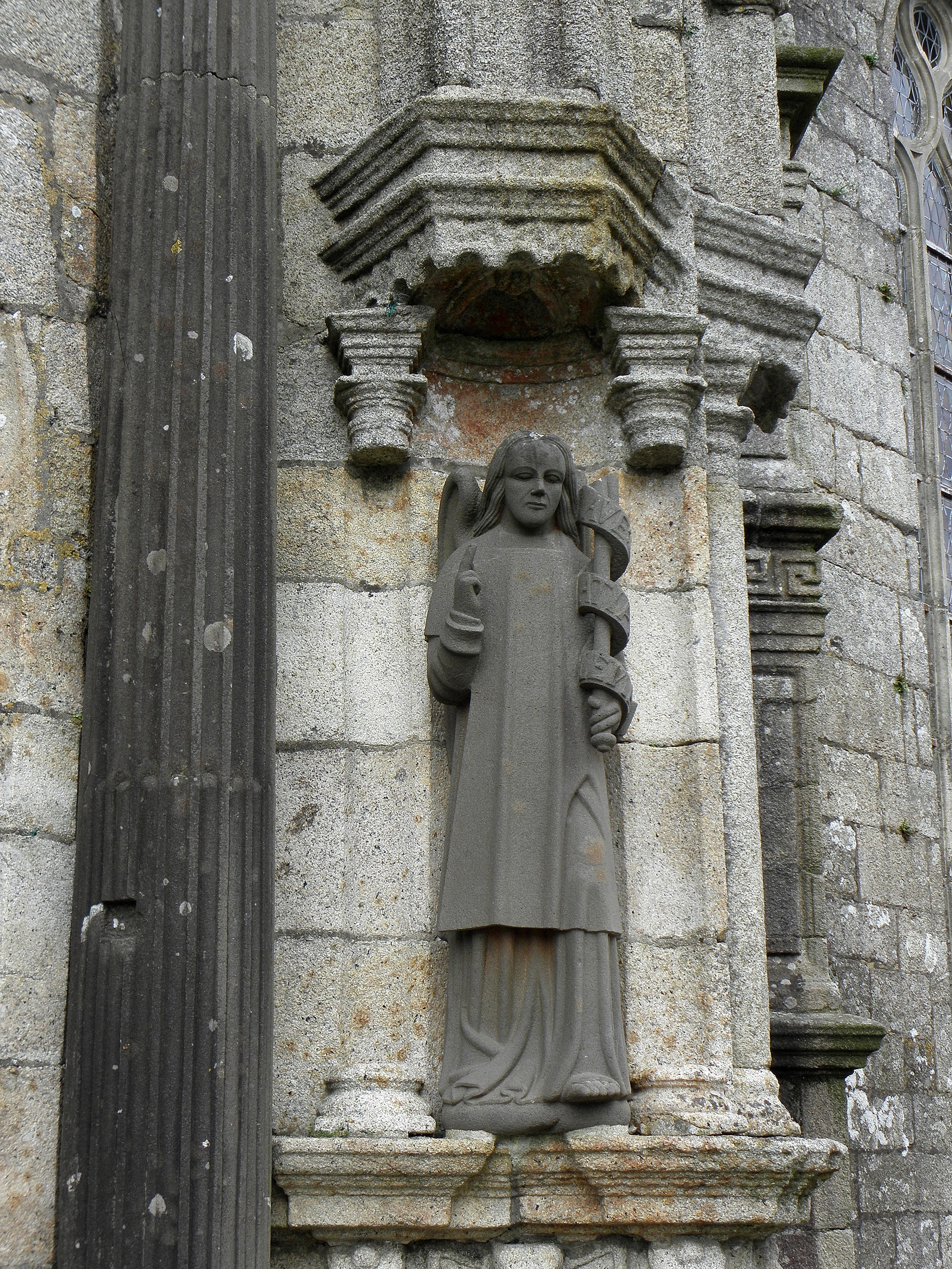
The archangel Gabriel

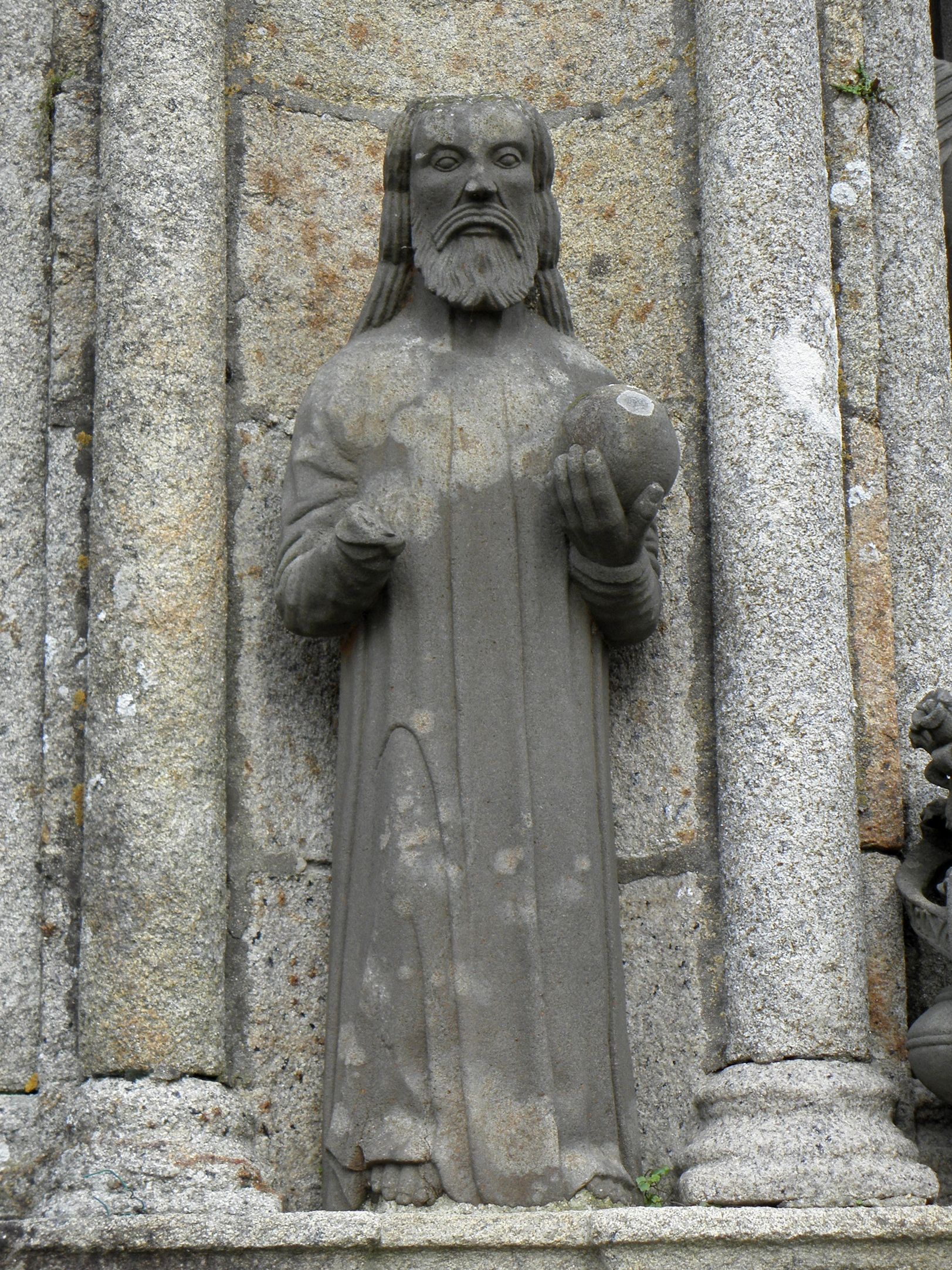
"Christ the redeemer". A Roland Doré sculpture

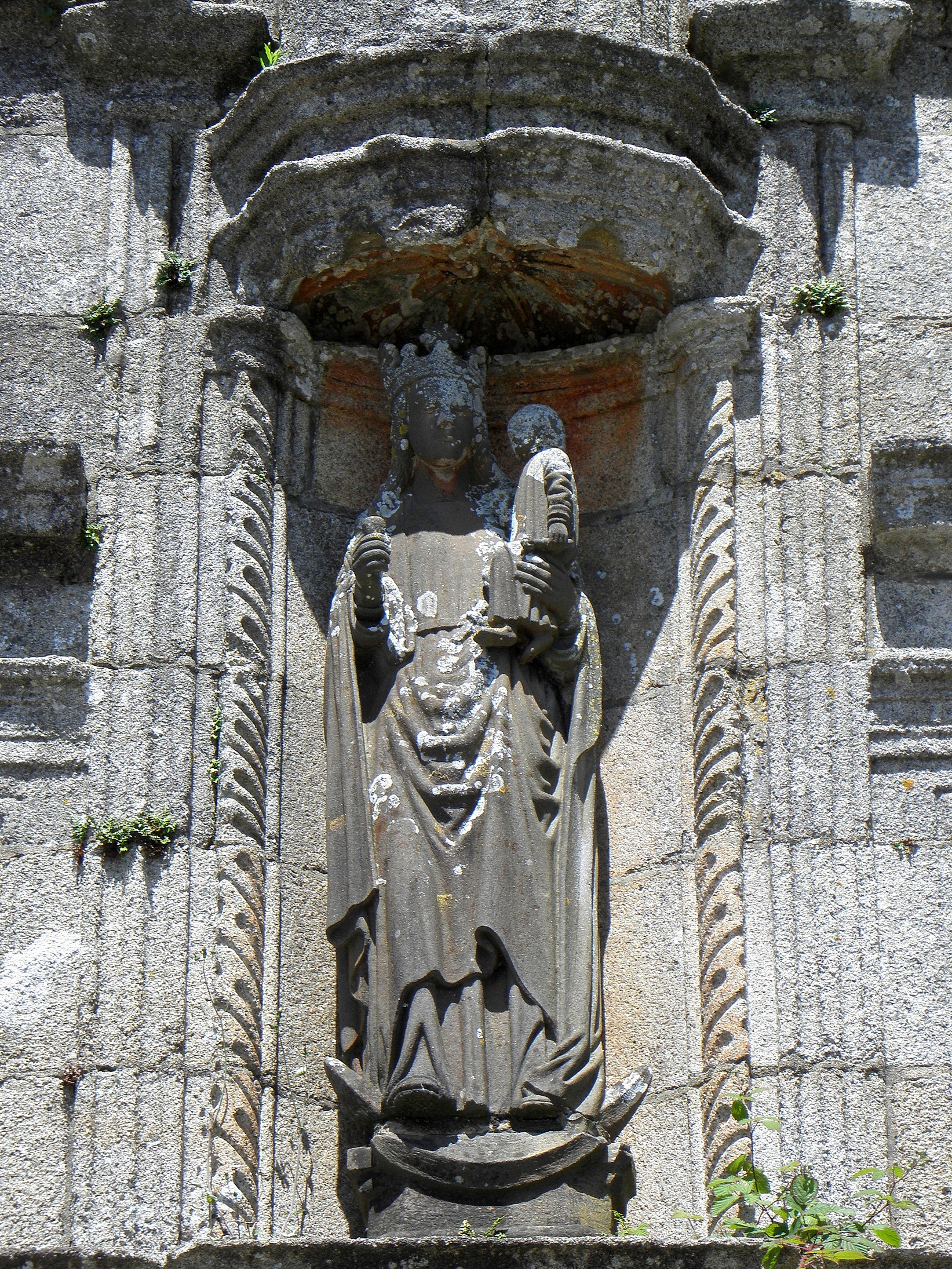
The Virgin Mary with child, above the entrance to the south porch

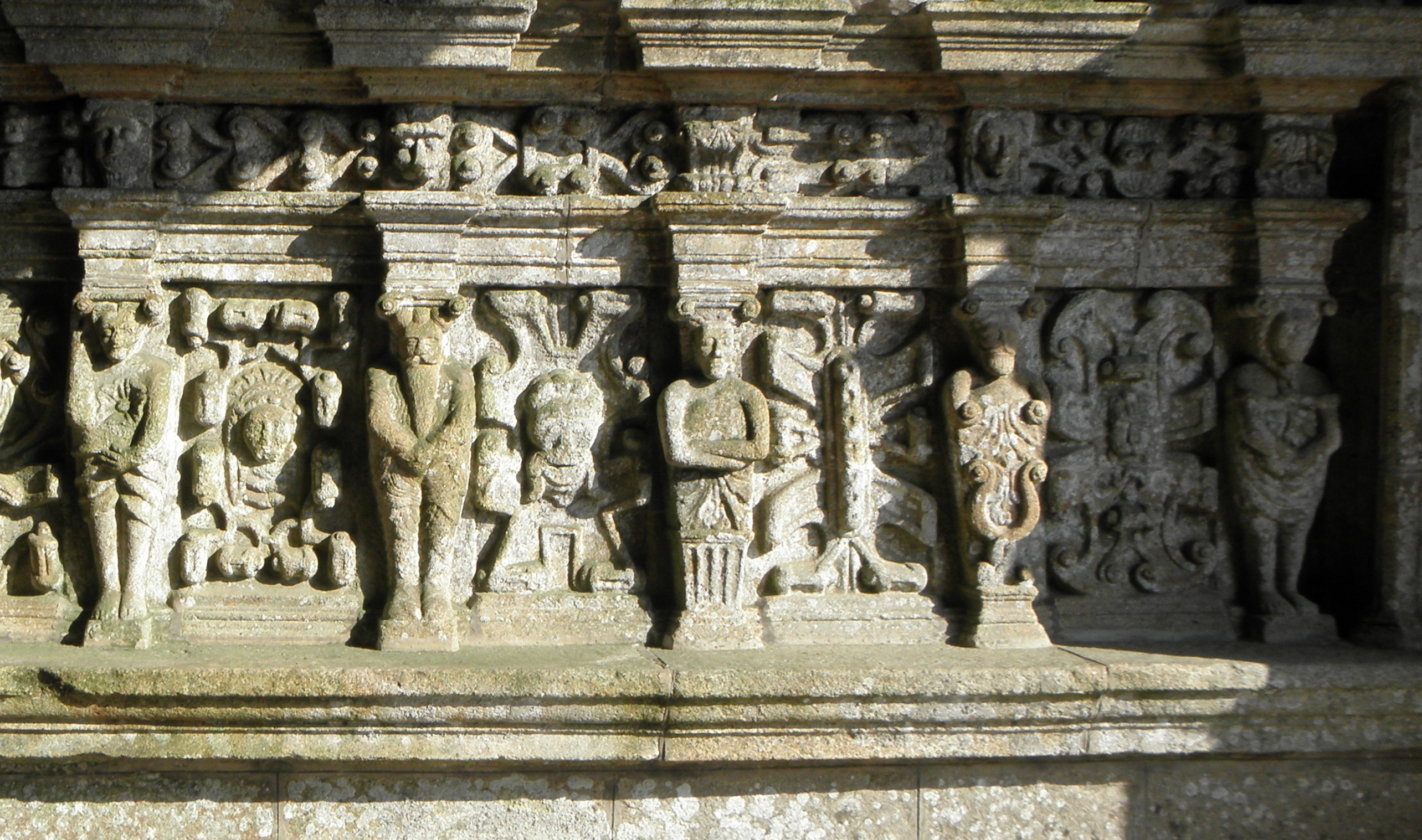
Part of the ornate frieze under the statues of the apostles in the south porch interior

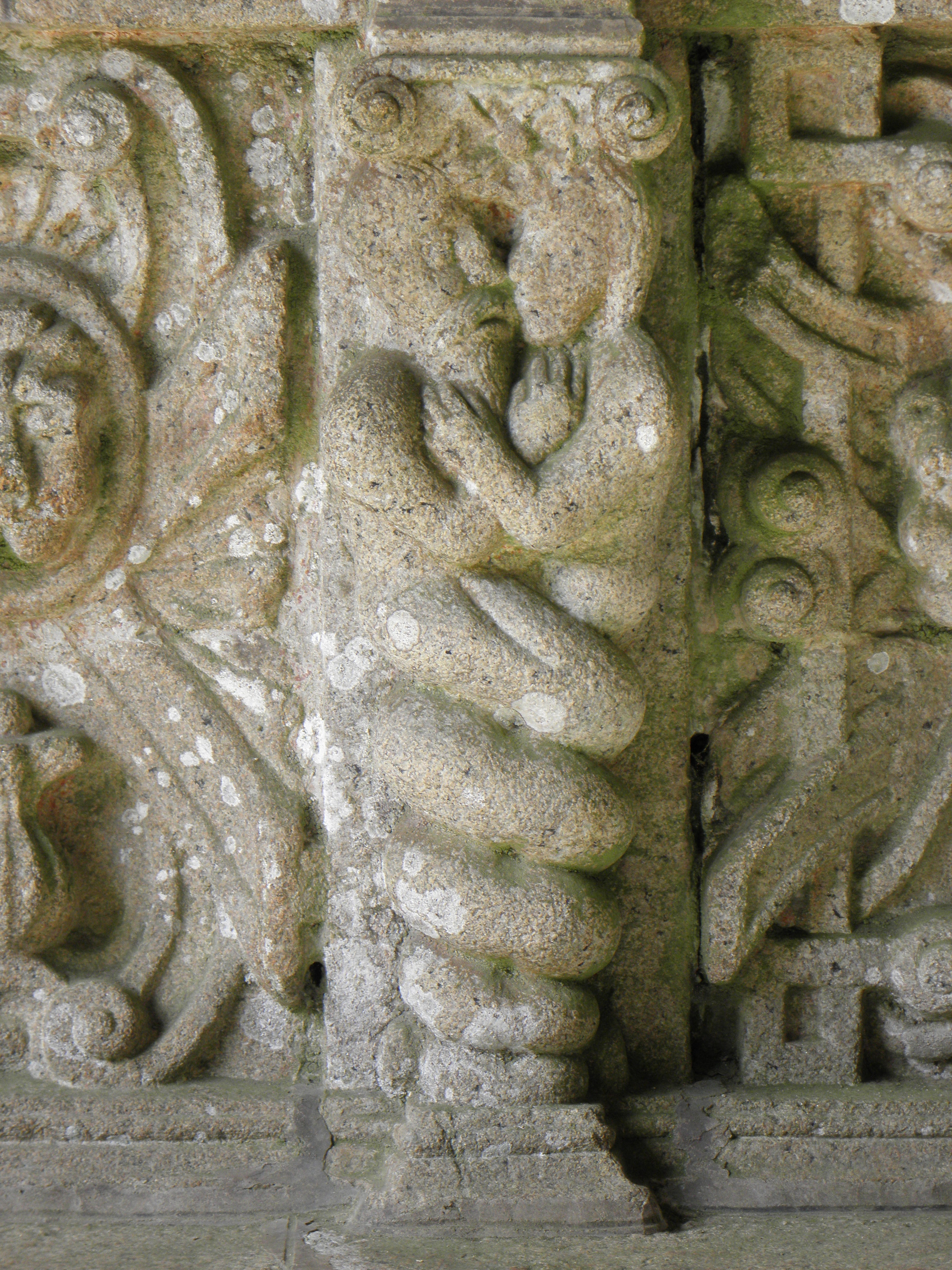
A close-up of the frieze mentioned above. A man and a woman are entwined

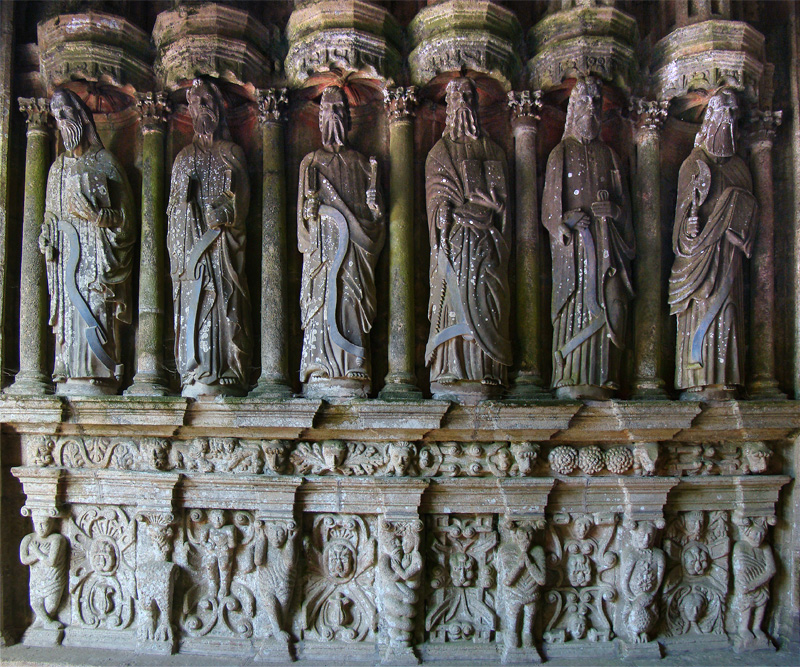
Some of the statues of the apostles in the south porch interior
