= Ronan Huon =

French writer and editor (1922–2003)

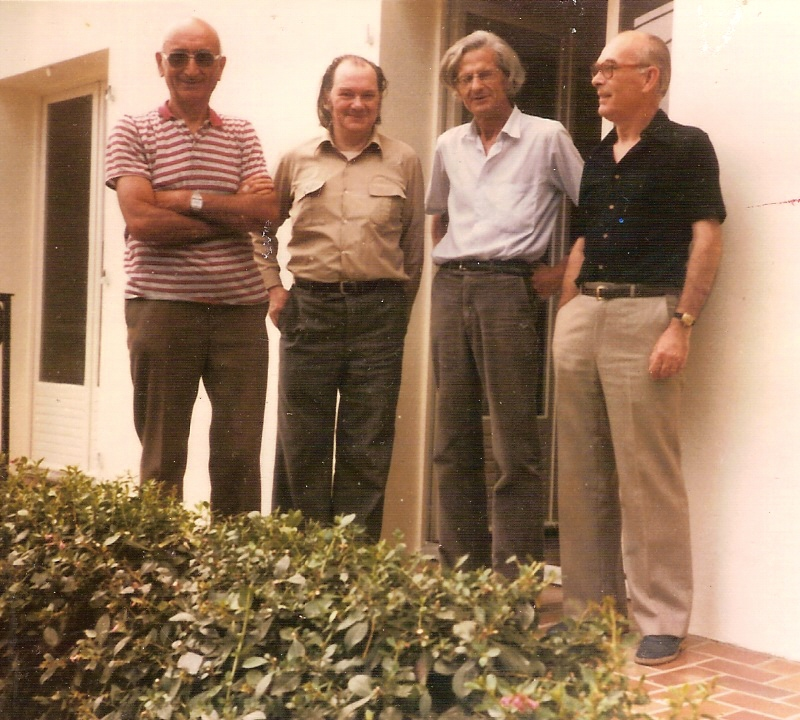
Reunion of Al Liam colleagues; Huon is on the right

Ronan Huon, also called René Huon (3 August 1922 in Saint-Omer, Pas-de-Calais – 18 October 2003, Brest), was a Breton language writer and editor. He was director and chief editor of the magazine Al Liamm for over 50 years. His work has been recognized for its contribution to Breton literature.

== Early life ==
Huon's parents were from Trégor but his first language was French. He began to learn Breton (Brezhoneg) when he was 17 years old. He was educated at Lannion and at the University of Rennes, where he earned a degree in English and a diploma of Celtic studies, after a year in Swansea, Wales.

He returned from Britain in 1949, and was a high school teacher of English at Brest, where he remained until the end of his life. He had learned the rudiments of Welsh and admired the educational system which allowed the teaching of Welsh, unlike the centralized monolingual system in France.

== Writer and editor ==
In 1945, along with Pol Le Gourrierec, he founded the magazine, Tír na nÓg (Land of the Young). This took the place of a previous Breton-language review, Gwalarn, that had run for 19 years after being launched by Roparz Hemon in 1925. In 1948, he co-founded the review magazine, Al Liamm (The Link); these magazines merged in 1949, continuing as Al Liamm. He directed and edited this review for about half a century. He also directed Éditions Al Liamm, a Breton book publisher.

Al Liamm magazine and the some 200 book titles are credited with potentially saving Breton from extinction. They represent the most durable publishing activity in Breton since 1945, stimulating many new journals since the 1960s. From 1985 to 1997, he was President of the Association des Editeurs de Bretagne, working with new authors to increase the availability of books in Breton. In 2000, the Al Liamm imprint was taken over by another publisher, An Here.

Huon completed and updated Roparz Hemon's Breton-French/French-Breton dictionary, which sold more than 100,000 copies.

As a writer, he had a collection of poems: Evidon Va-Unan (For Myself), and two collections of short stories: An Irin Glas (The Sloes or The Blackthorn) and Ur Vouezh Er Vorenn (A Voice in the Mist). He also translated from Welsh, particularly the short stories of Kate Roberts, and English. He wrote or collaborated as editor learning books for Breton, Breton grammar and a 1984 book surveying recent Breton writing.

== Publications ==
- Evidon Va-Unan (For Myself), published by Al Liamm, Brest, 1955 and 1976 (poems)
- An Irin Glas (sources give this as The Green Shoes" or as "Plums), published by Al Liamm, Brest, 1966 and 1971 (short stories)
- Ur Vouezh Er Vorenn (A Voice in the Mist), published by Al Liamm, Brest, 1980 (short stories)

== Award ==
In 1992, he received the Ordre de l'Hermine award for his life's labours.

== Family ==
Huon was married to Elen Ar Meliner. They had four sons, one of whom, Tudual Huon, took his place at the head of the magazine.
