= Bodilis =

Bodilis Bodiliz
- Commune
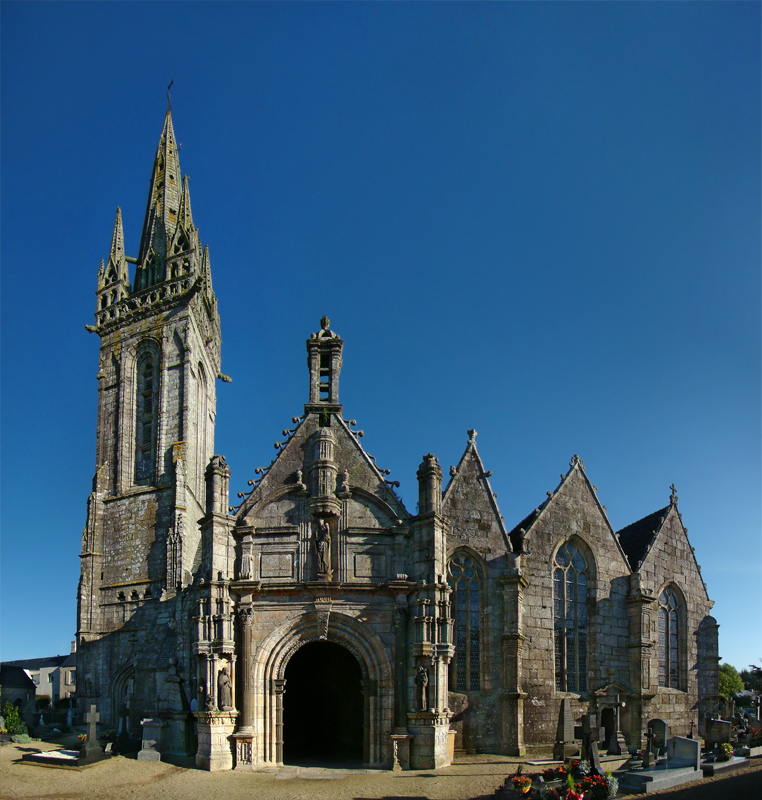
- Notre-Dame church

- Coat of arms
- Location of Bodilis
- Location within France Location within Brittany
- Coordinates: 48°31′51″N 4°06′56″W
- Country: France
- Region: Brittany
- Department: Finistère
- Arrondissement: Morlaix
- Canton: Landivisiau
- Intercommunality: Pays de Landivisiau

Government
  - Mayor (2020–2026): Guy Guéguen
- Area^{1}: 20.08 km^{2} (7.75 sq mi)
- Highest elevation: 119 m (390 ft)
- Lowest elevation: 24 m (79 ft)
- Population (2023): 1,723
  - Density: 85.81/km^{2} (222.2/sq mi)
- Time zone: UTC+01:00 (CET)
  - Summer (DST): UTC+02:00 (CEST)
- INSEE/Postal code: 29010 /29400
- ^{1} French Land Register data, which excludes lakes, ponds, glaciers > 1 km^{2} (0.386 sq mi or 247 acres) and river estuaries.

Bodilis (French pronunciation: [bɔdilis]; Breton: Bodiliz) is a commune in the Finistère department of Brittany in north-western France.

== Population ==
Inhabitants of Bodilis are called Bodilisiens in French.

== Sights ==
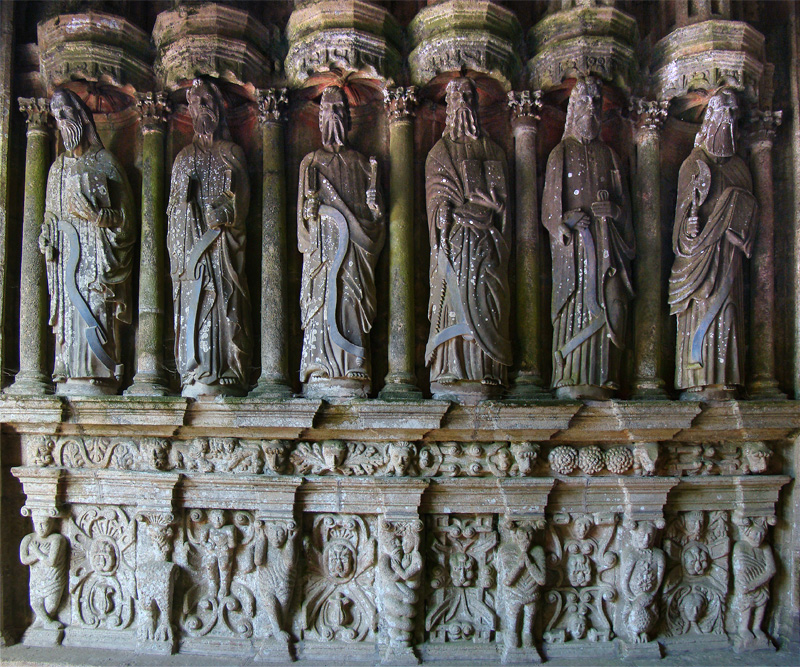
Notre-Dame Church,
Porch left side

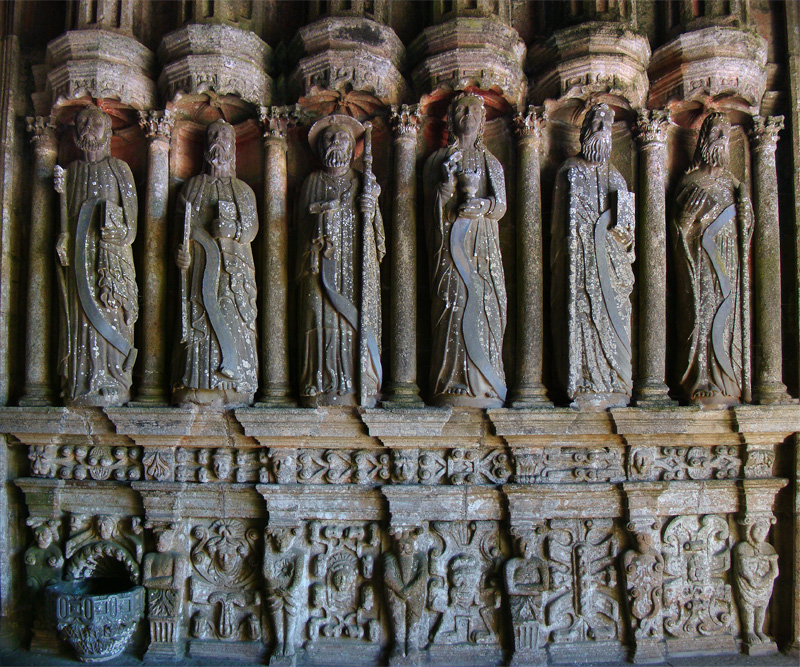
Notre-Dame Church,
Porch right side

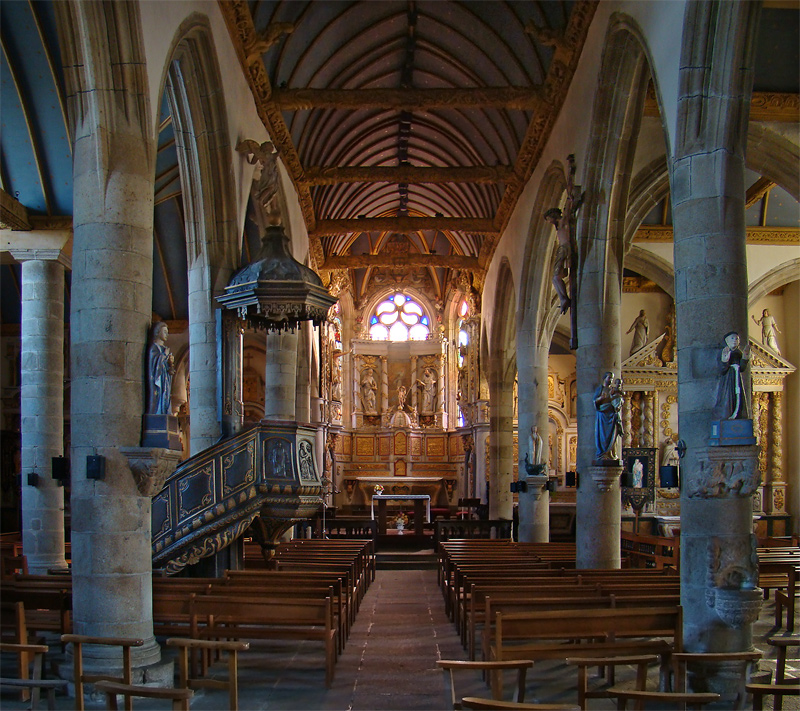
Notre-Dame Church,
Nave and choir

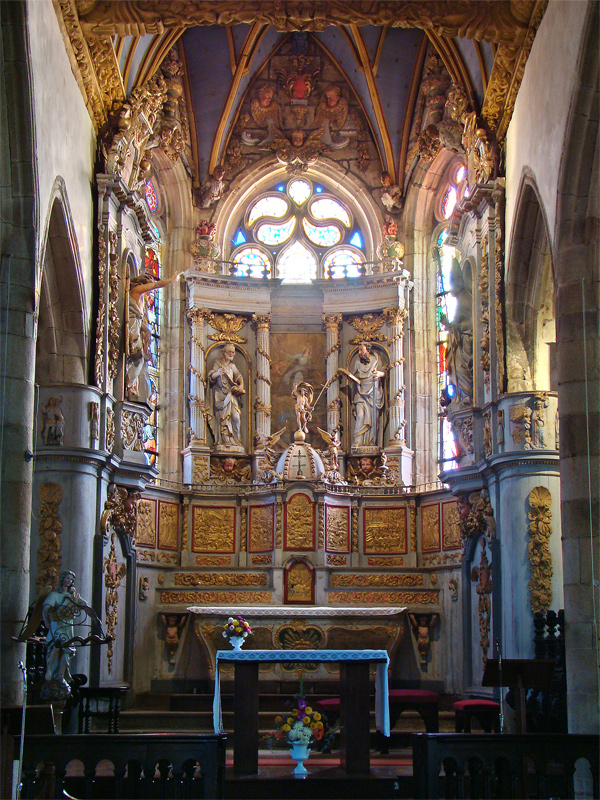
Notre-Dame Church,
Main altar

== See also ==
- Communes of the Finistère department
- Roland Doré sculptor
- Bodilis Parish close
- List of the works of the Maître de Plougastel
