= Pierre-Roland Giot =

- Born: 23 September 1919; Carolles
- Died: January 2002
- Alma mater: University of Rennes
- Employer: Museum of Prehistory of Penmarch (1947–1986); French National Centre for Scientific Research (1943–1986); Rennes 2 University; University of Rennes 1
- Awards: Order of the Ermine (1988); Commander of the French Order of Academic Palms; Chevalier des Arts et des Lettres; CNRS silver medal (1975)

Pierre-Roland Giot (September 23, 1919 – January 4, 2002) was a French anthropologist, archaeologist and geologist.
