= Maurice Le Lannou =

French geographer

Maurice Le Lannou (8 May 1906 – 2 July 1992) was a French geographer. He was elected to the Académie des sciences morales et politiques in 1975. An edition of the Revue de géographie de Lyon was dedicated to him in 1993.
