= René Abjean =

Contemporary Breton composer

René Abjean (born 22 November 1937) is a French composer associated with Breton revivalist choral music.

== Life ==
Born in Brest, René Abjean made his début as a musician in the choir of Plouguerneau in 1953. At age 17, he created his first vocal work as part of a choral group Ar Baganiz, a precursor of the Breton revivalism of An Triskell, for which he made many arrangements. He co-founded the Cercle Breton de Brest, and organised the Festival International des Cornemuses at Brest from 1969.

In 1974, he published a monograph on Breton music, wrote for several journals and contributed the chapter on Breton music in L'Histoire littéraire et culturelle de la Bretagne. In 1975, he took over the leadership of the Ploudalmézeau choir, and in 1977 of that at Le Folgoët. These were later reconstituted as the "Ensemble Choral du Bout du Monde", which he led until he passed it to Jo Le Gad in 1988.

In 1977, with Pierre-Yves Moign, he founded the "Centre Breton d'Art Populaire" in Brest, over which he presided from 1979 to 1981; he was also associated with the creation of Radio Bretagne Ouest (Radio Breizh Izel). He was a member of the New York Academy of Sciences from 1997 to 1999. He was decorated with the Order of the Ermine. He is married to Marie Kermarec.

== Compositions ==
Abjean has written numerous sacred and secular choral works, often setting the Breton language, such as the Missa Keltia in 1975, the cantatas Ar Marc’h Dall in 1979, War Varc’h d’ar Mor in 1987 and Kan evit ar Peoc’h in 1989. He has also arranged sea shanties. He regularly works with the Chœur d'Hommes Mouezh Paotred Breizh, created in 1993 by his friend Jean-Marie Airault. 1999 saw the first performance of the cantata Une Ville vers la mer to words by Heather Dohollau; in 2000 he wrote with Christian Desbordes a cantata for the millennium, Kalon ar Bed to words by Job an Irien. The cantata Liñvadenn Ker Is was created for the 50th anniversary of the "Fédération Kendalc’h". His 2004 cantata for the male choir "Mouezh Paotred Breizh", Ce Pays vers la mer, Bro ar mor braz, this land and the sea was recorded in 2005 and distributed by Coop Breizh at Spézet.
