= Leuhan =

Leuhan Leuc'han
- Commune
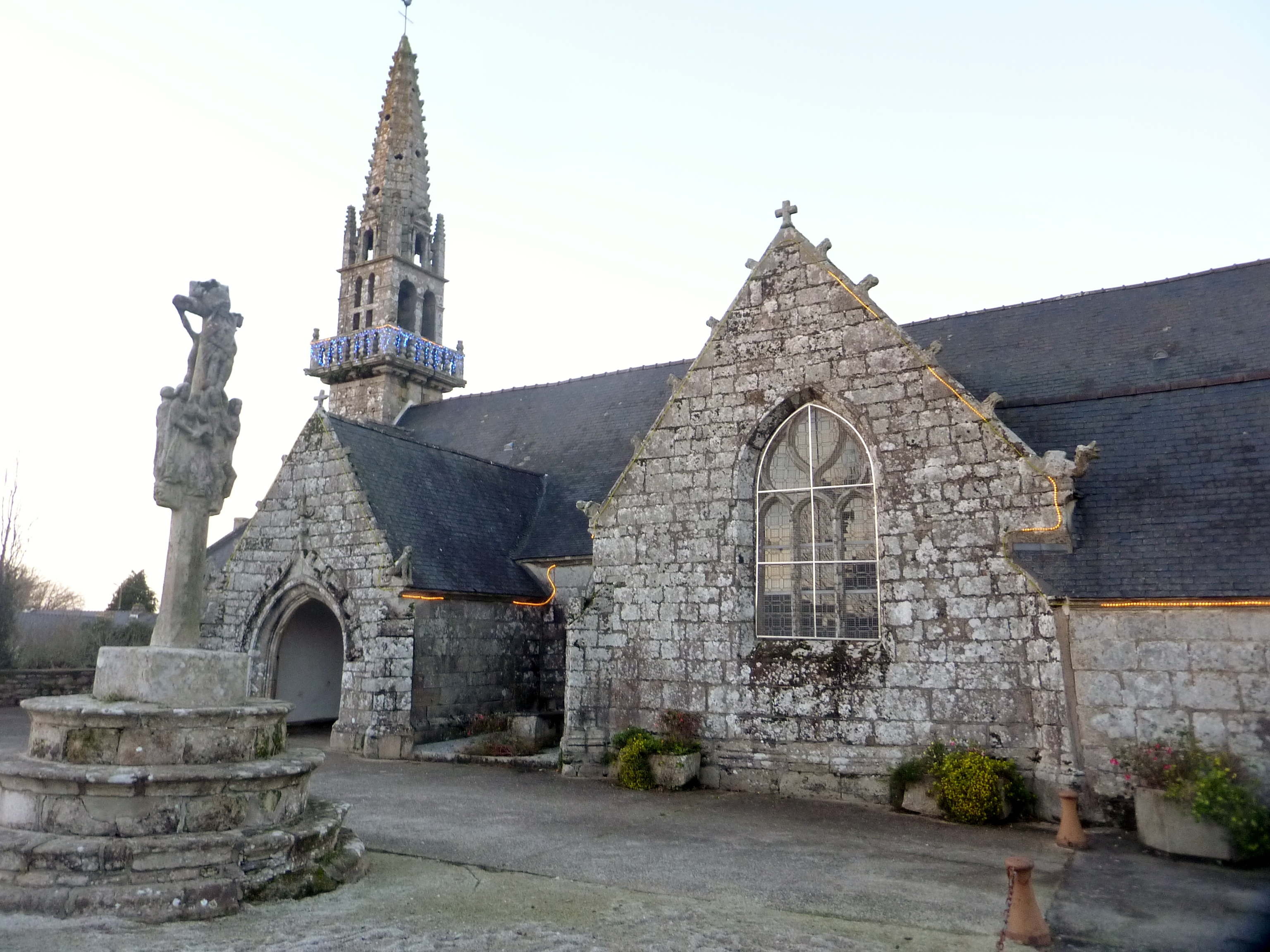
- The parish church of Saint-Théleau.

- Coat of arms
- Location of Leuhan
- Location within France Location within Brittany
- Coordinates: 48°06′00″N 3°46′59″W
- Country: France
- Region: Brittany
- Department: Finistère
- Arrondissement: Châteaulin
- Canton: Briec
- Intercommunality: Haute Cornouaille

Government
  - Mayor (2020–2026): Michel Le Roux
- Area^{1}: 32.75 km^{2} (12.64 sq mi)
- Highest elevation: 246 m (807 ft)
- Lowest elevation: 97 m (318 ft)
- Population (2023): 846
  - Density: 25.8/km^{2} (66.9/sq mi)
- Time zone: UTC+01:00 (CET)
  - Summer (DST): UTC+02:00 (CEST)
- INSEE/Postal code: 29125 /29390
- ^{1} French Land Register data, which excludes lakes, ponds, glaciers > 1 km^{2} (0.386 sq mi or 247 acres) and river estuaries.

Leuhan (French pronunciation: [løɑ̃]; Breton: Leuc'han) is a commune in the Finistère department of Brittany in north-western France.

== Population ==
Inhabitants of Leuhan are called in French Leuhannais.

Historical population

Year	Pop.	±% p.a.
1793	1,219	—
1800	1,010	−2.65%
1806	1,130	+1.89%
1821	1,216	+0.49%
1831	1,358	+1.11%
1836	1,488	+1.85%
1841	1,418	−0.96%
1846	1,545	+1.73%
1851	1,524	−0.27%
1856	1,427	−1.31%
1861	1,461	+0.47%
1866	1,533	+0.97%
1872	1,561	+0.30%
1876	1,616	+0.87%
1881	1,640	+0.30%
1886	1,722	+0.98%
1891	1,682	−0.47%
1896	1,764	+0.96%
1901	1,855	+1.01%

Year	Pop.	±% p.a.
1906	1,912	+0.61%
1911	1,933	+0.22%
1921	1,825	−0.57%
1926	1,760	−0.72%
1931	1,667	−1.08%
1936	1,606	−0.74%
1946	1,554	−0.33%
1954	1,529	−0.20%
1962	1,430	−0.83%
1968	1,281	−1.82%
1975	1,043	−2.89%
1982	932	−1.59%
1990	794	−1.98%
1999	754	−0.57%
2007	778	+0.39%
2012	789	+0.28%
2017	819	+0.75%
2023	846	+0.54%

Source: EHESS and INSEE (1968-2023)

== Map ==
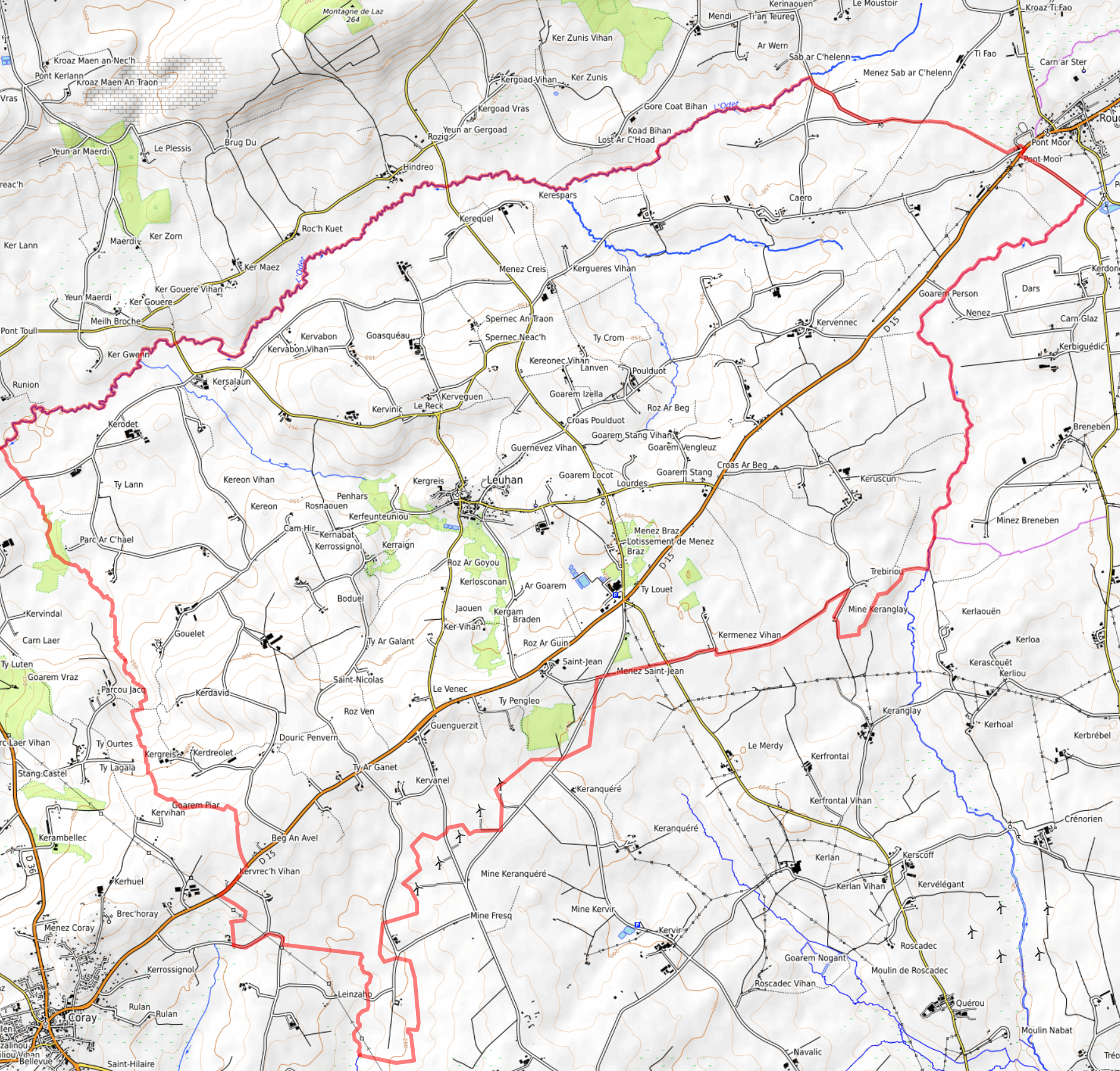
Topographic map

== See also ==
- Communes of the Finistère department
