= Raffig Tullou =

Raffig Tullou (born Raphaël Jean-Baptiste Joseph Tulou), alias Neven Lewarc’h (6 January 1909 in Mordelles – 16 January 1990 in Saint-Herblain) was a Breton sculptor and set designer. His works included modern Celto-Breton furnishing art, wood carvings, stone carvings, and restoration of historical buildings.

== Life ==
Tullou came to prominence as a member of the Breton artistic movement Seiz Breur, and attempted to adapt his style to merge classical and Breton regional traditions.

Like other members of the group, he was also involved in Breton nationalist politics. Following the split in the Breton Autonomist Party, in 1934, Tullou, Gestalen, Francis Bayer du Kern, Goulven Mazéas and Morvan Marchal created the Breton Federalist Movement, which sought Breton federal autonomy within France. This was set up because of the creation of the extremist Breton National Party, which had pro-Nazi sympathies. Nevertheless, during World War II, he reported for L'Heure Bretonne, the newspaper of the BNP.

In 1944, he became the last Secretary General of Seiz Breur, following the resignation of René-Yves Creston.

=== Neo-druidism ===
In the 1930s Tullou turned his attention towards druidic studies. In 1936, he, Morvan Marchal, and Francis Bayer du Kern founded Kredenn Geltiek Hollvedel (Worldwide Celtic Beliefs), also known as Kevanvod Tud Donn and Dêua Ana. In addition, he also founded a journal about druidic studies and philosophy called Kad (combat). During World War II, the journal changed its name to become Nemeton (sanctuary). Today, it is known as Ialon-Kad-Nemeton.

=== Post-War ===
In 1954, he founded Koun Breizh (Remember Bretons), to promote Breton artistic heritage and Breton administrative organizations. Through the movement he sought to commemorate Breton national heroes, and was responsible for the statue of Nominoë, the first independent Duke of Brittany, at Bains-sur-Oust. He also designed the commemorative plaque for the 18th century Breton rebel Marquis de Pontcallec in the Place du Bouffay, in Nantes.

In 1966, he created Skoed (The Shield) to be the official newspaper of Koun Breizh.

==== Raffig Tullou has also invested in the restoration of sculptures ====
- Restoration of the bronze group entitled For the flag due to Georges Bareau, group from the War Memorial of 1870 in Nantes.
- Restoration of the plaster statue of Alain Barbetorte, a monumental work by the sculptor Amédée Ménard, which having been removed from the prefecture of Nantes where it has been enthroned for a century, was vandalized in the courtyard of the castle of the Dukes of Brittany where it had been relegated.
