= Breton Federalist League =

The Breton Federalist League (French: Ligue fédéraliste de Bretagne; Breton: Kevread Vreizh Kevreadel) was a short-lived Breton political party in the 1930s. A new organization with the same name was created in the 21st century.

== Origin ==
At its congress on April 11, 1931, the Breton Autonomist Party broke up under the differences between the federalist and nationalist factions. Faced with the formation of the separatist Breton National Party, the federalists Maurice Duhamel, Morvan Marchal, Yann-Morvan Gefflot, Goulven Mazéas, René-Yves Creston and others, founded the Breton Federalist League.

== Aims ==
Its emblem was the Hevoud (a form of "Celtic" swastika). The League's principal publication was Federal Brittany (Breiz kevredel), founded in 1931 by Morvan Marchal, which was a "leftist" variant of the quasi-fascistic positions espoused by Breiz Atao.

In the first issue of this journal, Goulven Mazéas wrote:

the truth is that our Masters rip apart piece by piece our sense of who we are in order to fill us with a burning love for an alleged fatherland [France], a patriotic cloak already adopted by those who ignore their motherland... we perhaps disavowed an effective nationality to adopt a fictitious nationality to which our blood, our race are completely foreign. (November 1931).

The League was short lived. It was dissolved in 1934 to be replaced by the Breton Federalist Movement which was joined by Morvan Marchal, Gestalen, Francis Bayer du Kern, Goulven Mazéas and Rafig Tullou. Members also founded the neo-Pagan Druidic group Kredenn Geltiek Hollvedel.

In 1938 the Breton federalists signed a manifesto which affirmed:

...the pressing duty to gather those of our compatriots who do not want to confuse Brittany with the Church; Brittany with reaction; Brittany with puerile anti-French bias; Brittany with capitalism; and even less, Brittany with racism.

== New league ==
When the Parti pour l'Organisation d'une Bretagne Libre split in 2000, two new parties were created on the model of the PNB and the LFB. The former was named Adsav, and the latter reused the name of the old Breton Federalist League.

== Publications ==
La Bretagne Fédérale, revue de la Ligue Fédéraliste de Bretagne.

== Bibliography ==
La Ligue Fédéraliste de Bretagne - Breiz Kevredel (1931–1935) : aux origines du bretonnisme de gauche, maîtrise d'histoire, Christian Guyonvarc'h.
