= Maurice Duhamel =

Maurice Duhamel (23 February 1884 – 5 February 1940) was the pen-name of Maurice Bourgeaux, a Breton musician, writer and activist who was a leading figure in Breton nationalism and federalist politics in the years before World War II.

== Early life ==
The son of a coal merchant, Duhamel was born in Rennes. From his youth, he displayed great musical talent, composing his own original works and collecting and arranging traditional Breton songs. He also worked as a journalist for music magazines. Meanwhile, he learned the Breton language and studied Breton literature.

At the age of 19, he reported for a local newspaper on the trial of Alfred Dreyfus, which took place in the premises of his high school in Rennes. Like his father he was a Dreyfusard and a Freemason. However, he left Freemasonry because he was shocked by the Affaire Des Fiches in 1905.

== Political activity ==
He joined the Breton Regionalist Union (Union Régionaliste Bretonne) and composed the piano score for Bro Gozh ma Zadoù, the song chosen by the Union to be the Breton national anthem. In 1912, he resigned from the Union, along with Emile Masson, Camille Le Mercier d'Erm, François Vallée and Loeiz Herrieu, to found the more leftist Breton Regionalist Federation, which, contrary to other Bretonist organisations, survived the First World War, and started a political magazine, Le Réveil breton, in 1920.

In 1926, he met Olier Mordrel and Morvan Marchal. The three men rapidly formed themselves into a steering committee to create the Breton Autonomist Party, which was founded in 1927. He was responsible for establishing links to national French political movements, particularly the French left. He became editor in chief of the party journal Breiz Atao and he gave the party a federalist and leftist orientation. However, his views clashed with the right wing of the party, led by Mordrel, which was drawn to outright separatism and was in sympathy with Nazi ideology.

The disputes eventually led both Duhamel and Marchal to resign in early 1931. Duhamel explained his own federalist vision:

The current status of Europe is outdated, and the internationalization of economic life requires a political federation where existing states allow room for genuine national communities. But here, the autonomy of federal components is no longer required because of history, race or old treaties, but because it is the natural outcome of a new organization which is essential for Europe if it is to escape the wars that its economic borders attract - as iron attracts lightning.

Faced with the creation of Mordrel's pro-Nazi Breton National Party, Duhamel, Marchal and others set up the short-lived Breton Federalist League, which was replaced after 1933 by other groups.

In the late 1930s, Duhamel worked on his History of the Breton People: from their origins to 1532, which was published in 1939. However, copies were seized by the French government on its publication because its perceived anti-French viewpoint was seen as seditious on the outbreak of World War II. Duhamel died of cancer in 1940 without having completed the second volume of his History of the Breton People, which was to have covered the period after the union of Brittany with France in 1532.

== Musical works ==
Duhamel's compositions were primarily for voice and piano. His orchestral works are few. Brittany was central to Duhamel's inspiration as the names of his works such as Impressions de Bretagne and Esquisses bretonnes emphasise. In 1912, he was also a co-founder of the Association des Compositeurs Bretons and, together with Paul Ladmirault, one of its driving forces. Like Louis-Albert Bourgault-Ducoudray and François-Marie Luzel before him, he collected folk ballads. His publications on the subject are important, and he was highly regarded by the most influential writers on the subject of the era, such as Anatole Le Braz and Joseph Loth.

Orchestral

- Trois Petites pièces orientales (1924)
- Harald. Ouverture (1926)
- Quatre Incidentaux. Contains: 1. La Trahison, 2. Galopade, 3. Bataille, 4. Epilogue (1927)
- Quatre Incidentaux. Contains: 1. Grazioso, 2. Amoroso, 3. Doloroso, 4. Agitato (1927)
- En terre celtique. Contains: 1. Chanson galloise, 2. Cortège de noce en Trégor, 3. Dans les brumes de la mer des Hébrides, 4. Cornemuse des Highlands, 5. Soir de mai dans l'Argoad, 6. Danse des Epées (1928)
- Sous un balcon de Murcie (1929)
- Habanera (1929)
- Deux Marches celtiques (1930)

Chamber music

- Soniou an Dous, Canevon y briodferch for cello or viola and piano (1911)

Piano

- Le Chevalier du guet (1905)
- Valse (1906)
- Impressions de Bretagne (1907)
- Esquisses bretonnes (1915)
- En terre celtique. Contains: 1. Chanson galloise, 2. Cortège de noce en Trégor, 3. Dans les brumes de la mer des Hébrides, 4. Cornemuse des Highlands, 5. Soir de mai dans l'Argoad, 6. Danse des Epées (1925)

Vocal and sacred

- Viviane. Drame lyrique
- Le Cœur peut changer. Comic opera (1908)
- Gwerziou ha Soniou Breiz Izel (1913)
- Chansons populaires du Pays de Vannes (1930)
- arrangements of works by romantic composers
- arrangements of folk songs

== Publications ==
- Musiques bretonnes, "Gwerziou ha soniou Breiz-Izel", preface by Anatole Le Braz (Paris: Rouart, Lerolle et Cie., Éditeurs, 1913; reprint: Paris: Dastum, 1997)
- La Question bretonne dans son cadre Européen (Paris: Delpeuch, 1929)
- Chansons populaires du pays de Vannes, by Loeiz Herrieu, tunes transcribed by Maurice Duhamel, 1930, republished by EROMI, Lorient (1997)
- Histoire du peuple breton. Original edition seized in 1939; reprinted 2000.
