= Party for the Organization of a Free Brittany =

French political party

The Party for the Organization of a Free Brittany (Breton: Strollad Evit Breizh Dizalc'h; French: Parti pour l'organisation d'une Bretagne libre) was a Breton political party that advocated political sovereignty for Brittany. Its initials "POBL" form a backronym, as the word pobl in Breton means "people" or "community".

At its foundation the party claimed to be "Na ruz na gwenn" ("neither red nor white"), and was firmly right-wing. Through its history it progressively drifted toward the far-right and two of its members were involved in an altercation with leftist militants of the Union Démocratique Bretonne at the Festival Interceltique de Lorient in 1999.

Never very influential, the party was crippled by the departure of most of its cadres for Adsav in 2000 and ceased its activities. What remained of it merged with other minor organisations to form the Ligue fédéraliste de Bretagne.
