= Charles-Auguste Lebourg =

French sculptor

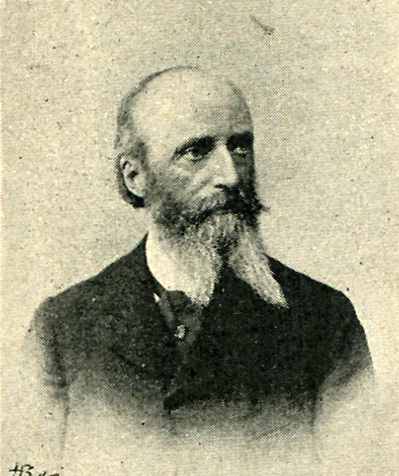
- Born: 20 February 1829; Nantes, France
- Died: February 1906 (age 77); Paris, France
- Known for: Sculpture
- Notable work: Wallace fountains
- Patrons: Richard Wallace

Charles-Auguste Lebourg (20 February 1829 – February 1906) was a French sculptor, best known for the sculptural design of the Wallace fountains, which are found in virtually every quarter of Paris and in various cities throughout the world. He also created numerous statues and busts in bronze and marble, winning recognition at various Salons and World's Fairs throughout the latter half of the nineteenth century. His work is on display at the Musée d'Orsay in Paris and the Fine Arts Museum in Nantes, as well as various parks and cemeteries in France.

== Life ==
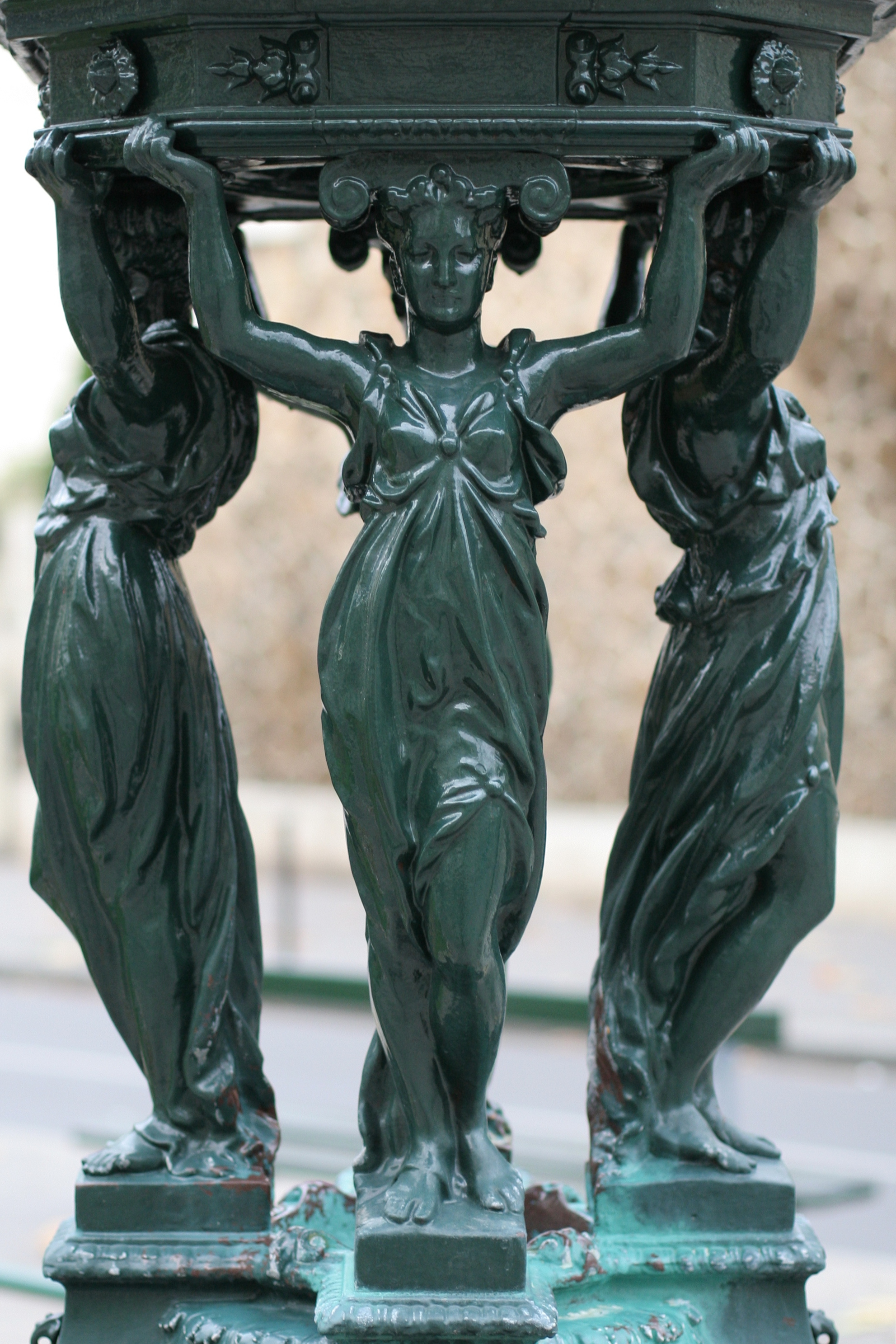
Wallace fountain caryatids

Lebourg was born in Nantes, the son of Auguste François Lebourg and Hyacinthe Virginie Langlair. He studied drawing and sculpture under Nantes sculptor Amédée Ménard (ca. 1805–1873). In 1851, he moved to Paris, where he continued studying sculpture under François Rude. Lebourg first exhibited at the Paris Salon of 1852, displaying a marble bust of a doctor.

Lebourg's bronze work, Enfant nègre jouant avec un lézard ("Negro child playing with a lizard"), debuted at the Paris Salon of 1853, and won honorable mention at the city's Exposition Universelle two years later. He exhibited a bronze statue of a bagpipe player at the Salon of 1857, and his marble work, Gallic Victim, won a medal at the Salon of 1859. For the Salon of 1867, Lebourg exhibited a terra cotta work, Games of Love. He won a medal the following year with a marble statue, L'enfant à la sauterelle. Lebourg's 1883 Salon entry, Le Travail, was originally a plaster statue that was later cast in bronze. During this same period, Lebourg provided decorative work for additions to the Louvre, the Church of the Holy Trinity, and the Hôtel de Ville (Paris's city hall).

Following the Franco-Prussian War, Paris's aqueduct system was in ruins, making clean drinking water scarce. To remedy this, Sir Richard Wallace, a wealthy English art collector living in Paris, decided to build a series of drinking fountains throughout the city. To hurry the project along, he hired Lebourg, with whom he was already familiar. The first "Wallace fountains" were installed in Paris in 1872.

Lebourg entered his work at salons in Nantes in 1872 and 1886, and in Rennes in 1887. His final entry at the Paris Salon was in 1904. He died in poverty in Paris in February 1906.

== Works ==
Lebourg is best known for the Wallace fountains, which can be found throughout the world. More than 100 of the fountains are scattered throughout France, mostly in Paris, but also in Nantes, Bordeaux, and several other French cities. At least six fountains are found in Uruguayan capital of Montevideo. Five Wallace fountains were erected in Lisburn, in Northern Ireland, though three of these were destroyed for scrap metal during World War II.

Wallace stipulated that the designs of the fountains follow several guidelines. First, the fountains should be tall enough to be visible from afar, but not so tall as to affect the harmony of the immediate landscape. The fountains had to be both easy to use and pleasing to the eye, and affordable enough to allow the maximum number to be installed. The materials used to build the fountains needed to be weather resistant and easy to maintain.

The larger fountains stand 2.71 metres (8.9 ft), and consist of an octagonal pedestal topped with four unique caryatids– representing kindness, simplicity, charity and sobriety– supporting a dome decorated with dolphins. The design of this larger model was inspired by the Fontaine des Innocents in Paris, while the caryatid figures may have been inspired by Renaissance sculptor Germain Pilon's Les trois grâces. Some smaller models feature the head of a nymph to distribute water, and later models utilize columns rather than caryatids.

Lebourg's other work can be found in buildings, parks and cemeteries in Paris and Nantes. His bronze equestrian statue of Joan of Arc stands in front of the Church of Saint Donatien and Saint Rogatien in Nantes. Caryatids carved by Lebourg in 1865 still adorn the building at 17, rue de Chateaudun, in Paris. Lebourg's statue of the Priestess of Eleusis is on display at the Fine Arts Museum in Nantes. He provided one step in the monument to the 1870 defenders of Paris. Lebourg created busts of numerous individuals, among them Lady Wallace (wife of Richard Wallace), Émile de Girardin, Auguste Comte, and Eugène Livet.

== Gallery ==
=== Wallace fountains ===
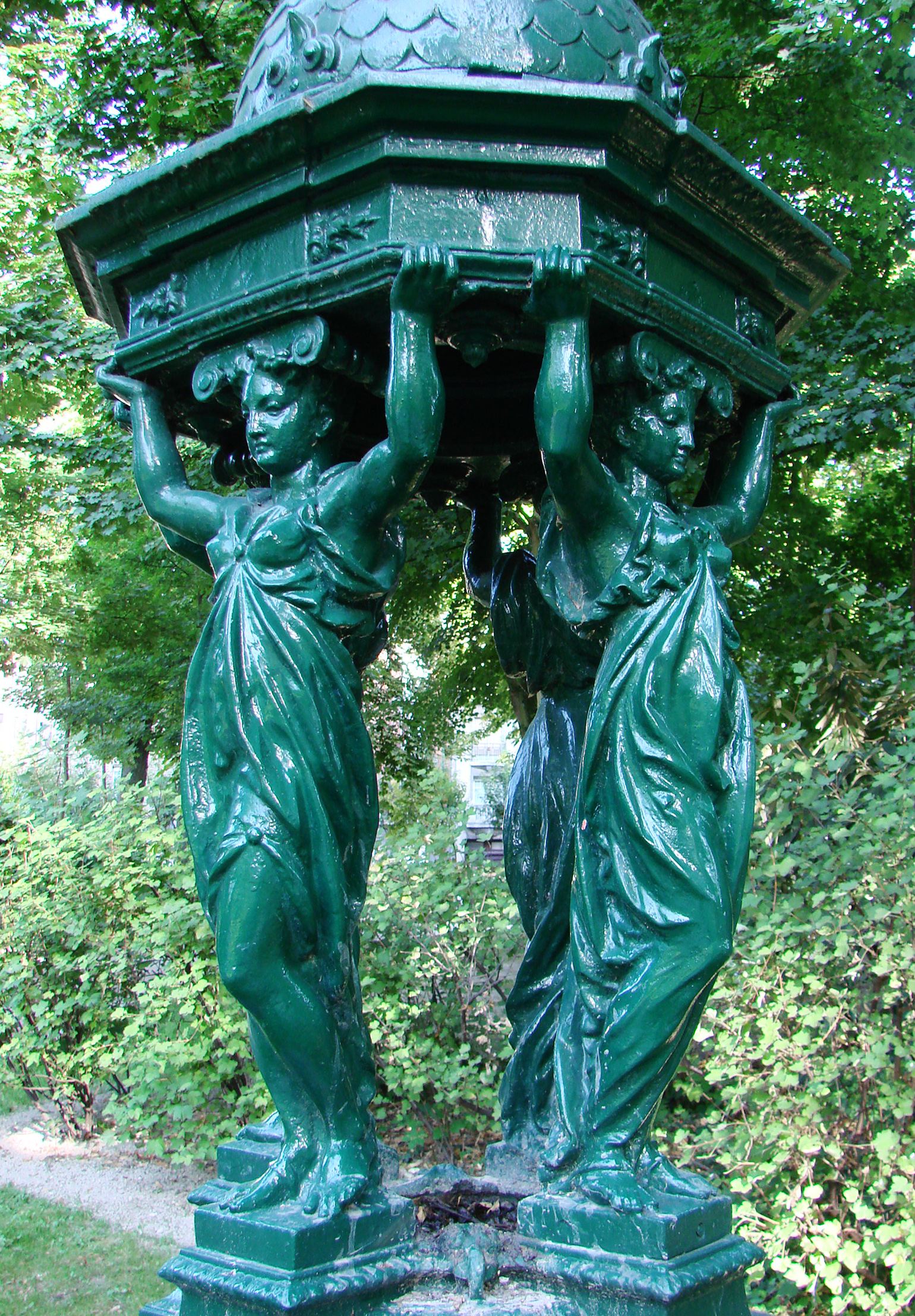

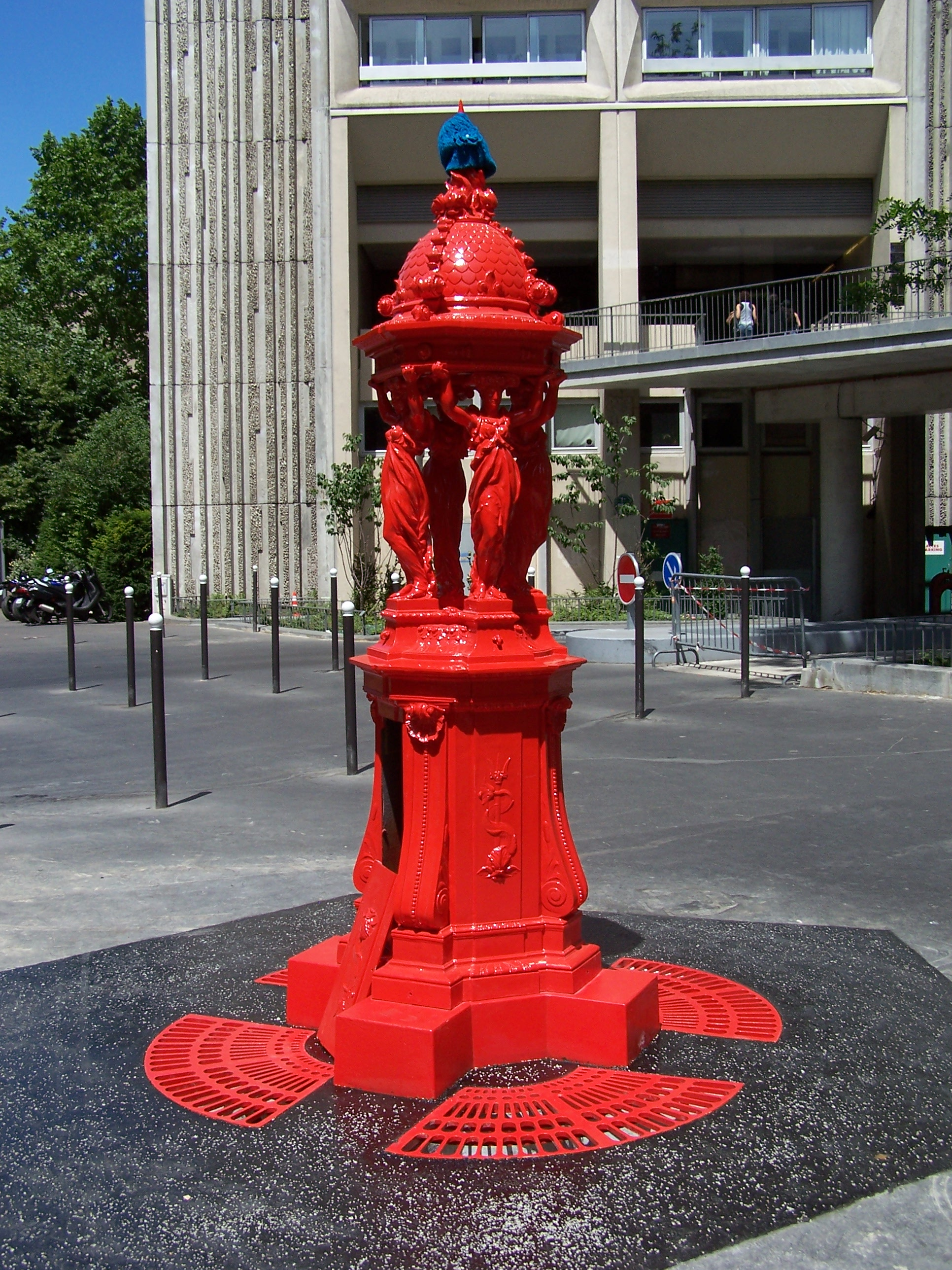

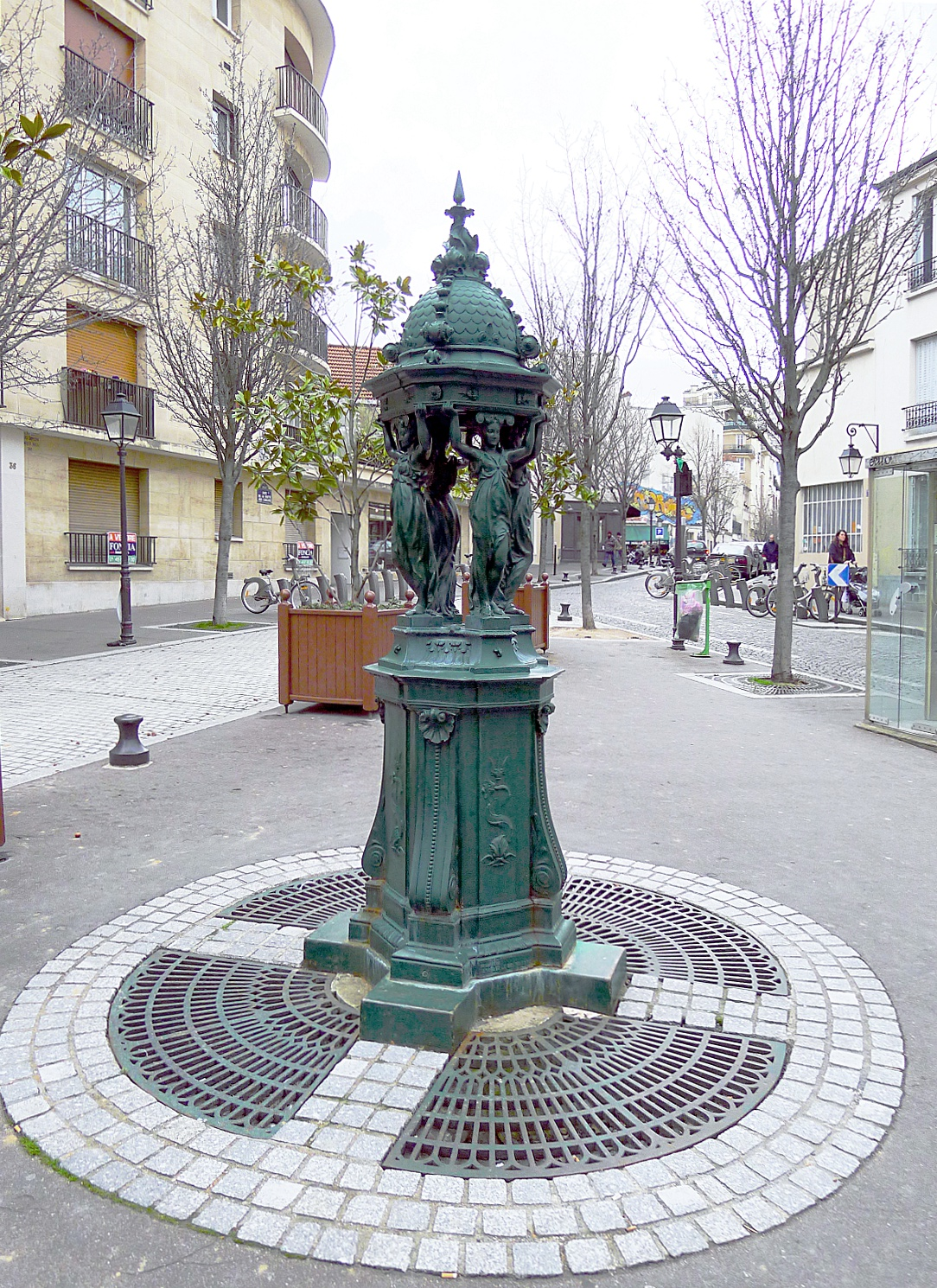

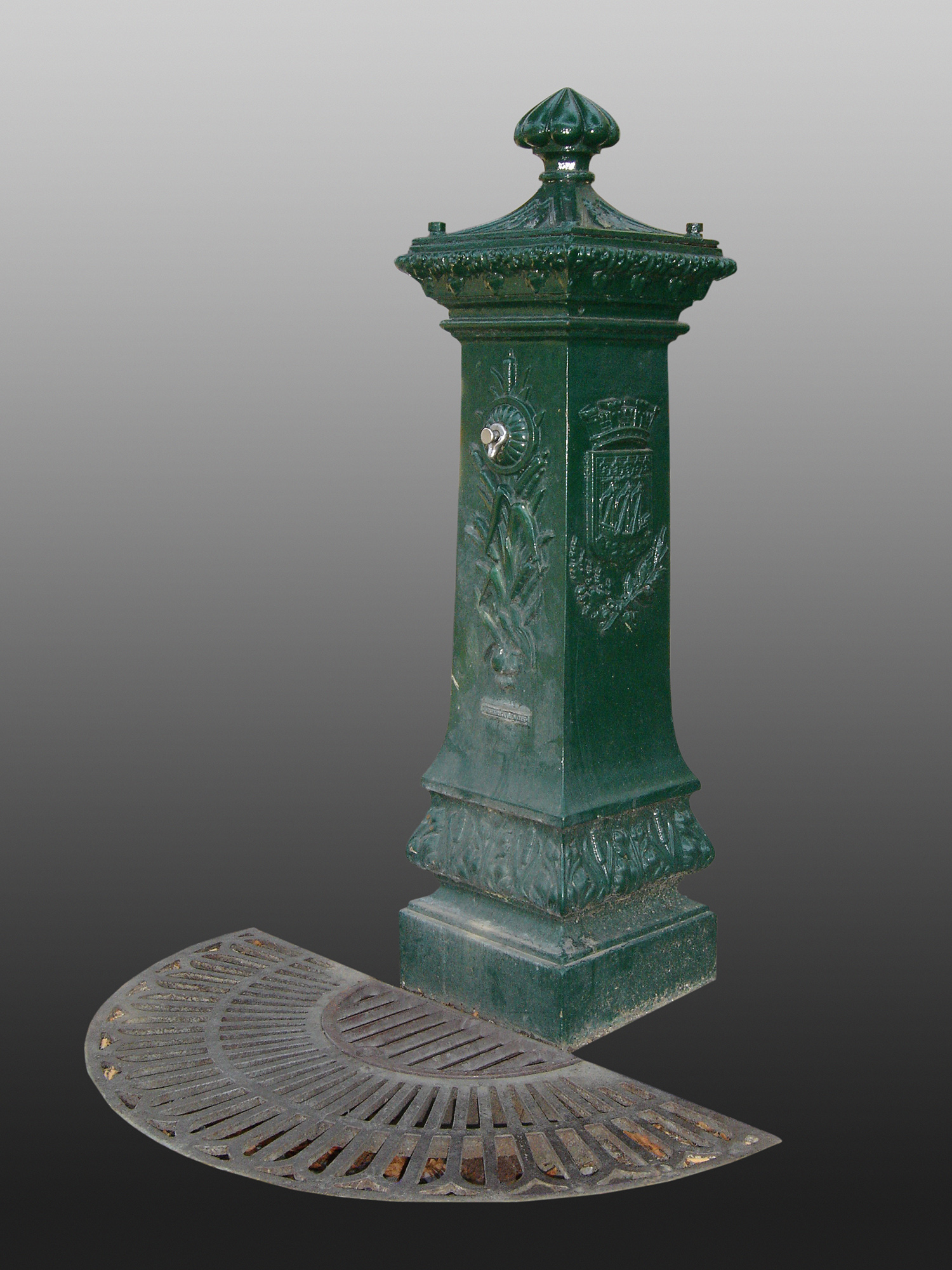

=== Other works ===
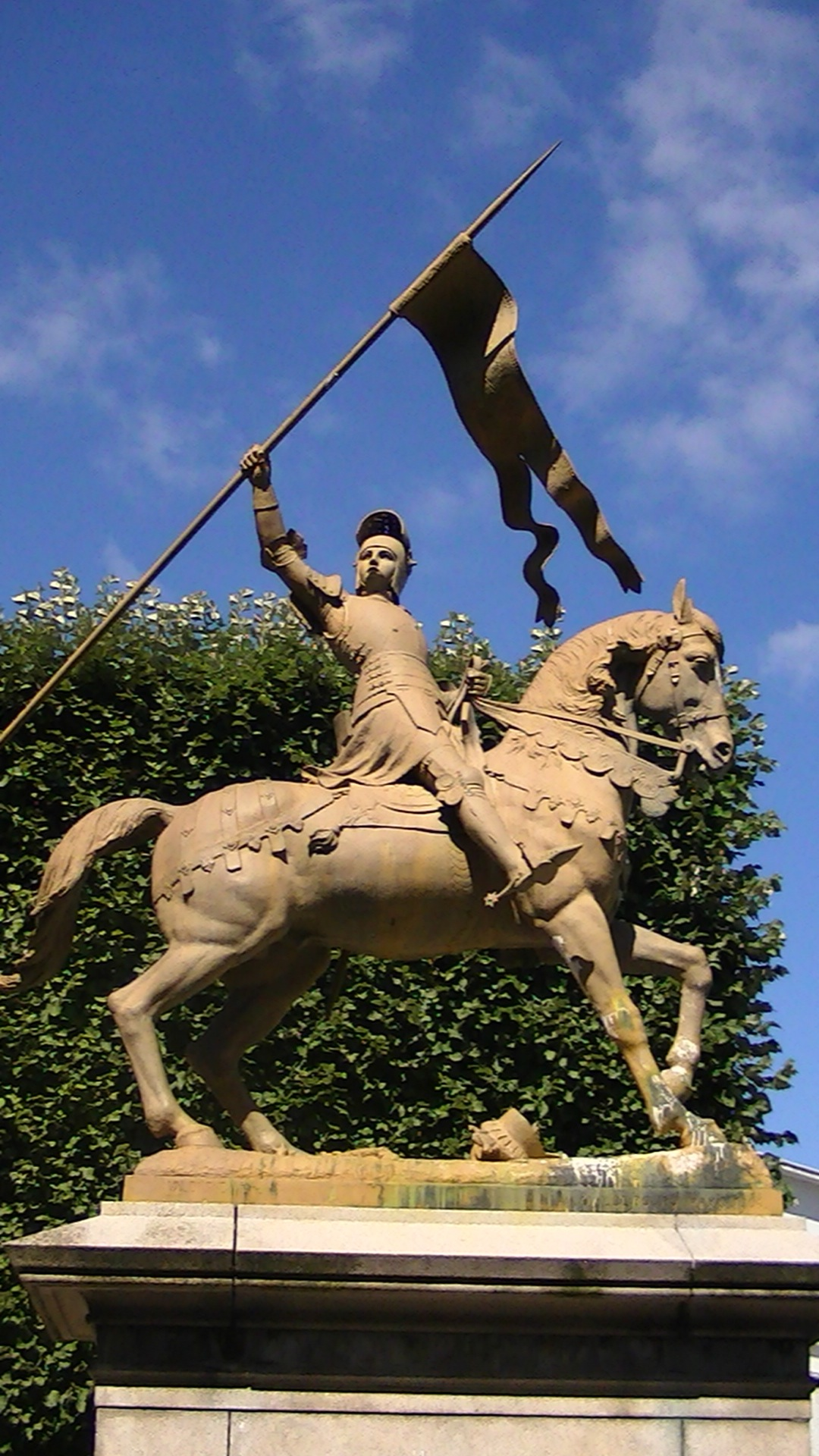
Statue of Joan of Arc in Nantes

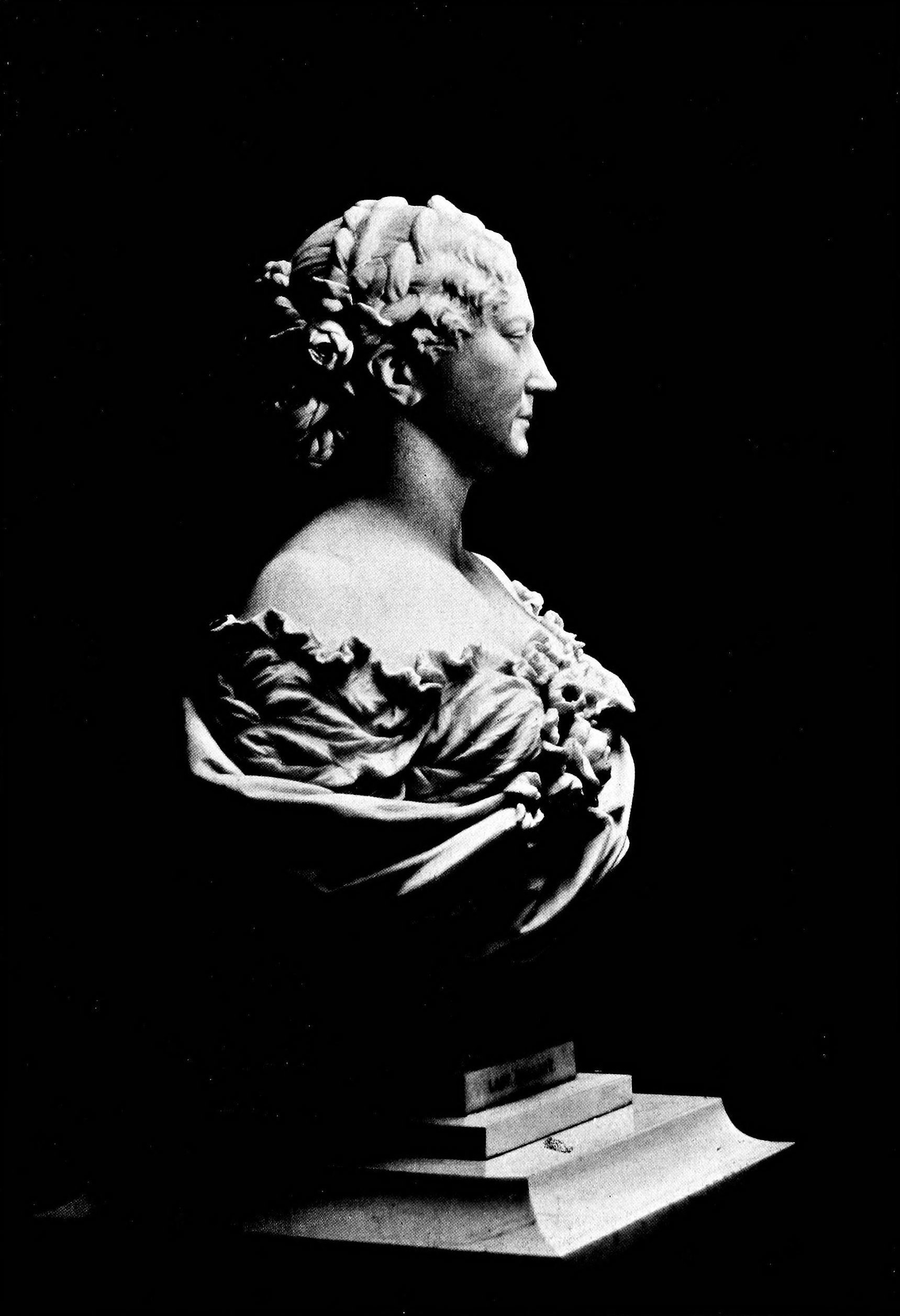
Bust of Lady Wallace

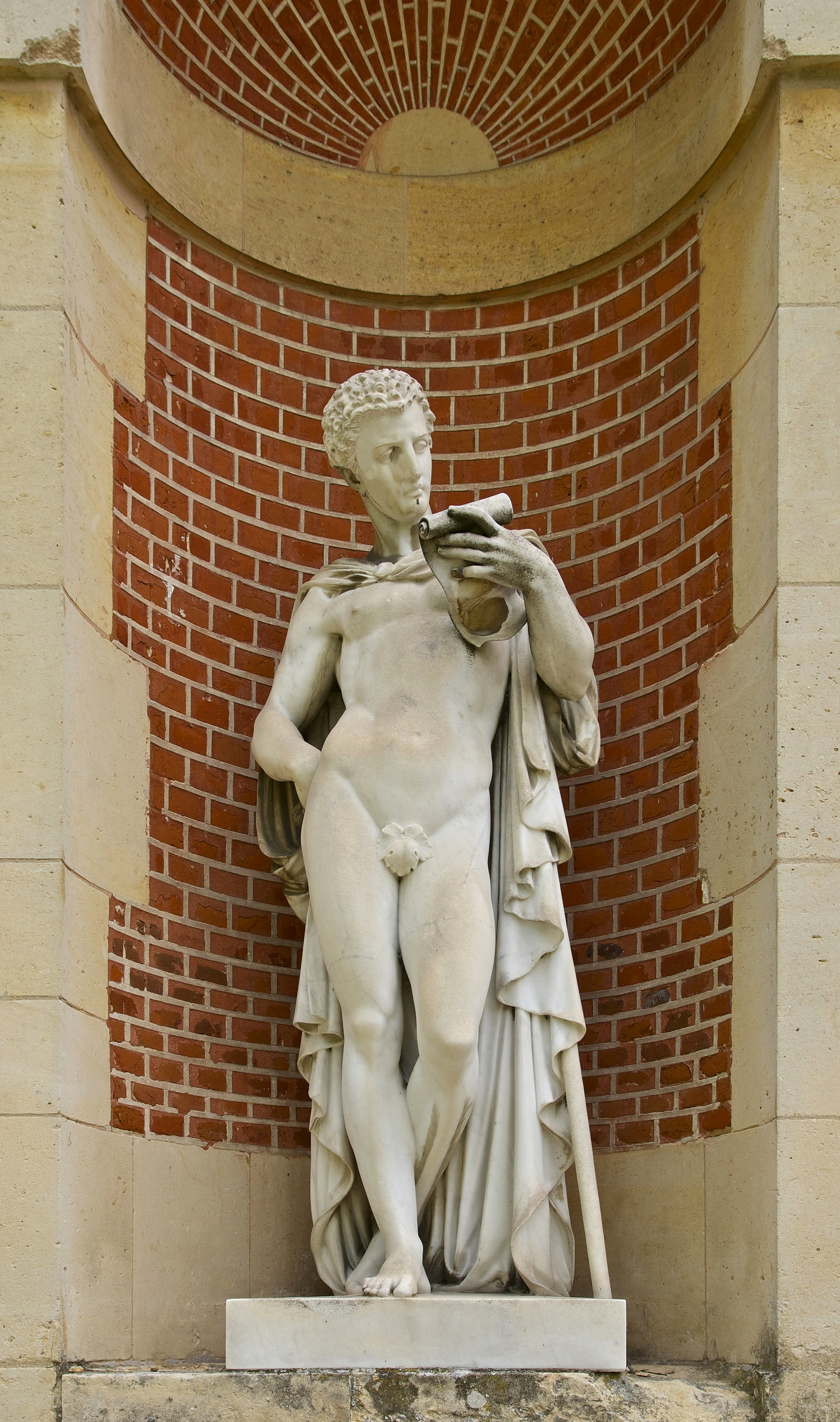
Statue at the Palace of Fontainebleau

== See also ==
- Fountains in Paris
- List of works by Charles-Auguste Lebourg
