= Breton Autonomist Party =

The Breton Autonomist Party (French: Parti Autonomiste Breton or PAB, Breton: Strollad Emrenerien Vreiz) was a political party which existed in Brittany from 1927 to 1931.

== Origin ==
The party was created at the first congress of the nationalist journal Breiz Atao in Rosporden in September 1927. It followed from establishment of the Unvaniez Yaouankiz Vreiz (UYV: Union of Breton Youth). The steering committee comprised Olier Mordrel, Morvan Marchal and Maurice Duhamel. At Quimper, following the congress, representatives of Brittany, Alsace-Lorraine and Corsica signed the founding charter of Central Committee of the National Minorities of France. The guests were the Alsatian separatists, Paul Schall and Hermann Bickler, the Corsican separatist Petru Rocca, the Flemish Franz Wielders, and, more discreetly, Hans-Otto Wagner, the German representative who established links between the Breton movement and the Abwehr.

== Federalism ==
Maurice Duhamel became editor of Breiz Atao and attempted to steer the party to establish links to wider French politics, particularly with the French left. Having more political experience than the other leaders, he guided the PAB to a broadly leftist and federalist position with the intention to forge an alliance with the French Communist Party, which, under the leadership of Marcel Cachin, supported the struggles of national minorities in France up until 1932.

In August 1928, at the second party congress, in Châteaulin, a statement was drafted which proclaimed that Brittany has all "the characteristics of a nationality to meet the modern definitions", and that the Breton people should have "the right to self-determination".

In 1929 Duhamel wrote the PAB's manifesto, The Question of Brittany in its European Framework.

== Electoral failures ==
At elections in 1930, Goulven Mazéas was put forward by the PAB as a candidate in the Guingamp constituency, but he only secured 376 votes. Their candidate in Rennes received 81 votes out of 16084. The PAB's complete failure to gain electoral success in addition the cost of the campaigns had ruined its finances. Moreover, it was unable to compete with the Catholic regionalist party Adsao. François Debeauvais proposed the creation of a weekly newspaper entitled Le Peuple Breton to improve the party's public profile, but it could not be published for lack of funding.

== Dissolution of the party ==
The two election failures, and the financial crisis crystallized the party's internal quarrels. A final attempt at conciliation took place at the annual party Congress April 11, 1931. It was a failure, and the party broke up under the differences. It split between the federalists on the one hand and nationalists on the other. At the same congress, it was decided to relinquish the newspaper Breiz Atao. The federalists (Morvan Marchal, Yann-Morvan Gefflot, Goulven Mazéas, René-Yves Creston, Le Men, Abeozen) went on to create the Breton Federalist League whose new journal was Federal Brittany.

Breiz Atao was briefly replaced by the journal War Zao, run by the nationalist faction in Trégor, Goëlo and Haute-Cornouaille, which called for a return to nationalism without excluding separatism. The nationalists went on to create the Breton National Party at the Congress of Guingamp in August 1931, reviving Breiz Atao as their party's paper.
