= Jean-Joseph Perraud =

French sculptor

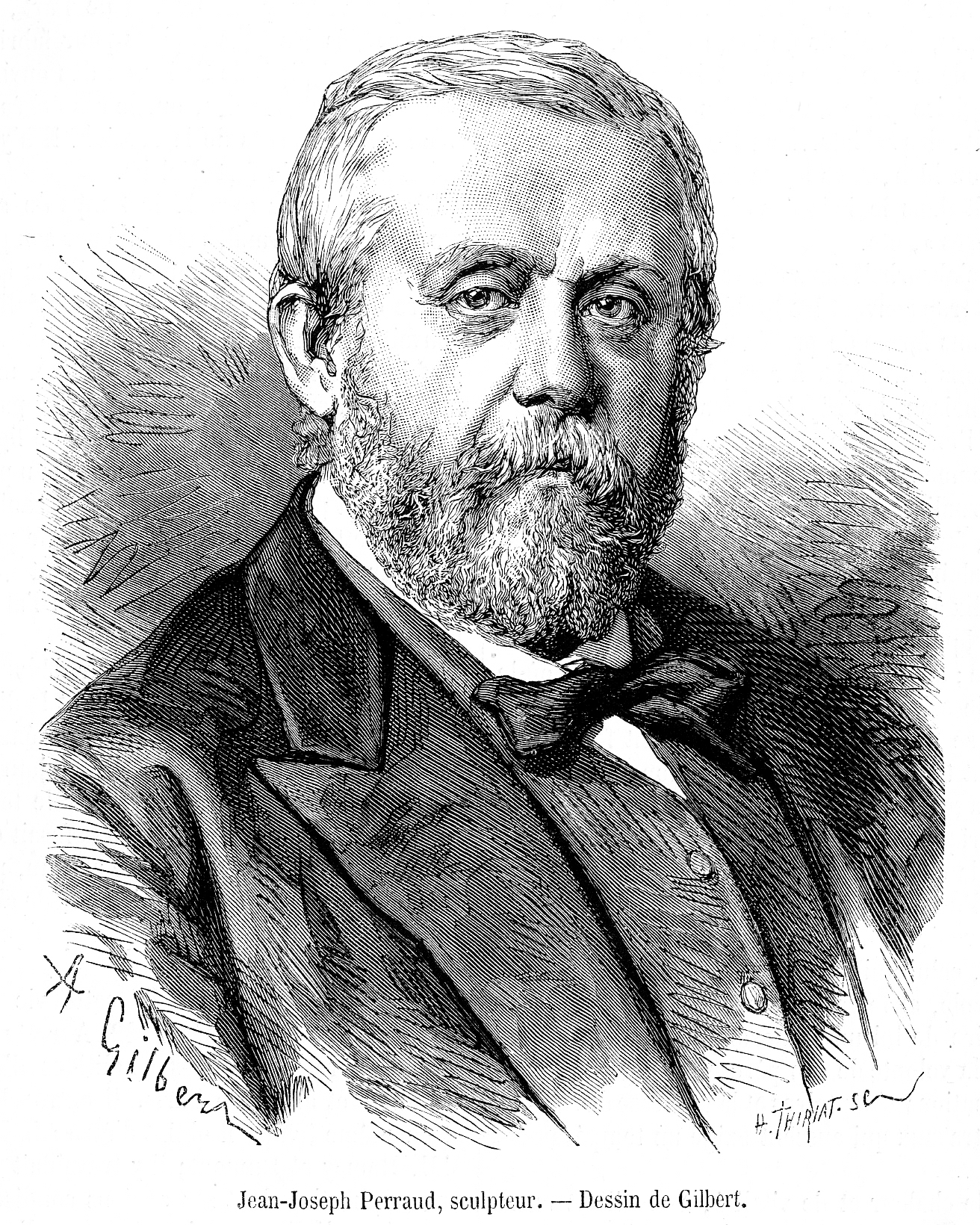
Jean-Joseph Perraud

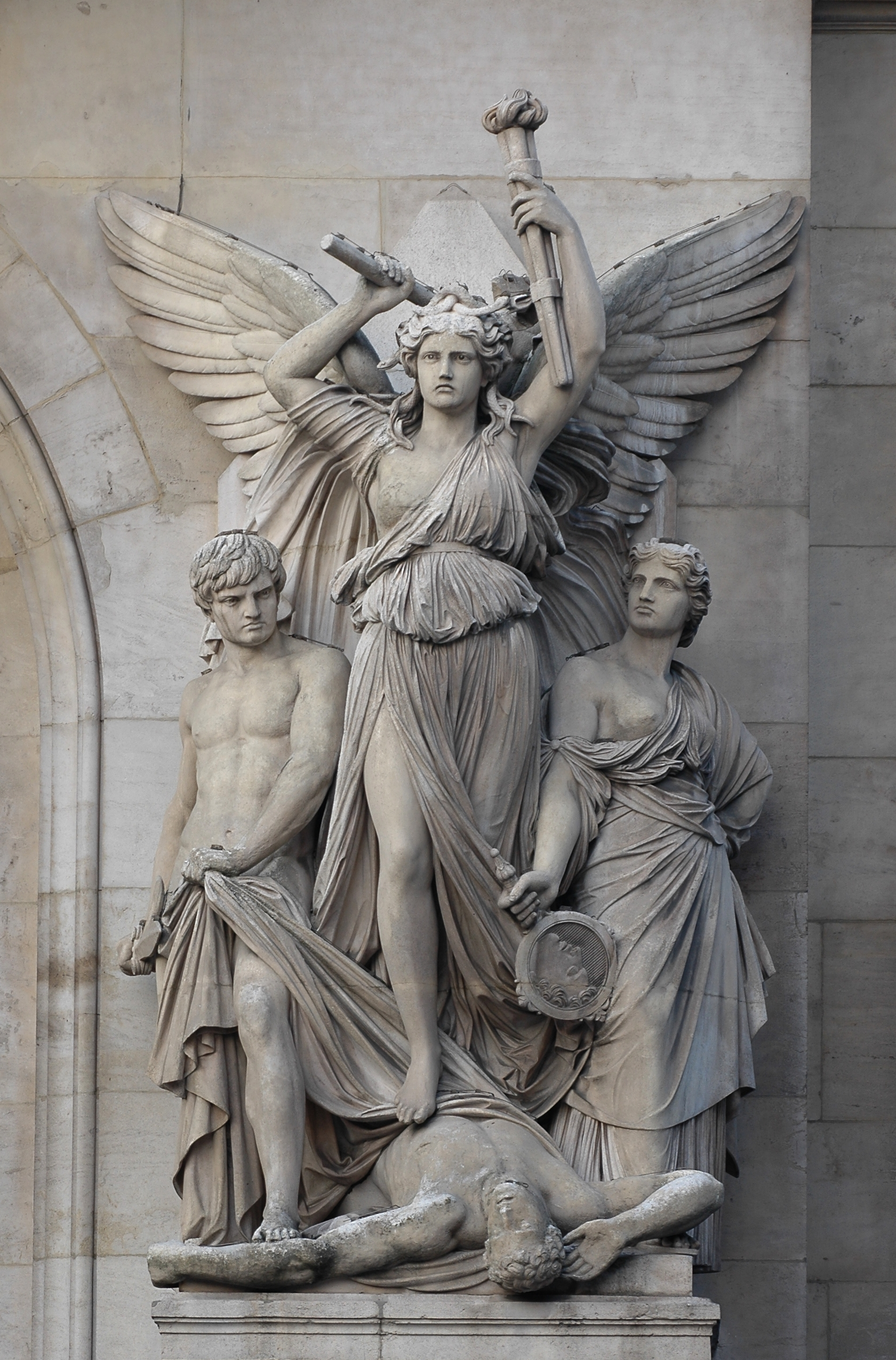
Lyrical Drama, Palais Garnier, Paris

Jean-Joseph Perraud (26 April 1819, Jura - 2 November 1876) was a French academic sculptor. According to Eaton, "During the Second Empire no sculptor enjoyed a greater reputation", although his style fell out of fashion soon after his death.

== Biography ==
Perraud was a student at the École des Beaux-Arts from 1843 under Etienne-Jules Ramey and Augustin-Alexandre Dumont, co-winner of the Prix de Rome in 1847, officer in the Legion of Honor in 1867, and member of the Académie des Beaux-Arts.

Perraud died in Paris. He is buried in Montparnasse Cemetery.

== Major works ==
- Télémaque apportant à Phalante l'urne renfermant les cendres d'Hippias (based on Fénelon's The Adventures of Telemachus)
- Childhood of Bacchus from 1863 and now at the Louvre
- figure of Jérôme Lalande, facade of the Louvre
- Lyrical Drama figural group on the facade of the Palais Garnier, 1865–69
- figure of Berlin on the facade of the Gare du Nord
- Despair, at the Musée d'Orsay, 1869
- statue of Saint Denis, at the Church of St Vaast, Arras, Pas-de-Calais

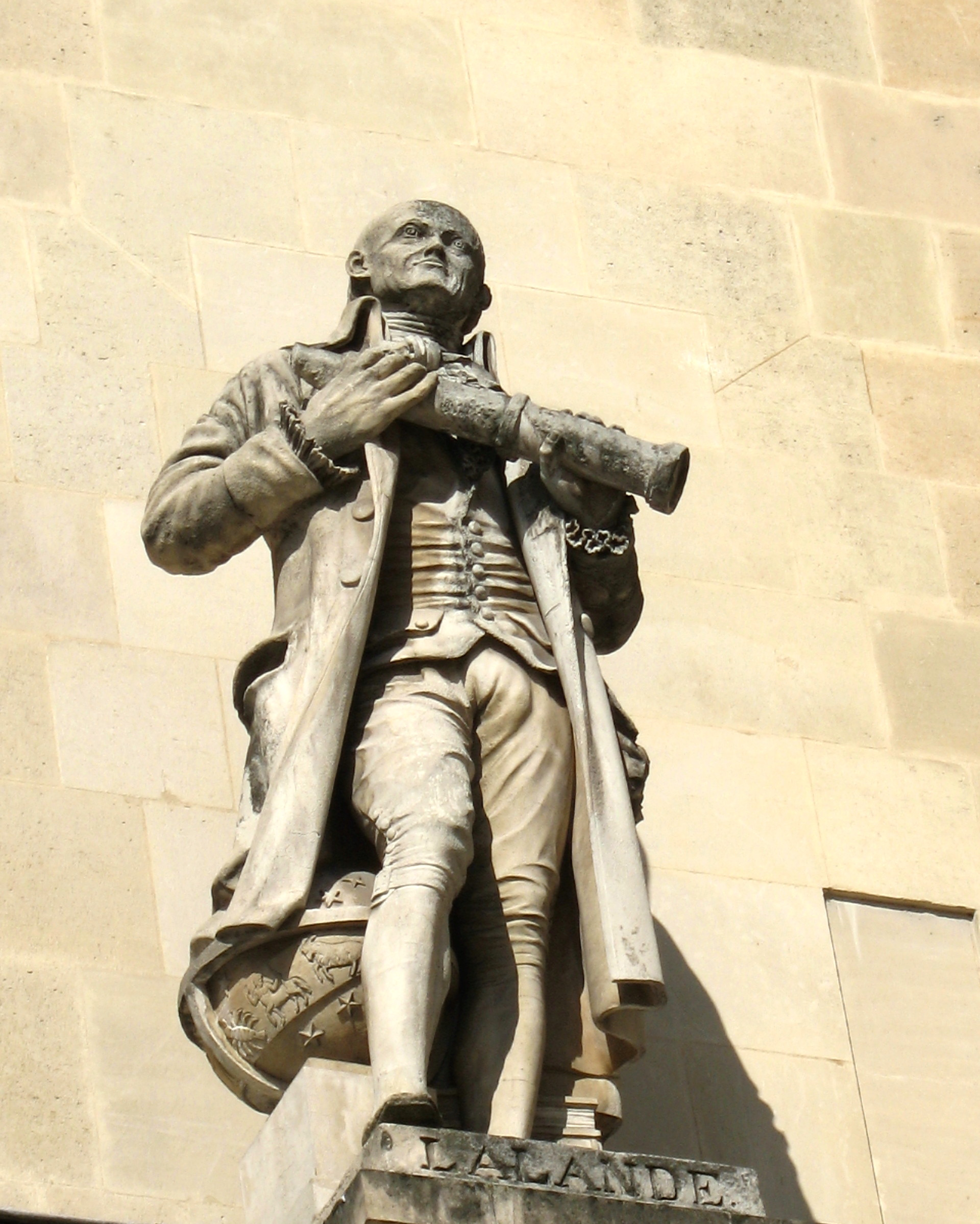
Lalan's statue on Louvre facade

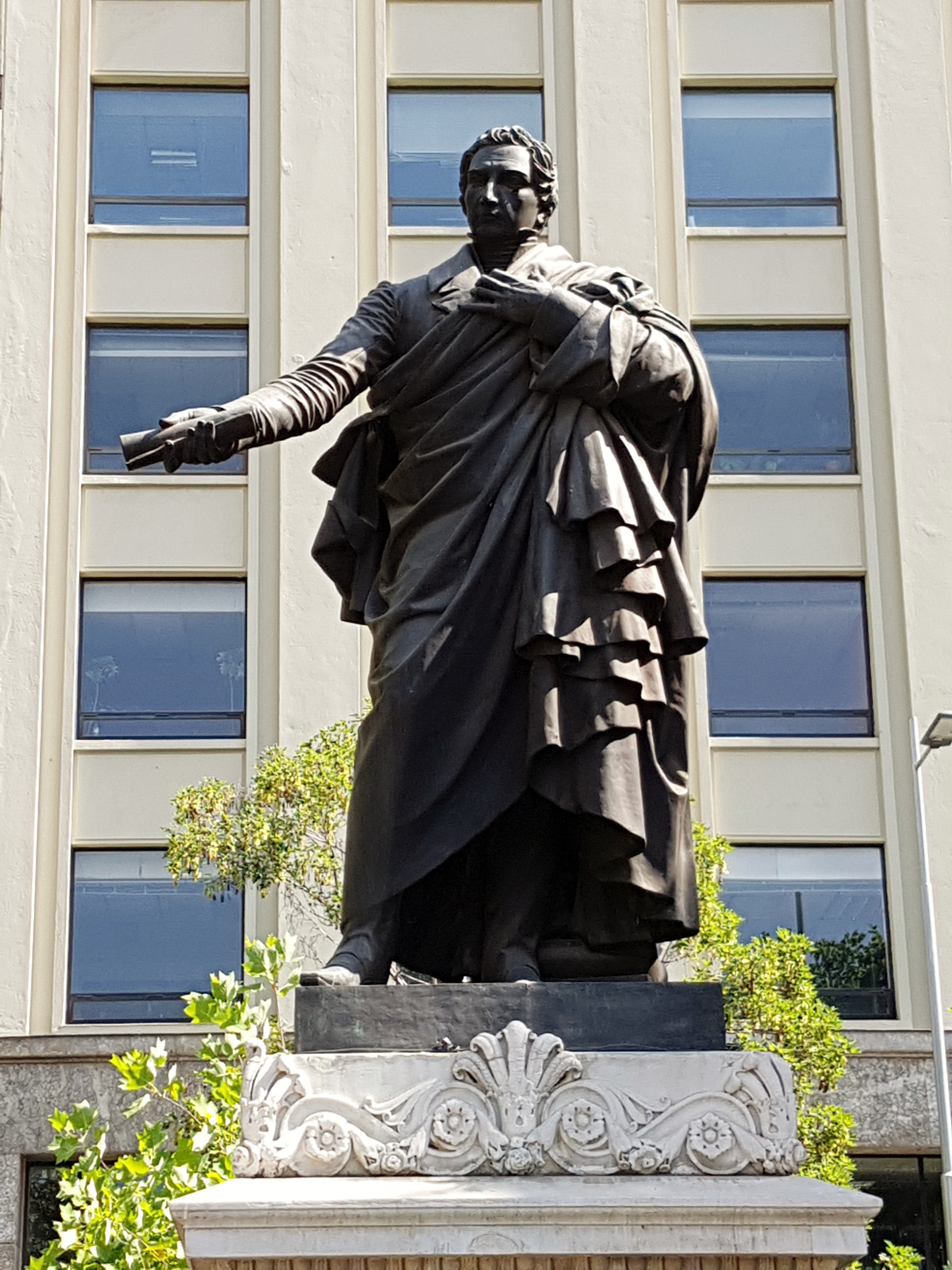
Statue of Diego Portales

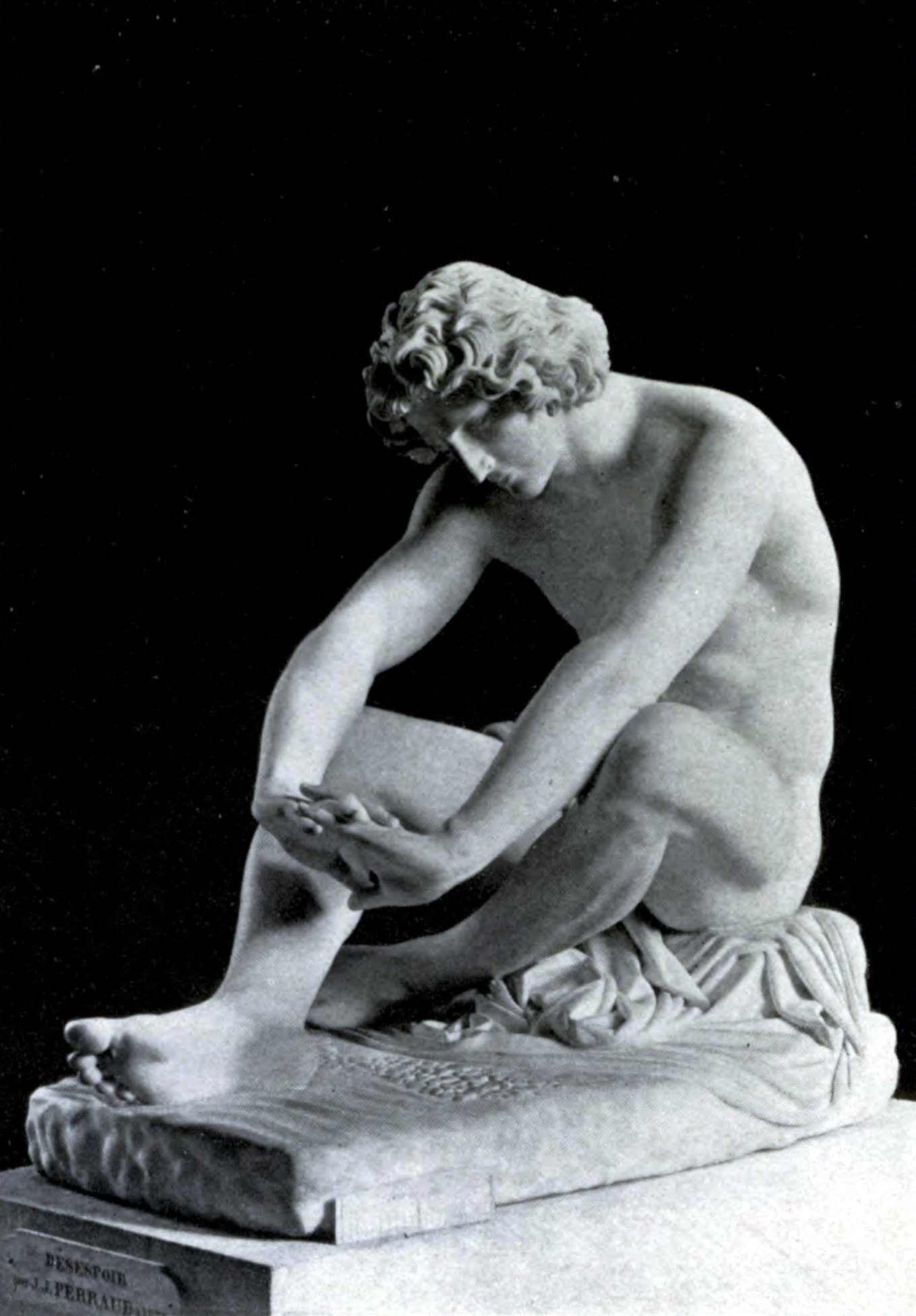
Statue named "Desperation"
