= Adsav =

Political party in Brittany, France

- President: Ronan Le Gall
- Founded: 2000
- Split from: POBL
- Ideology: Breton nationalism Identitarianism; Third Position
- Political position: Far-right
- Colors: Orange, yellow, black, white

Party flag

Adsav (lit. 'Revival' or 'Rebirth') is a Breton nationalist secessionist political party in Brittany that claims to be neither right-wing or left-wing although its roots are on the right, and it is widely considered to be a far-right party.

Adsav was created after a split inside the Parti pour l'Organisation d'une Bretagne Libre. The other faction created the Breton Federalist League. Adsav claims 700 members, but that figure is considered a gross overestimation by other political forces. It organises an annual commemoration at the site of the 1488 Battle of Saint-Aubin-du-Cormier.

In 2002, Adsav was expelled from a rally promoting the reintegration of Nantes into Brittany when its members spray-painted "Bretagne pour les Bretons" (English: Brittany for the Bretons) on billboards and heckled a group of Berber singers.

Adsav dropped below 50 declared members in 2016, and has since been considered inactive.
