= Étienne-Jules Ramey =

French sculptor

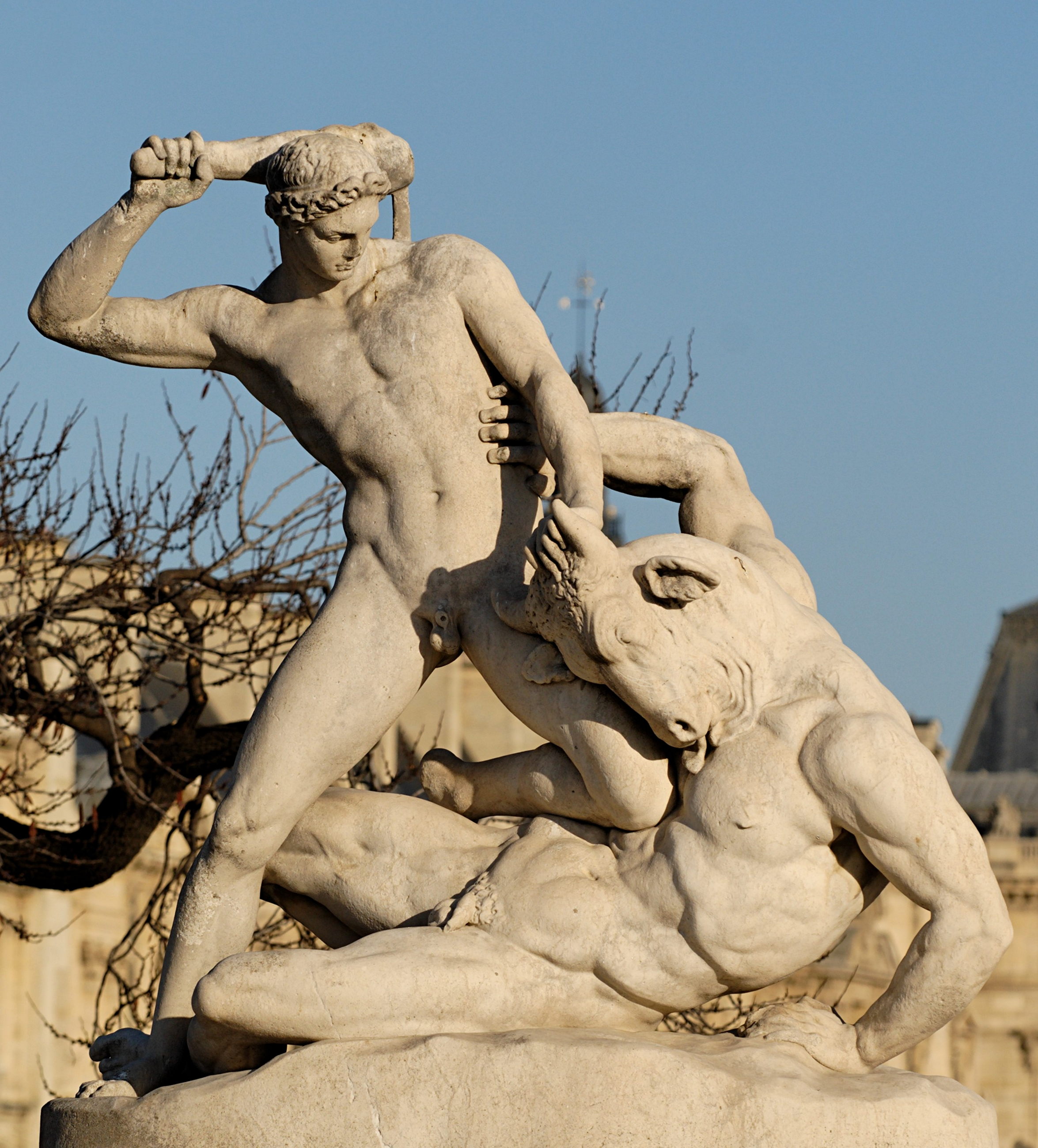
Ramey's Theseus and the Minotaur, 1826 Jardin des Tuileries, Paris

Étienne-Jules Ramey (24 May 1796 – 29 October 1852), called Ramey fils, was a French sculptor, and artist.

== Biography ==
Ramey was born in Paris. The pupil of his father, Claude Ramey (1754–1838), he also trained in the studio of Pierre Cartellier. He won the Prix de Rome in sculpture in 1815 with the subject, equally classicizing and sentimental, Ulysses recognized by his dog. He collaborated with David d'Angers on the sculptures for the triumphal arch at Marseille, the Porte d'Aix, 1828 to 1839.

He worked in partnership with Augustin-Alexandre Dumont and taught at the École nationale supérieure des Beaux-Arts in Paris. His pupils included the sculptors Guillaume Geefs, Jean-Joseph Perraud, and Amédée Ménard. He died in Paris.

His careful, mannered drawings appear on the market from time to time.

== Selected works ==
- Thésée combattant le Minotaure (1826), limestone group, Jardin des Tuileries, Paris
- Saint Luc, limestone Paris, peristyle of the rear façade of the Église de la Madeleine
- Saint Pierre and Saint Paul, limestone, Paris, Église Saint-Vincent-de-Paul, place Franz-Liszt
