= Amédée Ménard =

French academic sculptor and art teacher

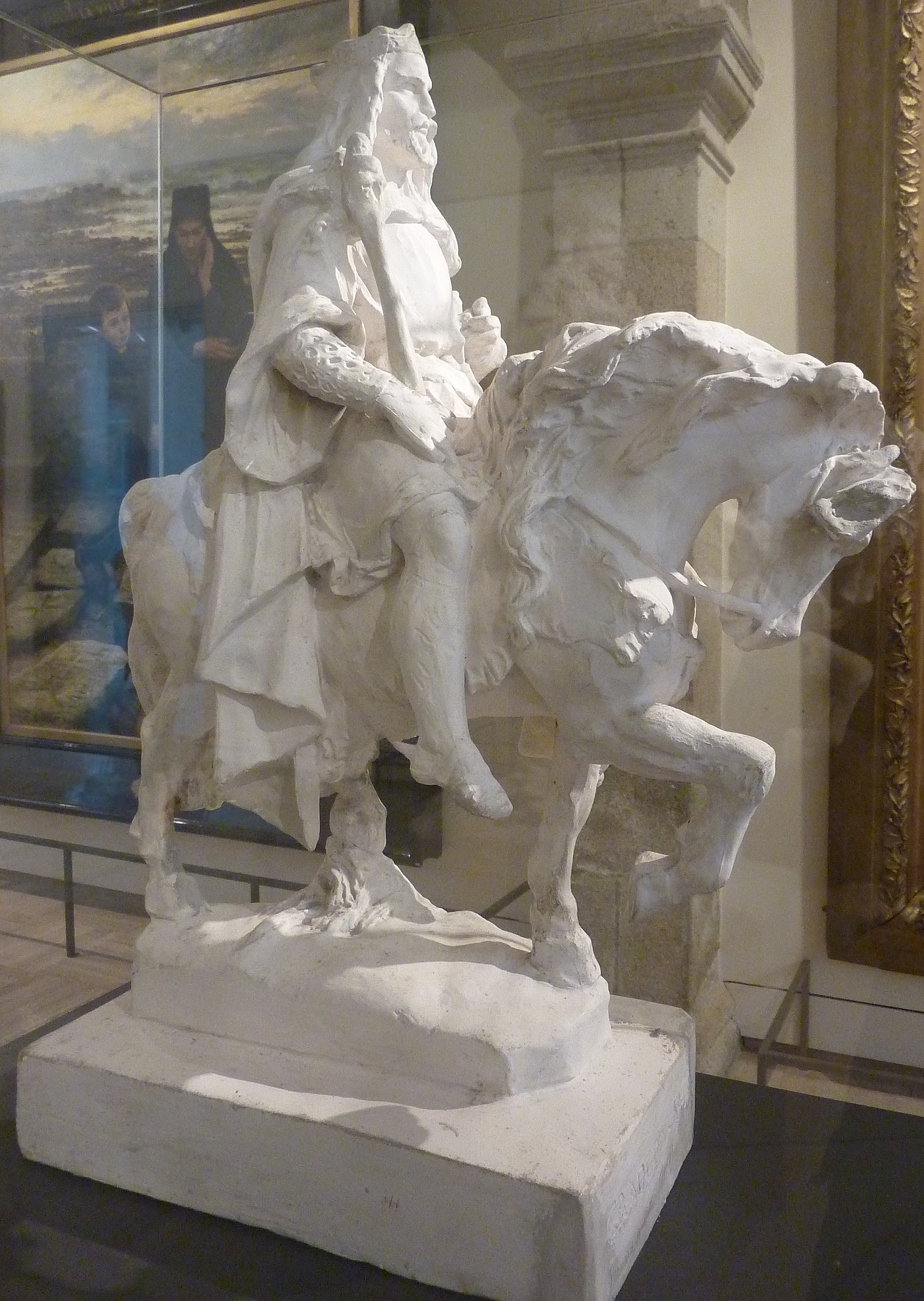
King Gradlon by Amédée-René Ménard, a plaster model (ca. 1850) for his later sculpture in granite of the same title.

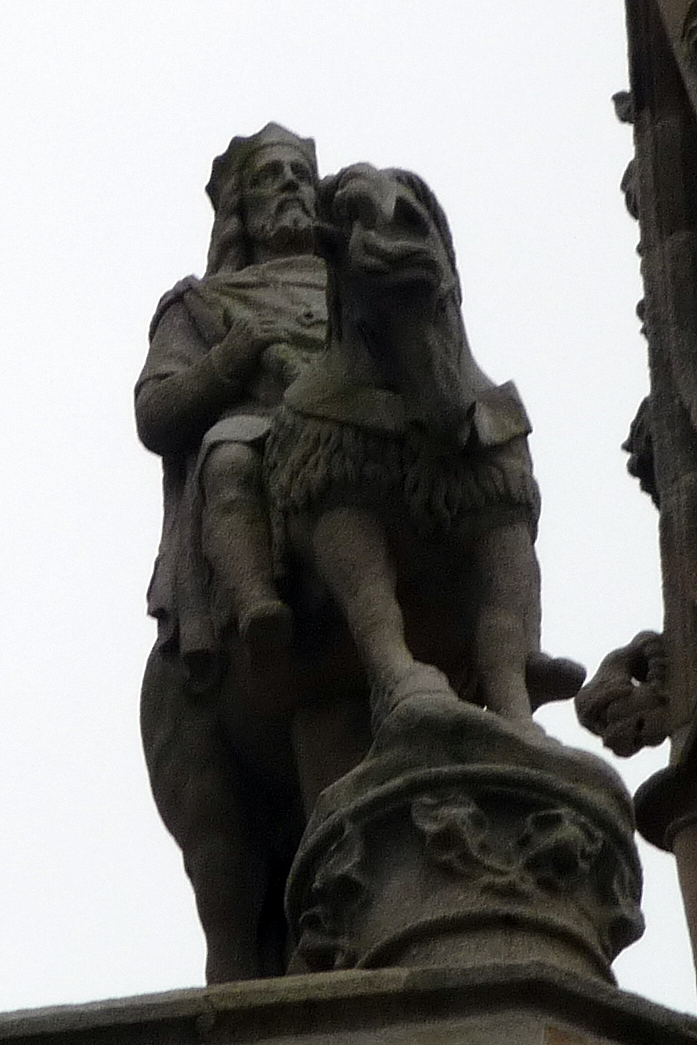
King Gradlon by Amédée-René Ménard and the sculptor Le Brun de Lorient, 1858, granite statue at the cathedral of Saint-Corentin at Quimper, France.

Amédée-René Ménard (16 October 1806 — 22 October 1873) was a French academic sculptor and art teacher.

== Biography ==
Amédée Ménard was born in Nantes, France, the son of René François Ménard, a timber merchant. He studied art with local sculptors and joined a workshop specializing in statuary. In 1825 he moved to Paris for further studies with the sculptor Étienne-Jules Ramey. He spent most of the following decade in Paris, where he showed regularly at the Salon, before returning to settle permanently in Nantes.

Ménard sculpted large statues of historical and mythological characters as well as some bas reliefs and architectural elements such as pediments. Most of his work was intended for public display outdoors or in churches, and much of his surviving work can be found in such locations. A few of his smaller pieces are in museums like the Angers Museum of Fine Arts.

He taught art at the École des Beaux-Arts in Paris and later in Nantes. Among his students in Nantes were the sculptor Charles-Auguste Lebourg and the painter Auguste Toulmouche.

The Nantes statuary will also be requested by Joseph Bigot, architect from Quimper, to sculpt, on the pediment of the facade of the Quimper Museum of Fine Arts, an allegory of painting and architecture surrounding the arms of the City, and, always at the request of the latter, will realize, for the cathedral Saint-Corentin, the recumbent figure of Monsignor Graveran (1855) or also for the equestrian granite statue of King Gradlon, executed by the sculptor Le Brun de Lorient, and inaugurated on October 10, 1858, the plaster model kept at the Museum des Beaux-Arts in Quimper.

Ménard died at home in Nantes and was buried in a nearby cemetery.

== Selected sculptures ==
- Statue of Saint Anne (1851, at the top of a staircase leading down to the Marquis d'Aiguillon wharf, Nantes)
- Mercury Inventing the Caduceus (1852)
- King Gradlon (1858, at Quimper Cathedral)
- Alain Barbetorte (1861) monumental plaster statue, which originally, located on the main staircase of the prefecture of Nantes, leading to the salons of the general council, was moved to the courtyard of the castle of the Dukes of Brittany before being vandalized in 1978. It was restored by Raffig Tullou.
- The Law and the Force (on the façade of the old courthouse, Nantes)
- Tomb figure of Bishop Joseph Marie Graveran, Quimper Cathedral
- Christ Blessing the Crowd (at Saint Emilien Church, Nantes)
- The Virgin (at Saint Anne church, Nantes)
- Bas relief on the tomb of Abbé Fresneau (at Notre Dame de Bon Port Church, Nantes)
- Bust of Joseph Chenentais, a fire marshal of Nantes
- Bust of General de Lamoricière
Œuvres d'Amédée Ménard

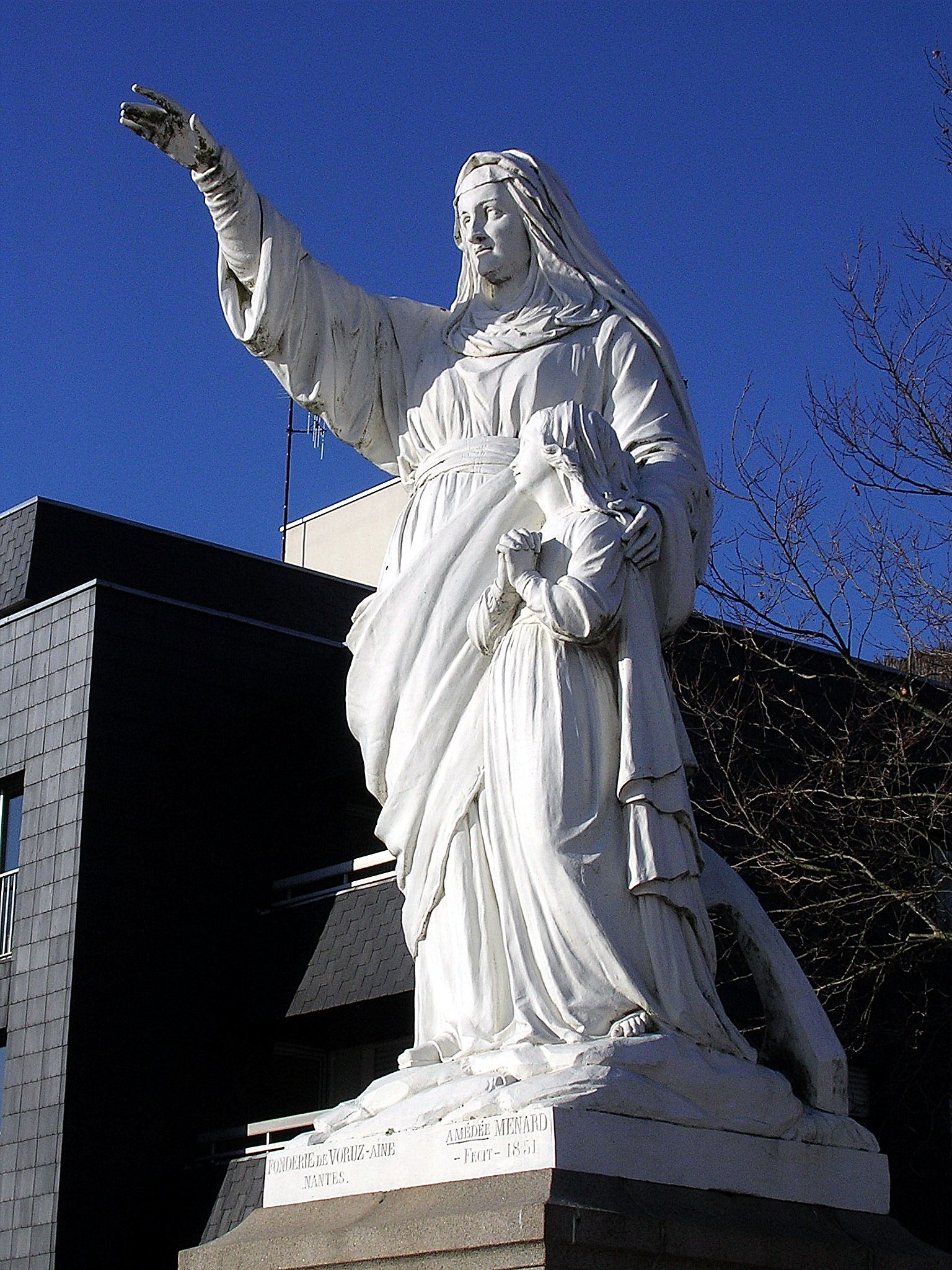
Sainte Anne (1851)
Nantes, rue de l'Hermitage.

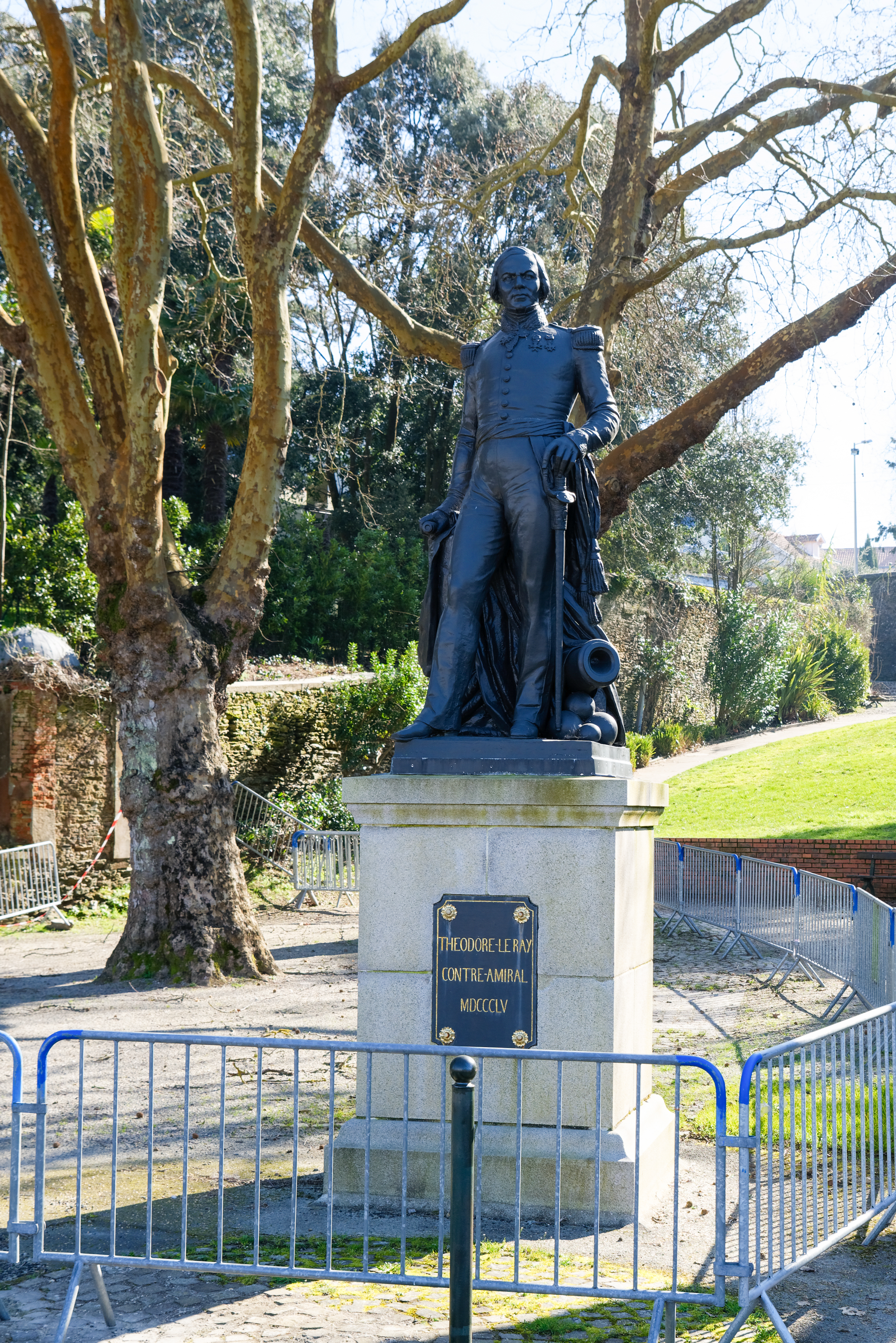
Monument à l'amiral Théodore Leray (1855), Pornic, Gourmalon garden.

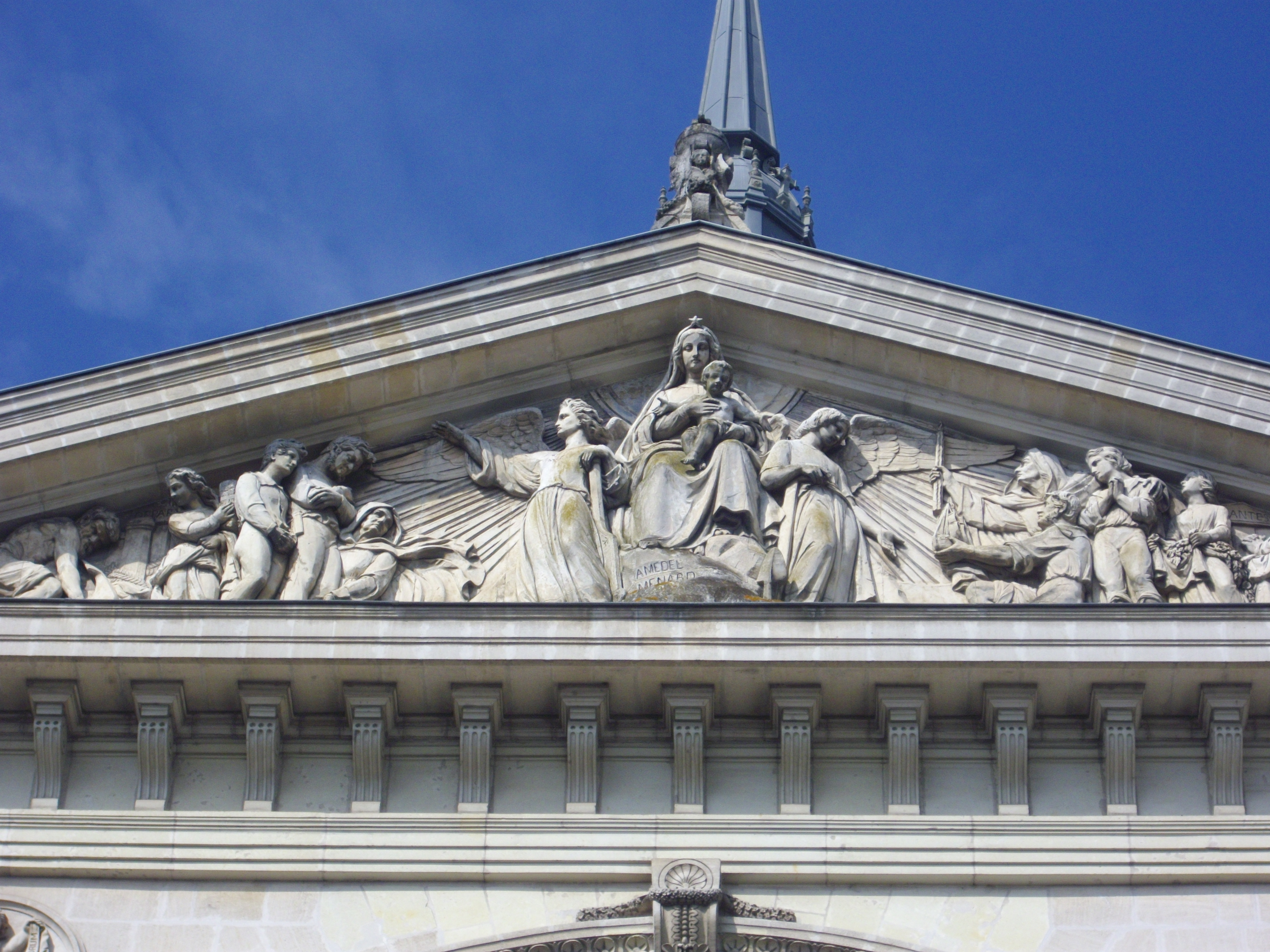
Notre-Dame protector of sailors (1858)
Pediment of the Notre-Dame de Bon-Port à Nantes.

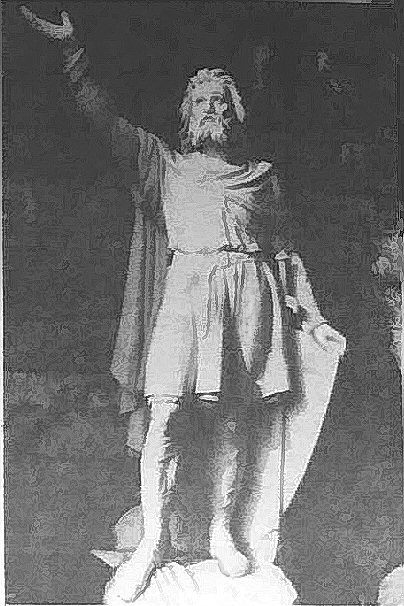
Alan Twistedbeard
in the courtyard of the castle of the Dukes of Brittany in Nantes.
