= Kredenn Geltiek =

Celtic Creed of the World Kredenn Geltiek Hollvedel
- Abbreviation: Kredenn Geltiek
- Formation: 1936
- Founder: Raffig Tullou; Morvan Marchal; Francis Bayer du Kern
- Type: Breton culture Celtic Revival; Neopaganism
- Headquarters: Brittany
- Website: druidisme.org

Kredenn Geltiek (Celtic Creed) is a neo-Pagan Druidic group founded in Brittany in 1936. It was later known as Kredenn Geltiek Hollvedel (Celtic Creed of the World). It now exists under the name Kevanvod Tud Donn (Parliament of people of Dêua Ana). It publishes the journal Ialon-Kad-Nemeton.

== History ==
Founded in 1936 by Rafig Tullou, Morvan Marchal, and Francis Bayer du Kern, Kredenn Geltiek Hollvedel emerged from the Breton Federalist Movement as an effort to revive ancient Celtic religious beliefs. The group's explicitly anti-Catholic and modern Druidic ideology aimed to set it apart from the existing non-religious Gorsedd of Brittany.

Morvan Marchal served as the group's first "Arch-Druid." They combined readings of the Bhagavad Gita and the maxims of Laozi with Celtic traditions to develop an Indo-European esotericism that formed the foundation for the revival of druidic worship. Research by the esotericist Gwilherm Berthou supported claims that ancient Celtic beliefs had been reconstructed.

During World War II, the group's journal, Kad ("Combat"), which focused on druidic philosophy, was renamed the less militaristic Nemeton ("Sanctuary"). It later became Ialon-Kad-Nemeton.

From 1937 and onward, the group underwent numerous schisms, the most recent occurring in 1994 when a faction split off and relocated to Commana.

== See also ==
- Breton nationalism
- Seiz Breur
