= Georges Bareau =

French sculptor

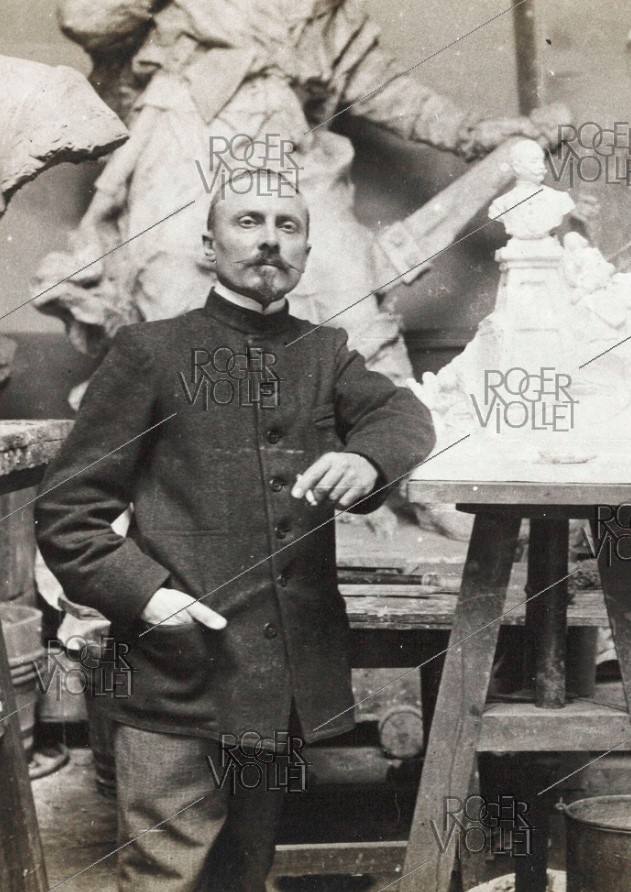
- Born: 11 April 1866; Paimbœuf
- Died: 4 January 1931 (aged 64); Nantes
- Occupation: artist

Georges Marie Valentin Bareau (11 April 1866 in Paimbœuf - 4 January 1931 in Nantes) was a French sculptor.

== Biography ==
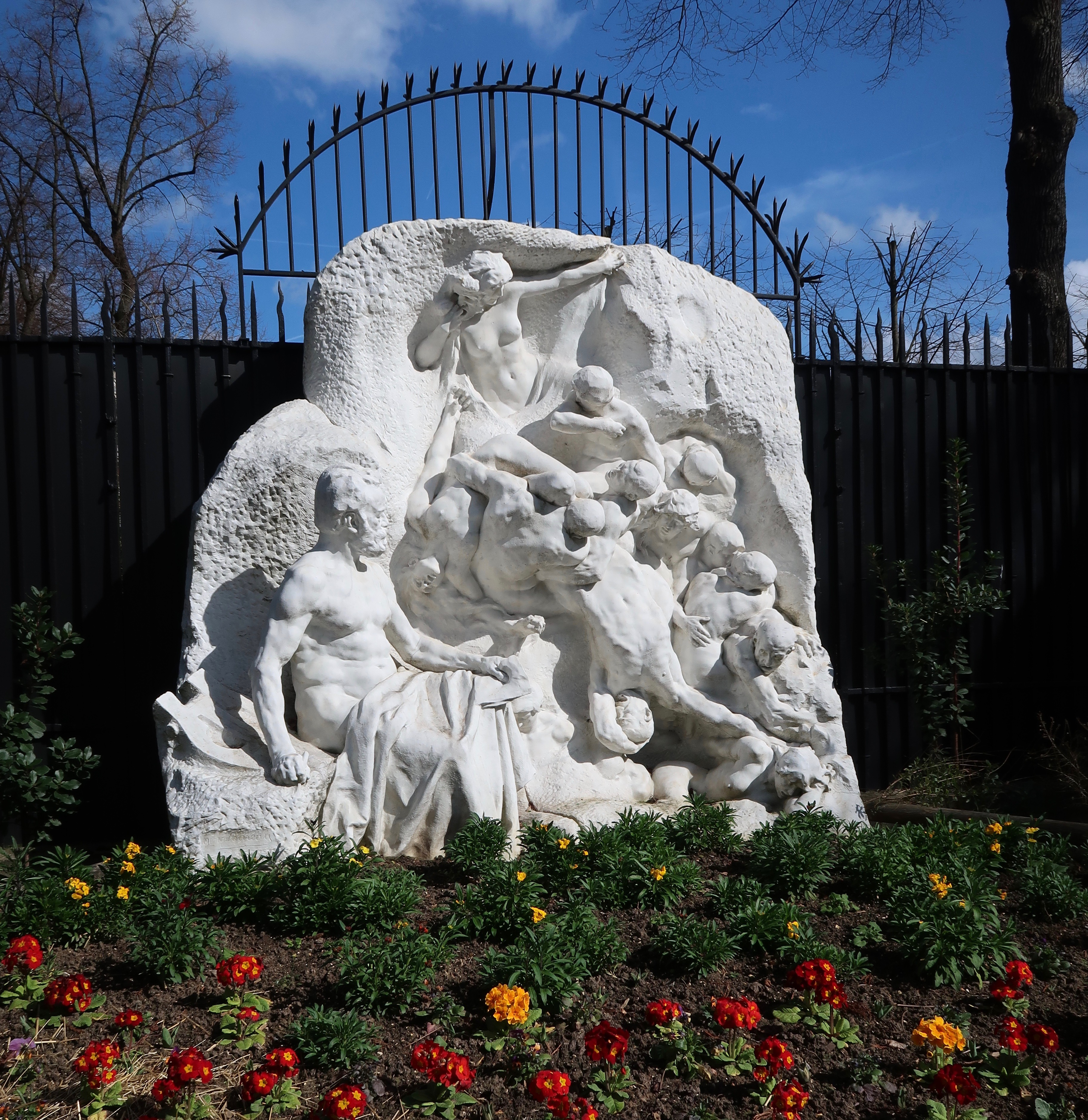
La Vision du Poète (1902), Paris, jardin du Ranelagh.

Georges Bareau's father was a carpenter in Paimbœuf.

He entered the École des beaux-arts de Paris where he was a pupil of Charles Gauthier and Gabriel-Jules Thomas. He exhibited at the Salon from 1889.

In 1893, he won a third medal at the Salon de la Société des artistes français and then, the following year, a vermeil medal at the Exposition universelle de Lyon. He was awarded the Salon prize in 1895, and at the end of the Brussels International Exhibition of 1897, he was placed out of competition. A gold medal at the 1900 Universal Exhibition in Paris crowned his career.

He was promoted to the rank of officer of the Legion of Honour in December 1906.

Georges Bareau died in Nantes on 4 January 1931 bequeathing all his works to the City of Saint-Nazaire. He is buried in Nantes at the Miséricorde Cemetery.

== Works in public collections ==
In Canada

- Quebec City, Jacques Cartier Market Square, Monument to Jacques Cartier, 1926.

In Denmark

- Copenhagen, Ny Carlsberg Glyptotek: Awakening of Humanity, plaster.

In France

- Barentin, town hall: Éveil de l'Humanité, 1906, marble, medal of honour at the 1906 Salon des artistes français.
- Courbevoie, cemetery: Monument aux Morts.
- Luçon : Monument aux morts.
- Nantes:
  - jardin des plantes : Monument to Jules Verne, 1910, bronze, sent to be melted down in 1942 under the Vichy regime, as part of the mobilisation of non-ferrous metals. The bronze bust was replaced in 1945 by a stone bust made by Jean Mazuet.
  - Monument aux morts de la guerre de 1870, summit group Pour le drapeau, 1897. The model was exhibited at the 1895 Salon.
  - musée des beaux-arts :
    - La Mort de Léandre, marble. The plaster model obtained a third class medal at the 1893 Salon;
    - Time creating Wisdom, marble.
- Paris :
  - Grand Palais, façade: L'Art asiatique, stone statue.
  - The Ranelagh garden : The Vision of the Poet, 1902, high relief in marble, in homage to Victor Hugo.
- Péronne, Musée Alfred-Danicourt: Le Temps créant la Sagesse, 1904, bronze (Note: Dedication on the plaque of the base: Offered to Moscow Charles Boulanger, Mayor of Péronne by the Municipal Council, the administrators of the hospice, the directors of the Caisse d'Epargne on the occasion of his promotion to the rank of officer of the Legion of Honour.)
- Ploërmel : Monument to Alphonse Guérin, 1896, bronze, sent for casting under the Vichy regime, as part of the mobilisation of non-ferrous metals.
- Saint-Étienne : Monument to José Frappa, 1912.
- Saint-Lô, musée des beaux-arts: Madame X, 1904, marble bust.
- Saint-Malo, remparts: Monument to Jacques Cartier, 1905.
- Saint-Nazaire : Monument to Fernand Gasnier, 1912, bronze, sent to be melted down under the Vichy regime, as part of the mobilisation of non-ferrous metals.
- Tours, hôtel de ville: Jean Fouquet and Jean Briçonnet, 1899, statues in stone cement.
- Villeneuve-sur-Lot : Monument aux morts de la guerre de 1870, known as Pour le drapeau, 1923, Barbedienne cast iron.

=== Fonts of edition ===
The majority of these were made by the foundry workshop of Ferdinand Barbedienne.

- David in front of Saul, Salon of 1893
- The Conqueror, 1894
- L'Appel des armes
- Poetry
- Diana Riding an Eagle
- "Allegory of History".
- Vox Pacis
- The Falconer
- Fortune
- Allegory of Letters *
- Figure of a ploughman *
- The Blacksmith
Works by Georges Bareau

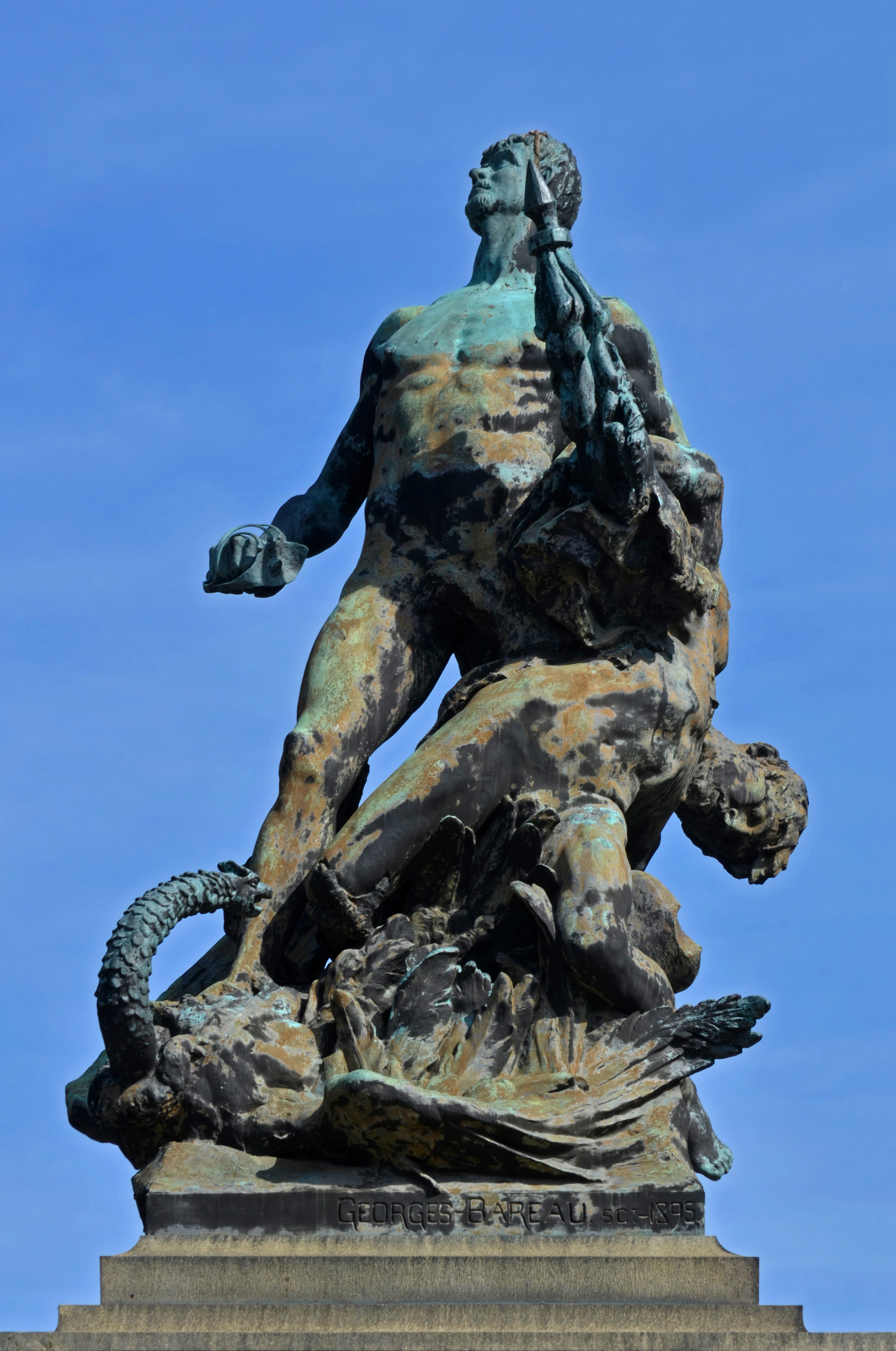
Pour le drapeau, top group of the Monument to the dead of the 1870 war (1897), Nantes.

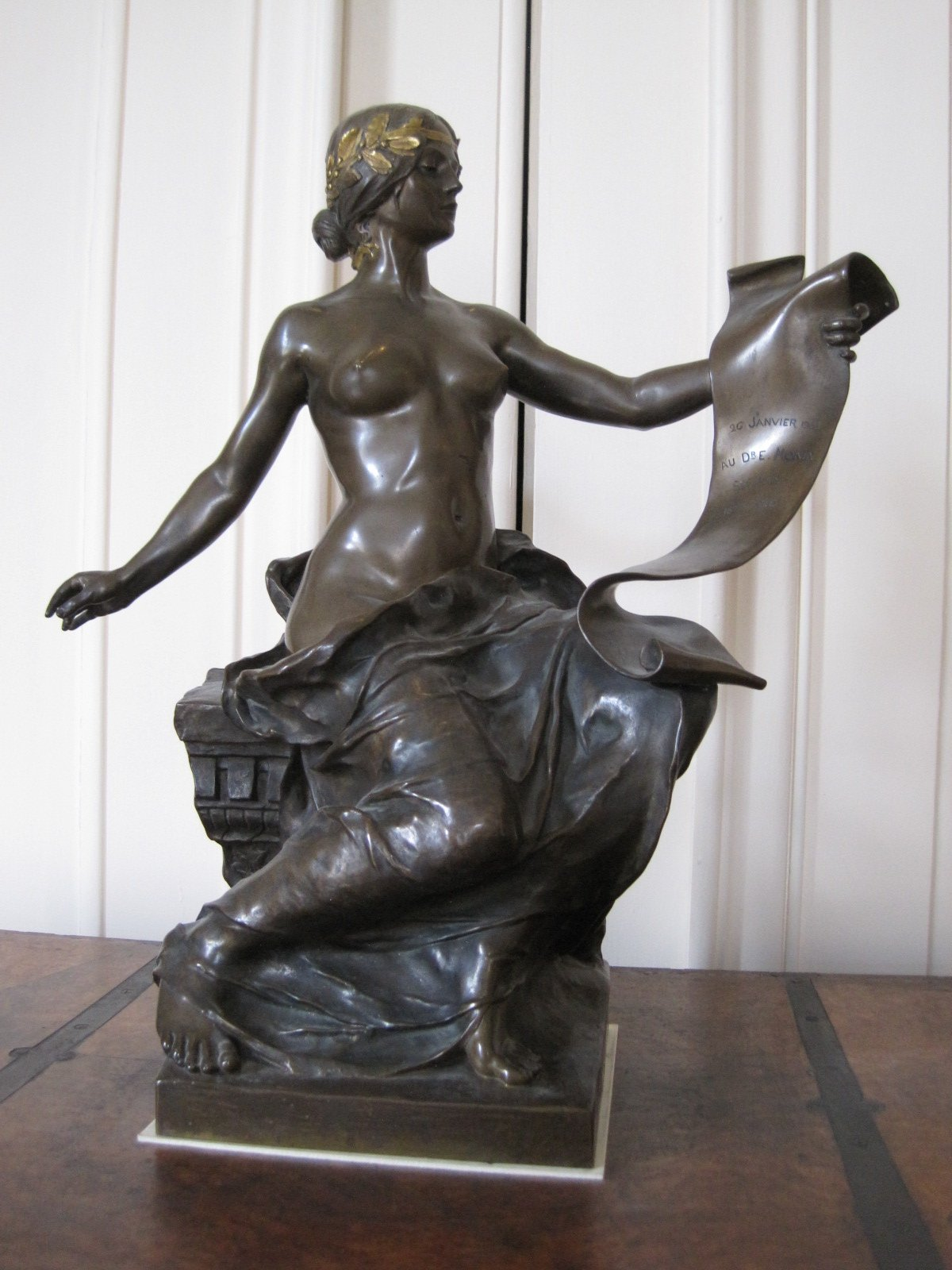
L'Histoire (circa 1900), Musée des beaux-arts de Besançon.

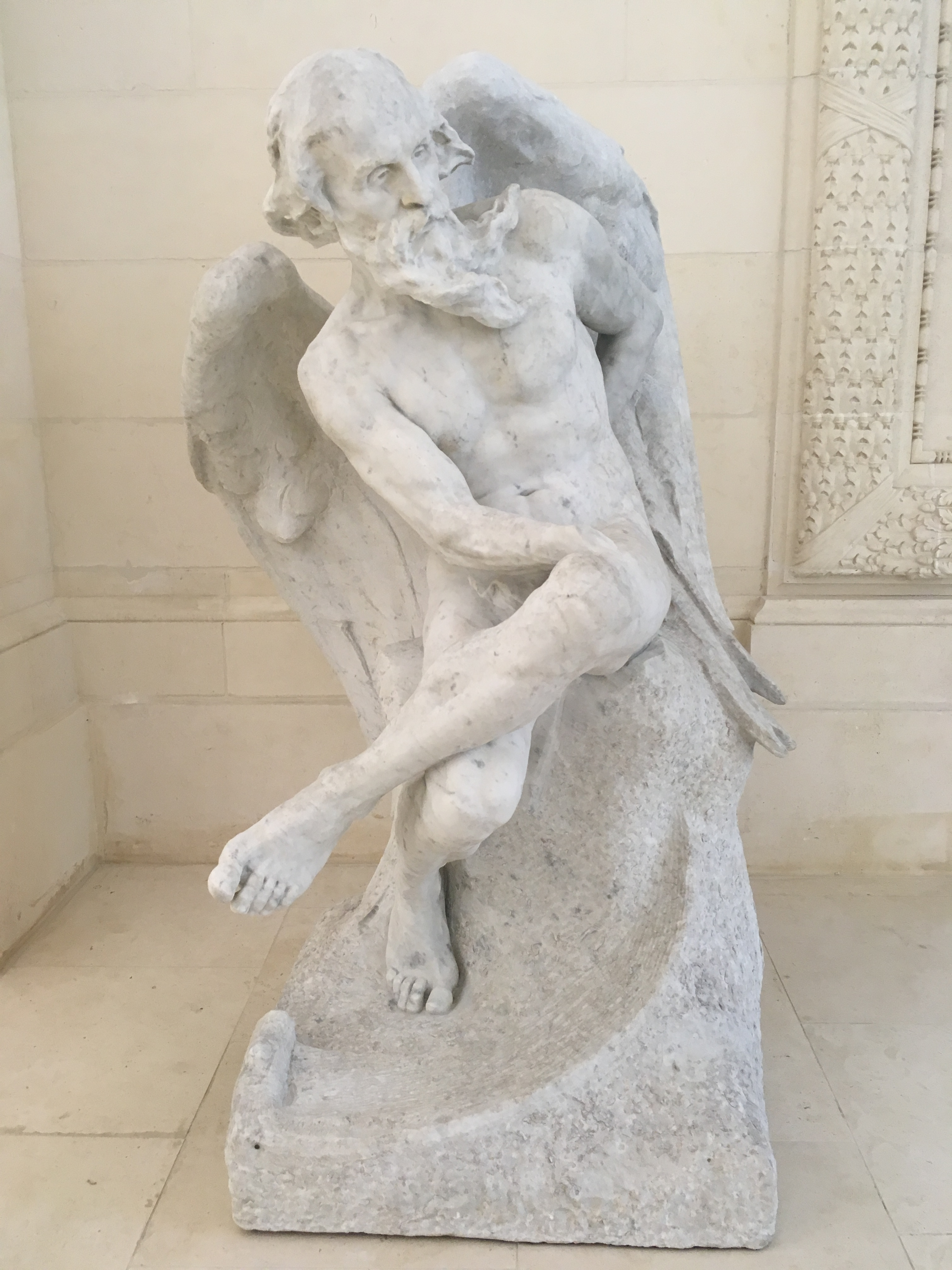
Le Temps créant la Sagesse (1902), marble, musée des beaux-arts de Nantes.

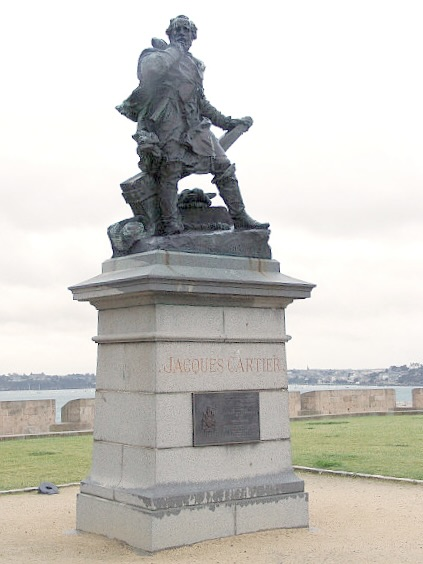
Monument to Jacques Cartier (1905), remparts of Saint-Malo.

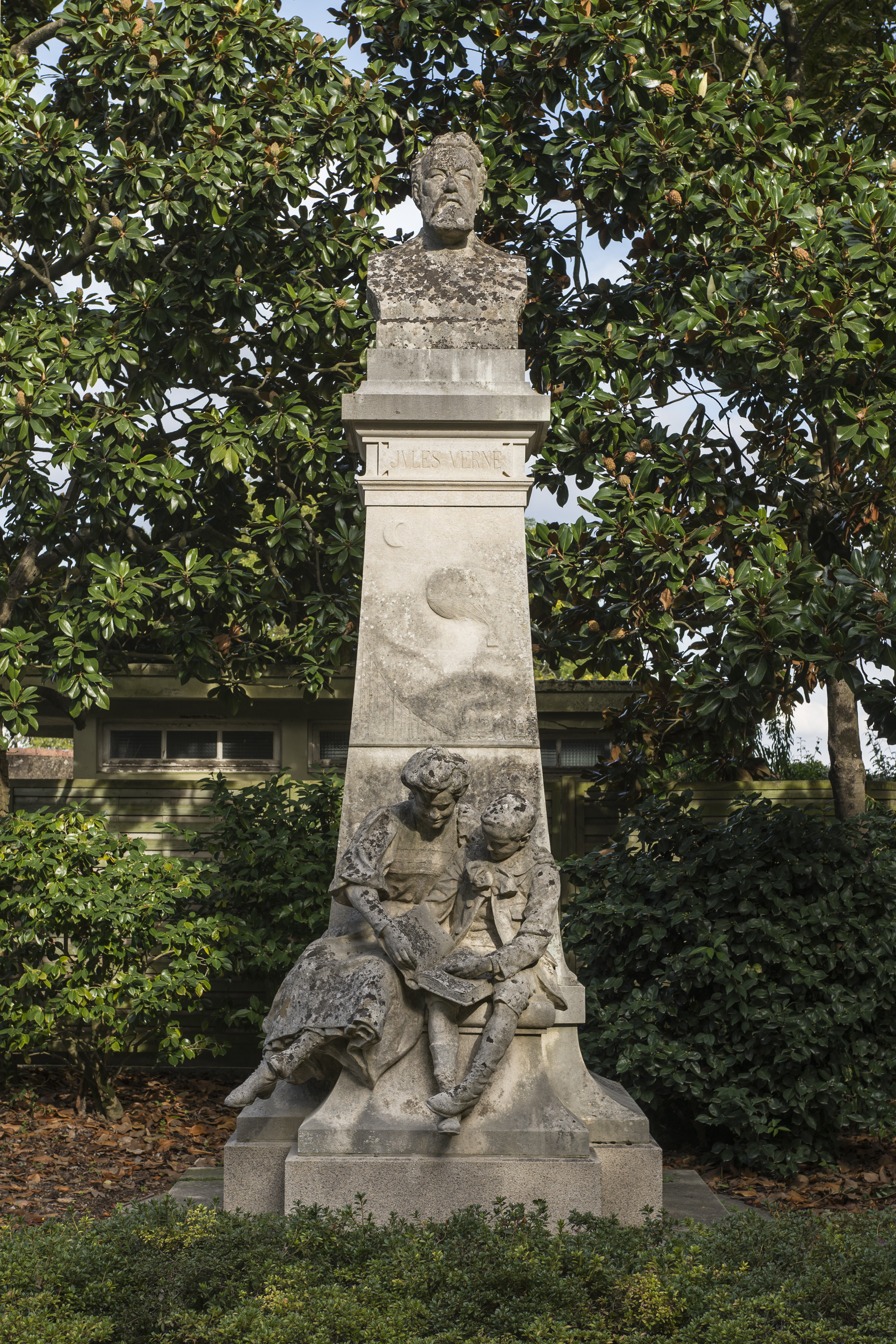
Monument to Jules Verne (1910) jardin des plantes de Nantes. The bust of Jules Verne (1945) is by Jean Mazuet.
