= Morvan Marchal =

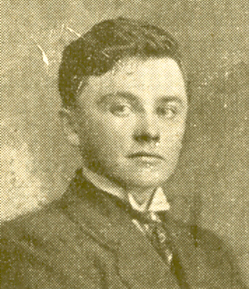
- Born: 31 July 1900; Vitré, Ille-et-Vilaine
- Died: 13 August 1963 (aged 63); Paris
- Notable work: flag of Brittany
- Movement: Seiz Breur

Morvan Marchal (French pronunciation: [mɔʁvɑ̃ maʁʃal]; 31 July 1900, Vitré, Ille-et-Vilaine – 13 August 1963, Paris; also known as Maurice Marchal) was an architect and a prominent member of the Breton national movement. He is best known for having designed the national flag of Brittany.

== Biography ==
Marchal's design for the flag of Brittany.

A former pupil of the Saint Martin's day college of Rennes, Marchal went on to study architecture at the Rennes School of Art. In 1918 he joined the Breton Regionalist Union and became involved with its journal Breiz Atao ("Brittany Always!") and the nationalist youth movement Breton Youth.

In 1923 he designed the Breton national flag Gwenn ha Du ("Black and White"). An artist, poet and illustrator, he participated in many Breton publications, political and intellectual. He also belonged to Seiz Breur, a group of Breton artists.

He took part in the creation of the Breton Autonomist Party (PAB) at the first congress of Breiz Atao, held in September 1927 at Rosporden. He was a member of the party's management committee. In constant conflict with the more radical faction led by Olier Mordrel, he finally broke with Breiz Atao.

At the 11 April 1931 congress, the PAB split. Mordrel set up the Breton National Party, and Marchal joined the moderate Breton Federalist League, from which in 1932 he founded the journal Federal Brittany. In 1934, he joined the Breton Federalist Movement. In 1938 he signed the manifesto of the Breton federalists, which affirmed opposition to any association of Brittany with reaction, capitalism or racism.

Marchal turned to philosophical, occult and neo-druidic studies. With other members of the Breton Federalist Movement, he founded the neo-pagan Kredenn Geltiek Hollvedel (World Celtic Creed) group, of which he was the first arch-druid.

== Wartime activity and later life ==
During the German occupation, Marchal worked as an architect in Laval. He directed the neo-druidic review Nemeton (1942–1943, in collaboration with Rafig Tullou) and joined the Rassemblement national populaire (RNP) of Marcel Déat. Historians such as Kristian Hamon and Sébastien Carney situate these activities within the broader context of Breton cultural collaborationism during the Occupation.

Following the Liberation of France he suffered from the general association of Breton nationalism with collaboration. He was sentenced to 15 years of national indignity by the Civic Chamber in Rennes but was amnestied in 1951. Some defenders, including fellow Freemasons, claimed his wartime engagements had served as cover for Resistance activities.

He left Brittany to live in Paris, where he worked installing gas appliances. He died in poverty on 13 August 1963 in the common room of Lariboisière Hospital. His remains were later transferred to the family grave in Châteaugiron, near Rennes.

A street in the Poultière district of Vitré is named after him.

== Bibliography ==
The Breton movement. Published by real Brittany 1954
