= Brittany =

Cultural area in northwestern France

Brittany Breizh (Breton) Bretagne (French) Bertaèyn/Bertègn (Gallo)
- Historical province
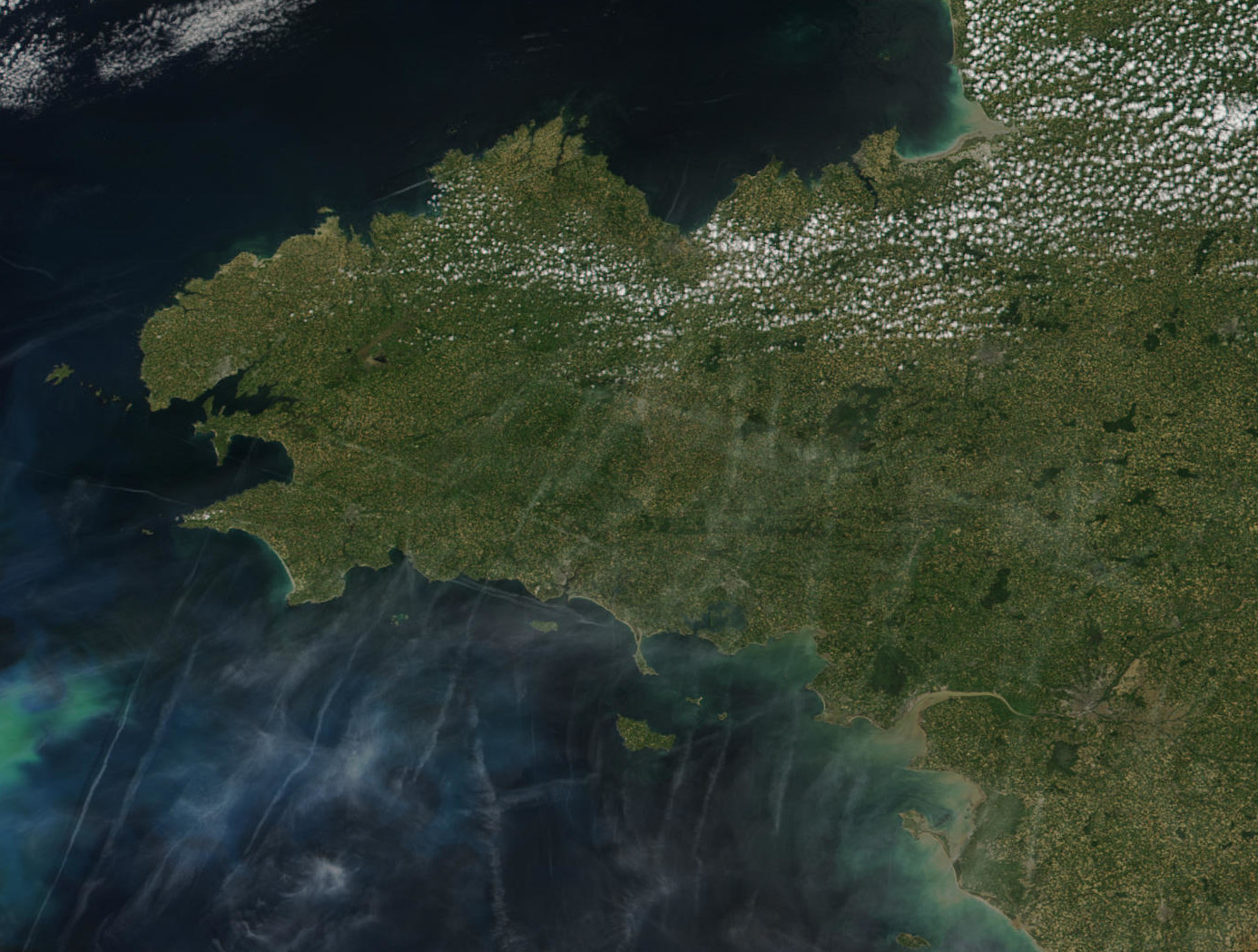
- Brittany from space, 2002

- Flag Coat of arms
- Motto: None (de jure); Historical: Kentoc'h mervel eget bezañ saotret Rather death than dishonour (de facto)
- Anthem: "Bro Gozh ma Zadoù"
- Coordinates: 48°00′N 3°00′W
- Country: France
- Largest city: Nantes
- Largest settlements: List: Nantes; Rennes; Brest; Saint-Nazaire; Quimper; Lorient; Vannes; Saint-Malo; Saint-Brieuc; Lannion

Area
  - Total: 34,023 km^{2} (13,136 sq mi)

Population (2026)
  - Total: 4,997,670
- Demonym: Bretons

GDP
  - Total: €126.549 billion (2024)
  - Per capita: €36,271 (2024)
- Time zone: UTC+1 (CET)
  - Summer (DST): UTC+2 (CEST)
- ISO 3166 code: FR-E

- Person: Breton (Breton) (Berton)
- People: Bretons (Bretoned) (Bertons)
- Language: Breton (Brezhoneg) (Berzonèqe), Gallo (Gallaoueg) (Galo)
- Country: Brittany (Breizh) (Bertègn)

Brittany (/ˈbrɪtəni/ BRIT-ən-ee) (Note: French: Bretagne, pronounced [bʁətaɲ]; Breton: Breizh, pronounced [bʁɛjs, bʁɛx]; Gallo: Bertaèyn or Bertègn, pronounced [bəʁtaɛɲ]) is a peninsula, historical region and cultural area in the north-west of modern France, covering the western part of what was known as Armorica in Roman Gaul. It became an independent kingdom and then a duchy before being united with the Kingdom of France in 1532 as a province governed as a separate nation under the crown. Brittany is the traditional homeland of the Breton people and is one of the six Celtic nations, retaining a distinct cultural identity that reflects its history.

Brittany has also been referred to as Little Britain (as opposed to Great Britain, with which it shares an etymology). It is bordered by the English Channel to the north, Normandy to the northeast, eastern Pays de la Loire to the southeast, the Bay of Biscay to the south, and the Celtic Sea and the Atlantic Ocean to the west. Its land area is 34,023 km^{2} (13,136 sq mi).

Brittany is the site of some of the world's oldest standing architecture, home to the Cairn of Barnenez, the Tumulus Saint-Michel and others, which date to the early 5th millennium BC. The historical province of Brittany is split among five French departments: Finistère in the west, Côtes-d'Armor in the north, Ille-et-Vilaine in the northeast, Morbihan in the south and Loire-Atlantique in the southeast. Loire-Atlantique now belongs to the Pays de la Loire region while the other four departments make up the Brittany region.

In 2026, the population of historic Brittany was estimated to be 4,997,670. In 2017, the largest metropolitan areas were Nantes (934,165 inhabitants), Rennes (733,320 inhabitants), and Brest (321,364 inhabitants).

A nationalist movement seeks greater autonomy within the French Republic, or independence from it. The reunification of Brittany is supported by half of the inhabitants of Brittany and of Loire-Atlantique, and is considered a prerequisite to further autonomy.

== Etymology ==
The word Brittany, along with its French, Breton and Gallo equivalents Bretagne, Breizh and Bertaèyn, derive from the Latin Britannia, which means 'land of the Britons'. This word had been used by the Romans since the 1st century to refer to Great Britain, and more specifically the Roman province of Britain. This word derives from a Greek word Πρεττανική, Prettanikḗ or Βρεττανίαι, Brettaníai, used by Pytheas, an explorer from Massalia who visited the British Isles around 320 BC. The Greek word itself comes from the common Brythonic ethnonym reconstructed as *Pritanī, itself from Proto-Celtic *kʷritanoi (ultimately from Proto-Indo-European *kʷer- 'to cut, make').

In Roman times, Armorica included what is now Brittany. This was an indefinite region that extended along the English Channel coast from the Seine estuary, then along the Atlantic coast to the Loire estuary and, according to several sources, maybe to the Garonne estuary. This term probably comes from a Gallic word, aremorica, which means 'close to the sea'. Another name, Letauia (in English "Litavis"), was used until the 12th century. It possibly means 'wide and flat' or 'to expand' and it gave the Welsh name for Brittany, Llydaw.

After the fall of the Western Roman Empire, many Cornish Britons settled in western Armorica to escape the Saxons and the region started to be called Britannia, although this name only replaced Armorica in the sixth century or perhaps by the end of the fifth.

Breton-speaking people may pronounce the word Breizh in two different ways, according to their region of origin. Breton can be divided into two main dialects: the KLT (Kerne-Leon-Trégor) and the dialect of the Vannetais. KLT speakers pronounce it [brɛjs] and would write it Breiz, while the Vannetais speakers pronounce it [brɛχ] and would write it Breih. The official spelling Breizh is a compromise between both variants. In 1941, efforts to unify the dialects led to the creation of the so-called Breton zh, a standard which has never been widely accepted. Gallo, on the other hand, has never had a widely accepted orthography, and several coexist. For instance, the name of the region in that language can be written Bertaèyn in ELG orthography, or Bertègn in MOGA, and a couple of other orthographies also exist.

== History ==
=== Prehistoric origins ===
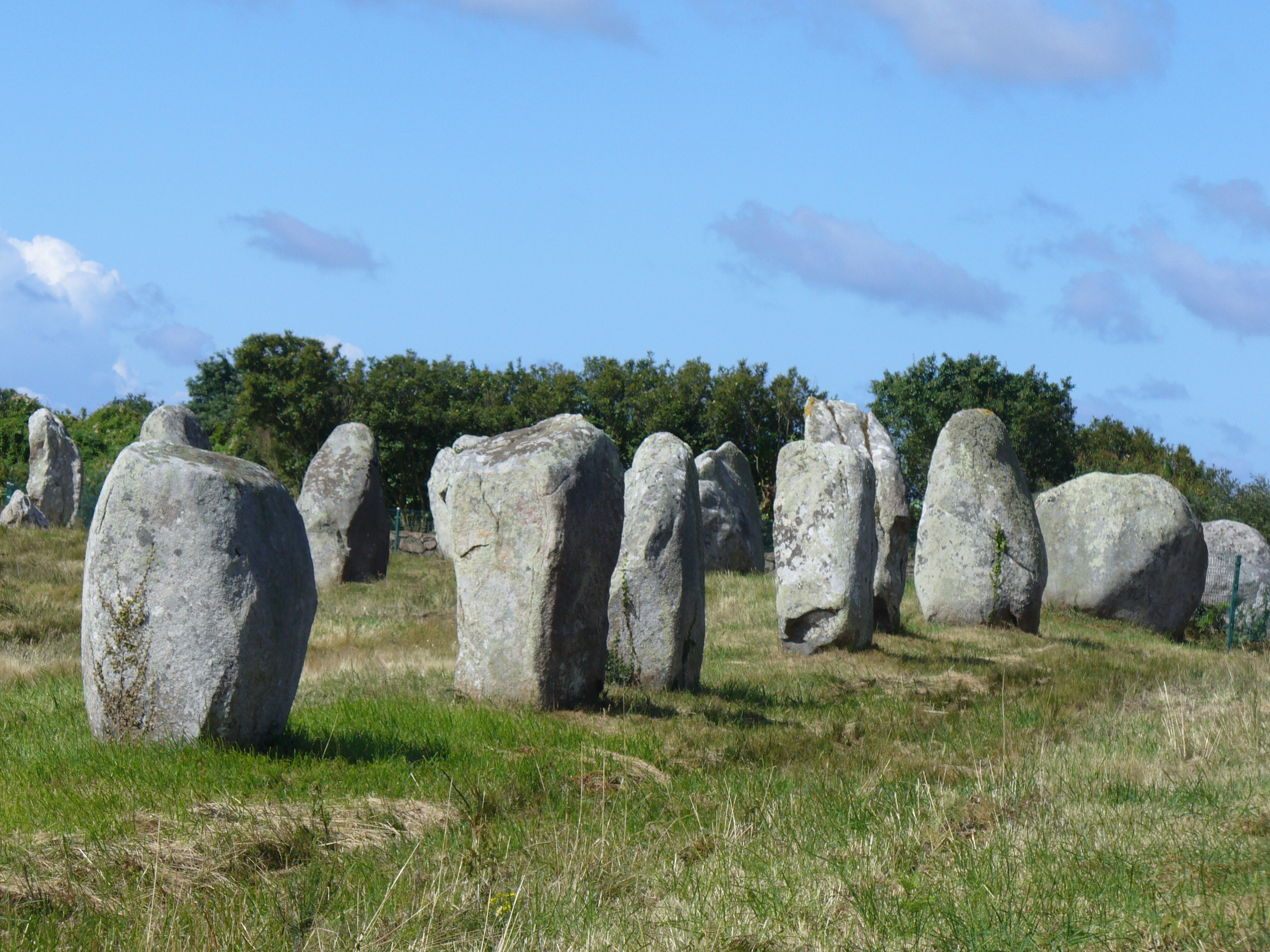
The Carnac stones

Brittany has been inhabited by humans since the Lower Palaeolithic. This population was scarce and very similar to the other Neanderthals found in the whole of Western Europe. Their only original feature was a distinct culture, called the "Colombanian". One of the oldest hearths in the world has been found in Plouhinec, Finistère.

Homo sapiens settled in Brittany around 35,000 years ago. They replaced or absorbed the Neanderthals and developed local industries, similar to the Châtelperronian or to the Magdalenian. After the last glacial period, the warmer climate allowed the area to become heavily wooded. At that time, Brittany was populated by relatively large communities who started to change their lifestyles from a life of hunting and gathering, to become settled farmers. Agriculture was introduced during the 5th millennium BC by migrants from the south and east. However, the Neolithic Revolution in Brittany did not happen due to a radical change of population, but by slow immigration and exchange of skills.

Neolithic Brittany is characterised by important megalithic production and sites such as Quelfénnec, it is sometimes designated as the "core area" of megalithic culture. The oldest monuments, cairns, were followed by princely tombs and stone rows. The Morbihan département, on the southern coast, comprises a large share of these structures, including the Carnac stones and the Broken Menhir of Er Grah in the Locmariaquer megaliths, the largest single stone erected by Neolithic people.

=== Gallic era ===
The five Gallic tribes of Brittany

During the protohistorical period, Brittany was inhabited by five Celtic tribes:

- The Curiosolitae, who lived around the present town of Corseul. Their territory encompassed parts of Côtes-d'Armor, Ille-et-Vilaine and Morbihan départements.
- The Namnetes, who lived in the current Loire-Atlantique département (in today's administrative région of Pays de la Loire), north of the Loire. They gave their name to the city of Nantes. The south bank of the river was occupied by an allied tribe, the Ambilatres, whose existence and territory remain unsure.
- The Osismii, who lived in the western part of Brittany. Their territory comprised the Finistère département and the western extremity of Côtes-d'Armor and Morbihan.
- The Redones (or Rhedones), who lived in the eastern part of the Ille-et-Vilaine département. They gave their name to the city of Rennes (Roazhon in Breton language, in the centre of the département) and to the town of Redon (in the south of the département, bordering the département of Loire-Atlantique in the administrative région of Pays de la Loire, where its suburb town of Saint-Nicolas-de-Redon is located; however the city of Redon was founded around AD 832 under the initial name of Riedones, long after the Redones people were assimilated to Bretons; the cultural link between Riedones and the former Redones people is highly probable but difficult to recover and the name of Riedones may have been written from a local usage preserving the name of the former people in the vernacular oral language from a reading of an ancient Greek orthography).
- The Veneti, who lived in the present Morbihan département and gave their name to the city of Vannes. Despite confusion by the classical scholar Strabo, they were unrelated to the Adriatic Veneti.

Those people had strong economic ties to the Insular Celts, especially for the tin trade. Several tribes also belonged to an "Armorican confederation" which, according to Julius Caesar, gathered the Curiosolitae, the Redones, the Osismii, the Unelli, the Caletes, the Lemovices and the Ambibarii. The Unelli, Caletes, and Lemovices were respectively located in Cotentin (Lower-Normandy), pays de Caux (Upper-Normandy), and Limousin (Aquitaine); the location of the Ambibarii is unknown. The Caletes are sometimes also considered Belgians, and Lemovices is probably a mistake for Lexovii (Lower-Normandy).

=== Gallo-Roman era ===
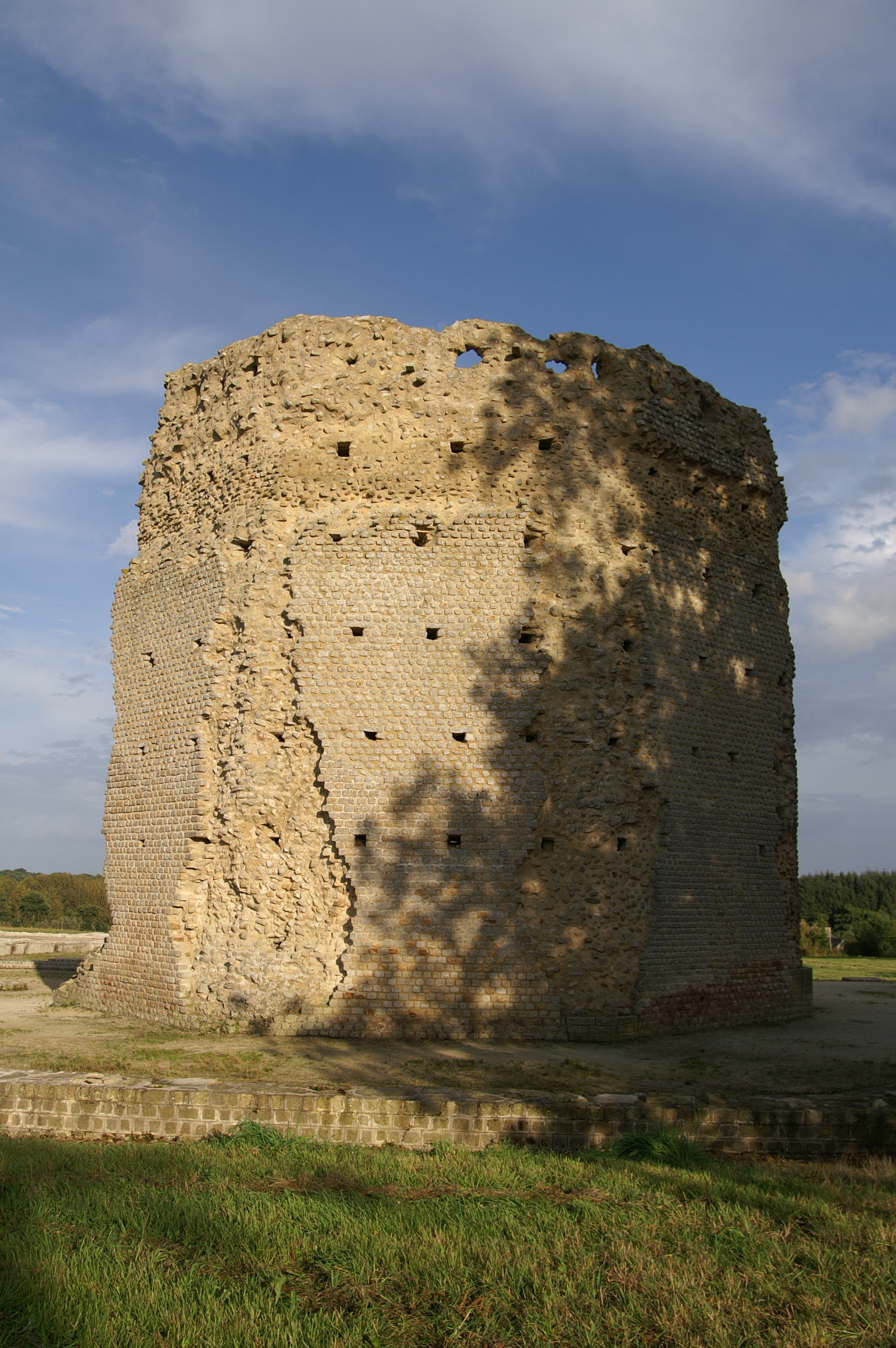
The temple of Mars in Corseul

During the Gallic Wars, the Veneti were defeated in the Battle of Morbihan off the coast of Brittany. At the conclusion of the Gallic Wars, the region became part of the Roman Republic in 51 BC. It was included in the province of Gallia Lugdunensis in 13 BC. Gallic towns and villages were redeveloped according to Roman standards, and several cities were created. These cities are Condate (Rennes), Vorgium (Carhaix), Darioritum (Vannes) and Condevincum or Condevicnum (Nantes). Together with Fanum Martis (Corseul), they were the capitals of the local civitates. They all had a grid plan and a forum, and sometimes a temple, a basilica, thermae or an aqueduct, like Carhaix.

The Romans also built three major roads through the region. However, most of the population remained rural. The free peasants lived in small huts, whereas the landowners and their employees lived in proper villae rusticae. The Gallic deities continued to be worshipped, and were often assimilated to the Roman gods. Only a small number of statues depicting Roman gods were found in Brittany, and most of the time they combine Celtic elements.

During the 3rd century AD, the region was attacked several times by Franks, Alamanni and pirates. At the same time, the local economy collapsed and many farming estates were abandoned. To face the invasions, many towns and cities were fortified, like Nantes, Rennes and Vannes.

This area was also affected by the Bagaudae (also spelled bacaudae) during this period, which were groups of peasant insurgents. The Bagaudae achieved some temporary and scattered successes under the leadership of peasants as well as former members of local ruling elites.

A French map of the traditional regions of Brittany in Ancien Régime France. The earlier state of Domnonia or Domnonée that united Brittany comprised the counties along the north coast

=== Immigration of the Britons ===
Towards the end of the 4th century, the Britons of Dumnonia (modern Devon and Cornwall) on the South-Western peninsula of Great Britain began to emigrate to Armorica, (Note: Leon Fleuriot's primarily linguistic researches in Les Origines de la Bretagne, emphasizes instead the broader influx of Britons into Roman Gaul that preceded the fifth-century collapse of Roman power.) which is why the Breton language is more closely related to recorded Cornish.

==== The Romano-Britons ====
The history behind such an establishment is unclear, but medieval Breton, Angevin and Welsh sources connect it to a figure known as Conan Meriadoc. Welsh literary sources assert that Conan came to Armorica on the orders of the Roman usurper Magnus Maximus, (Note: Magnus Maximus was a native of Galicia in Spain, being born on the estate of Count Theodosius.) who sent some of his British troops to Gaul to enforce his claims and settled them in Armorica. This account was supported by the Counts of Anjou, who claimed descent from a Roman soldier (Note: Presumably this soldier was in the employ of Gratian.) expelled from Lower Brittany by Conan on Magnus's orders.

==== Battle of the Catalaunian Plains ====
The army recruited for Flavius Aetius to combat Attila the Hun at the Battle of the Catalaunian Plains included Romans, Visigoths, Franks, Alans and Armoricans, amongst others. The Alans were placed front and centre, opposite the Huns. The Armoricans supplied archers who attacked the Huns' front lines during the main battle and thwarted Attila's night assault on the Roman camp with a hail of arrows "like rain". After the battle was won, Aetius sent the Alans to Armorica and Galicia.

==== Riothamus ====
The late 5th century Brittonic leader Riothamus received correspondence from the eminent Roman jurist Sidonius Apollinaris and was called "King of the Britons" by Jordanes. Some suggest that he was a Breton, though others believe that he was from Britain, pointing to the passage that he arrived in the land of the Biturges "by way of Ocean", which would hardly have been efficient or required for a Breton. Both historians describe Riothamus's losing battle against King Euric of the Visigoths at Déols around the year 470.

In response to a plea from the Roman Emperor Anthemius, Riothamus had led twelve thousand men to establish a military presence in Bourges in central Gaul, but was betrayed by Arvandus, the Praetorian Prefect of Gaul, and subsequently ambushed by Euric's army. (Note: The Visigoths' version of events was that they had saved the Roman empire from a British invasion.) After a long battle, the Armorican survivors escaped to Avallon in Burgundy, after which they are lost to history. According to Breton king-lists, Riotham survived and reigned as Prince of Domnonia until his death sometime between 500 and 520, though this may have been a different person.

==== Additional waves of Britons ====
Brythonic (British Celtic) settlement increased during the Anglo-Saxon settlement of Britain in the 5th and 6th centuries to seek refuge from the Anglo-Saxon invaders. It is from this event that Brittany derives its name.

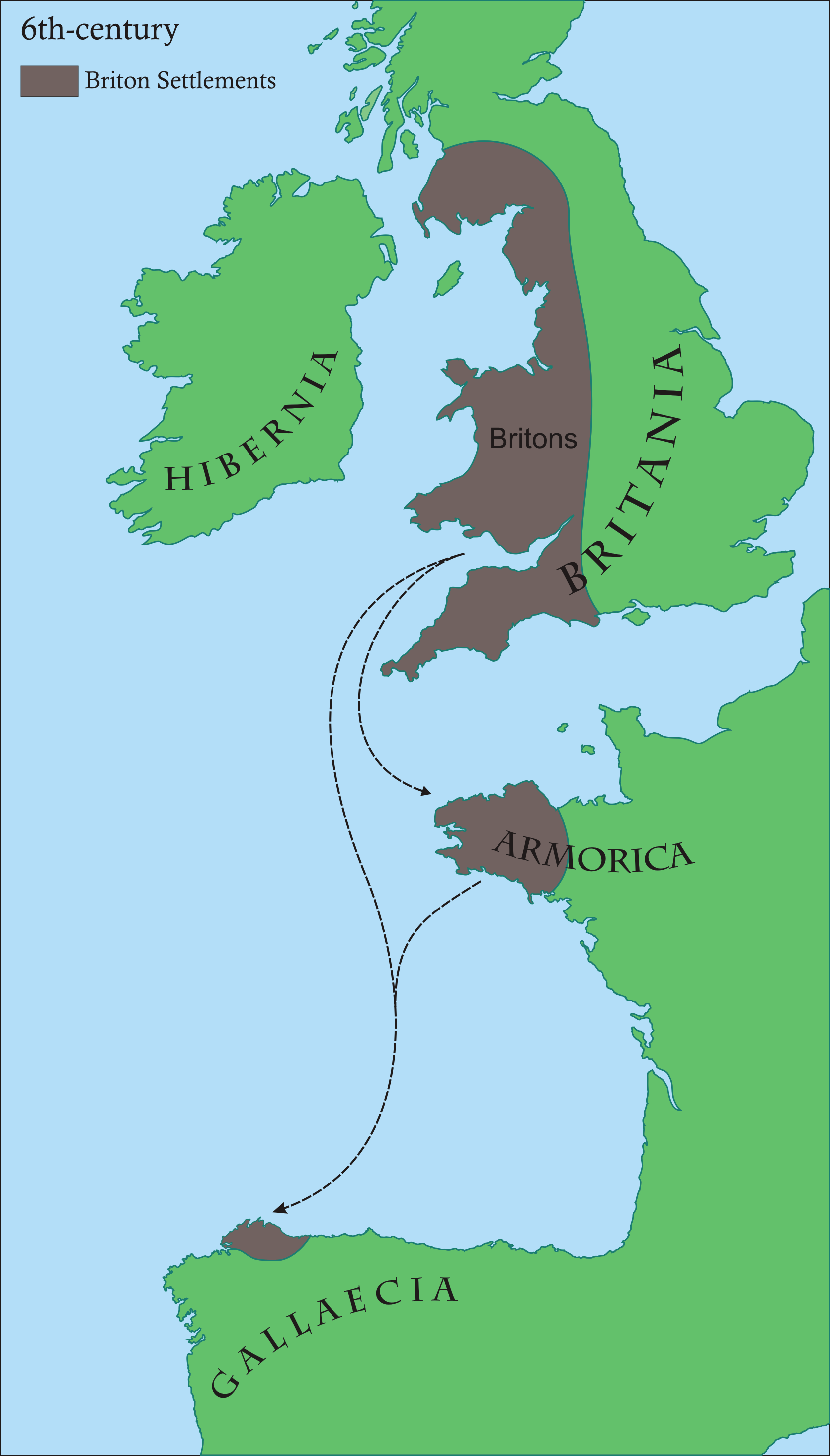
The Brythonic community around the 6th century. The sea was a communication medium rather than a barrier.

Scholars such as Léon Fleuriot have suggested a two-wave model of migration from Britain which saw the emergence of an independent Breton people and established the dominance of the Brythonic Breton language in Armorica. Their petty kingdoms are now known by the names of the counties that succeeded them—Domnonée (Devon), Cornouaille (Cornwall), Léon (Caerleon); but these names in Breton and Latin are in most cases identical to their British homelands. (In Breton and French, however, Gwened or Vannetais continued the name of the indigenous Veneti.) Although the details remain confused, these colonies consisted of related and intermarried dynasties which repeatedly unified (as by the 7th-century Saint Judicaël) before splintering again according to Celtic inheritance practices.

=== Middle Ages ===
==== The Kingdom of Brittany ====
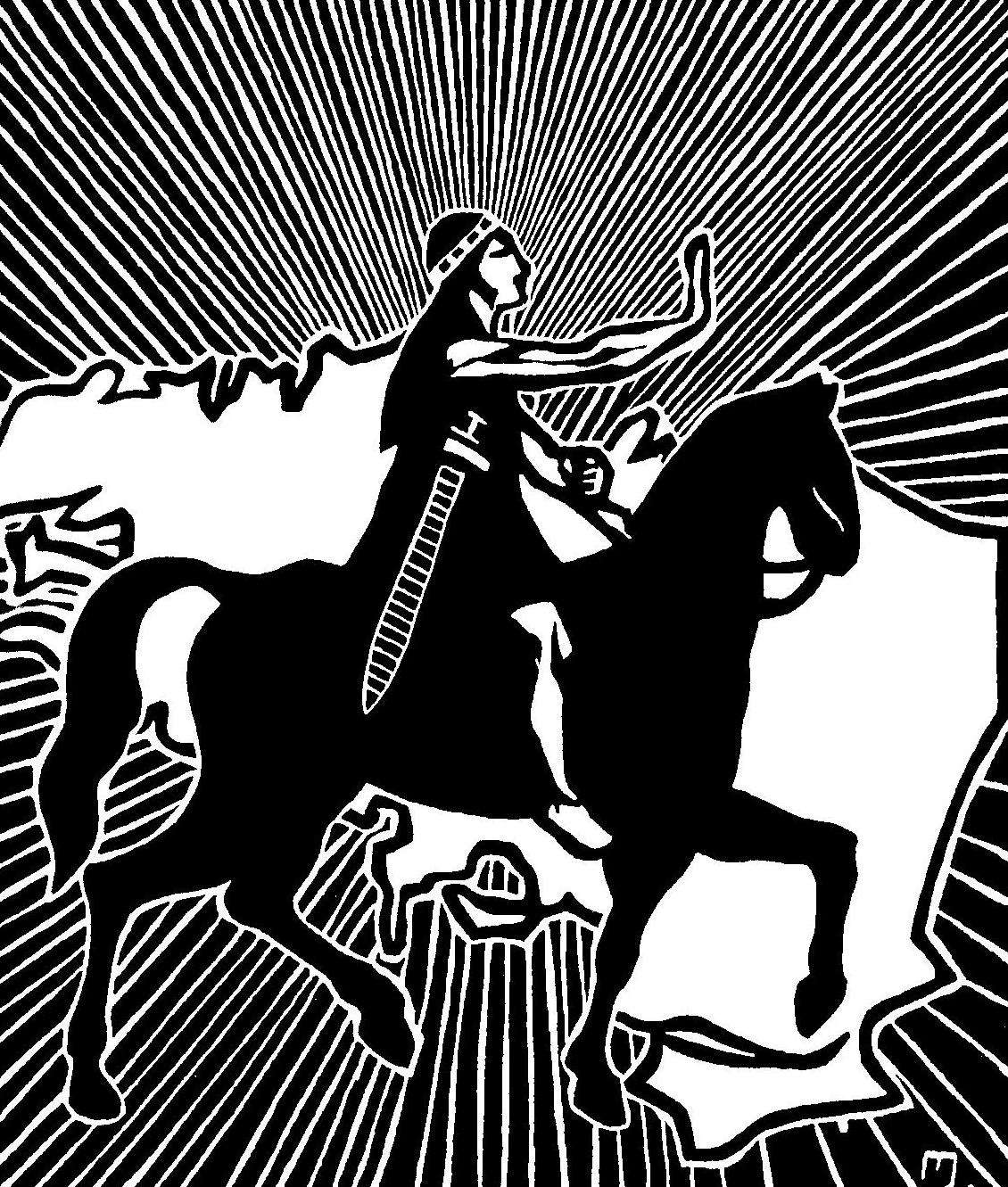
A 1922 nationalist engraving of Nominoe, first king of Brittany

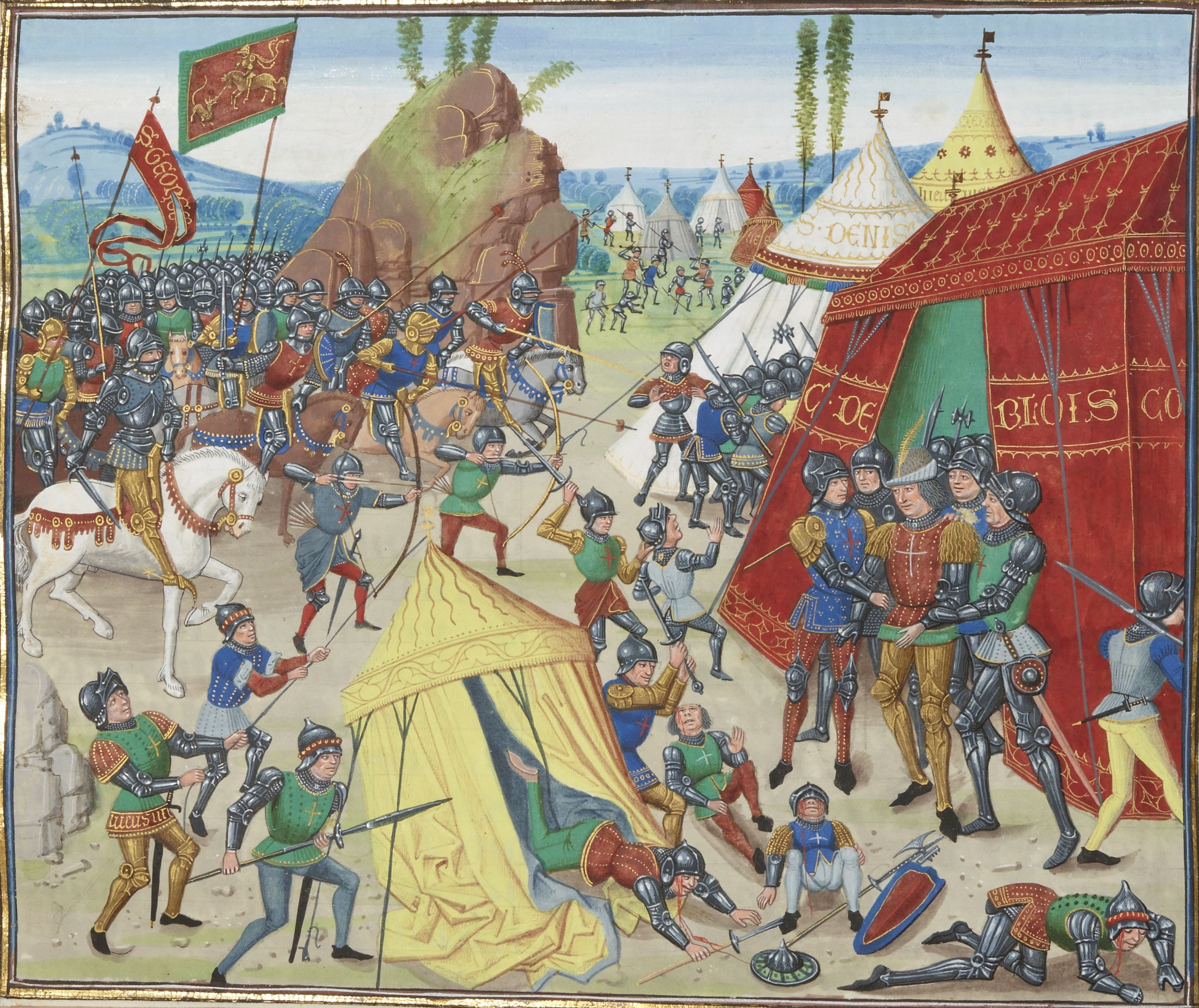
Battle of Ar Roc'h-Derrien during the War of the Breton Succession

At the beginning of the medieval era, Brittany was divided among three kingdoms: Domnonea, Cornouaille and Broërec. These realms eventually merged into a single state during the 9th century. The unification of Brittany was carried out by Nominoe, king between 845 and 851 and considered as the Breton Pater Patriae. Among the immigrant Britons, there were some clergymen who helped the evangelisation of the region, which was still pagan, particularly in rural areas.

His son Erispoe secured the independence of the new kingdom of Brittany and won the Battle of Jengland against Charles the Bald. The Bretons won another war in 867, and the kingdom reached then its maximum extent: It received parts of Normandy, Maine and Anjou and the Channel Islands.

==== Viking occupation ====
Brittany was heavily attacked by the Vikings at the beginning of the 10th century. The kingdom lost its eastern territories, including Normandy and Anjou, and the county of Nantes was given to Fulk I of Anjou in 909. Nantes was seized by the Vikings in 914. At this time Brittany was also called Lydwiccum.

==== Duchy of Brittany ====
Nantes was eventually liberated by Alan II of Brittany in 937 with the support of his godbrother King Æthelstan of England.

Alan II totally expelled the Vikings from Brittany and recreated a strong Breton state. For aiding in removing the problem, Alan paid homage to Louis IV of France (who was Æthelstan's nephew and had returned from England in the same year as Alan II) and thus Brittany ceased to be a kingdom and became a duchy.

==== Norman allies ====
Several Breton lords helped William the Conqueror to invade England and the Bretons formed over a third of the landing force in 1066. They received large estates there (e.g. William's double-second cousin Alan Rufus and the latter's brother Brian of Brittany). The Bretons helped to liberate the Cornish, replacing Anglo-Saxon land owners. Some of these lords were powerful rivals.

==== Internal disputes ====
Medieval Brittany was far from being a united nation. The French king maintained envoys in Brittany, alliances contracted by local lords often overlapped and there was no specific Breton unity. For example, Brittany replaced Latin with French as its official language in the 13th century, 300 years before France did so, and the Breton language did not have formal status.

The foreign policy of the Duchy changed many times; the Dukes were usually independent, but they often contracted alliances with England or France depending on who was threatening them at that point. Their support for each nation became very important during the 14th century because the English kings had started to claim the French throne.

The Breton War of Succession, a local episode of the Hundred Years' War, saw the House of Blois, backed by the French, fighting with the House of Montfort, backed by the English. The Montforts won in 1364 and enjoyed a period of total independence until the end of the Hundred Years' War, because France was weakened and stopped sending royal envoys to the Court of Brittany.

English diplomatic failures led to the Breton cavalry commanders Arthur, Comte de Richemont (later to become Arthur III, Duke of Brittany) and his nephew Peter II, Duke of Brittany playing key roles on the French side during the deciding stages of the war (including the battles of Patay, Formigny and Castillon and the Treaty of Arras).

Brittany importantly lost the Mad War against France in 1488, mostly because of its internal divisions that were exacerbated by the corruption at the court of Francis II, Duke of Brittany. Indeed, some rebel Breton lords were fighting on the French side.

=== Union with the French Crown and modern period ===
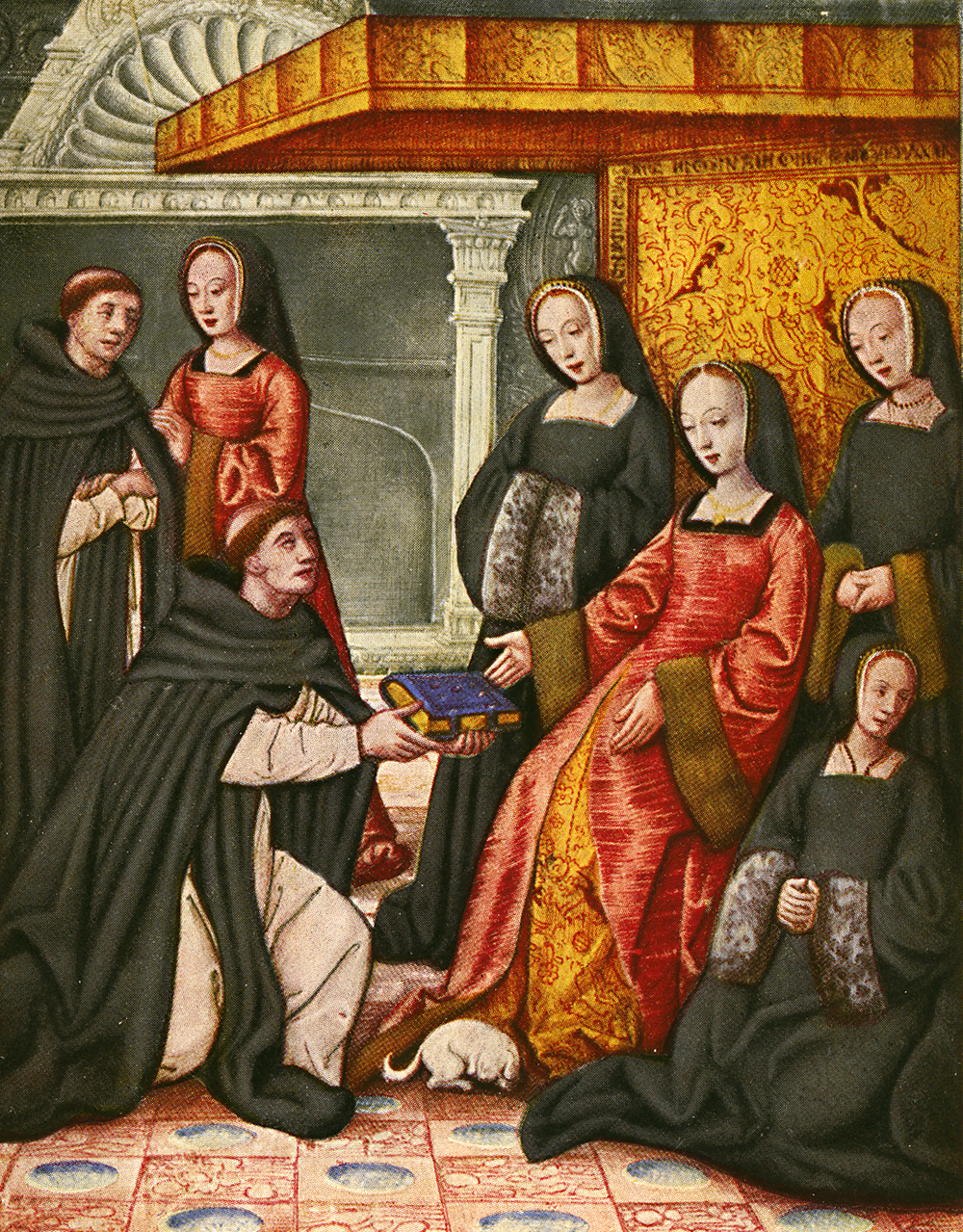
Anne of Brittany is regarded in Brittany as a conscientious ruler who defended the duchy against France.

As a result of the Mad War, the Duke Francis II could not have his daughter Anne married without the king of France's consent. Nonetheless, she married the Holy Roman Emperor in 1490, leading to a crisis with France. Charles VIII of France besieged Rennes and had the marriage cancelled. He eventually married Anne. After he died childless, Anne had to marry his heir and cousin Louis XII. Anne unsuccessfully tried to preserve Breton independence, but she died in 1514, and the union between the two crowns was formally carried out by Francis I in 1532. He granted several privileges to Brittany, such as exemption from the gabelle, a tax on salt that was very unpopular in France. Under the Ancien Régime, Brittany and France were governed as separate countries but under the same crown, so Breton aristocrats in the French royal court were classed as Princes étrangers (foreign princes).

From the 15th to the 18th century, Brittany reached an economic golden age. (Note: Brittany was proverbially wealthy throughout much of its history: it prospered from trade before and during Roman rule, mid-ninth century legal documents reveal peasant landowners suing lords for trespass. The House of Penthièvre was wealthy, Breton dowries raised impoverished nobles such as Jean II de Brosse to riches, and Duchess Anne's fortune contributed to the French Renaissance, to palaces such as Fontainebleau and to the Châteaux of the Loire Valley) The region was located on the seaways near Spain, England and the Dutch Republic and it greatly benefited from the creation of the French colonial empire. Local seaports like Brest and Saint-Brieuc quickly expanded, and Lorient, first spelt "L'Orient", was founded in the 17th century. Saint-Malo was then known for its corsairs, Brest was a major base for the French Navy and Nantes flourished with the Atlantic slave trade. On its side, the inland provided hemp ropes and canvas and linen sheets. However, Colbertism, which encouraged the creation of many factories, did not favour the Breton industry because most of the royal factories were opened in other provinces. Moreover, several conflicts between France and Britain during the 18th century resulted in British blockades which weakened the Breton economy, leading it to go into recession.

==== The centralisation problem ====
Two significant revolts occurred in the 17th and 18th centuries: the Revolt of the papier timbré (1675) and the Pontcallec conspiracy (1719). Both arose from attempts to resist centralisation and assert Breton constitutional exceptions to tax.

==== Breton exodus ====
Many Bretons crossed the Atlantic to support the American War of Independence. These included naval officers such as Armand de Kersaint and soldiers such as Charles Armand Tuffin, marquis de la Rouërie.

=== The French Revolution of 1789 – Division of Brittany into five departments ===
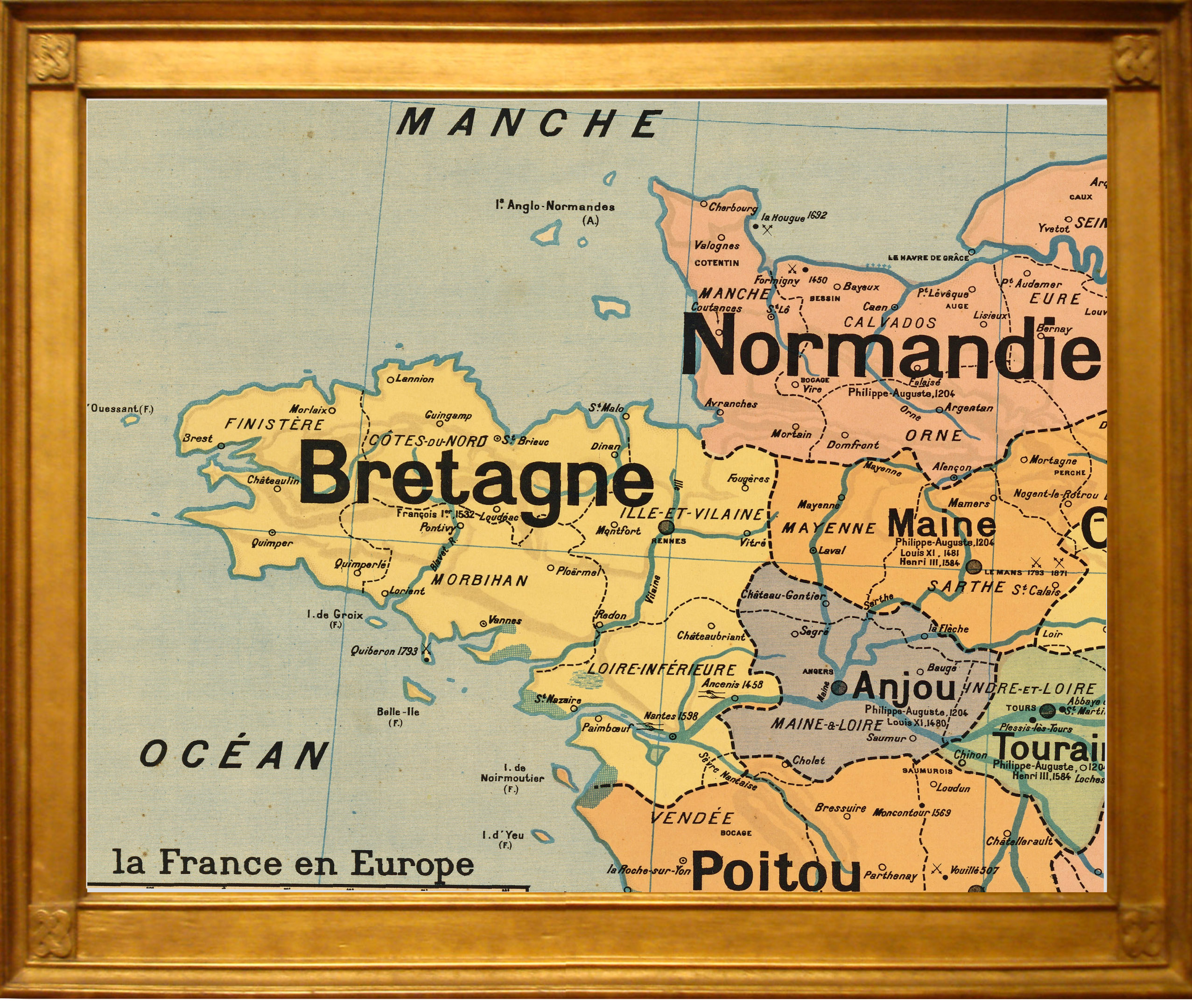
Province of Brittany (1789) – showing internal borders of five new departments: Côtes-du-Nord (now Côtes-d'Armor), Finistère, Ille-et-Vilaine, Loire-Inférieure (now Loire-Atlantique) and Morbihan.

The Duchy was legally abolished with the French Revolution that began in 1789 – and in 1790 the province of Brittany was divided into five departments: Côtes-du-Nord (later Côtes-d'Armor), Finistère, Ille-et-Vilaine, Loire-Inférieure (later Loire-Atlantique) and Morbihan. Brittany essentially lost all its special privileges that existed under the Duchy. Three years later, the area became a centre of royalist and Catholic resistance to the Revolution during the Chouannerie.

During the 19th century, Brittany remained in economic recession, and many Bretons emigrated to other French regions, particularly to Paris. This trend remained strong until the beginning of the 20th century. Nonetheless, the region was also modernising, with new roads and railways being built, and some places being industrialised. Nantes specialised in shipbuilding and food processing (sugar, exotic fruits and vegetables, fish, etc.), Fougères in glass and shoe production, and metallurgy was practised in small towns such as Châteaubriant and Lochrist, known for its labour movements.

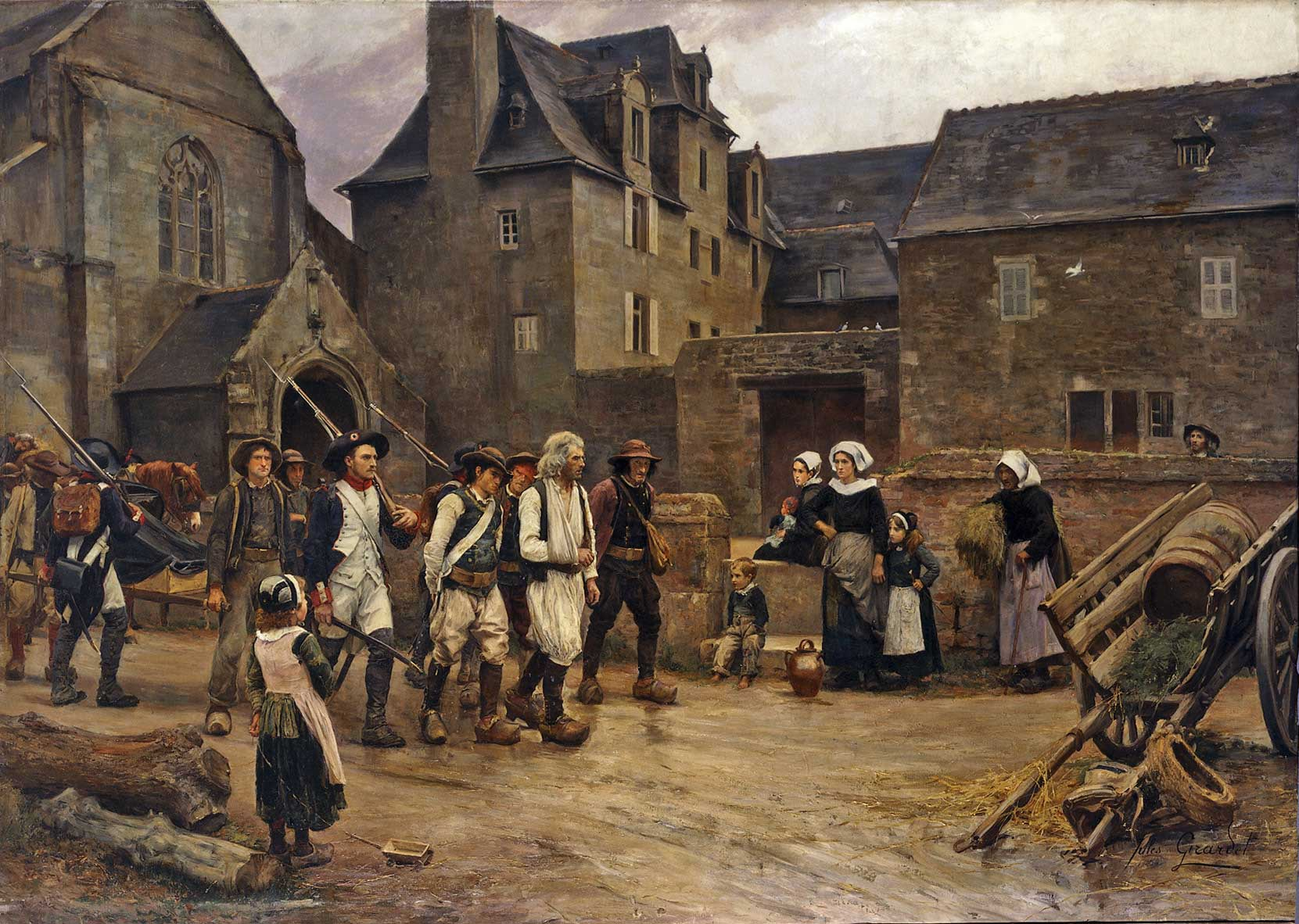
The mutineers of Fouesnant arrested by the National Guard of Quimper in 1792

The region remained deeply Catholic, and during the Second Empire, the conservative values were strongly reasserted. When the Republic was re-established in 1871, there were rumours that Breton troops were mistrusted and mistreated at Camp Conlie during the Franco-Prussian War because of fears that they were a threat to the Republic.

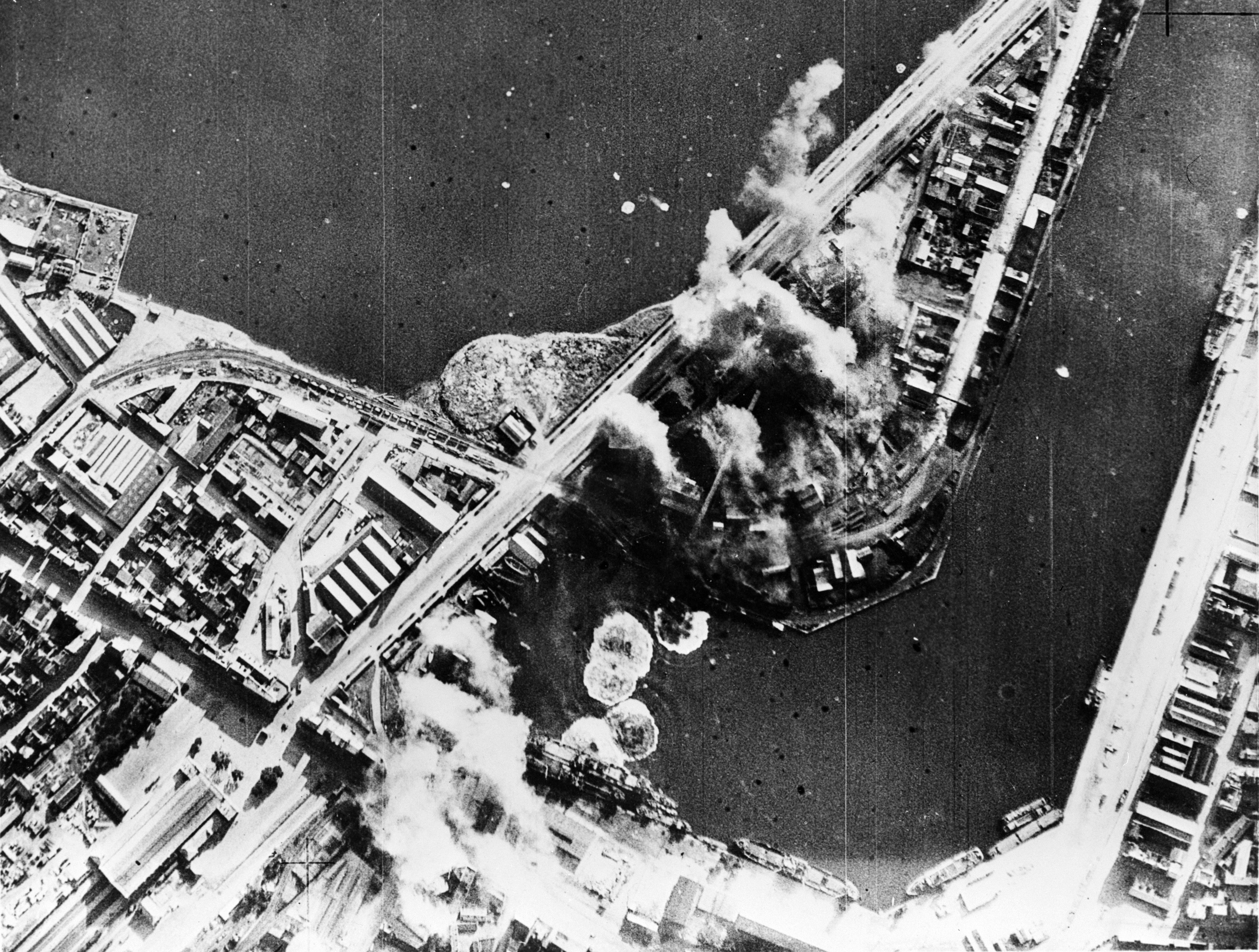
A Royal Air Force attack on Saint-Malo in 1942

During the 19th century, the Breton language started to decline precipitously, mainly because of the Francization policy conducted under the Third Republic. On one hand, children were not allowed to speak Breton at school, and were punished by teachers if they did. Famously, signs in schools read: "It is forbidden to speak Breton and to spit on the floor" ("Il est interdit de parler Breton et de cracher par terre").

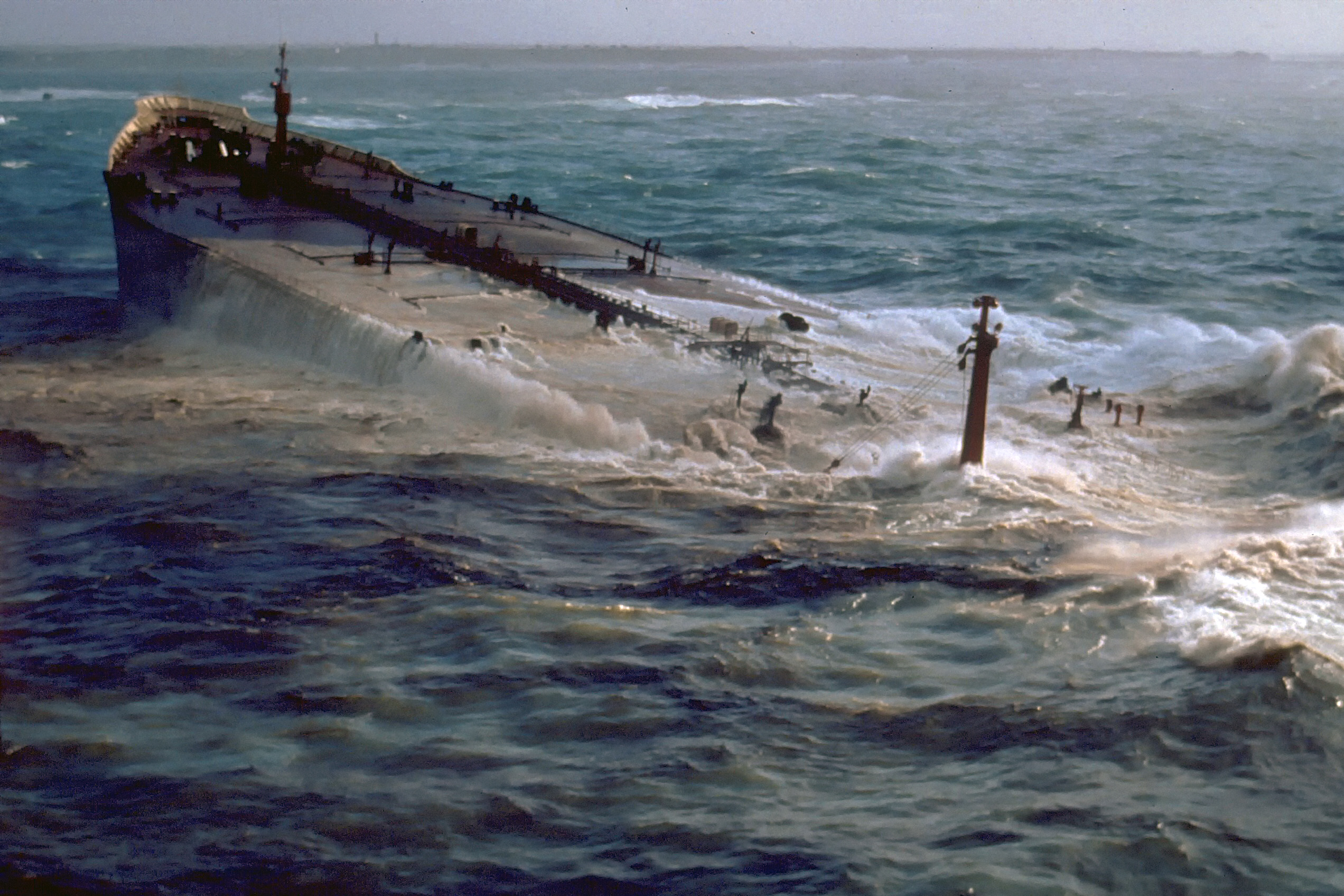
The Amoco Cadiz oil spill in 1978 significantly affected the Breton coast

At the same time, the Celtic Revival led to the foundation of the Breton Regionalist Union (URB) and later to independence movements linked to Irish, Welsh, and Scottish and Cornish independence parties in the UK, and to pan-Celticism. However, the presence of these movements remained very low and their ideas did not reach a large public until the 20th century. The Seiz Breur movement, created in 1923, permitted a Breton artistic revival but its ties with Nazism and the collaborationism of the Breton National Party during World War II weakened Breton nationalism in the post-war period.

Brittany lost 240,000 men during the First World War. The Second World War was also catastrophic for the region. It was invaded by Nazi Germany in 1940 and freed after Operation Cobra in August 1944. However, the areas around Saint-Nazaire and Lorient only surrendered on 10 and 11 May 1945, several days after the German capitulation. The two port towns had been virtually destroyed by Allied air raids, like Brest and Saint-Malo, and other towns, such as Nantes and Rennes, had also suffered.

In 1956, Brittany was legally reconstituted as the Region of Brittany, although the region excluded the ducal capital of Nantes and the surrounding area. Nevertheless, Brittany retained its cultural distinctiveness, and a new cultural revival emerged during the 1960s and 1970s. Bilingual schools were opened, singers started to write songs in Breton, and ecological catastrophes such as the Amoco Cadiz oil spill or the Erika oil spill and water pollution from intensive pig farming favoured new movements to protect the natural heritage.

== Government and politics ==
=== Traditional subdivisions ===
Brittany as a political entity disappeared in 1790, when it was divided into five départements. These replaced the nine Catholic dioceses that appeared at the beginning of the Middle Ages. These were often called "pays" or "bro" ("country" in French and Breton) and they also served as fiscal and military districts. Brittany is also divided between Lower Brittany ("Basse Bretagne" and "Breizh Izel"), corresponding to the western half, where Breton is traditionally spoken, and Upper Brittany ("Haute Bretagne" and "Breizh Uhel"), corresponding to the eastern half, where Gallo is traditionally spoken. The historical Breton dioceses were:

- Upper Brittany:
  - The Pays nantais, around Nantes, corresponding to the Loire-Atlantique département.
  - The Pays rennais, around Rennes, forming part of the Ille-et-Vilaine département.
  - The Pays de Dol, around Dol-de-Bretagne, corresponding to the northern part of the Ille-et-Vilaine département.
  - The Pays de Saint-Brieuc, around Saint-Brieuc, forming part of the Côtes-d'Armor département.
  - The Pays de Saint-Malo, around Saint-Malo, divided between Ille-et-Vilaine, Côtes-d'Armor and Morbihan.
- Lower Brittany:
  - The Pays vannetais, around Vannes, corresponding to the Morbihan département.
  - The Cornouaille, around Quimper, divided between Finistère and Côtes-d'Armor.
  - The Léon, around Saint-Pol-de-Léon, corresponding to the northern part of the Finistère département.
  - The Trégor, around Tréguier, forming part of the Côtes-d'Armor département.

During the French Revolution, four dioceses were suppressed and the five remaining ones were modified to have the same administrative borders as the départements.

=== Capital cities ===
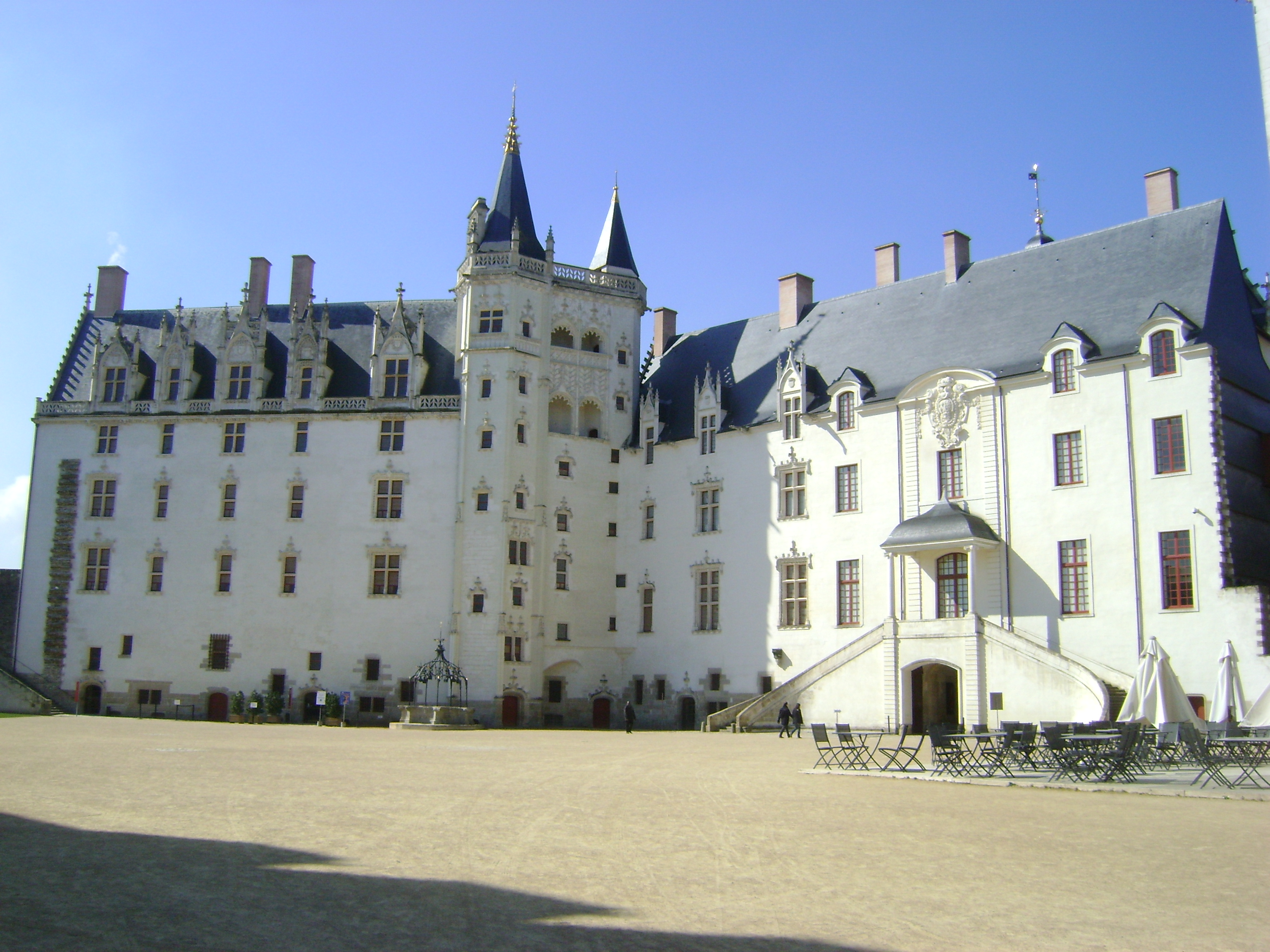
The Château des ducs de Bretagne in Nantes, permanent residence of the last dukes

Brittany has several historical capital cities. When it was an independent duchy, the Estates of Brittany, which can be compared to a parliament, met in various towns: Dinan, Ploërmel, Redon, Rennes, Vitré, Guérande, and, most of all, Vannes, where they met 19 times, and Nantes, 17 times. The Court and the government were also very mobile, and each dynasty favoured its own castles and estates. The dukes mostly lived in Nantes, Vannes, Redon, Rennes, Fougères, Dol-de-Bretagne, Dinan and Guérande. All these towns except Vannes and Guérande are located in Upper Brittany, thus not in the Breton speaking area.

Among all these towns, only Nantes, Rennes and Vannes, which were the biggest ones, could really pretend to the capital status. The dukes were crowned in Rennes and they had a large castle there; it was however destroyed during the 15th century. Vannes, on its side, was the seat of the Chamber of Accounts and of the Parliament until the union with France. The Parliament was then transferred to Rennes, and the Chamber of Accounts to Nantes. Nantes, nicknamed "the city of the Dukes of Brittany", was also the permanent residence of the last dukes. The Château des ducs de Bretagne still stands in the city centre. Nowadays, Rennes is the only official capital of the region of Brittany. It is also the seat of an ecclesiastical province encompassing Brittany and the Pays de la Loire region.

=== Present subdivisions ===
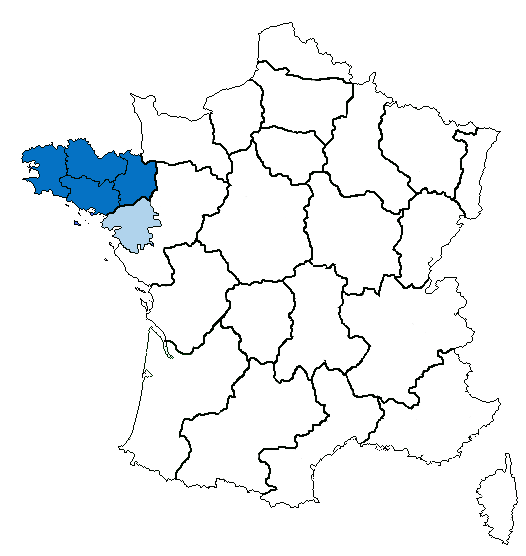
The Brittany region comprises four historic Breton départements. Loire-Atlantique, in light blue, is part of the Pays de la Loire region.

During the French Revolution, Brittany was divided into five départements, each made up of three or four arrondissements. The arrondissements are further divided in cantons, which are themselves made up of one or several communes. The communes and the départements have a local council elected by their citizens, but arrondissements and cantons are not run by elected officials. The cantons serve as an electoral district for the election of the département councils and arrondissements are run by a subprefect appointed by the French president. The president also appoints a prefect in each département.

Because the départements are small and numerous, the French government tried to create wider regions during the 20th century. For the Breton nationalists, it was an occasion to recreate Brittany as a political and administrative entity, but the new region had to be economically efficient. Nantes and its département, Loire-Atlantique, raised concerns because they were off-centered, more integrated with the Loire Valley than with the Breton peninsula. The French government and local politicians also feared that Nantes, because of its population and its former Breton capital status, would have maintained a harmful competition with Rennes to get the regional institutions and investments.

Several drafts for French regions had been proposed since the 1920s, and the definitive regions were drawn in 1956. The new Brittany had four départements, and Loire-Atlantique formed the Pays de la Loire region together with parts of Anjou, Maine and Poitou. In 1972, the regions received their present competencies, with an elected regional council. Since then, the region of Brittany has had its own council and administrative bodies.

=== Reunification ===
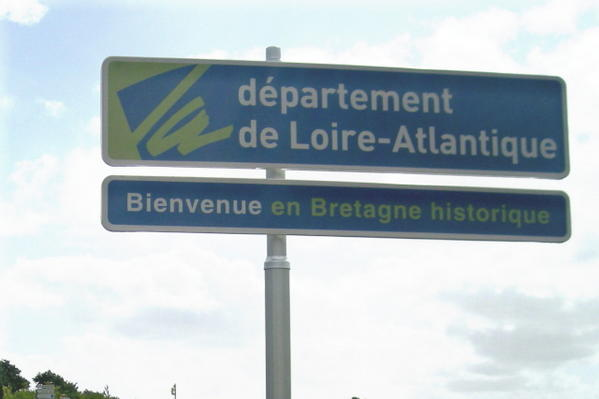
This Loire-Atlantique road sign reads "welcome to historical Brittany".

When the region of Brittany was created, several local politicians opposed the exclusion of Loire-Atlantique, and the question still remains.

The obstacles to reunification are the same as in 1956: having Nantes in Brittany could harm the position of Rennes and create an economic imbalance between Lower and Upper Brittany. Moreover, the Pays de la Loire region could not exist without Loire-Atlantique, because it would lose its political and economic capital. Without Loire-Atlantique, the other départements would not form an efficient region any more, and would have to integrate neighbouring regions such as the Centre-Val de Loire and Nouvelle-Aquitaine.

However, several institutions have backed the reunification, such as the regional council of Brittany since 2008 and the Loire-Atlantique council since 2001. Some politicians like Jean-Marc Ayrault, the former French prime minister and former mayor of Nantes, favour instead the creation of a "Greater West region", which would encompass Brittany and the Pays de la Loire region. Polls show that 58% of the Bretons and 62% of the inhabitants in Loire-Atlantique favour the reunification.

=== Political tendencies ===
Until the end of the 20th century, Brittany had been characterised by a strong Catholic and conservative influence. However, some areas such as the industrial region around Saint-Nazaire and Lorient and the surroundings of Tréguier are traditional Socialist and Communist strongholds. Left-wing parties, mainly the Socialist party and the Greens, have become more powerful after the 1970s and they have formed a majority in the Regional Council of Brittany since 2004. The Loire-Atlantique and Ille-et-Vilaine councils have also been held by the left since 2004.

The Socialist party has held the Côtes-d'Armor council since 1976, and the Finistère council since 1998. On its side, Morbihan remains a right-wing stronghold. The local parties have a very small presence, except the Union Démocratique Bretonne which has seats at the Regional Council and in other local assemblies. It advocates more autonomy for the region and its positions are very close to the Socialist parties. It also has a strong ecological orientation. The presence of far-right parties is lower in Brittany than in the rest of France.

== Geography and natural history ==
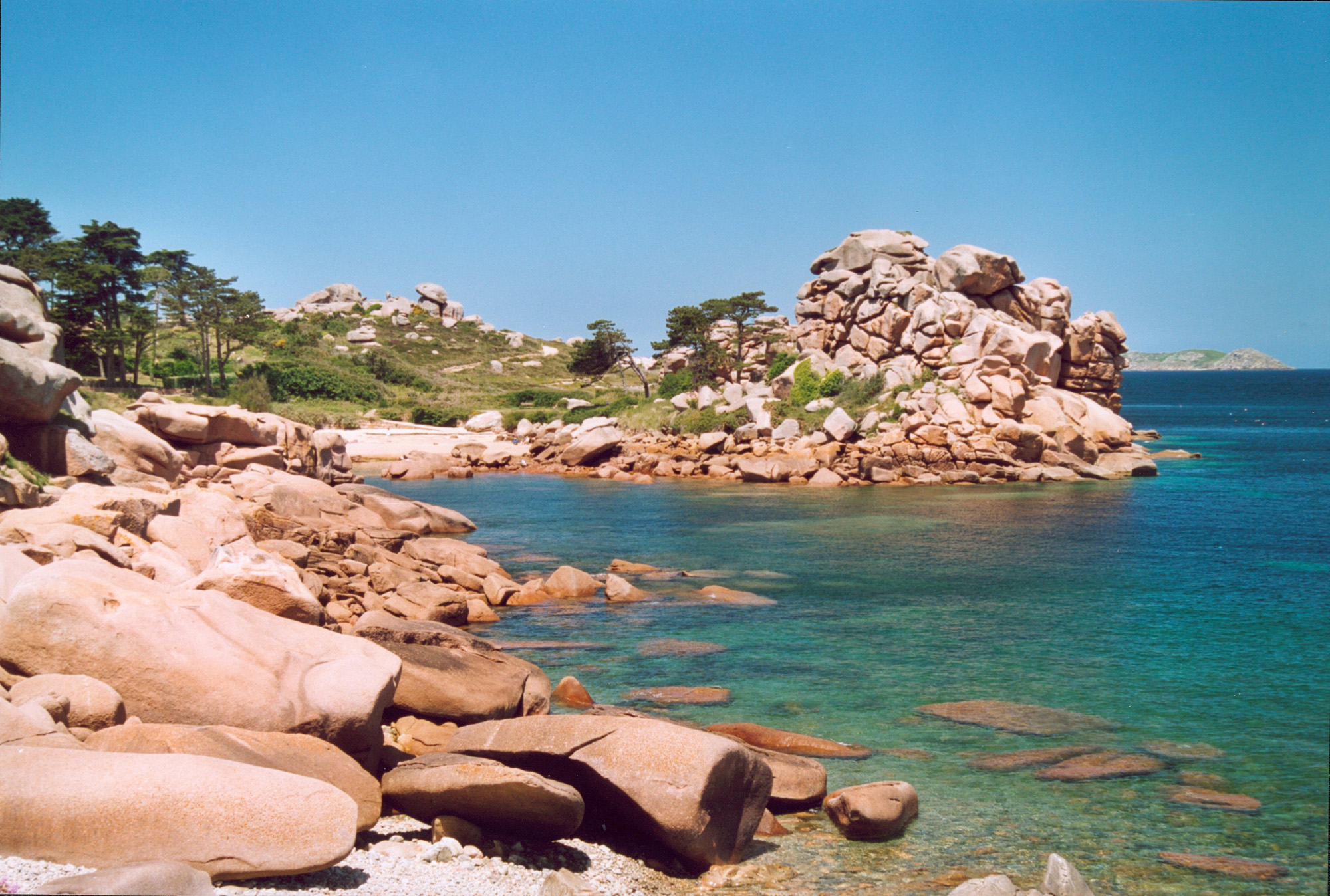
The Pink Granite Coast around Trégastel

Brittany is the largest French peninsula. It is around 34,030 km^{2} (13,140 sq mi) and stretches toward the northwest and the Atlantic Ocean. It is bordered to the north by the English Channel, to the south by the Bay of Biscay and the waters located between the western coast and Ushant Island form the Iroise Sea.

The Breton coast is very indented, with many cliffs, rias and capes. The Gulf of Morbihan is a vast natural harbour with some forty islands that is almost a closed sea. In total, around 800 islands lie off the mainland; the largest being Belle Île, in the south. Brittany has over 2,860 km (1,780 mi) of coastline; it represents a third of the total French coastline.

The region is generally hilly because it corresponds to the western end of the Armorican Massif, a very old range that also extends in Normandy and the Pays de la Loire region. Because of this continuity, the Breton border with the rest of France is not marked by any strong geographical landmark, apart from the river Couesnon, which separates Brittany from Normandy.

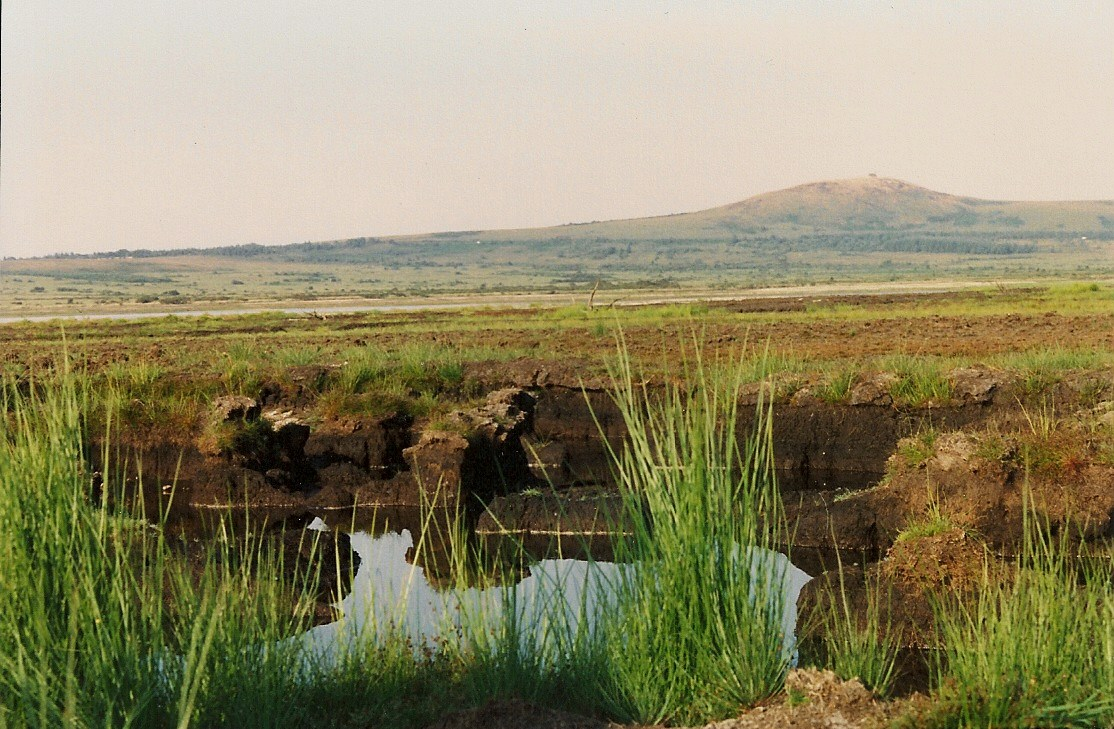
A bog around the Monts d'Arrée

The Armorican Massif reaches its maximum elevation outside of Brittany, in neighbouring Mayenne, at 417 m, and slopes towards the west before straightening on its western extremity, with the Montagnes Noires and the Monts d'Arrée. The highest hill in Brittany is the Roc'h Ruz in the Monts d'Arrée, at 385 m (1,263 ft). It is closely followed by several neighbouring hills culminating at around 384 m above sea level.

Coastal areas are usually named Armor or Arvor ("by the sea" in Breton), and the inland is called Argoat ("by the forest"). The best soils were primitively covered by large forests which had been progressively replaced by bocage during the Middle Ages. The Breton bocage, with its small fields enclosed by thick hedgerows, has almost disappeared since the 1960s to fit the modern agricultural needs and methods, particularly mechanisation.

Several forests still exist, such as the Paimpont forest, sometimes said to be the Arthurian Brocéliande. The poor and rocky areas are covered by large heathland and moorlands, and Brittany has several marshes, like the Brière, included in a regional natural park. Another regional park encompasses the Monts d'Arrée and the Iroise seacoast. The Iroise Sea is also a UNESCO biosphere reserve.

=== Geology ===
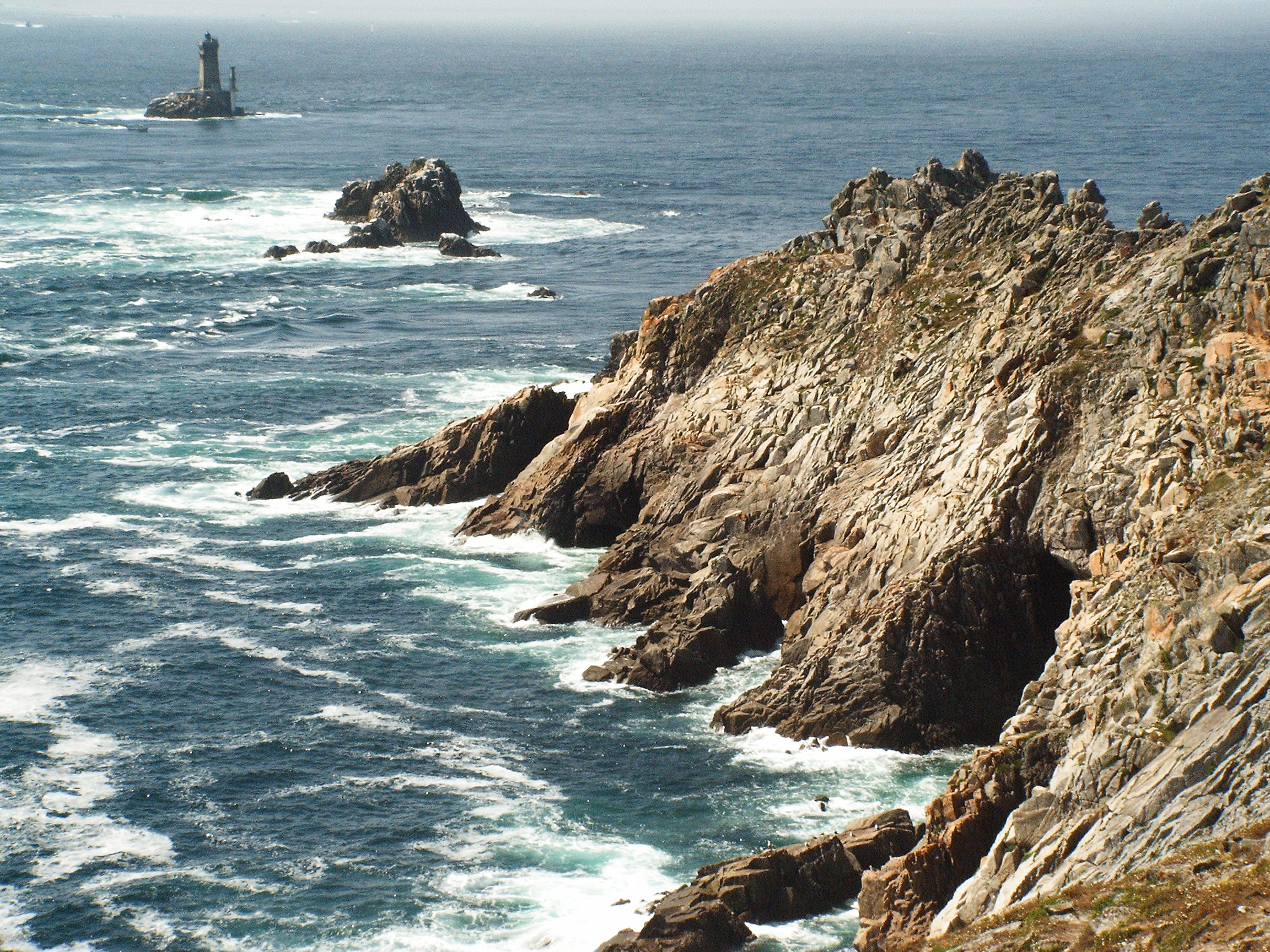
The Pointe du Raz, one of the westernmost extents of both Brittany and Metropolitan France

The Breton peninsula appeared during the Cadomian Orogeny, which formed its northern coastline, between Guingamp and Fougères. The southern part emerged during the Hercynian orogeny. At the same time, intense magmatic activity left large quantities of granite. Between the Cadomian and Hercynian periods, the region was submerged several times and the sea left fossiliferous sedimentary rocks, now mostly schist and sandstone. Because of the absence of limestone, soils in Brittany are usually acidic.

The Armorican massif straightened and flattened several times during the formation of the Pyrenees and the Alps. Changes in sea levels and climate led to a strong erosion and to the formation of more sedimentary rocks. Metamorphism is responsible for the distinctive local blue schist and for the rich subsoil of the Groix island, which comprises glaucophane and epidote.

During the Quaternary glaciations, Brittany was covered by loess and rivers started to fill the valleys with alluvial deposits. The valleys themselves were a result of a strong tectonic activity between the African and the Eurasian Plate. The present Breton landscape did not acquire its final shape before one million years ago. The Breton subsoil is characterised by a huge amount of fractures that form a large aquifer containing several millions square meters of water.

=== Climate ===
Brittany lies within the north temperate zone. It has a changeable, maritime climate, similar to Cornwall. Rainfall occurs regularly but sunny, cloudless days are also common. In the summer months, temperatures in the region can reach 30 °C (86 °F), yet the climate remains comfortable, especially when compared to the French regions located south of the Loire. The temperature difference between summer and winter is about 15 degrees, but it varies depending on the proximity of the sea. The weather is generally milder on the seacoast than inland but rainfall occurs with the same intensity on both. The Monts d'Arrée, despite their low elevation, have much more rainfall than the rest of the region. The south coast, between Lorient and Pornic, enjoys more than 2,000 hours of sunshine per year.

=== Flora and fauna ===
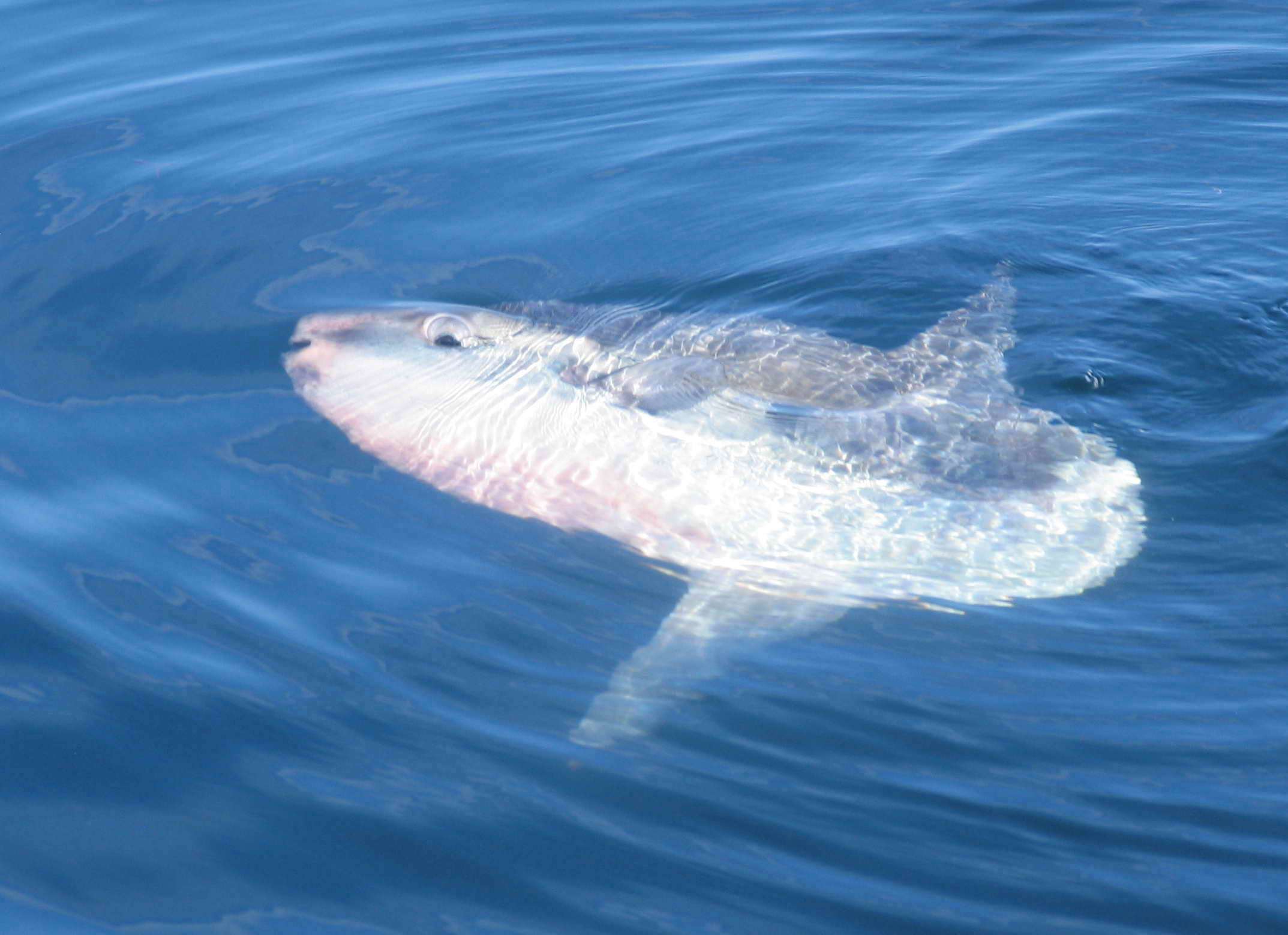
An ocean sunfish exhibiting its characteristic horizontal basking behaviour several miles off Penmarch

Brittany's wildlife is typical of France with several distinctions. On one hand, the region, due to its long coastline, has a rich oceanic fauna, and some birds cannot be seen in other French regions. On the other hand, the species found in the inland are usually common for France, and because Brittany is a peninsula, the number of species is lower in its western extremity than in the eastern part.

A variety of seabirds can be seen close to the seaside, which is home to colonies of cormorants, gulls, razorbills, northern gannets, common murres and Atlantic puffins. Most of these birds breed on isolated islands and rocks and thus are hard to observe. The inland is home to common European species including pheasants, barn swallows, woodcocks, common swifts, and partridges.

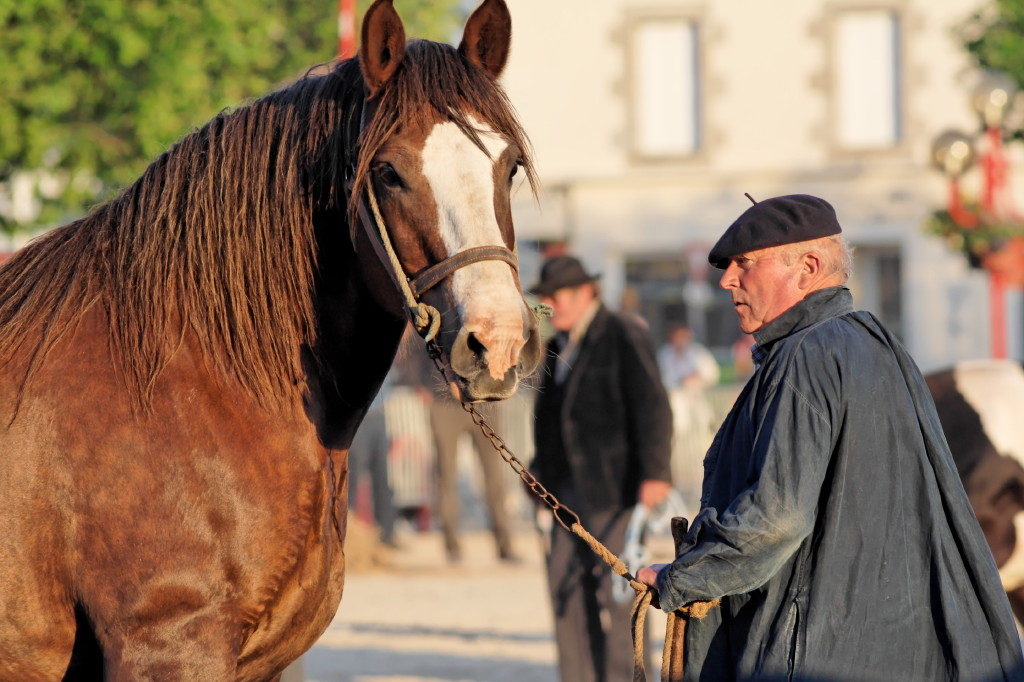
A Breton horse

Like Cornwall, Wales and Ireland, the waters of Brittany attract marine animals including basking sharks, grey seals, leatherback turtles, dolphins, porpoises, jellyfish, crabs and lobsters. Bass is common along the coast, small-spotted catsharks live on the continental shelf, rattails and anglerfish populate the deep waters. River fish of note include trout, Atlantic salmon, pikes, shades and lampreys. The Breton rivers are also home to beavers and otters and to some invasive American species, such as the coypu which destroys the ecosystem and accelerated the extinction of the European mink.

Among the invertebrates, Brittany is notably home to the escargot de Quimper, the freshwater pearl mussel and the white-clawed crayfish. The larger Breton mammals died out during the modern period, including the wolf. Today, mammals of note include roe deer, wild boar, foxes, hares and several species of bat.

Brittany is widely known for the Breton horse, a local breed of draft horse, and for the Brittany gun dog. The region also has its own breeds of cattle, some of which are on the brink of extinction: the Bretonne Pie Noir, the Froment du Léon, the Armorican and the Nantaise.

The Breton forests, dunes, moorlands and marshes are home to several iconic plants, such as endemic cistus, aster and linaria varieties, the horseshoe vetch and the lotus maritimus.

== Education ==
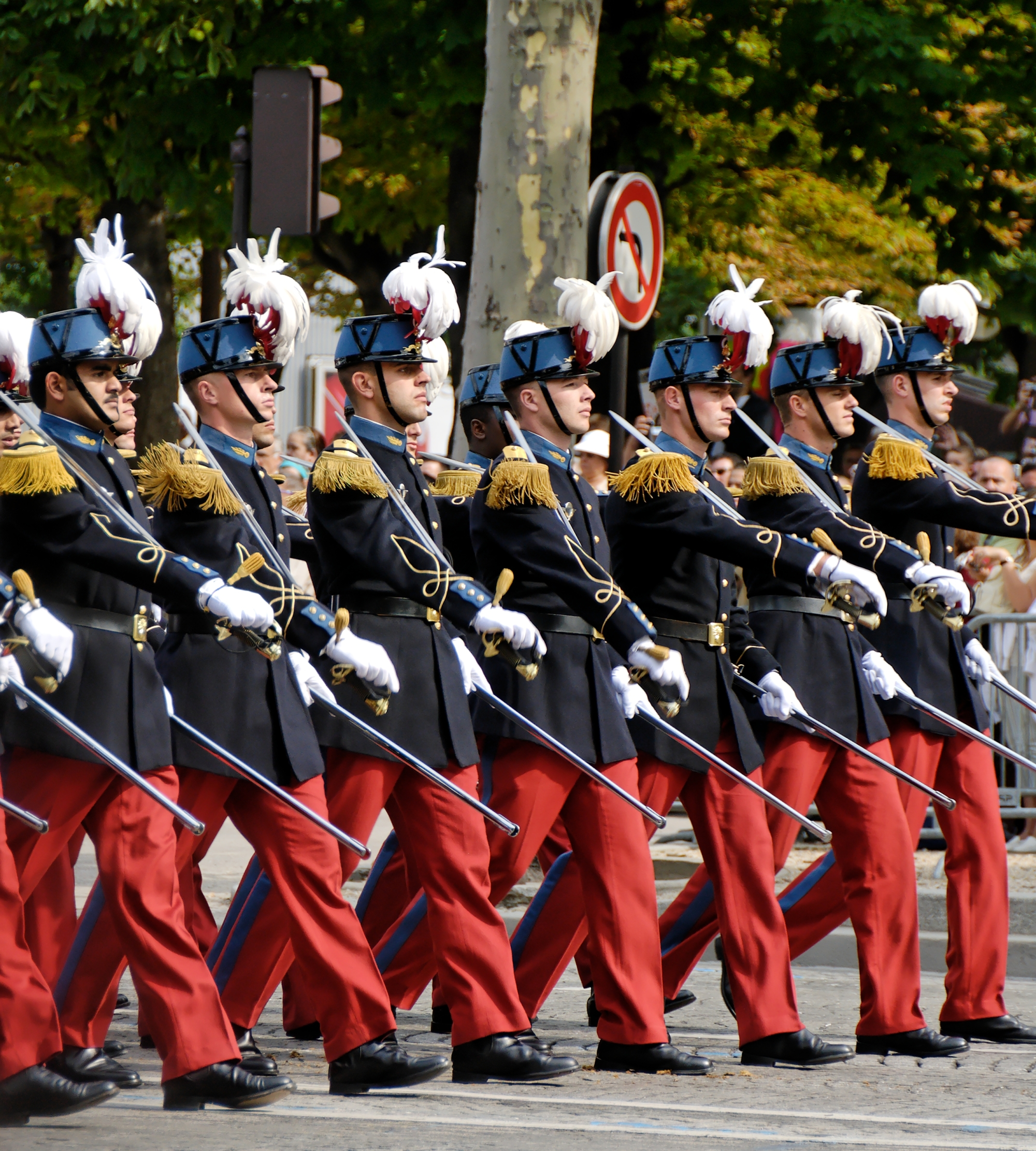
A battalion of the Saint-Cyr-Coëtquidan military academy

Brittany has the same education system as the rest of France. As in other French regions, formal education before the 19th century was the preserve of the elite. Before 1460, Brittany did not have a university, and Breton students had to go to Angers, Poitiers or Caen. The University of Nantes was founded under the duke Francis II, who wanted to affirm the Breton independence from France. All the traditional disciplines were taught here: arts, theology, law and medicine. During the 17th century, it had around 1,500 students. It declined during the 18th century, mostly because Nantes was flourishing with the Atlantic slave trade and paid no attention to its cultural institutions.

A mayor eventually asked the university to be relocated to Rennes, more devoted to culture and science, and the faculties progressively moved there after 1735. The transfer was interrupted by the French Revolution, and all the French universities were dissolved in 1793.

Napoleon reorganised the French education system in 1808. He created new universities and invented two secondary education institutions: the collèges and the lycées which were opened in numerous towns to educate boys and form a new elite. A new University of Rennes was progressively recreated during the 19th century.

In the meantime, several laws were promoted to open schools, notably for girls. In 1882, Jules Ferry succeeded in passing a law which made primary education in France free, non-clerical (laïque) and mandatory. Thus, free schools were opened in almost every village of Brittany.

=== Language of humiliation ===
Jules Ferry also promoted education policies establishing French language as the language of the Republic, and mandatory education was a mean to eradicate regional languages and dialects. In Brittany, it was forbidden for the pupils to speak Breton or Gallo, and the two were strongly depreciated. Humiliating practices aimed at stamping out the Breton language and culture prevailed in state schools until the late 1960s.

In response, the Diwan schools were founded in 1977 to teach Breton by immersion. They have taught a few thousand young people from elementary school to high school, and they have gained more fame owing to their high level of results in school exams.

A bilingual approach has also been implemented in some state schools after 1979, and some Catholic schools have done the same after 1990. Besides, Brittany, with the neighbouring Pays de la Loire region, remains a stronghold for Catholic private education with around 1,400 schools.

=== Other Institutes of Learning ===
During the 20th century, tertiary education was developed with the creation of the École centrale de Nantes in 1919, the University of Nantes in 1961, the ESC Bretagne Brest in 1962, the University of Western Brittany in 1971, the École Nationale Supérieure des Télécommunications de Bretagne in 1977 and the University of Southern Brittany in 1995. The Catholic University of the West, based in Angers, also opened classes in several Breton towns. In 1969, the University of Rennes was divided between the University of Rennes 1 and the University of Rennes 2 – Upper Brittany. After the Second World War, the Ecole Spéciale Militaire de Saint-Cyr, the foremost French military academy, settled in Coëtquidan.

== Economy ==
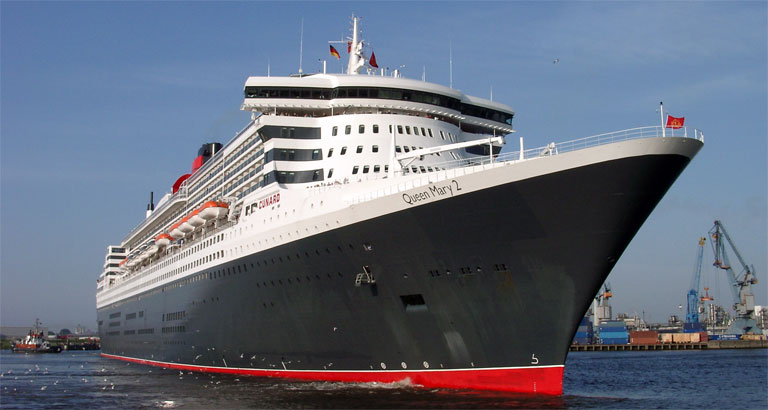
RMS Queen Mary 2, once the world's largest passenger ship, was built in Saint-Nazaire.

Brittany, apart from some areas such as Lorient, Nantes and Saint-Nazaire, has never been heavily industrialised. Today, fishing and agriculture remain important activities. Brittany has more than 40,000 farms, mostly oriented towards cattle, pig and poultry breeding, as well as cereal and vegetable production. The number of farms tends to diminish, but as a result, they are merged into very large estates. Brittany is the first producer in France for vegetables (green beans, onions, artichokes, potatoes, tomatoes, etc.). Cereals are mostly grown for cattle feeding. Wine, especially muscadet, is made in a small region south of Nantes. Brittany is the first region in France for fishing. The activity employs around 15,000 people, and more than 2500 firms work in fish and seafood processing.

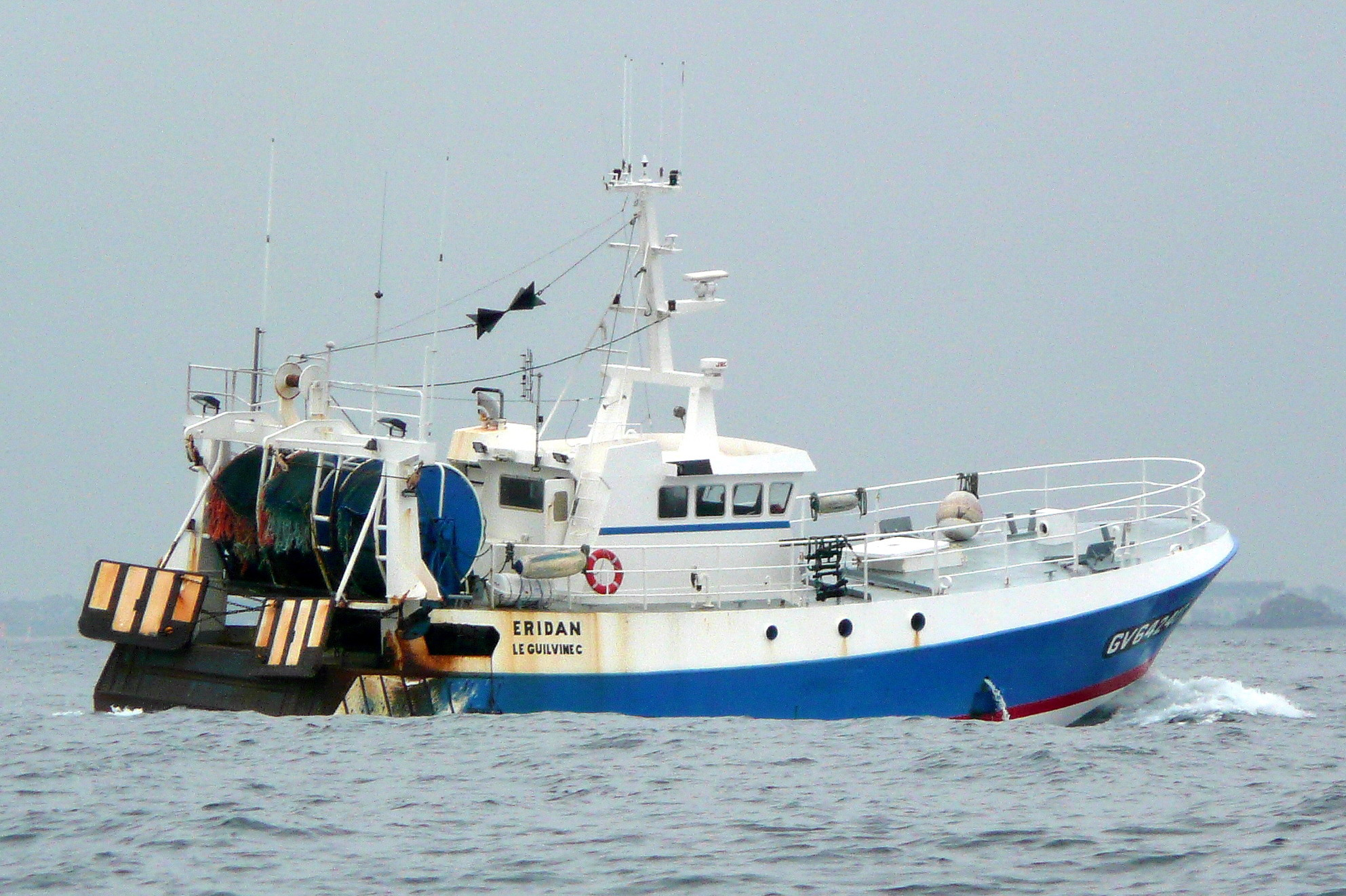
A fishing trawler from Le Guilvinec

Although relatively new, the Breton industry has been constantly growing since 1980. Food processing (meat, vegetables, etc.) represents a third of the industrial jobs, but other activities are also important for the local economy. Shipbuilding, both commercial and military, is implanted in Saint-Nazaire (Chantiers de l'Atlantique), Lorient and Brest; Airbus has plants in Saint-Nazaire and Nantes; and Peugeot has a large factory in Rennes. Brittany is the second French region for telecommunication and the fifth for electronics, two activities mainly developed in Rennes, Lannion and Brest.

The unemployment rate in Brittany is lower than in other French regions and it is usually around 6 or 7% of the active population. Due to the 2008 financial crisis, unemployment rose to 8.7% in the Region Brittany and 8.4% in Loire-Atlantique in late 2012. However, these figures remain under the French national rate (9.9% at the same period). Some industries, such as construction, industry, catering or transport, usually have difficulties finding employees.

In 2018, Region Brittany's gross domestic product reached 99 billion euros. It was the ninth richest region in France and it produced 4% of the national GDP. The Breton GDP per capita was around 29,694 euros in 2018. That means it was lower than the French average of 30,266 euros, and below the European Union average of 30,900 euros. The GDP of the Loire-Atlantique département is around 26 billion euros, and the GDP of the five historical Breton départements would be at around 108 billion euros.

=== Tourism ===
Tourism is particularly important for the seacoast and Brittany is one of the most visited regions in France. In April 2019, The Guardian's travel section included two Brittany locations in its list of 20 of the most beautiful villages in France. The two were Rochefort-en-Terre with "its covered market, 12th-century church, medieval castle, 19th-century chateau, and 16th- and 17th-century mansions" and Locronan, where "East India Company's offices still stand on the village square, as well as 17th-century merchants' dwellings".

== Demographics ==
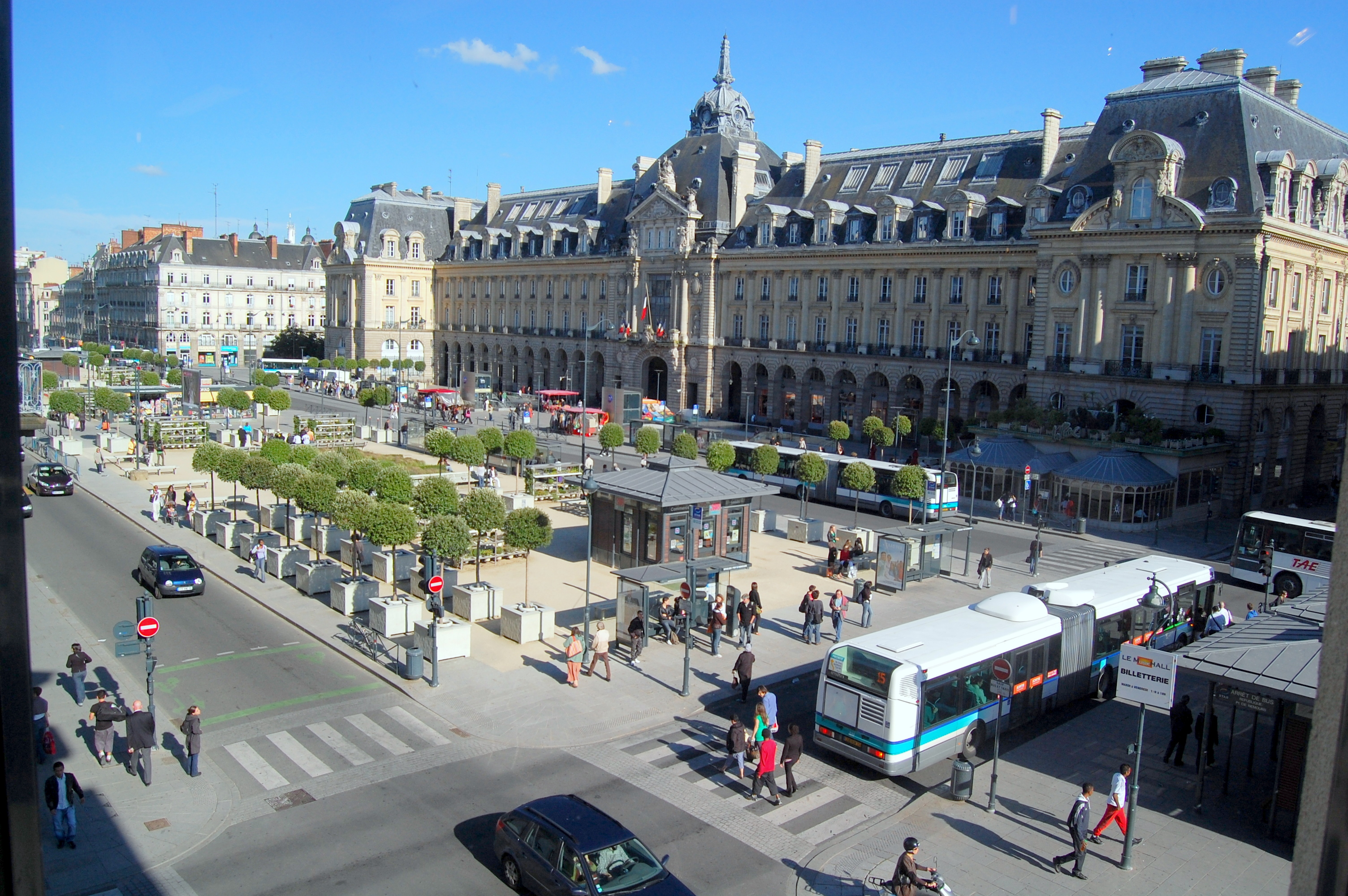
Rennes, the most populated city in Region Brittany and the second in historical Brittany, behind Nantes

In 2017, the population in Region Brittany was estimated to 3,318,904 and Loire-Atlantique had around 1,394,909 inhabitants, thus historical Brittany's population can be estimated at 4,713,813, the highest in its history. The population in Region Brittany had grown by 0.9% between 1999 and 2000, and the growth rate reached more than 1% in Ille-et-Vilaine and Morbihan. The region around Rennes and the south are the more attractive areas, whereas the population is declining in the centre and in the westernmost parts. While most of the metropolitan areas are growing, the cities themselves tend to stagnate or regress, such as for Brest, Lorient, Saint-Brieuc and Saint-Malo. In 2017, Ille-et-Vilaine had 1,060,199 inhabitants, it was followed by Finistère 909,028 inhabitants, Morbihan 750,863 inhabitants, and Côtes-d'Armor, with 598,814 inhabitants.

The largest cities in Region Brittany as of 2017 were Rennes, with 216,815 inhabitants, Brest 140,064, Quimper 62,985, Lorient 57,149, Vannes 53,352, Saint-Malo 46,097 and Saint-Brieuc 44,372. All the other communes had under 25,000 inhabitants. Brittany is also characterised by a great number of small towns, such as Vitré, Concarneau, Morlaix or Auray. Loire-Atlantique has two major cities, Nantes, with 309,346 inhabitants and an urban area encompassing 972,828, and Saint-Nazaire, with 69,993 inhabitants. Loire-Atlantique's population is more rapidly growing than Region Brittany's and it is the 12th most populated French département. Nevertheless, since the 1990s, Rennes has consistently ranked as one of France's fastest growing metropolitan areas.

In 1851, Brittany had around 2.7 million inhabitants and the demographic growth stayed low until the second half of the 20th century, mainly because of an important emigration. Brittany had 3.2 million inhabitants in 1962 and the growth was mainly due to Loire-Atlantique and the steady growth of Nantes. Without the Loire-Atlantique's figures, the Breton population only numbered 2.4 million in 1962, nearly unchanged from its population of 2.3 million in 1851. After the 1960s, the whole region has had a strong demographic growth because of the decline of the traditional emigration to richer French regions. Instead, Brittany has become attractive, particularly for families, young retired persons and active people over 35 years old.

=== Regional identity ===
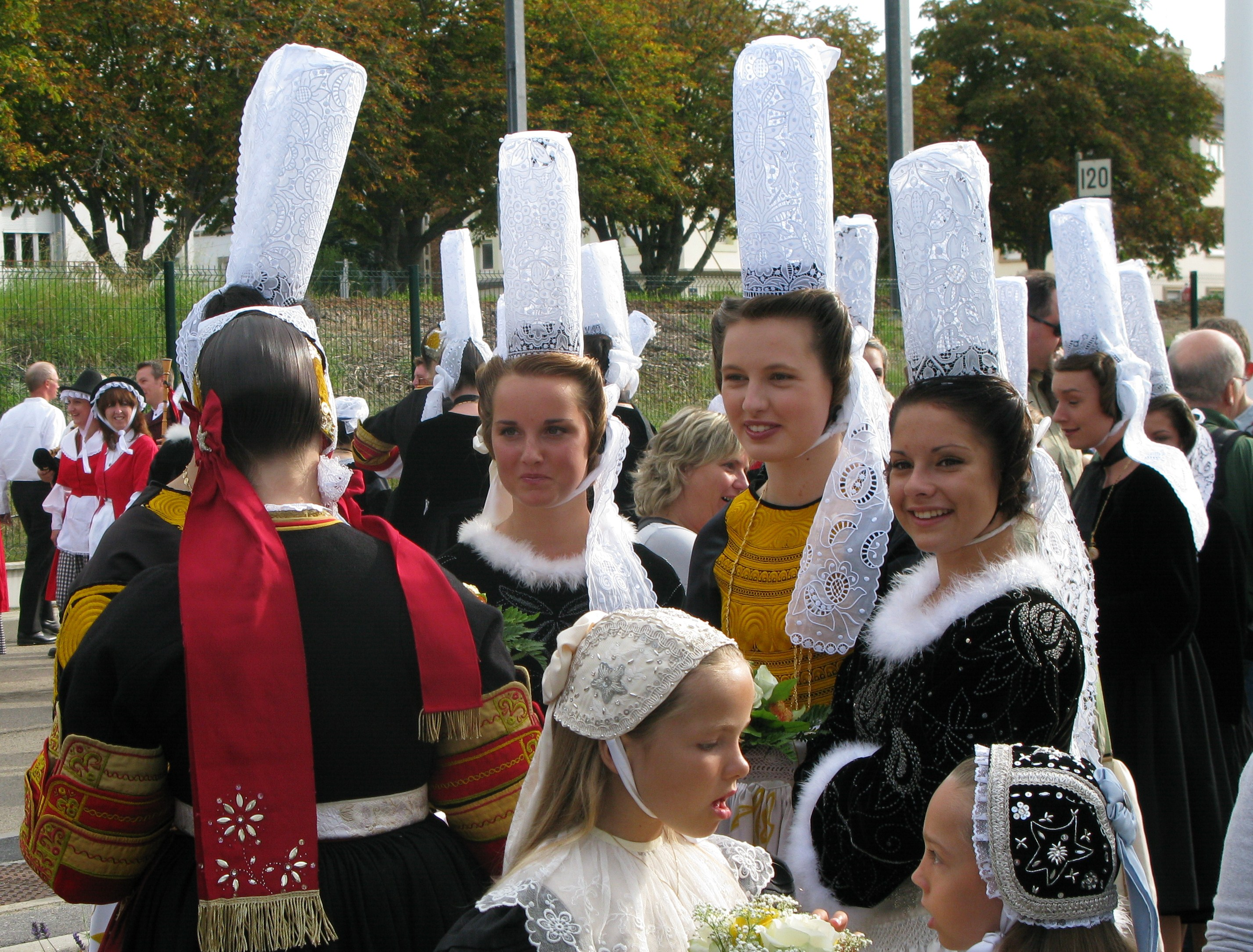
Breton women wearing the distinctive Bigoudène headdress, one of the symbols of Breton identity

Breton political parties do not have wide support and their electoral success is small. However, Bretons have a strong cultural identity. According to a poll made in 2008, 50% of the inhabitants of the region of Brittany considered themselves as much Breton as French, 22.5% felt more Breton than French, and 15.4% more French than Breton. A minority, 1.5%, considered themselves Breton but not French, while 9.3% did not consider themselves to be Breton at all.

51.9% of the poll respondents agreed that Brittany should have more political power, and 31.1% thought that it should stay the same. Only 4.6% favoured independence, and 9.4% were undecided.

A 2012 poll taken in the five departments of historical Brittany showed that 48% of the respondents considered themselves belonging first to France, 37% to Brittany, and 10% to Europe. It also showed that Breton identity is stronger among people younger than 35. 53% of them considering themselves to belong first to Brittany. 50% of the older respondents considered themselves belonging first to France. Primary Breton identity is at its lowest among the respondents over 65: 58% consider themselves to belong first to France, with European identify secondary. 21% of the respondents over 65 considering themselves to be European first. Breton self-identification is stronger among people who vote left-wing. It is stronger among employees than employers.

=== Regional languages ===
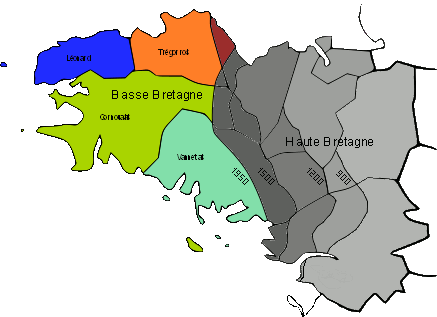
Lower Brittany (in colours), where the Breton language is traditionally spoken and Upper Brittany (in shades of grey), where the Gallo language is traditionally spoken. The changing shades indicate the advance of Gallo and French, and retreat of Breton from 900 AD.

French, the sole official language of the French Republic, is spoken today by the vast majority in Brittany, for whom it is usually their mother tongue. However, French was not widely known in the region before the 19th century, and two regional languages exist in Brittany: Breton and Gallo. They are separated by a language border that has constantly moved back since the Middle Ages.

The current border runs from Plouha on the English Channel to the Rhuys Peninsula on the Bay of Biscay. Because of their origins and practice, Breton and Gallo can be compared to Scottish Gaelic and Scots language in Scotland. Both have been recognised as "Langues de Bretagne" (languages of Brittany) by the Regional Council of Brittany since 2004.

==== Breton ====
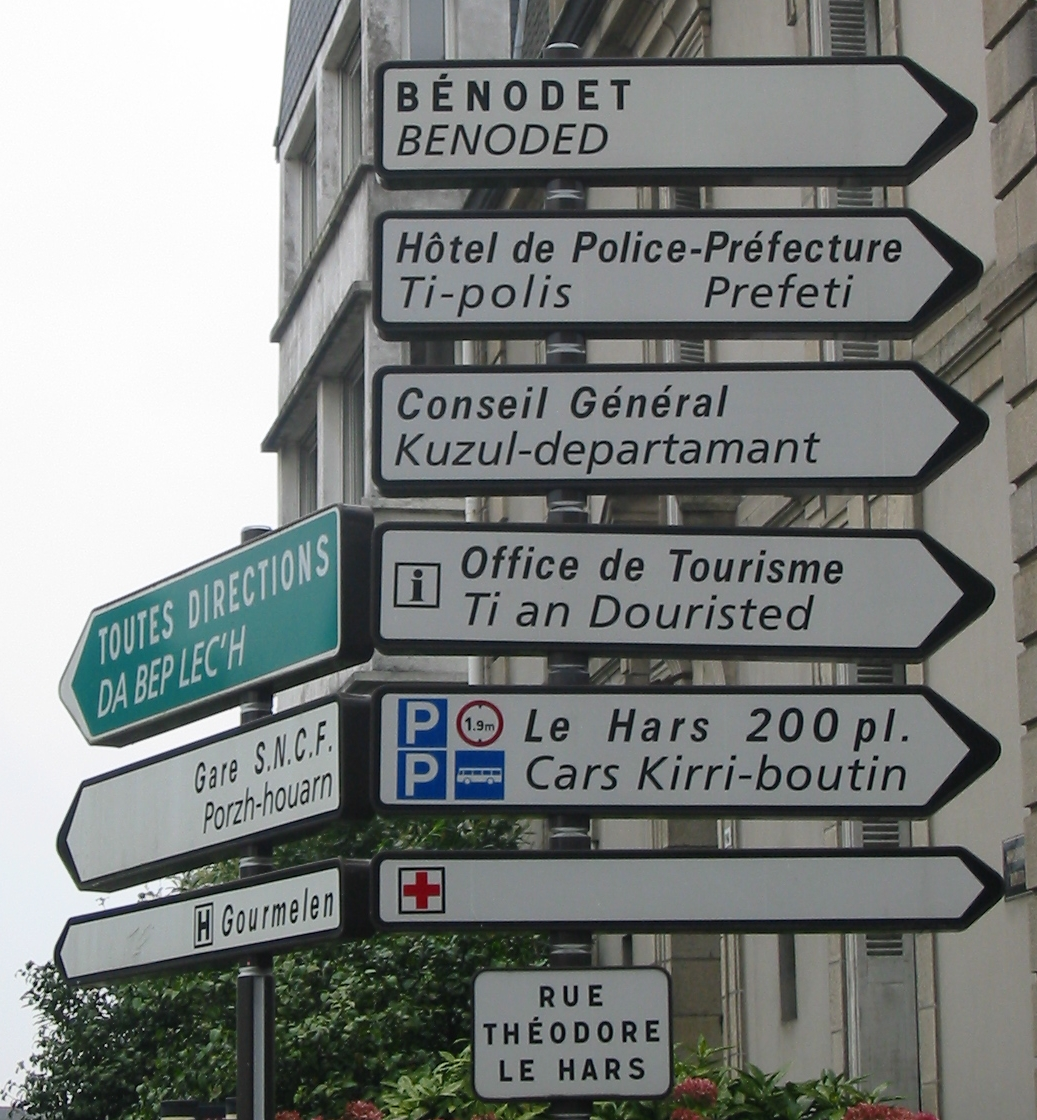
Bilingual road signs can be seen in traditional Breton-speaking areas.

Breton is a Celtic language derived from the historical Common Brittonic language, and is most closely related to Cornish and Welsh. It was imported to Western Armorica during the 5th century by Britons fleeing the Anglo-Saxon invasion of Britain. Breton remained the language of the rural population, but since the Middle Ages the bourgeoisie, the nobility, and the higher clergy have spoken French.

A Breton speaker, recorded in Canada.

Government policies in the 19th and 20th centuries made education compulsory and, at the same time, forbade the use of Breton in schools to push non-French speakers into adopting the French language. Nevertheless, until the 1960s Breton was spoken or understood by many of the inhabitants of western Brittany. During the 1970s, Breton schools were opened and the local authorities started to promote the language, which was on the brink of extinction because parents had stopped teaching it to their children.

Having declined from more than one million speakers around 1950 to about 200,000 in the first decade of the 21st century, of whom 61% are more than 60 years old, Breton is classified as "severely endangered" by the UNESCO Atlas of the World's Languages in Danger. However, the number of children attending bilingual classes has risen 33% between 2006 and 2012 to 14,709.

The Breton language has several dialects which have no precise limits but rather form a continuum. Most of them are very similar to each other, with only some phonetic and lexical differences. The three main dialects spoken in the western end of Brittany are:

- the Cornouillais, around Quimper,
- the Léonard, around Saint-Pol-de-Léon, and
- the Trégorrois, around Tréguier, are grouped into the KLT group (Kerne-Leon-Treger),

in opposition to the Vannetais, spoken around Vannes, which is the most differentiated Breton dialect.

According to a 1999 INSEE survey, 12% of the adults of Brittany speak Breton.

==== Gallo ====
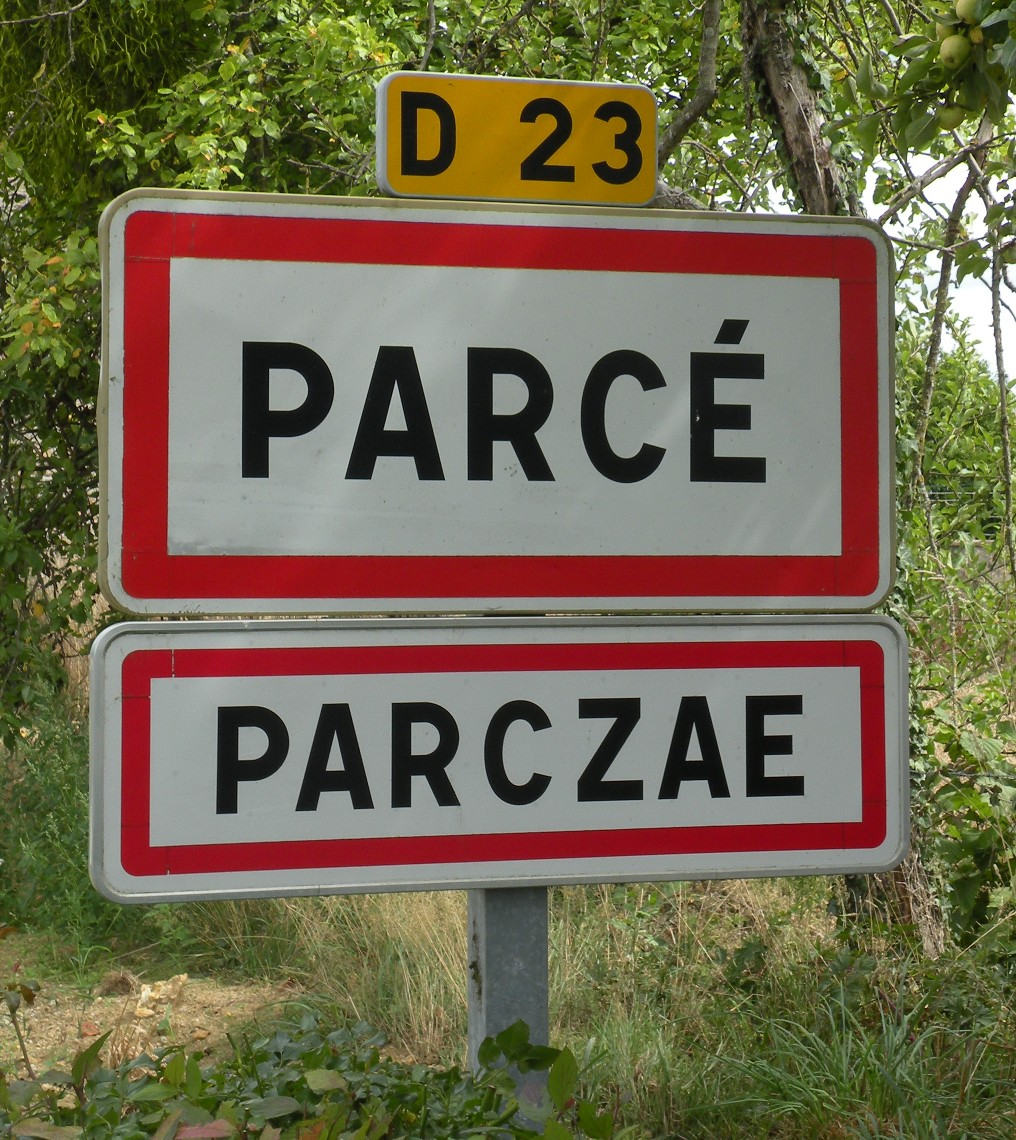
Signs in Gallo are very rare and the writing systems they use are unknown by most of the speakers.

Gallo is spoken on the eastern half of Brittany. It is not itself a Celtic language. Like French, it is also descended from Latin (and is classified in the Langues d'oïl branch), but has some Celtic influences, particularly in its vocabulary, whereas French has influences from both Celtic (Gaulish) and Frankish (the Germanic language which arrived after Latin in much of the rest of France).

Unlike Breton, Gallo does not have a long promotion history and it is still often perceived as a poor rural dialect. Moreover, because of its linguistic relationship with Gallo, French imposed itself more easily as the main language in Upper Brittany than in Breton speaking areas. Gallo was simply perceived as an incorrect way of speaking French rather than a separate language. Gallo transmission from parents to children is extremely low and efforts to standardise and publish books in Gallo did not reverse the decline of the language and its lack of prestige.

Gallo is also threatened by the Breton language revival, because Breton is gaining ground in territories that were not previously part of the main Breton-speaking area, and most of all because Breton appears as the national language of Brittany, thus leaving no place for Gallo.

Gallo had never been written before the 20th century, and several writing systems were created. They are however rarely known by the population and signs in Gallo are often unreadable, even for fluent speakers. In Loire-Atlantique, where Gallo is not promoted at all by the local authorities, many people do not even know the word "Gallo" and have no idea that it has writing systems and publications.

The Gallo community is estimated at between 28,300 and 200,000 speakers. The language is taught on a non-compulsory basis in some schools, high-schools and universities, particularly in Ille-et-Vilaine.

=== Religion ===
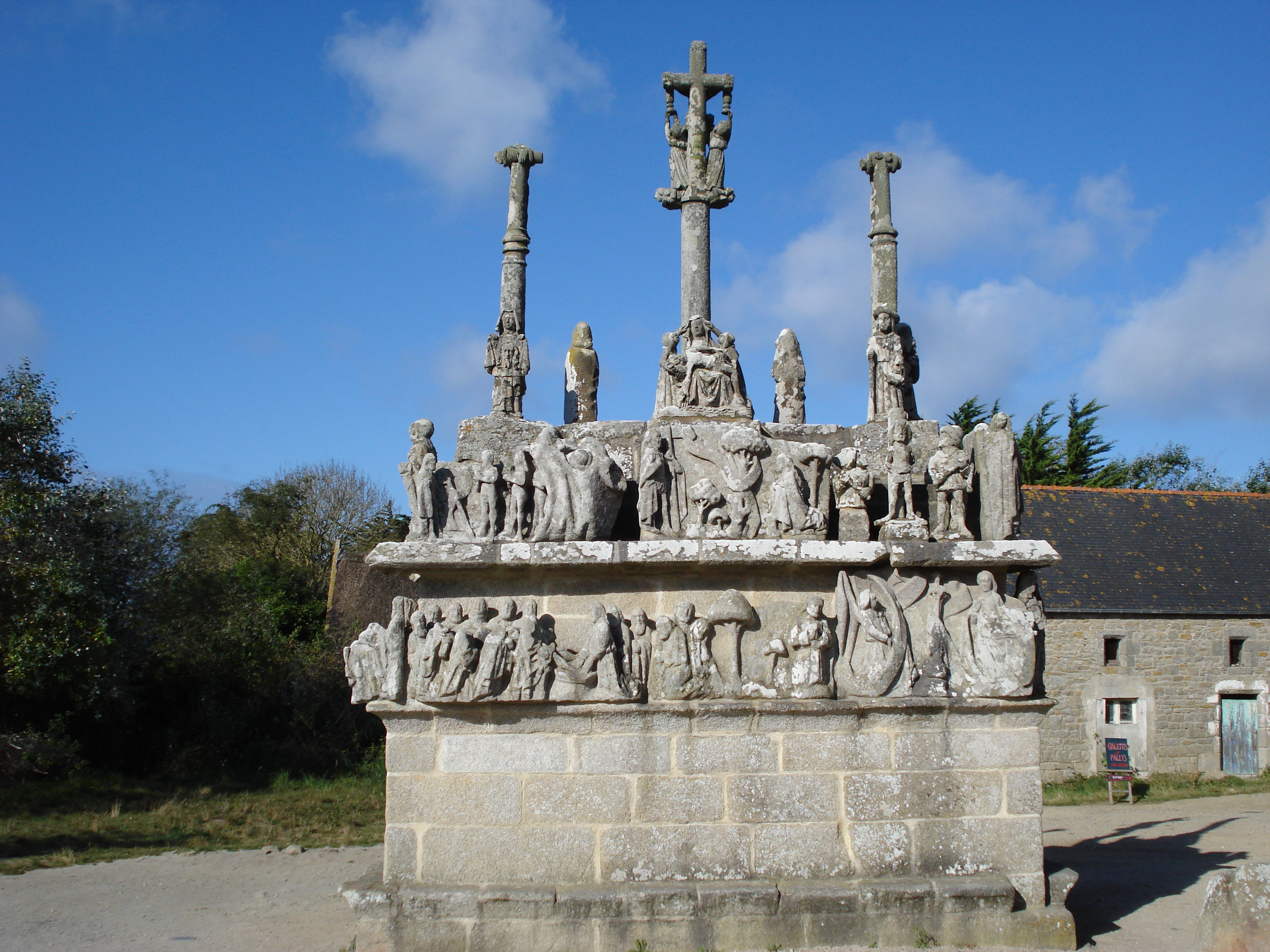
Sculpted "calvaries" can be found in many villages in Lower Brittany.

Bretons are mainly Catholic and the Christianisation occurred during the Roman Gaul and Frank era. During the Briton emigration to Brittany, several Christian missionaries, mostly Welsh, came in the region and founded dioceses. They are known as the "Seven founder saints":

- Paol Aorelian in Saint-Pol-de-Léon,
- Tudwal in Tréguier,
- Brieg in Saint-Brieuc,
- Maloù in Saint-Malo,
- Samsun of Dol in Dol-de-Bretagne,
- Paternus in Vannes,
- Kaourintin in Quimper.

Other notable early missionaries are Gildas and the Irish saint Columbanus. Bretons recognize more than 300 local "saints", though only a few are officially accepted by the Catholic Church. Since the 19th century at least, Brittany has been known as one of the most devoutly Catholic regions in France, together with the neighbouring Pays de la Loire region. The proportion of students attending Catholic private schools is the highest in France. The patron saint of Brittany is Saint Anne, the Virgin's mother, but Ivo of Kermartin, a 13th-century priest, called Saint-Yves in French and Sant-Erwan in Breton, can also be considered as a patron saint. His feast, 19 May, is Brittany's national day.

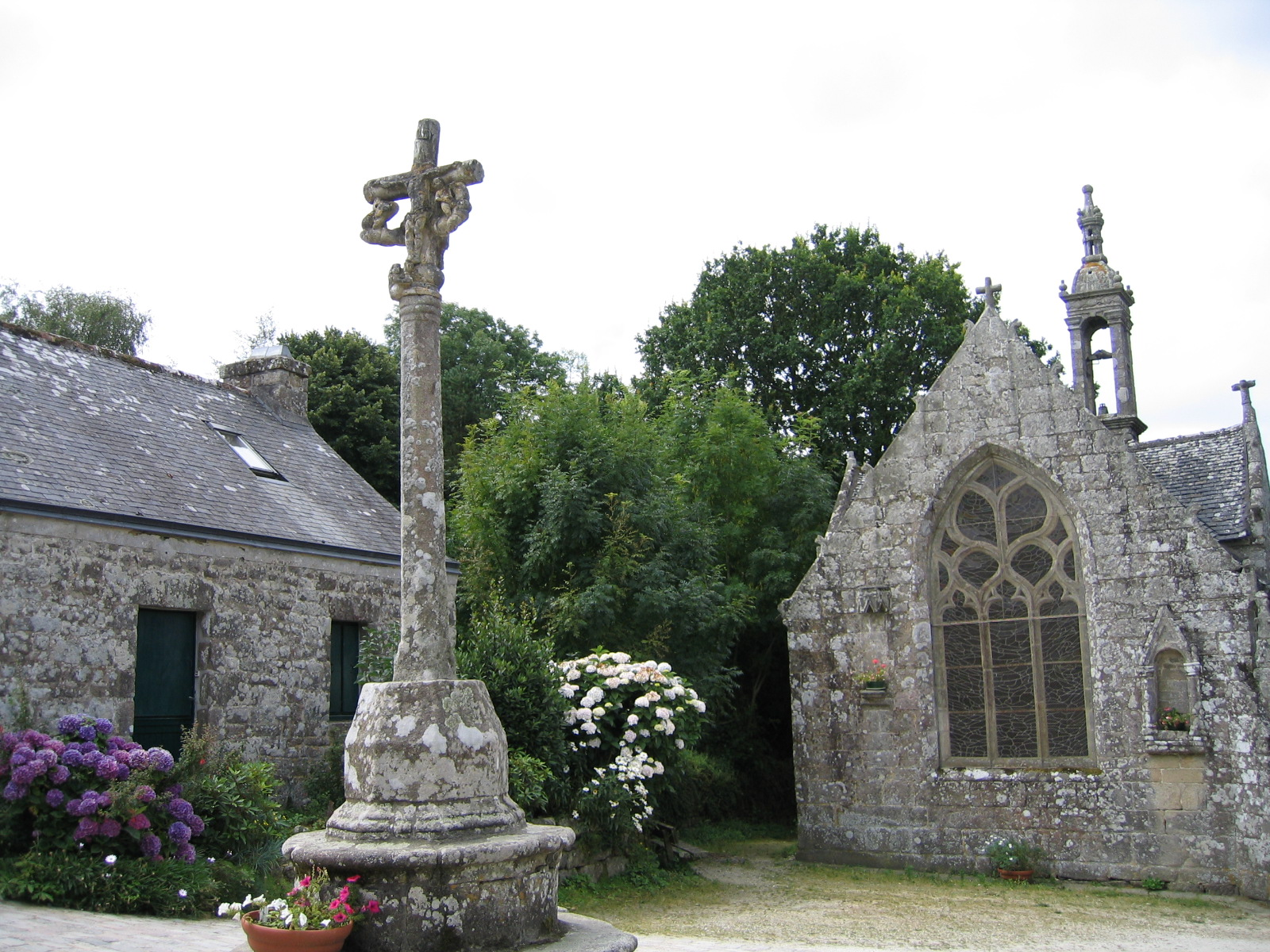
A chapel and a calvary in Locronan, Finistère

Many distinctive traditions and customs have also been preserved in Brittany. Among them, the "Pardons" are one of the most traditional demonstrations of popular Catholicism. These penitential ceremonies occur in some villages in Lower Brittany on the feast day of the parish's saint. The penitents form a procession and they walk together to a shrine, a church or any sacred place. Some Pardons are reputed for their length, and they all finish by large meals and popular feasts.

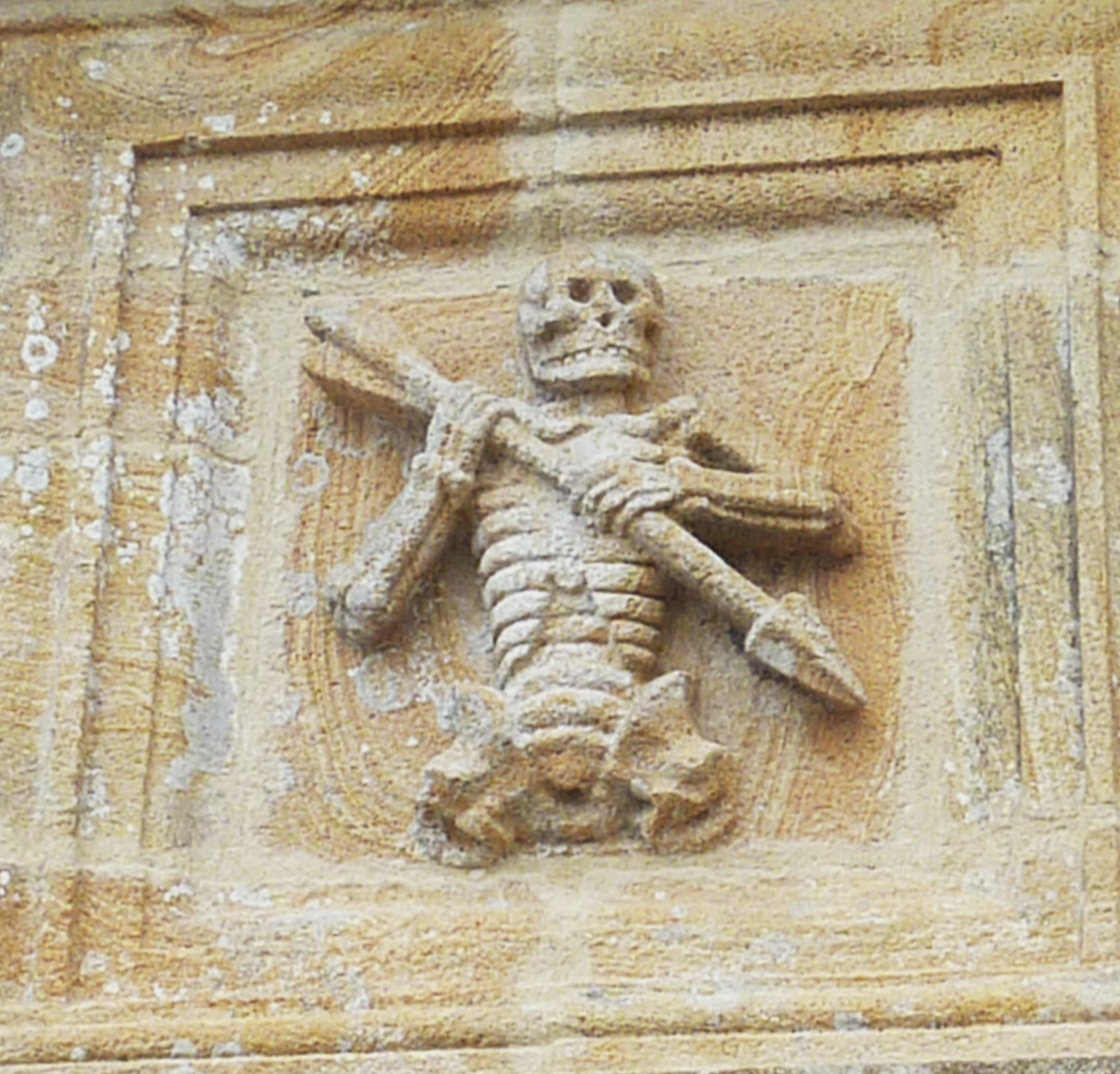
A sculpted Ankou in Ploudiry

There is a very old pilgrimage called the Tro Breizh (tour of Brittany), where the pilgrims walk around Brittany from the grave of one of the seven founder saints to another. Historically, the pilgrimage was made in one trip (a total distance of around 600 km) for all seven saints. Nowadays, however, pilgrims complete the circuit over the course of several years. In 2002, the Tro Breizh included a special pilgrimage to Wales, symbolically making the reverse journey of the Welshmen Sant Paol, Sant Brieg, and Sant Samzun.

The most powerful folk figure is the Ankou or the "Reaper of Death". Sometimes a skeleton wrapped in a shroud with the Breton flat hat, sometimes described as a real human being (the last dead of the year, devoted to bring the dead to Death), he makes his journeys by night carrying an upturned scythe which he throws before him to reap his harvest. Sometimes he is on foot but mostly he travels with a cart, the Karrig an Ankou, drawn by two oxen and a lean horse. Two servants dressed in the same shroud and hat as the Ankou pile the dead into the cart, and to hear it creaking at night means you have little time left to live.

As official religious statistics are forbidden in France, there are no official figures about religious practices in Brittany. However, successive polls show that the region has grown more nonreligious over time. Catholicism started to decline after the Second World War, during the urbanisation of Brittany. A poll conducted in 2006 showed that Morbihan was the only département to have a strong Catholic population, around 70% of its inhabitants belonging to that religion. Loire-Atlantique and Côtes-d'Armor were among the least Catholic French départements, with only 50% of the population practicing Catholics, while Ille-et-Vilaine and Finistère were at around 65%. Other religions are almost non-existent, apart from Islam which is practiced by between 1 and 3% of the inhabitants in Ille-et-Vilaine and Loire-Atlantique.

== Culture ==
=== Architecture ===
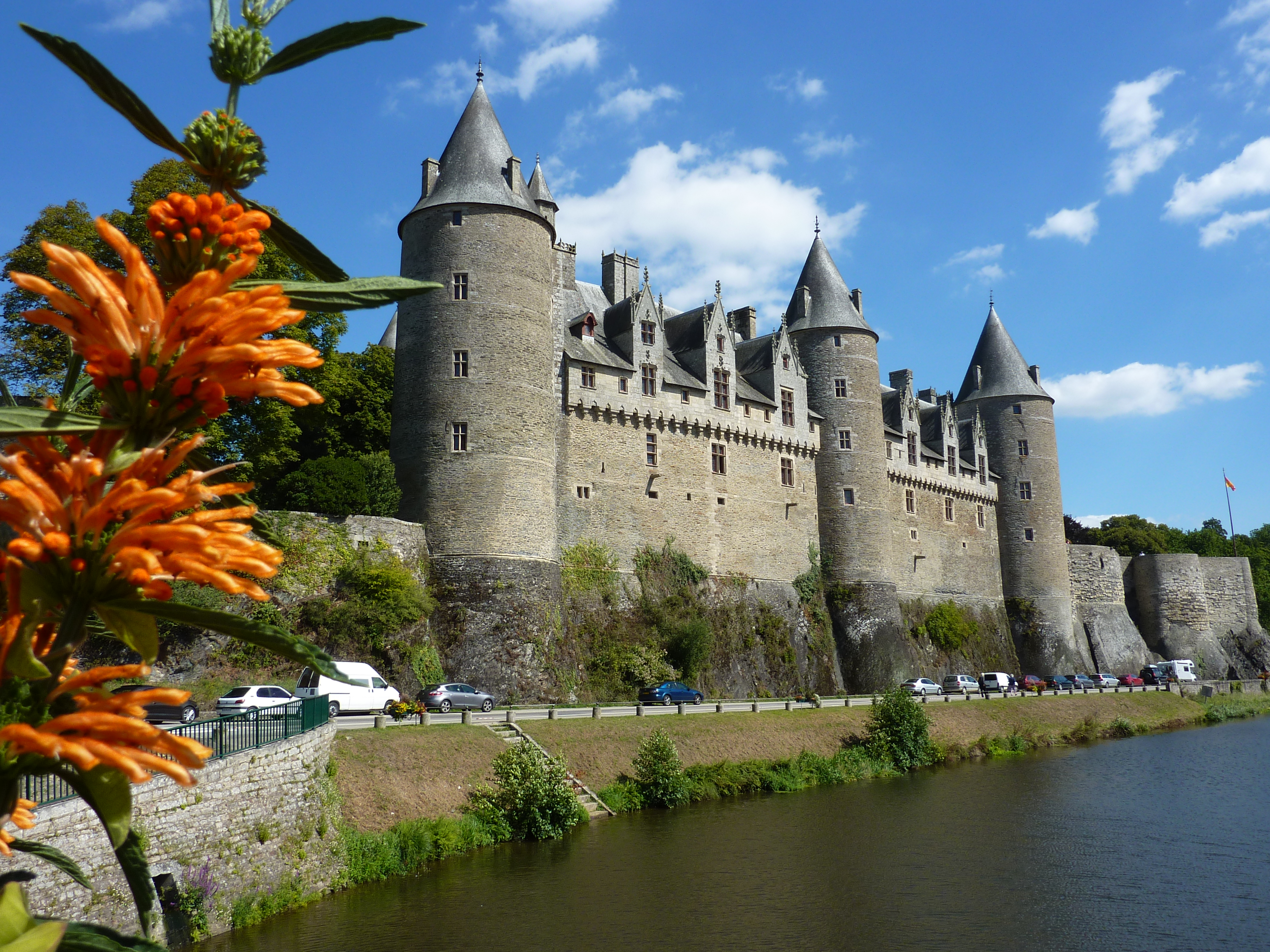
Josselin Castle

Brittany is home to many megalithic monuments; the words menhir and dolmen come from the Breton language. The largest menhir alignments are the Carnac stones. Other major sites include the Barnenez cairn, the Locmariaquer megaliths, the Menhir de Champ-Dolent, the Mane Braz tumulus and the Gavrinis tomb. Monuments from the Roman period are rare, but include a large temple in Corseul and scarce ruins of villas and city walls in Rennes and Nantes.

Brittany has a large number of medieval buildings. They include numerous Romanesque and French Gothic churches, usually built in local sandstone and granite, castles and half-timbered houses visible in villages, towns and cities. Several Breton towns still have their medieval walls, such as Guérande, Concarneau, Saint-Malo, Vannes, Fougères and Dinan. Major churches include Saint-Pol-de-Léon Cathedral, Tréguier Cathedral, Dol Cathedral, Nantes Cathedral and the Kreisker chapel. Most of the Breton castles were rebuilt between the 13th and the 15th century, such as the Château de Suscinio, the Château de Dinan, the Château de Combourg, the Château de Largoët, the Château de Tonquédec, the Josselin Castle and the Château de Trécesson. The most impressive castles can be seen along the border with France, where stand the Château de Fougères, the Château de Vitré, the Château de Châteaubriant and the Château de Clisson.

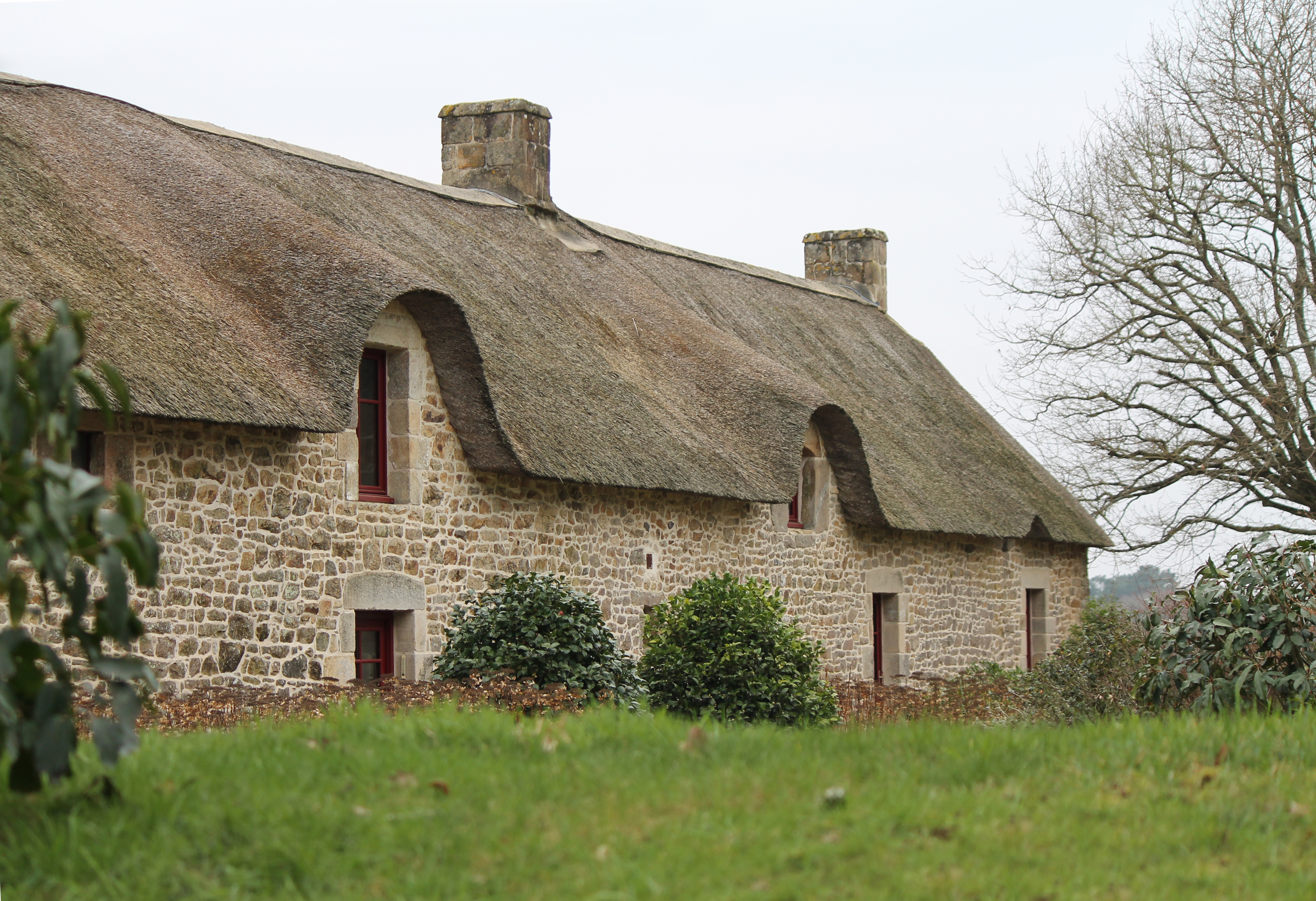
A traditional house in Plougoumelen

The French Renaissance occurred when Brittany lost its independence. The Renaissance architecture is almost absent in the region, except in Upper Brittany, close to the border with France. Major sites include the Château des ducs de Bretagne, the last permanent residence of the dukes, which displays the transition from late Gothic to Renaissance style. The Château de Châteaubriant, a former fortress, was transformed into a vast palace in the Italian style.

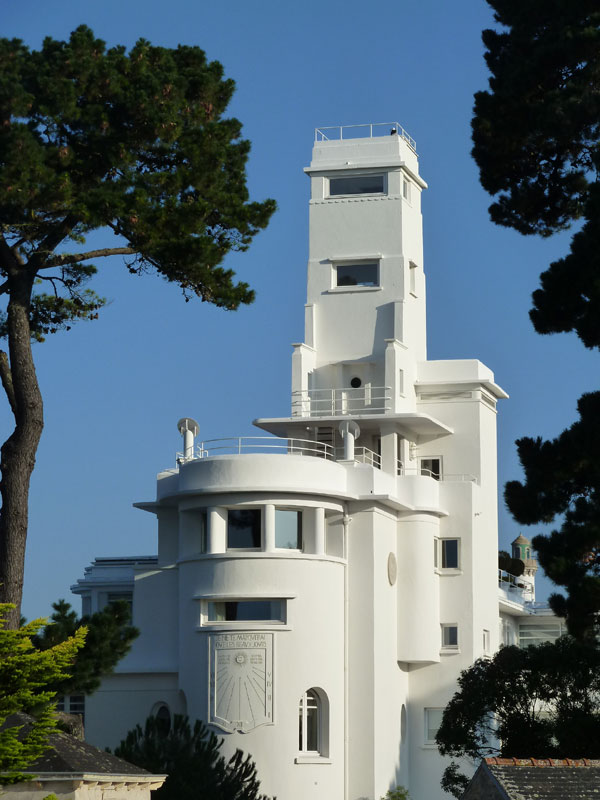
An Art Deco villa in Bénodet

In Lower Brittany, the medieval style never totally disappeared. However, local innovations permitted some changes and the birth of a particular style. Its most distinctive feature is the parish close, which displays an elaborately decorated church surrounded by an entirely walled churchyard. Many villages still have their closes, they date from the 16th and 17th centuries and sometimes include an elaborately carved calvary sculpture.

During the 17th and the 18th centuries, the main seaports and towns obtained a typical French look, with baroque and neoclassical buildings. Nantes, which was at the time the biggest French harbour, received a theatre, large avenues and quays, and Rennes was redesigned after a fire in 1720. At the same period, the wealthy ship-owners from Saint-Malo built many mansions called "Malouinières" around their town. Along the coast, Vauban and other French architects designed several citadels, such as in Le Palais and Port-Louis. In rural areas, Breton houses remained simple, with a single floor and a longhouse pattern. They were built with local materials: mostly granite in Lower Brittany and schist in Upper Brittany. Slates and reeds were usually used for roofing. During the 19th century, the Breton architecture was mainly characterised by the Gothic Revival and Eclecticism. Clisson, the southernmost Breton town, was rebuilt in an Italian Romantic style around 1820. The Breton lighthouses were mostly built during the 19th century. The most famous are Ar Men, Phare d'Eckmühl, La Vieille and La Jument. The lighthouse on the Île Vierge is, with 77 meters, the highest in Europe.

At the end of the 19th century, several seaside resorts were created along the coast and villas and hotels were built in historicist, Art Nouveau, and later in the Art Deco styles. These architectures are particularly present in Dinard, La Baule and Bénodet. Architecture from the 20th century can be seen in Saint-Nazaire, Brest and Lorient, three cities destroyed during the Second World War and rebuilt afterwards, and in the works of the Breton nationalist architects like James Bouillé and Olier Mordrel.

=== Fine arts ===
The Beautiful Angèle by Paul Gauguin

Until the 19th century, Catholicism had been the main inspiration for Breton artists. The region has a great number of baroque retables, made between the 17th and the 19th century. Breton sculptors were also famous for their ship models that served as ex-votos and for their richly decorated furniture, which features naïve Breton characters and traditional patterns. The box-bed is the most famous Breton piece of furniture. The Breton style had a strong revival between 1900 and the Second World War and it was used by the Seiz Breur movement. The Seiz Breur artists also tried to invent a modern Breton art by rejecting French standards and mixing traditional techniques with new materials. The leading artists of that period were the designer René-Yves Creston, the illustrators Jeanne Malivel and Xavier Haas, and the sculptors Raffig Tullou, Francis Renaud, Georges Robin, Joseph Savina, Jules-Charles Le Bozec and Jean Fréour.

Brittany is also known for its needlework, which can be seen on its numerous headdress models, and for its faience production, which started at the beginning of the 18th century. Quimper faience is known worldwide for its bowls and plates painted by hand, and other towns, such as Pornic, also maintain a similar tradition. The potteries usually feature naïve Breton characters in traditional clothing and daily scenes. The designs have a strong traditional Breton influence, but Orientalism and Art Deco have also been used.

Because of its distinct culture and natural landscape, Brittany has inspired many French artists since the 19th century. The Pont-Aven School, which started to emerge in the 1850s and lasted until the beginning of the 20th century, had a decisive influence on modern painting. The artists who settled in Pont-Aven wanted to break away from the Academic style of the École des Beaux-Arts and later from Impressionism when it began to decline. Among them were Paul Gauguin, Paul Signac, Marc Chagall, Paul Sérusier and Raymond Wintz. Before them, Brittany had also been visited by Academic and Romantic painters like Jean Antoine Théodore de Gudin and Jules Achille Noël who were looking for dramatic seascapes and storms.

=== Music ===
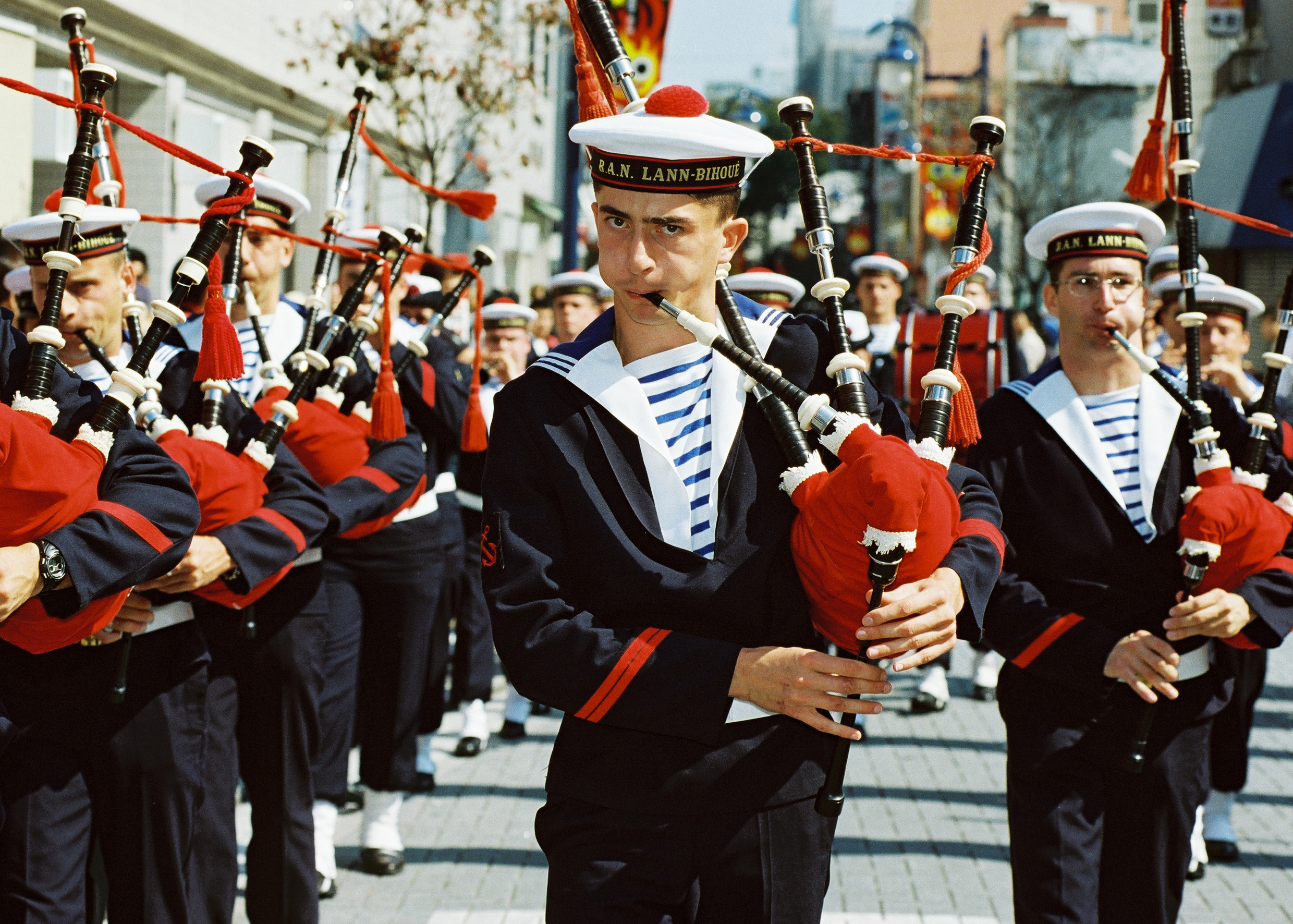
The Lann-Bihoué bagad

Since the early 1970s, Brittany has experienced a tremendous revival of its folk music. Numerous festivals were created, along with smaller fest-noz (popular feasts). The bagadoù, bands composed of bagpipes, bombards and drums (including snare), are also a modern creation, inspired by the Scottish pipe bands. The Lann-Bihoué bagad, one of the most well-known, belongs to the French Navy. It is the only one that does not take part to the annual bagadoù competitions. Celtic harp is also common, as are vocals and dances. The Kan ha diskan is the most common type of singing. The performers sing calls and responses while dancing. Breton dances usually imply circles, chains or couples and they are different in every region. The oldest dances seem to be the passepied and the gavotte, and the newest ones derive from the quadrille and French Renaissance dances.

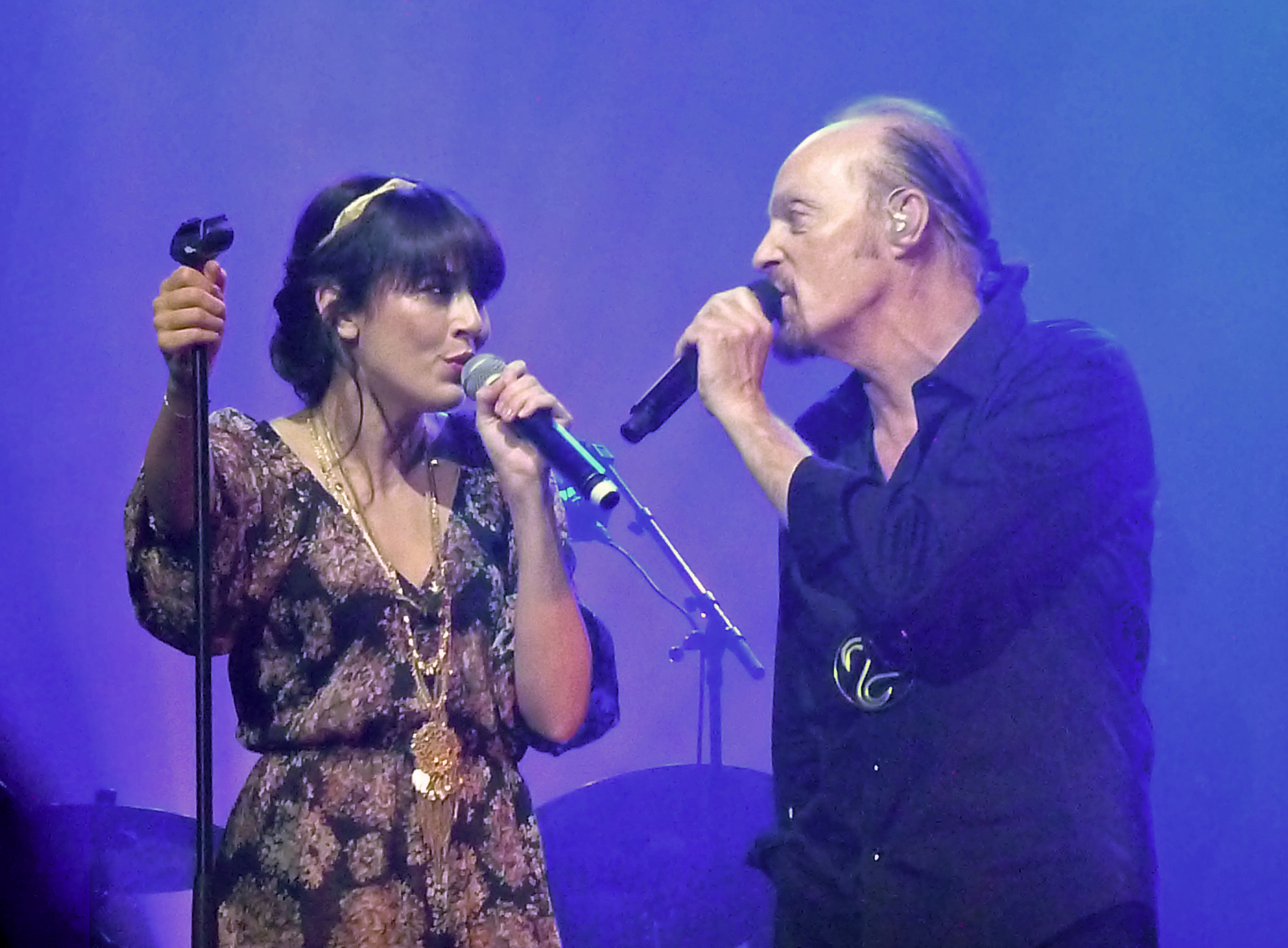
Nolwenn Leroy and Alan Stivell (2012)

In the 1960s, several Breton artists started to use contemporary patterns to create a Breton pop music. Among them, Alan Stivell contributed most in popularising the Celtic harp and Breton music in the world. He also used American rock and roll in his works and influenced 1970s Breton bands such as Kornog, Gwerz and Tri Yann, who revived traditional songs and made them popular across France. Soldat Louis is the main Breton rock band, and Breton singers include Gilles Servat, Glenmor, Dan Ar Braz, Yann-Fañch Kemener, Denez Prigent, Nolwenn Korbell and Nolwenn Leroy. The Manau Hip hop group from Paris has strong Breton and Celtic inspirations. You can also find the well known group Matmatah from Brest.

Yann Tiersen, who composed the soundtrack for Amélie, Cécile Corbel the compositor of Arrietty and the borrowers, the Electro band Yelle and the avant-garde singer Brigitte Fontaine are also from Brittany. The 19th-century composer Louis-Albert Bourgault-Ducoudray was one of the first western European composers to be influenced by what is now known as world music.

In 2022, Alvan and Ahez have been selected to represent France in the Eurovision Song Contest 2022. Their song, Fulenn, is sung entirely in Breton and is about the legend of Katel Kollet, a lady who dances with the devil.

=== Legends and literature ===
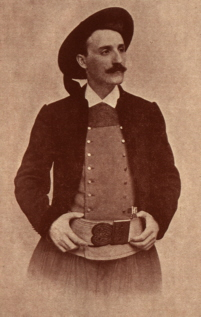
The singer-songwriter Théodore Botrel dressed in traditional Breton clothing

Brittany is closely associated with the Matter of Britain and King Arthur. According to Wace, Brocéliande is located in Brittany and it is nowadays considered to be Paimpont forest. There, ruins of a castle surrounded by a lake are associated with the Lady of the Lake, a dolmen is said to be Merlin's tomb and a path is presented as Morgan le Fay's Val sans Retour. Tristan and Iseult are also said to have lived in Brittany. Another major Breton legend is the story about Ys, a city swallowed by the ocean.

Breton literature before the 19th century was mostly oral. The oral tradition entertained by medieval poets died out during the 15th century and books in Breton were very rare before 1850. At that time, local writers started to collect and publish local tales and legends and wrote original works. Published between 1925 and the Second World War, the literary journal Gwalarn favoured a modern Breton literature and helped translating widely known novels into Breton. After the war, the journal Al Liamm pursued that mission. Among the authors writing in Breton are Auguste Brizeux, a Romantic poet, the neo-Druidic bard Erwan Berthou, Théodore Hersart de La Villemarqué, who collected the local legends about King Arthur, Roparz Hemon, founder of Gwalarn, Pêr-Jakez Helias, Glenmor, Pêr Denez and Meavenn.

Breton literature includes 19th-century historical novels by Émile Souvestre, travel journals by Anatole Le Braz, poems and novels by Charles Le Goffic, the works of the singer-songwriter Théodore Botrel and of the maritime writer Henri Queffélec. Brittany is also the birthplace of many writers like François-René de Chateaubriand, Jules Verne, Ernest Renan, Félicité Robert de Lamennais and Pierre Abélard Max Jacob, Alfred Jarry, Victor Segalen, Xavier Grall, Jean Rouaud, Irène Frain, Herve Jaouen, Alain Robbe-Grillet, Pierre-Jakez Hélias, Tristan Corbière, Paul Féval, Jean Guéhenno, Arthur Bernède, André Breton, Patrick Poivre d'Arvor.

The Asterix comics, set during the time of Julius Caesar and written in the second half of the twentieth century, are set in Armorica, now Brittany.

=== Museums ===
The Museum of Brittany, located in Rennes, was founded in 1856. Its collections are mainly dedicated to the history of the region. Museums dedicated to Prehistory and local megaliths are located in Carnac and Penmarch, while several towns like Vannes and Nantes have a museum presenting their own history.

The Museum of Fine Arts of Rennes owns a large collection of Egyptian, Greek and Roman antiquities as well as drawings and engravings by Domenico Ghirlandaio, Parmigianino, Albrecht Dürer and Rembrandt. Its French art collection gathers works by Georges de La Tour, François Boucher, Paul Gauguin, Auguste Rodin, Camille Corot and Robert Delaunay. It has also works by Pablo Picasso, Rubens, Peter Lely and Paolo Veronese. The collections of the Museum of Fine Arts of Nantes are more dedicated to modern and contemporary art and contain works by Edward Burne-Jones, Jean-Auguste-Dominique Ingres, Eugène Delacroix, Gustave Courbet, Paul Signac, Tamara de Lempicka, Wassily Kandinsky, Max Ernst, Pierre Soulages and Piero Manzoni. The Museums of Fine Arts of Brest and Quimper offer similar collections, with large quantities of French painting together with the works of some Italian and Dutch artists. The Museum of Fine Arts Pont-Aven is dedicated to the School of Pont-Aven. Contemporary sculptures can be seen in the park around the Château de Kerguéhennec, in Bignan.

Museums in Saint-Malo, Lorient and Douarnenez are dedicated to ships and maritime traditions and history. The Musée national de la Marine has a large annex in Brest and a submarine is opened to visitors in Lorient. In the same town, it is also possible to visit the Keroman Submarine Museum, and the Cité de la voile Éric Tabarly, a museum dedicated to sailing. In Saint-Nazaire, where many transatlantic ships were built, including SS Normandie and SS France, a museum showing transatlantic interiors was installed in a Second World War base. Nantes has a museum dedicated to Jules Verne, a Natural History Museum and a museum of archaeology and design, the Musée Dobrée.

=== Festivals ===
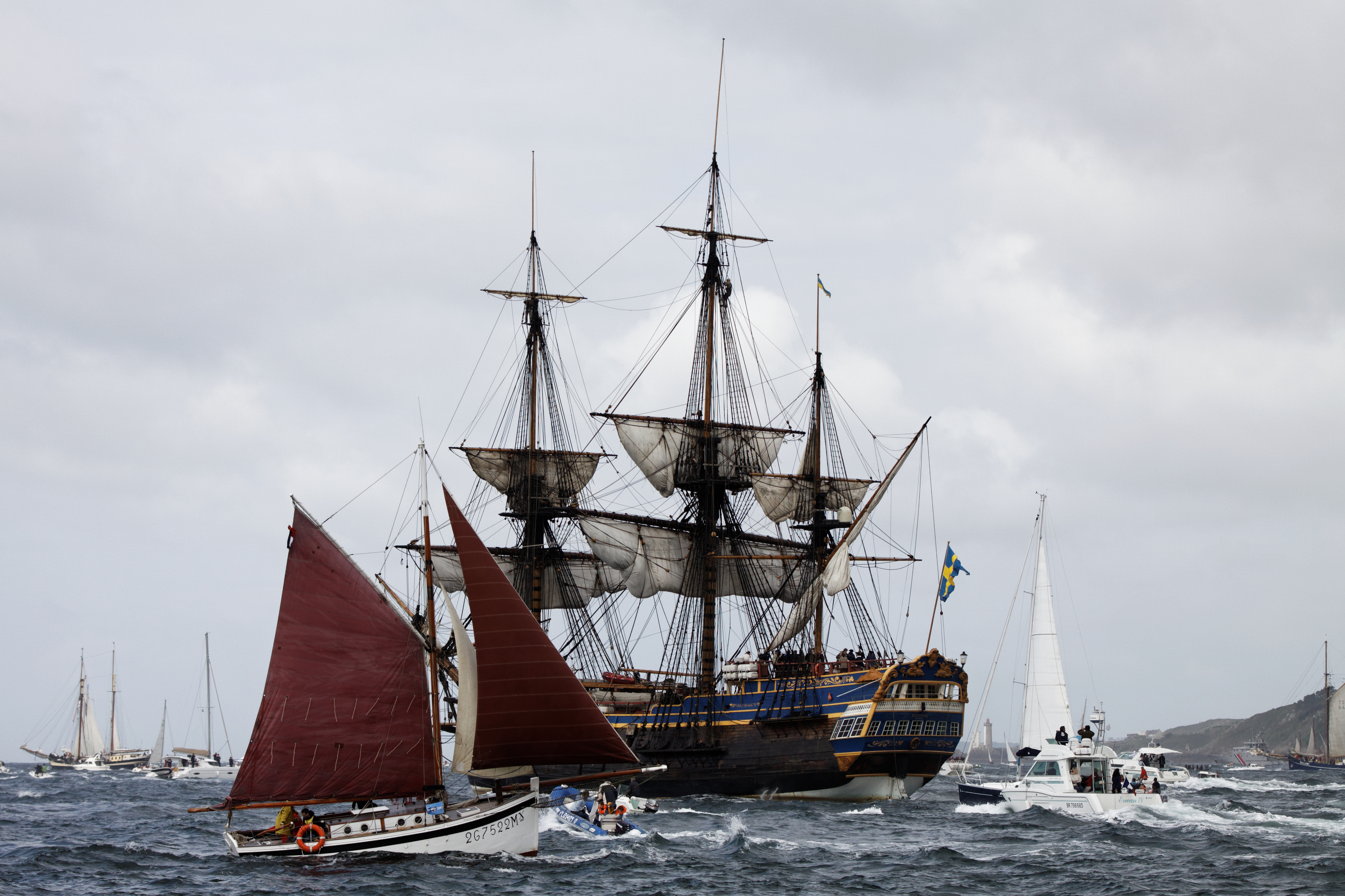
The Götheborg ship replica at the Brest tall ship meeting in 2012

Brittany has a busy calendar of festivals and events. It hosts some of France's biggest contemporary music festivals, such as La Route du Rock in Saint-Malo, the Vieilles Charrues in Carhaix, the Rencontres Trans Musicales in Rennes, the Festival du Bout du Monde in Crozon, the Hellfest in Clisson and the Astropolis in Brest, or La fête du bruit in Landerneau and Saint-Nolff. The Festival Interceltique de Lorient welcomes each year participants all the Celtic nations and their diasporas. La Folle Journée, in Nantes, is the largest classical music festival in France.

The Breton culture is highlighted during the Fête de la Bretagne, which occurs in many places around Saint-Yves's day (19 May), and during the Festival de Cornouaille in Quimper. Several towns also organise historical re-enactments and events celebrating local traditions, such as the Filets Bleus in Concarneau which celebrates fishing.

Brittany also has some film festivals like the Three Continents Festival in Nantes. The Utopiales international science fiction festival is held in the same city. Brest and Douarnenez both organise large tall ship meetings (See Brest Maritime Festival).

=== Sport ===
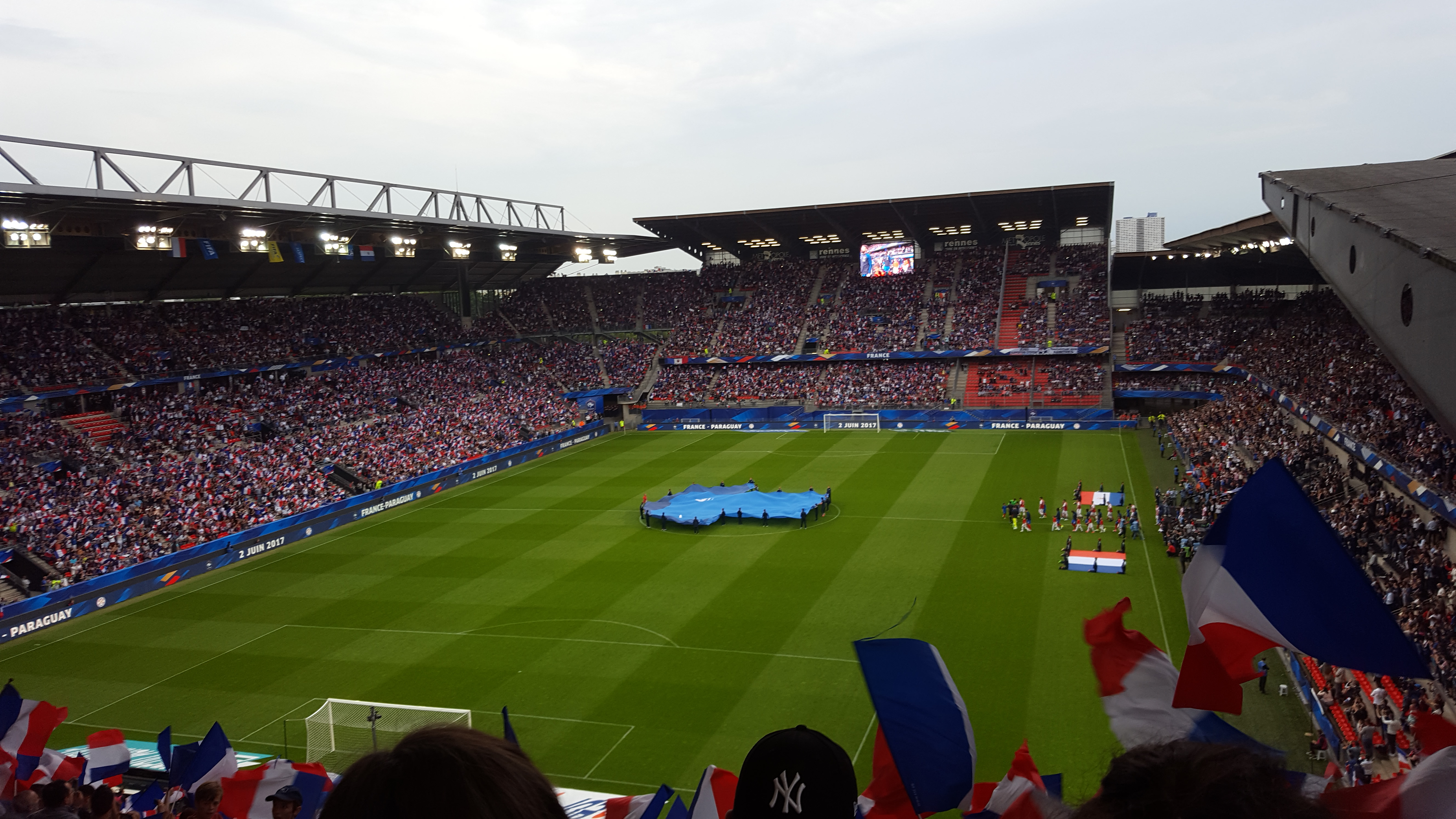
Roazhon Park in Rennes

Football, cycling and sailing are the three most popular sports in Brittany. Major football teams are the FC Nantes, the Stade Rennais F.C., the FC Lorient, the Stade Brestois 29, the Vannes OC and the En Avant de Guingamp. Professional footballers coming from the region also form the Brittany national football team which sometimes plays with national teams.

Several Bretons have won the Tour de France: Bernard Hinault, Louison Bobet, Jean Robic and Lucien Petit-Breton as riders, and Cyrille Guimard as a directeur sportif.

Rugby Union is less popular in the North than in the south of France, but Rugby Club Vannes are one of few professional teams in northern France. They currently play in the top tier of French Rugby, Top 14.

Sailing is particularly important for sea-resorts like La Trinité-sur-Mer, Pornichet, Concarneau, Lorient and the îles de Glénan, where a prestigious school is located. A great number of Bretons have become acclaimed sailors, such as: Éric Tabarly, Loïck Peyron, Jean Le Cam, Michel Desjoyeaux, Olivier de Kersauson, Thomas Coville, Vincent Riou and Marc Pajot. The Route du Rhum, the Transat Québec-Saint-Malo, the Jules Verne Trophy are the main Breton sailing competitions. The Solitaire du Figaro stages often start in Brittany.

Gouren, a style of folk wrestling, is the most popular Breton sport. The Boule bretonne is related to pétanque. The Palets, common in Upper Brittany and in other French regions, is also related to pétanque, but players use iron disks instead of balls and they have to throw them on a wooden board.

Gaelic football is also a growing sport in the region, with club teams and a 'county' GAA team representing Brittany against other European 'counties' such as Galicia.

=== Cuisine ===
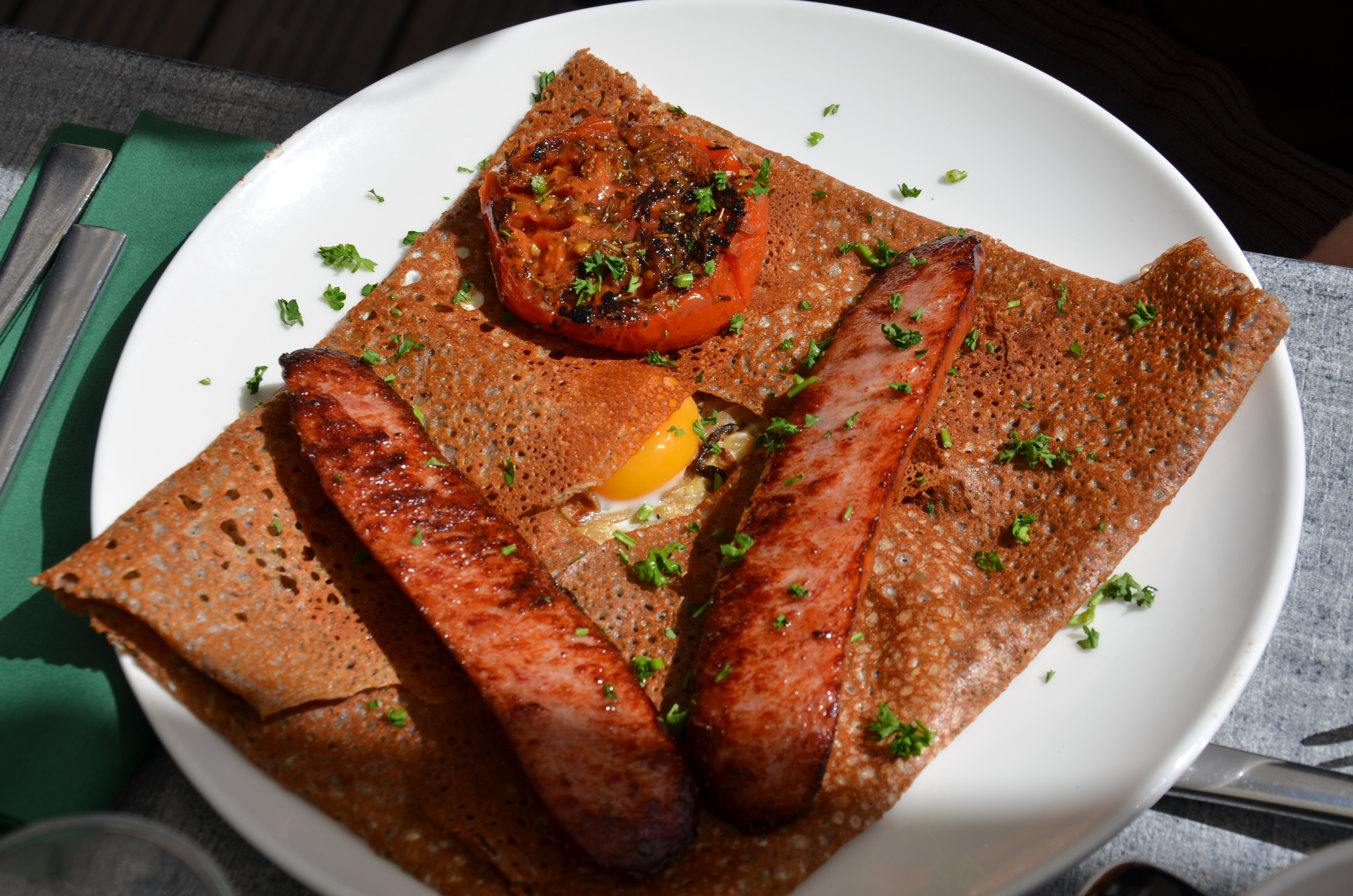
Galettes served with eggs and sausages

Crêpes and galettes are the two most well-known Breton dishes. The crêpes, made and served with butter, are eaten for dessert and the galettes are usually salty and made with buckwheat. They traditionally replaced bread as basic food and they can be served with cheese, sausages, bacon, mushrooms or eggs. They can be accompanied by Breton buttermilk called lait ribot. Brittany also has a dish similar to the pot-au-feu known as the kig ha farz, which consists of stewed pork or beef with buckwheat dumplings.

Surrounded by the sea, Brittany offers a wide range of fresh seafood and fish, especially mussels and oysters. Among the seafood specialities is a fish stew called cotriade. The beurre blanc sauce, invented in Saint-Julien-de-Concelles, close to Nantes, is often served with fish. Brittany is also known for its salt, mainly harvested around Guérande and used in butter and milk caramels.

The region is notable for its biscuit factories, many towns having their own: Quimper, Lorient, Pont-Aven, Saint-Brieuc, BN and LU in Nantes, La Trinitaine in La Trinité-sur-Mer, and Galettes Saint-Michel in Saint-Michel-Chef-Chef. They usually make their biscuits with salted butter and sell them in iron boxes. Famous Breton pastries include the kouign amann ("butter cake" in Breton) made with bread dough and high quantities of butter and sugar, and the far, a sort of sweet Yorkshire pudding usually made with dried plums.

Breton cider served in a cup

Although Muscadet and Gros Plant white wines are produced south of the Loire, the traditional drink of Brittany is cider. Brittany is the second-largest cider-producing region in France. Breton cider is traditionally served in a bowl or a cup. Brittany also has a long beer-brewing tradition, tracing its roots back to the 17th century. Young artisanal brewers are keeping a variety of beer types alive, such as Coreff de Morlaix, Tri Martolod and Britt. Stronger alcohols include the chouchen, a sort of mead made with wild honey, and an apple eau de vie called lambig.

== Transport ==
=== Road ===
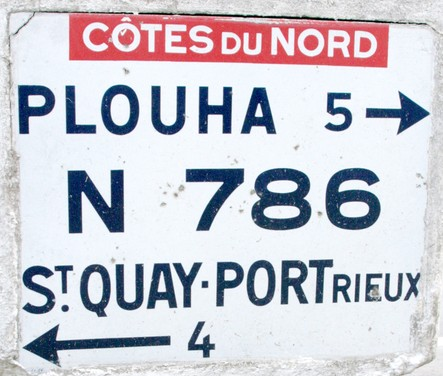
An old road sign on the Route Nationale 786 in Tréveneuc

Until the 1970s, the Breton road network was poor because maritime and rail transport prevailed. The French president Charles de Gaulle implemented a major road construction plan in 1970 and Brittany received over 10 billion francs of investments during 25 years. More than 10,000 km of motorways were built, permitting Breton road transport to multiply by four. The Breton motorways are not toll roads, contrarily to the usual French highways.

The main road artery linking cities and other settlements along the north coast is the Route nationale 12 which connects the cities of Rennes, Saint-Brieuc, Morlaix and Brest. It also provides a link to southern Normandy, terminating in Paris. In south Brittany the Route nationale 165 performs a similar role along the south coast providing connections between Nantes, Vannes, Lorient, Quimper and Brest. The Route nationale 164 crosses the centre of the peninsula and connects Rennes to Loudéac, Carhaix and Châteaulin, and the Route nationale 166 links Rennes to Vannes. The Route nationale 137 provides connections between Saint-Malo, Rennes and Nantes and terminates in Bordeaux.

Nantes is linked to Paris by the A11 autoroute, and Rennes is both on the A81 autoroute to Paris and the A84 autoroute to Caen. These highways are standard French toll roads.

=== Air ===
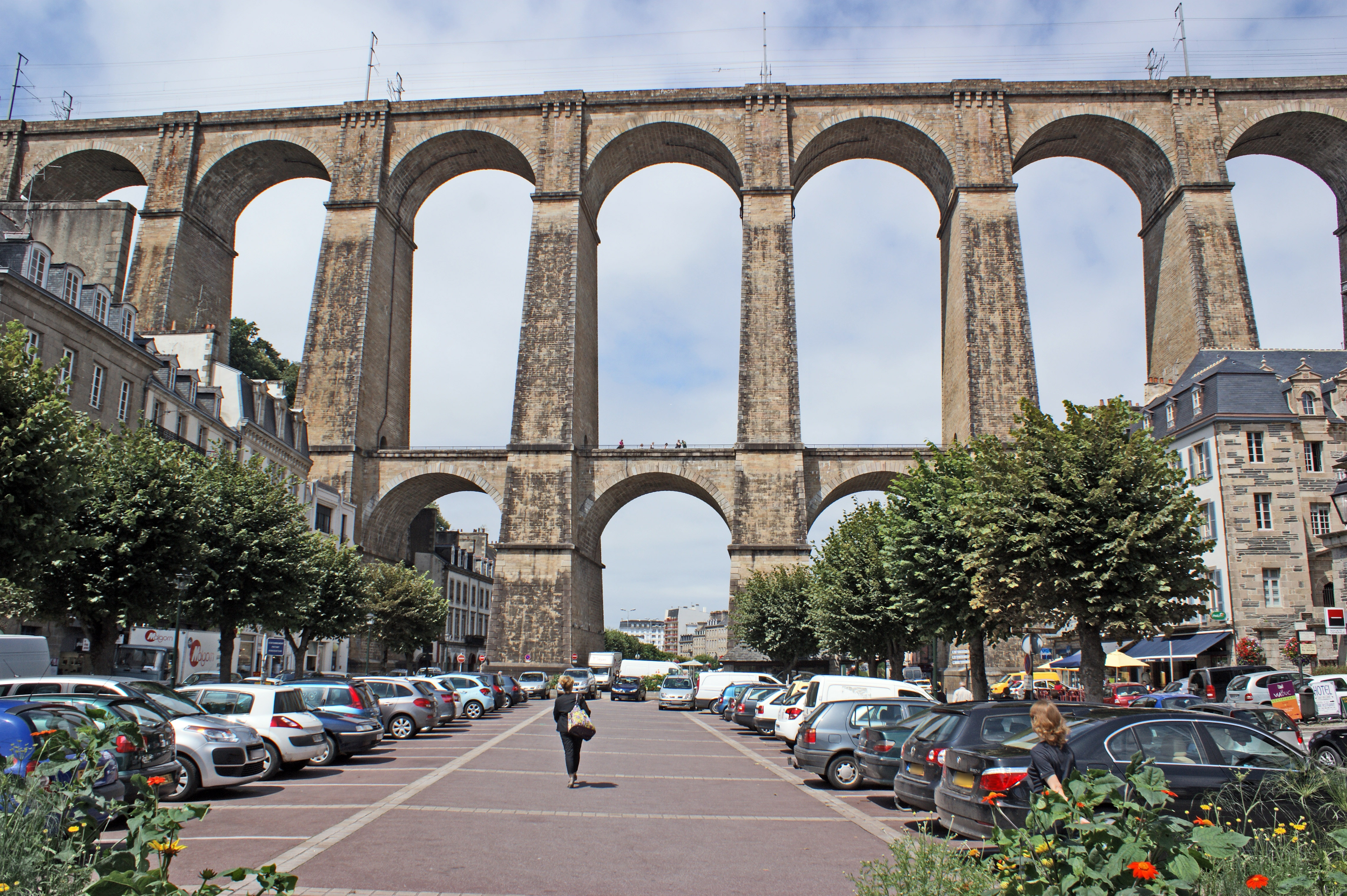
The Morlaix railway viaduct is one of the highest in France.

The biggest Breton airport is Nantes Atlantique Airport. Destination served include the United Kingdom, Italy, Germany, Ireland and Morocco. The Brest Bretagne Airport is the second airport in Brittany. It is followed by Rennes – Saint-Jacques, Lorient South Brittany and Dinard – Saint-Malo. The Saint-Brieuc – Armor airport serves flights between Brittany and the Channel Islands. Others smaller airport operates domestic flights in Quimper, and Lannion.

=== Rail ===
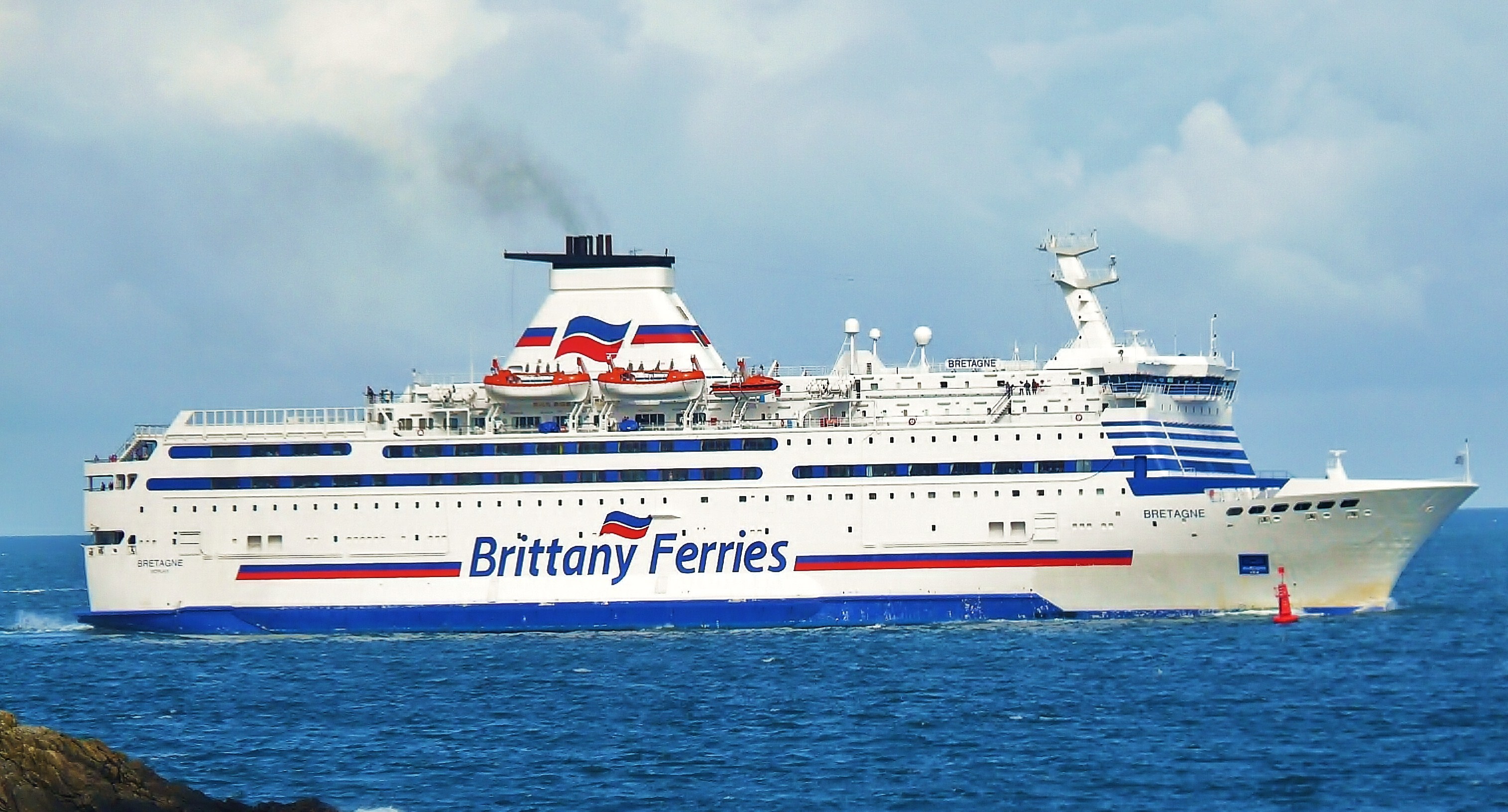
The Brittany Ferries MS Bretagne off Saint-Malo

Brittany is on two major TGV lines, one linking Paris to Nantes and Le Croisic, on the south coast, and another linking Paris to Rennes and Brest. An extension of the LGV Atlantique, which stops at Le Mans, was completed in 2017, bringing the line to Rennes. This extension is known as the LGV Bretagne-Pays de la Loire. TGV services also link the region with major cities in France such as Lyon, Strasbourg, Marseille, and Lille. Regional services are operated by TER Bretagne providing connections between small towns such as Vannes, Carhaix, Roscoff and Paimpol. TER Bretagne also manages coach lines and connections between Rennes and Nantes. TER Pays de la Loire operates trains between Nantes and smaller towns in Loire-Atlantique.

=== Sea ===
There are ferry services that take passengers, vehicles and freight to Ireland, the United Kingdom and the Channel Islands. The main companies are Brittany Ferries which operates lines between Plymouth and Roscoff, Portsmouth and Saint-Malo, and Roscoff and Cork. Irish Ferries operates the route Rosslare-Roscoff and Condor Ferries link Saint-Malo with Jersey.

=== Cycling ===
Cycling has always been one of the main sports of Brittany, but leisure cycling and the infrastructure to support it have been growing extremely rapidly. An extensive network of cycle paths and recommended cycle routes has opened up all over the region. Some of these are routes using mainly smaller roads and both signposted and maintained by communes individually, but many are based on dedicated cycle paths often formed by converting disused railway tracks. These help form routes such as 'Vélodyssée' from Roscoff to Nantes and several major routes under the 'V' label (following signs V1, V2 etc.). The old tow-path of the Nantes-Brest canal is now open to cyclists along its entire 385 km length though in places (unlike rail-based cycle paths) it is very meandering and leaving the path will both shorten the distance and provide variety.

== Symbols ==
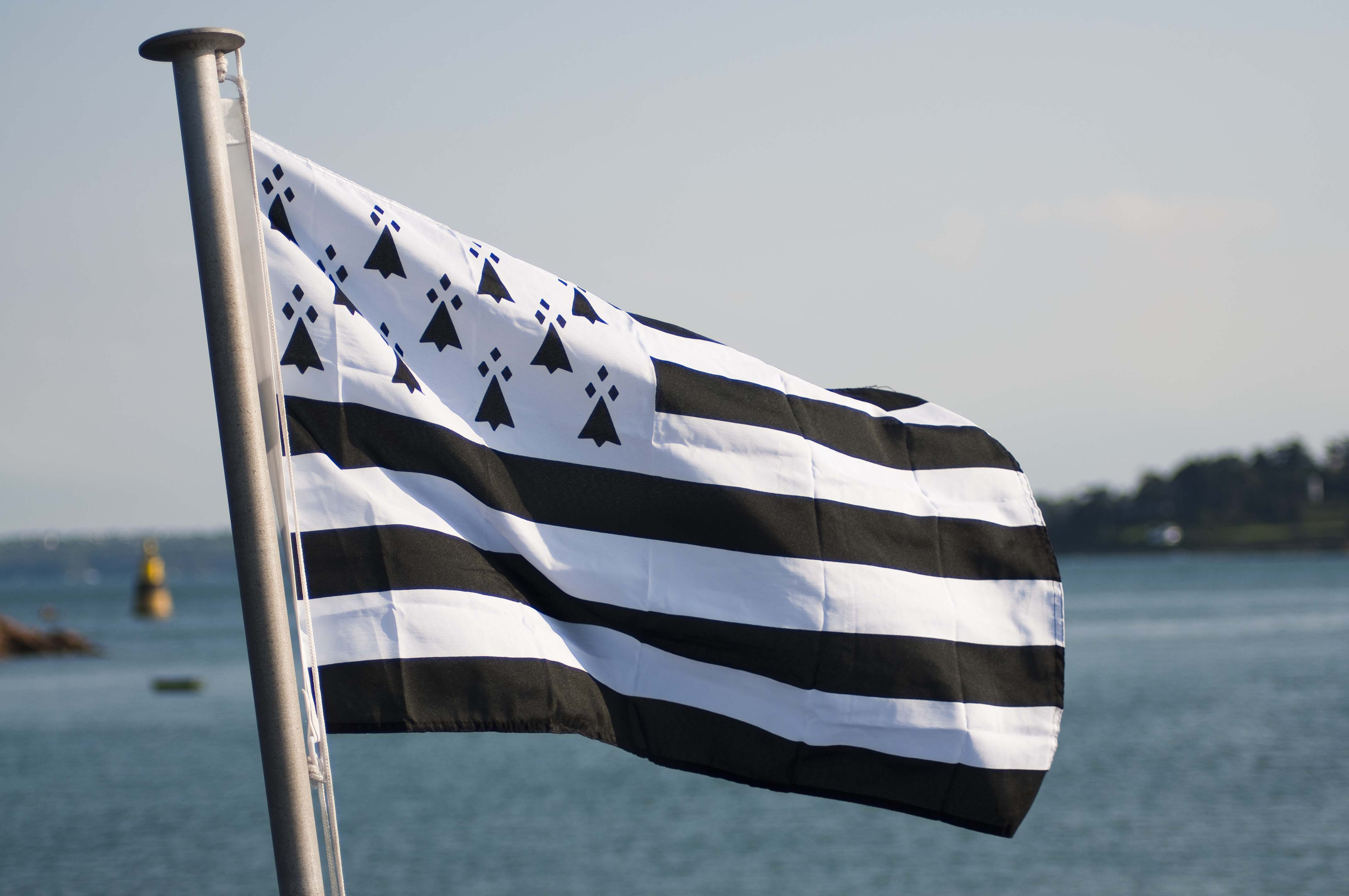
The modern flag of Brittany

The modern flag of Brittany was designed in 1923. It is called Gwenn ha Du ("white and black" in Breton) and it features eleven ermine spots (their number may vary) and nine stripes, the black ones represent the Breton speaking historical dioceses, and the white ones symbolise the gallo speaking dioceses. The flag was created to replace the traditional ermine plain standard, considered too aristocratic and royalist. It was inspired by the American flag and the British Red Ensign. Since the 1920s, the flag has become very popular and it is flown from a large number of institutions. Apart from the ermine flag, Breton historic banners include the Kroaz Du, a white flag with a black cross, the perfect negative of the Cornish flag.

The ermine was the badge of several dukes of Brittany.

The coat of arms of Brittany, ermine plain, was adopted by John III in 1316. Ermine had been used in Brittany long before, and there is no clue to its origin. It was probably chosen by the dukes because of its similarity with the French fleur-de-lis. The ermine, or stoat, as an animal became the badge of John IV at the end of the 14th century. It appeared later on numerous locations, including churches and castles. According to popular traditions, Anne of Brittany was hunting with her court when she saw a white ermine who preferred to die than to cross a dirty marsh. This episode would have inspired the duchess' motto : "Potius mori quam foedari" ("rather death than dishonour"). The motto has later been reused by Breton regiments, local World War II Resistants and cultural movements.

The Breton anthem, although not official, is Bro Gozh ma Zadoù – ("Old Land of My Fathers"). It re-employs both the Welsh anthem's music and that of "Bro Goth agan Tasow" (the national anthem of Cornwall; its lyrics were written at the end of the 19th century).

Colloquial Breton emblems include the Celtic triskelion, the menhirs and dolmens, local dishes such as the galettes, the bigoudène headdress and the traditional black round hat, the fisherman and his yellow raincoat, etc. BZH is a common abbreviation for "Breizh" ("Brittany" in Breton) and people often put BZH stickers on their car-plates, although it is forbidden under French laws. .bzh is an approved Internet top level domain for the Breton culture and languages.

== Gallery ==
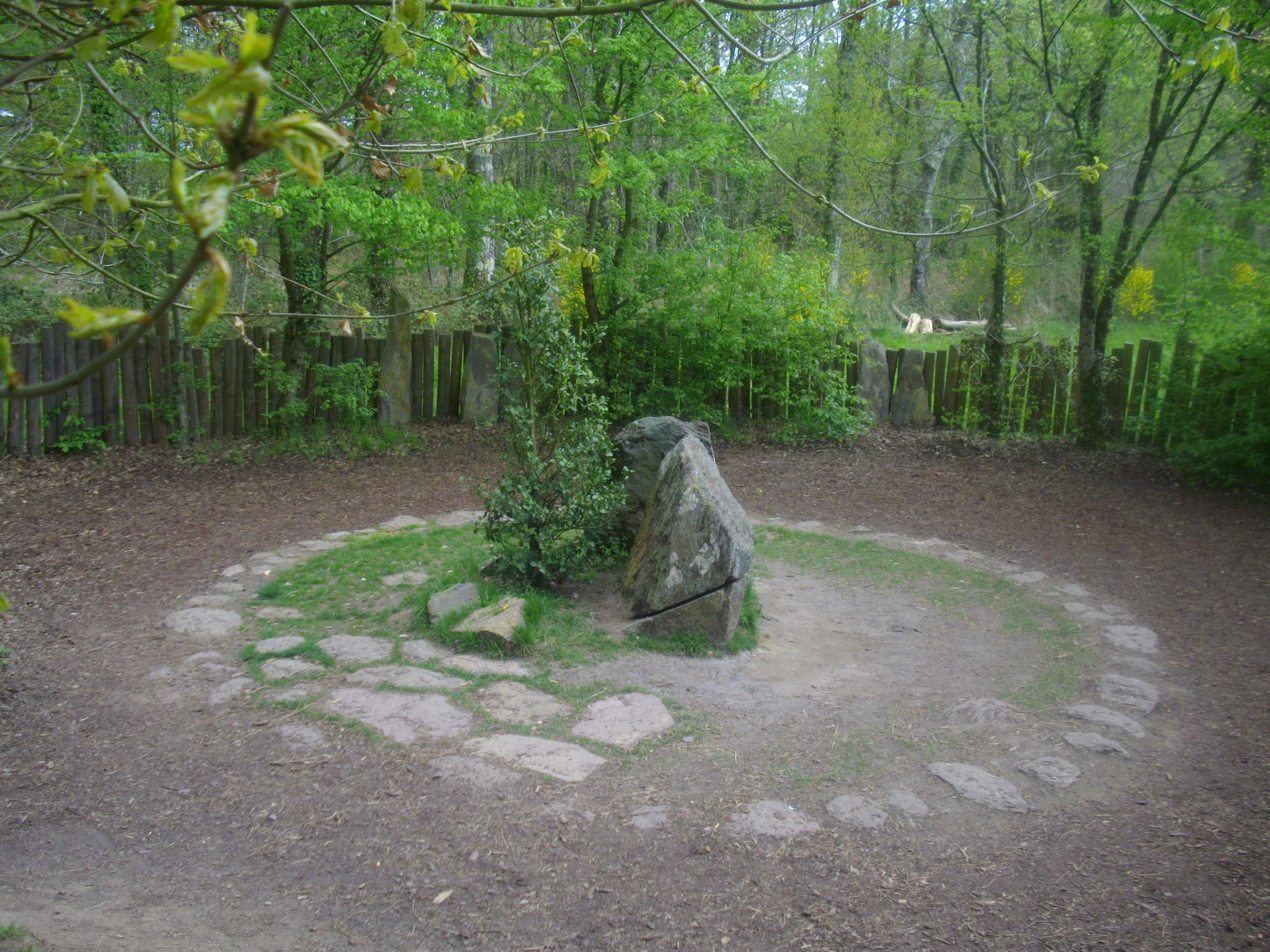
Merlin's tomb in the Brocéliande forest, Paimpont

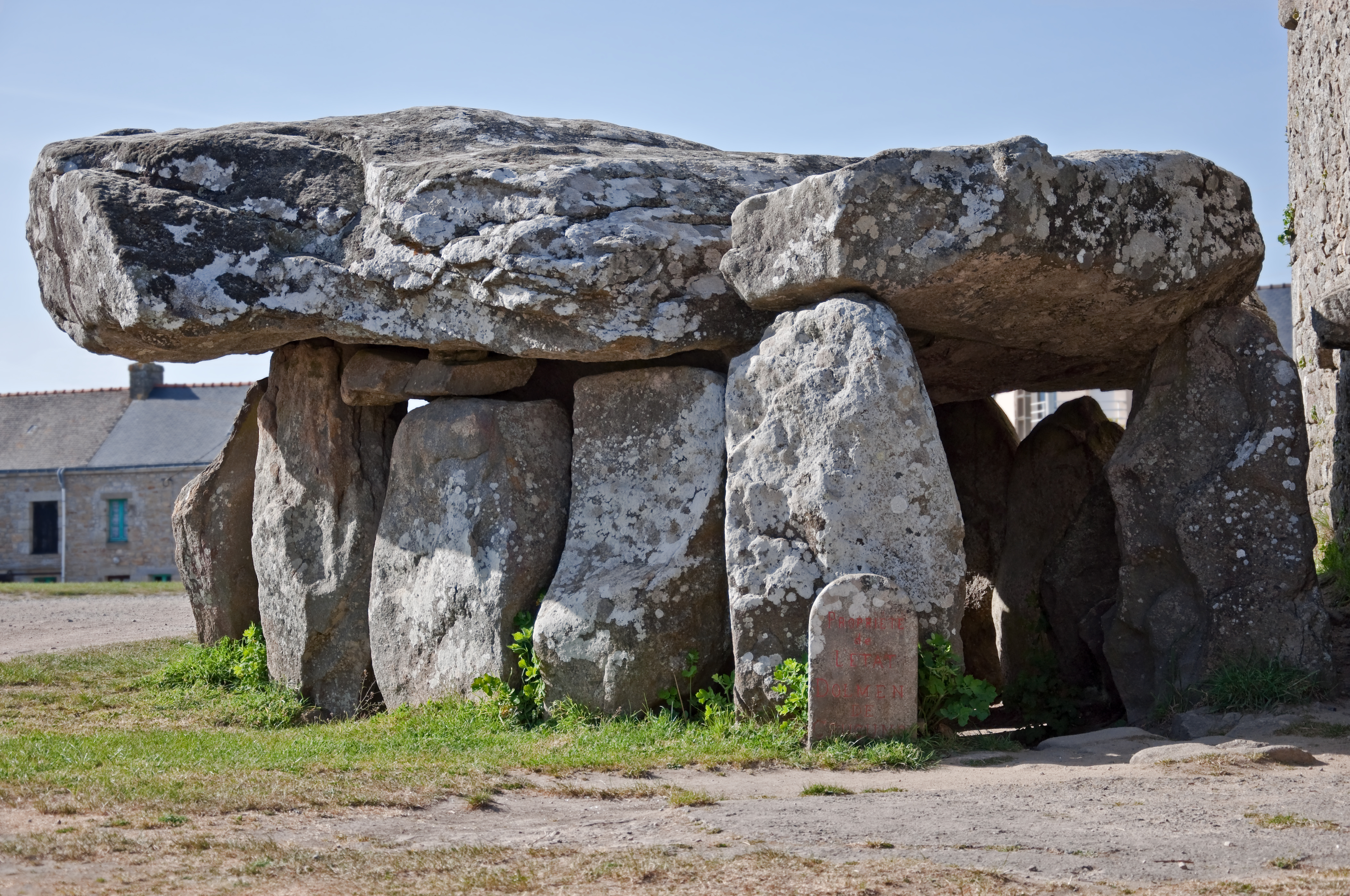
A dolmen in Plouharnel

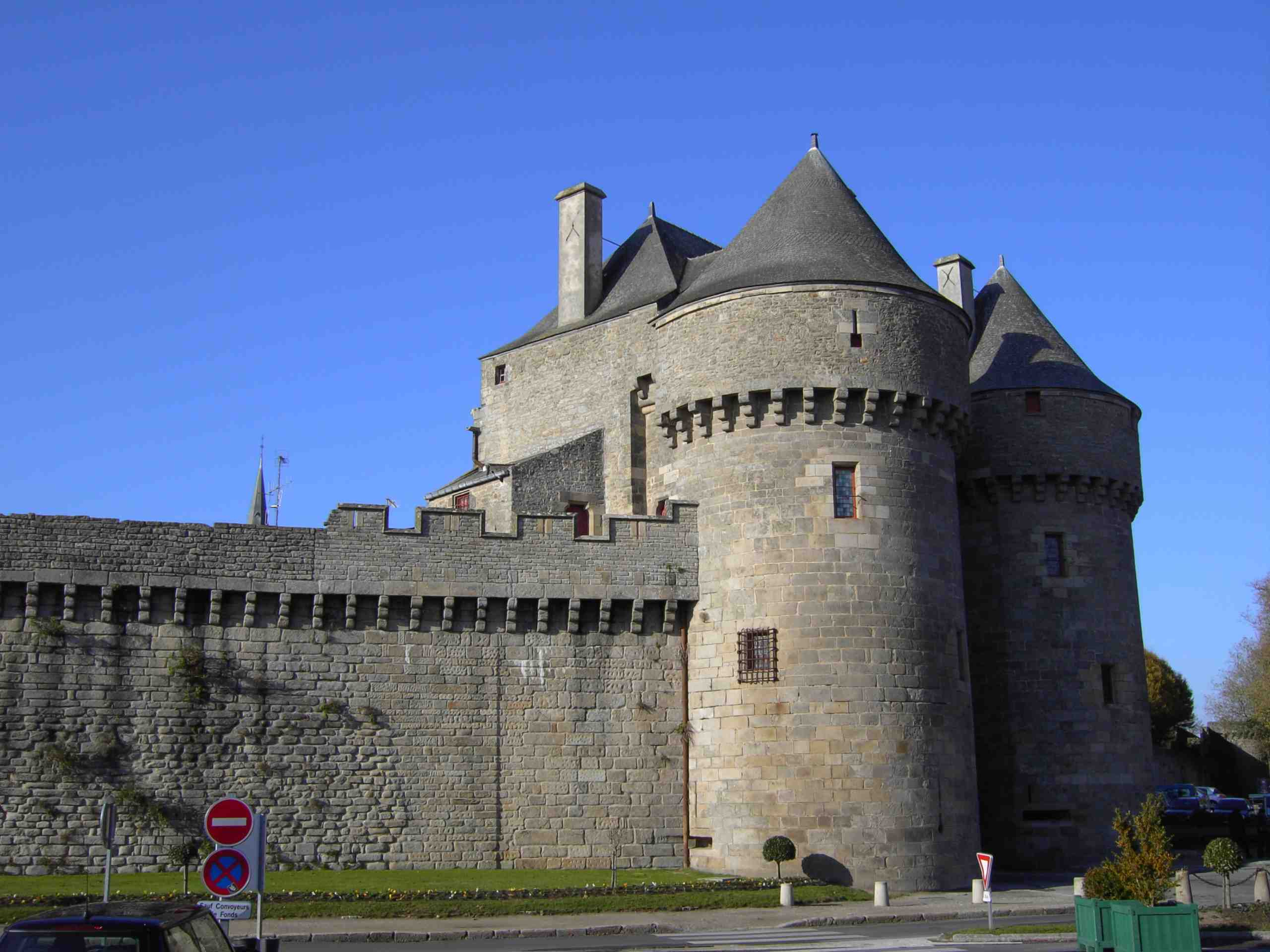
The city wall of Guérande

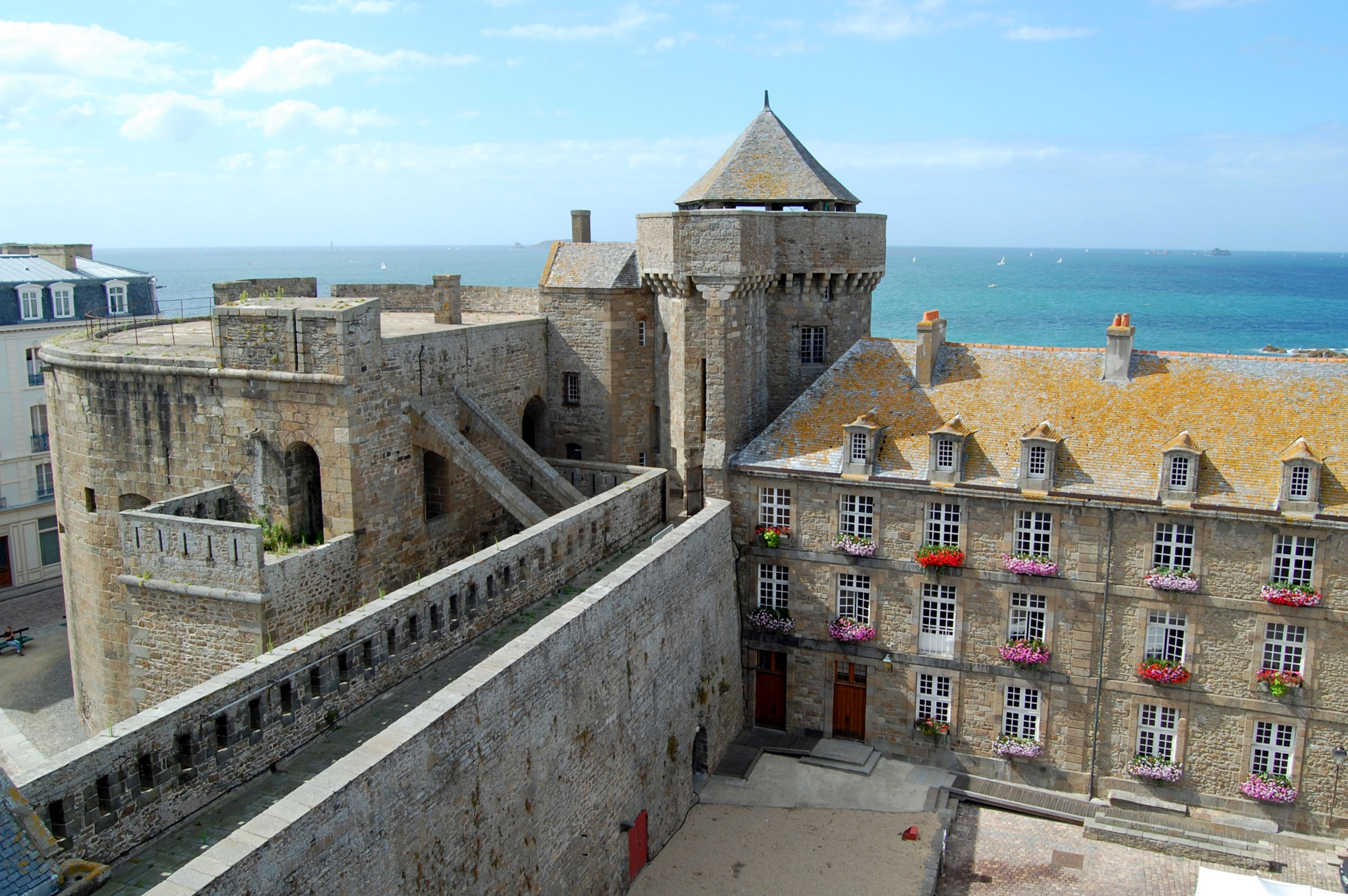
Castle of Saint-Malo, Qui Qu'en Grogne Tower

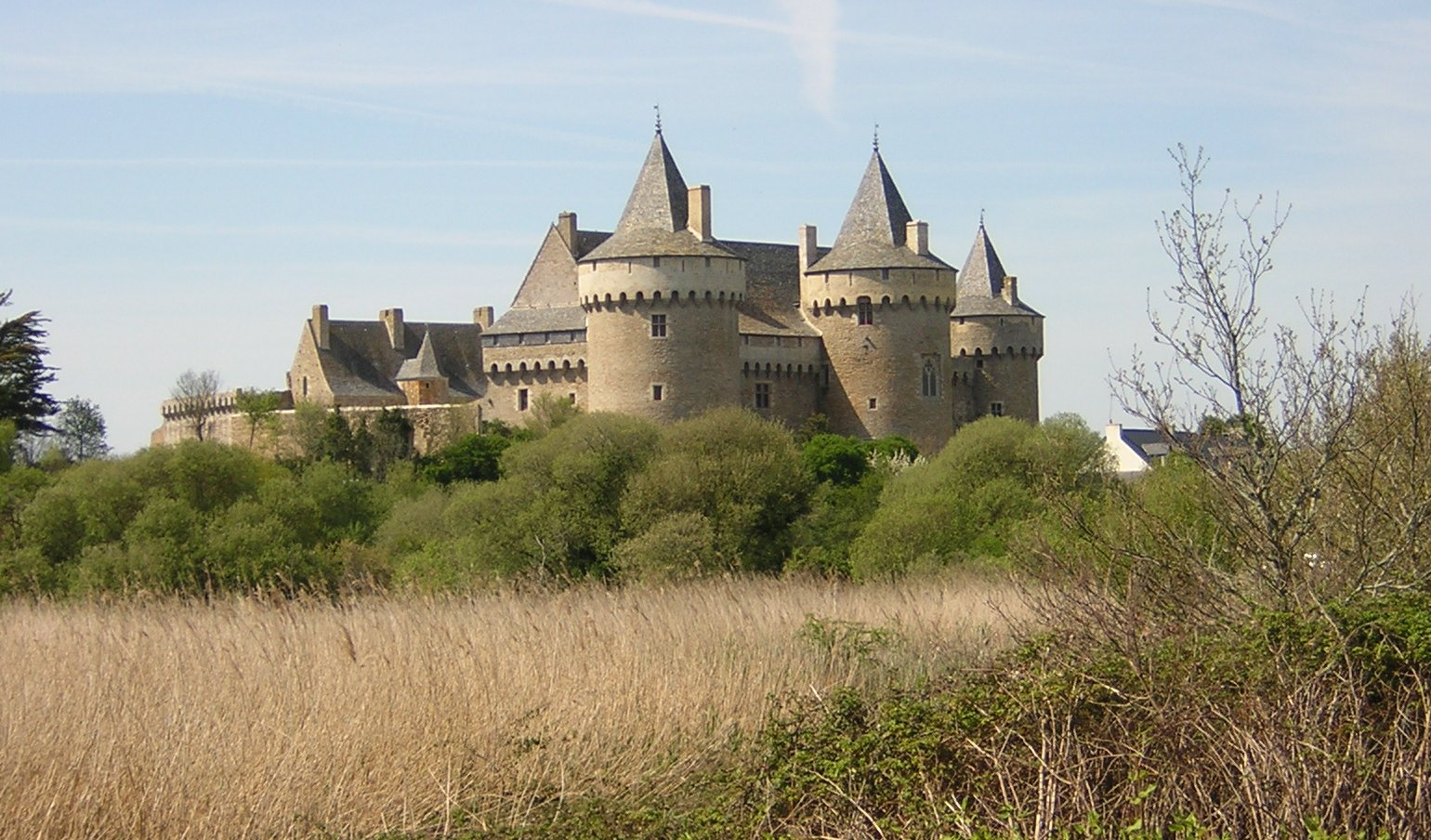
Château de Suscinio

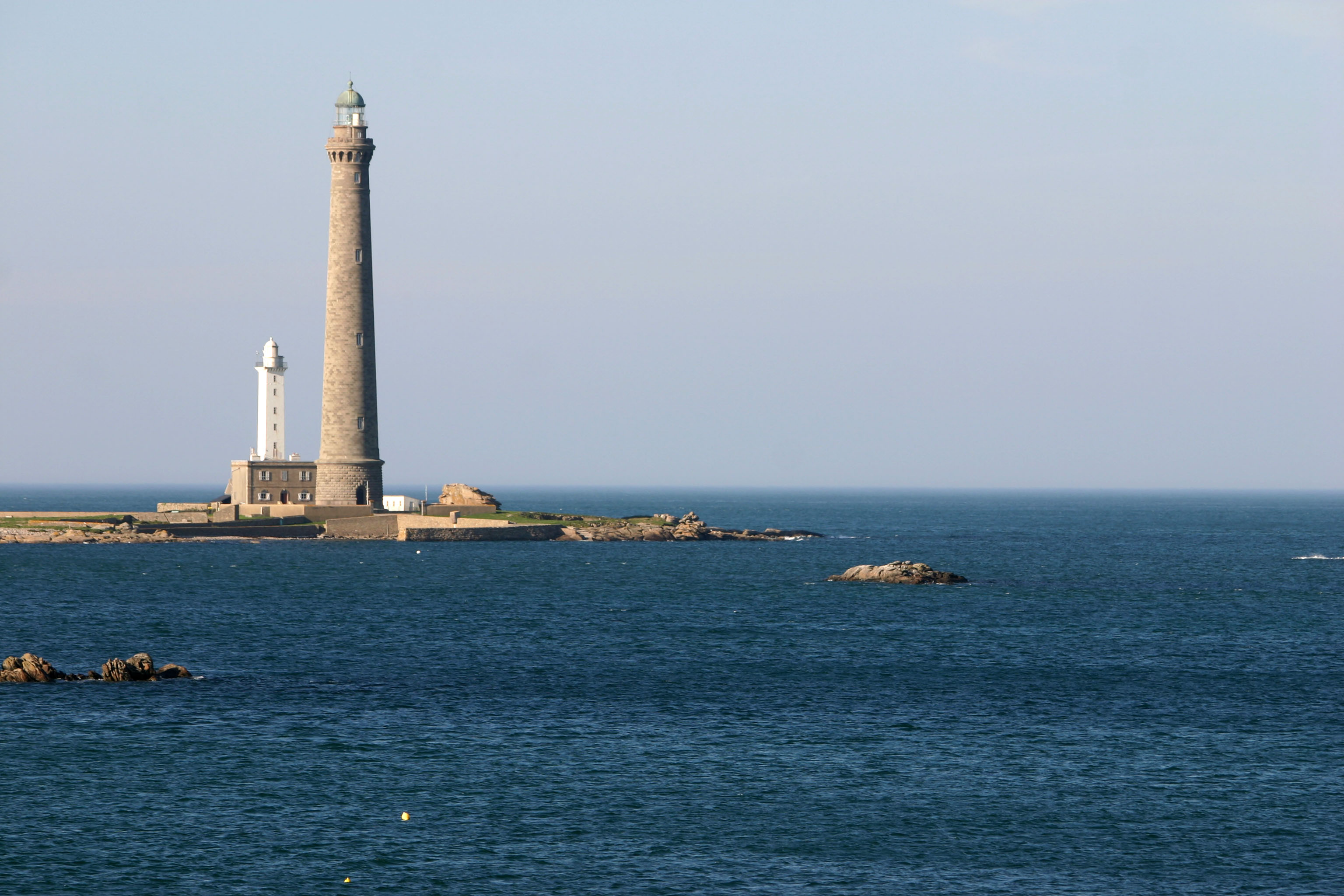
Île Vierge lighthouse

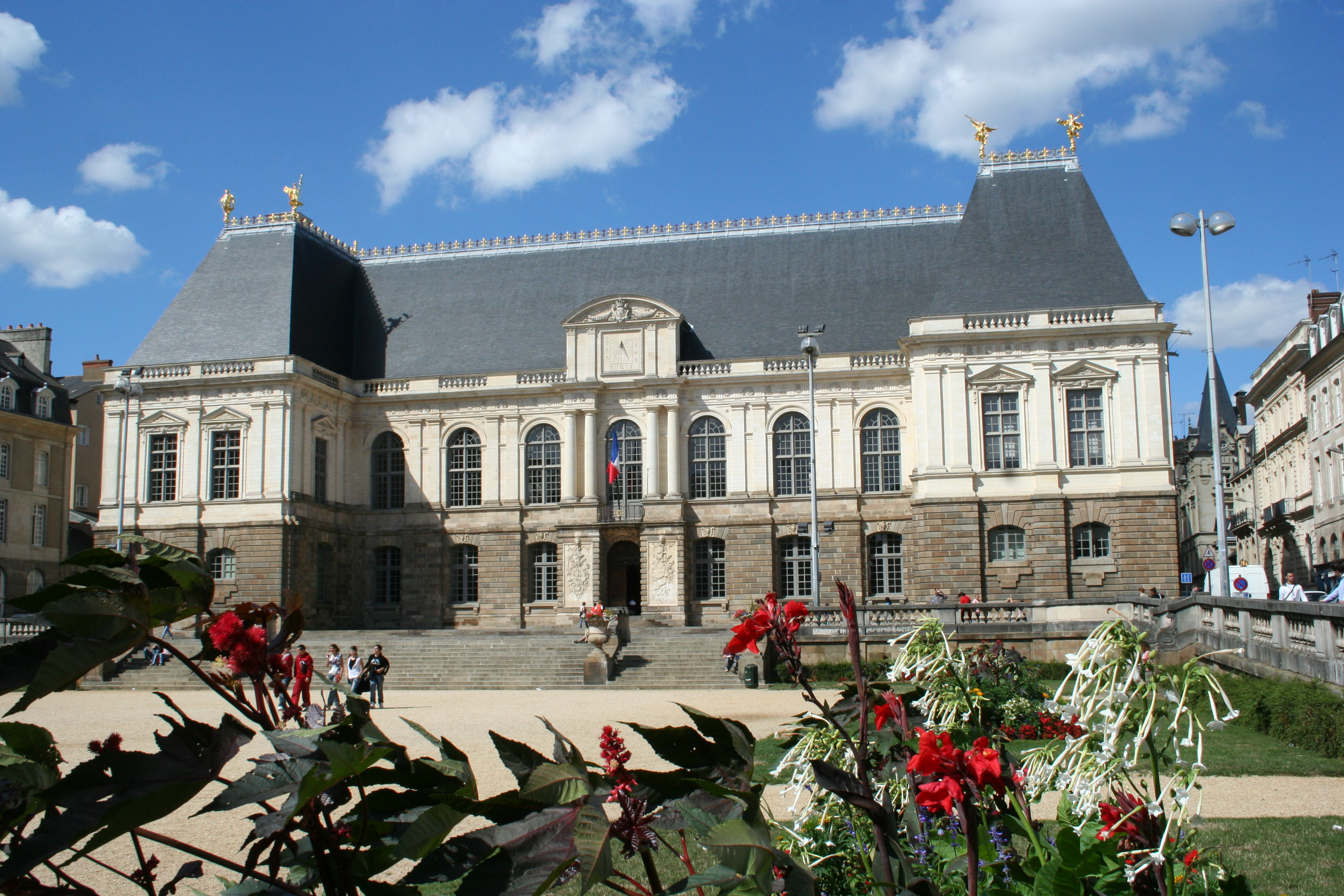
Parlement of Brittany in Rennes

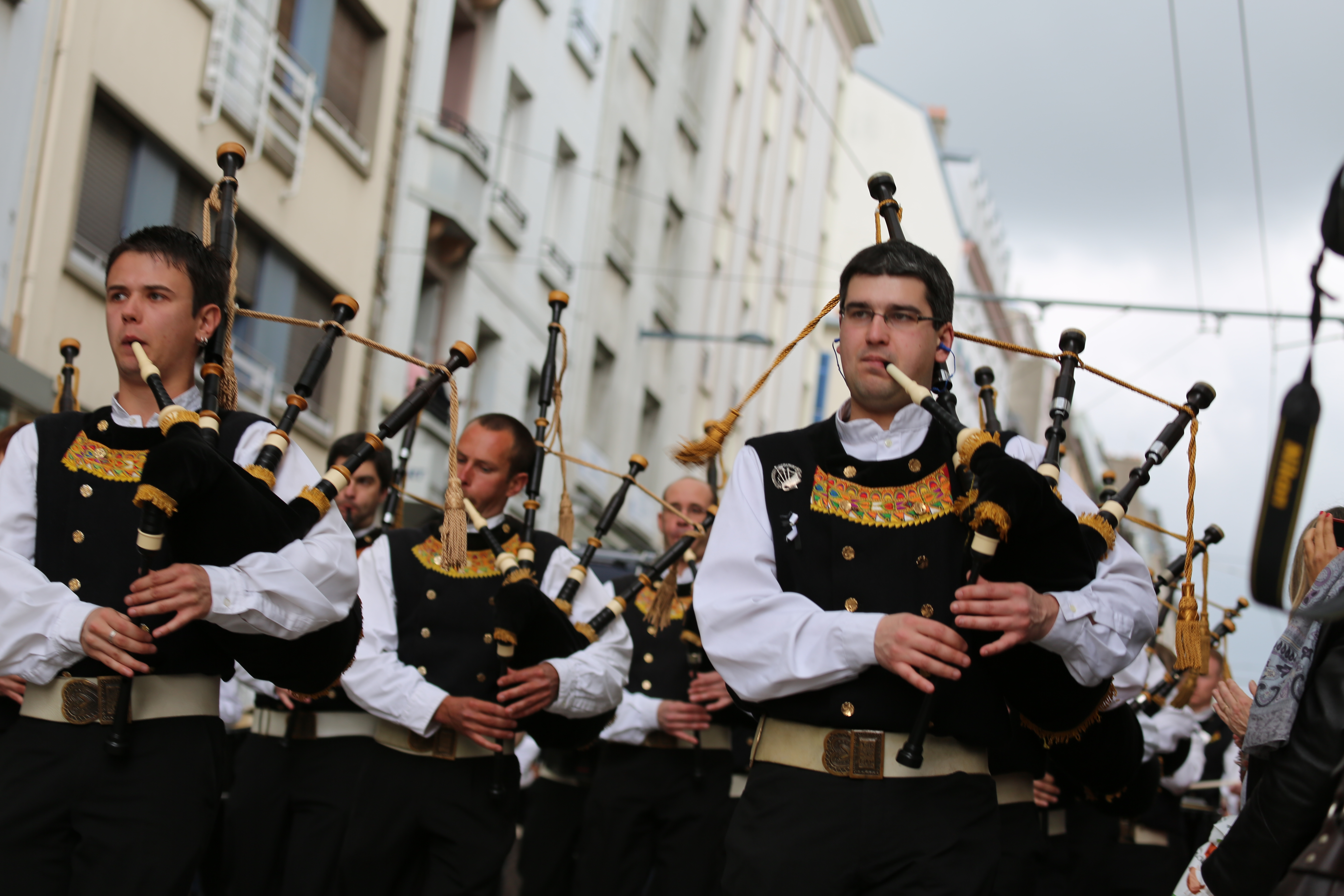
Ar Meilhoù Glaz, a Bagad from Quimper

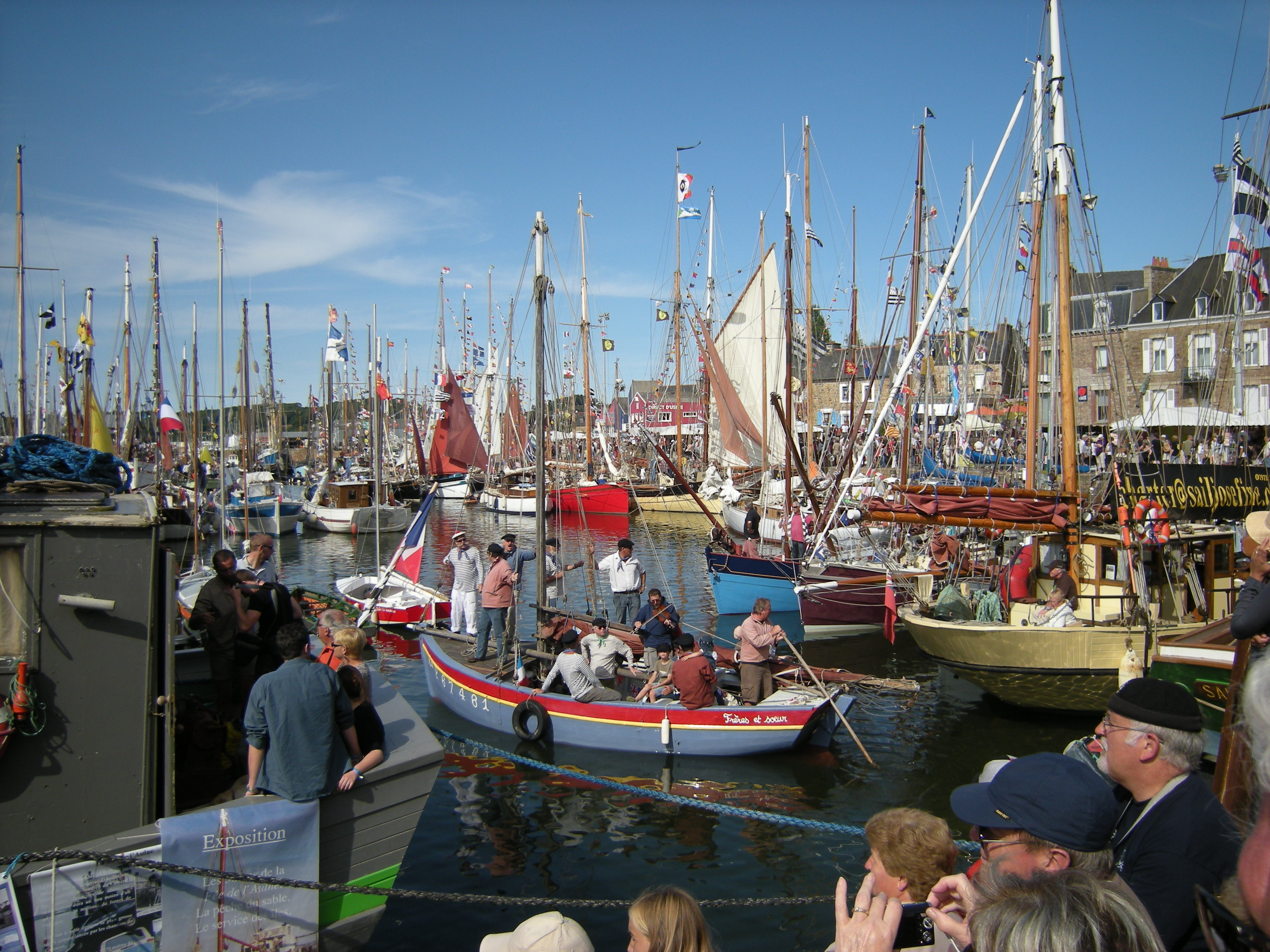
Festival du chant de marin, sea songs festival in Paimpol

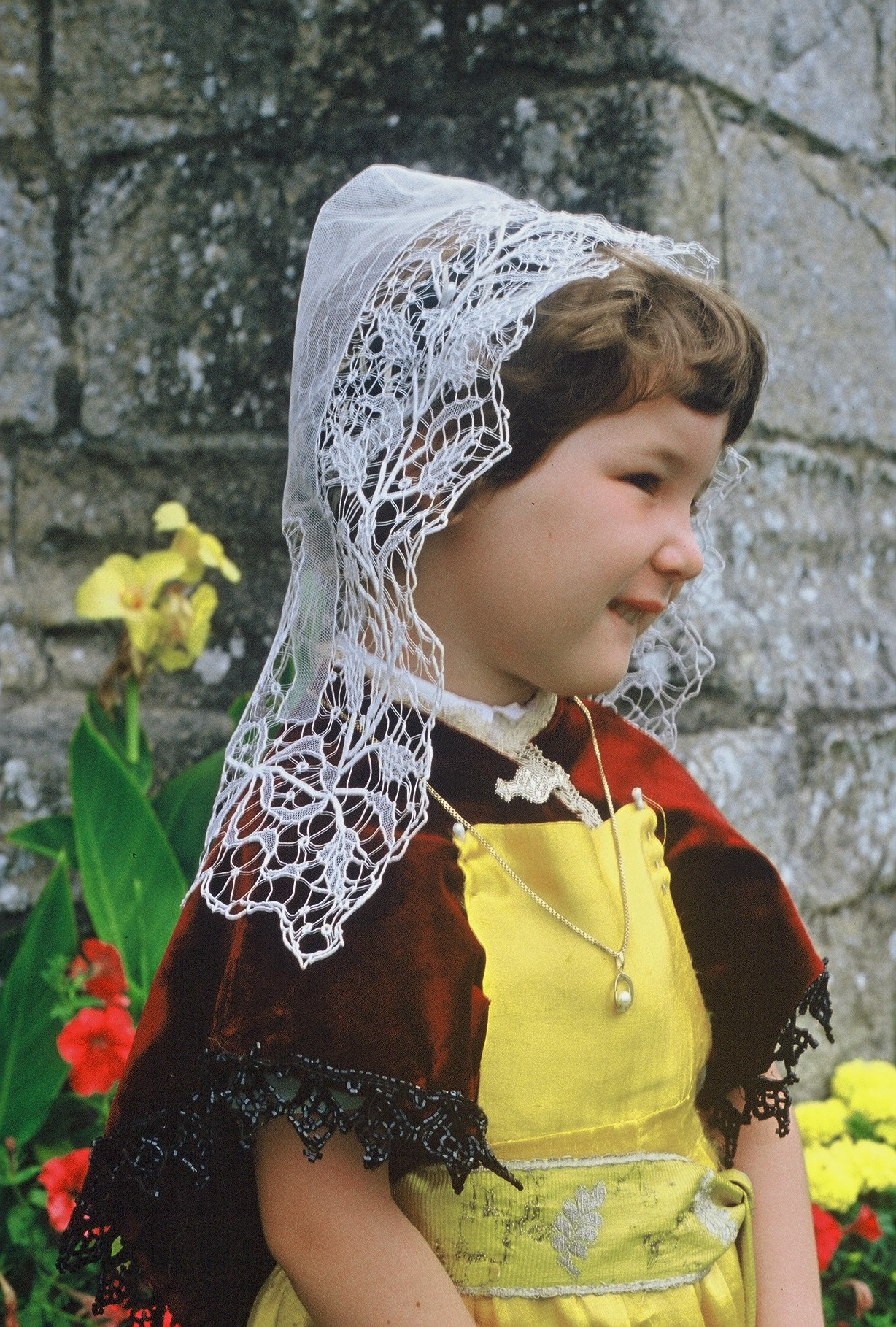
A Breton headdress from Batz-sur-Mer

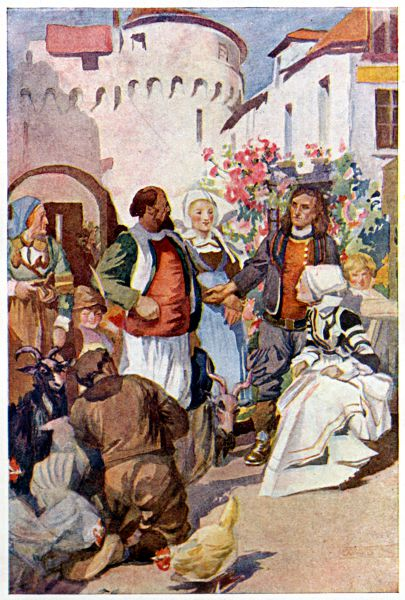
Modern Brittany - Illustration from Legends & Romances of Brittany by Lewis Spence, illustrated by W. Otway Cannell.

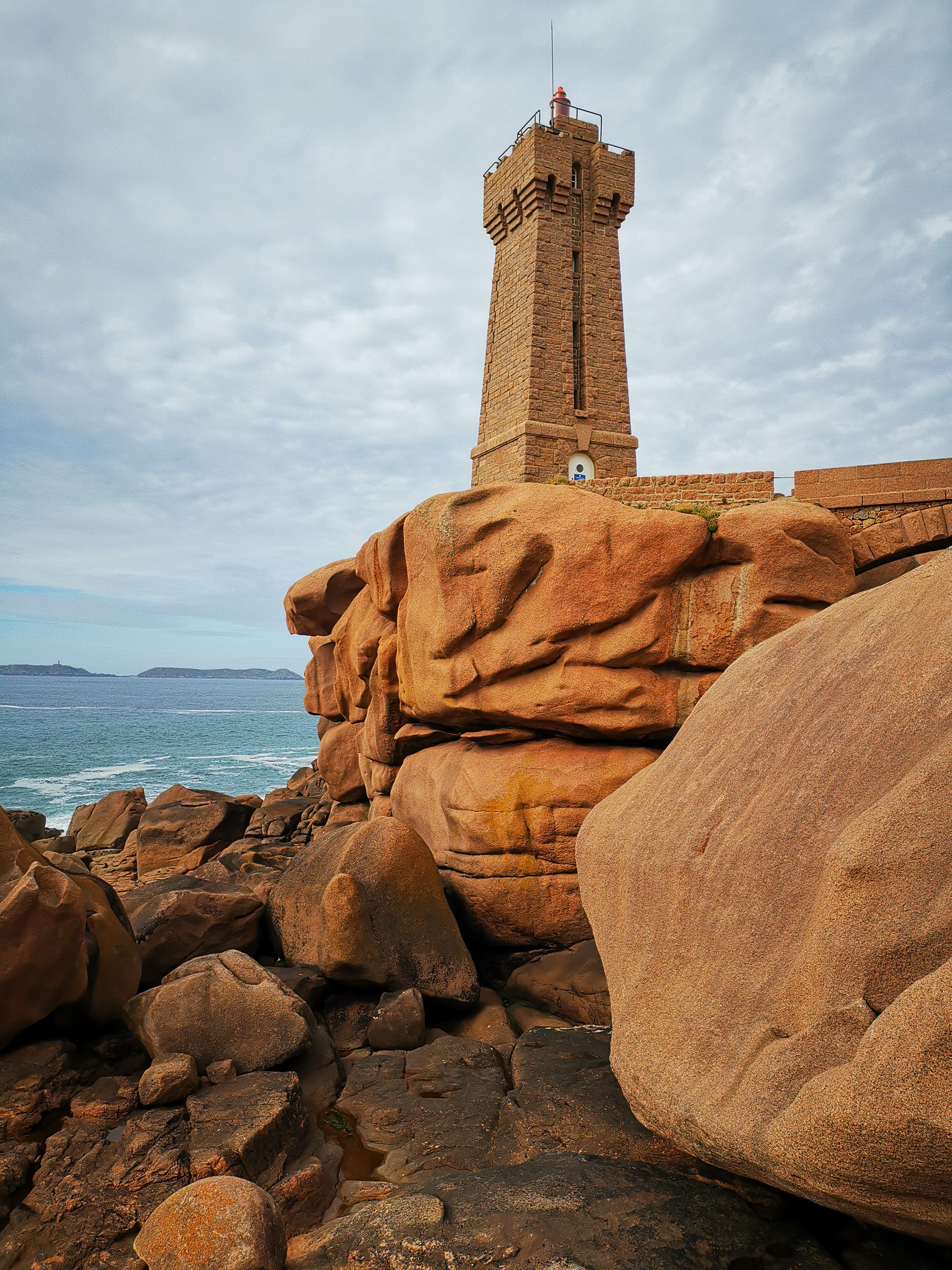
Men Ruz lighthouse, Ploumanac'h

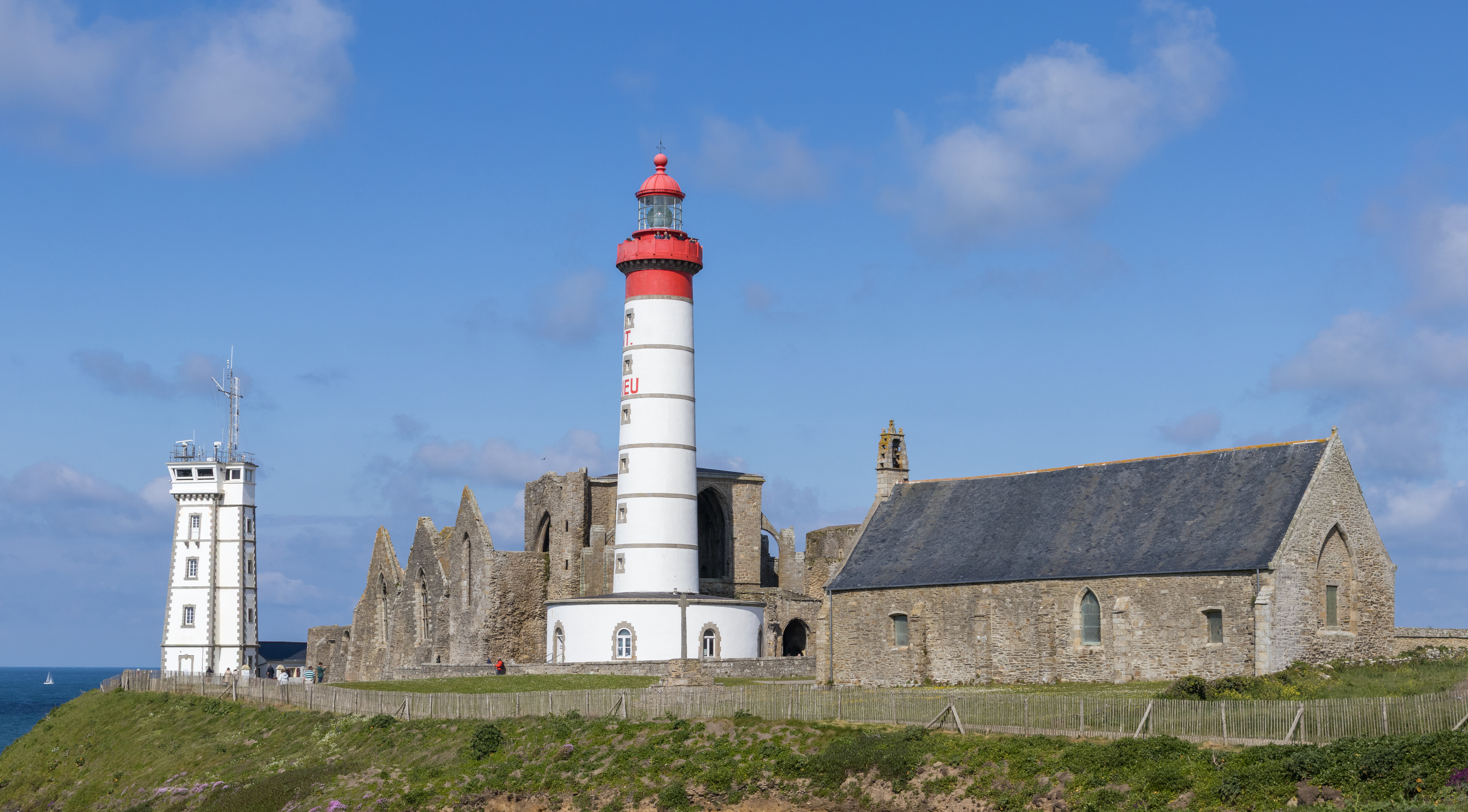
Abbey and lighthouse of Saint-Mathieu

== See also ==
- Brigantes, Breton Celtic tribe associated with Northern England
- Politics of Brittany
- Great Britain in French as Grande-Bretagne
- Le Peuple breton
