= List of Breton poets =

The following is a list of Breton poets. Brittany is a cultural and geographical region in northwest France that is the homeland of the Breton people. Historically part of the Celtic nations, Bretons spoke the Breton language, an extant Celtic language, before becoming a part of France in 1532 and adopting the French language. However, within Brittany there are five dialects of Breton. Historically, Breton's poets were called bards. In the 19th and 20th centuries, many Breton poets were part of a Breton nationalist movement, writing in the Breton language as a way to promote and maintain their cultural identity within France. The Society of Breton Bibliophiles identified more than 200 19th-century Breton poets in 1879. This revival of Breton language and cultural expanded those who had emigrated outside of the area, often as a way to recall and honor their homeland.

Name	Breton or bardic name	Language (use for poetry)	References
Abeozen		Breton	
Erwan Berthou		Breton, French	
Auguste Brizeux		English	
Camille Bryen		English	
Odile Caradec		English	
Danielle Collobert		Breton	
Tristan Corbière		English	
Charles de Gaulle	Charlez Vro-C'hall	Breton	
Regis de l'Estourbeillon		Breton	
Pêr Denez		Breton	
Youenn Drezen		Breton	
Marie de France		Old French	
Vefa de Bellaing		Breton	
Añjela Duval		Breton	
Erwan Evenou		Breton	
René Galand		French	
Maodez Glanndour		Breton	
Glenmor	Milig Ar Skañv	Breton	
Yvon Gourmelon	Yann Gerven	Breton	
Xavier Grall		English	
Gwenc'hlan	Kian	Breton	
Youenn Gwernig		Breton, English	
Max Jacob		English	
Pêr-Jakez Helias	Pierre-Jakez Hélias	Breton	
Roparz Hemon		Breton	
Théodore Claude Henri, vicomte Hersart de la Villemarqué		French	
Loeiz Herrieu		Breton	
Ronan Huon		Breton	
François Jaffrennou		Breton	
Alfred Jarry		English	
Roparz Hemon		Breton	
Tudual Huon		Breton	
Yann-Ber Kalloc'h		Breton	
Koulizh Kedez		Breton	
Paol Keineg		French	
Charles Le Goffic		French	
Pierre Le Bihan		French	
Jean-Marie Le Joubioux		Breton	
Michel Luneau		French	
François-Marie Luzel	Fañch an Uhel	Breton	
Meavenn		Breton	
Jean Meschinot		French	
Gabriel Milin	Laouenan Breiz	Breton	
Erwan ar Moal		Breton, French	
Yann-Ber Piriou		Breton	
Annaig Renault		Breton	
Guy Ropartz		French	
Naïg Rozmor		Breton	
Victor Segalen		French	
Gilles Servat		Breton, French	
Jean Sulivan		French	
Bernez Tangi		Breton	
Claire Trévien		English	

== See also ==
- Breton literature
- Breton nationalism
- Bretons
