= Breton literature =

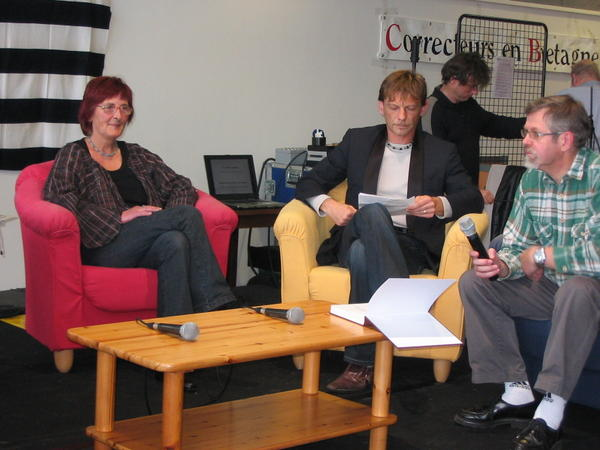
Breton novelists Mich Beyer and Yann-Fulup Dupuy, with translator Hervé Latimier, 2008

Breton literature (Breton: Lennegezh vrezhonek, French: Littérature en breton) may refer to literature in the Breton language (Brezhoneg) or the broader literary tradition of Brittany in the three other main languages of the area, namely, Latin, Gallo and French – all of which have had strong mutual linguistic and cultural influences.

== Old and Middle Breton literature ==
Breton literature can be categorised into an Old Breton period, from the 5th to 11th century; and a Middle Breton period, up to the 17th century. The period break is marked by the Norman invasions of the 10th and 11th centuries which triggered an exodus out of Brittany. Many Old Breton extant words are glosses in Latin manuscripts from the 9th and 10th centuries, now scattered in libraries and collections throughout Europe. It is likely there was a highly developed oral tradition during the Old Breton period. And on the evidence of Breton names, it would appear that Old and Middle Breton literature inspired much of Arthurian literature, the story of Tristan and Iseult and the Lais of Marie de France.

== Leyden Manuscript ==
The oldest surviving manuscript in the Breton language (dating to the end of the 8th century) is kept at Leyden University, Netherlands, and predates the oldest text referenced in French by more than a century. It is generally assumed by specialists that this is the most ancient text in a continental Brythonic language and was studied by the late Professor Léon Fleuriot (1923–1987). The manuscript itself is a fragment of medicinal recipes composed of plants suggesting that Breton may well have been used by people of learning at the turn of the 11th century.

== The Breton Gospel ==
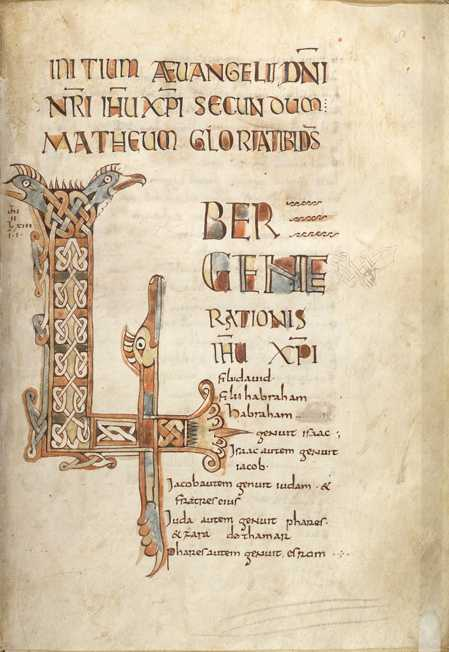
Breton Gospel Book: Folio 8 rect, the incipit page to the Gospel of Matthew

Although written in Latin the Breton Gospel (British Library, Egerton 609) is an important literary work in terms of the wider scope of Breton culture. Amongst other things it attests to a high degree of learning and, presumably, monasterial wealth in Brittany comparable to that of Lindisfarne and Kells. The Gospel Book manuscript dating from the 9th century contains the Latin text of the four Gospels, along with prefatory material and canon tables – an interesting admixture of traditions. The Breton Gospel is similar to the form of Carolingian minuscule developed at Tours – one of the classicising centres of the Carolingian Renaissance, and although the form of the large illuminated letters that form the beginning of each Gospel are comparable to those found in Carolingian manuscripts, the decoration thereof is far more similar to Celtic Church manuscripts such as the Book of Kells and the Lindisfarne Gospels, suggesting a continuum of cultural tradition. However, the decoration here is simpler and more geometric in form than that to be found in insular manuscripts. The beginning of each Gospel is preceded by a full miniature of the appropriate Evangelist's symbol and the vellum folios themselves measure 32.5 by 23 centimetres.

== Glosses ==
Another early known piece of Breton literature is found in the margins of a 14th-century Latin manuscript, scribbled by a scribe weary of his toil and mind on more immediate concerns, he left for posterity a four line love poem, the first two lines beginning:

An guen heguen am louenas
An hegarat an lacat glas

The fair one, her cheek gladdened me
The lovable one of the blue eye.

== Epic poetry ==
The main principle of Breton poetry is that the next to last syllable in a line should rhyme with one or more other syllables in the same line. For example, in the first line above, "en" is the second to last syllable, which rhymes with "guen" and "heguen". In the second line, "at" is the second to last syllable which rhymes with "hegarat".

There are several texts from the 15th and 16th century:

- Destruction of Jerusalem, fragments.
- Life of Saint Guénolé, fragments.
- Dialogue Between Arthur and Guynglaff, a very badly damaged 247-line poem passed down through multiple generations of copies.
- Life of Saint Nonn and Her Son Devy
- Buhez Sante Barba ("The Life of Saint Barbara"), a mystery play on the life and miracles of Saint Barbara.

== Modern literature ==
Before the literary revival movement promoted by Gwalarn in the early 20th century, most literature in Breton consisted of religious writings.

Prose writings in Breton, almost exclusively religious, started appearing from the 17th century. The second half of the 18th century saw the appearance of the first secular works in Breton: Ar Farvel Goapaer by François-Nicolas de Pascal de Kerenveyer and Sarmoun great war ar maro a Vikael Vorin by Claude-Marie Le Laë. Most literature remained oral, however.

Yann-Frañsez ar Gonideg (1775–1838) played an important role by initiating a reform of Breton orthography, producing an orderly grammar and making the first Modern Breton translation of the New Testament.

=== 19th century ===
The 19th century witnessed "a veritable explosion" of published works of Breton literature, particularly after ties between the Breton people and the Catholic clergy were restored following the religious persecution of the French First Republic.

Increasingly, antiquarians and Celtic revivalists undertook the collection of folk texts, songs and stories. The wave of interest in collecting oral traditions reached Brittany around 1815-1820 when educated members of the nobility such as Aymar de Blois de La Calande, Barbe-Émilie de Saint-Prix, Jean-Marie de Penguern, Jean-François de Kergariou, Ursule Feydeau de Vaugien, exchanged their findings informally. Writers such as Anatole Le Braz and Théodore Hersart de la Villemarqué (son of Ursule Feydeau de Vaugien) brought new readers to traditional Breton literature.

Barzaz Breizh (literally "The Bards of Brittany") is a collection of Breton oral poetry collected by La Villemarqué and published in 1839 (revised and expanded edition 1845). It was compiled from the oral tradition and preserves Breton mythology, legends, and music. Although hugely influential, Barzaz Breiz came under attack from a later generation of collectors, who accused La Villemarqué, like James Macpherson and the Brothers Grimm, of collecting songs and stories and then editing them before publication to accord with contemporary literary taste. Taking a more rigorous approach to the collection of oral material, François-Marie Luzel published Gwerziou Breiz Izel (1868–1874) and Contes Bretons (1870). Despite their differences, both La Villemarqué and Luzel inspired many others to collect and publish other works of oral poetry and to also write and publish a flood of new poetry in the Breton language.

Auguste Brizeux used Le Gonidec's standardised Breton for Telenn Arvor (1844), and his collection of proverbs, Furnez Breiz (1845).

In 1877, Lan Inisan published Emgann Kergidou ("The Battle of Kergidou"), the first and only novel in Breton to be published before the First World War. The novel is set during the 1793 Chouannerie in Saint-Pol-de-Léon; an uprising by Breton nobles and commons against the French Revolutionary Army and the French First Republic.

=== 20th–21st centuries ===
Troiou kamm Alanig al Louarn, book 1, by Jakez Riou, 1936.

Even though the neo-bardic, Gorsedd, and Eisteddfod movement in Brittany was founded during the early 19th century by Auguste Brizeux, the real heyday of the movement took place between 1900 and the outbreak of the First World War. Those two decades were dominated by François Jaffrenou, whose bardic name was Taldir, and who introduced many Iolo Morganwg-inspired elements of Welsh culture into Breton culture. During those decades, Taldir founded the Gorsedd Barzed Gourenez Breiz Isel (The Gorsedd of Bards of the Peninsula of Brittany) and did much to encourage both traditional Celtic poetry and a sense of community among Breton Bards.

The poet Jean-Pierre Calloc'h (1888–1917) was killed during the First World War. His posthumously published collection Ar en deulin established his reputation as a war poet.

According to Jelle Krol, "It is not merely a collection of poems by a major Breton poet: it is a symbol of homage to Yann-Ber Kalloc'h and all those Bretons whose creative powers were cut short by their untimely deaths. Breton literature from the trenches is very rare. Only Yann-Ber Kalloc'h's poems, some war notes written by Auguste Bocher, the memoirs recounted by Ambroise Harel and Loeiz Herrieu's letters addressed to his wife survived the war."

In the 1920s, a movement, in which the linguist and author Roparz Hemon played an important part, arose to introduce both literary modernism and world literature into the Breton language. The literary magazine Gwalarn provided an outlet for literary modernism, such as Jakez Riou and Yves Le Drézen (who published the first long novel in Breton in 1941). The artistic movement Seiz Breur included writers.

The literary magazine Al Liamm published its first issue in 1946. Numerous authors of modern Breton literature, such as Abeozen, Per Denez, Youenn Drezen, Xavier de Langlais (Langleiz), Añjela Duval, Reun Ar C'halan, Maodez Glanndour, Youenn Gwernig, Roparz Hemon, Ronan Huon, Paol Keineg, Kerverzioù, Meavenn, Youenn Olier, Yann-Ber Piriou ... have made contributions to the magazine with poems, short stories, essays, studies, ... Breton poets and singers who were directly involved in the revival of the music of Brittany, such as Milig ar Skañv (Glenmor), Youenn Gwernig, or Bernez Tangi, have also published poems and songs in Al Liamm.

Pierre-Jakez Hélias (1914–1995) wrote stage plays, literary adaptations of tales from Breton mythology, prose, nonfiction, and poetry in both Breton, which he often self-translated into French in order to reach a wider audience. In 1948, he was the co-founder, with François Bégot and Jo Halleguen, of Les grandes Fêtes de Cornouaille Breton: Cornouaille Kemper) in Quimper, which he helped adapt from an annual beauty contest into a Welsh Eisteddfod-inspired summer festival celebrating Breton culture, literature, and music which still continues.

Helias' contemporary Añjela Duval (1905–1981) wrote poetry reflective of her peasant origins, mysticism, and social conscience.

In contrast to the concentration on short-form writings in Breton which had dominated production in the previous century, a trend towards novel-length writing developed from the 1980s. By the beginning of the 21st century a dozen or so novels on average were being published in Breton every year. The choice of genres was diverse, including detective fiction, historical fiction, and autobiographies. With incentives from educational contexts, contests and literary prizes, there has been a development of young adult fiction, often using fantasy and science fiction themes. Yann-Fañch Jacq is a notable author of such fiction aimed at young Breton-speaking readers. New more adult themes have appeared as the novel genre has developed: for example, Yann Fulub Dupuy's Par Dibar (2006) deals with sexuality. Finally special mention should be made of the poet and singer Denez Prigent, whose creative career and international success (a rarity in contemporary France, as opposed to the epoch of Jacques Brel) testifies to the appeal of Breton artists.

Prizioù is an annual (since 1997) award for expressions of Breton culture in seven categories, of which fiction is one. Prix Xavier de Langlais (named after Xavier de Langlais) is an annual (since 1976) prize for best unpublished prose work or poetry collection.

== In popular culture ==
- In 1865 a literary translation of Barzaz Breiz into English by Tom Taylor was published under the title Ballads and Songs of Brittany. The same book has also been translated into German, Italian, and Polish.
- The 1888 opera Le roi d'Ys ("The King of Ys"), by French composer Édouard Lalo and based upon a libretto by Édouard Blau, is based on the legend in Barzaz Breiz of the drowned city of Ys in the kingdom of Cornouaille. The same story also inspired Claude Debussy's 1910 La cathédrale engloutie in his first book of Preludes.
- The Lay of Aotrou and Itroun a 1930 poem of 508 lines by J. R. R. Tolkien, is based on the Breton lay An Aotrou Nann hag ar Gorigann ("Lord Nann and the Korrigan"). The poem was first published in Welsh Review in December 1945 and then republished posthumously in an edition by Verlyn Flieger in 2016.
- Pierre-Jacques Hélias' memoir Marh ar lorh ("The Horse of Pride") was adapted for the big screen by Claude Chabrol in 1980.
- In her 2009 album Uam, Scottish traditional musician Julie Fowlis recorded Breton World War I war poet Yann-Ber Kalloc'h's most famous song, Me 'zo Ganet kreiz ar e mor ("I was Born in the Middle of the Sea"). The lyrics were first translated from the original Breton language into Fowlis' native Scottish Gaelic.

== See also ==
- Cornish literature
- Literature in the other languages of Britain
- List of Breton poets
- Welsh literature
