= Héritage des Celtes (album) =

Studio album by Dan Ar Braz and The Héritage des Celtes
- Released: 1994
- Recorded: April – June 1994
- Genre: Folk/Rock
- Label: Columbia France
- Producer: Dónal Lunny

Héritage des Celtes is a folk-rock album by Dan Ar Braz and Héritage des Celtes musicians, released in 1994 by Columbia France (Sony Music distribution), catalogue number COL 477763 2.

The album was produced by ex-Bothy Band and Moving Hearts leader Dónal Lunny. It was recorded at Windmill Lane Studios, Dublin by Brian Masterson and Alastair McMillan, and mixed by Brian Masterson and Rob Kirwan. The singers are Elaine Morgan from Rose Among Thorns and Karen Matheson of Capercaillie fame.

A live version of this material as played by Ar Braz and a large ensemble (recorded in Rennes the following year) appears on the album Et les 50 musiciens de l'Héritage des Celtes, En concert.

== Track listing ==
1. "Borders of Salt" (Traditional; arranged by Ar Braz)
2. "Spike Island Lasses" (Traditional; arranged by Nollaig Casey and Dónal Lunny)
3. "Language of the Gaels" (Murdo Macfarlane)
4. "Green Lands" (Ar Braz)
5. "Maro Eo Ma Mestrez" (Traditional; arranged by Ar Braz)
6. "April The 3rd" (Dónal Lunny)
7. "Eliziza" (Traditional; arranged by Ar Braz)
8. "King of Laois" (Traditional; arranged by Ar Braz)
9. "The Island" (Paul Brady)
10. "Scottish Suite" (Ar Braz)
11. "Me Zo Ganet E Kreiz Ar Mor" (Yann Ber Calloc'h, Jef Le Penven)
12. "Call to The Dance" (Ar Braz)

== Personnel ==
- Dan Ar Braz
- Dónal Lunny - bouzouki, vocals, bodhran
- Noel Bridgeman - percussion
- Ronan Browne - uilleann pipes, flute, low whistle, tin whistle
- Nollaig Casey - violin
- Ray Fean - drums
- Jean-Louis Henaff - bombard
- Olivier Lecuyer - bombard
- Patrig Molard - bagpipes
- Eoghan O'Neill - bass
- Jacques Pellen - acoustic guitar
- Erwan Ropars - bagpipes
- Donald Shaw - keyboards, vocals
- Jean-Michel Veillon - flute
- Karen Matheson - vocals
- Elaine Morgan - vocals
- Yann Fanch Kemener - vocals
- Gilles Servat - vocals

with

- Bagad Kemper (pipe band)
- Shotts Pipe Band
