= Andrea Ar Gouilh =

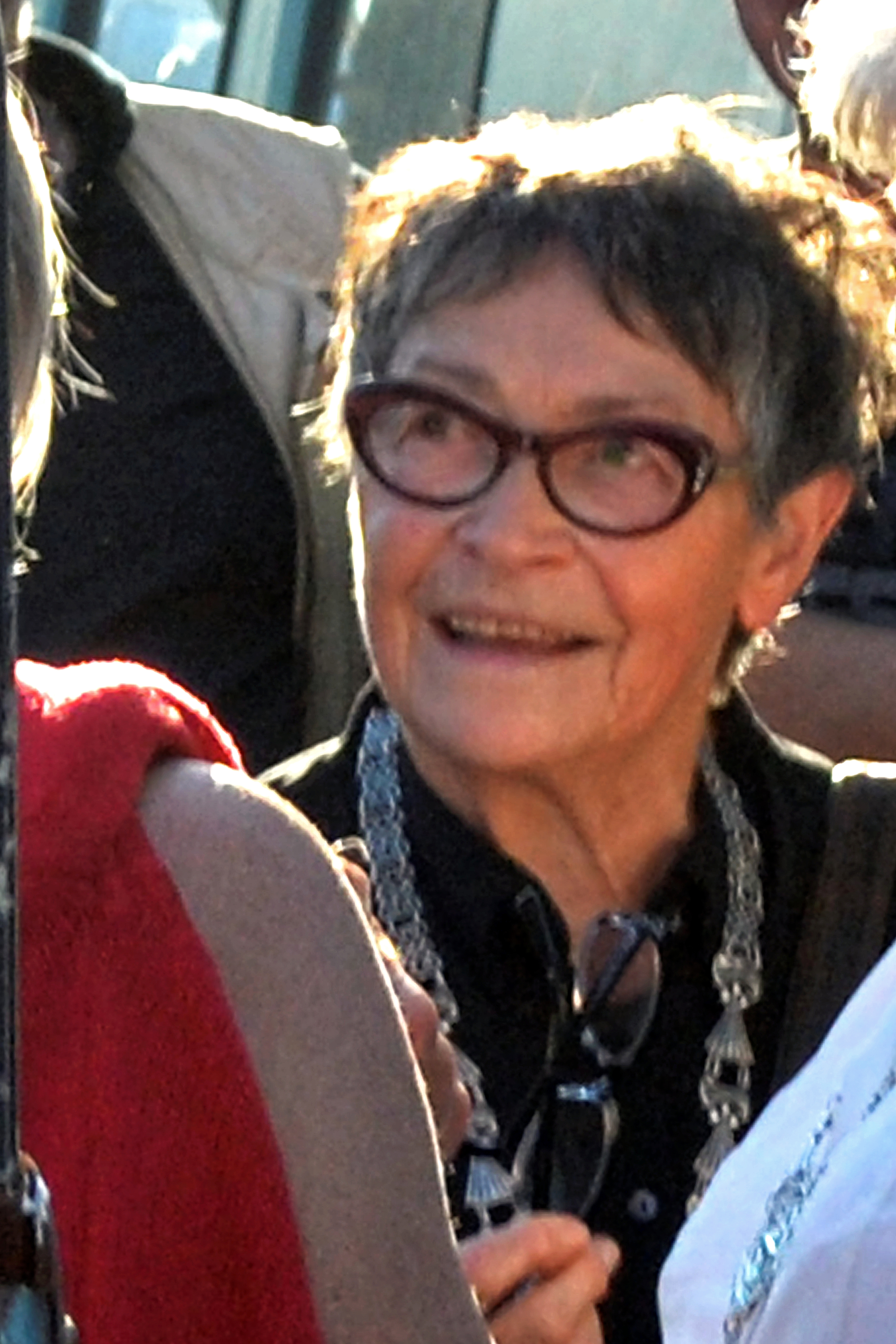
- Ar Gouilh at the demonstration for the attachment of the Loire-Atlantique to Brittany in Nantes on 27 September 2014.

Background information
- Born: Andrée Le Gouil; 13 July 1935 (age 90); Pluguffan, Finistère, France
- Genres: Breton chanson
- Occupation: Singer
- Instrument: Vocals
- Years active: 1950s–present
- Labels: Mouez Breiz, Arfolk, Coop Breizh

Andrée Le Gouil (born 13 July 1935), known by her stage name Andrea Ar Gouilh, is a French singer.

A pioneer in the revival of Breton chanson, she performs songs from Barzaz Breiz, a collection of popular Breton songs, but also more recent compositions by Glenmor and Jef Le Penven for example. She had a decisive influence on the career of Alan Stivell and that of her own daughter, Nolwenn Korbell. Ar Gouilh found in song the means to express the dignity of a culture, a memory and a Breton way of being which influences the vision of the world.

== Biography ==
=== Early life ===
Ar Gouilh was born in Pluguffan on 13 July 1935. Her father, from a line of fishermen from Poulgoazec, a teacher for a time, was a gendarme. Her mother, born in Pluguffan in 1909, sang and her grandmother Marijan Arzul, a dressmaker who runs a village hall, is known to sing all the time, as is her uncle Bili, singer and bugle player. Living in Glazik country, she therefore sang from her childhood and even more as a teenager, both at home and at church and on every occasion such as pardons, weddings, etc. Youth in song, in a large family of seven children, of which Andrea was the eldest. The family lived in Falaise in Normandy where the father was transferred, then to Lambézellec in 1939. Following the bombardment of the Hotel Continental in 1941, the family left Brest to return to Pluguffan. The father then left the gendarmerie and became a sales representative. In the rural parish, Breton remains the language of catechism and hymns. Very early on, Ar Gouilh actively participated in the life of the parish, learned the harmonium with the parish priest and played for years during religious ceremonies. Then, she becomes almost naturally militant of the Catholic agricultural youth (JAC) and followed many courses there; She led a group of Scottish and Russian dances there, learned and perfected singing, discovered Gregorian chants and cinema.

=== The affirmation of an identity ===
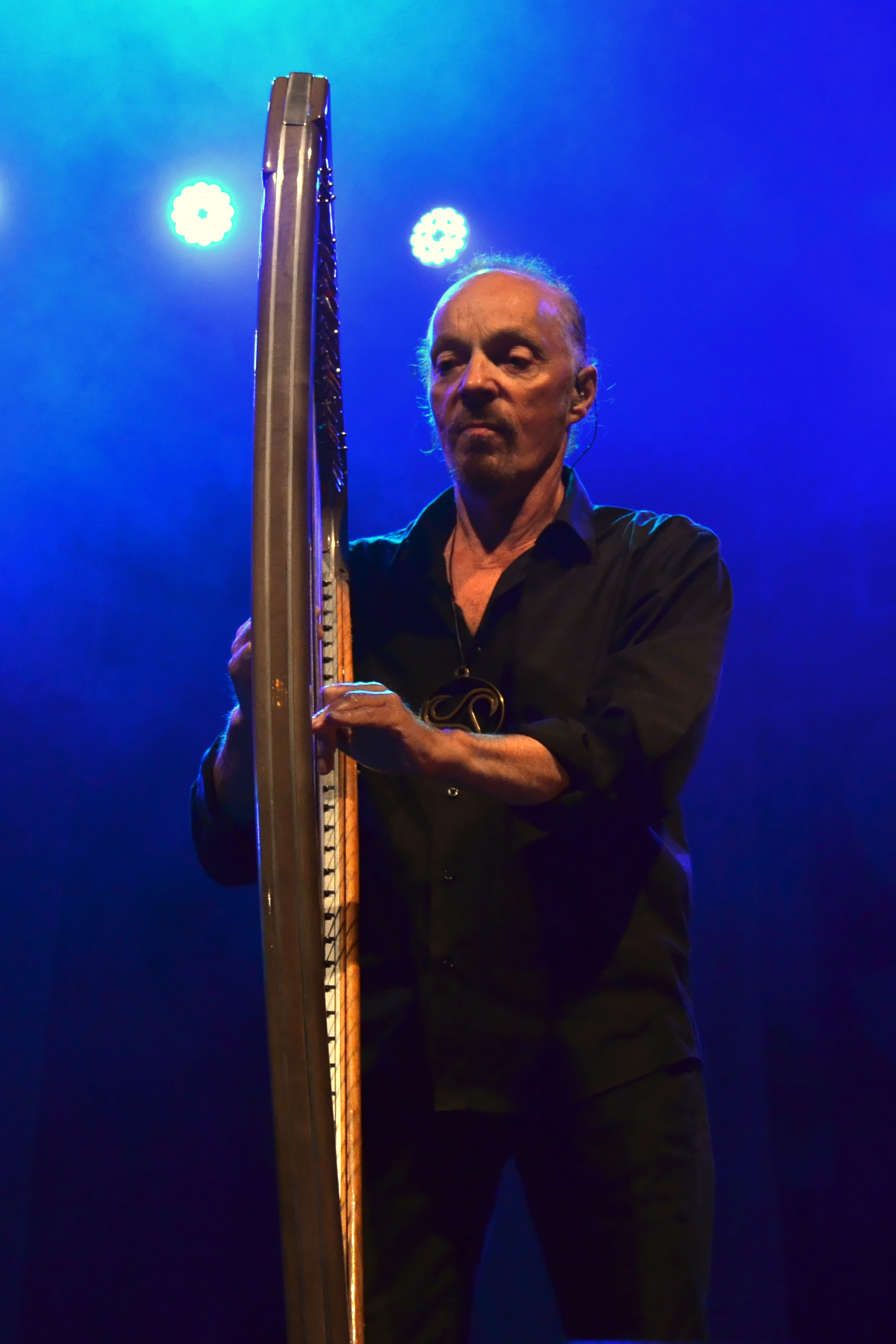
Ar Goulih recorded several discs accompanied by the Celtic harp of Alan Stivell.

In 1956, after registering for the "Bleun-Brug" holiday song contest in Combrit, Ar Goulih won first prize, which she repeated three times in a row, in 1957, in Locronan and Pont-l'Abbé in 1958. These dynamic festivals are for Ar Gouilh the opportunity to follow training in Breton culture and to discover dances, costumes and personalities from other regions. Because of her too great modesty, she did not dare to become a professional singer. In 1958, received at the kindergarten school, she left for Paris for two years of study, in order to then take care of young children, in nursery schools in particular.

This period was very useful for Ar Gouilh thanks to the contacts that it generated; she became part of the Breton networks, Kêr Vreiz, J.E.B. (Jeunesse Étudiante Bretonne) and the Celtic circle "Jabadao". She discovered Barzaz Breiz and traditional songs from the Vannes region thanks to people like Donatien Laurent, Gwennole Le Menn. Ar Gouilh, who sang at the wedding of the president of the JEB, Jean-Jacques Kerdiles, met Georges Cochevelou, Alan Stivell's father, who asks her to sing accompanied by his son on the Celtic harp he built. With the Mouez Breiz label, the first Breton record company, she recorded four 45s in Hermann Wolf's dining room. The first disc appeared in 1959, always with texts by Barzaz Breiz that Jord (Georges Cochevelou) introduced to her. A fifth 45 rpm appear in 1960, albeit with the accompaniment of Gérard Pondaven, organist of the cathedral of Quimper. Unforgettable emotion for her, when in a camp in Ar Falz in 1959, she sang, with Alan Cochevelou, in front of René-Yves Creston who wept with emotion.

=== Actions taken ===
In the service of children, according to the methods initiated by Maria Montessori, Ar Gouilh worked in Clermont-Ferrand in 1960, before returning definitively to Brittany in 1962, at the psychiatric hospital of Quimper where she trained in the relationship with mentally struggling children. In 1965, she left the Gourmelen hospital to help open a medico-pedagogical institute in Douarnenez before participating in the creation of the Kan Ar Mor association, which would allow the opening of many establishments. She worked part-time from 1973 in Brest, in the CMPP created by Claude Chassagny, with whom she worked. This adventure lasted for Ar Gouilh until the time of retirement in 1995.

But her return to the country in 1962 also allowed her to become strongly involved in cultural life, through the festoù-noz relaunched by Loeiz Roparz, as she participated in many camps he organized, open to all. During a Breton camp organized in Elliant in 1962, Ar Gouilh discovered that couples, young and fully integrated into the life of the city, spoke Breton to their children, such as the Denez, Louarn or Kervella families, and decided to when the time comes, to do the same. Per Denez, who became a friend, opened the doors of the interceltic congresses to him. Thus, she found herself in 1962 at the Celtic Congress of Tréguier in the company of Stivell on the harp and Glenmor on the guitar. In 1964, Ar Goillh married Hervé Corbel, a bell ringer from Trégor-Goëlo. The couple moved to Douarnenez and two children were born, Nolwenn in 1968 and Riwal in 1972; both were students in Breton and became artists. At the end of the 1960s, Ar Gouilh took an active part in the event show “Breiz Gwechall”, organized by Bernard de Parades, who in 1969, 70 and 71, presented in many cities (including the Festival de Cornouaille), an important audiovisual montage on Brittany, accompanied by songs by Andrea Ar Gouilh and dances. From her activist years, she has retained the authenticity and demand for a choice of life by perpetuating the dignity of Breton culture, with simplicity and modesty.

=== A meeting of cultures ===
Since 1962, Ar Gouilh has sung in Brittany and abroad. She sang in Japan in 1976, but also especially in Celtic countries such as Ireland (Celtavision competition in Killarney in 1972 where she obtained the second prize), Wales, Scotland, in Celtic congresses, as well as in Switzerland, Germany, Austria, and the Czech Republic.

Years of concerts and tours, of encounters too, with artists Xavier Grall, Jean Mingam or Pierre Toulhoat. Years of fighting finally, for Brittany of course, but also for simple and universal ideas, with commitments which find source in the work of libertarians and free spirits like Émile Masson or Glenmor. In 2007, she honored an invitation to Kyzyl, capital of the Tuva, in central Siberia, following her profound meeting in 1987 with Maksim Mounzouk, actor of the film Dersou Ouzala, during the Douarnenez film festival. The Tuvan and Breton languages then intertwine for alliance songs during an evening at her house, recorded on cassette. Although Maxim Munzuk died in 1999, his daughters decide to pay tribute to the one who introduced him to a Brittany that amazed him so much. Ar Gouilh had the privilege of a surprising musical encounter, when there she sang Genovefa Rustefan, a song by Barzaz Breiz, accompanied by musicians from the national orchestra of the Republic of Tuva. She made the trip for the second time in 2012 on the occasion of the centenary of Munzuk.

=== Transmission and recognition ===
Famous for her interpretations of songs from Barzaz Breiz (songs about the human that reach the timeless, "a fountain of youth for today's Brittany" according to her) or songs collected by François-Marie Luzel or Loeiz Herrieu, Ar Gouilh draws from also in the sacred musical heritage and more recent works written by Roparz Hemon, Abeozen, Pierre-Jakez Hélias, to music by Jef Le Penven or Polig Montjarret. She also performed alongside Glenmor and Youenn Gwernig.

Two 33 rpm records were recorded: Gwerziou ha soniou ar bobl in 1977, with Arfolk, with René Richard, then in 1989 with Amadeus, Barzaz Breiz, for the 150th anniversary of the work, with the Quefféléant brothers, from the Triskells. In 1990, her record was awarded the Grand Prix of the Académie Charles Cros.

In 1997, Ar Gouilh sang O Keltia and E dibenn miz gwengolo for a tribute paid to Glenmor one year after his death, which resulted in a Da enoriñ collective in 2000. Also in 1997, two CDs were released: Prins ar c'hornog chez Amadeus, in homage to Jef Le Penven, with Michel Boédec on the organ, and Chants de Bretagne, hymns set to music by Jean Langlais where Ar Gouilh was accompanied by the renowned organist Jacques Kauffmann.

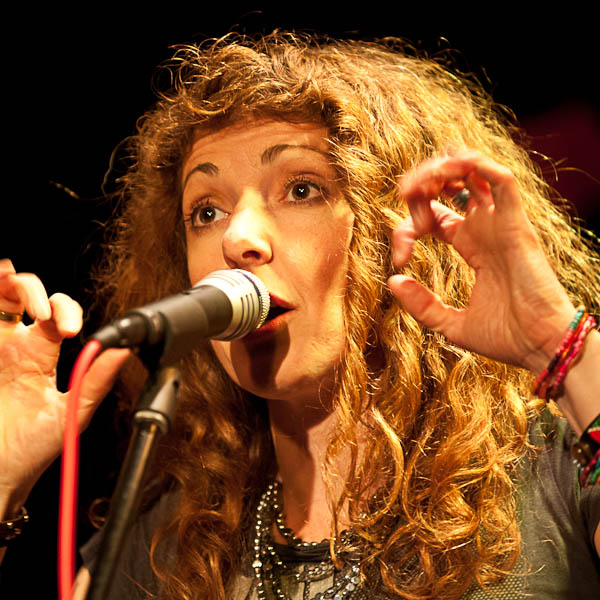
Nolwenn Korbell

Her daughter Nolwenn Korbell, singer of Breton expression, continues the line and has found her audience since her first album in 2003. In 2007, Ar Gouilh "received a moving welcome and rich in cultural exchanges" at Kyzyl in Siberia. In 2008, she recorded a synthesis of a lifetime's work during a recital in Quimper Cathedral, with Michel Boédec on organ and piano, Pol and Hervé Quefféleant on harps and Xavier Lecomte on violin. This album entitled Voix de Bretagne, released by Label Production by Jakez Bernard, contains 8 songs from the Vannes region, 3 from the former bishopric of Tréguier and 2 from that of Quimper, as well as 4 more recent compositions (Glenmor, Hélias, Gwernig). In 2009, Ar Gouilh won the “Coup de cœur” prize at the Great Price of the record Produced in Brittany.

On 23 July 2011 during the Cornouaille festival in Quimper, Ar Gouilh, who resides in Douarnenez received the collar of the Order of the Hermine by the Cultural Institute of Brittany. Since 2011, she has participated in the tribute show Glenmor l'Insoumis/Disuj, performed in Lesneven, Rennes, at the theater in Vannes and at the Palais des Congrès in Pontivy as well as in festivals (interceltique de Lorient, Cornouaille 2013).

== Discography ==
=== Albums ===
- 1977 : Gwerziou ha soniou ar bobl - Chants traditionnels de Bretagne (ArFolk - Coop Breizh)
- 1990 : Barzaz-Breiz - Kanet evit Breizh yaouank (Escalibur - Coop Breizh)
- 1997 : Chants de Bretagne (Skarbo, Studio SM)
- 1997 : Prins ar c'hornog aour (Globe Sony, Déclic)
- 2008 : Voix de Bretagne (Label Production, Coop Breizh)

=== 45 rpm ===
- 1959 : Andrea Ar Gouilh & Alan Cochevelou - Son an Hañv (Mouez Breizh)
- 1959 : Andrea Ar Gouilh & Alan Cochevelou - Marzhin en e gavell (Mouez Breizh)
- 1960 : Andrea Ar Gouilh & Alan Cochevelou - An hini a garan (Mouez Breizh)
- 1960 : Andrea Ar Gouilh & Gérard Pondaven - Douar va halon (Mouez Breizh)
- 1961 : Andrea Ar Gouilh & Alan Cochevelou - Va c'halon zo e Breizh-Izel (Mouez Breizh)

=== Participations ===
- 1973 : Beilhadeg e Menez-Kamm (rencontre Bretagne/Euzkadi/Occitanie), Artfolk
- 1975 : La Bretagne noce et fest-noz, 33 t, Barclay
- 1988 : Euroskol 88/Breizh-Europa, Diwan Euroskol
- 2000 : Hommage / Da enoriñ Glenmor
