= Corbel (disambiguation) =

- A corbel is a weight-bearing architectural element embedded in a wall to carry a structural load.

Corbel may also refer to:

- A corbel arch, an arch or vault produced by stacked cantilevered corbels
- An oval area surrounded by a fringe of bristles, near the tip of beetle tibiae
- Corbel, Savoie, Rhône-Alpes, France
- Corbel (typeface), a sans-serif typeface published by Microsoft
- Cécile Corbel (born 1980), French singer and musician
- Erwann Corbel (born 1991), French cyclist
- Georges Corbel, French field hockey player

== See also ==
- Corbell (disambiguation)
- Korbel (disambiguation)
