= Eveno =

- Pronunciation: pronounced [ˈe'vẽːno]

Origin
- Origin: Breton
- Meaning: Hypocorism of Even
- Region of origin: Brittany

Other names
- Variant forms: Evenno, Evenou, Evennou, Evennau, Evano, Evanno, Evenot, Evenat, Evenas

Eveno or Evenno is a surname, and may refer to:

Eveno derives from the given name Even deriving from the Old Breton Euuen.

- Bertrand Eveno, French senior civil servant and business executive
- Claude Eveno, French urban planner and director
- Patrick Eveno, French academic, specialist in media history
- Manu Eveno, guitarist of the band Tryo
- Michaël Eveno a.k.a. Grems (born 1978), Franco-Belgian rapper, designer and graffiti artist
- Danièle Évenou, French film, television and theater actress
- Erwan Evenou, Breton writer, linguist and political activist of the Breton language
- Philippe Evanno, French academic and political activist
- Brigitte Evanno (born 1952), French taekwondo practitioner
- Christophe Evano, French former professional basketball player
- Georges Evano, French architect
