= Bible translations into Celtic languages =

Translations of the Bible into Celtic languages have been made for hundreds of years, beginning most notably with the first complete translation into Welsh in the 16th century.

== Brythonic ==
=== Breton ===
The Bible in the Breton language was first translated by Jean-François Le Gonidec and published in 1827.

=== Cornish ===
Since the 17th century, translations of sections of the Bible into Cornish have existed. However, it was not until 2011 that the first complete translation of the Bible was published and later followed by the New Testament and Psalms in 2014.

=== Welsh ===
Similar to Cornish translations, parts of the Bible have been reportedly translated into Welsh since at least the 15th century, with the most widely used translation published in 1588 by William Morgan.

== Gaelic ==
=== Irish Gaelic ===
Irish translations of the Bible were first published in the 17th century, featuring the New Testament in 1602, the Old Testament in 1685, and finally the entirety of the Bible in 1690.

=== Manx ===
In the 17th and 18th centuries, the first Manx translations of the Bible were translated by John Phillips and completed a committee of clergy under the supervision of Bishop Mark Hildesley.

=== Scottish Gaelic ===
Since the 18th century, parts of the Bible were published in Scottish Gaelic: the New Testament in 1767 and, later, the entire Bible in 1801.
