= Me zo ganet e kreiz ar mor =

Song performed by Alan Stivell

"Me zo ganet e kreiz ar mor" ("I was born in the midst of the sea") is an autobiographical poem by the Breton-language writer Yann-Ber Kalloc'h which celebrates the island of Groix, where he was born, and describes his parents' struggles and his own.

In a setting by Jef Le Penven, it has become one of the most popular Breton-language songs, performed by Alan Stivell, Yann-Fañch Kemener, Julie Fowlis and others. The title has several variants, including Me zo ganet e kreiz er mor and Me zo gañnet é kreiz er mor.

== Summary ==
The narrator describes the island of Groix where he was born. He explains that his father is a sailor, as his own forefathers were, and that he works with his mother in the fields to feed himself. Then he declares to Saint Mary that their happiness has left in a coffin to sleep in the field of mourning. But he considers that these tears are in vain, that you have to be strong for tomorrow. With his worldly happiness erased, the seminary, then the army, he walked towards God, reflecting on what he can say to him while awaiting his judgment.

== Origins ==
The text is the work of Yann-Ber Kalloc'h (born Jean-Pierre Calloc'h, and also known as Bleimor), a poet born on the island of Groix, Morbihan, off the coast of Brittany, in 1888. After his death in action on 10 April 1917, this poem was published in Ar en deulin (1921), a collection of his works edited by his friend Pierre Mocaër. It also appeared a few years later in Minhoarheu ha dareu. Sourires et pleurs. Poésies de Bretagne (Quimper, 1926). It was set to music by Jef Le Penven (1919–1967), a Breton composer, conductor and folksong-collector. Le Penven's song, with its flexibility of musical phrase and sensitivity to the language of the original poem, suggests both traditional Breton laments and more modern idioms.

== Interpretations ==
In the 1960s, Eliane Pronost, accompanied by the Kanerien Bro-Ouelou Plouézec choir, performed it on a 45 rpm record on the Mouez Breiz label, followed by Rozenn Bellec and Soazig Noblet, also on Mouez-Breiz. The song was popularised by Alan Stivell under the title Je suis né au milieu de la mer on his first album Reflets. It was performed by Héritage des Celtes on their 1994 self-titled album, and by Yann-Fañch Kemener with Didier Squiban on the album Enez Eusa (1996). In 1997 the Celtic rock band L'Ange vert recorded it on their album Les Armes de Bretagne, and Andrea Ar Gouilh on Priñs ar C'hornog aour: hommage à Jef Le Penven. Julie Fowlis included a Gaelic version of the song on her 2009 album Uam. In 2021, 50 years after the version popularized by Alan Stivell, the group Fleuves rearranged the melody accompanied by the vocals of Sarah Floc'h on the EP Odyssea.
