= Jef Le Penven =

French composer (1919–1967)

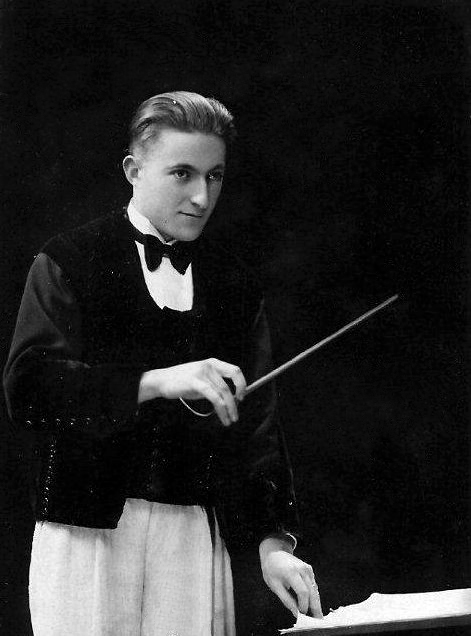
Jef Le Penven conducting the Orchestre de Bretagne

Jef Le Penven (3 November 1919 - 30 April 1967) was a French composer born in Pontivy, Morbihan, Brittany.

Le Penven was the twelfth child of a family of cabinet makers. He grew up in an atmosphere of traditional vernacular music, learning to play the bombard (Breton oboe) as a child. He studied at the Schola Cantorum in Paris under Marcel Dupré.

In 1940, he became the conductor of the Orchestre de Bretagne.

Le Penven's music reflects his deep attachment to Brittany and Celtic culture. He sought to integrate traditional and symphonic music. His major works employ conventional symphonic and choral forms while typically incorporating bagpipe music.

Le Penven was also renowned for his organ improvisations, of which he was a virtuoso.

His setting of the poem Me zo ganet e kreiz ar mor by Yann-Ber Kalloc'h has been interpreted by several Breton musicians, including Gilles Servat and Alan Stivell.

== Compositions ==
- Tir Na Nog, La Marche des Bretons
- Les Celtes
- Cantate du Bout du Monde
- Symphonie du Morbihan
