= Korbel =

Korbel may refer to:

== Companies ==
- Korbel Champagne Cellars

== Places ==
- Korbel, Humboldt County, California
- Korbel, Sonoma County, California

== People ==
- Daniel Korbel, Canadian bridge player.
- Jan O. Korbel (born 1975), German biologist
- Josef Korbel (1909–1977), Czech-American diplomat and educator
- Charly Körbel (born 1954), German footballer
- Mario Korbel (1882–1954), Czech-American sculptor
- Petr Korbel (born 1971), Czech table tennis player

== See also ==
- Killing of Olivia Pratt-Korbel
- Josef Korbel School of International Studies, a graduate school for international affairs at the University of Denver
- Nolwenn Korbell (born 1968), French singer-songwriter
- Corbel (disambiguation)
- Corbell (disambiguation)
- Corbeau (disambiguation)
