= Corbell =

Corbell is a surname. Notable people with the name include:

- Jeremy Kenyon Lockyer Corbell (born 1977), American artist and filmmaker
- Simon Corbell (born 1970), former Australian politician
- Jerome Branch Corbell, a main character in the novel A World Out of Time

== See also ==
- Nolwenn Korbell (born 1968), French singer-songwriter
- Corbell, a brand of pan
- Corbel (disambiguation)
- Korbel (disambiguation)
