= The Horse of Pride =

- VHS cover
- Directed by: Claude Chabrol
- Screenplay by: Daniel Boulanger
- Based on: Le cheval d'orgueil by Pêr-Jakez Helias
- Produced by: Georges de Beauregard
- Starring: Jacques Dufilho; Bernadette Le Saché
- Narrated by: Georges Wilson
- Cinematography: Jean Rabier
- Edited by: Monique Fardoulis
- Music by: Pierre Jansen
- Production companies: Bela Productions; TF1; Planfilm
- Distributed by: Union Générale Cinématographique (UGC)
- Release date: 24 September 1980
- Running time: 120 minutes
- Country: France
- Language: French

The Horse of Pride is a 1980 rural drama film directed by Claude Chabrol. Its title in French is Le cheval d'orgueil. It is based on Le cheval d'orgueil, an autobiography by Pêr-Jakez Helias. The film takes place in the Bigouden area south of Quimper.

== Plot ==
Set in Brittany from 1908–1918, two peasants marry, have a son, and live in traditional Breton ways which is three generations under one roof, a division of labor between the sexes, elders' stories at night, politics and religion during their little free time. These are difficult times for them – la Chienne du Monde drives some to commit suicide; Ankou (death) is always a possibility. Pierre is born into this provincial family, his lyric childhood interrupted by the outbreak of war and his father's conscription. He learns his catechism and, as a child of a Reds, also reveres school. His grandfather and father often put him on their shoulders, giving him a ride on the horse of pride.

== Principal cast ==
| Actor | Role |
|---|---|
| Jacques Dufilho | Alain, le grand-père |
| Bernadette Le Saché | Anne-Marie, la mère |
| François Cluzet | Pierre-Alain, le père |
| Paul Le Person | Gourgon, le facteur |
| Pierre Le Rumeur | Le conteur |
| Michel Robin | Le marquis |
| Ronan Hubert | Pierre-Jacques à 7 ans |
| Armel Hubert | Pierre-Jacques à 11 ans |
| Michel Blanc | Corentin Calvez |
| Dominique Lavanant | Marie-Jeanne, la sage-femme |

== Critical reception ==
Vincent Canby of The New York Times:

Mr. Chabrol makes no attempt to impose an artificial narrative on the film. Instead he simply presents the births and deaths as they happen, the good times and the bad, taking time out to explain the Bretons' customs, their superstitions, their fierce nationalism and their love for their own Celtic language... The movie, handsomely photographed by Jean Rabier, is packed with lore, a lot of it awfully poetic... The Horse of Pride is an oddball if totally sincere footnote to the Chabrol career.

Jackson Adler of Time Out London:

Stressing the poverty, it caresses the eye with picturesque interiors worthy of any model village, while the peasants decked out in their national costumes look like delegates to a folk-lore congress. Hardly another Tree of Wooden Clogs, but it does have charm, sparks of Chabrol clownery, and plenty of intriguing information about superstitions and customs. One problem is that the autobiographical book by Pierre Jakez Hélias on which it is based has obviously been too severely truncated.
