= Auguste Brizeux =

French poet (1803–1858)

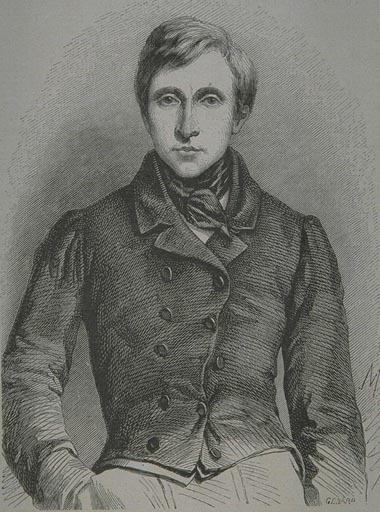
- Born: Julien Pélage Auguste Brizeux; 12 September 1803; Lorient, Brittany, France
- Died: 3 May 1858 (aged 54); Montpellier, Occitania, France
- Resting place: Carnel Cemetery
- Occupation: Poet
- Writing career
- Language: French
- Period: 1827–1852
- Notable work: Marie; Les Bretons
- Literary movement: Romanticism

Julien Pélage Auguste Brizeux ([ʒyljɛ̃ pelaʒ oɡyst bʁizø]; 12 September 1803 – 3 May 1858) was a French poet. He was said to belong to a family of Irish origin, but long settled in Brittany. He was educated for the law, but in 1827 he produced at the Théâtre Français a one-act verse comedy, Racine, in collaboration with Philippe Busoni.

His most important works are, first, Marie (1832, 1836, 1840), then, Les Bretons (1845, 1846). He also wrote in his native Cornouaille dialect of the Breton language, most notably Telenn-Arvor and Furnez Breiz.

== Life ==
Brizeux was born at Lorient, Morbihan. Though he was brought up with the Cornouaille dialect of Breton, in his Breton language verse he used the standardised Breton orthography codified by Jean-François Le Gonidec. He became an ardent student of the philology and archaeology of Brittany, and had collected materials for a dictionary of Breton place-names.

A journey to Italy in company with Auguste Barbier made a great impression on him, and a second visit (1834) resulted in 1841 in the publication of a complete French translation of Dante's Divine Comedy in terza rima. In his collection Primel el Nola (1852) he included poems written under Italian influence, entitled Les Ternaires (1841), but in the rustic idyll of Marie (1836) he turned to Breton country life. In Les Bretons (1845) he found his inspiration in the folklore and legends of his native province. In La Chasse du Prince Arthur he created a narrative around the short life of Arthur I, Duke of Brittany, murdered by King John of England. His Histoires poétiques (1855) was crowned by membership in the French Academy.

Following his death at Montpellier in 1858, his Œuvres complètes (2 vols., 1860) were edited with an assessment of the author by Saint-René Taillandier. Another edition appeared in 1880–1884 (4 vols.). A long list of articles on his work may be consulted in an exhaustive monograph, Brizeux. Sa vie et ses œuvres (1898), by the abbé Constantin Lecigne.

Known as "le prince des bardes bretons", he was credited as the founder of modern Breton literature by later Breton Celticists. Théodore Botrel created a monument to him in Pont-Aven, which is ceremonially adorned each year at the Fête des Fleurs d’Ajonc. His works in Breton, Telenn Arvor (1844), and his collection of proverbs, Furnez Breiz (1845), were republished by Roparz Hemon in the Breton language literary magazine Gwalarn in 1929.

== Works ==
- Racine, one-act comedy in verse, with Philippe Busoni, Paris, Théâtre-Français, 27 décembre 1827
- Marie, verse novel, 1832 on line text
- Les Ternaires, book of lyrics, 1841
- Les Bretons, narrative poem, 1845
- Furnez Breiz, 1845 Text in Wikisource
- Histoires poétiques, suivies d'un Essai sur l'art, ou Poétique nouvelle, 1855 on line text
- Primel et Nola, 1852

Editions and translations

- Mémoires de Madame de La Vallière, 2 vol., 1829
- La Divine Comédie de Dante Alighieri, traduction nouvelle par A. Brizeux,.avec une notice et des notes par le même, 1841

Posthumous publications

- Œuvres complètes, 2 vol., 1860 on line text 1 2
- Œuvres, 1874 on line text
- Œuvres, 4 vol., 1879-1884 on line texts 1 : Marie. Télen Arvor. Furnez Breiz. 2 : Les Bretons. 3 : Les Fleurs d'or (Les Ternaires). Histoires poétiques I-III 4 : Histoires poétiques IV-V. Cycle. Poétique nouvelle.
- Marie, poème. Primel et Nola, preface by Saint-René Taillandier, illustrations by Henri Pille, 1882
- Œuvres choisies, 1910
- Choix de poésies, 1932
- Telenn arvor furnez Breiz peurreizet hag embannet gant Roparz Hemo, 1932
- Un Poète romantique et ses amis : correspondance 1805-1858. Auguste Brizeux, letters, edited by Jean-Louis Debauve, Brest, Centre de recherche bretonne et celtique, 1989

== Legacy ==
In 1888, a monument was created in the town of Lorient in tribute to Brizeux.

In Brittany, 1 elementary school, 2 middle schools, and 1 high school were named after him, as well as 19 streets in various towns of France.

== See also ==
- Orientalism
