= Pêr-Jakez Helias =

Breton nationalist and artist (1914–1995)

Pêr-Jakez Helias, baptised Pierre-Jacques Hélias, nom de plume Pierre-Jakez Hélias (1914–1995) was a Breton stage actor, journalist, author, poet, and writer for radio who worked in the French and Breton languages. For many years he directed a weekly radio programme in the Breton language and co-founded an Eisteddfod-inspired summer festival at Quimper, France, which became the Festival de Cornouaille.

== Life and work ==
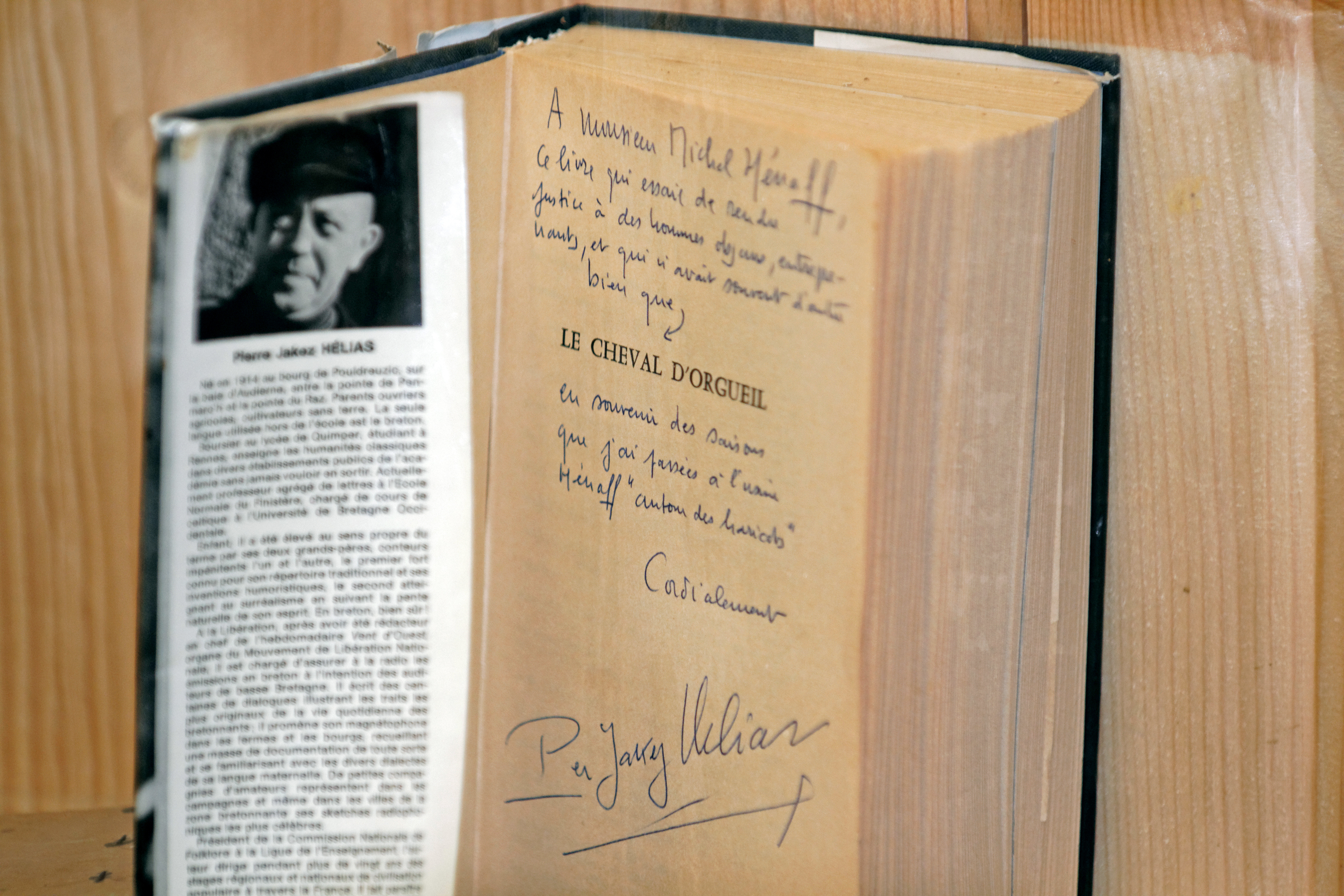
"Exposition sur l'histoire du Pâté Hénaff" dans le musée de la marque à Pouldreuzic

Helias was born in 1914 in Pouldreuzig, Penn-ar-Bed, Brittany. His father, Pierre-Alain Hélias, was a native of the nearby village of Plozévet. Helias' mother, Marie-Jeanne Le Goff, had grown up in Pouldreuzic, to which her husband moved after their wedding in 1913. Hélias' paternal grandfather, Yann Helias, was a tenant farmer, sabot-maker, and storyteller known in Plozévet as Yann ar Burzudou ("Yann the Wonder-Man").

Pierre-Alain Hélias had previously served at Vannes in an artillery unit of the French Army and, upon the outbreak of World War I in August 1914, he was recalled to active service. Pierre-Jacques Hélias later recalled that, during his father's combat duty as a Poilu on the Western Front, he and his mother were given, "twenty sous a day... to keep ourselves alive". His father's sickle was wielded during harvest-time by his mother and was sharpened upon a stone moistened with her tears. Hélias further recalled, "When my father returned home from the battlefield, he let his wife keep the sickle. For he thought he was no longer its master, that mother had truly earned it... In the end, its blade wasn't much bigger than that of a pocket knife. I rather think that tears are more effective than stone for wearing down a sickle." One of Hélias' maternal uncles, who had been serving before the war as an officer in French Indochina, was less fortunate, and returned to France only to be killed in action during the First World War.

While writing about "the last decades of the old Brittany" as described in Hélias' memoir, Marcus Tanner wrote, "His universe was peopled by poor families who spoke Breton, obeyed priests, went to Mass on Sundays and Holy Days and cured illnesses by visiting holy wells and making pilgrimages. Like their rural Irish contemporaries, their culture revered death, personified by the ankou, or grim reaper, and they strictly observed rituals before and after a relative's or neighbour's death... Departure from the world was a communal event, signalled to the whole parish and the men working in the fields by the ringing of the bells in the church. Nor were the dead left alone and forgotten after their burial, for Hélias recalled the sight of groups of women moving around the graveyards after Mass in their white coifs, murmuring paters and aves [for] the deceased."

Hélias had a modest upbringing, but this included a good education. During the interwar period, the village was divided between "Reds", who discretely supported the anti-clericalism taught in the schools run by of the Third French Republic, and "Whites", who supported the education of their children by the Catholic Church in France. Despite the deep religious piety of his mother, Pierre-Alain and Marie-Jeanne Hélias were "Reds" and, against the opposition of their parish priest, they chose to enroll their son in a secular and state-run school, in the hopes that he would learn French and move up in the world.

After a career in the French Resistance during the Second World War, in 1946 Helias was appointed as director of a weekly programme in Breton on Radio Kimerc'h.

Helias later recalled of the era, "As soon as World War II ended, 'Celtic Clubs' were being founded everywhere in Brittany, but especially in the Breton-speaking regions. The members were young people whose objective was to bring the peasant tradition, with all its costumes, its dances, and its games back into esteem. Within ten years several hundred of these groups had been organized. At the same time, thanks to the persistence of a few pioneers, other young people began to take lessons from the last of the professional bagpipers and oboeists, who were ending their lives in a state of melancholy... Think of thousands of young people involved in traditional art forms at a time when their traditions were both alive and threatened, perhaps even doomed, and faced with a new society which they couldn't count on in any way. How could they possibly not have protested?"

Working with Pierre Trépos, he wrote hundreds of dialogues, many of them between two stock characters, Gwilhou Vihan and Jakez Kroc'hen. In 1948 he was the co-founder, with François Bégot and Jo Halleguen, of Les grandes Fêtes de Cornouaille (Cornouaille Kemper) in Quimper, an Eisteddfod-inspired summer festival celebrating Breton culture.

The stage play was Helias' favourite genre, as he was convinced that Breton culture was primarily a spoken one, so that it could best be captured by drama, and much of his early work was in the form of plays and scripts for radio. His An Isild a-heul, or Yseulte seconde (1963), was a three-act tragedy based on the story of Tristan and Isolde, but with a focus on Tristan's wife rather than his lover. Written as was his usual practice first in Breton the self-translated into French, it was published in a dual text, with the French translation on the facing page, and was broadcast on the France Culture radio station in 1965.

Helias's best-known and most often performed play is Mevel ar Gosker, or 'The Yardman of Kosker'. A mevel bras (majordomo) was the most important farm worker, a man who might enjoy many privileges, but who was not of the landowning class and it was inconceivable in traditional Breton culture that he could aspire to marry into it. However, the mevel of the play, Jakez Mano, contrives by a highly complicated means to marry his employer's daughter, God Konan. The fact that he can actually achieve this is seen as proof that the old Brittany, in which marriages were always within the same social class, is changing.

Helias's poetry includes two collections in Breton, Ar men du (1974, The Black Stone) and An tremen-buhez (1979, The Pastime). An important theme in his work was his devotion to the Breton language and its power. One of his lines translates as "Breton speaker that I am, my heritage lies on my tongue, it shall never be yours".

His best-selling work is his memoir Le cheval d'orgueil, or The Horse of Pride, rooted in his native Bigoudenn district south of Quimper. While his self-translation into French was published first, the original text in Breton, Breton: Marh ar lorh, also became available in print once its success had turned Hélias into an international celebrity.

Helias also collected Breton folk tales and published work on the Breton language and culture. He became a major figure in Breton literature during the last third of the 20th century and the Encyclopædia Britannica of 1997 says of him, "Per-Jakez Helias as poet, playwright, and radio script writer has been both prolific and popular."

Despite his importance to Breton literature, Helias came under fire from far left radicals promoting language revival, Breton nationalism, and Anti-French sentiment. This was only partly due to Helias' willingness to write in French and his refusal to denounce that language. In Le cheval d'orgueil, Helias was attacked for admitting that his parents chose to enroll him in the village school out of a desire for him to succeed and that, as a child, he enjoyed learning French, even though Helias later expressed resentment at how often he and his fellow students were punished at school for speaking Breton or for speaking French imperfectly. An older Helias was particularly annoyed at this because French-speaking children in working class urban neighborhoods spoke with very similar turns of phrase.

This was far from uncommon at the time, though, and during an early 21st century interview with Marcus Tanner, Ronan le Coadic explained that post-1789 French Government schools have successfully sold the French language as, "the language of progress" and have taught minority language speakers that, "All others were the languages of the Church and the nobility. Children were taught that Breton was the language of poverty and the past. Even recently I have interviewed people who recalled their shame at school for knowing Breton."

In contrast, ever since Pope Gregory XI issued the règle d'idiom ("the rule of idiom") in 1373, Roman Catholic clergy were commanded to learn how to preach to and communicate with their flocks in the vernacular. This is also why, ever since the French Revolution, the traditional proverb in the Breton language (Breton: "Ar brezonek hag ar feiz, A zo breur ha c'hoar e Breiz") ("Breton and [the] Faith are brother and sister in Brittany"), was once commonly quoted.

For this reason, unlike other Breton language revivalists of his time, Hélias did not solely blame the French Government or the coercive Francization of the state schools for the recent collapse en masse that he had witnessed of the Breton language and culture. He also expressed extremely harsh criticism of the actions of local Catholic bishops and clergy during the aftermath of the Second Vatican Council. The removal of often centuries-old works of Christian art and the replacement of the Tridentine Mass in Ecclesiastical Latin with the Mass of Paul VI in French, instead of in Breton, was, in Hélias' opinion, far more to blame and had also caused the recent secularization of the region.

He wrote, "There were Reds in the Church, people said. Soon everyone was to go to Mass as they went to school. In other words, some were to be good pupils and others bad pupils. Not so very long ago, everyone understood everything in the same way; each one of them truly partook of the sacraments; and they all knew several hymns by heart, hymns that rang out through the church. Now, the singing rings hollow; indeed, the elderly don't even dare participate. Mass is no longer a joy; it's not even restful. Lukewarm soup without any flavor."

Even though Hélias ended his memoir by expressing hope for a Breton, Basque, and Provençal language revival, radical nationalists, like Xavier Grall, condemned his memoir as folklore. Furthermore, John Ardagh commented in 1982, "Brittany's two writers most famous in France as a whole, Per-Jakez Helias and Jean-Edern Hallier, are regarded with some scorn by the Breton zealots."

Helias died on 13 August 1995 in Quimper, Brittany. According to Marcus Tanner, despite the controversy that greeted him upon their release, Hélias' memoirs are still used very successfully to attract tourism to the region of Brittany where he grew up and whose threatened culture he immortalized in Le cheval d'orgueil.

== In popular culture ==
- Hélias's memoir was adapted into a film of the same name by director Claude Chabrol in 1980.

== Selected publications ==
- Biskoaz kemend-all (1947)
- Eun ano bras, darvoud en eun arvest (1953)
- War eun dachenn foball (1955)
- Danses de Bretagne (1955)
- Mojennou Breiz I (1957)
- Tan ha ludu (1957)
- Eun den maro ha ne goll ket e benn (1958)
- Mojennou Breiz II (1959)
- Mevel ar Gosker (play, 1959)
- Kanadenn Penn ar Bed (1959)
- Marvaillou ar votez-tan. Contes bretons du sabot à feu (1961)
- Comme on connaît ses saints (1961)
- An Izild a-heul; Yseult seconde (play, 1963)
- Maner Kuz. Manoir secret (1964)
- Divizou eun amzer gollet. Devis d'un temps perdu (1966)
- Contes bretons du pays bigouden (1967)
- Bretagne aux légendes : la mer (1967)
- Costumes de Bretagne (1969)
- Contes bretons de la Chantepleure (1971)
- Tradition bretonne : le savoir-vivre (1973)
- Légendes du Raz de Sein (1972)
- Ar men du; la pierre noire (poetry, 1974)
- Le cheval d'orgueuil, Mémoires d'un Breton du pays bigouden (autobiography, 1975)
- Tradition bretonne : logis et ménages (1975)
- Comment un Breton devint roi d'Angleterre (1976)
- Les autres et les miens: le trésor du Cheval d'orgueil (1977)
- Peziou-c'hoari Jakez Krohen (1977)
- Penaoz e teuas eur Breizad da veza roue Bro-Zaoz (1977)
- Le Grand valet, La Femme de paille, Le Tracteur - Théâtre I (1977)
- Lettres de Bretagne: langues, culture et civilisations bretonnes (1978)
- An tremen-buhez; le passe-vie (poetry, 1979)
- La sagesse de la terre (1980)
- Quimper en Cornouaille (1980)
- Au pays du Cheval d'orgueil (1980)
- Piou e-neus lazet an hini koz? (1981)
- L'esprit du rivage (1981)
- L'herbe d'or (novel, 1982)
- Images de Bretagne (1983)
- La colline des solitudes (novel, 1984)
- Les contes du vrai et du semblant (1984)
- Marh ar lorh: pennadou bet dibabet evid ar skoliou (Breton autobiography, 1986)
- Dictionnaire bretons. Breton-français, français-bretons (1986)
- Bugale Berlobi I - Brud an Dreued (1987)
- Lisbonne (1987)
- Bugale Berlobi II - Marvaillou da veva en ho sav (1988)
- Vent de soleil (1988)
- Midi à ma porte (1988)
- Amsked. Pobl an noz; Clair-obscur. Le peuple de la nuit (1990)
- Le quêteur de mémoire: quarante ans de recherche sur les mythes et la civilisation bretonne (1990)
- La nuit singulière (1990)
- D'un autre monde; A-berz eur bed all (poetry, 1991)
- Katrina Lenn-zu (1993)
- Le diable à quatre (novel, 1993)
- Le piéton de Quimper (1993)
- Ruz-Kov ar foeterez-vro: gand seiteg tresadenn war pri-poaz gand Dodik (1996)
- Ventre-à-Terre, l'aventurier
- Un pays à deux langues (2000)
