= Elaine Morgan (singer) =

Welsh folk singer

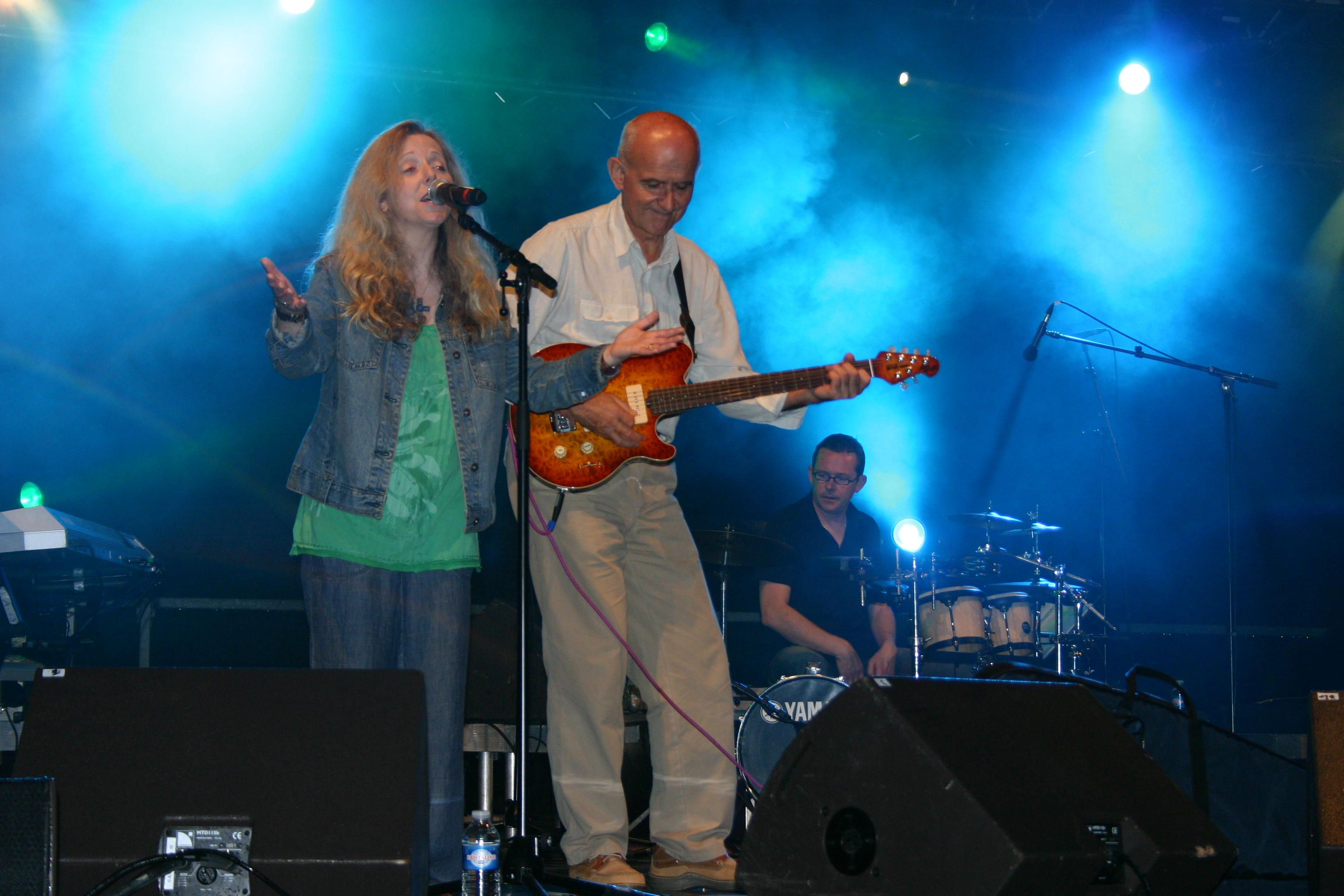
Elaine Morgan in concert with Dan Ar Braz, 2008

Elaine Morgan (born 1960, Cardiff) is a Welsh folk singer. She was a member of Dan Ar Braz's group L'Heritage des Celtes, and often sang lead vocals, either alone or jointly with Karen Matheson. Morgan and Matheson received much acclaim for their performance on the Breton-language song Diwanit Bugale, France's entry to the Eurovision Song Contest 1996. Formed her own folk-rock band Rose among Thorns together with her husband Derek and produced several albums throughout the nineties. Currently involved in the running of the Rumney Folk Club in Cardiff. Has also worked with members of Fairport Convention and featured with them at their annual Cropredy gathering.

== Personal life ==
Elaine is the youngest of three sisters.

== Discography ==
- 1989: First Blush
- 199x: Rose Among Thorns
- 199x: This Time It's Real
- 199x: Butterfly Dreams
- 1996: Highlights (compilation)
- 2002: Shine On
