= La Blanche Hermine =

Song by Gilles Servat

from the album La Blanche Hermine
- Released: 1971
- Genre: Folk
- Length: 3:47
- Label: Kelenn, Phonogram
- Songwriter(s): Gilles Servat

Music video
- "La Blanche Hermine" (2014 video) on YouTube

La Blanche Hermine (French for "The White Ermine") is a 1970 song by French singer Gilles Servat with lyrics affirming the Breton identity. It was first published on the eponymous album from 1971, which was certified gold. Calling for an armed uprising against the French, the song quickly became an anthem in Brittany and popular in all of France.

== Song ==
The song is a rhymed seven-syllable laisse. The ermine from the title was the heraldic animal of the Duchy of Brittany, a sovereign feudal state.

The lyrics are about a villager who meets "a band of sailors, workers and peasants" who are going to ambush the "Franks" and win their freedom. He joins them and sings about the plight of his wife, visiting her and children in secret during the war, and possibly dying for his homeland.

The chorus mentions the fortresses of Fougères and Clisson, which seems to point to the feudal wars of the Bretons against the French at the border of the duchy. However, the rebels' "charged guns" indicate a more recent past; therefore, the only plausible period is believed to be the Chouannerie war of the French Revolution, popularized by La Villemarqué in Barzaz Breiz. The song is often found in collections dedicated to the Chouans, the War in the Vendée, and the Legitimists, but also in general collections of military songs.

== Background ==
Servat wrote the song in 1970, at the age of 25, while living in Paris. The day before, he had heard an Irish song about the departure of a guerilla fighter with a bullet in his pocket. That same evening, he sang it for the first time at Ti Jos, a Breton restaurant at Montparnasse, where he made a living by begging. The words and the protest energy of the song made a big impression on the Bretons, which surprised the artist himself.

After the protests of May 68, Brittany had gone through an identity crisis and an economic transition. Servat wrote the warrior song to make the Bretons aware of their plight and inspire an uprising:

It's become a traditional song. But that's not how we saw it. We actually wanted to make war. Everything was so dark. Brittany was losing population, the language was dying, it looked as if Brittany would become one big resort. And there was no Europe back then! We were alone against a great power, which was represented by Marcellin, no less...

== Bibliography in French ==
- Daniel Chatelain and Pierre Tafini, Qu'est ce qui fait courir les autonomistes ?, Stock, 1976
- Erwan Chartier, Gilles Servat. Portrait, Blanc Silex, 2004
- Guy Millière, Gilles Servat, poésie et chansons, Seghers, 1975
