= Georges Corbel =

French field hockey player (1942–2015)

Personal information
- Nationality: French
- Born: 21 August 1942 Lyon, France
- Died: 18 February 2015 (aged 72) Bron, France

Sport
- Sport: Field hockey

Georges Corbel (21 August 1942 – 18 February 2015) was a French field hockey player. He competed at the 1968 Summer Olympics and the 1972 Summer Olympics.

Corbel debuted for the French national team at age 18 in 1960. The same year, he appeared as a non-playing reserve in the 1960 Summer Olympics. In the French national league, Corbel played for Bordeaux SAVP and FC Lyon Henri Cochet (FCLHC) - named after tennis player Henri Cochet. For FC Lyon Henri Cochet, he won ten consecutive league titles, from 1968 to 1977. He coached the French national junior team and the French men's national field hockey team from 1978 to 1981. Corbel served as president of the French Field Hockey Federation from 1994 to 1996.
