= An Dialog etre Arzur Roe d'an Bretounet ha Guynglaff =

Oldest surviving Breton Arthurian poem

An Dialog etre Arzur Roe d'an Bretounet ha Guynglaff ("The Dialogue Between Arthur, King of the Bretons, and Guynglaff") is an anonymous poem in 247 lines relating the apocalyptic prophecies which King Arthur extracted from one Guynglaff, a wild man, prophet and magician closely analogous to Merlin in the earliest Welsh tradition. It dates from about the middle of the 15th century, making it the oldest surviving work of literature in the Breton language.

== Synopsis ==
The poem begins by introducing us to the character of Guynglaff, a wild man of the woods. Guynglaff is captured by King Arthur, who questions him as to the signs and wonders which will precede the end of the world. Guynglaff lists these prodigies: summer and winter will be interchanged, children will have grey hair, heresy will triumph, and so on. When Arthur asks what will happen before these things Guynglaff responds with a series of predictions relating to the years 1570 to 1588, detailing the periods of war, death and peace that will follow on one another. The years after this, Guynglaff says in reply to another question from Arthur, will be marked by storms, immorality and the ravages of war against the English. Many of the events predicted are localised, always to the region between Guingamp and Port-Blanc in the modern department of Côtes-d'Armor. The poem ends with Guynglaff's prediction of the conquest of Brittany by invading English armies.

== Date and authorship ==
The name of the poem's author is not known, but it is apparent that he was a well-read man, skilled in the traditional system of Breton versification. He may have been associated with the abbey of Daoulas.

The incipit of the poem states that it was written in the year 1450 and this date is accepted by modern scholars as being at least approximately correct, with the proviso that it may be a reworking of earlier material. However the poem's many references to dates in the 1580s show that it was modified in the late 16th century or early 17th century.

== Analogues ==
There is a strong Celtic tradition of prophetic poetry. Examples include the Welsh Armes Prydein and Ymddiddan Myrddin a Thaliesin (another dialogue); also the later Breton Sybilla Erytrea and the Latin Prophetiae Merlini. Parallels with the British Merlin, the Irish Suibhne, and the Scottish Lailoken are so strong that he might be called an avatar of them. Like Merlin, Guynglaff is a wild man of the woods, a prophet, and a magician. He is caught by Arthur just as Merlin is Rodarcus in Geoffrey of Monmouth's Vita Merlini, and the description of Guynglaff's life as a wild man of the woods echoes that of Merlin in the same poem.

== Influence ==
There is much evidence, of varying reliability, that prophetic verses ascribed to one Gwenc'hlan, thought to be identical with Guynglaff, were in circulation in 19th-century Brittany both in manuscript and oral form. These prophecies probably derive from the Dialog.

== Manuscript and editions ==
The only surviving manuscript of the poem dates from 1716, it can be found at the Rennes Métropole library (MS 1007). Its redactor, Louis Le Pelletier, took his text from a manuscript of 1619, though he added variant readings from a second, probably older, manuscript. Both of these manuscripts are believed to be at some distance from the original, and in consequence the text has been badly corrupted. Le Pelletier's manuscript disappeared in the 18th century, leaving the world with no knowledge of the poem apart from a few references by Le Pelletier and his contemporaries, but it was rediscovered by Francis Gourvil in 1924 in the Château de Keromnès, Locquénolé, Finistère.

The poem was edited first in 1929 by René Largillière, with a French translation. The Breton text alone was printed again in 1941 and 1994 in Breton journals. In 1999 the Breton text was published with an English translation:

- Antone Minard, “‘The dialogue between King Arthur and Gwenc'hlan’: a translation”, Comitatus: A Journal of Medieval and Renaissance Studies 30 (1999): 167–179.

The most modern edition, with French translation, introduction and notes, appeared in 2013:

- Hervé Le Bihan An dialog etre Arzur Roe d'an Bretounet ha Guynglaff = Le dialogue entre Arthur roi des Bretons et Guynglaff: texte prophétique breton en vers (1450) (Rennes: TIR, 2013).
