= Buhez Sante Barba =

Buhez Sante Barba ("The Life of Saint Barbara") is a mystery play in Middle Breton verse on the life and miracles of the martyr Saint Barbara, daughter of King Dioscurus of Nicomedia. It first appeared in print in 1557.

== Synopsis ==
Barbara, who has secretly embraced the Christian faith, is carefully guarded by her pagan father, who keeps her shut up in a tower in order to preserve her from the outside world. Barbara convinces the builders of her prison to put in three rather than two windows. When her father finally learns that the three windows are intended to symbolise the Holy Trinity, he realises that Barbara has denounced the old gods and converted to Christianity. Dioscurus is furious and decides to kill her, but God transports her to the mountains, where she meets two shepherds, Gueguen and Rivallen. When her father comes looking for her, Rivallen, though initially known as a villain, claims not to have seen her. The 'good shepherd', however, Gueguen, betrays her and is miraculously transformed into a rock. Dioscurus sends her to his torturers, who do not shrink back from employing a variety of techniques to inflict pain and suffering, including the use of fire, knives and hammers. The blow of mercy comes when Barbara is beheaded by her own father.
