= Nolwenn Korbell =

French singer-songwriter (born 1968)

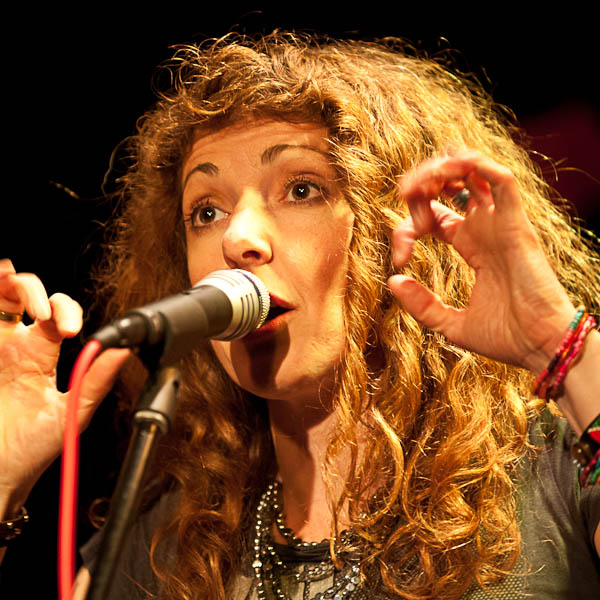
- Nolwenn Korbell in Gouesnach

Background information
- Born: 3 February 1968 (age 58); Quimper, France
- Genre: Breton singing
- Occupation: Singer-songwriter
- Instruments: Vocals, guitar
- Years active: 1984–present
- Label: Coop Breizh
- Website: http://www.myspace.com/nolwennkorbell

Nolwenn Korbell (French pronunciation: [nɔlwɛn kɔʁbɛl]; born 3 February 1968 in Quimper, Finistère), is a French Breton singer-songwriter. Best known for her songs in Breton, with her musicians or in a duet with guitarist Soïg Sibéril, she released four albums, regularly performs in concerts, and also keeps acting in plays and films.

== Biography ==
Nolwenn Korbell spent her childhood in Douarnenez with her younger brother and her parents, gwerz singer Andrea Ar Gouilh and Hervé Corbel, also a Breton music amateur. All four of them spoke Breton in their daily life, and Nolwenn learnt French at school. She followed her mother during her tours in the Celtic nations, where she heard Welsh, Irish and Scottish people sing in their respective languages.

She began taking theatre classes in her teens. At 16, she played in sketches during the Nuit des Raouls, a pastiche of the César Awards ceremony. Youenn Gwernig, the head of Breton language programs of France 3 Ouest, noticed her. In 1984, France 3 bought the rights of a Welsh cartoon in order to dub it in Breton, and Gwernig gave her the female character's role.

During two years, she studied modern languages at University of Rennes 2, learning German, Breton and Welsh. She spent three years in the Dramatic Arts Conservatory in Rennes, learning lyrical singing, and performing as a soprano in the band Arsis Théâtre Vocal. She hosted television programs on France 3 Ouest.

In 1989, she appeared in a few episodes of the Welsh language soap-opera "Pobol Y Cwm", produced by BBC Wales for the Welsh fourth television channel, S4C.

Between 1991 and 1999, she lived between Brittany and Wales, the home land of her partner, Twm Morys. She sang in his band, Bob Delyn a'r Ebillion. At that time, she played in short and long films by Olivier Bourbeillon, Simon Hymphries. In 1997, she competed in the Kan ar Bobl, a Breton singing contest that brought to fame, among others, Yann-Fañch Kemener and Denez Prigent. There, she sang Ma c'hemenerez (My seamstress), a song she wrote as a tribute to her grandmother, and won the first prize. In 2000, after the birth of her son Gwion, she went back to France in order to devote herself to theatre and singing.

In 2002, she sang during the Tombées de la Nuit. The two heads of Coop Breizh were in the audience and offer her to record an album.

== Music ==
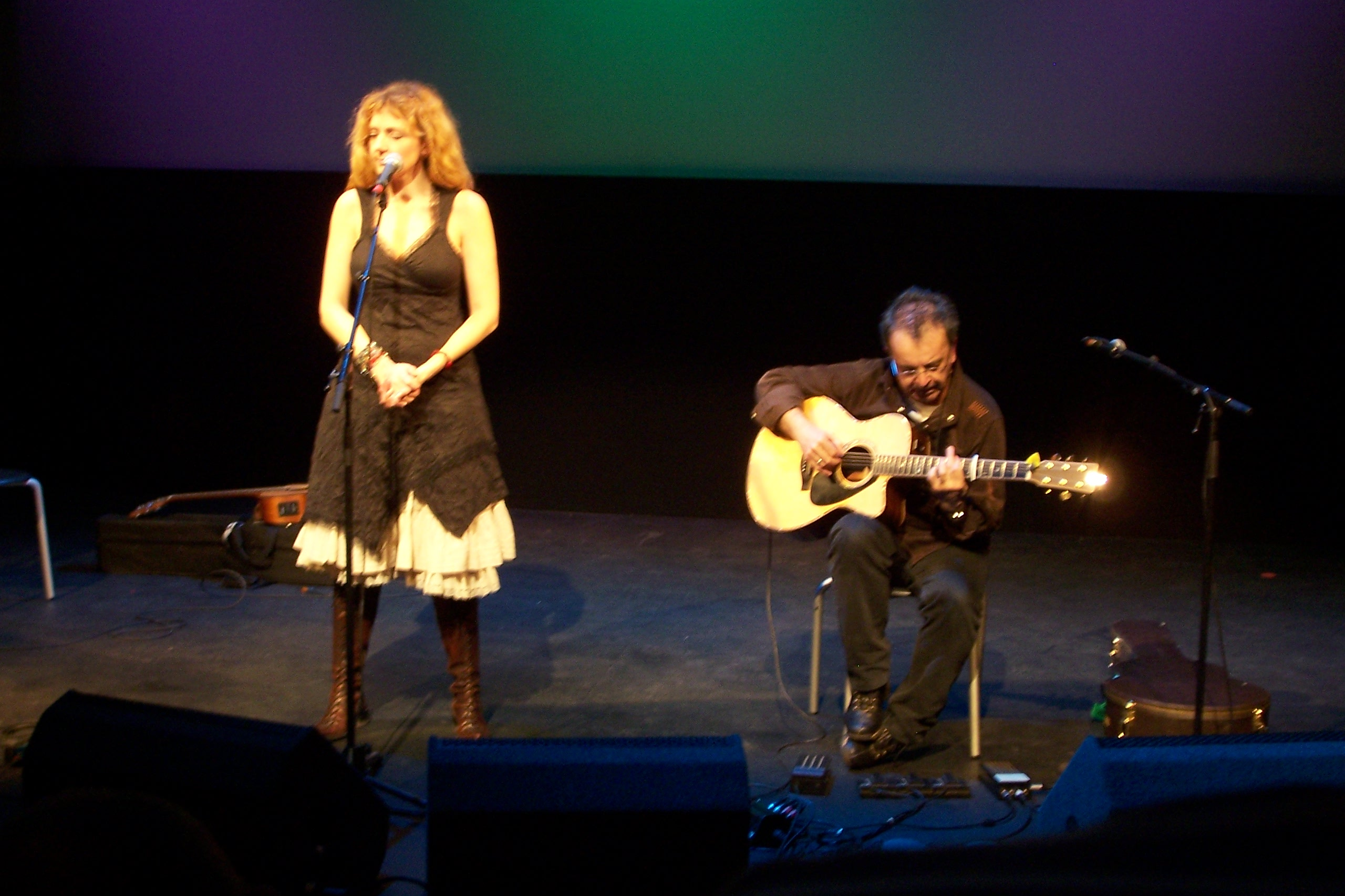
Nolwenn Korbell and Soïg Sibéril

=== N'eo ket echu ===
N'eo ket echu (It is not over), her first album, was released in the end of 2003. This title was chosen so that anyone can find their own meaning in it: it can, for example, refer to the end of a love relationship that leaves some hope, to the Breton language and culture that are still alive, or to a work of art, like the album itself, that is never over because it is always possible to give a new interpretation of it.

All the songs are in Breton, except Y byd newydd ("The new world"), which is in Welsh. All the lyrics were by Nolwenn Korbell, except those of Plac'h ar gwele kloz ("The girl of the closed bed", by Bernez Tangi), Y byd newydd (Twm Morys) and Deuit ganin-me ("Come with me", traditional). Korbell cited as her main source of inspiration the songs, often from the Barzaz Breiz, that her mother sang to her.

She wrote using simple words, following the example of Bernez Tangi, who, in addition to a song, wrote the poem that serves as a preface to N'eo ket echu. Because of her training as an actress, she took great care of pronouncing correctly, which is part of her effort in making her songs understandable by the largest audience. She expressed one of her strongest convictions: the importance of Breton, and of languages in general: "I would like the world to keep all the colours that are under the sun", she said in an interview.

She included in the album "Deuit ganin-me", a traditional song that her mother taught her, also sung by the Goadec sisters.

Another traditional theme is the subject of "Son ar plac'h n'he doa netra" (Song of the girl who had nothing), inspired from a nursery rhyme designed to teach children the days of the week, the name of farm animals and the sound they make: every day, the narrator goes to the fair and buys an animal. In Nolwenn Korbell's version, starting on Wednesday, the narrator buys something that cannot be bought: a husband, a son, a heart, a voice and a life. According to the author, "this song is a parable which demonstrates that what makes the salt of life is not negotiable".

The band that performed on N'eo ket echu included Frédérique Lory on the piano, Tangi Le Doré on the bass, and d'Antonin Volson on drums. This team remained with her until 2010.

This album received France 3's Priz (award) of the best CD in 2003 and the Produit en Bretagne (made in Brittany) disc grand award in 2004. In 2004, Nolwenn Korbell received the Imram award, given each year to a Breton language author for his or her whole work.

Her shows were produced by Big Bravo Spectacle, a company based in Saint-Quay-Portrieux. She sang in many events, such as the Vieilles Charrues Festival in 2004, the Festival du bout du monde, the Nuit celtique in Bercy in 2005 and 2006. In 2006, she performed in the Celtic Connections festival in Glasgow and a concert in Olympia with Gilles Servat.

== Albums ==
=== N'eo ket echu ===
2003, Coop Breizh

1. Ur wech e vo
2. Padal
3. Ma c'hemenerez
4. Glav
5. Y byd newydd
6. Son ar plac'h n'he doa netra
7. Luskell ma mab
8. A-dreuz kleuz ha moger
9. Deuit ganin-me
10. Sant ma fardon

=== Bemdez c'houloù ===
2006, Coop Breizh

1. Bemdez choulou
2. Termaji
3. Dal
4. Valsenn Trefrin
5. News from town for my love who stayed home
6. Yannig ha mai
7. Pardon an dreinded
8. Dafydd y Garreg Wen
9. Un petit navire d'Espagne
10. Olole

=== Red ===
(with guitarist Soig Sibéril), 2007, Coop Breizh

1. Bugale Breizh
2. Valsenn trefrin
3. Billy
4. Sant ma fardon
5. Gourin
6. Padal
7. Anna
8. Bemdez choulou
9. Daoulamm ruz
10. Kanaouenn Katell
11. Turn! Turn! Turn!
12. Yannig ha mai
13. Glav
14. News from town for my love who stayed home

=== Noazh ===
2010, Coop Breizh

1. Blues ar Penn Sardin
2. Hir
3. Mad Love
4. Aet Oan
5. An Dud
6. Don't Try
7. Anna
8. Je Voudrais
9. Kuit
10. One More Day
11. Misjac Na Nebi
