= Añjela Duval =

French writer and poet

- Born: Marie-Angèle Duval; April 3, 1905; Le Vieux-Marché, Brittany, France
- Died: November 7, 1981 (aged 76); Lannion, Brittany, France
- Occupations: Writer, poet
- Writing career
- Language: French, Breton

Marie-Angèle Duval (pseudonym Añjela Duval; 3 April 1905 – 7 November 1981) was a Breton writer and poet of Breton literature, best remembered for her works Kan an douar (1973), Traoñ an Dour (1982), Tad-kozh Roperz-Huon (1822-1902) (1982), and Me, Anjela (1986). She was born on 3 April 1905 in Le Vieux-Marché, Brittany, France. She died on 7 November 1981 in Lannion, Breton.

== Biography ==
Añjela Duval was born in 1905 into a family of modest farmers. She grew up as an only child; her older sister, Maia (who is mentioned in some of her poems), and a brother had died before she was born.

She attended the school run by the nuns in the neighboring town of Trégrom until 1917, where she learned to read and write in Breton and French.

She remained single, refusing to marry a sailor she had dated in the 1920s.

She took over her parents’ farm—to which she was very attached—after her father's death in 1941 and her mother's in 1951. She spent her entire life in Traoñ an Dour in Le Vieux-Marché as a farmer.
