= Gwenc'hlan =

Breton druid and bard (6th century)

Gwenc'hlan is the cognomen of a legendary 6th century Breton druid and bard called Kian, the subject and purported author of a Breton song called "Diougan Gwenc'hlan" (Gwenc'hlan's prophecy), published by Hersart de la Villemarqué in his 1839 anthology Barzaz Breiz.

In this song, Gwenc'hlan is imprisoned after having his eyes gouged out for refusing to convert to Christianity, sings out that he isn't afraid to die and makes a prophecy wherein he will be avenged. The motive of the blinded prisoner is reminiscent of the historical fate of Boethius.

One Gwenc'hlan or Guinclaff around 1450 wrote a "chant royal", or "Dialogue between King Arthur and Gwenc'hlan", quoted by Dom Le Pelletier and Gregory of Rostrenen. The poem was rediscovered in 1924. The Breton used by this Gwenc'hlan is already deeply pervaded by French. The legend of the 6th century bard is largely a creation of de la Villemarqué's, but he may have based his account on the 15th century author, as well as on other traditional Breton tales. He quotes 6th to 12th century Welsh poems attributed to the bards Aneurin, Taliesin and Llywarch Hen as his sources.

== Literature ==
- Mary-Ann Constantine Prophecy and Pastiche in the Breton ballads: Groac'h Ahès and Gwenc'hlan, Cambrian Medieval Celtic Studies 30, (Winter, 1995) 87-121.
- Antone Minard, The Dialogue between King Arthur and Gwenc'hlan: a translation in: Comitatus. A journal of medieval and renaissance studies 30 (1999), 167-177.

== See also ==
- Blind musicians
