= Saint-René Taillandier =

French writer and critic (1817–1879)

- Gravure par Tourfaut sur un dessin de Bocourt d’après une photographie d’Ernest Ladrey dans Le Monde illustré du 8 mars 1879.
- Born: 16 December 1817
- Died: 23 February 1879
- Occupations: Writer, literary historian, jurist, philosopher
- Awards: Officer of the Legion of Honor (1870)

Saint-René Taillandier (French pronunciation: [sɛ̃ ʁəne tajɑ̃dje]; 16 December 1817 – 22 February 1879) was a French writer and critic.

== Life ==
Taillandier was born René Gaspard Ernest Taillandier, in Paris. He completed his studies in Heidelberg, and then became professor of literature successively in Strasbourg, Montpellier and at the Sorbonne, where he was nominated to the chair of French eloquence in 1868. Most of the articles included in his published volumes first appeared in the Revue des deux mondes.

In January 1870 he became general secretary of the ministry of education, and continued in this office after the fall of the Empire. He became officer of the Legion of Honour in 1870, and was elected to the Académie Française in 1873. He died in Paris.

== Works ==
His works include Allemagne et Russie, études historiques et litteraires (1856), Le Poète du Caucase, Michel Lermontoff (1856), Maurice de Saxe (2 vols. 1865), Tchèques et Magyars (1869), Le Général Philippe de Ségur (1875).
