= Gilles Servat =

French singer & poet (born 1945)

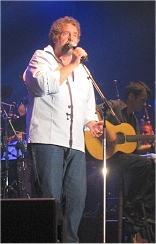
Gilles Servat at Lorient

Gilles Servat is a French singer, born in Tarbes in southern France in 1945, into a family whose roots lay in the Nantes region of Brittany. He is an ardent promoter ardent of the Breton culture, and sings in both French and Breton, as well as the other Celtic languages, and was a member of Dan ar Braz's Héritage des Celtes. He is also a poet and novelist.

== Early life ==
He spent his early childhood and teenage years around Nantes and Cholet, after his father obtains a position of chief of the personnel at the factory Ernault-Batignolles. During this time, he is influenced by Georges Brassens and Léo Ferré, which shows not only on his writing, but furthermore on his way to think and react to events.

After a baccalauréat in literature, he studied sculpture, painting, drawing and engraving at the École régionale des beaux-arts d'Angers, with the goal of becoming a teacher. The rise in popularity of conceptual art made him change his career path. He then spent four years in Angers and two in Paris, where he worked for some months at the ORTF.

He started writing in 1967, to be able to express himself freely and create his repertoire. In may 1968, he discovered the Breton political problems after meeting Serge Bihan, from Groix, and makes a parallel with the struggles a friend from Occitania told him about. In an interview published in the magazine Autrement in 1979, he states that Paris allowed the various communities of regional minorities to meet and create links between themselves. In 1969, he stays on the island of Groix to perform there all summer, which became a key moment in his relationship with Brittany. There, he lived with the working class, reads the book Ar en deulin by Yann-Ber Kalloc'h, understood his roots and decided to sing them. He first met Glenmor while performing at Chez Pouzoulic, the café of the island. The famous bard joined him on stage for a few songs and said "Who said bardism was dead?" afterwards. At the end of summer, he came back to Paris for work, and performed regularly at the café La Ville de Guingamp (in Montparnasse), where he was discovered by the owner of the Ti-Jos who invited him to play there.

For more than two years, he busked by playing every evening at the Ti-Jos, a meeting place for the Bretons living in Paris. It is there that sung La Blanche Hermine for the first time in 1970. Living in Paris made him feel more Breton and he said he discovered his "bretonnitude" there and gave him the inspiration for the song Montparnasse blues. He also began to learn the Breton language with the association Kêr Vreizh. Leaving a career as a civil servant in the PTT administration, he became a professional musician, motivated by the discovery of Alan Stivell. Gilles Servat also joined the Goursez Vreizh. In 1972, He moved to Nantes.

== Career ==
His music evokes the Isle of Groix, off the coast of Morbihan.

His music was originally inspired by the works of Breton musicians Glenmor and Alan Stivell. The title song from his first album, La Blanche Hermine, the White Ermine being the national emblem of Brittany, became an anthem for Bretons.

In the 1990s he became part of the Héritage des Celtes, led by Dan Ar Braz and featuring the most famous names in Celtic music.

In 1998 he released the album "Touche pas à la Blanche Hermine" ("Don't Touch The White Stoat") as a defiant stand against the French National Front who had used Servat's song La blanche Hermine during its meetings.

Servat sings in Breton, French and English.

Servat is also an actor and writer; he has authored several novels inspired by Celtic myths and legends. He is also a campaigner for the Breton language and a supporter of the Skol Diwan Breton language schools.

== Albums ==
- 1970: La Blanche Hermine (The White Ermine)
- 1971: Ki du (Black Dog)
- 1972: L’hirondelle (The Swallow)
- 1974: La liberté brille dans la nuit (Freedom Shines in the Night)
- 1976: Le pouvoir des mots
- 1977: Chantez la vie, l’amour et la mort (Sing to life, love and death)
- 1979: L’or et le cuivre (Gold and Copper)
- 1980: Hommage à René-Guy Cadou (Homage To Rene-Guy Cadou)
- 1981: Gilles Servat en public (Gilles Servat Live)
- 1982: Je ne hurlerai pas avec les loups (I will not howl with the wolves)
- 1985: La douleur d’aimer
- 1988: Mad in sérénité (Mad in Serenity)
- 1992: Le fleuve (The River)
- 1993: L’albatros fou (The Foolish Albertros) with Triskell
- 1994: Les albums de la jeunesse (Albums of Youth)
- 1995: A-raok mont kuit (Before Leaving)
- 1996: Litanies pour l’an 2000 (Litanies for the Year 2000) a compilation album
- 1996: Sur les quais de Dublin (On the Quays of Dublin)
- 1998: Touche pas à la Blanche Hermine (Don't Touch the White Ermine)
- 2000: Comme je voudrai ! (As I wish!)
- 2003: Escales (Stopovers) a 'Best of' album
- 2005: Sous le ciel de cuivre et d'eau (Under the Copper and Water Sky)
- 2006: Sensation [guest artist on the title track of this album by Anúna]
- 2010: Gilles Servat 40 ans de succès best of
- 2011: Ailes et îles (Wings and isles, word play with "She and he")
- 2013: C'est ça qu'on aime vivre avec (That's what we like to live with)

Also features on (among others):

- 1993: Again (Alan Stivell)
- 1994: Dan Ar Braz and The Héritage des Celtes
- 1995: L’Héritage des Celtes en concert
- 1997: L’Héritage des Celtes – Finisterres
- 1998: L’Héritage des Celtes – Zénith
- 1999: Bretagnes à Bercy
