= Paol Keineg =

French writer and poet (born 1944)

Paol Keineg (born February 6, 1944) is a Breton writer and poet born in Quimerc'h (Brittany).

He worked in several places in Brittany as a supervisor before becoming a teacher in Morlaix. He was fired without any official reason in 1972, because of his political activism in the pursuit of autonomy for Brittany. He was one of a group of people who founded the Union démocratique bretonne in 1964. His first book of poetry was published in 1967 and his first play was performed in 1972 : Le Printemps des Bonnets Rouges (The Spring of the Red Bonnets) about an historical revolt in Brittany. It was directed by Jean-Marie Serreau.

In the mid-1970s he moved to California, and in 1977 started a Ph.D. at Brown University, graduating in 1981. He taught French and literature at Dartmouth College, Brown University, and later at Duke University, after being invited to teach at Berkeley and Harvard universities.

In 1975, he created the review called "Bretagnes", published in Morlaix, where were published one of the first poems written by Rita Dove. In 1983, he created the review called "Poésie-Bretagne" (Poetry-Brittany). He writes his books in Breton, French and English languages.

He received the Prix Féneon in 1974. The Prix Max Jacob in 2015 for Mauvaise langues and the prix de poésie Yves Cosson for the totality of his work in 2020.

He is the father of Katell Keineg.

== Books ==
- "Scènes de la vie cachée en Amérique, Les Hauts-Fonds, 2021
- "Korriganiques, (with paintings by Nicolas Fedorenko), éditions Folle avoine, 2019.
- "Johnny Onion descend de son vélo, Les Hauts-Fonds, 2019
- "Un enterrement dans l'île" (in French), translations of Hugh MacDiarmid, Les Hauts Fonds, 2016
- Qui? (in French), translations of R.S. Thomas with Marie-Thérèse Castay and Jean-Yves Le Disez, Les Hauts Fonds, 2015
- Mauvaises langues (in French), Obsidiane, 2014
- Histoires vraies/Mojennoù gwir/Histórias verícas (in Portuguese), translations by Ruy Proença, Dobra Editorial, 2014
- Abalamour (in Breton and French), drawings by François Dilasser, Les Hauts Fonds, 2012
- Les trucs sont démolis (in French), Le Temps qu'il fait/Obsidiane, 2008
- "Wiersze Bretonskie" (in Polish), translations by Kazimierz Brakoniecki, Olsztyn/Centrum Polsko-Francuskie, 2007
- Là et pas là (in French), Le temps qu'il fait/Lettres sur cour, 2005
- Terre lointaine (in French), Éditions Apogée, 2004
- Triste Tristan, suivi de Diglossie, j'y serre mes glosses (in French), Éditions Apogée, 2003
- Anna Zero (in French), Éditions Apogée, 2002
- Dieu et madame Lagadec (in French), Scorff's editions, 2001
- A Cournille (in French), Dana editions, 1999
- Tohu (in English), Wigwam editions, 1995
- Silva return, Maurice Nodeau and Guernica (in English) (Montreal), 1989
- Oiseaux de Bretagne, oiseaux d'Amérique (in French), Obsidiane, 1984
- Préfaces au Gododdin (in French), Bretagnes editions, 1981
- Boudica, Taliesin et autres poèmes (in French), Maurice Nadeau, 1980
- 35 haiku (in Breton), Bretagne editions, 1978
- Lieux communs, suivi de Dahut (in French), Gallimard editions, 1974 (won Prix Fénéon, 1974)
- Histoires vraies/Mojennoù gwir (in French and Breton), P.J. Oswald, 1974
- Le printemps des Bonnets Rouges (in French), P.J. Oswald, 1972
- Chroniques et croquis des villages verrouillés (in French), P.J. Oswald, 1971
- Hommes liges des talus en transes (in French), P.J. Oswald, 1969
- Le poème du pays qui a faim (in French), Traces, 1967, Bretagne editions, 1982

== Plays ==
His plays are all in French.

- Le printemps des Bonnets Rouges, Théâtre de la Tempête, directed by Jean-Marie Serreau, December 1972- January 1973.
- (Manque d')aventures en Pathogénie, France-Culture, directed by Jean Taromi, 1983.
- La Reine de la nuit, Théâtre du Miroir, Châteaulin, Finistère, 1992.
- Kaka, ou l'Entrevue céleste, in La Nuit des naissances, Théâtre de Folle Pensée, Saint-Brieuc, 1994.
- Anna Zéro. Gwengolo (Tombées de la nuit), directed by Michel Jestin, Rennes, 2002.
- Terre lointaine, Théâtre de Folle Pensée, directed by Annie Lucas, Quimper, 2004.

== See also ==
- Breton
