= Jean-François Le Gonidec =

Breton grammarian and translator

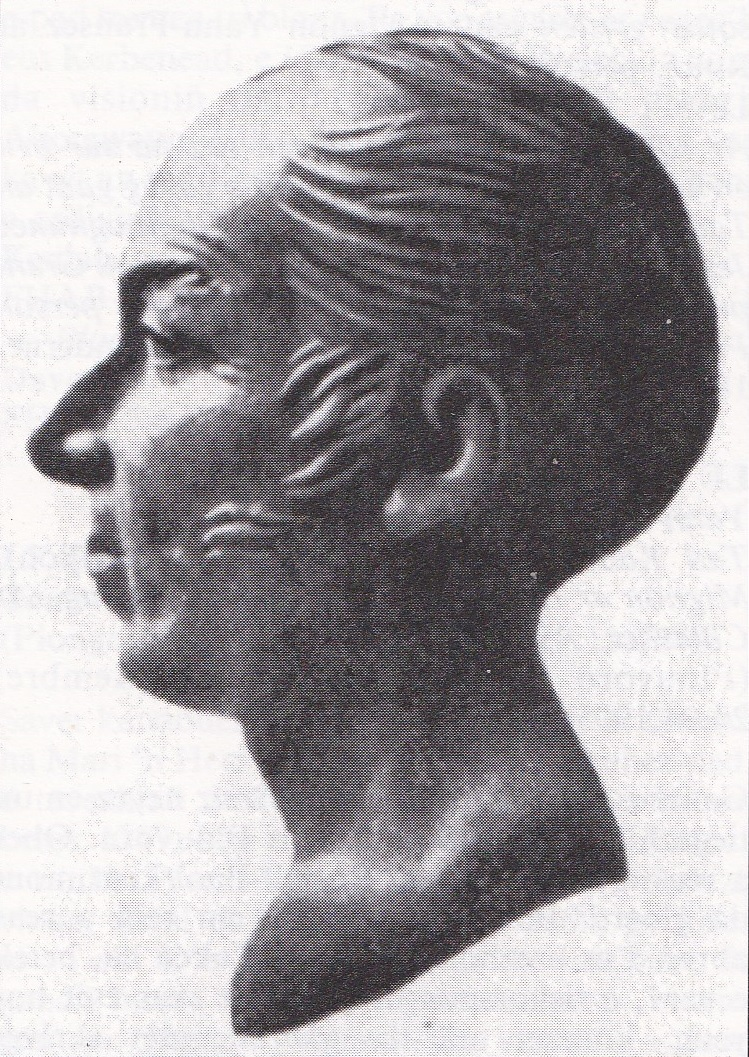

Jean François Marie Le Gonidec de Kerdaniel (Breton: Yann-Frañsez ar Gonideg) (4 September 1775 – 12 October 1838) was a Breton grammarian who codified the Breton language.

He played an important role in the history of his native language by initiating a reform of its orthography, producing an orderly grammar and making the first Breton translation of the New Testament. He is sometimes called "Reizher ar brezhoneg" (Restorer of the Breton language).

== Life ==
Le Gonidec was born in Le Conquet to a family of the petty nobility. He studied in the college at Tréguier from 1787 to 1791. After the French Revolution he participated in the Royalist Catholic uprising known as the Chouannerie. After 1804, he joined Napoleon's Naval administration (Marine de guerre), and was commissioned to administer the forests with a view to manage the production of wood for ship building. He lived in several towns: Paris, Hambourg, Nancy and Moulins, settling in Angoulême where he lived for many years.

He occupied his spare time reforming the orthography of Breton and the codification of its grammar. In 1807, he published a grammaire celto-bretonne (Grammar of Breton Celtic) which sought to delineate the syntactical system of the language. It was the second notable work of its type after Father Julien Maunoir's 1657 grammar published by the Sacré Collège de Jésus. Le Gonidec wished to purify Breton, minimising French loan words used in vernacular speech and clarifying its relationship to its closest living relative Welsh.

He became a member of the short-lived Académie celtique, founded in Paris in 1803, which was soon renamed the Societé des Antiquaires de France. In 1821, he published a Dictionnaire celto-breton. In 1833, he moved to Paris and joined the Compagnie des Assurances générales, founded by a fellow Breton. In 1837, he produced a Dictionnaire français-breton. He died in the following year. The second edition of his Grammaire celto-bretonne was published shortly after his death.

He was buried in Brittany, in the cemetery of Lochrist, near his birthplace of Le Conquet, Finistère. The tomb was erected by Welsh and Breton admirers. It is surmounted by a monument carrying inscriptions in Welsh and French.

== Biblical translations ==
Le Gonidec's greatest ambition was to translate the Bible into Breton, having seen the powerful effect of a Welsh translation in maintaining the Welsh language. Seeking the support of the Catholic Church, in 1821 he published a Katekiz historik (historic Catechism) which was approved.

However he was unable to obtain official Catholic support for his translation of the New Testament. It was only published in 1827 under the auspices of the British and Foreign Bible Society, who had been lobbied to support Le Gonidec by the champion of Welsh language publications, Thomas Price (known as "Carnhuanawc"). The resulting "Protestant" translation was placed on the Index of Banned Books by the Catholic Church.

== Influence ==
The influence of Le Gonidec's work in Brittany was enormous, since his reforms allowed the creation of a "literary" Breton. They were adopted immediately by Théodore Hersart de la Villemarqué (1815–1895) and Auguste Brizeux (1803–1858), whose works, especially the former's Barzaz Breiz, founded modern Breton literature. Several clerical scholars also followed his path.

== Notes ==
- interwiki Breton wp article "Bible" section "Bible in Breton": Ar Bibl e brezhoneg
