= Yann-Ber Kalloc'h =

Breton war poet (1888–1917)

À genoux - lai bretons de Jean-Pierre Calloc'h, 1921

Yann-Ber Kallocʼh (born Jean-Pierre Calloc'h in French; 21 July 1888 – 10 April 1917) was a Breton war poet who wrote in both Breton and French. Similarly to the English poet Wilfred Owen and the Welsh poet Hedd Wyn, Kallocʼh was killed in action during trench warfare while serving as a poilu during World War I. Kallocʼh's death was an equally catastrophic loss to Breton literature.

== Life ==
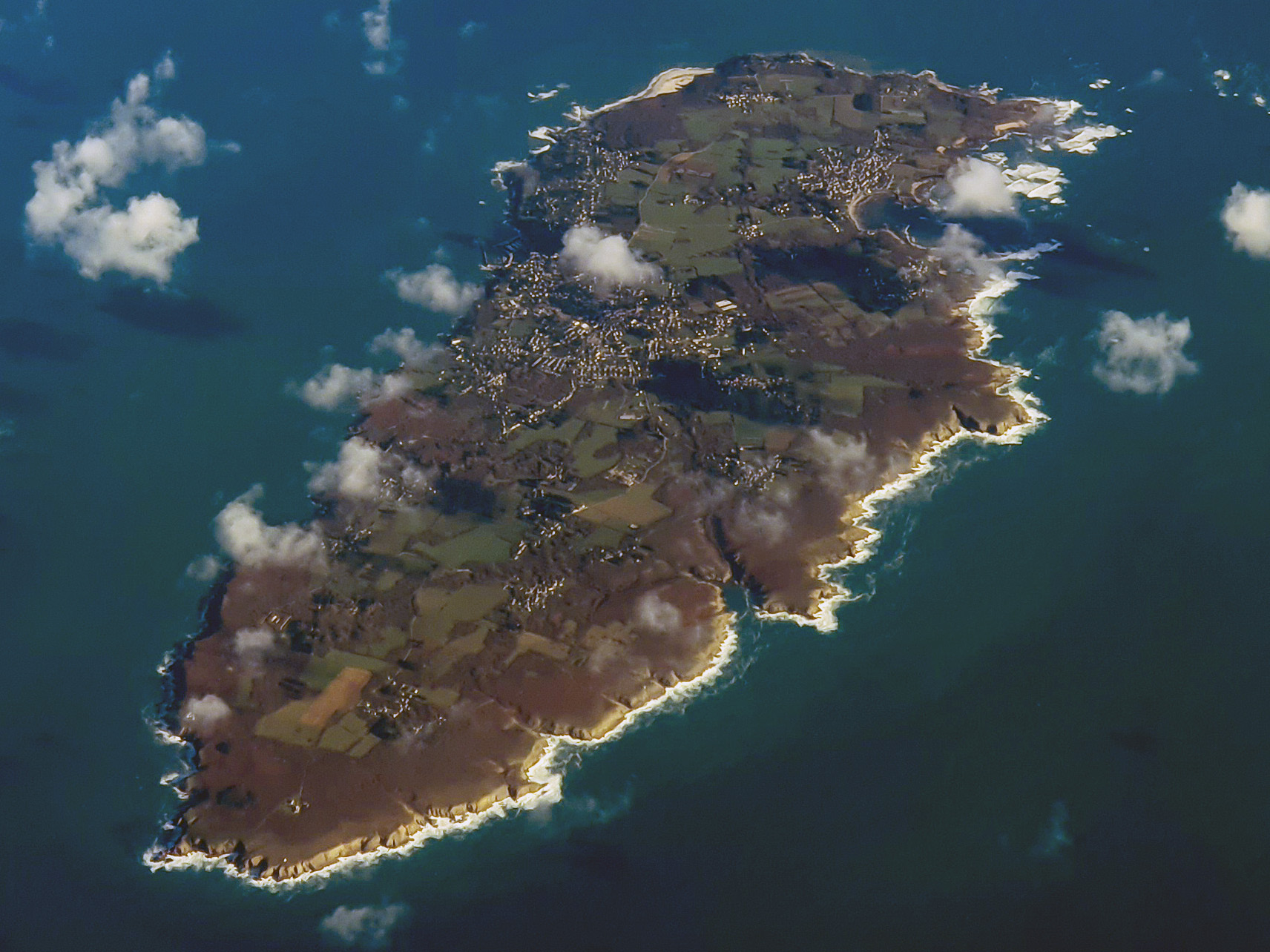
Aerial view of Enez Groe

Yann-Ber Kallocʼh was born on the island of Groix (Breton: Enez Groe), near Lorient (Breton: An Oriant), on July 24, 1888. He was the son of a fisherman (who was lost at sea in October 1902) and his wife. He describes his childhood in the autobiographical poem Me 'zo Ganet kreiz ar e mor (I was born in the middle of the sea), which also praised his native island. Kallocʼh at first wanted to become a Roman Catholic priest and entered the minor seminary of Sainte Anne d'Auray (Breton: Santez-Anna-Wened) in 1900, then the major seminary at Vannes (Breton: Gwened) in October 1905. He was forced to renounce his vocation after his two sisters and his younger brother revealed signs of mental illness, since canon law forbade the priesthood to those who had relatives suffering from such diseases. Yann-Ber had dreamed of being a missionary and his exclusion from the priesthood brought him great distress.

He became a tutor in various cities including Paris. During his compulsory military service, Yann-Ber made a point of teaching fellow Bretons to read and write in their own language. His earliest writings were in French, but from 1905 on, he wrote in the Breton language. Taking the bardic name of Bard Bleimor (lit. "Sea Wolf", or Sea Bass), Kallocʼh wrote for cultural nationalist, pro-Catholic, and pro-devolved government newspapers. He often used to say, "I am not in the least bit French."

At the same time, Kallocʼh's contribution to Breton literature was strengthened by his literacy and fluency in both Breton and French and his ability to mix and draw equally from both literatures and cultures.

Beginning in 1912, Kallocʼh joined fellow Breton intellectuals Iwan en Diberder and Meven Mordiern in coediting the literary journal Brittia, which was intended, "to help incite in the cultivated classes of Brittany an intellectual movement of the first order, authentically indigenous and to make it take shape in the Breton language", as well as, "to contribute to reshaping Brittany into a nation, a Celtic nation."

Brittia accordingly published Diberder's literary translations of stories from Irish mythology, including the legend of the star-crossed lovers Deirdre and Naoise from the Ulster Cycle and The Voyage of Máel Dúin, into the Vannes dialect of the Breton language, but despite his role in founding the magazine, Kallocʼh felt unable to continue his involvement after Diberder began publishing attacks against the Roman Catholic clergy.

At the same time, however, Kallocʼh was one of the ten Breton intellectuals who signed the May 1913 manifesto Aveit Breiz-Vihan / Pour la Bretagne ("For Brittany"). While expressing their fear of an impending European war, the signatories expressed their intention to be loyal to the Third French Republic, while also calling for both a Breton language revival and cultural nationalism. They also called upon their fellow intellectuals from both Lower and Upper Brittany to commit nonviolent resistance to the Republic's continuing ban on Breton medium education and to both study and use Breton as a national language.

According to Ian Higgins, "When the war came, Calloc'h, like so many others, saw it as a defense of civilization and Christianity, and immediately volunteered for the front. Only Ireland and Brittany, he writes in one poem, still help Christ carry the cross: in the fight to reinvigorate Christianity, the Celtic peoples are in the van. In addition, now readily fighting for France, he saw the war as the great chance to affirm the national identity of Brittany and resurrect its language and culture."

On October 12, 1915, he wrote a letter to Achille Collin which became the basis for a 1919 petition in favor of Breton. In the same year, he mailed his war poetry to his friend Pierre Mocaer with instructions to publish the poems in the event that Kallocʼh was to be killed in the war. Of the poems he sent, only the poem Le P'tit Poilu de 1915, was written in French. All others were in the Vannes dialect of Breton. They became the basis for his final poetry collection.

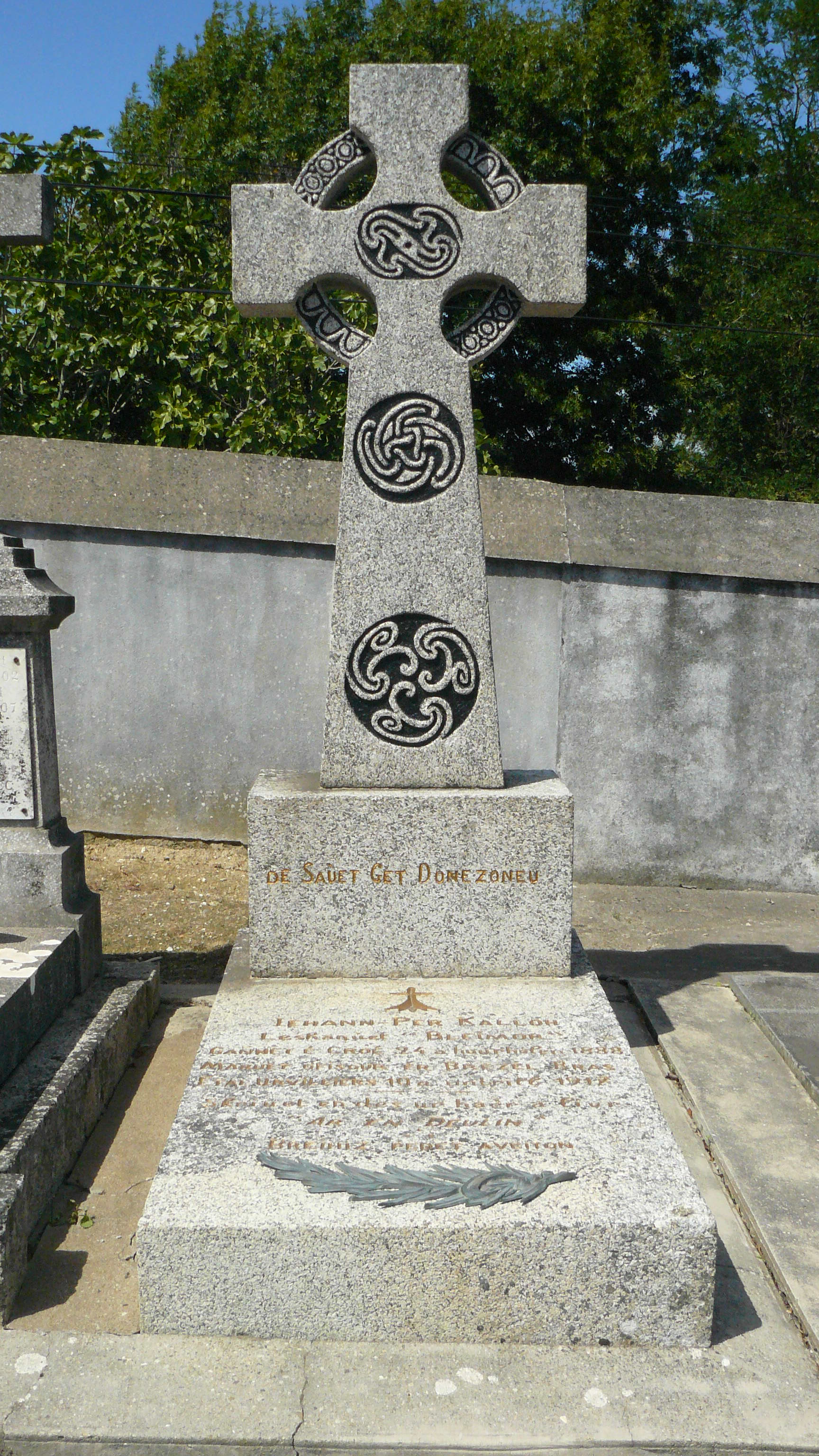
The grave of Yann-Ber Kallocʼh

While serving as a poilu, Yann-Ber Kallocʼh was reportedly a terrible foe to face in the trench warfare of the Western Front, as he wielded a sailor's axe formerly used in the French Navy for boarding enemy ships in hand-to-hand combat. His motto was "For God and Brittany". He was killed in action when a German shell landed near his dugout near Urvillers/Cerizy (Aisne) on April 10, 1917. His body was returned to his native Groix for burial.

== Legacy ==
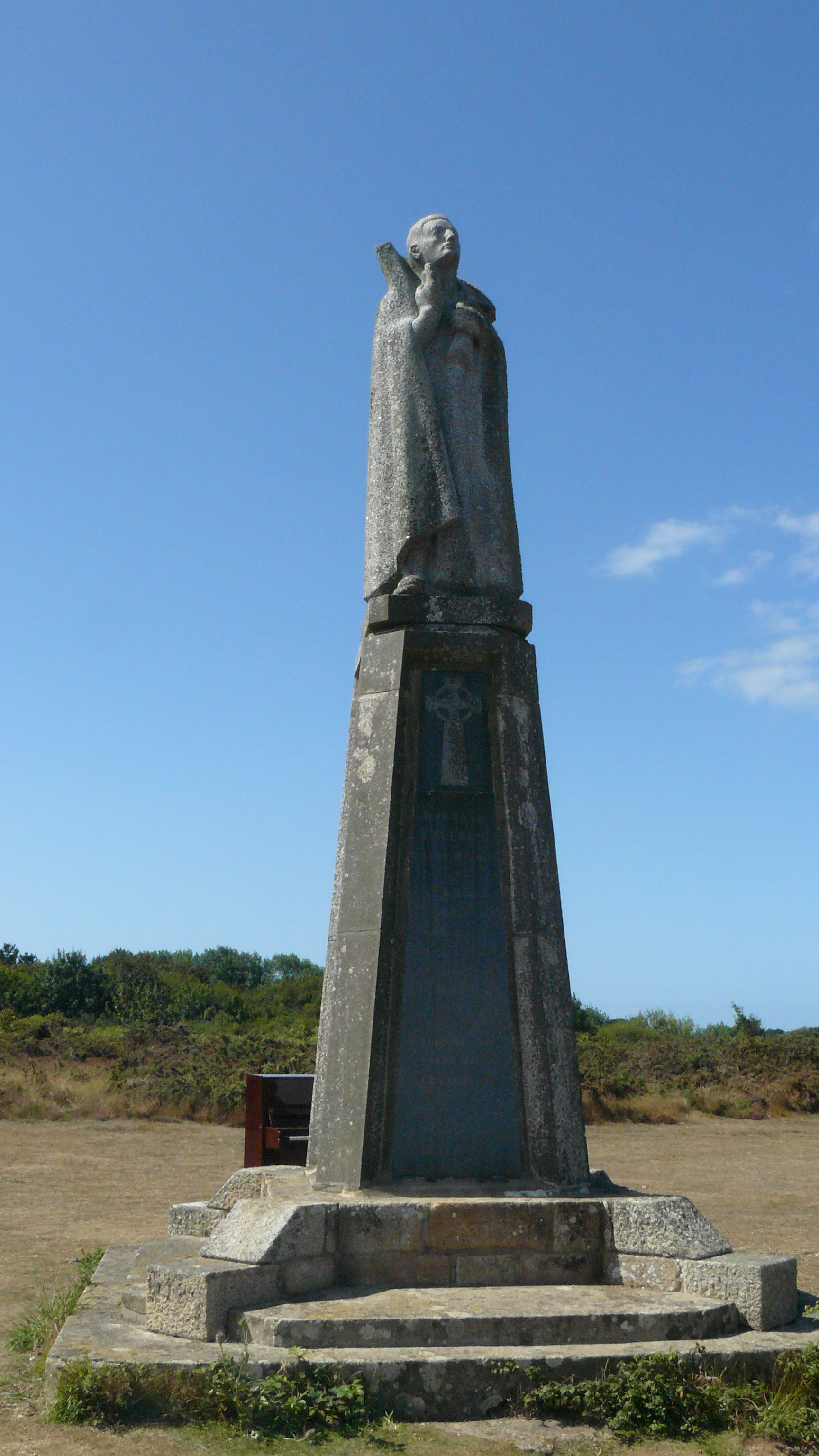
Statue of Yann-Ber Kalloc'h

His name appears in the Panthéon with those of 546 other writers who were killed in the First World War.

The Breton Scouting organization Bleimor is named in his honor and, in Brittany, at least six streets bear his name.

The literary work which reveals Kallocʼh to be one of the greatest figures in Breton literature is his posthumous poetry collection, Ar en deulin (Kneeling), which was published by his friend Pierre Mocaer in 1925. The collection includes the famous poem Me 'zo Ganet kreiz ar e mor (I was born in the middle of the sea).

In these poems composed in large part at the Western Front, he expresses his deep Roman Catholic faith, love of his native language and passionate beliefs in favor of Breton political autonomy.

According to Ian Higgins, "His pre-war poetry is either devotional, militantly Catholic or militantly Breton. These three strands are often spun into one. Calloc'h himself selected what he thought was the best of his work, and gave the manuscript, along with his own French translations of most of the poems. If he were killed, it was to be published, under the title Ar en deulin ("Kneeling"). (The book by L. Paulus contains further texts, including two short stories revealing a touch of humour one would not have expected from the author of Ar en deulin."

According to Jelle Krol, "It is not merely a collection of poems by a major Breton poet: it is a symbol of homage to Yann-Ber Kallocʼh and all those Bretons whose creative powers were cut short by their untimely deaths. Breton literature from the trenches is very rare. Only Yann-Ber Kallocʼh's poems, some war notes written by Auguste Bocher, the memoirs recounted by Ambroise Harel and Loeiz Herrieu's letters addressed to his wife survived the war."

== In popular culture ==
- In her 2009 album Uam, Scottish vocalist and folk singer Julie Fowlis performed Kallocʼh's song Me 'zo Ganet kreiz ar e mor ("I was Born in the Middle of the Sea"). The lyrics were translated from the Breton language to Fowlis' native language of Scottish Gaelic.

== Works ==
- Mem bro (1900)
- Mor du (1900)
- Plaintes (February 1902)
- L'orphelin de la côte (February 1902)
- La dernière parole de Jésus (March 1902)
- Ker-Is (April 1902)
- Les filles de Groix (1902)
- Ar mor (1902)
- La légende de Sainte Catherine (25 November 1904)
- Le prêtre (1904)
- Barde et prêtre (1904)
- Au son de la harpe (1904)
- Hirvoud (1905)
- Dihunamb ! (1905)
- Sant Eugen (12 July 1905)
- Huneeh (1905)
- Kan-Bale er chouanted (1905)
- Au grand outrage (10 March 1906)
- Mon île adorée (1906)
- Er flamanked (1906)
- En neu veuer (1906)
- Gourhemen a houil mat (13 July 1907)
- Kenevo soudard Breih (1907)
- Complainte de M. Noël (1907)
- Gouil mat ! (15 August 1907)
- Nendeleg en harlu (1907)
- Er voraerion (1908)
- Merhed Groai (1908)
- Pardonet d'emb hun Offanseu (1909)
- En eutreu Uzel, person Groé (1695-1717) (1909)
- Étude sur la Boussole Bretonne (1910)
- Au barde-rieur (1911)
- Les tueurs du Breton (1911)
- Ar en deulin (1913, published after World War I)
- Les Pêcheurs Bretons en Mauritanie
- Les P'tits Poilus de 1915 (1915)
