= Ankou =

Servant of death in Breton folklore

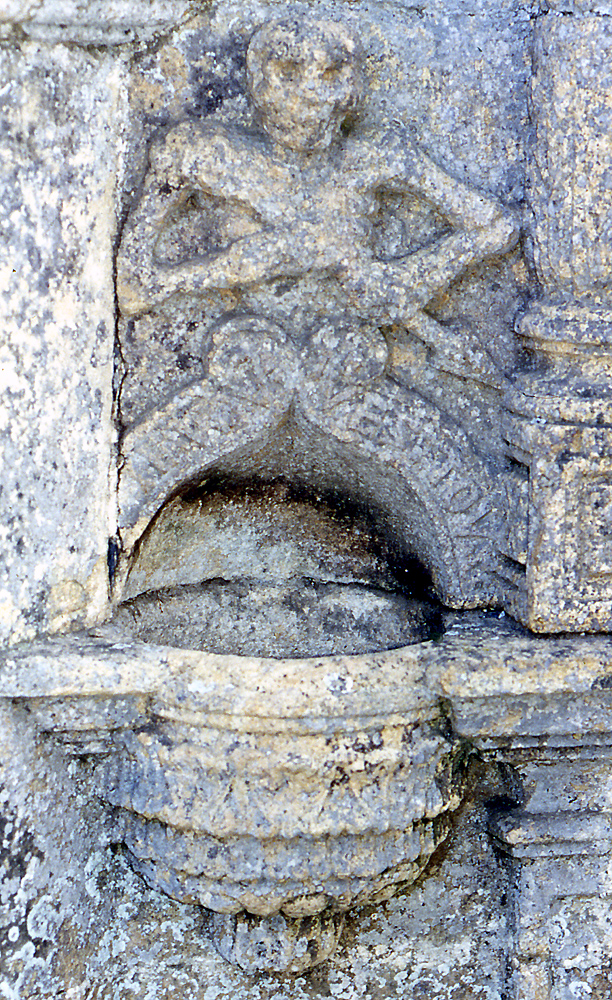
Ankou in La Roche-Maurice, Finistère

Ankou (Breton: /ɑːnkuː/ an Ankoù) is a servant of death in Breton, Cornish (an Ankow in Cornish), and Welsh (yr Angau in Welsh) mythology.

== Background ==
Ankou appears as a man or skeleton wearing a black robe and a large hat that conceals his face, or, on occasion, simply as a shadow. He wields a scythe and is said to sit atop a cart for collecting the dead, or to drive a large, black coach pulled by four black horses and accompanied by two ghostly figures on foot.

Central to Breton folk belief is the Ankou, a personification of death often depicted as a skeletal figure driving a creaking cart (karrig an Ankou). Rather than a static myth, the Ankou was viewed as a rotating role filled by the last person to die in a parish each year. Additionally, the lavandières de la nuit (night washerwomen) represent a distinct class of supernatural beings in Breton lore; these spirits are typically encountered at moonlit fountains or streams, where they are said to wash the shrouds of those about to die.

According to one legend, he was the first child of Adam and Eve. Other versions depict Ankou as the first dead person of the year (though he is always depicted as a male adult), charged with collecting others' souls before he can go to the afterlife. In an alternate origin, he was a cruel prince who met Death during a hunting trip and challenged him to see who could kill a black stag first. Death won the contest and the prince was cursed to roam the Earth as a ghoul for all eternity. Sometimes he is depicted as the king of the dead whose subjects have their own particular paths, along which their sacred processions move.

Ankou is mentioned by Anatole Le Braz, a writer and collector of legends, in The Legend of Death:

The Ankou is the henchman of Death (oberour ar maro) and he is also known as the grave yard watcher, they said that he protects the graveyard and the souls around it for some unknown reason and he collects the lost souls on his land. The last dead of the year, in each parish, becomes the Ankou of his parish for all of the following year. When there has been, in a year, more deaths than usual, one says about the Ankou:
– War ma fé, heman zo eun Anko drouk. ("On my faith, this one is a nasty Ankou.")

== Appearance in subcultures ==
Every parish in Brittany is said to have its own Ankou. In Breton tradition, the squealing of railway wheels outside one's home is supposed to be Karrigell an Ankou ("The Wheelbarrow of Ankou"). Similarly, the cry of the owl is referred to as Labous an Ankou ("The Death Bird"). The Ankou is also found on the baptismal font at La Martyre where he is shown holding a human head.

== See also ==
- Arawn, a Welsh king of the Otherworld
- Death (personification)
- Hook Man
