= Erwan Evenou =

French writer (1940–2020)

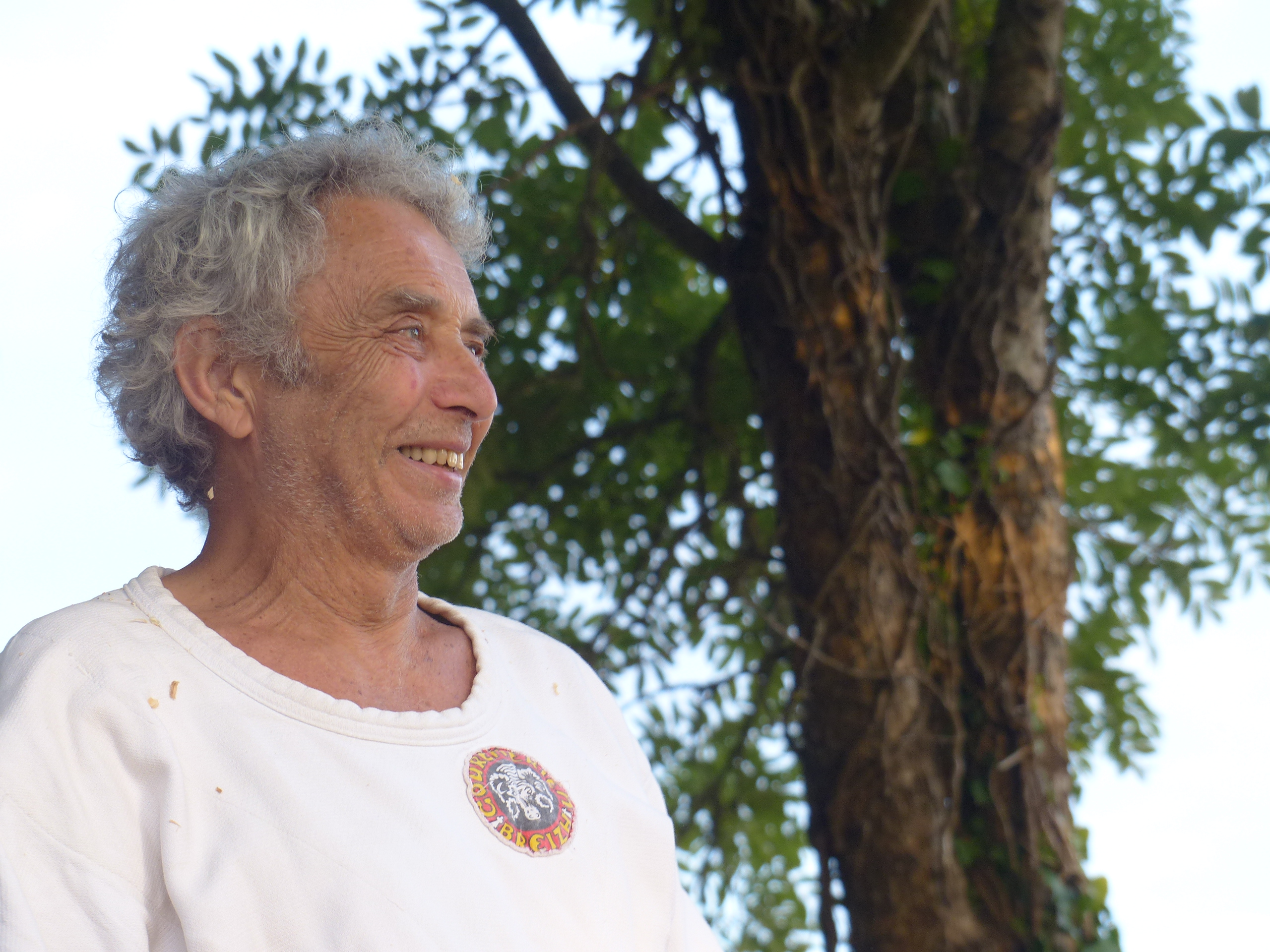
- Born: 14 February 1940; Algiers, French Algeria
- Died: 25 April 2020 (aged 80)
- Occupation: Writer

Erwan Evenou (14 February 1940 – 25 April 2020) was a French writer, linguist, poet, political activist, and teacher. He was a strong advocate for the Breton language. He was a recipient of the Ordre des Palmes académiques for his work.

He ran as the Breton Democratic Union (UDB) candidate for Morbihan in the 1973 French legislative election, but was defeated. He was active in the Syndicat national des instituteurs, and carried out militant activity in Brittany. He wrote numerous articles for Al Liamm and Le Peuple breton as a Breton language correspondent for the UBD. He was secretary general of "Galv", a progressive action committee for the Breton language. He wrote numerous poems and a novel.

== Publications ==
- 'Benn Gouloù Deiz (1972)
- Description phonologique du Breton de Lanvénégen (1987)
- Nikolazig ar broioù tomm (1991)
- La langue bretonne en quête de légitimité dans l'éducation et la vie publique (2000)
