= Héritage des Celtes =

L'Héritage des Celtes
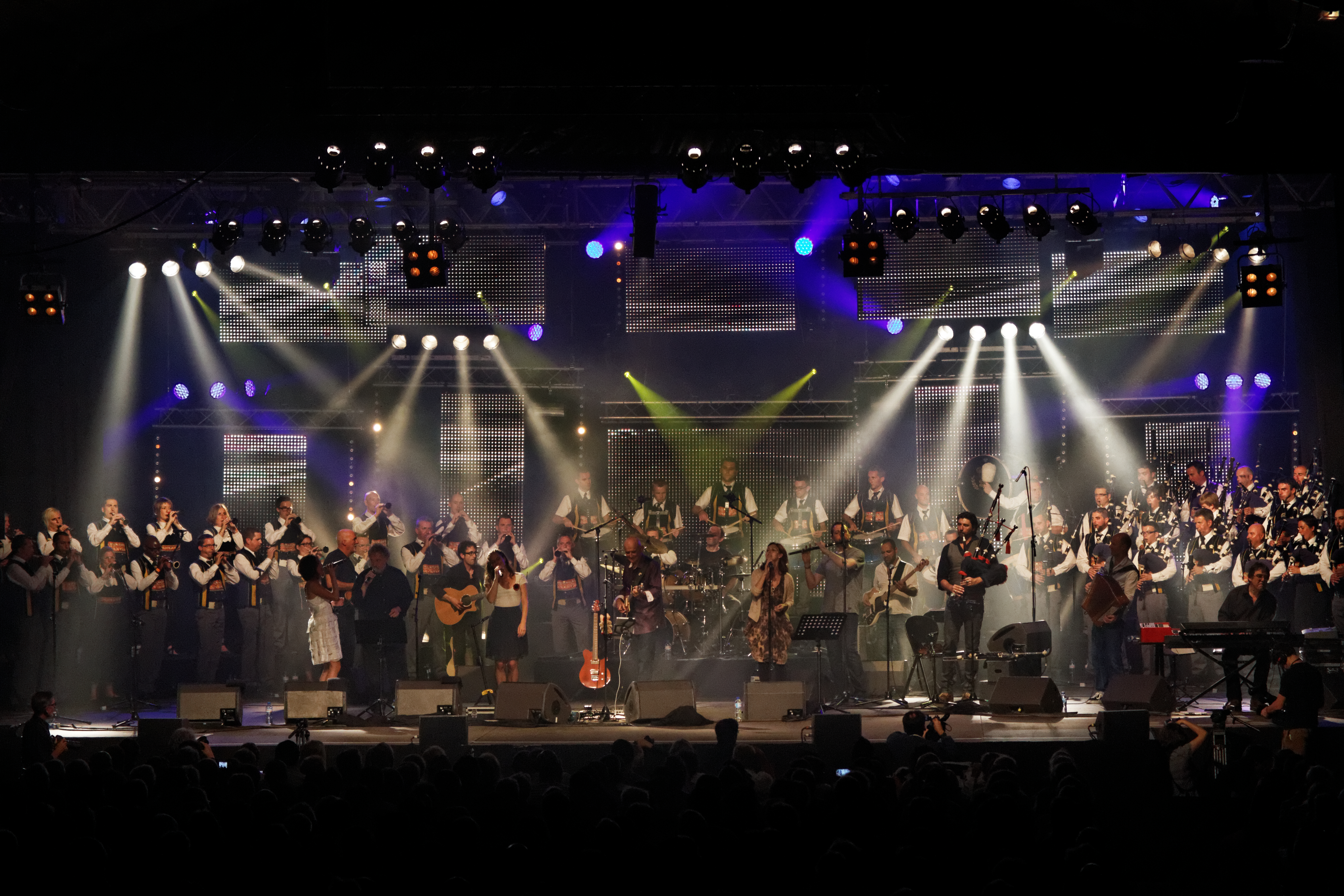
- 20 years of the creation of the Héritage des Celtes at Quimper, 2013

Background information
- Origin: Quimper, Brittany
- Genres: Celtic music, celtic rock, folk rock
- Years active: 1993–2000
- Labels: Sony Music Entertainment

L'Héritage des Celtes (The Celts Heritage) is a 50-piece Pan-Celt band with musicians from Celtic nations, started by two Bretons in the town of Quimper – the producer Jacques Bernard and the guitarist Dan Ar Braz. It started as a gathering of friends to celebrate the 70th anniversary of Festival de Cornouaille in 1993. The adventure surpassed all expectations: 2.5 million albums sold, thousands of spectators in biggest stages of France (Bercy, Zéniths, stadiums, festivals) and two Victoires de la Musique awards in 1996 and 1998 (best album of traditional music). Their fame within France was so great that in 1996 they represented France in the 41st Eurovision Song Contest. In August 2000 the group played at the Festival Interceltique in Lorient where Dan Ar Braz announced that it would be the final concert.

== Discography ==
- Héritage des Celtes (1994)
- En concert Live (1995)
- Finisterres (1997)
- Zenith (1998)
- Bretagnes à Bercy (1999) (various artists)
- Nuit Celtique au Stade de France (2002) (various artists)
