= Loeiz Herrieu =

French writer, poet, and historian (1879–1953)

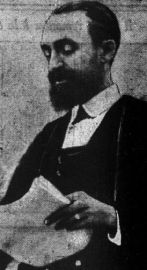
Loeiz Herrieu -1939

Loeiz Herrieu or Louis Henrio (27 January 1879 in Lanester, then in Caudan – 22 May 1953 in Auray) was a Breton historian who wrote in his native language of Breton vannetais or Gwened-dialect Dihunamb. The son of a farmer, he was nicknamed Er Barh Labourér ("the peasant bard"). He wrote poetry and prose and also collected. He is best known for his World War I memoir.
