= List of Breton writers =

This list shows some authors from Brittany.

== A ==
- Albert Le Grand
- Bertrand d'Argentré
- Guy Autret de Missirien
- Octave-Louis Aubert

== B ==
- Erwan Berthou
- Gwilherm Berthou
- Theodore Botrel
- Anatole Le Braz
- Yann Brekilien
- Fañch Broudig

== C ==
- François-René de Chateaubriand
- Tristan Corbière, French language poet
- Jeanne Coroller-Danio

== C'H ==
- Reun ar C'halan, also known as René Galand

== D ==
- Emile Danoën
- François Debeauvais
- Jean-Marie Déguignet
- Pêr Denez, Breton language novelist
- Youenn Drezen
- Jean Dupuis (En Neue)

== E ==
- Fañch Eliès better known as Abeozen

== F ==
- François Falc'hun

== G ==
- René Galand
- Xavier Grall
- Jules Gros
- Eugène Guillevic
- Louis Guilloux
- Youenn Gwernig, Breton language poet

== H ==
- Per Jakez Helias, Breton language poet
- Roparz Hemon, Breton language poet
- Loeiz Herrieu
- Théodore Hersart de la Villemarqué (Kervarker)

== J ==
- Alfred Jarry
- Job Jaffré
- François Jaffrennou
- Gerard Jaffrès

== K ==
- Yann-Ber Kalloc'h
- Corentin Louis Kervran

== L ==
- Célestin Lainé (Neven an Henaff)
- Yves Lainé
- Xavier de Langlais (Langleiz)
- Pierre Le Baud
- Morvan Lebesque
- Charles Le Goffic
- Camille Le Mercier d'Erm
- François-Marie Luzel

== M ==
- Emile Masson
- Olier Mordrel
- Françoise Morvan

== P ==
- Jean-Marie Perrot

== Q ==
- Henri Queffélec
- Yann Queffélec

== R ==
- Ernest Renan
- Armand Robin
- Guy Ropartz
- Louis Napoleon Le Roux

== S ==
- Guillaume de Saint-André
- Victor Segalen

== T ==
- Louis Tiercelin

== V ==
- Erwan Vallerie
- Jules Verne

== External links (in French) ==
- Bibliographie de Bretagne, ouvrages littéraires et autres.
- Institut culturel de Bretagne, section littérature.
