= Al Liamm =

Breton magazine

Al Liamm (Breton for "The Link") is a bimonthly magazine of culture and literature in the Breton language.

== History ==
The first issue of Al Liamm was published in 1946. The initial magazine was created in Paris by Pêr ar Bihan and Andrev Latimier, and then merged with two other cultural magazines, Kened, and then Tír na nÓg, in 1948. Ronan Huon, who was, along with Pol Le Gourrierec, the editor of Tír na nÓg, took charge of the fusion. He directed the resulting magazine, Al Liamm-Tir na nÓg, for about half a century. One of his sons, Tudual Huon, has taken his place at the head of the magazine. In 2013, the magazine had 600 subscribers and a circulation of 700.

== Profile ==
Every issue offers a selection of short stories, poetry and literary essays entirely in Breton. Numerous authors of modern Breton literature, such as Abeozen, Per Denez, Youenn Drezen, Xavier de Langlais (Langleiz), Anjela Duval, Reun Ar C'halan, Maodez Glanndour, Youenn Gwernig, Roparz Hemon, Ronan Huon, Paol Keineg, Kerverzioù, Meavenn, Youenn Olier, and Yann-Ber Piriou have made contributions to the magazine with poems, short stories, essays, and studies. Breton poets and singers who were directly involved in the revival of the music of Brittany, such as Milig ar Skañv (Glenmor), Youenn Gwernig, or Bernez Tangi, have also published poems and songs in Al Liamm.

As emphasised by Welsh author and editor Meic Stephens, Al Liamm is "the principal platform for just about every Breton writer of note to emerge during the post-war period". Poems from Al Liamm authors have often been put to music and songs by Breton singers, such as Véronique Autret, Nolwenn Leroy, Yann-Fañch Kemener, Gilles Servat and Alan Stivell. The close relationships between modern celtic nations and the various branches of celtic literature have also led to contributions from Welsh and Irish authors, and to Breton translations from Welsh literature and Gaelic literature (Thomas Gwynn Jones, Sorley MacLean, Seán Ó Ríordáin, and Kate Roberts).

== Al Liamm publishing company ==
The Al Liamm publishing company, associated with the magazine, has published numerous novels and memoirs:

- Emgann Kergidu, by Lan Inisan
- Tristan hag Izold, by Xavier de Langlais (Langleiz)
- E skeud tour bras Sant Jermen, by Yeun ar Gow
- Skol-Louarn Veig Trebern, by Youenn Drezen (foreword by Pêr-Jakez Helias)
- An Teirgwern Pembroke, by Jarl Priel
- Pirchirin Kala-Goañv, by Abeozen
- Plac'hed o lêr rous, by Yann Gerven

as well as plays, by Tanguy Malmanche and by Roparz Hemon, and collections of poetry, by Anjela Duval and by Youenn Gwernig.

== Further reading and listening ==
- William Calin, "Minority literatures and modernism: Scots, Breton and Occitan, 1920-1990", University of Toronto Press, 2000, ISBN 9780802083654.
- Georges Cadiou, "Emsav, dictionnaire critique, historique et biographique : le mouvement breton de A à Z", Coop Breizh, mars 2013, ISBN 2843465745.
- Francis Favereau, "Anthologie de la littérature bretonne au XXe siècle : 1945-1968", "Tome 3 : La littérature d'esprit national : Al liamm Tír na nÓg / Dans le sillage de la Résistance : Brud et Brud nevez", Skol Vreizh, 2008, ISBN 978-2-915623-41-3.
- John T. Koch, "Celtic culture: a historical encyclopedia", ABC-CLIO, 2006, ISBN 978-1-85109-440-0.
- Bernard Le Nail et Jacqueline Le Nail, "Dictionnaire des romanciers de Bretagne", Keltia Graphic éditions, 1999, ISBN 2-913953-01-8.
- Alan Stivell, "Trema 'n inis", Keltia III / Phonogram, 1976.
