= Lainé =

Lainé is a French surname. Notable people with the surname include:

- Célestin Lainé (1908–1983), Breton nationalist and collaborator during the Second World War
- Elie Lainé (1829–1911), French landscape architect
- Fabien Lainé (born 1976), French politician
- Joseph Lainé (1768–1835), French lawyer and politician
- Juan Lainé Desombres (1884–1977), Mexican real estate agent, and World Scout Committee member
- Pascal Lainé (1942–2024), French academic, novelist, and writer
- Samyr Lainé (born 1984), Haitian-American triple jumper
- Sylvie Lainé (born 1957), French science-fiction writer
- Yves Lainé (born 1937), Breton lawyer, politician and companies executive manager, and a writer
