= Breton Americans =

Americans of Breton birth or descent

Américains bretons (French) Amerikaned Vreton (Breton)

Total population
- 338

Languages
- American English · French · Breton

Religion
- Predominantly Roman Catholicism, Protestantism

Related ethnic groups
- British Americans (Cornish Americans · English Americans · Welsh Americans · Irish Americans · Manx Americans · Scottish Americans · Scotch-Irish Americans · other Celtic Americans) · French Americans · Breton Canadians

Breton Americans (French: Américains bretons; Breton: Amerikaned Vreton) are Americans of Breton descent from Brittany. An estimated 100,000 Bretons emigrated from Brittany to the United States between 1880 and 1980.

== History ==
A large wave of Breton immigrants arrived in the New York City area during the 1950s and 1960s. Many settled in the East Elmhurst neighborhood of Queens. However, more than 10,000 Bretons left their native land to emigrate to New York.

There is also a Breton soccer team in Queens.

== Notable people ==
- John James Audubon
- Celine Dion
- René Galand
- Charles Guillou
- Youenn Gwernig
- Paol Keineg
- Jack Kerouac
- Yann LeCun
- Jackie Stallone
- Sylvester Stallone
- Tina Weymouth

== See also ==
- Breton soccer teams in New York
