= Breton soccer teams in New York =

Stade Brestois NY
- Full name: Stade Brestois New York
- Nickname: Gwenn ha Ruz
- Founded: 2011
- Ground: Sara Delano Roosevelt Park
- Chairman: Charles Kergaravat
- Manager: Charles Kergaravat
- League: Urban Soccer
- 2012: semi-final
- Website: http://www.bzh-ny.org/
Home colors

Stade Brestois New York is a soccer team gathering and made up of members of the Breton community in New York City. Organized by the BZH New York association, it was formerly called the Merlus de New York, until some players merged into the new team in 2011-2012. Sponsored by the professional French team Stade Brestois 29, the team plays seven a side by opposition to the eleven a side team of Stade Breton. The former and the latter are two teams playing at two levels.

== The historic soccer club: Stade Breton ==
Starting from 1955 after the creation of Stade Breton, soccer gained popularity amongst Breton migrants in New York throughout the 20th century. The club featured many skillful players, especially from Celtic Brittany, and played at the top level of the State of New York, in the Eastern District Soccer League.

== Decline of Stade Breton and growth of BZH New York ==
However, from the beginning of the 21st century, Stade Breton's soccer team started getting worse in terms of results. Some of their players left the team to play with teams of newly-immigrating communities, like Africans, and in the meantime, they did not succeed anymore in the New York cup (a competition Stade Breton won several times in the past), being severely defeated in some matches.

Besides, Stade Breton's historical sponsor, the restaurant Tout Va Bien in Manhattan, decided to withdraw and broke the historic partnership with the team. Actually, the 2011/12 EDSL Open Division season was the last one played by Stade Breton.

The last great achievement of Stade Breton was on June 7, 2009 in State Cup Final, when they tied 1-1 and lost in the penalty kicks against a Portuguese team, despite a goal scored by the Alsatian Thierry Kranzer. By contrast, the soccer section of BZH New York, a Breton cultural association in NY created in 2006, developed partnerships with professional teams located in Brittany.

In August 2008, BZH New York's president, Laurent Corbel, meets with the FC Lorient (aka Les Merlus) and signed a sponsorship agreement with the French club. Named Merlus de New York to match its sponsor's nickname, this was the first Breton team in New York apart from Stade Breton.

After FC Lorient's sponsorship, Stade Brestois NY was created in September 2011 from a partnership between BZH New York and another French Ligue 1 team, Stade Brestois 29. Stade Brestois NY, composed of Bretons and friends of Brittany, competed in soccer leagues within NYC.

Therefore, in May 2012, whereas Stade Breton was on the verge of extinction, its soccer team was taken over by BZH New York, the cultural association of the Breton people settled in New York. Players from both Stade Breton and BZH New York's soccer section started playing in the same team in the Spring 2012 under the name of Stade Brestois New York.

== New York as backdrop ==
In New York, a megalopolis with a mix of nationalities, Bretons also celebrate their culture with BZH New York with thousands of members. The members come together regularly to share their origins, music and culture.

The BZH NY, consisting mostly of Bretons of New York, was founded in 2006. Their president Charles Kergaravat, a Breton American, created the Stade Brestois New York, saying "Sport is a unifying element between people, a way to meet, to talk and to build bridges between our cultures. We are always in association with the Irish Networks in New York".

== Stade Brestois vs. Irish Network New York rivalry ==
An ethnic and cultural relationship between Irish people and Bretons is the reason the soccer teams of both associations in the city playing against each other has turned into something like the match of the year for many.

On November 13, 2009, in prelude of the World Cup Qualifier France vs. Ireland, the Merlus of New York played against an Irish team in the city. Following this friendly match, everybody went to watch the qualifier game at Tout Va Bien. The next year, on November 20, 2010, the Merlus de NY once again faced their Celtic counterparts.

On December 11, 2011 the first match with the team as Stade Brestois NY took place, and the team engineered a come-from-behind victory in the annual Celtic Cup. Down 3-1 against the Irish Network NY with three minutes remaining, the Bretons scored three unanswered goals to once again have bragging rights in the Celtic diaspora. An post-match lunch was organized to raise funds for soccer instruction for children in Harlem, New York.

On February 25, 2012, Stade Brestois NY season restarted during a Charity Shield tournament. The team tried to dust off some of its winter rust accumulated over the cold months. The BZH NY Super Cup featured four local teams, some having international links. Stade Brestois NY (Brittany), Irish Network NY (Ireland), Flanders House Team NY (Flanders), and Red Bull supporters all competed on a chilly February evening. The contested tournament was won by the spirited Irish team. On November 17, 2012, in the NYC Celtic Cup 2012, Stade Brestois NY retook their bragging rights by defeating Irish Network NY (7-3) in the hotly anticipated match of the year for the Celtic cousins.

== Championships and exhibition tournaments ==
Usually, Breton teams have taken part in the three following official championships.

YMCA Long Island Championship (LIC) from 2012

Urban Soccer (with the team nicknamed Les Merlus de New York from 2008 to 2011)

In this competition, on August 11, 2010, Les Merlus de NY made it to the final only to lose on overtime penalty kicks. Moreover, the semi-final stage was reached in August 2012 under the name of Stade Brestois NY

Eastern District Soccer League (during Stade Breton's era)

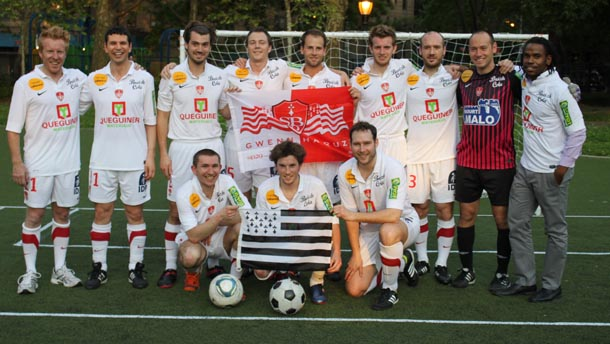
The starting eleven in late 2012 (Long Island City YMCA)

Meanwhile, Breton soccer players also participated in a couple of exhibition encounters against the French Navy in the Merlus de NY period as well as in the Stade Brestois NY era. Les Merlus de New York played the sailors of the French Navy Ship La Jeanne d'Arc on April 3, 2010. In May 2012, a friendly match against French Navy ship La Belle Poule was also organized.

In November 2012 the New York Cosmos set up a fundraising tournament, the Sandy Cup 2012, in which ten teams participated. Stade Brestois NY was defeated in quarter-finals, then played a friendly game against L'Union Alsatienne, a team set up by another French community.

== Stade Breton revival ==
From the 2013/14 season, Stade Breton New York has organized a team again to compete in the EDSL league. The best Breton players in New York participate in this new team, sponsored by Jean Pierre Touchard, owner of the Upper West Side Breton restaurant Tout Va Bien. Apart from Stade Brestois NY playing six-a-side soccer, Stade Breton is nowadays the only Breton soccer team playing eleven-a-side in the Greater New York area.

== Beyond soccer: Petanque section ==
BZH NY and Le Stade Breton are not only sport and cultural associations with a soccer structure but also a way for Bretons to participate in numerous petanque competitions. Most of these Breton petanque players immigrated in the 1950s and '60s. Working mainly in the restaurant business, they still form a tight-knit community, with many living relatively close to Bryant Park. For them, petanque is an opportunity to be social, to get out to meet and spend time with their compatriots, which is very similar to the way the sport is played in France.

Before Bryant Park reopened, many Bretons and other French played in Central Park. Some players practiced petanque in France before coming to the US, but many of them discovered the game during the '60s in New York City, in the alleys where games went on every weekday, or during Le Stade Breton's annual picnics. Some Breton restaurants on the West Side, like Tout Va Bien and Sans Culottes Sports, were dedicated to petanque as well as soccer.

Nowadays, there is no specific area for petanque in Central Park, but players are generally tolerated by the authorities. They play on free ground, as petanque enthusiasts love to do. In 1974, the first big La Boule New Yorkaise contest was held, attracting ninety players from Quebec. Players have now settled at the current location on the horse-riding alley just behind Tavern on the Green. This southwest area of Central Park is close to a former French residential neighborhood. Before the 1990s, many in the French community (particularly Breton) lived on the West Side.
