= Melaine Favennec =

French singer-songwriter (1950–2026)

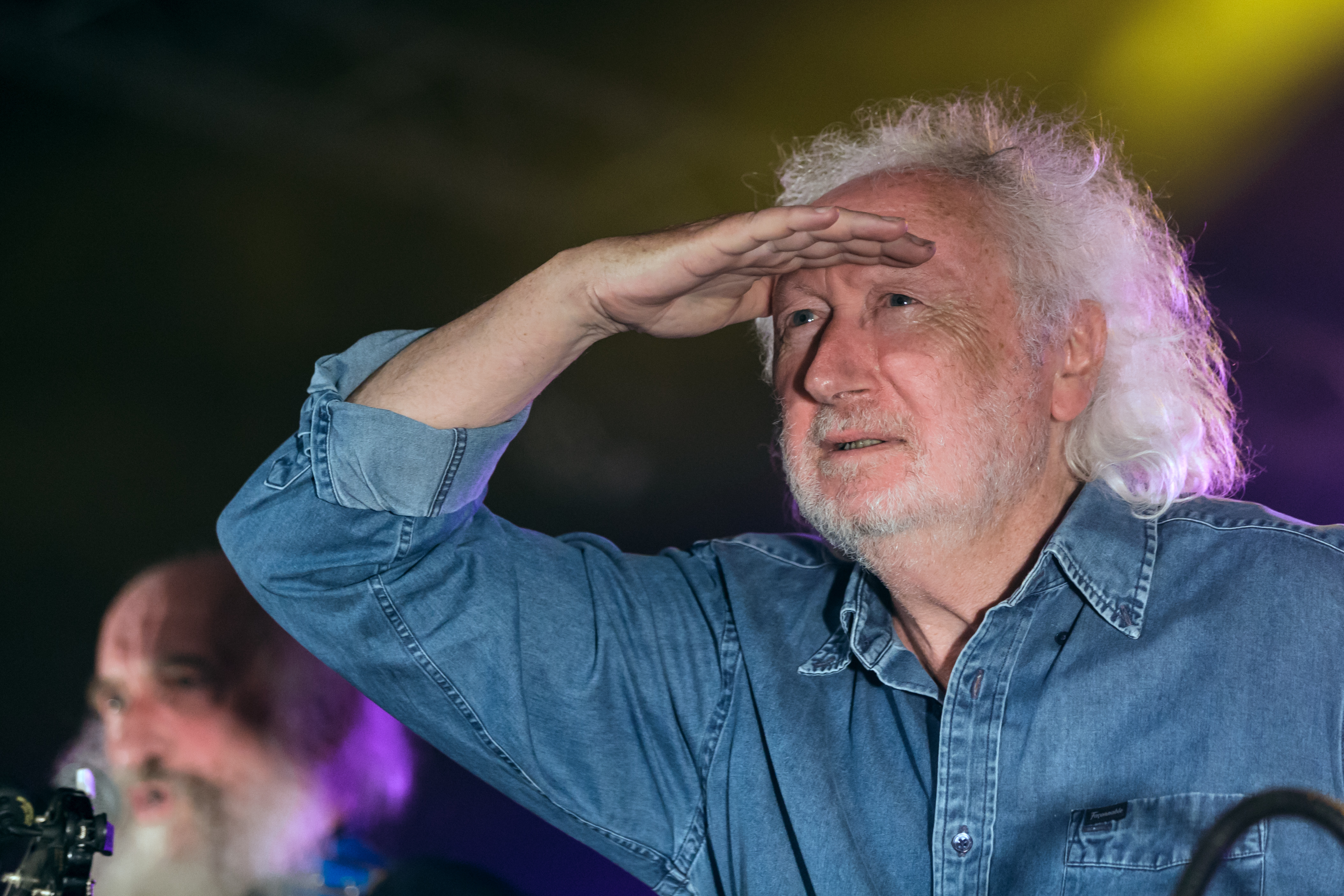
- Favennec in 2016
- Born: 1950; Quimperlé, France
- Died: 13 July 2026 (aged 75); Pont-l'Abbé, France
- Occupation: Singer-songwriter

Melaine Favennec (French: [məlˈɛn favɛnˈɛk]; 1950 – 13 July 2026) was a French singer-songwriter.

== Life and career ==
Born in Quimperlé in 1950, Favennec was the son of Bagad Bro Kemperle co-founder Robert Favennec. Growing up, he was close to his father's friends, Polig Monjarret and Youenn Gwernig. He received inspiration from the Celtic sound of "Gates of Eden" by Bob Dylan. He signed with RCA Records in 1982 for the release of his album Au secret déluge and went on tour amidst the musical changes of the 1980s. In 1999, he joined the Trio EDF alongside Patrik Ewen and Gérard Delahaye. His final solo album, 2012's Émoi des mots, contained recordings of Le Cornet à dés, a collection of poems by Max Jacob.

Favennec died in Pont-l'Abbé on 13 July 2026, at the age of 75.

== Discography ==
=== Solo ===
- Basse danse (1976)
- Petit garçon chante chante (1977)
- Chansons simples et chants de longue haleine (1979)
- Au secret déluge (1982)
- Melaine - Masculin singulier (1988)
- La Chambre (1990)
- Présent d'exil (1993)
- Nos îles, nos amours (1999)
- Hey Ho ! (2005)
- Émoi des mots (2012)

=== With Trio EDF ===
- Kan Tri (2003)
- Salut les vieux frères ! (2004)
- Tri Men (2007)
- Kan Tri Men (2011)
- Route 66 (2014)
- Route 29 (2016)
