= Bretons =

Celtic ethnic group

Bretons Bretons (French) Bretoned or Breizhiz (Breton)
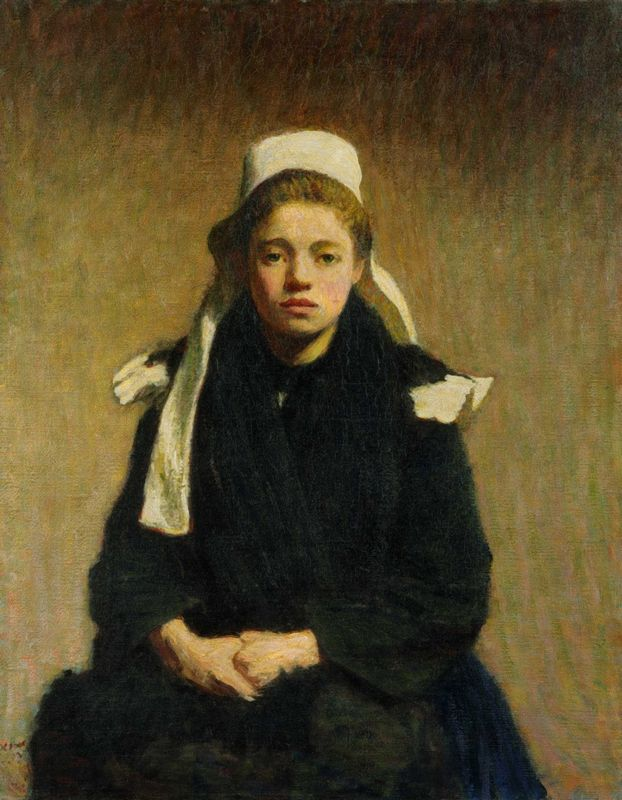
- Une Jeune Bretonne ("A young Breton woman"), painting by Roderic O'Conor

Total population
- c. 7–8 million

Regions with significant populations
- France: 6–7 million
- Brittany (administrative region): 3,318,904 (Note: Legal population of the administrative region of Brittany in 2017)
- Loire-Atlantique: 1,394,909 (Note: Legal population of Loire-Atlantique in 2017)
- Île-de-France: 1,500,000
- Le Havre: 70,000
- Canada (predominantly Quebec): 17,465

Languages
- Breton, French, Gallo

Religion
- Predominantly Roman Catholic

Related ethnic groups
- Celts: Britons (Cornish, English, Welsh) and Gaels (Irish, Manx and Scots) and French.

The Bretons (/ˈbrɛtɒnz, -ənz, -ɒ̃z/; Breton: Bretoned or Vretoned, Breton pronunciation: [breˈtɔ̃nɛt]) are a Celtic ethnic group native to Brittany, north-western France. Originally, the demonym designated groups of Brittonic speakers who emigrated from southwestern Great Britain, particularly Cornwall and Devon, mostly during the Anglo-Saxon settlement of Britain. They migrated in waves from the 3rd to 9th century (most heavily from 450 to 600) to the west of Armorica. That western part of Armorica was subsequently named after them, as were the inhabitants.

The traditional language of Brittany is Breton (Brezhoneg), a Celtic language of the Brittonic branch now mostly spoken in Lower Brittany (i.e., the western part of the peninsula). Breton is spoken by around 206,000 people as of 2013. The other principal minority language of Brittany is Gallo, a Romance language; Gallo is spoken only in Upper Brittany, where Breton used to be spoken as well but it has seen a decline and has been less dominant in Upper Brittany since around the year 900. Currently, most Bretons' native language is standard French.

Historically, Brittany and its people have been counted as one of the six Celtic nations. The actual number of Bretons in Brittany and France as a whole is difficult to assess as the government of France does not collect statistics on ethnicity. The population of Brittany, based on a January 2007 estimate, was 4,365,500. There is reason to believe that this number includes the department of Loire-Atlantique, which the Vichy government separated from historical Brittany in 1941.

It is said that, in 1914, over one million people spoke Breton west of the boundary between the Breton and Gallo-speaking region—roughly 90% of the population of the western half of Brittany. In 1945, Breton speakers consisted about 75% of the population. In 2018, a study commissioned by the administrative region of Brittany (Loire-Atlantique included) revealed that 5.5% of Bretons considered that they spoke the language (around 213,000 people). In 2024, according to a new study, 2.7% of people surveyed said they spoke Breton very well or fairly well (around 107,000 people). However, the average age of Breton speakers has fallen from 70 in 2018, to 58.5 in 2024.

A strong historical emigration has created a Breton diaspora within the French borders and in the overseas departments and territories of France; it is mainly established in the Paris area, where more than one million people claim Breton heritage. Many Breton families have also migrated to the Americas, predominantly to Canada (mostly Quebec and Atlantic Canada) and the United States. The only places outside Brittany that still retain significant Breton customs are in Île-de-France (mainly Quartier de Montparnasse in Paris), Le Havre and Îles des Saintes, where a group of Breton families settled in the mid-17th century.

== History ==
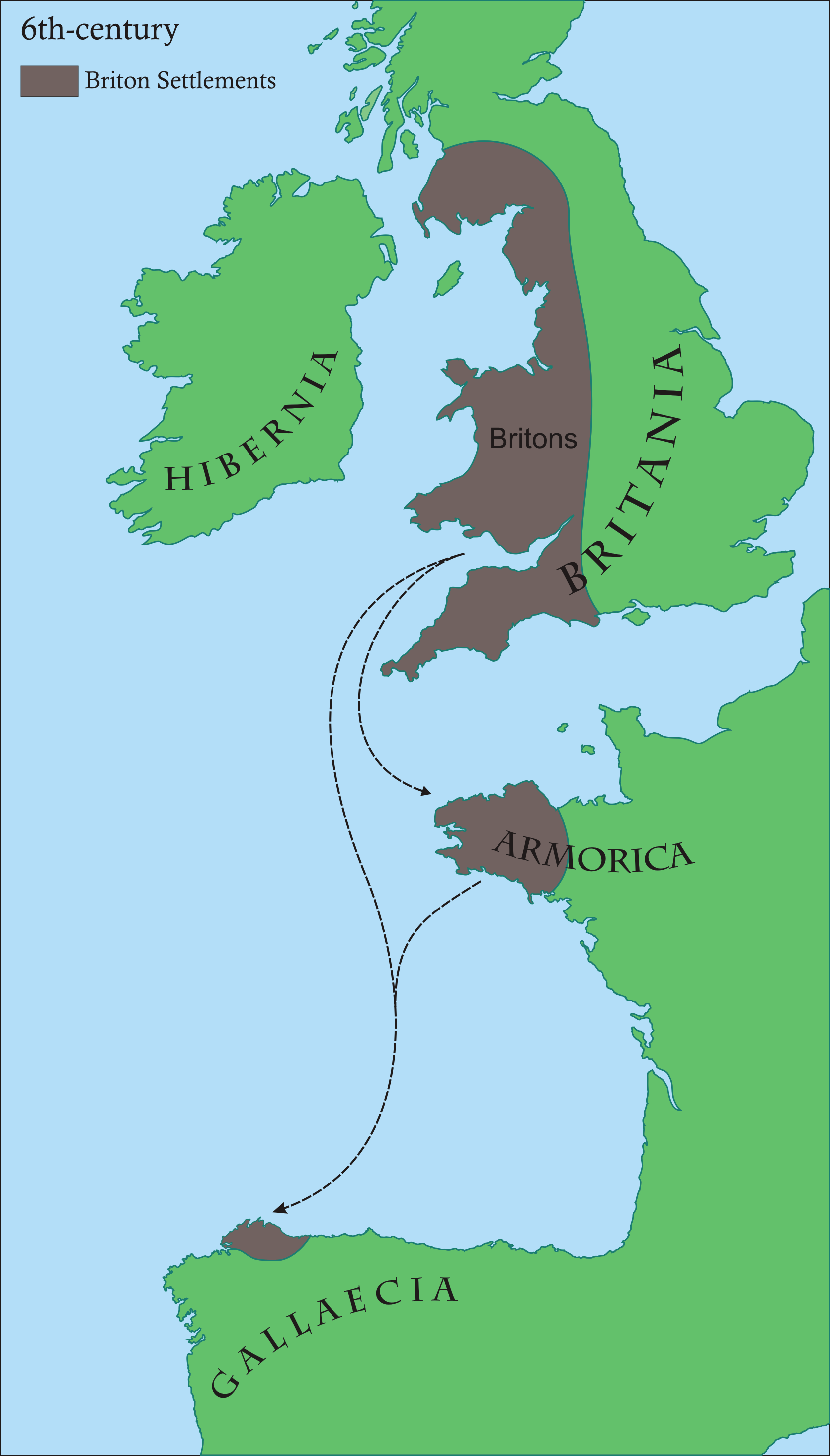
The Brittonic-speaking community around the sixth century. The sea was a communication medium rather than a barrier.

=== Late Roman era ===
In the late fourth century, large numbers of British auxiliary troops in the Roman army may have been stationed in Armorica; Armorica corresponds with the current Brittany and most of Normandy. The ninth-century Historia Brittonum states that the emperor Magnus Maximus, who withdrew Roman forces from Britain, settled his troops in Armorica.

Nennius and Gildas mention a second wave of Britons settling in Armorica in the following century to escape the invading Anglo-Saxons and Scoti. Modern archaeology also supports a two-wave migration.

It is generally accepted that the Brittonic speakers who arrived gave the west of Armorica its current name as well as the Breton language, Brezhoneg, a sister language to Welsh and Cornish.

There are numerous records of Celtic Christian missionaries migrating from Britain during the second wave of Breton colonisation, especially the legendary seven founder-saints of Brittany as well as Gildas.

As in Cornwall, many Breton towns are named after these early saints. The Irish saint Columbanus was also active in Brittany and is commemorated at Saint-Columban in Carnac.

=== Early Middle Ages ===
In the Early Middle Ages, Brittany was divided into three kingdoms—Domnonée, Cornouaille (Kernev), and Bro Waroc'h (Broërec)—which eventually were incorporated into the Duchy of Brittany. The first two kingdoms seem to derive their names from the homelands of the migrating tribes in Britain, Cornwall (Kernow) and Devon (Dumnonia). Bro Waroc'h ("land of Waroch", now Bro Gwened) derives from the name of one of the first known Breton rulers, who dominated the region of Vannes (Gwened). The rulers of Domnonée, such as Conomor, sought to expand their territory, claiming overlordship over all Bretons, though there was constant tension between local lords.

==== Breton participation in the Norman Conquest of England ====
Bretons were the most prominent of the non-Norman forces in the Norman conquest of England. A number of Breton families were of the highest rank in the new society and were tied to the Normans by marriage.

The Scottish Clan Stewart and the royal House of Stuart have Breton origins. Alan Rufus, also known as Alan the Red, was both a cousin and knight in the retinue of William the Conqueror. Following his service at Hastings, he was rewarded with large estates in Yorkshire. At the time of his death, he was by far the richest noble in England. His manorial holding at Richmond ensured a Breton presence in northern England. The Earldom of Richmond later became an appanage of the Dukes of Brittany.

== Modern Breton identity ==
The modern flag of Brittany: Gwenn-ha-du (White-and-black)

Many people throughout France claim Breton ethnicity, including a few French celebrities such as Marion Cotillard, Suliane Brahim, Malik Zidi, Patrick Poivre d'Arvor, Yoann Gourcuff, Nolwenn Leroy and Yann Tiersen.

The assertion of Breton identity has sometimes brought Bretons into conflict with the French state. Under the law of 11 germinal an XI (1803), only first names drawn from approved calendars or from ancient history could be entered in the civil registers, and Breton-language names were often rejected, although a 1966 ministerial instruction and later case law allowed names established in local tradition. From the 1950s, the Breton activists Jean-Jacques and Mireille Manrot-Le Goarnig fought a fifteen-year court case after registrars refused to record the Breton first names of their younger children, leaving six of them without civil status; the family was denied family benefits and several of its members were imprisoned. According to later press accounts, a decision at the European level described the six unregistered children as "European citizens of Breton nationality" — a formula that, as Le Figaro noted, was used only once and confers no legal status, since Breton nationality does not exist in French law. In 2016, Jonathan Le Bris sought to renounce French nationality and be recognised as a Breton national, invoking the Goarnig precedent. Disputes over Breton names have continued: in 2019 a child named Fañch definitively won the right to keep the tilde in his first name when the Court of Cassation rejected a final appeal against a Rennes appeal-court ruling in his favour.

== Diaspora ==
The Breton community outside Brittany includes groups of Bretons in France and in others countries. According to data from the administrative region of Brittany, around 400 000 Bretons live in a country other than France, most notably in Canada and the United States.

=== In France ===
The Breton community outside Brittany includes groups of Bretons in the Greater Paris area, Le Havre, and Toulon. In Paris, Bretons used to settle in the neighborhood around the Montparnasse train station, which is also the terminus of the Paris-Brest railway. The Paris Metro construction was co-directed by a Breton, Fulgence Bienvenüe. On 30 June 1933, the "Avenue du Maine" station on the Metro was renamed "Bienvenüe" in his honor. Connected by a corridor to the Montparnasse metro station, located beneath the Montparnasse railway station, Bienvenüe station finally merged with Montparnasse station in 1942 to become Montparnasse – Bienvenüe metro station.

=== In the United States ===
Famous Breton Americans and Americans of Breton descent include John James Audubon, Jack Kerouac, Sylvester Stallone and Tina Weymouth.

From 1885 to 1970, several thousand Bretons migrated to the United States, many of them leaving the Black Mountains of Morbihan. In June 2020, a replica of the Statue of Liberty was dedicated in Gourin, Morbihan, to celebrate the legacy of these emigrants.

=== In China ===
Bretons have also emigrated to China. A Breton association regularly organises the ‘Fest-noz de Pékin’ (Beijing Fest-Noz).

=== In Chile ===
At the same time as the French emigrated to Chile in the 19th century, many Bretons also emigrated to Chile. Chilean dictator Augusto Pinochet is a notable descendant from a Breton immigrant from Lamballe.

== Culture ==
=== Religion ===
The Breton people are predominantly members of the Catholic Church, with minorities in the Reformed Church of France and non-religious people. Brittany was one of the most staunchly Catholic regions in all of France. Attendance at Sunday mass dropped during the 1970s and the 1980s; however, other religious practices, such as pilgrimages, have experienced a revival. This includes the Tro Breizh, which takes place in the shrines of the seven founding saints of Breton Christianity. The Christian tradition is widely respected by both believers and nonbelievers, who see it as a symbol of Breton heritage and culture.

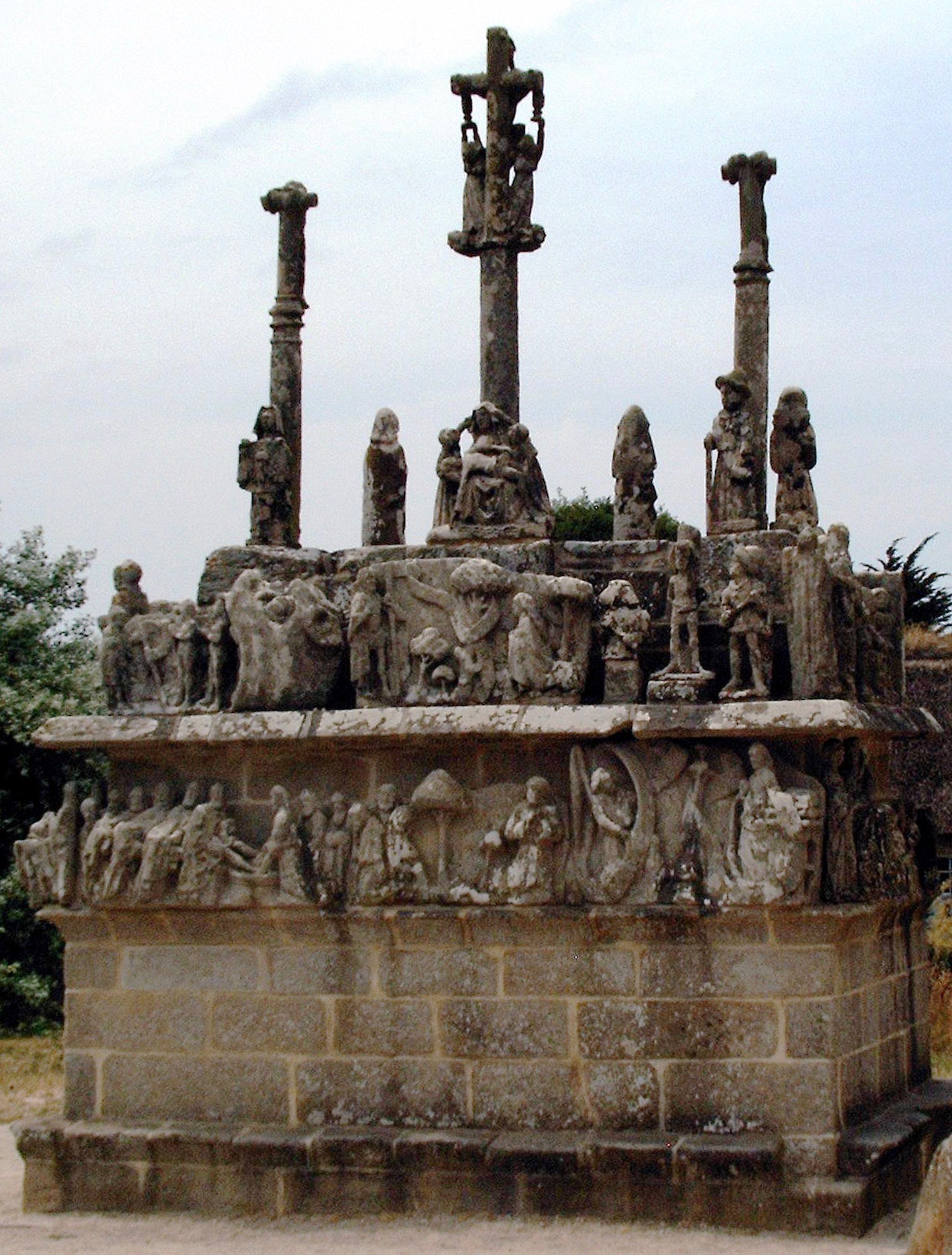
Sculpted calvaries can be found in many villages

Breton religious tradition places great emphasis on the "Seven Founder Saints":

- Paul Aurelian, at Saint-Pol-de-Léon (Breton: Kastell-Paol),
- Tudwal (Sant Tudwal), at Tréguier (Breton: Landreger),
- Brioc, at Saint-Brieuc (Breton: Sant-Brieg, Gallo: Saent-Berioec),
- Malo, at Saint-Malo (Breton: Sant-Maloù, Gallo: Saent-Malô),
- Samson of Dol, at Dol-de-Bretagne (Breton: Dol, Gallo: Dóu),
- Padarn, at Vannes (Breton: Gwened),
- Corentin (Sant Kaourintin), at Quimper (Breton: Kemper).

=== Pardons ===
A pardon is the patron saint's feast day of the parish. It often begins with a procession followed by mass in honour of the saint. Pardons are often accompanied by small village fairs. The three most famous pardons are:

- Sainte-Anne d'Auray/Santez-Anna-Wened
- Tréguier/Landreger, in honour of St Yves
- Locronan/Lokorn, in honour of St Ronan, with a troménie (a procession, 12 km long) and numerous people in traditional costumes

=== Tro Breizh ===
There is an ancient pilgrimage called the Tro Breizh (tour of Brittany) which involves pilgrims walking around Brittany from the grave of one of the Seven Founder Saints to another. Currently, pilgrims complete the circuit over the course of several years. In 2002, the Tro Breizh included a special pilgrimage to Wales, symbolically making the reverse journey of the Welshmen Paul Aurelian, Brioc, and Samson. According to Breton religious tradition, whoever does not make the pilgrimage at least once in his lifetime will be condemned to make it after his death, advancing only by the length of his coffin every seven years.

=== Folklore and traditional belief ===
Some pagan customs from the old pre-Christian tradition remain the folklore of Brittany. The most powerful folk figure is the Ankou or the "Reaper of Death".

=== Language ===
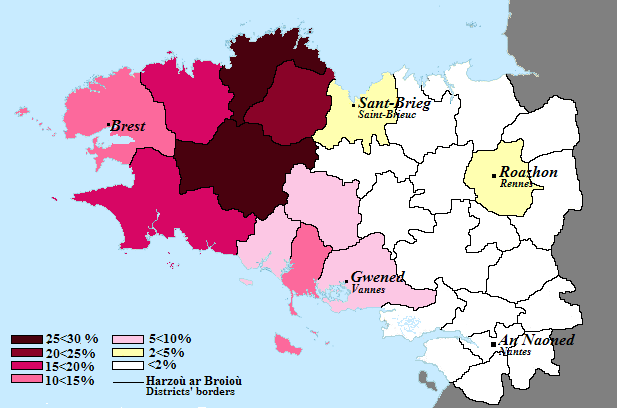
Regional statistics of Breton speakers, in 2004

A Breton speaker, recorded in the United States.

There are four main Breton dialects: Gwenedeg (Vannes), Kerneveg (Cornouaille), Leoneg (Leon) and Tregerieg (Trégor), which have varying degrees of mutual intelligibility. In 1908, a standard orthography was devised. The fourth dialect, Gwenedeg, was not included in this reform, but was included in the later orthographic reform of 1941.

The Breton language is a very important part of Breton identity. Breton itself is one of the Brittonic languages and is closely related to Cornish and more distantly to Welsh. Breton is thus an Insular Celtic language and is more distantly related to the long-extinct Continental Celtic languages, such as Gaulish, that were formerly spoken on the European mainland, including the areas colonised by the ancestors of the Bretons.

In eastern Brittany, a regional langue d'oïl, Gallo, developed. Gallo shares certain areal features such as points of vocabulary, idiom, and pronunciation with Breton, but is a Romance language. Neither language has official status under French law; however, some still use Breton as an everyday language. As of the 1980s, bilingual roadsides have been placed around the department as a way to regain a sense of cultural heritage.

From 1880 to the mid-20th century, Breton was banned from the French school system and children were punished for speaking it. This was similar to Britain's enforcement of English, not Welsh, being used in Welsh schools during the 18th and early 19th centuries. The situation changed in 1951 with the Deixonne Law. This law allowed Breton language and culture to be taught 1–3 hours a week in the public school system on the provision that a teacher was both able and prepared to do so. In modern times, a number of schools and colleges have emerged with the aim of providing Breton-medium education or bilingual Breton/French education.

=== Breton-language media ===
There are a number of Breton language weekly and monthly magazines. Newspapers, magazines and online journals available in Breton include Al Lanv (based in Quimper), Al Liamm, Louarnig-Rouzig, and Bremañ.

Several radio stations broadcast in the Breton language: Arvorig FM, France Bleu Armorique, France Bleu Breizh-Izel, Radio Bro Gwened, Radio Kerne, and Radio Kreiz Breizh.

Television programmes in Breton are available on Brezhoweb, France 3 Breizh, France 3 Iroise, TV Breizh and TV Rennes.

=== Music ===
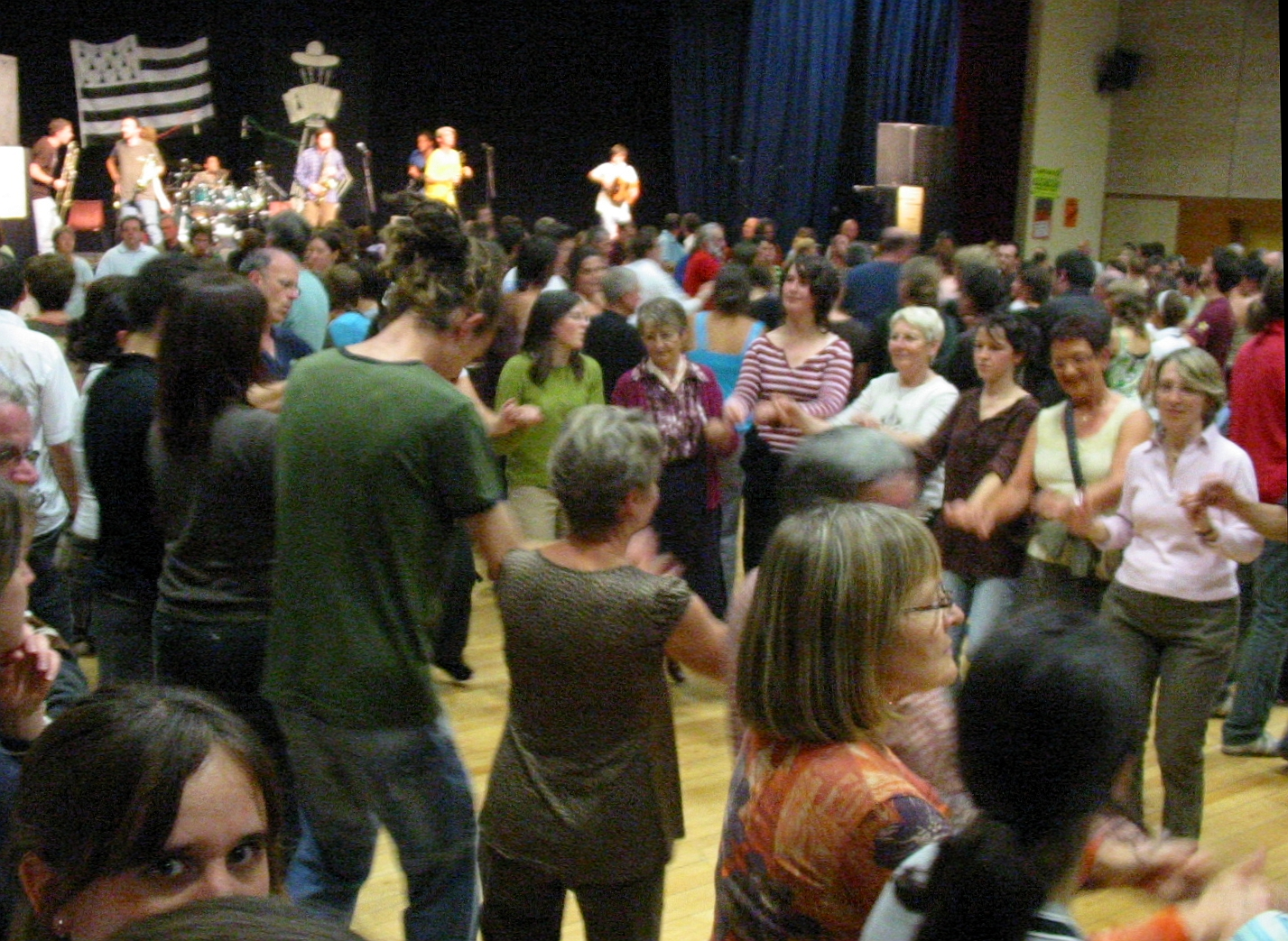
A fest-noz in the Pays Gallo in September 2007 as part of the Mill Góll festival

==== Fest-noz ====
A fest-noz is a traditional festival (essentially a dance) in Brittany. Many festoù-noz are held outside Brittany, taking regional Breton culture outside Brittany. Although the traditional dances of the fest-noz are old, some dating back to the Middle Ages, the fest-noz tradition is itself more recent, dating back to the 1950s. Fest-Noz was officially registered on Wednesday, December 5, 2012, by UNESCO on the "Representative List of the Intangible Cultural Heritage of Humanity."

==== Traditional dance ====
There are many traditional Breton dances, the most well-known being gavottes, An Dro, the hanter dro, and the plinn. During the fest-noz, most dances are practised in a chain or in a circle with participants locking little (pinky) fingers; however, there are also dances in pairs and choreographed dances with sequences and figures.

==== Traditional Breton music ====
Two main types of Breton music are a choral a cappella tradition called kan ha diskan, and music involving instruments, including purely instrumental music. Traditional instruments include the bombard (similar to an oboe) and two types of bagpipes (veuze and binioù kozh). Other instruments often found are the diatonic accordion, the clarinet, and occasionally violin as well as the hurdy-gurdy. After World War II, the Great Highland bagpipe (and binioù bras) became commonplace in Brittany through the bagadoù (Breton pipe bands) and thus often replaced the binioù-kozh. The basic clarinet (treujenn-gaol) had all but disappeared but has regained popularity over the past few years.

==== Modern Breton music ====
Nowadays groups with many different styles of music may be found, ranging from rock to jazz such as Red Cardell, ethno-rock, Diwall and Skeduz as well as punk. Some modern fest-noz groups also use electronic keyboards and synthesisers, for example Strobinell, Sonerien Du, Les Baragouineurs, and Plantec.

== Breton cuisine ==
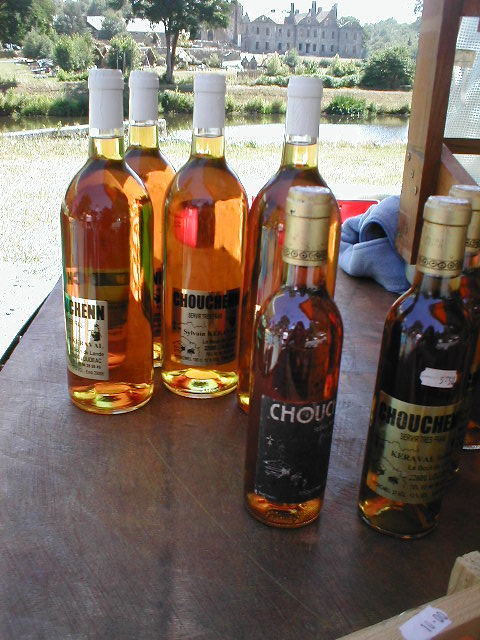
Chouchen

Breton cuisine contains many elements from the wider French culinary tradition. Local specialities include:

- Chouchenn – a type of Breton mead
- Fars forn (far breton) – a sweet suet pudding with prunes
- Kouign-amann – butter pastry
- Krampouezh (crêpes or galettes) – thin pancakes made either from wheat or buckwheat flour; usually eaten as a main course
- Lambig – apple eau de vie
- Sistr – cider
- Caramel au beurre salé – salted butter caramel

== Symbols of Brittany ==
Shield of Ermine. The ermine symbol here can be seen on the Breton flag, and is an important symbol to the Breton people.

Traditional Breton symbols of Brittany include:

This triskele is the most common form of the triskele seen in Breton imagery.

- The national anthem Bro Gozh ma Zadoù, based on the Welsh Hen Wlad Fy Nhadau.
- The traditional motto of the former Dukes of Brittany is Kentoc'h mervel eget bezañ saotret in Breton, or Potius mori quam fœdari in Latin which translates to "death before dishonour".
- The "national day" is observed on 1 August, the Feast of Saint Erwann (Saint Yves). Although, the "Gouel Breizh" (Festival of Brittany), is the biggest Breton national event, taking place every year during the week of the 19th of May: the day Saint Yves died.
- The ermine is an important symbol of Brittany reflected in the ancient blazons of the Duchy of Brittany and also in the chivalric order, L’Ordre de l’Hermine (The Order of the Ermine).
- The triskele is also an important symbol in Breton culture. The triskele is a traditional Celtic symbol that the Bretons use to connect them to their Celtic heritage.

== See also ==
- Breton nationalism
- Brythons
- List of Breton authors
- List of Breton poets
- List of Breton saints
- Wikipedia in Breton

== Gallery ==
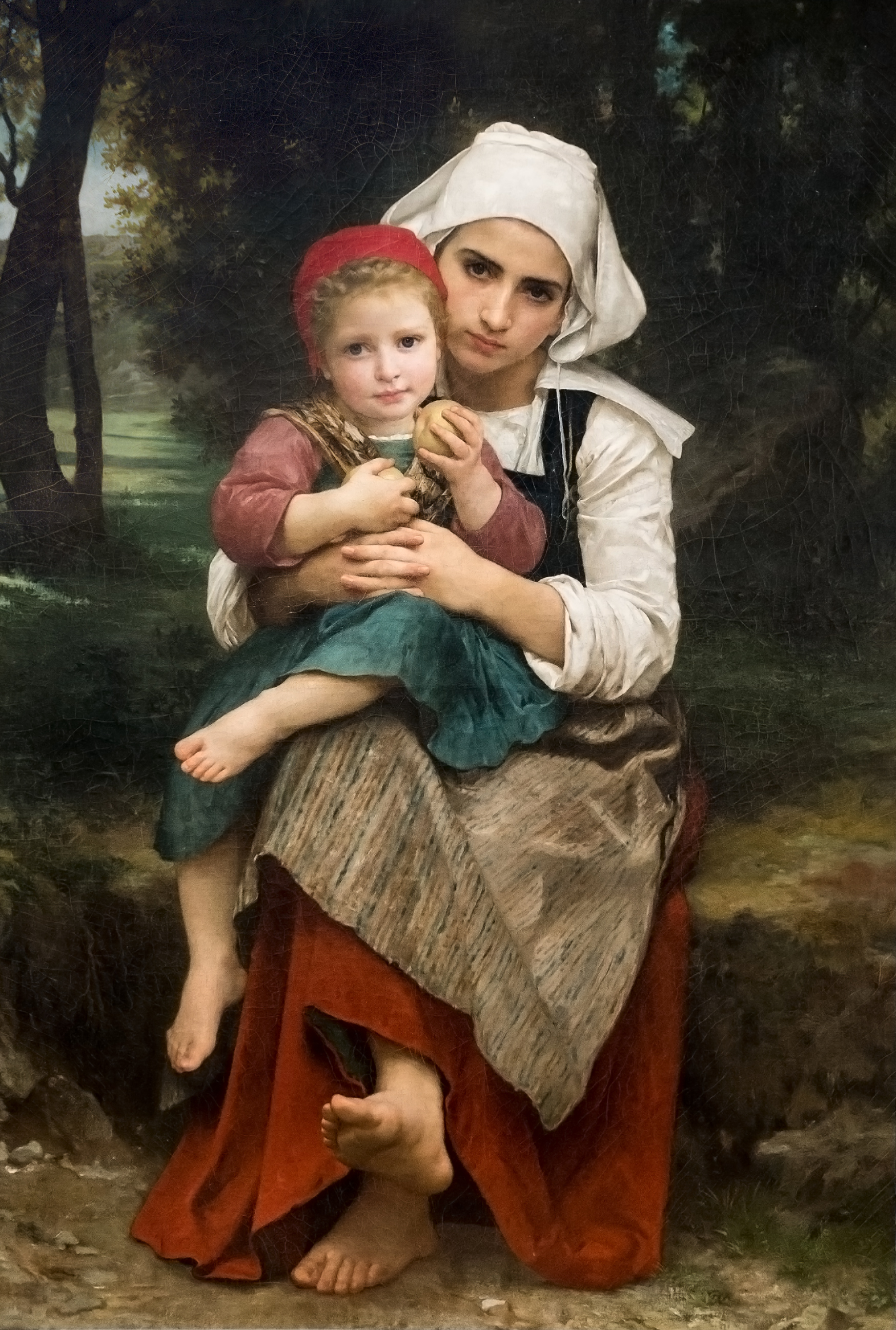
William-Adolphe Bouguereau, Breton Brother and Sister

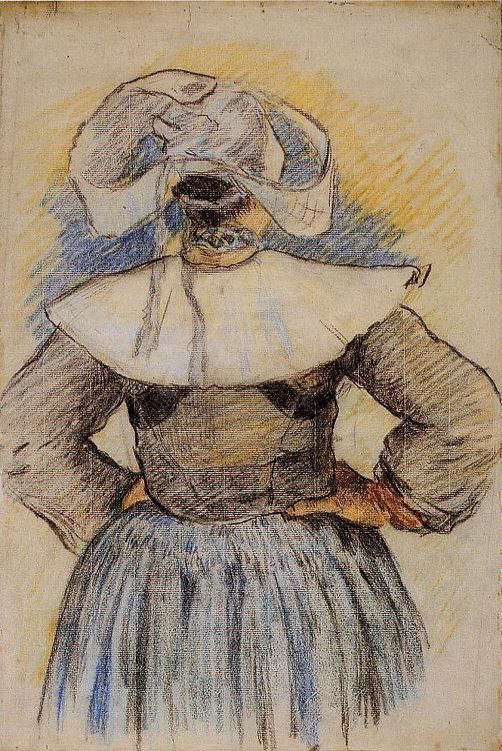
Paul Gauguin, Breton Girl

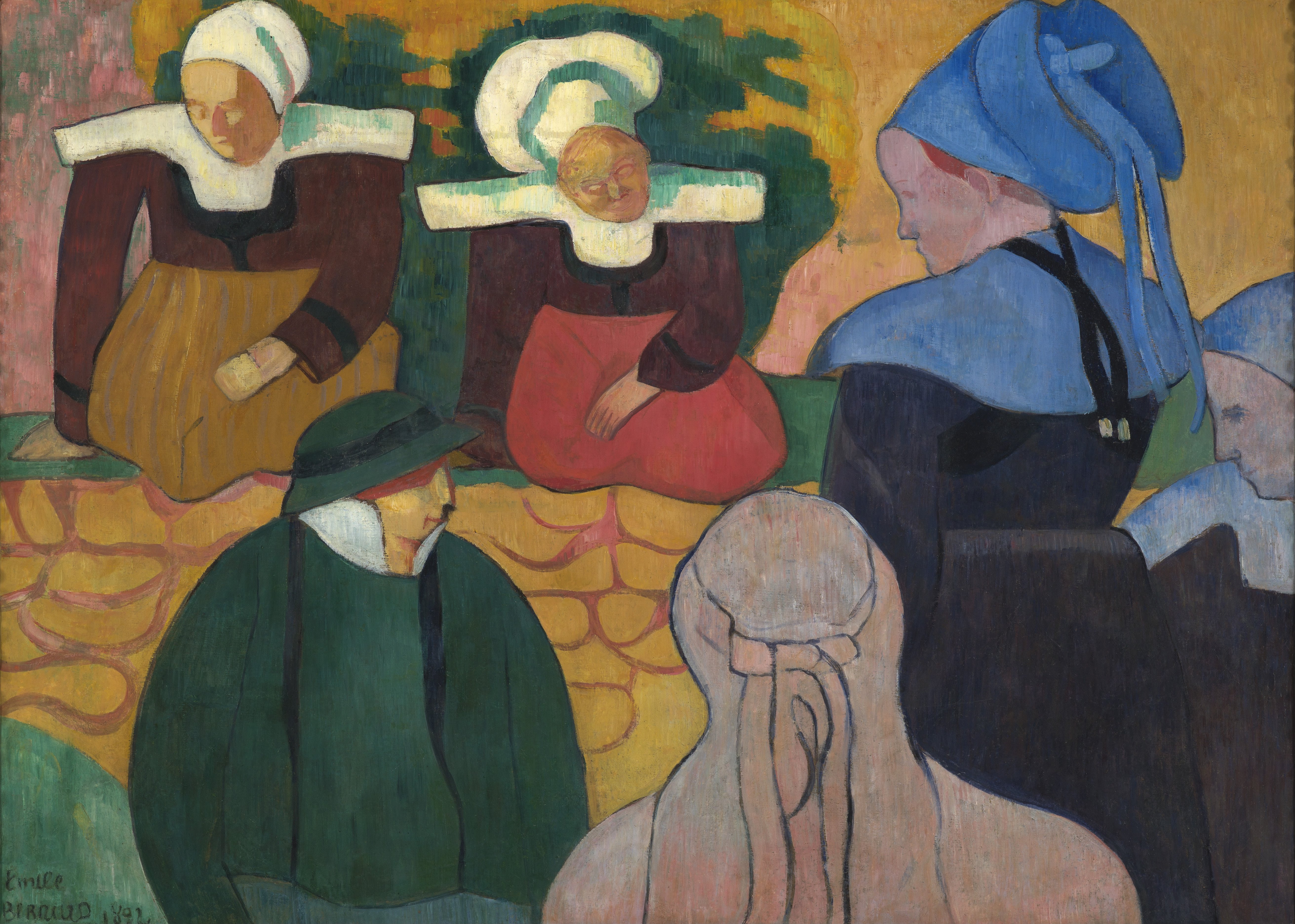
Émile Bernard, Breton Women at a Wall

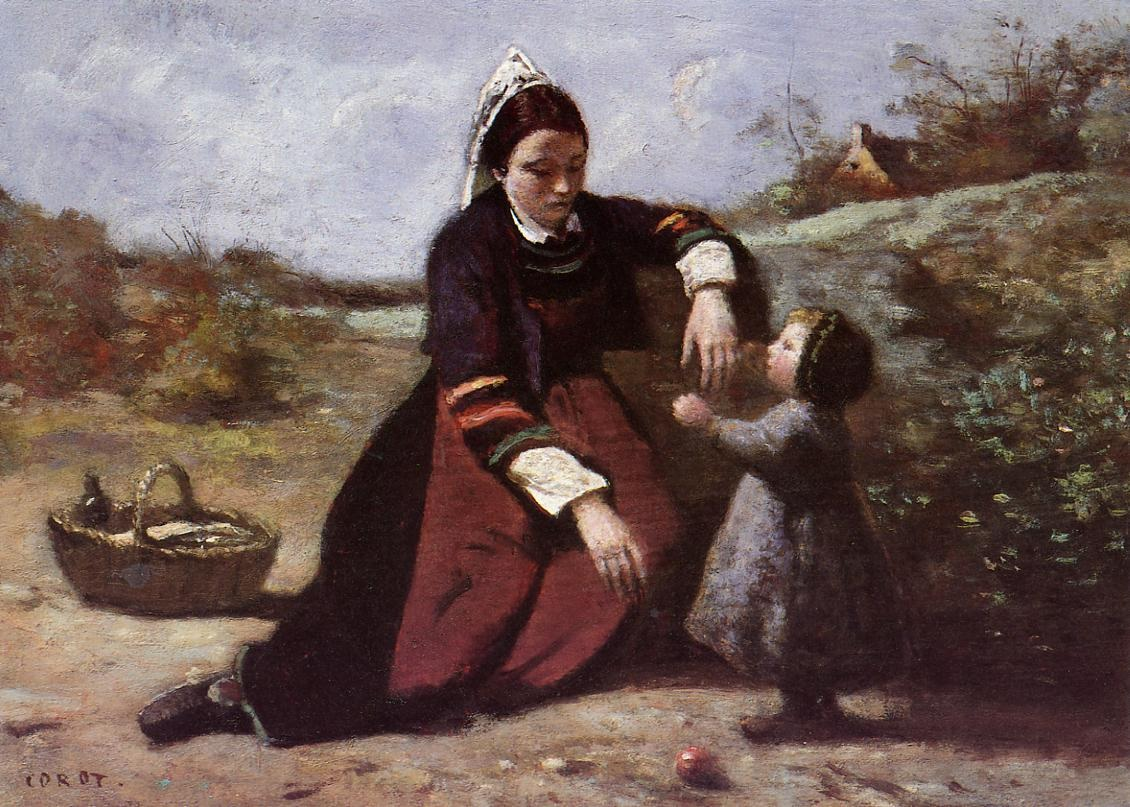
Jean-Baptiste-Camille, Breton woman and her little daughter

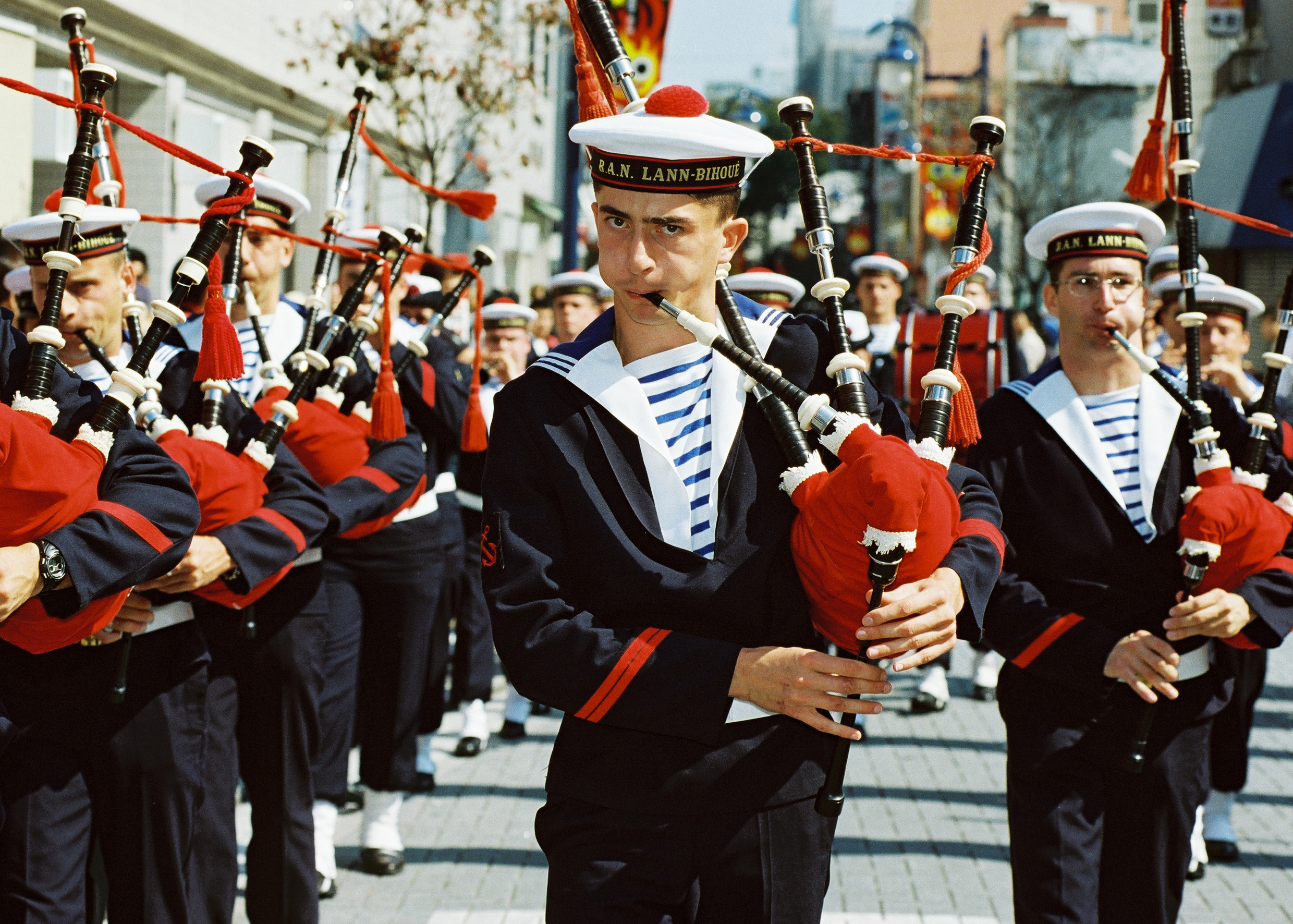
The bagad of Lann-Bihoué of the French Navy

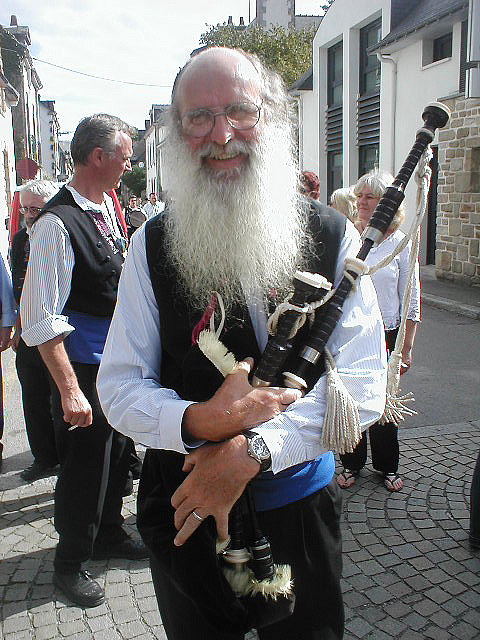
Breton pipe player
