= René Galand =

French writer and professor

- Born: Reun ar C'halan; 27 January 1923; Châteauneuf-du-Faou, France
- Died: 28 May 2017 (aged 94); Hingham, Massachusetts, U.S.
- Occupations: Academic, literary critic, author
- Writing career
- Genres: Poetry and short stories, autobiography

René Marie Galand (Reun ar C'halan in Breton) (January 27, 1923 – May 28, 2017) was a writer and Professor of French. He was born in Châteauneuf-du-Faou in Brittany.

== Biography ==
René Galand was born on January 27, 1923, in Châteauneuf-du-Faou (Finistère), to a family of farmers. He was still quite young when his father, like many other Bretons from the area, emigrated to the United States, where his wife joined him later. Their two children remained in Brittany for their education, René, a boarder in a lycée, in Quimper at first, and then in Brest, and his sister in a boarding school for girls, first in Carhaix, then in Quimperlé. They spent the holidays in Châteauneuf with their grandparents.

René Galand received his baccalauréat in mathematics in 1941 in Brest. He pursued his studies in Rennes, where he received a second baccalauréat in philosophy in 1942 and a licence ès lettres in 1944. He had also successfully completed the competitive entrance examinations for the École Spéciale Militaire de Saint-Cyr, the French Military Academy. At the end of 1942, he made his first contacts with the French Resistance, and in June 1944, following the Allied landings in Normandy, he fought for the liberation of France. Promoted to "aspirant" in October 1944, he was sent to the École Militaire Inter-Armes of Cherchell (Algeria), which was later transferred to Koetkidan. Promoted to the rank of second lieutenant in June 1945, he was sent to the French Forces of Occupation in Germany. At the end of 1946, he resigned his commission in the active service and joined his parents and his sister in the United States.

Galand taught at Yale University as a teaching assistant while pursuing his doctoral studies. He received his Ph.D. in French literature in 1952. From 1951 to 1993, he taught at Wellesley College, lecturing primarily on 19th and 20th century French literature He served as chair of the French Department from 1968 to 1972.

René Galand is the author of numerous studies of French writers from Chateaubriand, Renan and Baudelaire to Camus, Robbe-Grillet and the Oulipo. His publications include five books, collective works, articles and reviews which have appeared in such journals as The French Review, The Romantic Review, Revue d'Histoire littéraire de la France, Revue de littérature comparée, PMLA, Yale French Studies, Symposium, Dada/Surrealism, and World Literature Today. He also has published essays on American writers (Melville, T. S. Eliot, Lovecraft, Kerouac) and the Spanish poet Jorge Guillén.

Under the Breton form of his name, Reun ar C'halan, he published extensively in Breton: poems (three volumes), short stories (one volume), autobiography (two volumes), as well as many individual poems, short stories, and critical studies about Breton literature as well as reviews of books written in the Breton language. The latter have appeared in collections of his works and in such journals as Skrid, Poésie-Bretagne, Pobl Vreizh, Barr-Heol, Keltoi, Bro Nevez, Proceedings of the Harvard Celtic Colloquium, Keltica, and World Literature Today. He also gave papers at meetings of the Harvard Celtic Colloquium and of Celtic Studies Association of North America (CSANA) and taken part in the work of the American branch of the International Committee for the Defense of the Breton Language. Some of his works have been translated and published in other languages: French, English, German, Welsh, Dutch, and Polish. Critics have ranked him among the best Breton writers of his generation.

== Prizes ==
In 1971, Galand was awarded the Palmes Académiques by the government of France for his contributions to the study of French literature. In 1979, he received the Xavier de Langlais Prize for his first collection of poems, Levr ar Blanedenn (The Book of Fate), and, in 2003, the Imram Prize for his Breton literary writings.

== Publications ==
A complete bibliography of Galand's writings up to 2005 has been published in the Breton journal Al Liamm Since that date, other works have appeared: a collection of short stories A-bell hag a-dost (So far and so near). Another short story, "Lizher eus ar vered," appeared in Al Liamm (April 2006).

=== Books ===
- L'âme celtique de Renan, 1959
- Baudelaire: poétiques et poésie, 1969
- Saint-John Perse (in English), 1972
- Levr ar blanedenn, 1981 (poems)
- Klemmgan Breizh, 1985 (poems)
- Canevas: études sur la poésie française de Baudelaire à l'Oulipo, 1986
- Lorc'h ar rouaned, 1989 (poems)
- Stratégie de la lecture, 1990
- War hentoù an tremened, I-2002, II-2005 (autobiography)
- A-bell hag a-dost, 2009 (short stories)

=== Collections ===
- Baudelaire as a love poet and other essays, 1969
- Homosexualities and French Literature, 1979
- A Critical Bibliography of French Literature, 1980
- The Binding of Proteus, 1980
- Bretagne et pays celtiques. Mélanges offerts à la mémoire de Léon Fleuriot, 1982
- Du ha Gwyn, 1985
- Verhalen van de wereld, 1988
- Homenaje a Justina de Conde, 1992
- The New Princeton Encyclopedia of Poetry and poetics, 1993
- Und suchte meine Zunge ab nach Worten, 1996
- Writing the Wind: A Celtic Resurgence, 1997
- Ik hab geen ander land, 1998
- Bretagne et peuples d'Europe, 1999
- Danevelloù divyezhek / Nouvelles bilingues, 2002

=== Articles ===
- "T.S. Eliot and the impact of Baudelaire", Yale French Studies, vol. 6 (1950), pp. 27 34
- "Proust et Baudelaire", PMLA, Dec. 1950, pp. 1011 "Renan savait il le breton?", Nouvelle Revue de Bretagne, Nov. Dec. 1952, pp. 44 47
- "Four French Attitudes on Life: Montherlant, Malraux, Sartre, Camus", Bulletin of the New England MLA, Feb. 1953, pp. 9 15
- "La genèse du thème celtique chez Renan", Nouvelle Revue de Bretagne, May June 1953, pp. 166 176
- "Trois lettres inédites de Renan, PMLA, Dec. 1958, pp. 545 548
- "La dimension sociale dans La Jalousie de Robbe Grillet", The French Review, April 1966, pp. 703 708
- "Baudelaire et La Fontaine de Jouvence", Bulletin baudelairien, August 1966, pp. 1–7
- "Une énigme baudelairienne", The Romanic Review, April 1967, pp. 77 82
- "Rimbaud et la Dame aux camélias", Bulletin de la Société des Professeurs français en Amérique (1967), pp. 45 46
- "Baudelaire's Psychology of Play", The French Review, (Special issue, Winter 1971), pp. 12 19
- Art. "La Vision de l'Inconscient chez Baudelaire", Symposium, (Spring 1972), pp. 15 23
- "A Prophet for our Times: Saint John Perse", The American Legion of Honor Magazine, vol. 43 (1972), no 3, pp. 143 158
- "En marge d'Éloges", The French Review, (Special issue, Spring 1973), pp. 112–119
- "Baudelaire, poet of conjecture", The American Legion of Honor Magazine, vol. 46 (1975), no 1, pp. 39–53
- "Cocteau, or the poet as magician", The American Legion of Honor Magazine, vol 46 (1975), no 3, pp. 139 154
- "Aesthetic Value and the Unconscious", Les Bonnes Feuilles, Summer 1975, pp. 90 95
- "Visite à Saint John Perse", The French Review, Feb. 1976, pp. 401 404
- "Poets and Politics: The Revival of Nationalism in Breton Poetry since World War I", World Literature Today, Spring 1980, pp. 218 222
- "From Dada to the Computer", Dada/Surrealism, no 10 11 (1982), pp. 149 160
- "The Breton Struggle for National Survival", Keltica, no 2 (1983), pp. 21 30
- "Didactique du discours amoureux: le 'Mignonne ...' de Ronsard", Teaching Language Through Literature, vol. XXIV (1985), no 2, pp. 15 26
- "The Tragic Vision of Tangi Malmanche", World Literature Today (Summer 1985), pp. 355 363
- "Chateaubriand: le rocher de René", Romanic Review (November 1986), pp. 330 342
- "Stumm ha ster ar stourm speredel e Komzoù bev" [Form and meaning of the spiritual struggle in Komzo ù bev], Al Liamm, no 240 (1987)
- "Microlecture de Giraudoux", The French Review, March 1987, pp. 497 501 Art. "E koun
- "The Origins of Meven Mordiern's Celtic Calling", Proceedings of the Harvard Celtic Colloquium, Vol. V (1988), pp. 172–186
- "Baudelaire devant les choses: profondeur ou surface?", Bulletin de la Société des Professeurs français en Amérique 1987-88 (1989), pp. 67–79
- "Modern Breton Fiction and the Emsav", Keltoi, vol. 2 (1990), no 2, pp. 15–20
- "The Ideological Significance of Emgann Kergidu", Proceedings of the Harvard Celtic Colloquium, vols. VI-VII (1990), pp. 47–68
- "Baudelaire, Rimbaud, Verlaine, Mallarmé, Or The Imposture Of Poetry", in Justina. Homenage a Justina Ruiz de Conde (Erie: Alddeu, 1992), eds. Elena Gascón-Vera and Joy Renjilian-Burgy, pp. 45–58
- "Oulipo", The New Princeton Encyclopedia of Poetry and Poetics (Princeton University Press, 1993) pp. 872–873
- "Breton Poetry", in The New Princeton Encyclopedia of Poetry and Poetics (Princeton University Press, 1993), pp. 146–147
- "Giraudoux connaissait-il William T. Stead?", Revue de Littérature comparée, Avril-Juin 1993, pp. 233–242
- "Le monstre des Feuillantines: une énigme hugolienne", Revue d'histoire littéraire de la France, Sept.-Oct. 1994, pp. 805–807
- "Al lennegezh vrezhonek ha skridvarnouriezh an amzer-vremañ: I. Istor ha kealoniezh: Emgann Kergidu"["Breton literature and present day criticism. I. History and Ideology: La Bataille de Kerguidu"], Al Liamm, (Sept.-Oct. 1994), no 286, pp. 361–383; II. "Hennvoud ar reuzc'hoari e c'hoariva Tangi Malmanche"["The essence of tragedy in the plays of Tangi Malmanche"], Al Liamm, (Nov.-Déc. 1994), no 287, pp. 512–527 .; III. "Ar faltazi hag ar c'hoari e buhezskridoù Meven Mordiern" ["Fancy and Play in Meven Mordiern's autobiographical works], Al Liamm, (Jan.-Fév.1995), no 288, pp. 38-51
- "An oberenn lennegel hag an Emsav" [L'œuvre littéraire et l'Emsav], Al Liamm (Mars-Avril 1995), no 289, pp. 154–158
- "An ad ludendumne an ad scribendum: skrivañ=c'hoari?" [writing=playing], Al Liamm (Mai-Août 1995), no 290–291, pp. 252–265
- "Ar spered broadel ha lennegezh vrezhonek an amzer-vremañ" [The nationaliste spirit and today's Breton literature], Al Liamm (Nov.-Dec. 1995), no 293, pp. 454–484
- "Galvedigezh keltiek Meven Mordiern" [The Celtic Calling of Meven Mordiern], Al Liamm (Jan.-Feb. 1996), no 294, pp. 22–49
- "Orin ar simbol" [The symbol's origin], Al Liamm (Jan.-Feb. 1996), no 294, pp. 66–67
- Poem "Mojenn", Al Liamm (Mar.-Apr. 1996), no 295, p. 104
- "Selladoù ouzh buhez an Emsav. Lizhiri Frañsez Vallée: 1916-1939" [Views on the Emsav. The Letters of F. Vallée 1916-1939], Al Liamm (May-Aug. 1996), no 296–297, pp. 243–263; (Sept.-Oct. 1996), no 298, pp. 360–381
- "Meven Mordiern hag impalaerouriezh Bro-C'hall. I. Aloubidigezh Aljeria; II. Brezel ar Meksik" [Meven Mordiern and French Imperialism. I. The Conquest of Algeria. II. The Mexican War], Al Liamm, (Genver-C'hwevrer 1997), niv. 300, pp. 59–78; (Meurzh-Ebrel 1997), niv. 301, pp. 162–190
- "Jack Kerouac: touelloù ha disouezhadennoù" [Jack Kerouac: illusions and disillusions], Al Liamm, niv. 305 (Du-Kerzu 1997), pp. 518–548
- "E koun André Pieyre de Mandiargues" [In Memory of André Pieyre de Mandiargues], Al Liamm, niv. 306 (Genver-C'hwevrer 1998), pp. 15–25
- "Jorge Guillén, barzh ar Boud" [Jorge Guillén, Poet of Being], Al Liamm, niv. 307 (Meurzh-Ebrel 1998), pp. 152–163
- "Me gloazet Howard Phillips Lovecraft" [The Wounded Ego of Howard Phillips Lovecraft], Al Liamm, niv. 312 (Genver-C'hwevrer 1999), pp. 9–32
- "Baudelaire, diouganer an arz nevez" [Baudelaire, prophet of modern art], Al Liamm, niv. 316 (Gwengolo-Here 1999), pp. 62–70)
- "Ar Varzhed Touellet: Baudelaire, Mallarmé, Verlaine, Rimbaud" [Cheated Poets : Baudelaire, Mallarmé, Verlaine, Rimbaud], Al Liamm, niv. 322 (Gwengolo-Here 2000), pp. 53–77
- "Evezhiadennoù diwar-benn Nozvezh Arkuzh e beg an Enezenn" [Remarks on Night Wake at the point of the Island], Al Liamm, niv. 324 (C'hwevrer 2001), pp. 83–89
- "Saint-John Perse, barzh an Hollved" [Saint-John Perse, Poet of the Universal] Al Liamm, niv. 329 (Kerzu 2001), pp. 68–87
- "Cocteau hag an Doueed" [Cocteau and the Gods], Al Liamm, niv.334 (Here 2002), pp. 45–56
- "Renan hag ar brezhoneg", [Renan and the Breton Language] Al Liamm, niv. 335 (Kerzu 2002), pp. 83–89
- "Un diaraoger amerikan d'an Diveiz: Herman Melville (1819-1891)" [An American Forerunner of the Absurd : Herman Melville], Al Liamm, niv. 350 (Mezheven 2005), pp. 37–53

=== Uncollected poems ===
- "Serr noz er gouelec'h", Al Liamm, no 215 (1982), p. 331
- "Ar Steredenn du", Al Liamm, no 216 (1983), pp. 6 7
- "Eneoù 'zo", Al Liamm, no 258 (1990), p. 3
- "Pedenn", Al Liamm, no 284-285 (1994), pp. 193–194

== Bibliography ==
Articles and reviews about René Galand / Reun ar C'halan

- Symposium, Fall 1963, 235–236
- Revue d'Histoire Littéraire de la France, Mars-avril 1972, 332–333, Jan.-Fév. 1976, 141, Mars-avril 1988
- Modern Language Notes, vol. 89 (1974), 761–762
- Revue des Sciences Humaines, no 1 (1974), 182–183
- Etudes baudelairiennes, no VIII, 1976, 288–289
- World Literature Today, Spring 1981, Summer 1985, Spring 1987
- Gohier et Huon, Dictionnaire des écrivains d'aujourd'hui en Bretagne, 1980
- Le Peuple Breton, no 194 (1980), 29
- Breizh, no 253 (1980), 18–19, no 276 (1982)
- Brud Nevez, no 47 (1981), 42
- Dalc'homp soñj, no 12 (1985), 18
- Bremañ, no 100 (1990)
- Bro Nevez, Feb. 1990
- J. T. Koch, Celtic Culture: A Historical Encyclopedia (2006), 78
- F. Favereau, Lennegezh ar brezhoneg en XXvet kantved, vol. 5 (forthcoming)

== See also ==
- Breton American
- Reun ar C'halan
