= Tanguy Malmanche =

French writer

Tanguy Malmanche (7 September 1875 – 20 March 1953) was a French writer involved in the revival of Breton culture. His first name also appears as Tangi.

The son of Gustave Malmanche, a ship's purser based in Paris, and Marie Louise Piédalu, he was born Tanneguy Malmanche at Saint-Omer, where his mother's parents lived. He grew up in Brest, where he was exposed to Breton language and culture. His father's family had included several Brest mayors. Malmanche continued his studies at the Collège Stanislas de Paris. He studied law in Rennes and literature in Paris. Malmanche performed his military service in an infantry regiment at Brest. He worked with the railway, then in insurance, before establishing himself in Courbevoie as a master blacksmith. In 1912, he married Jeanne Briantais. He joined the army at Nantes in 1914, but later returned to Courbevoie to produce material for the army.

In 1903, he started a Breton journal Spered ar vro; only four issues were produced. From 1904 to 1905, he taught a class in the Breton language. He also published Le Memento du Bretonnant, manuel élémentaire et pratique de langue Bretonne which summarized the material covered in the course.

He died at Clichy-la-Garenne after suffering a hemiplegia at the age of 77.

== Works ==
Malmanche produced seven plays in French and Breton:

- Gurvan, le Chevalier étranger (Gurvan, Ar Marc'hek Estranjour)
- Les Païens (Ar Baganiz)
- La Vie de Salaün qu'ils nommèrent le fou (Buez Salaun Lesanvet ar Foll)
- Le Conte de l'âme qui a faim (Marvaill ann ene naounek)
- La veuve Arzur (An Intañvez Arzur)
- La femme du couvreur (Gwrek an toer)
- L'Antéchrist (An Antechrist)

In French, he produced:

- a novel La Tour de Plomb
- three stories: Kou le Corbeau, La Monstre de Landouzan and Suzanne Le Prestre
