= Tro Breizh =

Catholic pilgrimage

Tro Breizh (Breton for "Tour of Brittany") is a Catholic pilgrimage that links the towns of the seven founding saints of Brittany. These seven saints were Celtic monks from Britain from around the 5th or 6th century who brought Christianity to Armorica and founded its first bishoprics.

The tour originally was a month-long 600 km (370 mi) walking tour, but when relaunched in 1994 by Les Chemins du Tro Breizh ("The Paths of the Tro Breizh" in French), it was decided to limit the tour to one week-long stage every year, still following the original path:

== Path ==
- Quimper, Saint Corentin's town
- Saint-Pol-de-Léon, Saint Pol's town
- Tréguier, Saint Tudwal's town
- Saint-Brieuc, named after its founder Brioc
- Saint Malo, similarly named for Malo
- Dol, Samson of Dol's town
- Vannes, Saint Patern's town

A new guidebook in four parts called “Breizh ma Bro” is underway from enthusiasts of the Breton Association “Mon Tro Breizh” (my tour of Brittany) with the goal of covering the entire 1,500 kilometres of the pilgrims’ routes around the whole of Brittany [ www.montrobreizh.bzh ] “O! Breizh ma Bro” are Breton words taken from an old local hymn and mean “Oh Brittany my country”. The routes lead from one cathedral city to another and are detailed without any religious aspect being imposed on the reader. The first Guidebook is for Quimper to Saint-Pol-de –Léon and then Saint-Pol-de –Léon to Tréguier is available now, followed by the second guide in 2021: Tréguier to Saint Brieuc then to Saint Malo and then to Dol-de Bretagne. The third, for 2022: Dol-de-Bretagne to Rennes then to Vannes and then finally to Quimper again, with by 2024 the fourth for the routes linking Rennes to Nantes and Nantes to Vannes.

An old Breton legend says that those who do not complete the Tro Breizh in their lifetime will be sentenced to complete it in their afterlife, walking the length of the tour from within their coffin every seven years. Until the 16C tradition demanded that every Breton should make a pilgrimage at least once in his or her lifetime to the seven Cathedrals of Brittany. The “Tro Breizh”, or Tour of Brittany, as it was known, drew people in their thousands during the 12C to the 16C, with its popularity reaching a peak in the 14C; estimates suggest that crowds numbering up to 30,000 to 40,000 pilgrims were taking to the roads. The tour covered nearly 700 km / 435 mi, and it enabled the faithful to pay homage to the holy relics of the founding saints of Brittany: St Brieuc and St Malo at the towns of those names, St Samson at Dol de Bretagne, St Patern at Vannes, St Corentine at Quimper, St Paul the Aurelian at St Pol de Léon and St Tugdual at Tréguier. Whoever failed to carry out this duty was supposed to have to undertake the pilgrimage after death, advancing by one coffin-length every seven years... Today, ever increasing numbers make the same journey, in groups or alone, retracing the steps of the earlier pilgrims. See for example http://www.trobreiz.com/ and https://www.saintpoldeleon.fr The first writings mentioning the existence of these tours dates from the 13th century.

In 2002, after successfully completing the seven-year tour, the pilgrimage moved on to Wales, whence many of the bishops came.

== See also ==
- Blessed Julian Maunoir, "Apostle of Brittany"
