= Pêr Denez =

French linguist, lexicographer, scholar and writer

Pierre Denis, known also as Pêr Denez (3 February 1921 – 30 July 2011), was a French linguist, lexicographer, scholar and writer.

Denis was born in Rennes. Thanks to his contributions in the form of novels, essays and linguistics, he contributed to the preservation of the written Breton language. He died in Romillé.

== Publications ==
=== Fiction ===
- Glas evel daoulagad c'hlas na oant ket ma re, Al Liamm 1979, translated in English by Ian Press: Blue Like Blue Eyes Which Were Not My Own, Mouladurioù Hor Yezh 1993, ISBN 978-2-86863-068-1
- Hiroc'h eo an amzer eget ar vuhez, Mouladurioù Hor Yezh, 1981
- Evit an eil gwech, MHY, 1982
- Eus un amzer 'zo bet, MHY, 1992
- En tu all d'an douar ha d'an neñv, MHY, 1993
- Kenavo ar c'hentañ er joaioù, MHY, 1994
- An amzer a ra e dro 1995
- Da Rouz An Noz, MHY, 1996

== Poems ==
- P'emañ ar mor o regel..., Skrid, 1001

=== Linguistics and language methodology ===
- Kentelioù brezhoneg : eil derez, Al Liamm, 1971
- Brezhoneg buan hag aes, Omnivox, 1972 (reprinted by Hor Yezh, 1997; English edition tr. and adapted by R. Delaporte, Cork University Press, 1977, 1980)
- Étude structurale d'un parler breton : Douarnenez, thèse (3 vol.), Université de Rennes, 1977
- Geriadur brezhoneg Douarnenez, 4 vol., Mouladurioù Hor Yezh, 1980, 1981, 1985
- Mont war-raok gant ar brezhoneg, MHY, 1987

=== Articles and essays ===
In French

- Joseph Ollivier, Les contes de Luzel (Préface de Per Denez, suivie d'une Postface sur “Contes Bretons” Pur-Terre de Brume, 1994), Hor Yezh, 1995 ISBN 2-910699-11-0
- Bretagne et peuples d'Europe, MHY, 1999.

In Breton

- Yezh ha bro, MHY, 1998.

=== Diverse ===
- Korf an den Brest, Skridoù Breizh, 1943.

=== Translations ===
- Theodor Storm, Aquis submersus, Al Liamm, 1950

== Bibliography ==
- Bernard et Jacqueline Le Nail, Dictionnaire des romanciers de Bretagne, rubrique Per Denez, p. 80. Spézet, Keltia Graphic éditions, 1999, ISBN 2-913953-01-8
