= Xavier Grall =

Breton journalist and poet (1930–1981)

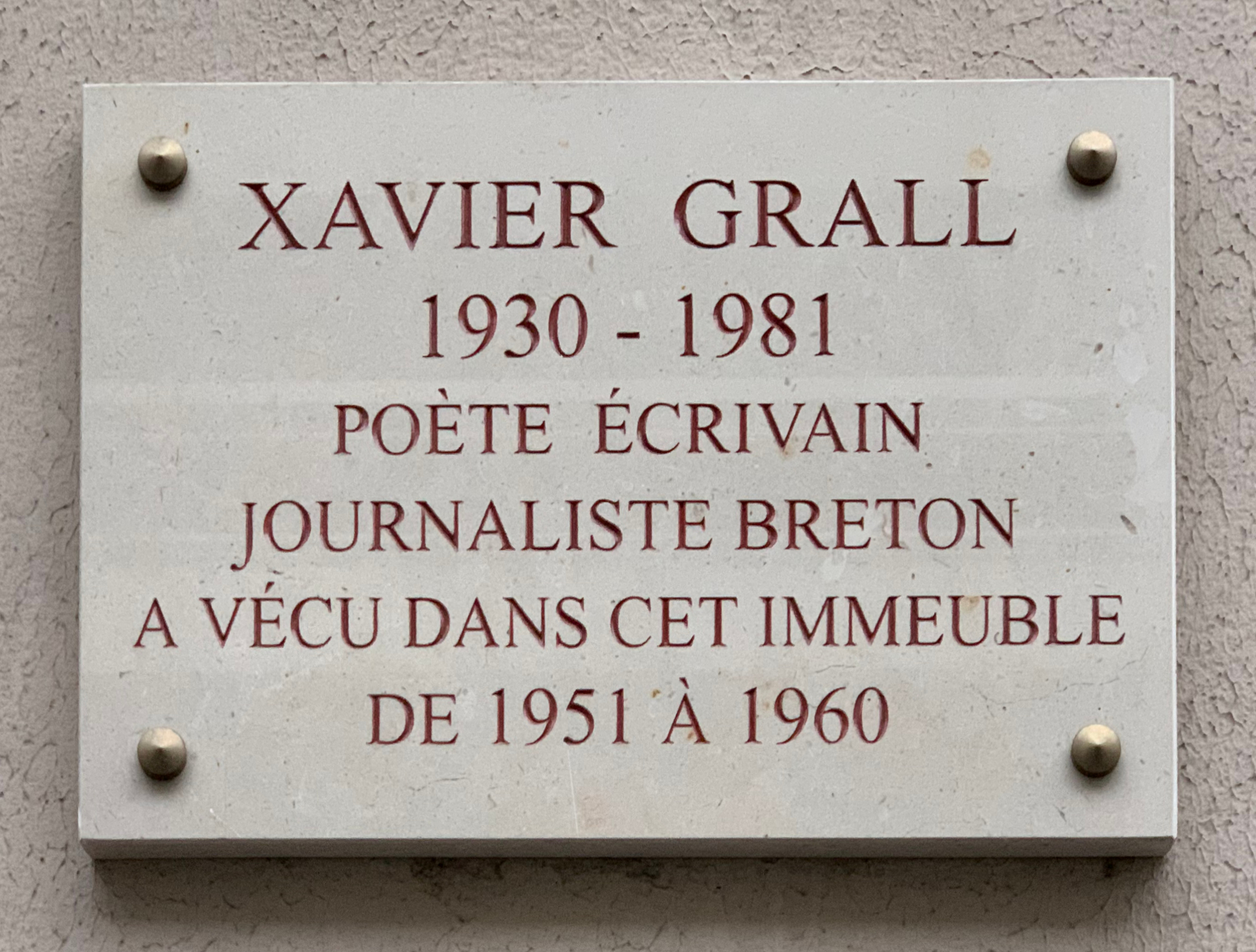
Plaque to Xavier Grall, 58 rue du Théâtre in Paris, where he lived between 1951 and 1960.

Xavier Grall (1930–1981) was a journalist and poet from Brittany, France, who was a strong advocate of Breton nationalism during the Third Emsav. His work glorifies a mystical Brittany.

== Early career ==
Xavier Grall was born in Landivisiau in Finistère, but moved to Paris. He worked as a journalist for Catholic publications, including the journals La Vie catholique, of which he was editor, and Témoignage chrétien. He also wrote for Le Monde and Bretagne.

== Bretonism ==
Grall rediscovered his Breton identity in the 1970s, leaving Paris permanently in 1973, returning to Brittany to live at Bossulan Farm in Nizon, just outside Pont-Aven. Grall's reassertion of Breton identity followed a period of disillusionment with France following the Algerian War. He later wrote that the war undermined his belief in the idea of France:

I had done the Algerian War, in the wolfish sun my eyes were opened. Heartbreaking revelation. From Djebel Amour [in Algeria] to Montagnes Noires [in Brittany], there were similarities. Same tyrant: the French state. Same victim: the peasant. Same cops: CRS .... When we saw France torture, we could not put that song on the level to which we'd been lulled .... The image of France that I had formed, very high and almost mystical, found itself forever tarnished.

In response he defined himself as Breton in opposition to French identity:

You discover Bretonness as it is not allowed to be. ... And you think that your country does exist, dear God, terribly. You recover. You look straight ahead. You are decolonized. You are Berber, Kabyle, Breton.

From this point on his work emphasises a multicultural ideal, building a unique example of Breton literature in French.

== Activism ==
With his friends Alain Guel and the protest singer Glenmor, he founded éditions Kelenn, where he published Barde imaginé (1968), Keltia Blues (1971), La Fête de la nuit (1972) and Rires et pleurs de l'Aven (1978). Alain Guel, who followed his early steps in literature, and kept up a voluminous correspondence with him, gave him support and friendship throughout his life.

Reconnecting with his past as a columnist, Grall published Le Cheval couché (the lounging horse), a scathing response to Pierre-Jakez Hélias's popular autobiographical novel Cheval d'orgueil (Horse of Pride), which he called "fossilized folkism". He also vilified earlier Breton poets and singers, notably Theodore Botrel, whom he described as the creator of a "pitiable" image of Brittany born "from the depths of his idiocy". Botrel later expressed regret for having written the book.

Grall continued to work from a distance for Le Monde and La Vie catholique. He published pamphlets and occasional pieces; Le Billet d'Olivier presented his passions and his moods on current topics. He also wrote essays on François Mauriac, James Dean and others.

In the early 1970s, Grall founded the Breton separatist newspaper Le Nation bretonne with Alain Guel and Glenmor, where he published lyrics under the pseudonym of "Saint HERBOTS", among others.

He died in Quimperlé in 1981.

== Commemorations ==
A bronze sculpture to his memory stands on the Promenade Xavier Grall, on the banks of the river Aven in Pont-Aven.

Each year in Carhaix a Festival des Vieilles Charrues bears his name.

A literary prize was created in his name at the Festival de la Parole Poétique (Pays de Quimperlé). Le Prix Xavier-Grall is awarded to a poet for his life's work. Recipients have included:

- Jean-Paul Kermarrec in 2006.
- Jacqueline Saint-Jean in 2007
- Marie-Josée Christien in 2009
- Alain Jégou in 2008
- Pierre Colin in 2010

== Publications ==
- James Dean et notre jeunesse, 1958
- Mauriac journaliste, 1960
- La génération du Djebel, 1962
- Africa blues, 1962
- Cantiques à Mélilla, 1964
- Le rituel breton, 1965
- Barde imaginé, Éditions Kelenin, 1968
- Keltia Blues, Éditions Kelenin, 1971
- Glenmor, 1972
- La fête de la nuit, Éditions Kelenin, 1972
- Rires et pleurs de l'Aven, Éditions Kelenin, 1978
- La Sône des pluies et des tombes, Éditions Kelenn 1976
- Le Cheval couché, 1977
- Stèle pour Lamennais, 1978
- Entendras-tu le vent chanter dans le grand chêne ?, 1979
- Si loin de toi, Tristan…, 1979
- Arthur Rimbaud, la marche au soleil, 1980
- Solo et autres poèmes, 1981
- Genèse et derniers poèmes, 1982
- La marche des calvaires
- Les vents m'ont dit, 1982
- Et parlez-moi de la terre..., 1983
- L'Inconnu me dévore, Calligrammes, 1984
- Les billets d'Olivier, éditions Calligrammes, 1985
- Chroniques de l'Indien I et II, 1995 et 1996
- Mémoires de ronces et de galets, 2002. Textes donnés à la revue Sav Breizh. An Here. 2002
- Au nom du père. Recueil de textes parus dans La Vie An Here. 2003, 486 p.
- Œuvre Poétique, éditions Rougerie, 2010
