= Guillaume de Saint-André =

Guillaume de Saint-André (fl. 14th century) was the secretary and biographer of John IV of Brittany.

== Bibliography ==
- Histoire de Jean de Bretagne (in verse)
