= François Falcʼhun =

French linguist

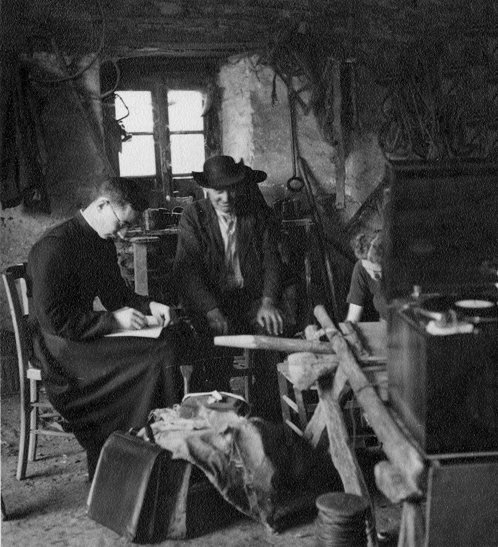
- Falcʼhun recording a song in 1939
- Born: 20 April 1901; Bourg-Blanc, Brittany, France
- Died: 13 January 1991 (aged 81); Bourg-Blanc, Brittany, France
- Citizenship: French
- Occupation: Linguist

Academic background
- Education: École pratique des hautes études

François Falcʼhun (20 April 1901 – 13 January 1991) was a French linguist known for his theories about the origin of the Breton language. He was also an ordained Canon in the Catholic clergy.

Falcʼhun was professor at the Universities of Rennes and Brest. Contrary to the mainstream opinion of linguists, Falcʼhun took the view that Breton was derived from the Gaulish form of Continental Celtic, rather than from the Brythonic Celtic that were introduced by British migrants. He was accused of using linguistics to promote a French nationalist political agenda.

== Theories ==
Falcʼhun's early work included an edition of the writings of Jean-Marie Perrot. He created a particular Breton orthography (known as "university" orthography) which was intended to replace the spelling system known as "Peurunvan", used from 1911 to 1941. His spelling, which does not use "zh", also abandons the Breton "cʼh" convention, introduced in the seventeenth century, and which is even used in the official French form of Falcʼhun's own name.

In 1951 Falcʼhun developed his view that Breton developed from native Gaulish, arguing that the incoming Britons encountered a Gaulish-speaking rather than Latin-speaking population, and that the two variants of Celtic merged. Criticising the views of Joseph Loth and Léon Fleuriot, Falcʼhun claimed that the Vannetais dialect of eastern Breton was almost wholly Gaulish. "I am convinced that the dialect of Vannes, especially in southern Blavet, is a Gallic survival, little influenced by British contributions, and other dialects are simply Gaulish marked by the language of origin of the island immigrants".

== Controversy ==
Falcʼhun's views became controversial after the publication of his 1981 book, Perspectives nouvelles sur l’histoire de la langue bretonne (New Perspectives on the History of the Breton Language), in which his theories were linked to nationalist ideology. It was published in a series entitled "The nation in question", as part of several texts entitled "the critical national ideology of...". These books were published in the context of a struggle against Breton nationalism, which sought to emphasise that the Bretons were non-French. Because of this, Falcʼhun became a hate figure among Breton nationalists. According to his friend Françoise Morvan, he suffered numerous "telephone harassment campaigns".

Léon Fleuriot has accepted Falcʼhun's view that Breton was influenced by surviving local forms of Celtic, but rejects Falcʼhun's argument that Vannetais is native Gaulish.

== Publications ==
- Le système consonantique du breton avec une étude comparative de phonétique expérimentale - Thèse présentée à la faculté des Lettres de l'université de Rennes, Rennes, imp. Réunies, imp. Plihon, 1951
- Préface de l'ouvrage "L'abbé Jean-Marie Perrot", du chanoine Henri Poisson, Édition Plihon (1955).
- Un texte breton inédit de Dom Michel Le Nobletz. (Extrait des annales de Bretagne). Rennes, imprimerie réunies, 1958
- Histoire de la Langue bretonne d'après la géographie linguistique - T. I : Texte - T. II : figures Paris, P.U.F. -1963
- Les noms de lieux celtiques. Première série : vallées et plaines. Rennes, Editions Armoricaine, 1966, Deuxième série : Problèmes de doctrine et de méthode - noms de hauteur. Rennes, Éditions Armoricaines, 1970
- Perspectives nouvelles sur l'histoire de la langue bretonne. Paris, Union Générale d'Éditions, 1981
- Les noms de lieux celtiques. Première série : vallées et plaines. Deuxième édition, revue et considérablement augmentée. Genève (ville)|Genève, Slatkine. 1982. with Bernard Tanguy.
- Les noms de lieux celtiques. Troisième série : Nouvelle Méthode de Recherche en Toponymie Celtique 1984. with Bernard Tanguy.
