= Glenmor =

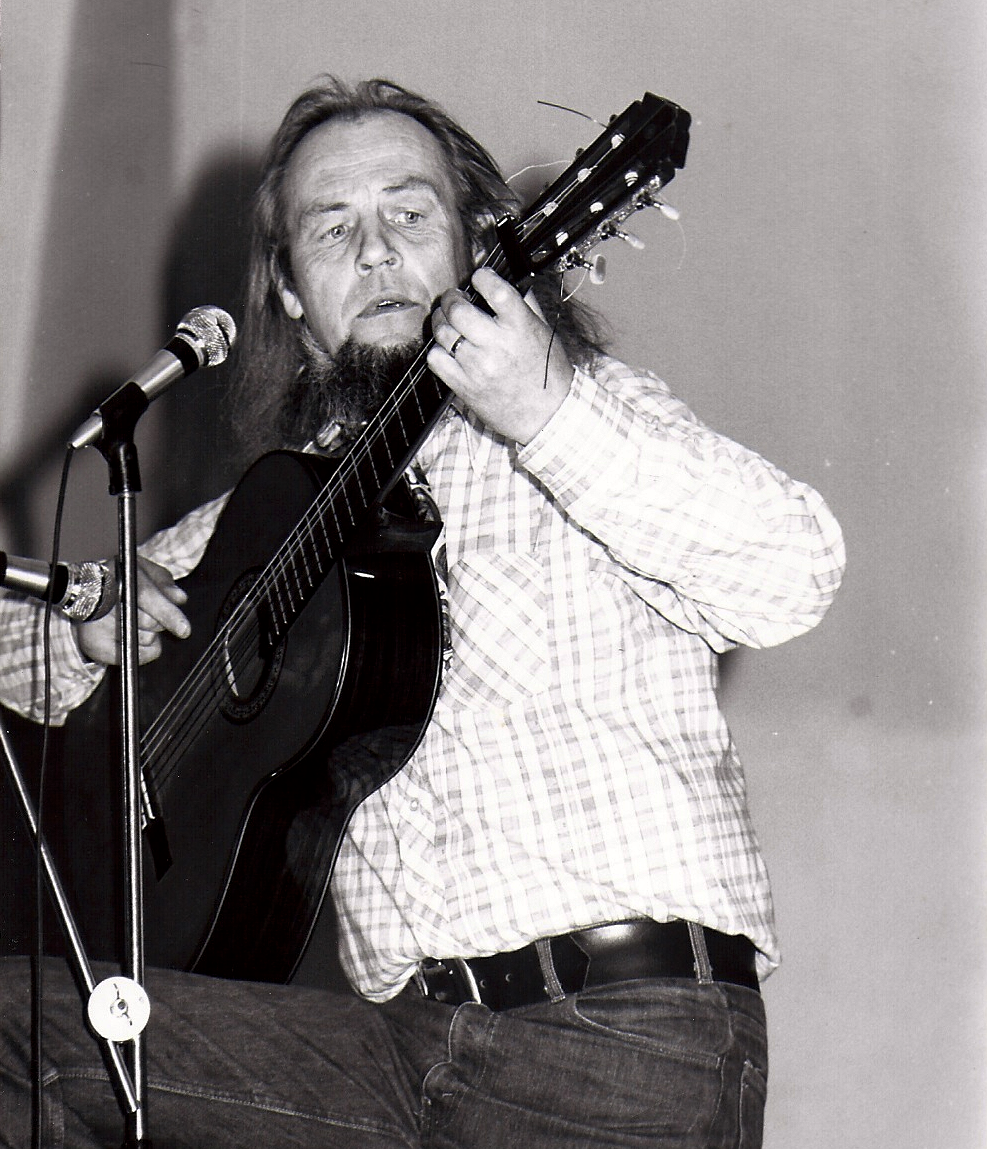

Background information
- Birth name: Emile le Scanf
- Also known as: Milig Ar Skañv
- Born: 25 June 1931; Mael-Carhaix, Brittany, France
- Died: 18 June 1996 (aged 64)
- Genres: Folk, protest
- Occupation(s): Musician, songwriter
- Instrument(s): Vocals, guitar
- Years active: 1959–1990
- Labels: Barclay

Glenmor was the stage name of Emile Le Scanf (1931–1996), a Breton protest singer and poet who sought to preserve the Breton language and adapt local traditions of folk singing to the radical culture of the 1960s and 70s. He is also known by the Breton name Milig Ar Skañv.

== Early career ==
Emile Le Scanf was born in 1931 at Mael-Carhaix. In 1941, he entered the small seminary in Quintin. After his military service in Paris, he obtained a licence de philosophie at Rennes in 1952. He then travelled extensively in Italy, Greece, Turkey, Yugoslavia and Soviet Union until 1954. During this period he began writing and composing.

His musical career really began in 1959 with a recital in Paris before a small audience. He later released his first album as "Glenmor", Glenmor à la Mutualité. His stage name was derived from words for land (glen) and sea (mor) in Breton. His distinctive style led to popularity.

His songs aggressively asserted the unique cultural identity of Brittany. He portrayed himself as a political radical with anti-clerical and anarchist views. He wore a beard and his hair long, in a revival of the traditional Breton peasant style.

== Activism ==
Actively engaged in Breton nationalism, Glenmor wrote the song le Kan bale lu poblek Breizh, later renamed Kan bale an ARB, which was the marching song of the ARB (Armée Révolutionnaire Bretonne; Breton Revolutionary Army). In June 1979, he participated in a hunger strike to protest against the detention of a Breton activist arrested following an attack against the Chateau of Versailles.

With his friends Alain Guel and Xavier Grall, he helped found the publishing house "Kelenn", where in 1968 he published Le Livre des Chansons. A few years later Grall published Barde imaginé and La fête de la nuit (1972), works in which Glenmor is the main character, in the fictionalised form of the bard "Arzel". In the early 1970s he, Grall and Guel founded the newspaper la Nation bretonne, which was influential on the Breton intellectual elite.

In 1977, he appeared in Pierre Perrault's film C'etait un Québécois en Bretagne, madame! along with fellow Breton nationalist Meavenn. Both are portrayed as "poets of dispossession, the voices of a despairing national identity." Glenmor describes himself in the film as an "oral journalist with opinions".

In 1978, he was designated "Breton of the Year" by Armor Magazine. In 1990 he retired from performance to devote himself to writing.

He was decorated with the Order of the Ermine in 1990. He died six years later on 18 June 1996. Several thousand people attended his funeral in Mael-Carhaix . The tomb is inscribed with the words, "Émile LE SCANV (1931-1996) Et voici bien ma terre, la vallée de mes amours. Glenmor".

== Discography ==
- GLENMOR single
- Quatre Chansons en Breton single Ed. Sked
- GLENMOR single Ed. Kornog
- KATTELL dit GLENMOR : Poèmes album Ed. Ternel
- KATTELL dit GLENMOR : Poèmes album Ed. Ternel
- GLENMOR A LA MUTUALITE album Ed. Ternel
- Cinq Chansons en Breton single Ed. Barclay
- Les Temps de la Colère single Ed. Barclay
- CET AMOUR-LA album Ed. Barclay
- HOMMAGE A MORVAN LEBESQUE album
- VIVRE album Ed. Le Chant du Monde LDX 74481
- PRINCES ENTENDEZ BIEN album Ed. Le Chant du Monde LDX 74503
- OUVREZ LES PORTES DE LA NUIT album Ed. le Chant du Monde
- E DIBENN MIZ GWENGOLO album Ed. Le Chant du Monde
- TOUS CES VINGT ANS DEJA... album Ed. Le Chant du Monde
- La Coupe et la Mémoire album Ed. Ar Folk
- TRISTAN CORBIERE : Le Paria dit par Glenmor album Ed. Ar Folk
- Si tu ne chantais pas pour eux à quoi bon demeurer album Ed. Stern Ha Lugern
- Après la Fleur le Fruit sous la Rose l'Épine album Ed. Escalibur
- EN BRETAGNE, NOCES ET FEST-NOZ album Ed. Barclay
- LES PRINCIPALES OEUVRES CD Prod. Ar Folk, Escalibur, Coop Breizh
- AN DISTRO "Et voici bien ma Terre..." CD Ed. Coop Breizh
- AN DISTRO "Ouvrez les Portes de la Nuits" CD Ed. Coop Breizh
- AN DISTRO "Apocaplypse" CD Ed. Coop Breizh
- HOMMAGE A GLENMOR CD Coop Breizh CD KAD 01 (2000)

== Writings ==
- Livre des Chansons (Mutualité 67), éd. Kelenn, 1969, second edition, Stern ha Lugern, 1979
- Livre des Chansons, tome II (Bobino 73), éd. Ternel
- Sables et Dunes, éd. Ternel, 1971
- La Septième Mort, éd. Ternel, 1974, second edition, Libres Halliers, 1982
- Le Sang nomade, éd. Ternel, 1975
- Les emblaves et la moisson, éd. Stern ha Lugern, 1977
- Retraites paysannes, with typography and wood engravings by Claude Huart, éd. Ternel, 1977
- L'Homme du dernier jour, La Gacilly, éd. Artus, 1992
- Les Derniers Feux de la Vallée, Spézet, éd. Coop Breizh, 1995
- La Sanguine, Spézet, éd. Coop Breizh, 1996
- La Férule, Spézet, éd. Coop Breizh, 1997
- Xavier Grall in memoriam, Babel, 2000
- Kan ha diskan, Correspondences Grall-Glenmor, Spézet, Coop Breizh, 2007
