= Sked =

Sked is shortened version of the word schedule. It can refer to a flight schedule, a baseball schedule, or any other type of schedule. In the context of amateur radio a sked is a pre-arranged or scheduled contact between ham radio operators. In boating, a sked is a pre-arranged check-in via VHF radio with a monitoring agency (rescue, fishing or other) while undertaking a long journey or when at sea for a longer than normal time. This is done for safety purposes to enable a search to start early if something untoward happens.

A sked is a pocket-sized bifold or trifold schedule about the size of a baseball card printed for a sports team. Typically, a team logo or an image associated with the team (a player or the stadium or arena, for example) appears on the front, one or more sponsors are listed on the back. Inside is a listing of the season's home and away games. Some older schedules are just a single card with only the schedule on it, or more commonly with a picture or logo on the front and the schedule on the back.

Skeds are collected as sports memorabilia, trading heavily enough on eBay to merit a category. Older schedules are like individual works of art, many featuring beautiful artwork, logos and pictures of many stars and hall of fame players. Often variations are available with different sponsors. Schedules can also be quite scarce. Most were put in a wallet and seldom survived past that season, and quantities produced are a lot lower than Topps or Upper Deck baseball cards. This makes them desirable as a collectible since many baseball card collectors feel that current baseball card production rates are too high.

== Sked collecting ==
The first reference to sports schedule collecting may be in The Sports Collectors Bible (1979). Collectors tend to use the moniker "skedder" to identify themselves. Many collectors first realized there were others who collected schedules when they saw ads in the back of Sports publications, advertising schedules for sale or schedules that advertisers were looking for. Collectors began to publish newsletters focused solely on schedules that were distributed to other collectors. Newsletters were made up of sked lists by sport, editorial pieces, and ads from Skedders about schedules they had for sale or trade or schedules they were in search of.
