= Léon Fleuriot =

French linguist and Celtic scholar (1923–1987)

- Born: 5 April 1923; Morlaix, Brittany, France
- Died: 15 March 1987 (aged 63); Paris, France
- Citizenship: French
- Occupation: Linguist
- Known for: Studies of Old Breton; Les origines de la Bretagne

Academic background
- Education: University of Paris

Léon Fleuriot (5 April 1923 – 15 March 1987) was a French linguist and Celtic scholar. He specialised in the Celtic languages, above all in Old Breton, and in the history of Gallo-Roman and early medieval Brittany.

== Life and career ==
Fleuriot was born at Morlaix in Brittany on 5 April 1923, into a family from the district of Quintin, and learned Breton in his youth. He passed the agrégation in history in 1950 and taught in lycées and collèges in Paris and its suburbs and at the Prytanée National Militaire at La Flèche.

He joined the Centre national de la recherche scientifique (CNRS) in 1958 and took his doctorate at the University of Paris in 1964, with a thesis on the grammar of Old Breton and a complementary thesis on its glosses. In 1966 he was appointed to the chair of Celtic studies at the University of Rennes 2 – Upper Brittany, while also serving as directeur d'études at the École pratique des hautes études in Paris.

He died in Paris on 15 March 1987, aged 63. At the time of his death he was president of the editorial board of the journal Études Celtiques.

== Work ==
Fleuriot's early work was devoted to Old Breton. His grammar Le vieux breton: éléments d'une grammaire and his Dictionnaire des gloses en vieux breton, both published in 1964, became standard works of reference, and he returned to the subject in a two-volume A Dictionary of Old Breton, written with Claude Evans.

In Les origines de la Bretagne (1980) Fleuriot argued that Armorica had been settled from Britain in two successive waves. He held that Breton was the language of these British settlers. On this point he differed from François Falc'hun, who regarded Breton as essentially a survival of continental Gaulish overlaid by the speech of the incomers. Fleuriot none the less accepted that Breton had absorbed surviving local Celtic forms.

Fleuriot also worked on the Gaulish language. He was one of the editors of the Larzac lead tablet, a long Gaulish inscription published in 1985.

== Selected works ==
- Le vieux breton: éléments d'une grammaire. Paris: Klincksieck, 1964.
- Dictionnaire des gloses en vieux breton. Paris: Klincksieck, 1964.
  - A Dictionary of Old Breton - Dictionnaire du vieux breton: Historical and Comparative, in two parts. 2 vols. Toronto: Prepcorp, 1985. Part A reprints the '64 edn. while part B is a condensed, English-language version with some supplemental material.
- Les origines de la Bretagne: l'émigration. Paris: Payot, 1980.
- Récits et poèmes celtiques: domaine brittonique, VIe–XVe siècles. Paris: Stock, 1981.
- With Michel Lejeune, Pierre-Yves Lambert, Robert Marichal and Alain Vernhet. Le plomb magique du Larzac et les sorcières gauloises. Paris: CNRS, 1985.
- With Claude Evans. A Dictionary of Old Breton / Dictionnaire du vieux breton: Historical and Comparative. 2 vols. Toronto: Prepcorp, 1985.
- L'histoire littéraire et culturelle de la Bretagne. Vol. 1. Paris/Geneva, 1993.
- Notes lexicographiques et philologiques, edited by Gwennolé Le Menn. Saint-Brieuc: Skol, 1997 (posthumous).

== Legacy ==
A memorial volume, Bretagne et pays celtiques: langues, histoire, civilisation. Mélanges offerts à la mémoire de Léon Fleuriot, edited by Gwennolé Le Menn and Jean-Yves Le Moing, appeared at Saint-Brieuc and Rennes in 1992.
