= Yves Lainé =

Breton lawyer, politician and writer

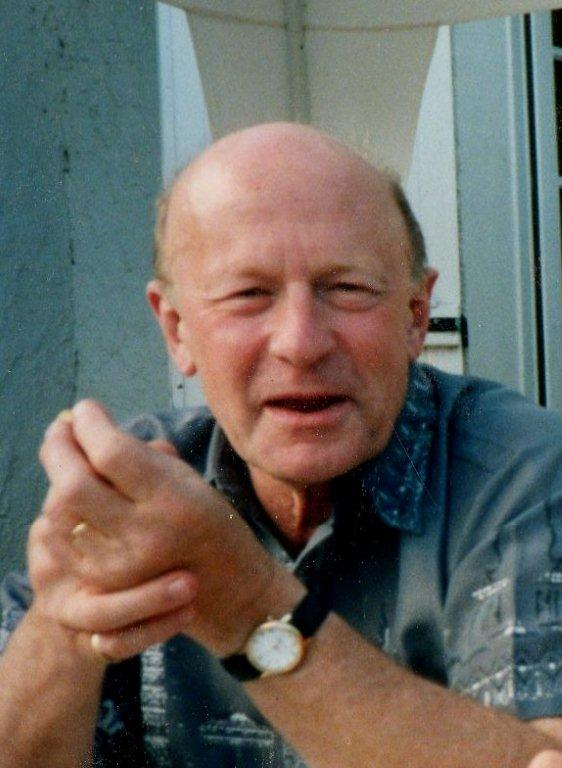
Yves Lainé in 2001

Yves Lainé (born 1937) is a Breton lawyer, politician and corporate executive manager, now a writer, arguing for the return of Loire-Atlantique departement in the administrative région of Brittany the reunification and devolution of the historical Brittany.

Born in 1937 in Nantes, he was a director of CELIB (Committee of Breton Interests) and worked as a director of the Nantes-Saint Nazaire Port Authority and Brittany Ferries. He founded the B5 association (B for Brittany and 5 for the 5 Breton departements : Finistère, Côtes-d'Armor, Morbihan, Ille-et-Vilaine and Loire-Atlantique) and also the vice president of Bretagne Réunie. He wrote L'ambition de Bretagne d'un Nantais in 2002. He is honorary chairman the Breton writers' association, ex-chairman of The Law and Institutions Department in the Institut Culturel de Bretagne (Skol Uhel ar Vro in Breton language). With another Nantes lobby les Transbordés he proposes to rebuild a new hi-tech transporter bridge in the port within the frames of a Vernian loop (Jules Verne), open for tourism . A large 8 mths debate held by Nantes métropole on the maritime destiny of the town ended in September 2015 and approved many proposals made by Lainé.

== Awards ==
2012, Received the collar of the Breton Ermine order (ordre de l'Hermine). In June 12013 he was elected Chancellor of this Order.

== Writings ==
- Europe rends nous la mer (Europe give us back the sea) Sea-trade policy. Essay Ed.CELIB 1972
- 1973-1993: vingt ans de navigation Brittany Ferries. Des romantiques aux leaders, Revue du Nord, 1995
- L'ambition de Bretagne d'un Nantais (A Nantais's ambition for Brittany), Essay, Petit Véhicule 2002 ISBN 2-84273-316-9
- Désenclavement, un commencement ou une fin ?, in : Fanch Élégoët, Bretagne 2000, Plabennec, Tud Ha Bro, 1986, p. 75-97.
- De la pertinence de sociétés duales (Relevance of a dual society) Contribution World Human Rights Forum 2004 - On line at PlanetAgora.com
- Les ailes et le sang (Wings and blood) Historical novel about war 1914-18 Cheminement 2006; ISBN 978-2-84478-496-4
- Zouave & communard Historical novel 1870 Cheminement 2008
- Jean-Marie, Chouan de Bretagne (Jean-Marie, Insurgeant in Brittany) Historical novel 1800-1840 Ecrituriales 2012 ISBN 978-2-919125-13-5
- Bretonnitude et autres celt'attitudes sur fond de Brexit . Essay Ecrituriales 2017 ISBN 978-2-919125-99-9

== See also ==
- Reunification of Brittany
- Breton nationalism
