= Youenn Gwernig =

French writer (1925–2006)

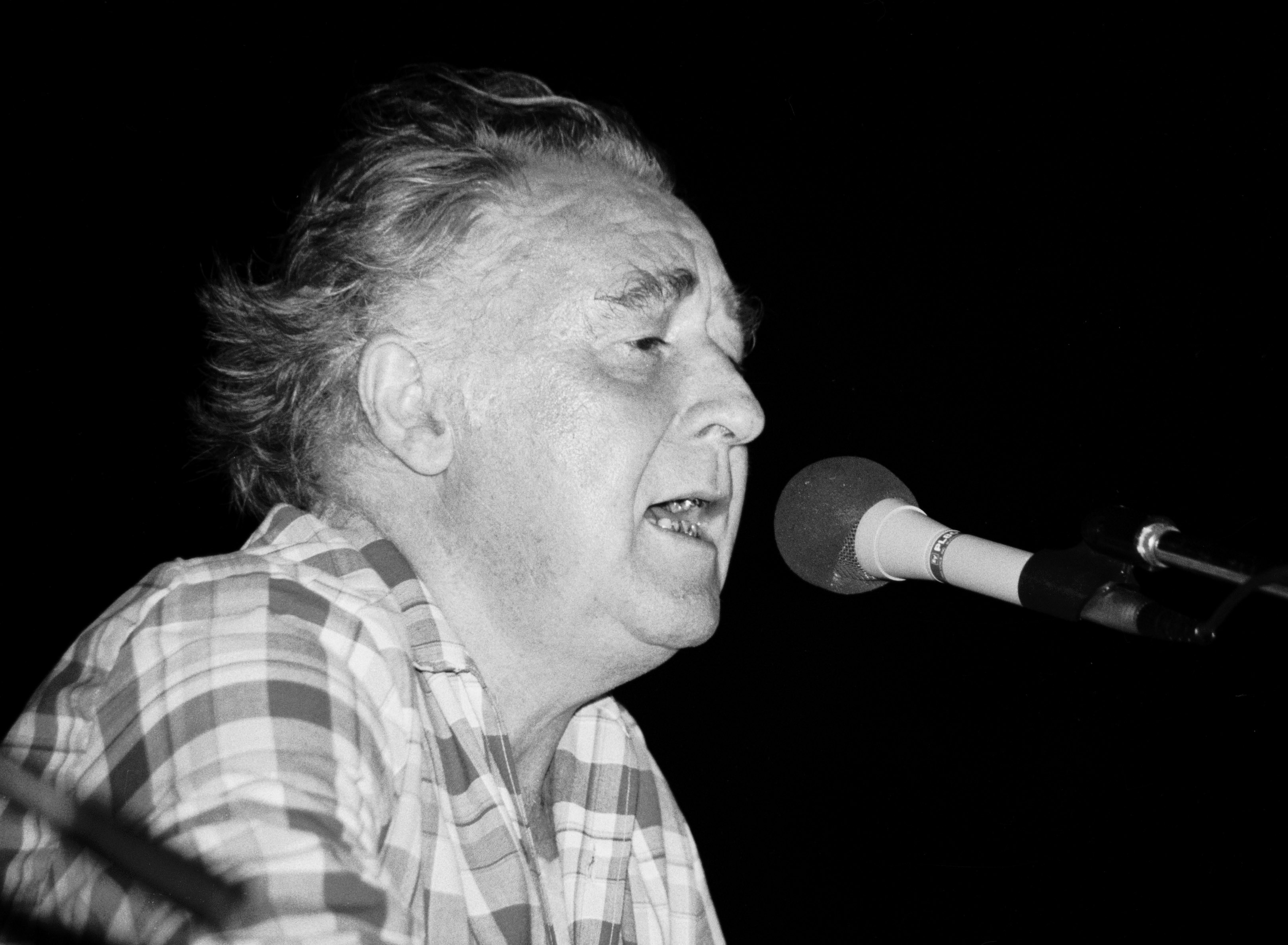
- Gwernig performing at Plouvorn in 1982.
- Born: Yves Guernic; 10 May 1925; Scaër, France
- Died: 29 August 2006 (aged 81); Douarnenez, France
- Citizenship: France, United States
- Occupations: Poet; Singer-songwriter

Youenn Gwernig (10 May 1925 – 29 August 2006) was a French-American poet, writer, singer and TV presenter on the French channel France 3.

== Early life ==
He was born on 10 May 1925 in the town of Scaër, in Brittany, France.

He first worked as a wood sculptor. In the early 1950s he met the Breton poet and singer Glenmor, with whom he set a music band called Breizh a gan which was the first cultural Breton band after World War II. This band set an operetta called Genovefa.

== Life ==
He moved to the United States in 1957 with his two daughters.

From 1961, he regularly visited the West Side neighbourhood of New York City and met the Beat Generation writers there. He became a friend of Jack Kerouac and lived in the Bronx, where he wrote some bilingual poems in Breton and in English about New York or his nostalgy of Brittany in an American big city, as Un dornad plu ("A handful of feathers", 1961) or War ribl ar stêr Harlem ("On the bank of Harlem river", August 1963). In 1968, he wrote a poems' collection called New York City blues.

In the 1997's Al Liamm edition of Un dornad plu, Youenn Gwernig explained why he used to write his poems in Breton and to translate them in English :

"Meeting with Jack Kerouac in 1965, for instance, was a decisive turn. Since he could not speak Breton he asked me : "Would you not write some of your poems in English, I'd really like to read them !..." So I wrote an Diri Dir - Stairs of Steel for him, and kept on doing so. That's why I often write my poems in Breton, French and English."

He used to send his poems to the Breton magazine Al Liamm.

He returned to Brittany in 1969 with his wife (Suzig) and his daughters (Annaïg, Gwenola and Marie). He moved to Locmaria-Berrien and worked with Patrick Ewen and Gérard Delahaye.

In 1972, he published a collection of poetry called An Toull en nor.

He released the album Distro ar Gelted ("Come back the Celtic people") in 1974. He became famous with his song E-kreiz an noz ("In the middle of the night").

He wrote a novel in French in 1982, La grande tribu ("The great tribe" in French language), where he described his life in the USA.

In 1990 his album Emañ ar bed va iliz ("The world is my church") was released.

He died in 2006.

== Discography ==
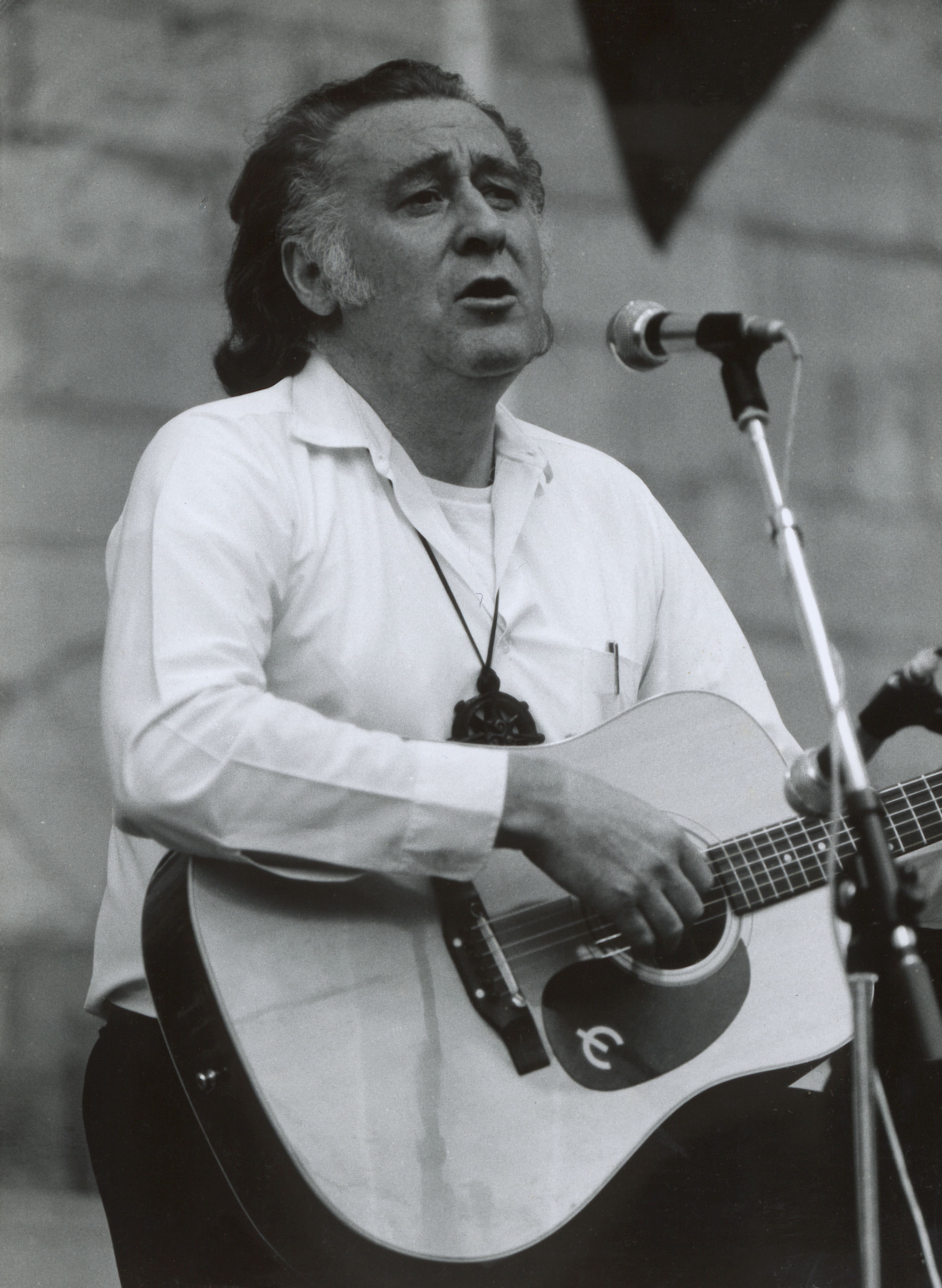
Youenn Gwernig singing

- 1971 : Les bougnoules - Gavotte du joint ("The Arabs - The Joint's dance" in french)
- 1973 : Ni hon unan! - Tap da sac'h ("We, ourselves ! - Get your bag" in Breton)
- 1974 : Distro ar Gelted ("Come back the Celt people" in Breton), LP Arfolk
- 1975 : E-kreiz an noz ("In the middle of the night" in Breton), LP Velia
- 1979 : Youenn Gwernig, Private People, LP
- 1990 : Emañ ar bed va iliz ("The world is my church" in Breton), CD
- 1994 : Foeter Bro / Just a traveller / Compagnon de route, CD
- 2003 : Identity, Coop Breizh (Best of)

== Books ==
- An toull en nor (bilingual breton-english, litt. The door's hole), Ar Majenn éditions, 1972.
- An diri dir / Les escaliers d’acier / Stairs of steel (trilingual Breton-French-English), Ar Majenn éditions, 1976.
- La grande tribu, (French, The great Tribe) Grasset,1982.
- Un dornad plu / A handful of feathers (Breton and English), Al Liamm, 1997.
- Appelez-moi Ange (French, Call me angel) ), Blanc Silex, 2002.
- Kerouac city blues with Jacques Josse, Daniel Biga, Alain Jégou...

== Notes ==
=== Bibliography ===
- Gorgiard, Ronan (2008), L'étonnante scène musicale bretonne, Culture et patrimoine (in French), Plomelin: Palantines, ISBN 978-2-911434-98-3
