= Rhisiart Tal-e-bot =

Welsh activist (born 1975)

- Born: Richard Stewart Talbot; 1975 (age 50–51); Merthyr Tydfil, Wales
- Occupations: Political activist; lecturer; language expert
- Known for: General secretary of the Celtic League

Rhisiart Tal-e-bot is a Welsh activist, Early Years lecturer who has been General Secretary of the Celtic League since 2006 and editor of Carn magazine since 2013. He is also the former president of the European Free Alliance Youth.

== Celtic League ==
Tal-e-bot has been a long time member of the Celtic League, taking part in various campaigns, and writing articles for Carn since 2004. In 2006 he was elected by the annual general meeting of the League to be general secretary. In 2013 he was also chosen to be the new editor of Carn.

=== General Secretary ===
As general secretary, Tal-e-bot has pushed for greater representation of the Celtic League on international bodies. This culminated in the League securing NGO (Non-governmental organisation) status with the United Nations, an achievement former general secretary Bernard Moffat credits Tal-e-bot with.

Tal-e-bot has also led campaigns against the UK Government's now scrapped regional spatial strategies.

=== Editor of Carn ===
Under his editorship Carn has undergone several changes. Both printing and publishing of the magazine have moved from Ireland to Cornwall and it now has a glossy cover.

== Institute for Cultural Relations Policy ==
Tal-e-bot has been a member of the advisory board for the Institute for Cultural Relations Policy since 2012. The ICRP is a non-governmental and non-profit organisation for the fostering of scientific education and public discourse regarding cultural relations policy based in Budapest, Hungary.

== Politics ==
=== Mebyon Kernow ===
As part of Mebyon Kernow, Tal-e-bot co-founded the youth branch Mebyon Kernow Bagas Yowynk, later KernowX. In 2013 he stood, unsuccessfully, for election to Camborne Town Council.

=== European Free Alliance ===
From 2007 to 2009, representing KernowX, Tal-e-bot became president of European Free Alliance Youth, the youth wing of the European Free Alliance, the European party of which Mebyon Kernow is a member. In 2010 he spoke at the EFA's general assembly in Venice on his experience as president.

== Movyans Skolyow Meythrin ==
Movyans Skolyow Meythrin (MSM), meaning Nursery Schools Movement in the Cornish language, was set up by Tal-e-bot in 2009. Based at Cornwall College in Camborne it aims to teach children through the medium of Cornish. Tal-e-bot is Director of MSM.

=== Skol dy'Sadorn Kernewek ===
Starting in 2009 Skol dy'Sadorn Kernewek provided a Saturday nursery school for young children as well as Cornish lessons for parents at the same time.

=== Keur Kernewek ===
In 2012 Tal-e-bot produced Keur Kernewek, a CD of songs in Cornish aimed at children aged under 5. This was done with the help of Gorsedh Kernow, Redruth Town Council, DBS Music, the Cornish Language Partnership and Cornish rock group Hanterhir, who produced some of the tracks, and Plymouth University students at Cornwall College gave assistance. There are 45 tracks of short Cornish songs on the CD with a booklet of lyrics in Cornish and English.

=== Skol Veythrin Karenza ===
Skol Veythrin Karenza, set up by MSM in 2013, is to be the first full-time Cornish language nursery school with Ofsted registered status.
