= Alan Heusaff =

Breton nationalist

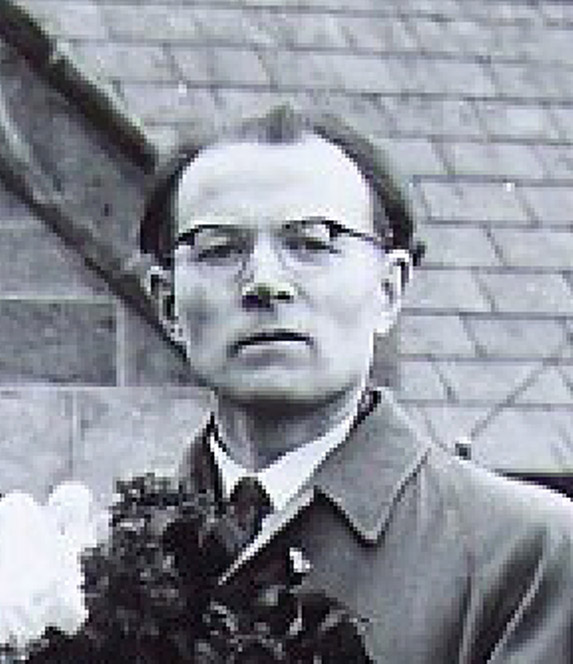
- Born: 23 July 1921; Saint-Yvi
- Died: 3 November 1999 (aged 78); Galway
- Awards: (1993)

Alan Heusaff, also Alan Heussaff (born Pierre Alain Marie Heusaff, 23 July 1921 in Saint-Yvi, Finistère – died 3 November 1999 in Galway) was a Breton nationalist, linguist, dictionary compiler, prolific journalist and lifetime campaigner for solidarity between the Celtic peoples. A co-founder of the Celtic League in 1961, he was its first general secretary until 1984. Professionally, his career was spent in the Irish met service as an aviation meteorologist (1952-1986).

A native Breton speaker, he trained as a primary school teacher but in his early twenties joined the separatist Bezen Perrot militia (1943–44), for which he was sentenced to death in absentia at a court martial by the post-World War II French government, but eventually amnestied in 1967. After studying mathematics and physics at the University of Marburg, Germany, he arrived in Ireland in 1950. He continued his studies at University College, Galway, and, on graduation, joined the Irish Meteorological Service, becoming a naturalised Irish citizen in 1955.

An aviation meteorologist, he devoted his spare time and retirement to peaceful activism, promoting the languages, culture and autonomy of the Celtic countries. Among the honours he received for his work was the 1986 Gradam an Phiarsaigh (annual Pearse award) presented by the President of Ireland, Patrick Hillery. In the same year, at the Welsh Eisteddfod, he was elected as a Bard of the Welsh Gorsedd. He was fluent in all the six modern Celtic languages as well as English, French and German.

== Youth in Brittany ==
Heusaff was born in 1921 in Sant Ivi, near Rosporden, now in Kernev (Cornouaille, Department of Finistère). His family originated in nearby Toulgoat and his parents, Sébastien and Mari Heusaff, were native Breton speakers. Heusaff spoke only Breton at the time he was sent to school. When Heusaff was growing up it was estimated there were well over a million native speakers of this Celtic language. In 1925 the French Minister of Education, Anatole de Monzie, made clear the Government policy: "For the linguistic unity of France, Breton must be exterminated". Now banned by law was the teaching of language, literature, history, folklore and anything interpreted as "nationalist".

Arriving in a French-speaking school in these circumstances profoundly affected the boy. His community's language was openly vilified and children were punished if caught speaking it. Nevertheless, Heusaff had a good ear for languages and eventually joined the École Normale in Kemper (Quimper, Finistère) where he trained as a primary-school teacher. He continued to be acutely aware of the state's policy on Breton. Most native speakers, under these conditions, were made illiterate in their own language by the state. Yet Breton was an old literary language with the first manuscripts in it surviving from a century earlier than such manuscripts in French.

To teach himself literacy in Breton, Heusaff sent for a correspondence course from Skol-Ober founded in 1932 by Marc'harid Gourlaouen (1902–1987). As it was not politic to do so openly, he found help from a native speaker who offered the use of his address as a post-restante to receive the lessons. In an interview in 2005 with the historian Daniel Leach, his widow, Bríd Heusaff commented on the effect of his school experience on his life: "I'm fairly certain that if Breton had been taught at school when Alan went there... and if there had been some respect for it, that he would never have become involved in the Breton movement at all. Because his main interest, really, was the language".

In 1938, as a teenager, Heusaff joined the Parti National Breton (PNB) which sought to re-assert Breton independence. The crowns of Brittany and France had become unified by the marriage of Anne of Brittany to Charles VIII of France, as a condition following the defeat of the Breton armies at the Battle of Saint-Aubin-du-Cormier in 1488. Following the death of Charles VIII in 1498, Anne was forced to marry his cousin, Louis XII of France, to ensure the French crown's continued control of Brittany. Under the Traité d'Union de la Bretagne à la France, 18 September 1532, the Breton Parliament remained in being until the French National Assembly, following the French Revolution, arbitrarily abolished it in 1790. This caused a complicated situation in Brittany as many Bretons had spearheaded the Revolution as a means of overthrowing the centralist politics of the French monarchy.

Heusaff stated in 1970: "From 1938 onwards I shared the conviction that Brittany could never regain her freedom "by consent"; the French state would use all its strength to prevent that ever happening. I agreed that we should seek external support, wherever it came from, because we were too weak to attain our aims alone. Why should we not do what all free countries do when their freedom is threatened; seek alliances? By doing so we were affirming that we were already free".

Heusaff joined the PNB's uniformed but unarmed Bagadoù Stourm and then gravitated to the Kadervenn group of PNB, which believed in direct action. He became convinced that only separation from France would save both the language and the cultural identity, which he believed was dependent on its survival. Like many other Breton nationalists, he was greatly influenced by the Irish example of the 1916 Easter Rising. From the experience of their fellow Celts of Ireland during World War I, many young Bretons came to believe that if war were to break out again, then France's difficulty would be Brittany's opportunity.

== German occupation ==
In 1940, German forces overwhelmed France and Marshal of France Philippe Pétain signed an Armistice. The establishment in July of Marshal Pétain's French collaborationist government in Vichy, however, still gave it legal authority not only in the "unoccupied south" but also in northern and western France occupied by the German Wehrmacht. Many Breton militants soon realised that Germany was of little support. Rather than help the Bretons achieve their freedom, the German Occupation allowed the French collaborationist government of Vichy to remove a large section of Brittany, the department of Loire-Atlantique, in 1941. This area included Naoned (Nantes) the capital and seat of the Dukes of Brittany. The transformation of ancient Breton borders was something post-war governments were happy to inherit. With German approval, Vichy suppressed the Breton National Committee (Comité national Breton, CNB, which had been declared by nationalists in 1940) and its journal L'Heure Bretonne.

From 1941, as resistance to the occupiers grew, Breton nationalism became more divided. Moderates adopted a neutralist position, imitating that of neutral Ireland. But others, including militant activist Célestin Lainé (later known as Neven Henaff), continued to make overtures to the Nazis, hoping for their support for an independent Brittany with ties to Germany. The more supportive nationalists were of Germany, they reasoned, the more likely Berlin would be to abandon Vichy and create a Breton state. The war divide within Brittany as a whole deepened at the same time and members of the Maquis, the French Resistance, began to view all Breton nationalists as potential collaborators. They allegedly began a policy of assassination of leading Bretons in September 1943. Yann Bricler, a PNB official in Kemper and manager of the PNB magazine Stur, was shot dead in his office. Another nationalist, Yves Kerhoas, was also assassinated. On 12 December 1943, Abbé Yann Vari Perrot, the 66-year-old parish priest of Scrignac, was shot dead on the steps of his church. Perrot had been decorated for his services in World War I, but was a native speaker and leading cultural Breton nationalist, playwright and writer, involved in devising a standard orthography for the language.

Célestin Lainé had led an underground physical force movement, Gwenn-ha-Du (white and black, named after the Breton national flag) from 1930, had organised militant groups such as Lu Brezon, renamed Bezen Kadoudal, and now saw the opportunity to organise an open, uniformed and armed group – Bezen Perrot. The conditions of this unit was that it would not fight outside the borders of Brittany but remain as "a protective militia" against the French Maquis's attempts to eliminate Breton activists. But as the conflict on the ground intensified and German reprisals became more ferocious, the authorities took the Bezen Perrot and other groups in hand. By 1944, they had provided the unit with uniforms and weapons, and listed them as a unit of the SD, Sicherheitsdienst. Lainé made clear that Bezen Perrot's war was against France and was on behalf of Brittany not Germany. But although he was reported as concerned that the unit should not operate on behalf of the SD it was used by them and mounted guard on the SD interrogation centre in Rennes. In the months before and after the D-Day landings in June 1944, atrocities were reported on all sides of the conflict in Brittany.

Heusaff had been working as a primary school teach at Kerien (Querrien) and between 1941 and 1942 he began to write articles about the problems of Brittany under the pseudonym "Mab Ivi" (Son of Ivi, his home village). Others articles appeared in L'Heure Bretonne" and "Arvor. In 1942, he resigned his teaching post. Heusaff had become a kerrenour (lieutenant) in Bezen Kadoudal, which, in December 1943, became Bezen Perrot and which Heusaff saw as the nucleus of a Breton independence army.

"We were prepared to co-operate with the devil himself, if that would get rid of the French. The French were the greatest enemies of the Breton people".

A fuller account of the Bezen Perrot, including Heusaff's role, is given in Daniel Leach's Fugitive Ireland (Four Courts Press, 2009). Among controversies, Leach deals with some later accusations depicting Heusaff as a member of the LVF, showing them to be unfounded. The main focus of the book is an analysis of why Ireland gave asylum after the war to some Bretons and other foreign militants who had collaborated with Axis forces. Controversies on these issues are also elucidated in Leach's article "Irish Post-War Asylum: Nazi sympathy, Pan Celticism or raisons d'etat?" (History Ireland, May/June 2007).

In June 1944, shortly after D-Day, Heusaff was at Ploërdut, Morbihan, with members of the Bezen Perrot, when they became involved in a firefight with members of a Free French commando unit. He was seriously wounded in the shoulder and lung. Two others members of his unit were killed. Locals took Heusaff to hospital where he remained for a few weeks before evacuated to a German hospital in Montabaur, Alsace-Lorraine, where he remained until September 1944.

While in hospital, he was visited by Friedrich Hielscher, the poet, philosopher and journalist. He had connections with the Deutsche Gesellschaft für keltische studien (German Society for Celtic Studies) in Berlin and had been on a research trip to Brittany in 1943. It is suspected that he took this trip on behalf of the Abwehr, or the Ahnenerbe, which came under the SS. According to some reports, Hielscher had been involved in a resistance circle to the Nazis since the 1930s, helping Jews and others in danger from the regime. Indeed, Hielsher had contacts with members of oppressed "peuples de culture" since 1927 and some members of his group were arrested as early as 1933.

On leaving hospital in late 1944, Heusaff found Breton contacts in Strasbourg and spent time there. Other Bezen Perrot members were living there under assumed identities. Heusaff joined them and adopted the name Bernhard Heubacher, receiving papers with Hielscher's help. Until 1947, he worked in forestry, It was a frugal existence, sometimes he was forced to live on nettle soup. With Hielscher's help, he entered the university to study Physics and Maths. He remained there until 1950. Then he decided to follow other Breton militants who had sought asylum in Ireland. The Allies had swept through Brittany in August 1944, and as the Germans retreated, many of the Bezen Perrot had fled to Germany as well. On 19 September 1944, the Germans on the Crozon Peninsula had surrendered but pockets in L'Orient and in Saint-Nazaire did not surrender until May 1945.

The former Mayor of Brest, Dr Le Gorgeu, an opponent of Breton nationalism, had taken over civil administration and started a round-up of Breton nationalists. By November 1944, 2,000 Bretons were arrested including priests, women, children and even Bretons who had fought in the Resistance. Some had purportedly done little more than attend a Breton language class; others died of ill treatment in prison. Prisoners from the Rennes Central Gaol reportedly often appeared before the examining magistrate with broken limbs and bruises. By the end of 1946, 3,000 Bretons had been put in special camps; 300 of them had been sentenced to penal servitude for varying terms and 60 sentenced to death. Others had been sentenced to terms of "civil degradation", a loss of all civil rights as citizens and removal of qualifications. Of those involved in the Breton movement, 38 had been killed and 9 executed by firing squad, according to contemporary sources such as the Welsh newspaper Baner Ac Amserau Cymru.

Heusaff could not return to Brittany. Like others who went to Ireland for asylum, he was sentenced to death in absentia, not for war crimes, but for the crime of "attacks upon the integrity of the French State". He was to receive an amnesty in 1967, along with other Breton militants. Heusaff took his wife to Brittany for the first time in 1967 but were forbidden to visit Finistère, his home region. This restriction was lifted in the early 1970s. From then on until his death, Heusaff returned to Brittany on many occasions. His family had in no way supported his wartime activities and, indeed, his brother had served in the French Army and become a prisoner of war.

== Meteorology ==
On 20 May 1950, Heusaff left Marburg under the alias "Bernard Heubacher", and travelled through Belgium to England and Wales, and then to Ireland, where he enrolled in University College, Galway, to finish his degree. To finance himself, he taught German classes. One of his students was Bríd Ní Dhochartaigh from the Fanaid Gaeltacht in County Donegal. In 1953, the couple married and had six children. He had learned to speak Irish fluently. The couple's two sons and four daughters were raised as an Irish speaking family.

Heusaff joined the Irish Meteorological Service in 1952, still as Bernard Heubacher, and worked at Dublin Airport for eighteen months before being transferred to Shannon Airport. He became a naturalised citizen under his own name in 1955. In 1958, the Heusaff family moved back to Dublin. He worked at Dublin Airport for the rest of his career. Interested in ecological matters, he also spent time researching the history of weather patterns as recorded in Irish annals and documents from earliest times. After his death, Brendan McWilliams, director of the service, and a well-known Irish Times columnist, wrote:

Alan spent his entire working life in aviation meteorology... In addition to his operational duties, he made brave efforts over a period of 15 years to bring the ancient climate of our island into focus, delving into historical documents to identify and record whatever mention might be made of the weather. He found many such references, and unearthed nearly 1,000 useful records extending over 1,400 years from AD 490 to 1829 which, collectively, have added significantly to knowledge of the Irish climate in the centuries gone by.

McWilliams adds: "He was a meticulous and conscientious meteorologist, and I personally remember him as always cheerful, courteous and eager to help to solve whatever operational problems might arise."

== The Celtic League ==
The formation of The Celtic league is regarded as Heusaff's major achievement. The modern philosophy of Pan-Celticism, of co-operation between the six modern Celtic nations (the Irish, Manx, Scots, Welsh, Cornish and Bretons) had first been given published form by Charles de Gaulle (1837–1880), a Breton language poet. The League was born in a meeting at the Eisteddfod at Rhos, near Llangollen, in North Wales in 1961. The principal aims were then: to foster co-operation between the national movements in the Celtic countries, particularly in efforts to obtain international recognition and to share the experiences of their struggles and exchange constructive ideas.

Heusaff was elected general secretary, a position he held until 1984–85. An existing magazine Celtic Voice was offered as a means of propagating the League. By the second annual meeting on 30 September 1962, the League had branches in all six Celtic countries, as well as in London. The League then launched its own quarterly journal Celtic News, initially edited by Welsh historian Dr. Ceinwen Thomas of University College, Cardiff. From 1963 until 1971, an annual volume was also published constituting up to 180 pages. Celtic News continued under various editors until a more professionally produced journal, Carn, was launched in the Spring of 1973, with Frank Thomson, a Scottish writer and journalist, as its first editor. Still published quarterly, Carn carries articles in all six Celtic languages, as well as in English and French.

Gwynfor Evans MP continued as president until 1972, while Vice-Presidents consisted of leaders of the main political national parties, such as Dr Yann Fouéré of the Mouvement Pour l'Organisation de la Bretagne; Dr Robert McIntyre of the Scottish National Party (and its first Member of Parliament) and Robert Dunstone, the president of the Cornish movement, Mebyon Kernow. However, by 1972, it was decided that conflicts of interest were arising and that the League should elect its own independent president and officials. Such a conflict had arisen in 1969 at the League's annual meeting it Dublin when Gwynfor Evans used his League office to speak of Plaid Cymru policies which conflicted with attitudes in other Celtic countries. Pádraig Ó Conchúir became the first "chairman" replacing Gwynfor Evans. Later the officer of "chairman" was replaced by "convenor".

Under Heusaff, the League gave evidence to the European Commission of Human Rights in 1963 concerning the persecution of the Breton language. This aroused media attention. The League sent an official delegation to the 14th Congress of the Federal Union of European Nationalities (representing ethnic minorities), and in November 1965, the League delivered a 62-page memorandum, arguing the case for self-government for the Celtic countries to the United Nations Organization and distributed it in 1966 to members of the Council of Europe.

The League also took a leading part in other campaigns, for example, monitoring submarine activity in the Irish Sea where they refused to surface, snaring fishing nets and causing the loss of boats and lives. Ensuing publicity over the years to these incidents brought the League into the mainstream. Another success was the League's spearheading of a campaign to transfer the ownership of the bird island sanctuary, the Calf of Man, from the English National Trust to the Manx National Trust. The League soon made the idea of Pan-Celticism a public issue and forced the academic Celtic Congress into actions such as adopting a "Charter of Cultural Rights". In 1979, a Celtic Film and Television Festival was inaugurated and in 1981 UNESCO launched their permanent "Project for the Study and Promotion of Celtic Cultures". Conferences, book fairs, television programmes, and an International Federation of Celtic Wrestling was formed.

The burgeoning of the Celtic idea came from Heusaff's original vision. Although he resigned office around 1985, he continued to work for the League. As a tribute to his work, The Celtic League published that year a festschrift in his honour For A Celtic Future, of essays by many leading Celticists, and edited by Cathal Ó Luain, who had become convenor of the League.

Upon his retirement from the Meteorological Service in 1986, Alan and Bríd moved to Seanadh Gharráin, near Spidéal, County Galway, where he concentrated on his lexicographical work, kept up a voluminous correspondence with his Celtic contacts, and remained involved in the League. In July 1990, Heusaff wrote of the future of the League:

The Celtic League has a role to play in stimulating Inter Celtic contacts, Inter Celtic solidarity, which could express itself in contributing to pressure on politicians and international/European institutions to steer developments in Europe towards full recognition of the rights of our nations including languages. Other Inter Celtic organizations exist (i.e. Celtic Congress), also Inter Celtic events (Film and Television Festival. Celtic Congress of Writers etc.) – but we are the only association so far working on a continuous or permanent basis. We need to think about what contribution the Celtic peoples and their cultures can make to the development of European unity, to formulate proposals and suggestions, disseminating them, instead of adopting an aloof sort of attitude. We lack people to do this work. Many European peoples have something like an attachment to Celtic matters. I believe we should appeal to them to help to get recognition and the freedom we need to realize our national aims. Our problem is to bring young people to join in the work. The cosmopolitanization of culture, which now rules supreme, the control of the media by the agents of uniformity, are great obstacles to our progress.

Before he died, it was arranged that all Heusaff's papers connected with the Celtic League should be deposited in the National Library of Wales at Aberystwyth, and are classified as 681, Celtic League Archive.

== Irish language activist ==
Heusaff and his wife were members of Conradh na Gaeilge and involved in Na Teaghlaigh Ghaelacha, an organisation for Irish speaking families. Bríd became a member of the Executive of Conradh na Gaeilge and was very active in Irish language activities. Heusaff took part in Irish language campaigns such as Cearta Sibhialta na Gaeltachta and was the first person to refuse, on principle, to pay a television licence because of Raidió Teilifís Éireann's (RTÉ) neglect of Irish language programmes. This campaign ultimately resulted in the establishment of Teilifís na Gaeilge (later TG4) in 1996.

In 1986 Irish President, Patrick Hillery, presented him with the Gradam an Phiarsaigh annual award for promoting the ideals of Patrick Pearse. Later that year, he was elected as a Bard of the Welsh Gorsedd, as "Gwenerzh" (Muse) as having made a distinguished contribution to the Welsh nation, language and culture.

== Breton language scholar ==
While working for the language and culture of his adopted country, Heusaff never ceased to promote the Breton language and the struggle of his native country for independence. He taught Breton language classes in his spare time in Dublin and became a prolific journalist in Breton, editing Argoad, a Breton language news bulletin, with an English edition Breton News, which he founded in 1959. He also contributed to Breton language magazines in Brittany such as Hor Yezh, Galva, Breman, Gwalarn, Arvor, Ar Bed Keltiek, An Amzer and Al Liamm. The first all-Breton dictionary, Geriadur Brezhoneg, published by An Here in 1995, cited Heusaff as a major contributor. This provoked some protest given renewed controversies in Brittany over his and others' wartime background. Heusaff also published a dictionary of his own dialect of Sant Ivi as Geriaoueg Sant Ivi, initially in the magazine Hor Yezh between 1962 and 1973. A revised version of the work was issued in book form in 1996.

== Death ==
Heusaff died on 3 November 1999, at his home near An Spidéal in Connemara, Galway. He married Bríd Ní Dhochartaigh in 1953 (died 2 February 2008); the couple had six children, four girls and two boys.

== See also ==
- Celtic League (political organisation)
