= Language nest =

Immersion-based approach to language revitalization in early-childhood education

A language nest is an immersion-based approach to language revitalization in early-childhood education. Language nests originated in New Zealand in the 1980s, as a part of the Māori-language revival in the country. The term "language nest" is a calque of the Māori phrase kōhanga reo. In a language nest, older speakers of the language take part in the education of children through intergenerational language transference. With that, these older fluent speakers act as mentors and help children use the target language in many different settings. The language nest is a program that places focus on local Indigenous cultural practices and perspectives, and with that incorporates traditional activities, cultural products, and Indigenous language discourse. Additionally, the quality of these early childhood immersion programs helps in aiding the development of linguistic and cultural competence for participants.

== Europe ==
=== Estonia ===
There is only one language nest for Võro working three days a week in Haanja and several initiatives, so called "language nest days" (keelepesäpäiv) that are working one day in week in 18 different kindergartens of Võro area. Võro language nest initiatives are organised by Võro Institute.

=== Finland ===
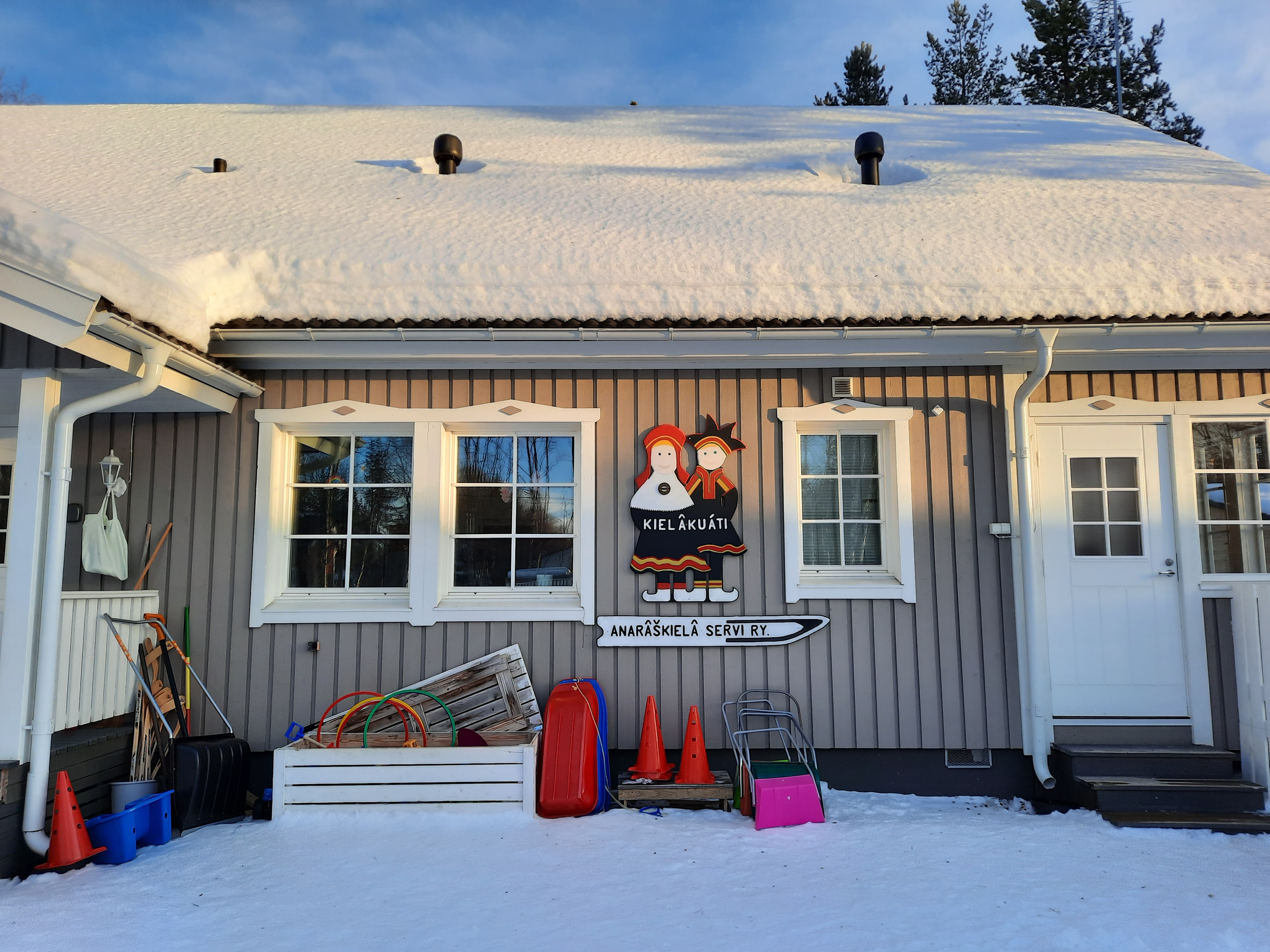
The Inari Saami language nest in Ivalo, Finland

There are language nests for Inari Sámi, Skolt Sami, and the Karelian languages in Finland.

=== Russia ===
There is a language nest in Vieljärvi, Karjalan Tazavaldu (Vedlozero, the Republic of Karelia): Karjalan Kielen Kodi. Language nest is kielipezä in Karelian.

Language nests have been proposed as part of the revitalization of Nivkh on Sakhalin, but as of 2018 had not been implemented due to the unwillingness of local school administrators and shortages of staff and funding.

=== Isle of Man ===
Language nests have been used on the Isle of Man, where there are Manx language playgroups and nurseries run by Mooinjer Veggey, a charity.

== North America ==
=== Canada ===
A study in 2004 reported on two language nests in British Columbia: a Cseyseten ('language nest') at Adam's Lake in the Secwepemc language, and a Clao7alcw ('raven’s nest') at Lil’wat Nation in the Lil’wat language written about by Onowa McIvor for her master's thesis.

The First Peoples' Cultural Council in Canada provides grants to First Nations communities in British Columbia as part of the Pre-School Language Nest Program.

In the Northwest Territories, there are language nests for each of the official Aboriginal languages, with more than 20 language nests in total.

=== United States ===
In Hawaii, the Hawaiian-language equivalent, the Pūnana Leo, has been running for 40 years and has also been successful in producing first-language speakers of Hawaiian.

In Minnesota, the Enweyang Ojibwe Language Nest started in 2009. In collaboration with UMD's College of Education and Human Services Professionals and Eni-gikendaasoyang, the Center for Indigenous Knowledge and Language Revitalization, the program targets 4- to 5-year-olds in a half day session in the Duluth area. The main goal of this program was to teach Ojibwe language and immerse preschool children, families, and university students in the language and culture. The needs of the program were identified by the Indigenous community and participating post-secondary students. This program had a high success rate based on feedback from the participating families and showcased a lot of benefits of this type of learning. Additionally, the program structure used surveys and allowed for researchers to track the learning experience. There were 12 main takeaways that came from this program that can be applied to other program. The first three were focusing on the target language, meaning not using English in the program, starting from the beginning, and starting today, as starting from a young age has its benefits. The next few including respecting different dialects, supporting families and community members, and focusing on a culture-centred approach. Building a community of support, strong leadership, and kindness within the program were also highlighted. The last few include quality language and promoting active speech communities, allowing for quality teaching, and valuing the small accomplishments made along the way.

Additionally, the Dakhódiapi Wahóȟpi ('Dakota Language Nest') opened in 2022 at the University of Minnesota Twin Cities. It is housed in the Child Development Laboratory School in Minneapolis.

The tribal schools in Cusick, near Kalispell in Montana offer classes in the Kalispel–Spokane–Flathead language, including an immersion language program for elementary school children.

In North Dakota, Lakȟól’yapi Wahóȟpi, the Lakota Language Immersion Nest, opened on September 12, 2012. Full day schooling aimed at 3-year-olds, with parents also receiving training to encourage at home efforts, is key to this program.

In South Dakota on the Pine Ridge Reservation, the Lakota Language & Education Initiative at Thunder Valley Community Development Corporation services children from ages 0-9 years old through the language nest model. Utilizing the language nest model and the Montessori approach, Thunder Valley CDC's effort is designed to reclaim and revitalize the Lakota language and Lifeways.

Sixteen language nests have existed in Alaska at various points, though all but X̱ántsii Náay Haida Immersion Preschool have since ceased operation.

== Oceania ==
=== Australia ===
In August 2009, the Australian government pledged to pilot language nests as part of its National Indigenous Languages Policy. The first of five Aboriginal language and culture nests in New South Wales launched in 2013, although these are government service delivery centres and not immersion pre-schools. The Miriwoong Language Nest has been running in Kununurra since early 2014 with over 300 children attending per week.

=== New Zealand ===
The first kōhanga reo was founded in Wainuiomata in 1982, and was followed by wholly immersive primary schools and secondary schools—Kura Kaupapa Māori—where Māori is the primary language of instruction.

According to Al Jazeera, the percentage of Māori people speaking the language has increased by a few percentage points from the early 1980s to 2014. Linguist Christopher Moseley says that this statistic is "quite encouraging" because "compared to how quickly a language can disappear, in just one generation in extreme cases, the figures are good."

== See also ==
- Movyans Skolyow Meythrin
  - Skol Veythrin Karenza
- Bunscoill Ghaelgagh
- Breath of Life (language restoration workshops)
