= Plantation of Ulster =

17th-century colonisation of northern Ireland

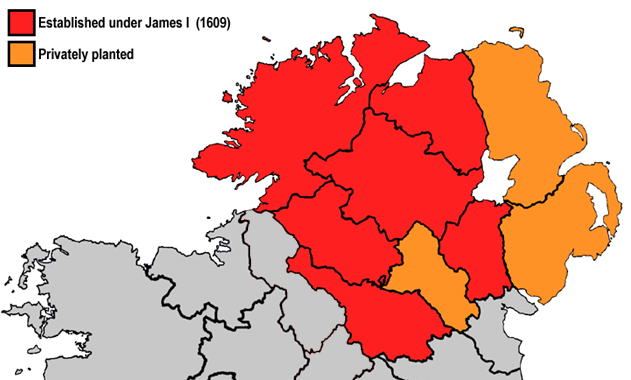
The counties of Ulster (modern boundaries) that were colonised during the plantations. This map is a simplified one, as the amount of land actually colonised did not cover the entire shaded area.

The Plantation of Ulster (Irish: Plandáil Uladh; Ulster Scots: Plantin o Ulstèr) was the organised colonisation ("plantation") of the Irish province of Ulster by people from England and Scotland in the early 17th century, during the reign of King James I. Most of it was on confiscated Irish land. It was the biggest of the plantations of Ireland.

Small privately funded plantations by wealthy landowners began in 1606, while the official plantation began in 1609. Most of the land had been confiscated from the native Gaelic chiefs, several of whom had fled Ireland for mainland Europe in 1607 following the Nine Years' War against English rule. The official plantation comprised an estimated half a million acres (2,000 km^{2}) of arable land in counties Armagh, Cavan, Fermanagh, Tyrone, Donegal, and Londonderry. Land in counties Antrim, Down, and Monaghan was privately colonised with the king's support.

Among those involved in planning and overseeing the plantation were King James, the Lord Deputy of Ireland, Arthur Chichester, and the Attorney-General for Ireland, John Davies. They saw the plantation as a means of controlling, anglicising, and "civilising" Ulster. The province was almost wholly Gaelic, Catholic, rural, and had been the region most resistant to English control. The colonists (or "British tenants") were required to be English-speaking Protestants; most came from the Scottish Lowlands and Northern England. Although some "loyal" natives were granted land, and a small number of the planters were Catholics, the native Irish reaction to the plantation was generally hostile, and native writers lamented what they saw as the decline of Gaelic society and the influx of foreigners.

The plantation led to the founding of many of Ulster's towns and created a separate and lasting Ulster Protestant community in the province with ties to Britain. It also resulted in many of the native Irish nobility losing their land and led to centuries of ethnic and sectarian animosity, which at times spilled into conflict, notably in the Irish Rebellion of 1641 and, more recently, the Troubles.

== Ulster before plantation ==
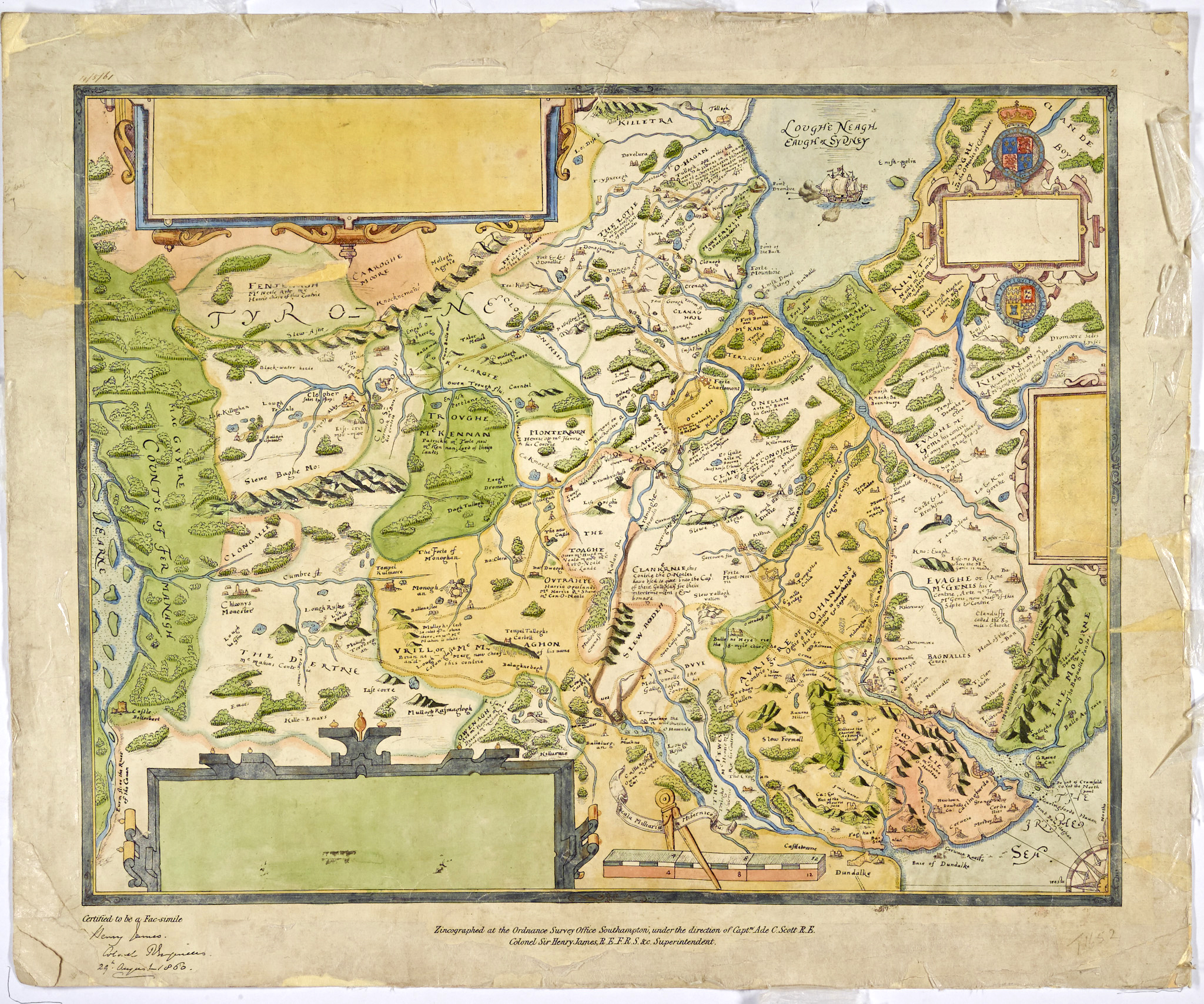
A map of southern Ulster c.1609, just before the Plantation

Before the plantation, Ulster had been the most Gaelic province of Ireland, as it was the least anglicised and the most independent of English control. The region was almost wholly rural and had few towns or villages. Throughout the 16th century, Ulster was viewed by the English as being "underpopulated" and undeveloped. The economy of Gaelic Ulster was overwhelmingly based on agriculture, especially cattle-raising. Many of the Gaelic Irish practised "creaghting" or "booleying", a kind of transhumance whereby some of them moved with their cattle to upland pastures during the summer months and lived in temporary dwellings during that time. This often led outsiders to mistakenly believe the Gaelic Irish were nomadic. However, by the end of the Sixteenth century, the Irish economy heavily relied on arable agriculture. The Earl of Tyrone used crop yields to finance his war against the English. Tyrone developed a system of Demesne agriculture, which increased the profitability of agriculture within his territories. When Lord Mountjoy invaded Ulster in 1601, he identified the harvest as the primary means by which Tyrone continued the war.

The population of Ulster before the Plantation has been estimated to be around 180,000-200,000. This was after the destruction caused by the devastating famine and warfare at the end of the Nine Years War. The war fought between the native Irish Confederacy and the English Crown undoubtedly contributed to depopulation, with 60,000 reported dead by famine and attacks on the civilian population.

The Tudor conquest of Ireland began in the 1540s, during the reign of Henry VIII (1509–1547), and concluded in the reign of Elizabeth I (1558–1603) sixty years later, breaking the power of the semi-independent Irish chieftains. As part of the conquest, plantations (colonial settlements) were established in Queen's County and King's County (Laois and Offaly) in the 1550s as well as Munster in the 1580s, and in 1568 Warham St Leger and Richard Grenville established Joint stock/Cooperate colonies in Cork, although these were not very successful.

In the 1570s, Elizabeth I authorised a privately funded plantation of eastern Ulster, led by Thomas Smith and Walter Devereux, 1st Earl of Essex. This was a failure and sparked violent conflict with the local Irish lord, in which Lord Deputy Essex killed many of the lord of Clandeboy's kin.

In the Nine Years' War of 1594–1603, an alliance of northern Gaelic chieftains—led by Hugh O'Neill of Tyrone, Hugh Roe O'Donnell of Tyrconnell, and Hugh Maguire of Fermanagh—resisted the imposition of English government in Ulster and sought to affirm their own control. Following an extremely costly series of campaigns by the English, the war ended in 1603 with the Treaty of Mellifont. The terms of surrender granted to what remained of O'Neill's forces were considered generous at the time.

After the Treaty of Mellifont, the northern chieftains attempted to consolidate their positions, whilst some within the English administration attempted to undermine them. In 1607, O'Neill and his primary allies left Ireland to seek Spanish help for a new rebellion to restore their privileges, in what became known as the Flight of the Earls. King James issued a proclamation declaring their action to be treason, paving the way for the forfeiture of their lands and titles.

== Aims ==
The Plantation of Ulster was presented to James I as a joint "British" (English and Scottish) venture to 'pacify' and 'civilise' Ulster, with the number of settlers split evenly between each country. James saw the Gaels as barbarous and rebellious, and believed Gaelic culture should be wiped out. Plantation was seen as a means of anglicising Ulster and implementing the Protestant Reformation there.

For centuries, Scottish Gaelic mercenaries called gallowglass (gallóglaigh) had been migrating to Ulster to serve under the Irish chiefs. James wanted to sever these ties, seeing them as a threat to England.

Furthermore, James had been King of Scotland before he became King of England and wanted to reward his Scottish subjects with land in Ulster to assure them they were not being neglected now that he had moved his court to London. Long-standing contacts between Ulster and the west of Scotland meant that Scottish participation was a practical necessity.

King James therefore had the following objectives in implementing the plantation:

- To bring the rebellious province of Ulster under full control
- To anglicise the Ulster Irish and convert them to Protestantism
- To sever ties between the Gaelic clans of Ulster and those of the Scottish Highlands, preventing the flow of mercenaries
- To ensure that the Scottish subjects of James I would not be overlooked by the London court and would be rewarded with land for their loyalty
- To relocate the Border reiver families to Ireland to pacify the Anglo-Scottish border region, which had often been in a state of conflict, and to provide fighting men who could suppress the native Irish.

== Planning the plantation ==
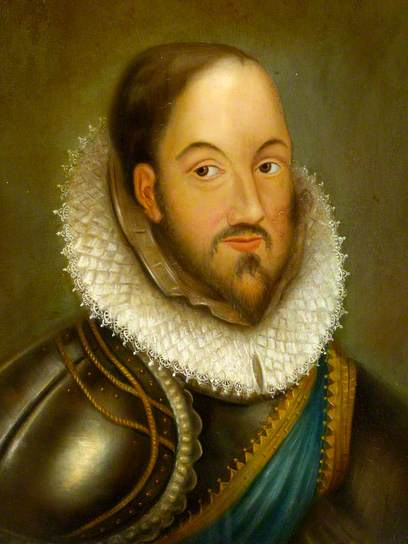
Arthur Chichester, Lord Deputy of Ireland, one of the main planners of the Plantation

A colonisation of Ulster had been proposed since the end of the Nine Years' War. The original proposals were smaller, involving planting settlers around key military posts and on church land, and would have included large land grants to native Irish lords who sided with the English during the war, such as Niall Garve O'Donnell. However, in 1608 Sir Cahir O'Doherty of Inishowen launched a rebellion, capturing and burning the town of Derry. The brief rebellion was ended by Sir Richard Wingfield at the Battle of Kilmacrennan. The rebellion prompted Arthur Chichester, the Lord Deputy of Ireland, to plan a much bigger plantation and to expropriate the legal titles of all native landowners in the province. John Davies, the Attorney-General for Ireland, used the law as a tool of conquest and colonisation. Before the Flight of the Earls, the English administration had sought to minimise the personal estates of the chieftains, but now they treated the chieftains as sole owners of their whole territories, so that all the land could be confiscated. Most of this land was deemed to be forfeited (or escheated) to the Crown because the chieftains were declared to be attainted. English judges had also declared that titles to land held under gavelkind, the native Irish custom of inheriting land, had no standing under English law. Davies used this as a means to confiscate land, when other means failed.

Six counties were involved in the official plantation – Donegal, Londonderry, Tyrone, Fermanagh, Cavan and Armagh. In the two officially unplanted counties of Antrim and Down, substantial Presbyterian Scots settlement had been underway since 1606.

The plan for the plantation was determined by two factors. One was the wish to make sure the settlement could not be destroyed by rebellion as the first Munster Plantation had been in the Nine Years' War. This meant that, rather than settling the planters in isolated pockets of land confiscated from the Irish, all of the land would be confiscated and then redistributed to create concentrations of British settlers around new towns and garrisons.

What was more, the new landowners were explicitly banned from taking Irish tenants and had to import workers from England and Scotland. The remaining Irish landowners were to be granted one quarter of the land in Ulster. The peasant Irish population was intended to be relocated to live near garrisons and Protestant churches. Moreover, the planters were barred from selling their lands to any Irishman and were required to build defences against any possible rebellion or invasion. The settlement was to be completed within three years. In this way, it was hoped that a defensible new community composed entirely of loyal British subjects would be created.

The second major influence on the Plantation was the negotiation among various interest groups on the British side. The principal landowners were to be "Undertakers", wealthy men from England and Scotland who undertook to import tenants from their own estates. They were granted around 3000 acres (12 km^{2}) each, on condition that they settle a minimum of 48 adult males (including at least 20 families), who had to be English-speaking and Protestant. Veterans of the Nine Years' War (known as "Servitors") led by Arthur Chichester successfully lobbied to be rewarded with land grants of their own.

Since these former officers did not have enough private capital to fund the colonisation, their involvement was subsidised by the twelve great guilds. Livery companies from the City of London were coerced into investing in the project, as were City of London guilds which were granted land on the west bank of the River Foyle, to build their own city on the site of Derry (renamed Londonderry after them) as well as lands in County Coleraine. They were known jointly as The Honourable The Irish Society. The final major recipient of lands was the Protestant Church of Ireland, which was granted all the churches and lands previously owned by the Roman Catholic Church. The British government intended that clerics from England and the Pale would convert the native population to Anglicanism.

== Implementing the plantation ==
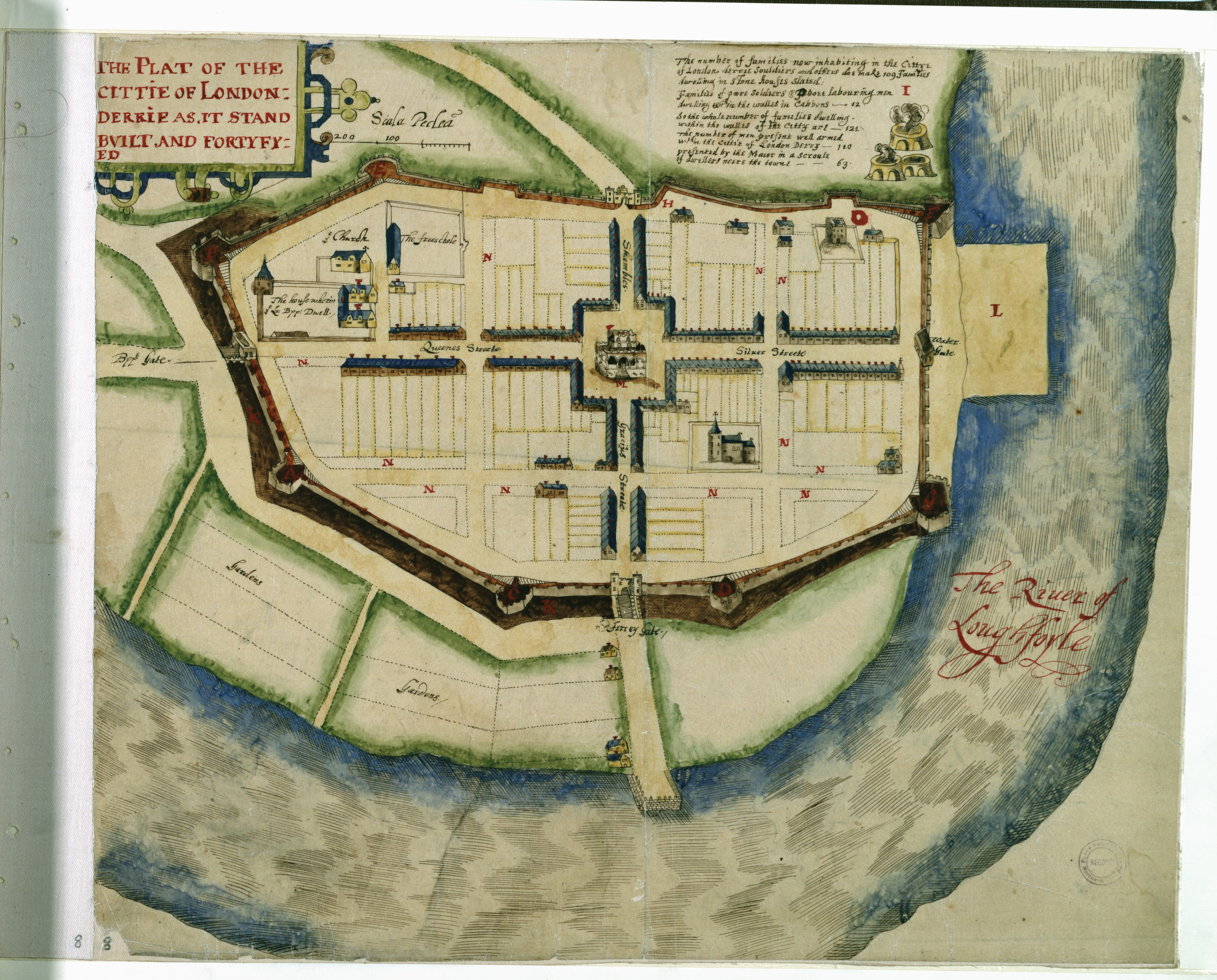
A plan of the new city of Londonderry, c.1622

Since 1606, there had been substantial lowland Scots settlement on disinhabited land in north Down, led by Hugh Montgomery and James Hamilton. In 1607, Sir Randall MacDonnell settled 300 Presbyterian Scots families on his land in Antrim.

From 1609 onwards, British Protestant colonists arrived in Ulster through direct importation by Undertakers to their estates and also by a spread to unpopulated areas, through ports such as Derry and Carrickfergus. In addition, there was much internal movement of settlers who did not like the original land allotted to them. Some planters settled on uninhabited and unexploited land, often building up their farms and homes on overgrown terrain that has been variously described as "wilderness" and "virgin" ground. In 1612, William Cole received a grant of land to establish a settler town at Enniskillen.

Most of the early settlers were families from the Scottish Lowlands and Northern England along the Anglo-Scottish border, with differing Protestant affiliations.

By 1622, a survey found that there were 6,402 British adult males on Plantation lands, of whom 3,100 were English and 3,700 Scottish – indicating a total adult planter population of around 12,000. However, another 4,000 Scottish adult males had settled in unplanted Antrim and Down, giving a total settler population of about 19,000.

By the 1630s, there were 20,000 adult male British settlers in Ulster, which meant that the total settler population could have been as high as 80,000. They formed local majorities of the population in the Finn and Foyle valleys (around modern County Londonderry and east Donegal), in north Armagh and in east Tyrone. Moreover, the unofficial settlements in Antrim and Down were thriving. The settler population grew rapidly, as just under half of the planters were women.

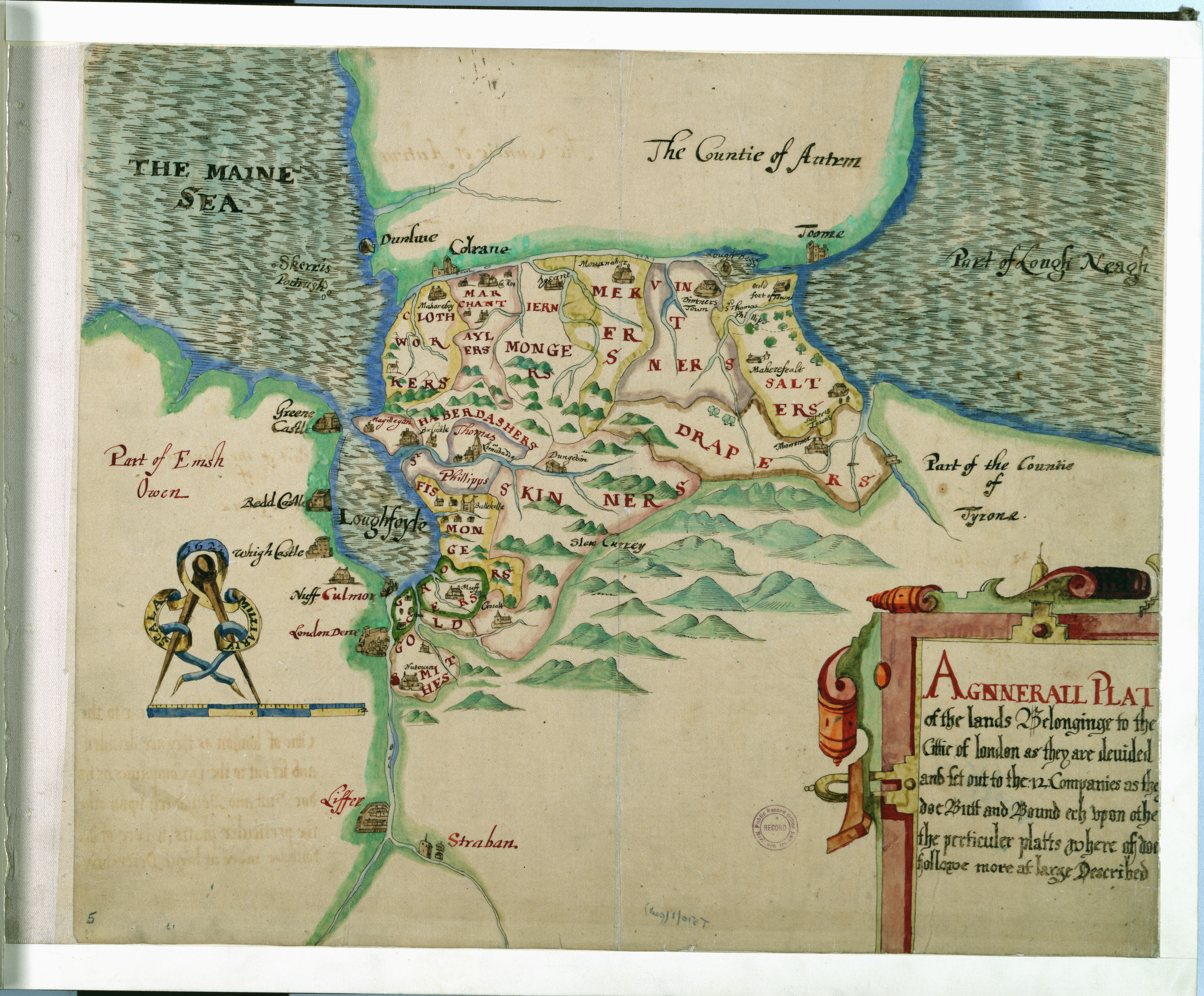
Copy of a 1622 map of County Londonderry, showing the lands belonging to the London Guilds

There had been very few towns in Ulster before the Plantation. Most modern towns in the province can date their origins back to this period. Plantation towns generally have a single broad main street ending in a square in a design often known as a "diamond", which can be seen in communities like The Diamond, Donegal.

The plantation was a mixed success from the point of view of the settlers. About the time the Plantation of Ulster was planned, the Virginia Plantation at Jamestown in 1607 started. The London guilds planning to fund the Plantation of Ulster switched and backed the London Virginia Company instead. Many British Protestant settlers went to Virginia or New England in America rather than to Ulster.

Although the Plantation had decreed that the Irish population be displaced, this did not generally happen in practice. Firstly, some 300 native landowners who had taken the English side in the Nine Years' War were rewarded with land grants. Secondly, the majority of the Gaelic Irish remained in their native areas, but were now only allowed worse land than before the plantation. They usually lived close to and even in the same townlands as the settlers and the land they had farmed previously. The main reason for this was that Undertakers could not import enough English or Scottish tenants to fill their agricultural workforce and had to fall back on Irish tenants. However, in a few heavily populated lowland areas (such as parts of north Armagh) it is likely that some population displacement occurred.

The attempted conversion of the Irish to Protestantism was generally a failure. One problem was language differences. The Protestant clerics imported were usually all monoglot English speakers, whereas the native population was usually monoglot Irish speakers. However, ministers chosen to serve in the plantation were required to take a course in the Irish language before ordination, and nearly 10% of those who took up their preferments spoke it fluently. Nevertheless, conversion was rare, despite the fact that, after 1621, Gaelic Irish natives could be officially classed as British if they converted to Protestantism. Of those Catholics who did convert to Protestantism, many made their choice for social and political reasons.

The Plantation was threatened by the attacks of bandits, known as "wood-kern", who were often Irish soldiers or dispossessed landowners. In 1609, Chichester had 1,300 former Gaelic soldiers deported from Ulster to serve in the Swedish Army. As a result, military garrisons were established across Ulster and many of the Plantation towns, notably Derry, were fortified. The settlers were also required to maintain arms and attend an annual military 'muster'.

=== Irish reaction ===
The reaction of the native Irish to the plantation was generally hostile. Chichester wrote in 1610 that the native Irish in Ulster were "generally discontented, and repine greatly at their fortunes, and the small quantity of land left to them". That same year, English army officer Toby Caulfield wrote that "there is not a more discontented people in Christendom" than the Ulster Irish. Irish Gaelic writers bewailed the plantation. In an entry for the year 1608, the Annals of the Four Masters states that the land was "taken from the Irish" and given "to foreign tribes", and that Irish chiefs were "banished into other countries where most of them died". Likewise, an early 17th-century poem by the Irish bard Lochlann Óg Ó Dálaigh laments the plantation, the displacement of the native Irish, and the decline of Gaelic culture. It asks "Where have the Gaels gone?", adding "We have in their stead an arrogant, impure crowd, of foreigners' blood".

Historian Thomas Bartlett suggests that Irish hostility to the plantation may have been muted in the early years, as there were much fewer settlers arriving than expected. Bartlett writes that a hatred for the planters grew with the influx of settlers from the 1620s, and the increasing marginalisation of the Irish. Historian Gerard Farrell writes that the plantation stoked a "smoldering resentment" in the Irish, among whom "a widespread perception persisted that they and the generation before them had been unfairly dispossessed of their lands by force and legal chicanery". Petty violence and sabotage against the planters was rife, and many Irish came to identify with the woodkern who attacked settlements and ambushed settlers. Farrell suggests it took many years for an Irish uprising to happen because there was depopulation, because many native leaders had been removed, and those who remained only belatedly realised the threat of the plantation.

== Wars of the Three Kingdoms ==
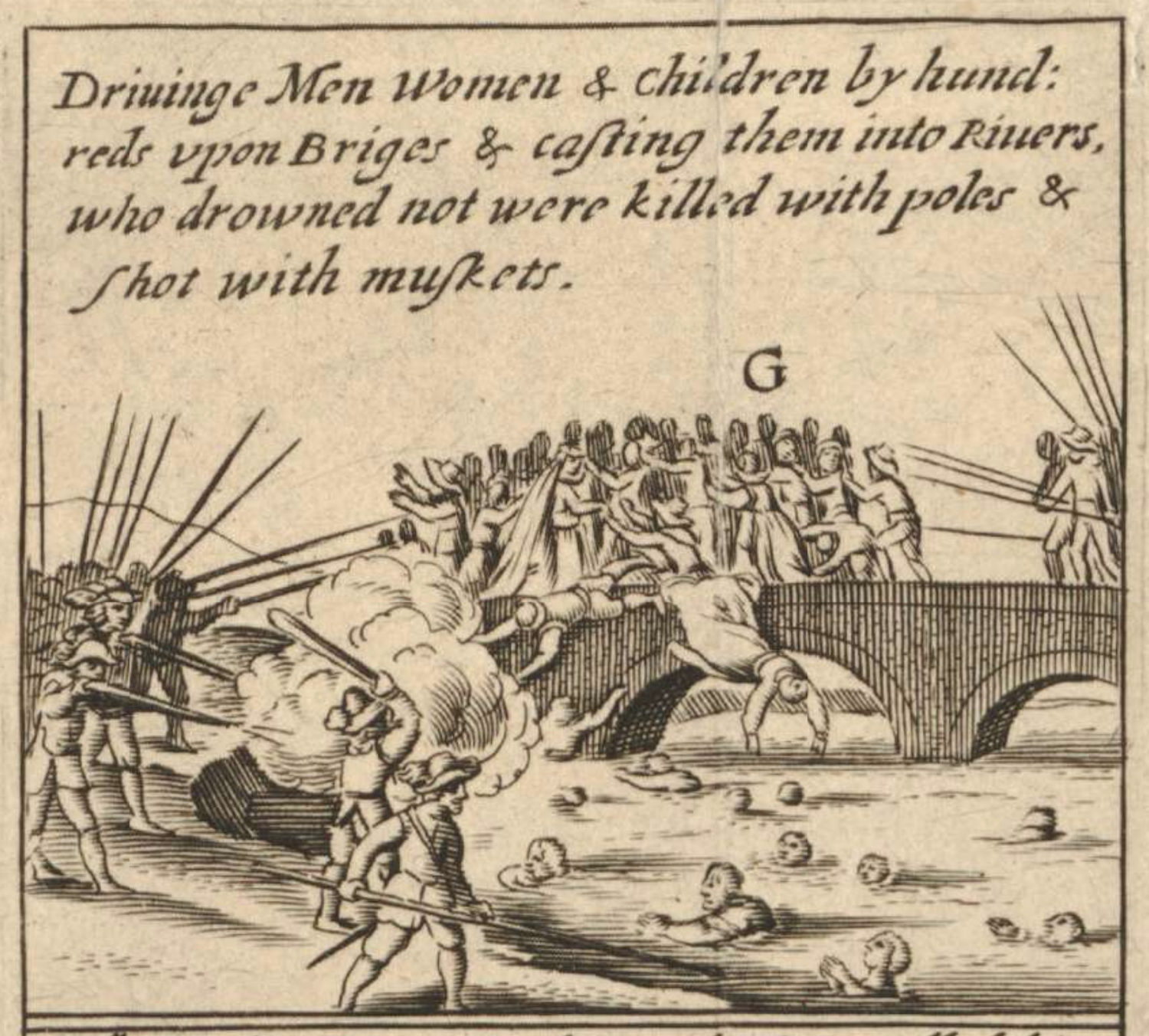
A 1642 print of the Portadown massacre

By the 1630s it is suggested that the plantation was settling down with "tacit religious tolerance", and in every county Old Irish were serving as royal officials and members of the Irish Parliament. However, in the 1640s, the Ulster Plantation was thrown into turmoil by civil wars that raged in Ireland, England and Scotland. The wars saw Irish rebellion against the planters, twelve years of bloody war, and ultimately the re-conquest of the province by the English parliamentary New Model Army that confirmed English and Protestant dominance in the province.

After 1630, Scottish migration to Ireland waned for a decade. In the 1630s, Presbyterians in Scotland staged a rebellion against Charles I for trying to impose Anglicanism. The same was attempted in Ireland, where most Scots colonists were Presbyterian. A large number of them returned to Scotland as a result. Charles I subsequently raised an army largely composed of Irish Catholics, and sent them to Ulster in preparation to invade Scotland. The English and Scottish parliaments then threatened to attack this army. In the midst of this, Gaelic Irish landowners in Ulster, led by Felim O'Neill and Rory O'More, planned a rebellion to take over the administration in Ireland.

On 23 October 1641, the Ulster Catholics staged a rebellion. The mobilised natives turned on the British colonists, massacring about 4,000 and expelling about 8,000 more. Marianne Elliott believes that "1641 destroyed the Ulster Plantation as a mixed settlement". The initial leader of the rebellion, Felim O'Neill, had actually been a beneficiary of the Plantation land grants. Most of his supporters' families had been dispossessed and were likely motivated by the desire to recover their ancestral lands. Many colonists who survived rushed to the seaports and went back to Great Britain.

The massacres made a lasting impression on the psyche of the Ulster Protestant population. A. T. Q. Stewart states that "The fear which it inspired survives in the Protestant subconscious as the memory of the Penal Laws or the Famine persists in the Catholic." He also believed that "Here, if anywhere, the mentality of siege was born, as the warning bonfires blazed from hilltop to hilltop, and the beating drums summoned men to the defence of castles and walled towns crowded with refugees."

In the summer of 1642, the Scottish Parliament sent some 10,000 soldiers to quell the Irish rebellion. In revenge for the massacres of Scottish colonists, the army committed many atrocities against the Catholic population. Based in Carrickfergus, the Scottish army fought against the rebels until 1650, although much of the army was destroyed by the Irish forces at the Battle of Benburb in 1646. In the northwest of Ulster, the colonists around Derry and east Donegal organised the Laggan Army in self-defence. The British forces fought an inconclusive war with the Ulster Irish led by Owen Roe O'Neill. All sides committed atrocities against civilians in this war, exacerbating the population displacement begun by the Plantation.

In addition to fighting the Ulster Irish, the British settlers fought each other in 1648–49 over the issues of the English Civil War. The Scottish Presbyterian army sided with the King and the Laggan Army sided with the English Parliament. In 1649–50, the New Model Army, along with some of the British colonists under Charles Coote, defeated both the Scottish forces and the Ulster Irish.

As a result, the English Parliamentarians (or Cromwellians) were generally hostile to Scottish Presbyterians after they re-conquered Ireland from the Catholic Confederates in 1649–53. The main beneficiaries of the postwar Cromwellian settlement were English Protestants like Sir Charles Coote, who had taken the Parliament's side over the King or the Scottish Presbyterians. The Wars eliminated the last major Catholic landowners in Ulster.

== Continued migration from Scotland and England to Ulster ==
Most Scottish planters came from southwest Scotland, but many also came from the unstable regions along the border with England. The plan was that moving Borderers (see Border Reivers) to Ireland (particularly to County Fermanagh) would both solve the Border problem and tie down Ulster. This was of particular concern to James VI of Scotland when he became King of England, since he knew Scottish instability could jeopardise his chances of ruling both kingdoms effectively.

Another wave of Scottish immigration to Ulster took place in the 1690s, when tens of thousands of Scots fled a famine (1696–1698) in the border region of Scotland. It was at this point that Scottish Presbyterians became the majority community in the province. Whereas in the 1660s, they made up some 20% of Ulster's population (though 60% of its British population), by 1720 they were an absolute majority in Ulster, with up to 50,000 having arrived during the period 1690–1710. There was continuing English migration throughout this period, particularly the 1650s and 1680s, notably amongst these settlers were the Quakers from Northern England, who contributed greatly to the cultivation of flax and linen. In total, during the half-century between 1650 and 1700, 100,000 British settlers migrated to Ulster, with around half being English.

Despite the fact that Scottish Presbyterians strongly supported the Williamites in the Williamite war in Ireland in the 1690s, they were excluded from power in the postwar settlement by the Anglican Protestant Ascendancy. During the 18th century, rising Ulster Scots resentment over religious, political and economic issues fuelled their emigration to the American colonies, beginning in 1717 and continuing up to the 1770s. Scots-Irish from Ulster and Scotland and British from the borders region comprised the most numerous group of immigrants from Great Britain and Ireland to the colonies in the years before the American Revolution. An estimated 150,000 left Ulster. They settled first mostly in Pennsylvania and western Virginia, from where they moved southwest into the backcountry of the Upland South, the Ozarks and the Appalachian Mountains.

== Legacy ==
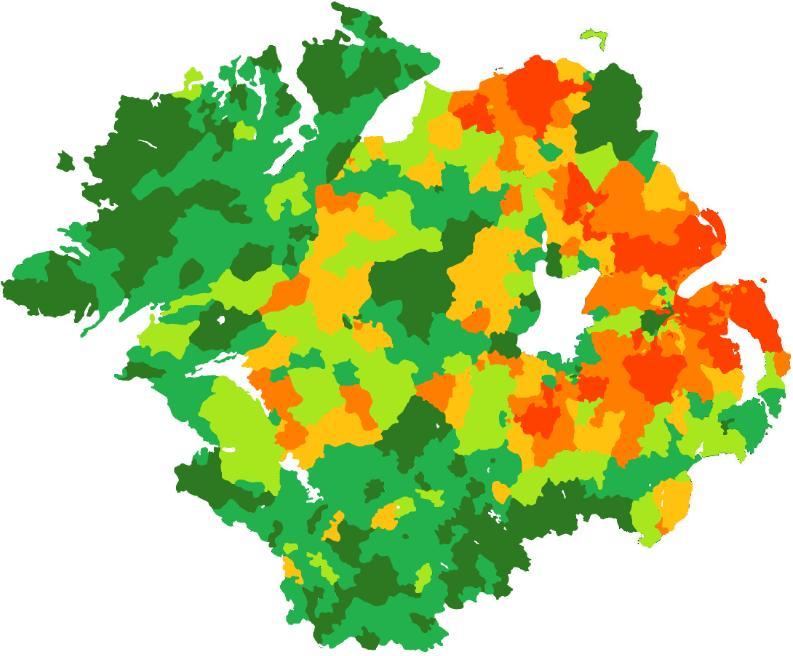
Percentage of Catholics in each electoral division in Ulster. Based on census figures from 2001 (UK) and 2006 (ROI). 0–10% dark orange, 10–30% mid orange, 30–50% light orange, 50–70% light green, 70–90% mid green, 90–100% dark green

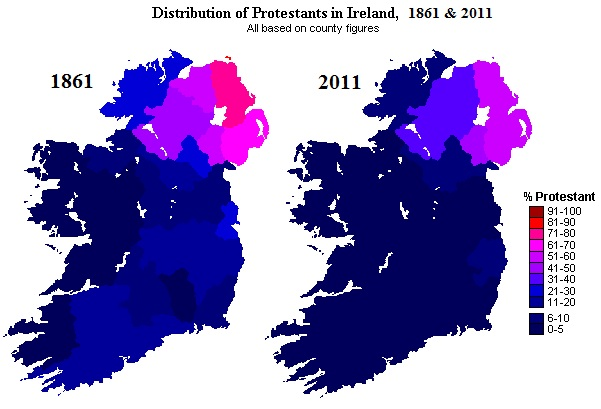
Ireland Protestants 1861–2011 (The (dark) blue areas include other non-Catholics and non-religious).

The legacy of the Plantation remains disputed. According to one interpretation, it created a society segregated between native Catholics and settler Protestants in Ulster and created a Protestant and British concentration in north-east Ireland. This argument therefore sees the Plantation as one of the long-term causes of the Partition of Ireland in 1921, as the north-east remained as part of the United Kingdom in Northern Ireland.

The densest Protestant settlement took place in the eastern counties of Antrim and Down, which were not part of the Plantation, whereas Donegal, in the west, was planted but did not become part of Northern Ireland.

Therefore, it is also argued that the Plantation itself was less important in the distinctiveness of the north-east of Ireland than natural population flow between Ulster and Scotland. A. T. Q. Stewart, a Protestant from Belfast, concluded: "The distinctive Ulster-Scottish culture, isolated from the mainstream of Catholic and Gaelic culture, would appear to have been created not by the specific and artificial plantation of the early seventeenth century, but by the continuous natural influx of Scottish settlers both before and after that episode ...."

The Plantation of Ulster is also widely seen as the origin of mutually antagonistic Catholic/Irish and Protestant/British identities in Ulster. Richard English, an expert on the Irish Republican Army, has written that: "not all of those of British background in Ireland owe their Irish residence to the Plantations ... yet the Plantation did produce a large British/English interest in Ireland, a significant body of Irish Protestants who were tied through religion and politics to English power."

Genetic analysis has revealed that "The distribution [of southwestern Scottish ancestry] in Northern Ireland mirrors the distributions of the Plantations of Ireland throughout the 17th century. Thus the cluster will have experienced some genetic isolation by religion from adjacent Irish populations in the intervening centuries."

The settlers also left a legacy in terms of language. The strong Ulster Scots dialect originated through the speech of Lowland Scots settlers evolving and being influenced by both the Hiberno-English dialect and the Irish language. Seventeenth-century English settlers also contributed colloquial words that are still in current use in Ulster.

== See also ==
- Scotch-Irish Americans
- Scottish names in Ulster

== Bibliography ==
- Bardon, Jonathan (2005) [1992]. A History of Ulster (New Updated ed.). Belfast: Blackstaff Press. ISBN 978-0-85640-764-2 – via Internet Archive.
- Bardon, Jonathan (2011). The Plantation of Ulster. Gill & Macmillan. ISBN 978-0-7171-4738-0.
- Beckett, J. C. (1981) [1966]. The Making of Modern Ireland, 1603–1923. London: Faber & Faber. ISBN 978-0-5711-8036-3.
- Canny, Nicholas (2001). Making Ireland British, 1580–1650. Oxford University Press. ISBN 978-0-19-820091-8 – via Internet Archive.
- Chart, David Alfred (1928). A History of Northern Ireland. Educational Company of Ireland.
- Cullen, Karen J. (2010). Famine in Scotland: The 'Ill Years' of the 1690s. "Scottish Historical Review Monographs" series. Edinburgh University Press. ISBN 978-0-7486-4184-0. JSTOR 10.3366/j.ctt1r279x.
- Curtis, Edmund (2000) [1936]. A History of Ireland: From Earliest Times to 1922 (6th ed.). Routledge. ISBN 0-415-27949-6. A newer edition (8th, 2002) is available.
- Elliott, Marianne (2001). The Catholics of Ulster: A History. New York: Basic Books.
- Elliott, Marianne (20 June 2002). "Personal Perspective". Wars & Conflict: The Plantation of Ulster. BBC History.
- Ellis, Steven (2007). The Making of the British Isles: The State of Britain and Ireland, 1450-1660. Routledge.
- English, Richard (2006). Irish Freedom: The History of Nationalism in Ireland. London: Macmillan.
- Falls, Cyril (1996) [1936]. The Birth of Ulster. London: Constable & Co. ISBN 978-0-09-476610-5 – via Internet Archive.
- Hanna, Charles A. (1902). The Scotch-Irish: Or, The Scot in North Britain, North Ireland, and North America. G. P. Putnam's Sons.
- Jackson, T.A. (1973) [1947]. Ireland Her Own: An Outline History of the Irish Struggle for National Freedom and Independence. New York: International Publishers – via Internet Archive.
- Lenihan, Pádraig (2007). Consolidating Conquest: Ireland 1603–1727. Harlow, Essex: Pearson Longman / Routledge. ISBN 9780582772175. Various newer versions exist but appear to be reprintings, not revised editions.
- Lennon, Colm (1995) [1994]. Sixteenth-Century Ireland: The Incomplete Conquest. New York: St. Martin's Press. ISBN 978-0-312-12462-5 – via Internet Archive.
- Kennedy, Liam; Ollerenshaw, Philip, eds. (2012). Ulster Since 1600: Politics, Economy, and Society. Oxford University Press. ISBN 9780199583119.
- Kennedy, Liam; Miller, Kerby A.; Gurrin, Brian (2012). "Chapter 4: People and population change, 1600–1914". In Kennedy, Liam; Ollerenshaw, Philip (eds.). Ulster Since 1600: Politics, Economy, and Society. Oxford University Press. ISBN 9780199583119.
- Macafee, Caroline I., ed. (1996). Concise Ulster Dictionary. Oxford University Press. ISBN 9780198600596.
- MacRaild, Donald M.; Smith, Malcolm (2012). "Migration and Emigration, 1600–1945". In Kennedy, Liam; Ollerenshaw, Philip (eds.). Ulster Since 1600: Politics, Economy, and Society. Oxford University Press. ISBN 9780199583119.
- Madden, Richard Robert (1857) [1846]. The United Irishmen, Their Lives and Times. Vol. I (1st Series, 2nd ed.). Dublin: James Duffy. pp. 2–5 – via Internet Archive.
- Moody, T. W.; Martin, F. X., eds. (1984) [1967]. The Course of Irish History (Revised & enlarged 2nd ed.). Dublin: Radio Telefís Éireann / Mercier Press. ISBN 9780853427100. A newer edition exists (5th, 2012).
- Ó Siochrú, Micheál (2008). God's Executioner: Oliver Cromwell and the Conquest of Ireland. London: Faber & Faber. ISBN 9780571241217.
- Ó Snodaigh, Pádraig (1995) [1973]. Hidden Ulster, Protestants and the Irish language. Londonderry: Lagan Press. ISBN 9781873687352.
- Perceval-Maxwell, Michael (1999) [1973]. The Scottish Migration to Ulster in the Reign of James I. Belfast: Ulster Historical Foundation. OCLC 633735099.
- Robinson, Philip (2000). The Plantation of Ulster: British Settlement in an Irish Landscape, 1600–1670. Belfast: Ulster Historical Foundation.
- Stewart, A. T. Q. (1989) [1977]. The Narrow Ground: The Roots of Conflict in Ulster (Revised ed.). London: Faber & Faber – via Internet Archive.
