= Ó Snodaigh =

Ó Snodaigh is a surname. Notable people with the surname include:

- Aengus Ó Snodaigh, Irish politician
- Colm Ó Snodaigh, Irish musician
- Pádraig Ó Snodaigh, Irish language activist, poet, writer, and publisher
- Rónán Ó Snodaigh, Irish musician, poet, and vocalist
- Rossa Ó Snodaigh, member of Kíla
