= Bernard Moffatt =

Manx politician

President of Mec Vannin
- In office 1962–present
- Preceded by: Party founded

General Secretary of the Celtic League
- In office 1984–1988
- Preceded by: Alan Heusaff
- Succeeded by: Davyth Fear

Personal details
- Party: Mec Vannin (1962–present)

Bernard Moffatt (born April 1946) is a Manx nationalist politician who was born in Peel, Isle of Man. Both his mother (Millie Cashin) and father (James Moffatt) were Manx. He was educated at Peel Clothworkers School, where Manx dancing classes at the School were organised by Mona Douglas, an icon of the Manx cultural revival. Moffatt was enrolled in one of those teams.

== Early life and education ==
Moffatt's commitment to Manx nationalism was influenced by his early education, which emphasized Manx history, art, and culture. He has stated, "I'm now a fully committed Manx Nationalist," attributing this to his school experiences, including interactions with Mona Douglas and participation in Manx folk dancing.

During his youth, Moffatt became acquainted with several prominent figures in the Manx nationalist and language movement, all from the west of the island. These included the brothers Walter and Leslie Quirk, Jack Irving, and Alfie Cooil. At that time, however, there was no official Nationalist Party in the Isle of Man.

== Mec Vannin ==
Bernard Moffatt was a founder member of Mec Vannin, the Manx Nationalist Party, established in 1962. His participation in the inaugural meeting, along with about a dozen others, is documented in Mec Vannin's original minute book, which is now preserved in the Manx Museum (MNH) Library after being missing for two decades.

=== Early party ideology ===
In its early years, Mec Vannin positioned itself as a national liberation movement, with some members viewing the Isle of Man as being under excessive British influence, akin to a colonial administration. The party explored various approaches to nationalism, including: constitutional reform, direct action and an increased focus on Manx language and culture. There were also efforts to establish connections with Welsh and Irish republican groups. However, it's important to note that Mec Vannin did not adopt a republican stance until over two decades after its formation.

=== Party challenges ===
The party's development was marked by internal conflicts and divisions, which persisted until the mid-1980s. These challenges reflected the diverse opinions within the Manx nationalist movement regarding the best path forward for achieving their goals.

=== Objectives ===
Mec Vannin's primary objective is to achieve national independence for the Isle of Man as a sovereign state, based on a republican form of government. The party also aims to protect and advance Manx interests and safeguard the rights of the Manx people.

=== History ===
==== Bernard Moffatt's involvement ====
Bernard Moffatt's involvement with Mec Vannin fluctuated over a decade before he fully committed to the nationalist movement in the early 1970s. In 1976, Moffatt co-founded the Anti-Militarist Alliance (AMA), a coalition of members from the Manx branch of the Celtic League and Mec Vannin. The AMA's initial focus was to campaign against the presence of military facilities on the Isle of Man, advocating for the closure of an Army base and military bombing range on the island. Additionally, the AMA opposed the use of military facilities on the Island that supported Operation Banner in Northern Ireland during the Troubles. The organization produced the Celtic League and AMA News, a complete archive of which is preserved in the Manx Museum (MNH) Library.

==== Internal conflicts ====
The AMA's activities became contentious among some factions within Mec Vannin, leading to unsuccessful attempts to expel Moffatt and other members. This internal conflict resulted in the departure of disaffected elements, who subsequently established a short-lived "Manx National Party". Moffatt remained with Mec Vannin, holding various executive positions over the years, and was eventually elected Life President.

== Celtic League ==
Moffatt's initial involvement with the Celtic League came in the mid-1970s as a result of the formation in Manning of the AMA. Patricia Bridson (later to become Carn Editor) was the branch secretary at the time. Moffatt eventually succeeded Bridson as Secretary and was later elected Assistant General Secretary to assist Alan Heusaff in overall stewardship of the League. Moffatt eventually succeeded Heusaff as General Secretary and undertook that office from 1984 to 1988 and 1991 to 2006.

During his period as both AGS and General Secretary, Moffatt oversaw the Celtic League's military monitoring campaigns. This was a long-running and diverse campaign covering all facets of military activity in the Celtic countries. It was extensively documented in Carn and a copious file of activities was accumulated.

These files were eventually deposited in the Manx Museum (MNH) Library (additional papers are also lodged in the National Library of Wales) and in November 2008 were featured in a French TV documentary (broadcast globally on TV5 Monde and also on France 3). Moffatt was interviewed by journalist Veronica Weber in the library vault at MNH with the boxes of files.

Military monitoring materials compiled by the League have been drawn on extensively by other sources over the years. A copy of a file on munitions dumping around the British Isles was supplied to the Department of the Marine in the 1990s, and the League's archive was also used in a report compiled for the Japanese National Diet.

In addition, League material was supplied to the reopened Irish government enquiry into the 1968 crash of an Aer Lingus Vickers Viscount. The material was used by the Air Accident Investigation Unit during their investigation, and League queries were responded to in the final report.

Another Celtic League campaign in which Moffatt enthusiastically participated was the initiative to have the Calf of Man (a small island to the south of Man) returned from the National Trust to the Manx nation. This collaborative venture between the Manx and London branches of the Celtic League was ultimately successful.

Moffatt has travelled extensively for the Celtic League, giving papers on nationalism, anti-militarism and civil liberties in the Celtic countries, Switzerland, Romania and Libya.

== Trade unionist ==
Writing in the "Outside Left" column in Isle of Man Newspapers, which he wrote for briefly, in December 2015, Mr. Moffatt, pointed out the misapprehension of many regarding his politics, stating that a secretary in the 1980s Isle of Man TGWU (Transport and General Workers' Union) said (of his application to be a TGWU official), "It’s your politics. You’re a nationalist they will definitely appoint someone from the (Manx) Labor Party. You’re not left-wing.", and added, "I remember being mildly amused at the idea that anyone in the MLP (Manx Labour Party) was left wing." He went on, "In some ways I’m a conservative with a small c."

Moffatt was an active trade unionist from the 1960s. He joined the TGWU while working for the Forestry Board and was a shop steward in the building industry in the early 1970s. He left the TGWU and joined the health union COHSE (Confederation of Health Service Employees) for a period in the mid-1970s, finally rejoining the TGWU in 1980.

Moffatt became branch chairman of the main TGWU branch (the 6/509) and also Chairman of the TGWU Isle of Man District Committee. Eventually he became full-time official for the TGWU on the island. He was involved in fuel oil disputes and brewery strikes, and also coordinated support for striking miners by blocking imports of coal into the island and raising funds.

Through the Trades Council, Moffatt cooperated with others in opposing new trade union laws. In a foreword to On Whose Terms – The Betrayal of the Manx working class he wrote:

"The Isle of Man Government, using the thinly veiled guise of Social Reform, is about to establish new Employment Law. This Social Legislation is designed to provide the State with a security from industrial strife that the old 1936 (Trades Dispute) Act provided. In enacting this legislation Government effectively hopes to hang the same 'albatross' around the neck of organised labour as they did in the 1930s."

Moffatt retired as TGWU full-time official but continued as a member of the IOM Trades Council and also as Secretary of the IOM Whitley Council for several years. He retired completely from Trade Union duties in September 2014. His daughter Angela Moffatt is a full-time official on the IOM for the white-collar and technical union "Prospect".

== Civil liberties ==
Bernard Moffatt has been active in campaigning for reform of laws relating to civil liberties on the island for four decades. In the 1980s, with the assistance of the TGWU and when District Chairman on the island, he lobbied the Home Office, meeting government ministers and urging action to allow the right of individual petition under the European Convention on Human Rights to Manx citizens (this was rescinded in 1976 and not restored until the 1990s).

He has also campaigned for the abolition of capital punishment and judicial corporal punishment (birching), for reform of laws outlawing homosexuality, and for prison reform.

He was a founder member (and Secretary) with other trade unionists of the Manx Council for Civil Liberty which existed in the 1990s and was successful in seeing changes to civil liberties legislation which reformed all the aforementioned issues.

Moffatt was scathing of the Manx government and popular attitudes in the island to civil liberties. Quoting a remark made by a sentencing magistrate, he said:

"I would delight in birching both of you" – Those words spoken by a magistrate nearly 30 ago, to two mentally retarded children, should be burnt into the soul of every Manxman. The remarks represent a bigotry, intolerance and fundamental disregard for civil liberty that existed and is retained to this day. The birch, of course, has since "died the death" and is consigned to "saloon bar" nostalgia for a perceived more disciplined age.

He went on:

For the past thirty years or more this Nation has consistently lacked a leadership that took a firm stand on individual liberty.

Moffatt has presented evidence on behalf of the Celtic League to various international bodies on civil liberties issues. In relation to the Isle of Man this has successfully focused on prison reform.
