= Kerio =

Kerio or Kerío may be:

== Places ==
- Keri, Greece, a town in Greece, is also known as Kerío
- The Kerio River, in northern Kenya
  - Kerio Valley, in Kenya
  - Marakwet East Constituency, an electoral constituency in Kenya, formerly Kerio East Constituency
- Kério, a hamlet in Brittany

== Other ==
- Chiloglanis sp. nov. 'Kerio' is a species of fish in the family Mochokidae
- Kerio Technologies, an American software company

== See also ==
- Kerið, a volcanic crater lake in Iceland
- Elgeyo, Keiyo or Kerio, an ethnic group of the Keiyo District, Kenya
- Keiyo District, a former administrative district in the Rift Valley Province of Kenya
