= Breton News =

Breton News was a magazine set up by Alan Heusaff amongst Breton émigrés in Ireland in the 1950s. It was published in English, French and Breton, and aimed to disseminate information about the political situation in Brittany amongst people in the Celtic countries, which he felt was not being discussed fairly and properly by the French and British media.

Heusaff was amongst the founders of the Celtic League, and Breton News became merged into Carn magazine.
