= Hidden Ulster, Protestants and the Irish language =

1973 book by Pádraig Ó Snodaigh

- Author: Pádraig Ó Snodaigh
- Genre: Non-fiction
- Publication date: 1973

Hidden Ulster, Protestants and the Irish Language is a book by Pádraig Ó Snodaigh published in 1973; revised editions appeared in 1977 and 1995.

The book's thesis was to confirm the cultural—that is, Gaelic—unity between the Irish Catholic natives of Ulster, in northern Ireland, and the Scottish Protestant settlers of the Ulster Plantation. Ó Snodaigh argued there had been a strong tradition of Gaelic-speaking among the Ulster Protestant planters in the 16th and 17th centuries. Ó Snodaigh hoped a shared linguistic heritage would thus improve relations between Northern Ireland's antagonistic sects during "the Troubles".

== Reception ==
The book was strongly criticised by the British and Irish Communist Organisation, which saw it as a Social Democratic and Labour Party-inspired attack on their Two nations theory; Ó Snodaigh replied to their criticisms in subsequent editions. The book was also criticised by the Democratic Unionist Party, but praised by Fortnight Magazine and some members of both the Orange Order and the Ulster Volunteer Force.
