= Rosewarne =

Rosewarne is the name of two places in Cornwall, England.

Rosewarne (Cornish: Roswern) is a hamlet in west Cornwall at grid reference SW610369, in the parish of Gwinear-Gwithian, near Reawla. The name of the hamlet comes from the Cornish language Roswern, containing the elements ros, meaning 'hill-spur', and gwern, meaning 'alder marsh'.

Rosewarne (Cornish: Resuhorn) is also the name of a northern area of the town of Camborne at grid reference SW647410. It gives its name to the nearby Duchy College Rosewarne, which is one of two sites of an agricultural college run by Duchy College within the Cornwall College Group.

== Notable people ==
James Trevenen (1760–1790), an officer in the Royal Navy and the Imperial Russian Navy, was born at the Camborne Rosewarne.
