= Duchy College Rural Business School =

Agricultural school in England

The Duchy College Rural Business School was founded in 2006. It is part of the Cornwall College Group, and its main purpose is to provide a range of services that meet the needs of rural communities, including training opportunities, business support, and an ongoing research program. Richard Soffe is director of the Rural Business School.

== Facilities ==
The Rural Business School is located on two sites: Stoke Climsland in the east of the county of Cornwall and also at Rosewarne in the west. It has a research outpost at Exeter University in Devon and an office in the National Farmers' Union building in Exeter.

== Rural Business Research ==
Rural Business Research (RBR) is a team of British researchers working in the areas of farming, the environment, and rural business. It is a consortium of academic units delivering projects for the government, levy-funded research bodies, research councils, and commercial clients. It runs the Farm Business Survey, which it carries out for Defra.

== Postgraduate Study ==
Postgraduate study is offered through the Rural Business School at Duchy College. The subject matter is based within land-based and rural industry sectors and is offered in a versatile format to accommodate the requirements of students.

== Rural Development Programme for England projects ==
The Rural Business School runs a number of RDPE funded projects. These include:

=== The Skills Programme ===
The Skills Programme offers support funding for training. Training on the Skills Programme is delivered by a partnership led by the Rural Business School. The other partners are the Royal Agricultural University and Lantra.

=== Healthy Livestock ===
The Healthy Livestock Project focuses on controlling the incidence of various conditions in livestock.

=== The Southwest Layers and Game Bird Initiative ===
The Southwest Layers and Game Bird Initiative offers funding for training events, conferences and activities designed to improve flock health. It is driven by the Rural Business School who are running a three-year project funded through the Southwest Healthy Livestock Initiative (SWHLI). This project has been formulated with the West Country Layers Association.

=== SWHLI Knowledge Exchange Project ===
The Rural Business School delivers the South West Healthy Livestock Initiative (SWHLI) Knowledge Exchange project in partnership with the University of Bristol Veterinary School. This initiative recognises the economic and cultural significance of livestock rearing to the region. The project provides knowledge support to SWHLI sector projects at a regional level and communicates the resulting information on the health and welfare of the region’s livestock population to the wider farming community.

=== South West Agricultural Resource Management ===
The main aim of South West Agricultural Resource Management (SWARM) is to share information on resource management within the farming community in the South West Region of England. SWARM works with funding agencies, farming groups and other stakeholders to ensure up to date knowledge on all aspects of farm resource management is available to the local farming community.

=== The Challenge of Rural Leadership Course ===
The Challenge of Rural Leadership Course, a two week residential course run by the Rural Business School of Duchy College in Cornwall, is held at Dartington Hall in Devon each year.

== See also ==
- Combined Universities in Cornwall
