= Movyans Skolyow Meythrin =

Movyans Skolyow Meythrin (MSM) (English: Nursery Schools Movement) is a not-for-profit organisation set up by Rhisiart Tal-e-bot, who is also its current director, since 2009. Based at Cornwall College in Camborne, it aims to spread the Cornish language among small children and their families.

== Skol dy'Sadorn Kernewek ==
Starting in 2009 Skol dy'Sadorn Kernewek provided a Saturday nursery school for young children as well as Cornish lessons for parents at the same time.

== Keur Kernewek ==
In 2012 Tal-e-bot produced Keur Kernewek, a CD of songs in Cornish aimed at children aged under 5. This was done with the help of Gorsedh Kernow, Redruth Town Council, DBS Music, the Cornish Language Partnership and Cornish rock group Hanterhir, who produced some of the tracks, and Plymouth University students at Cornwall College gave assistance. There are 45 tracks of short Cornish songs on the CD with a booklet of lyrics in Cornish and English.

== Skol Veythrin Karenza ==
Skol Veythrin Karenza, set up by MSM in 2013, is to be the first full-time Cornish language nursery school with Ofsted registered status.
