= A. T. Q. Stewart =

Northern Irish historian (1929–2010)

Anthony Terence Quincey Stewart, CBE (8 July 1929 – 16 December 2010), known professionally as A. T. Q. Stewart or Tony Stewart, was a Northern Irish historian, teacher and academic, and a best-selling author on the subject of the politics of Ulster and Northern Ireland. Coming from a Presbyterian background, he was a history master at the Belfast Royal Academy and taught for many years at Queen's University, Belfast.

== Personal life ==
Stewart was born in Belfast, Northern Ireland, in 1929 to Presbyterian parents. He went to school at the Royal Belfast Academical Institution before going on to study history at Queen's University Belfast. He then took a history teacher's job at a school whilst studying for an MA under J. C. Beckett on the topic of radical Presbyterianism in Northern Ireland following the Irish Rebellion of 1798 and why it had changed from an Irish republican to British unionist perspective in the decades following. Following this, he became a lecturer and later reader of Irish political history at Queen's. He married the Queen's English graduate and teacher Anna Robinson and they had two children together. He retired early from Queen's in 1990. He died in 2010 in Belfast.

== Academic work ==
Stewart was critical of the prevailing view of Irish history. He felt it was interpreted with a bias in favour of one political side. He once stated: "There is something wrong with the shape of Irish history; it is too short, too narrow, upside down and it leans all over to one side".

In 1968, he wrote The Ulster Crisis on the establishment of the Ulster Volunteer Force which served as his PhD. In 1977, he wrote his critically acclaimed book The Narrow Ground which was so popular, Reverend Ian Paisley held it up during a Free Presbyterian Church of Ulster sermon calling it "a great book which tells us the truth about the history of Ulster" despite Stewart stating he did not want it to become involved in politics. Stewart received criticism from claims that he was an "apologist for unionism" but he responded stating that Irish nationalism was not the sole preserve of Catholics.
