= Arvor =

Arvor is a given name and surname. Notable people with the name include:

- Arvor Hansen, Danish gymnast
- Sven Arvor, Swedish actor
