= Kério =

Coordinates: 48.0765°N 3.2763°W

Kério (French pronunciation: [keʁjo]) is a small hamlet in Brittany, France in the commune of Ploërdut (1 km away from the center). Kerio has a farm, and is made up of 4 houses and a ruin. Right next to it is a small wood, surrounded by springs, streams, waterfalls and rivers, including the Scorff.
