= Ploërdut =

Ploërdut Pleurdud
- Commune
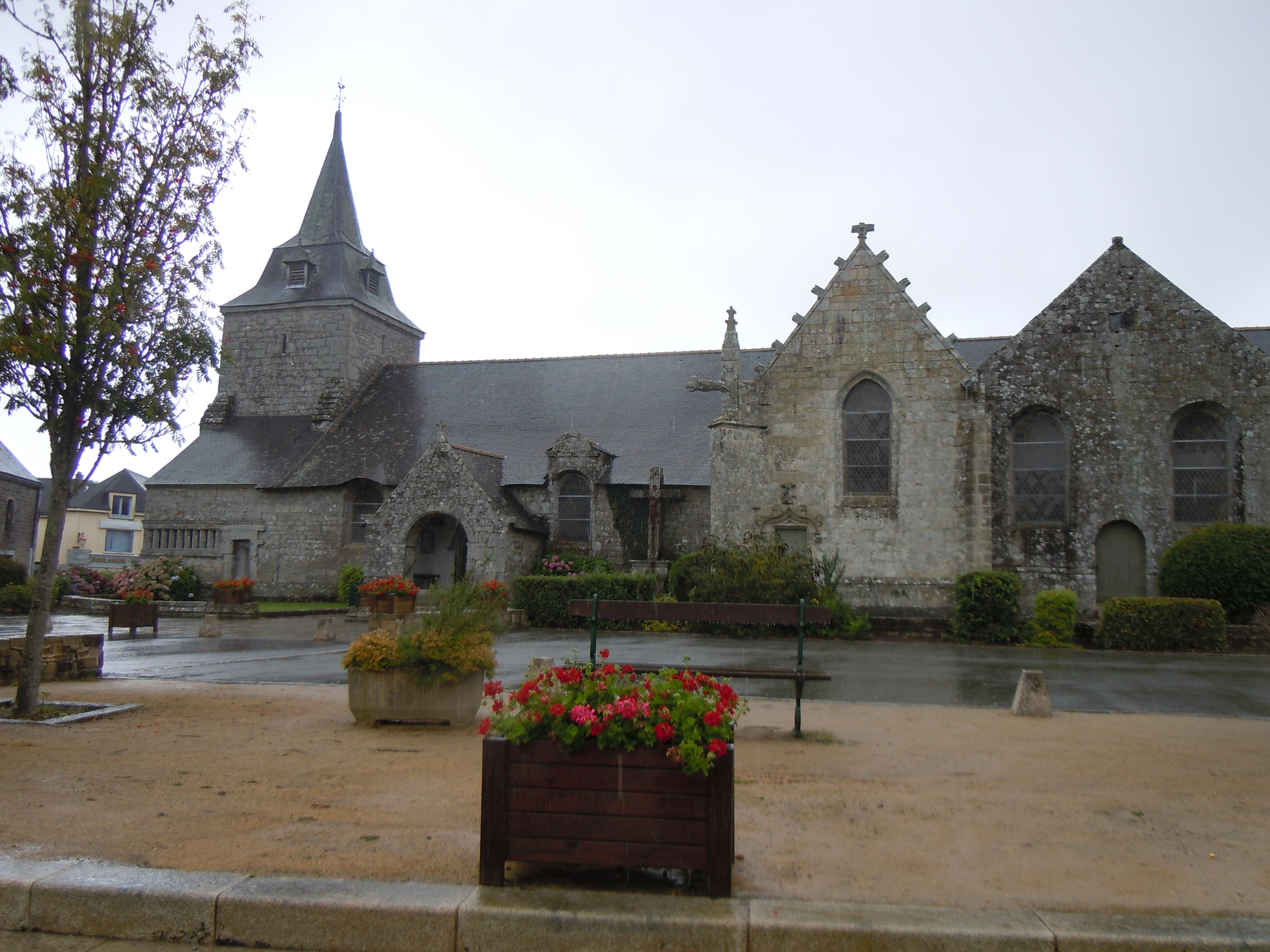
- The Church of Saint-Pierre, in Ploërdut

- Coat of arms
- Location of Ploërdut
- Location within France Location within Brittany
- Coordinates: 48°05′19″N 3°17′14″W
- Country: France
- Region: Brittany
- Department: Morbihan
- Arrondissement: Pontivy
- Canton: Gourin
- Intercommunality: Roi Morvan Communauté

Government
  - Mayor (2026–32): Jean-Luc Guilloux
- Area^{1}: 75.83 km^{2} (29.28 sq mi)
- Highest elevation: 285 m (935 ft)
- Lowest elevation: 114 m (374 ft)
- Population (2023): 1,255
  - Density: 16.55/km^{2} (42.86/sq mi)
- Time zone: UTC+01:00 (CET)
  - Summer (DST): UTC+02:00 (CEST)
- INSEE/Postal code: 56163 /56160
- ^{1} French Land Register data, which excludes lakes, ponds, glaciers > 1 km^{2} (0.386 sq mi or 247 acres) and river estuaries.

Ploërdut (French pronunciation: [ploɛʁdyt]; Breton: Pleurdud) is a commune in the Morbihan department in Brittany in north-western France.

== Population ==
Historical population

Year	Pop.	±% p.a.
1793	4,512	—
1800	4,980	+1.42%
1821	4,425	−0.56%
1831	4,152	−0.63%
1836	3,944	−1.02%
1841	3,908	−0.18%
1846	3,913	+0.03%
1851	3,938	+0.13%
1856	3,791	−0.76%
1861	3,592	−1.07%
1866	3,672	+0.44%
1872	3,189	−2.32%
1876	3,615	+3.18%
1881	3,621	+0.03%
1886	3,590	−0.17%
1891	3,534	−0.31%
1896	3,426	−0.62%
1901	3,640	+1.22%

Year	Pop.	±% p.a.
1906	3,722	+0.45%
1911	3,599	−0.67%
1921	3,464	−0.38%
1926	3,384	−0.47%
1931	3,222	−0.98%
1936	3,155	−0.42%
1946	3,092	−0.20%
1954	2,550	−2.38%
1962	2,260	−1.50%
1968	2,074	−1.42%
1975	1,842	−1.68%
1982	1,575	−2.21%
1990	1,359	−1.83%
1999	1,312	−0.39%
2007	1,264	−0.46%
2012	1,216	−0.77%
2017	1,216	+0.00%
2023	1,255	+0.53%

Source: EHESS and INSEE (1968-2023)

== Geography ==
Ploërdut is located in Northwestern part of Morbihan, 16 km (9.9 mi) east of Le Faouët, 22 km (14 mi) west of Pontivy and 38 km (24 mi) north of Lorient. Historically, the village belongs to Vannetais.

== History ==
The romanesque nave church dates from the eleventh or twelve century.

== Gallery ==
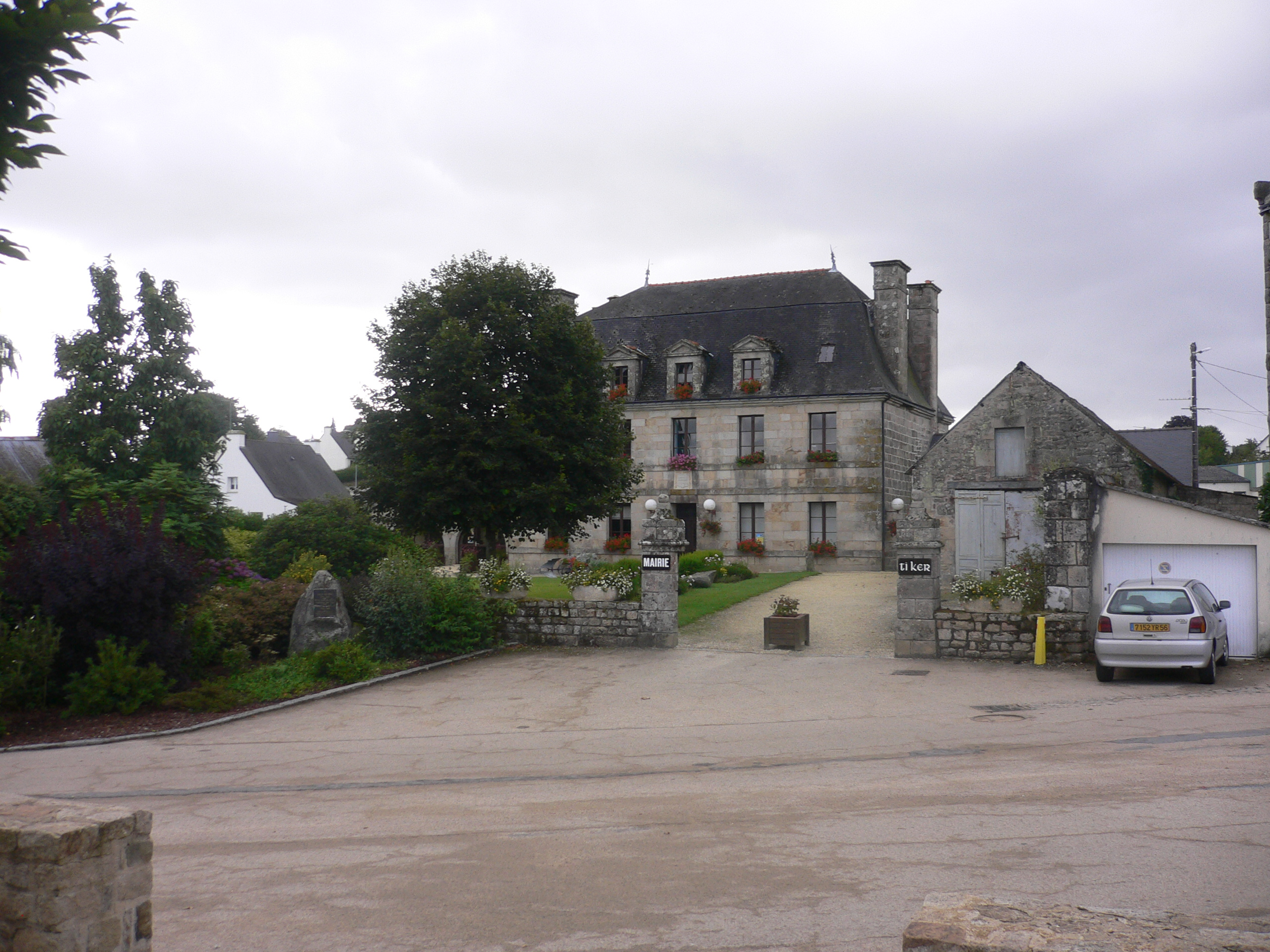
The town hall

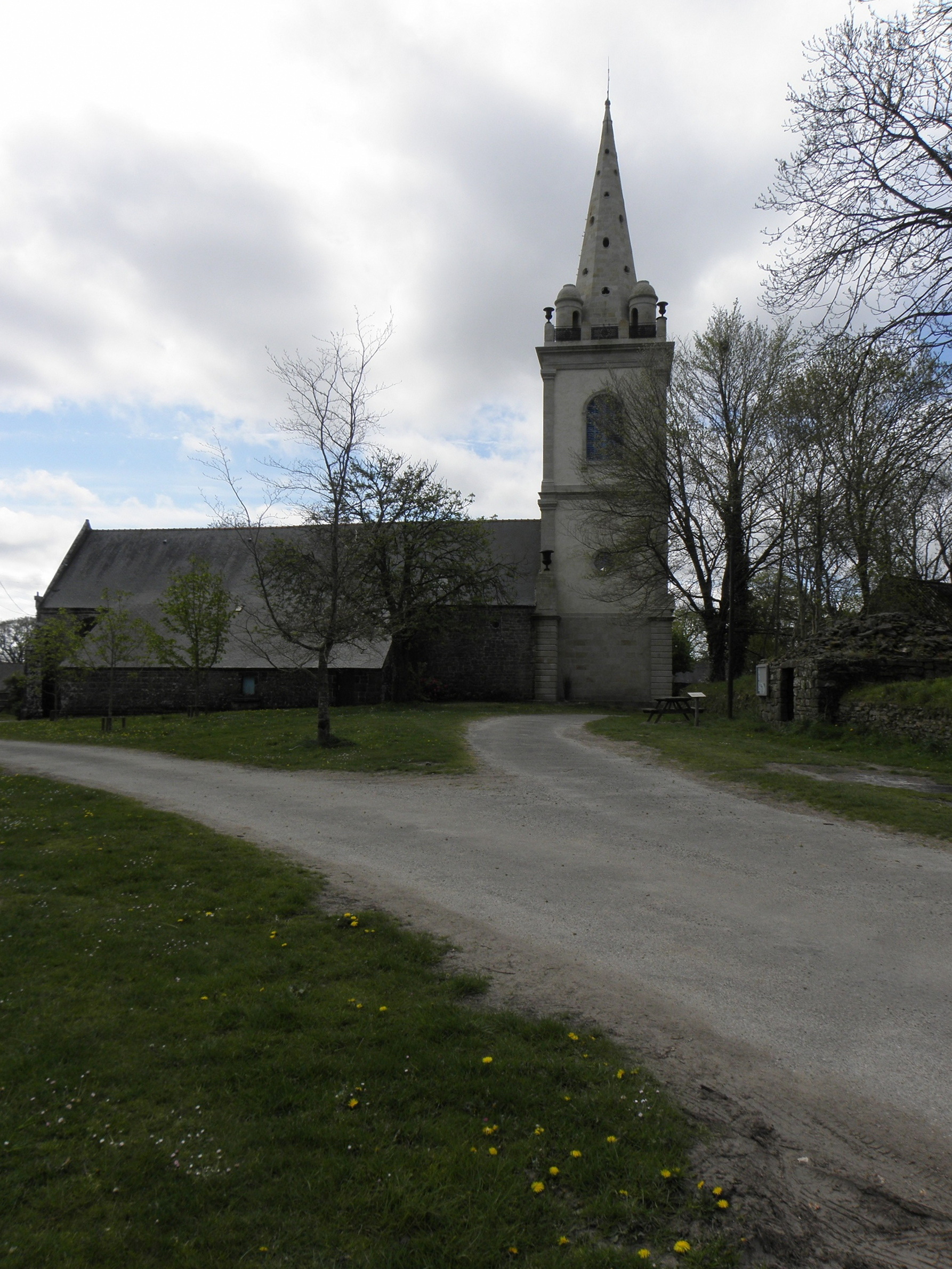
Chapel Notre Dame de Crénénan

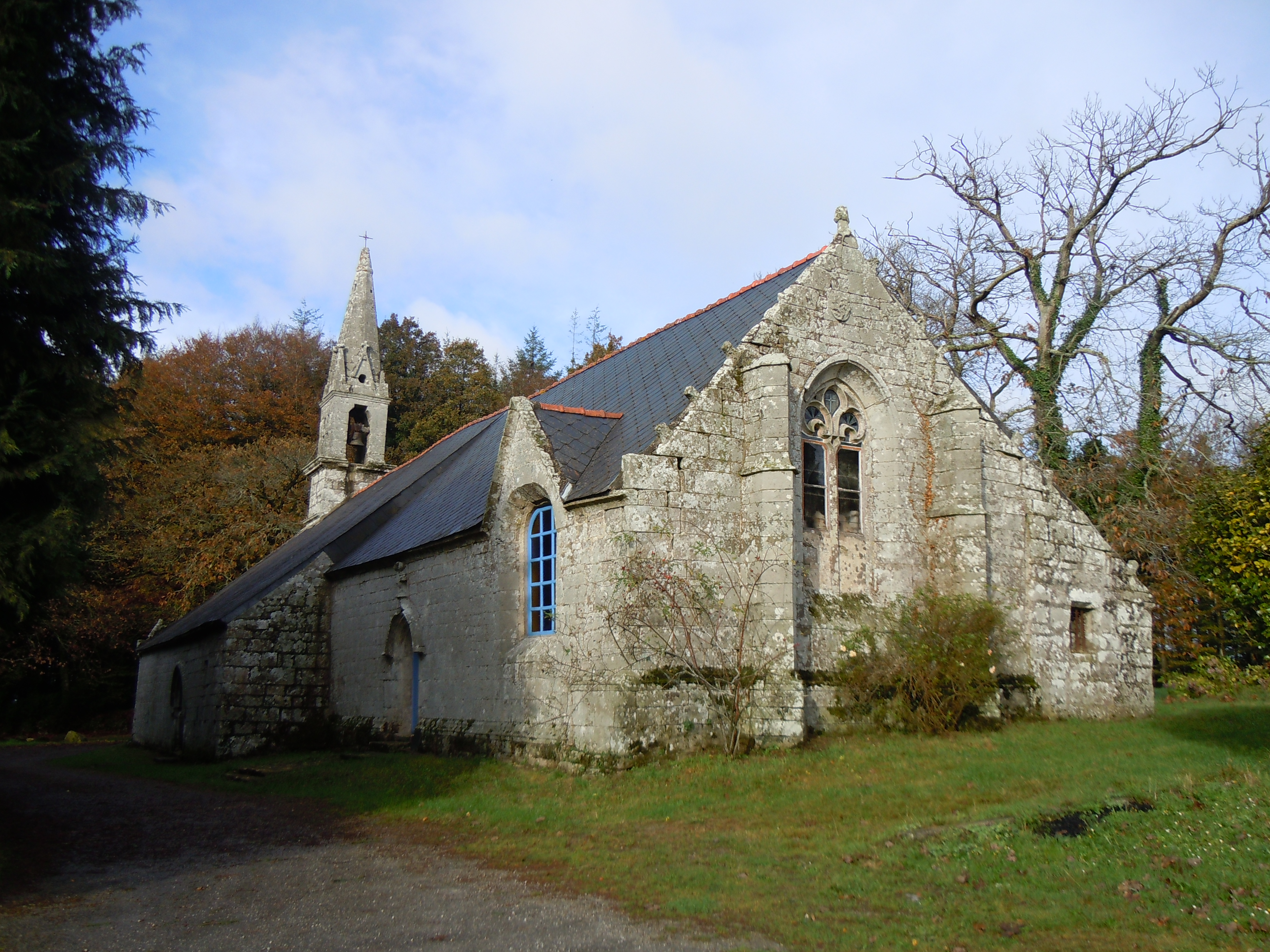
Chapel of Lochrist

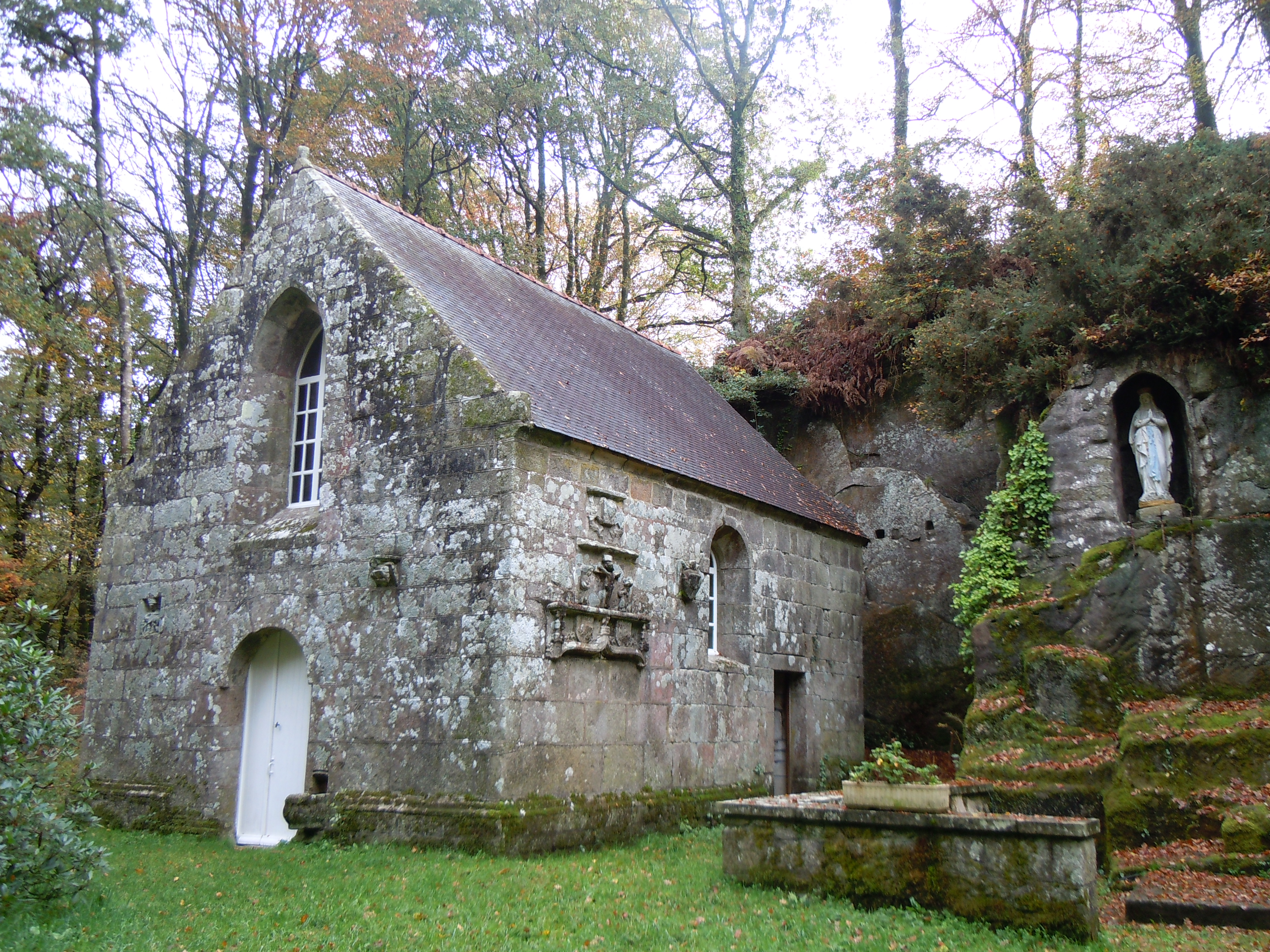
Chapel Notre Dame de la Fosse

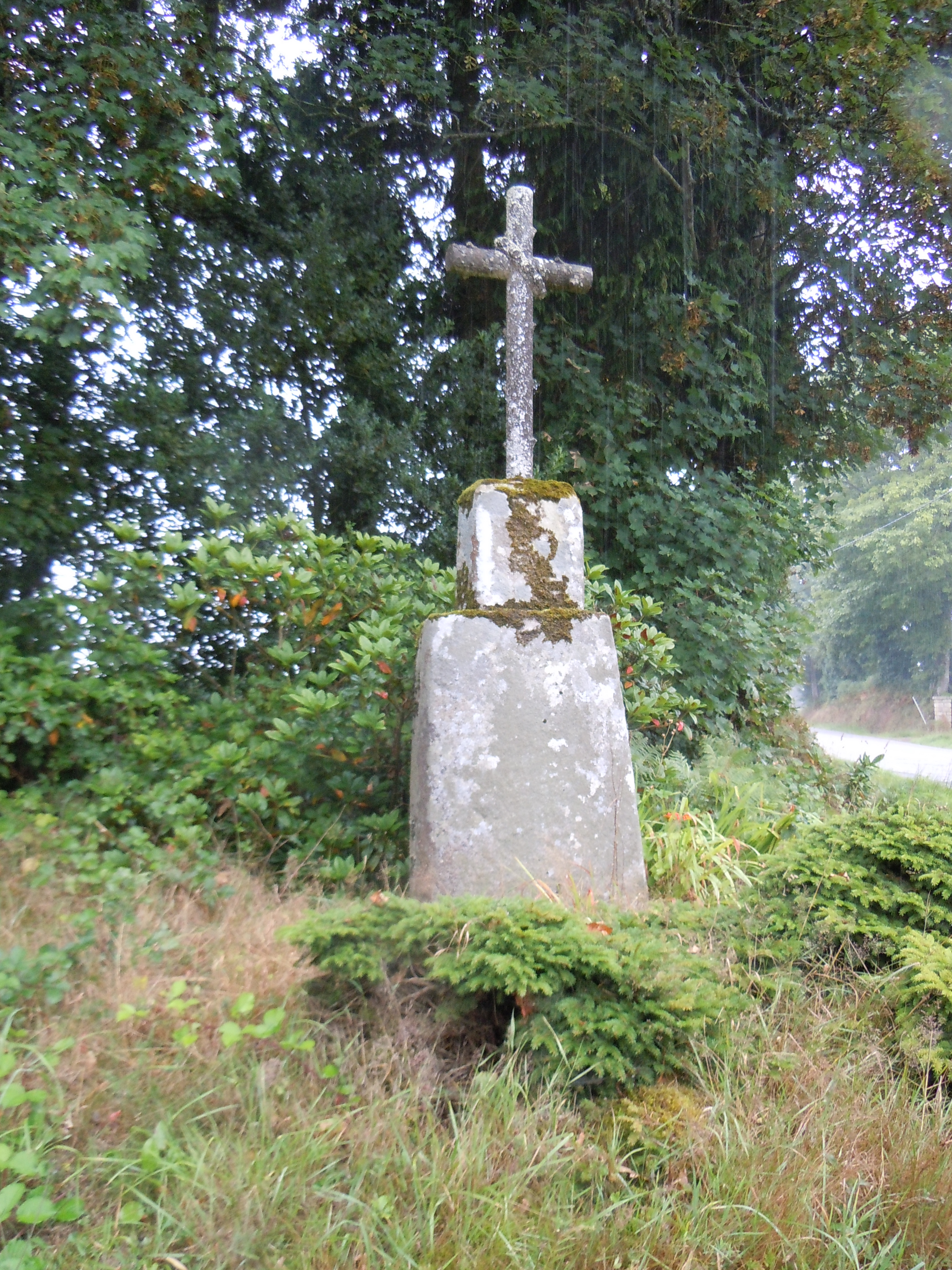
Iron Age stele christianized of Saint Ildut

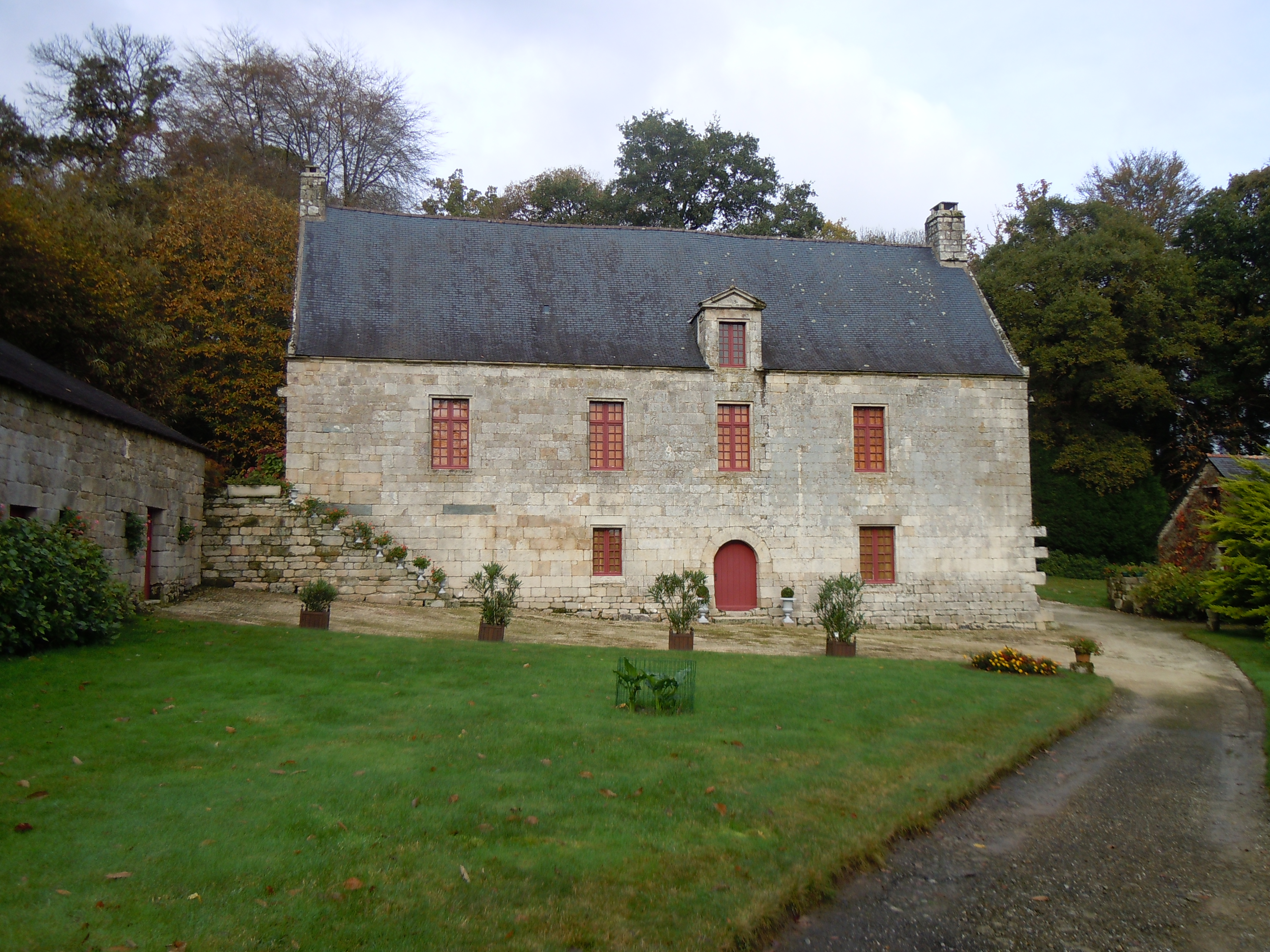
Manor of Kerservant

== See also ==
- Kério, a hamlet of Ploërdut
- Communes of the Morbihan department
