= Celtic League =

Organisation

- An Comann Ceilteach (Scottish Gaelic); An Conradh Ceilteach (Irish); Yn Commeeys Celtiagh (Manx); Yr Undeb Geltaidd (Welsh); An Kesunyans Keltek (Cornish); Ar C'hevre Keltiek (Breton)
- Logo
- Formation: Established in 1961; First publication of Carn in 1973
- Official languages: Breton; Cornish; English; Irish; Manx; Scottish Gaelic; Welsh
- General secretary: Rhisiart Tal-e-bot (2006–present)
- Editor of Carn: Rhisiart Tal-e-bot (2013–present)
- Website: celticleague.net

The Celtic League is a pan-Celtic organization, founded in 1961, that aims to promote modern Celtic identity and culture in Ireland, Scotland, Wales, Brittany, Cornwall and the Isle of Man – referred to as the Celtic nations; it places particular emphasis on promoting the Celtic languages of those nations. It also advocates further self-governance in the Celtic nations and ultimately for each nation to be an independent state in its own right. The Celtic League is an accredited NGO with roster consultative status to the United Nations Economic and Social Council (EcoSoc).

== Aims ==
The Celtic League presents its aims as including:

- "Fostering co-operation between Celtic peoples."
- "Developing the consciousness of the special relationship and solidarity between them."
- "Making our national struggles and achievements better known abroad."
- "Campaigning for a formal association of Celtic nations to take place once two or more of them have achieved self-government."
- "Advocating the use of the national resources of each of the Celtic countries for the benefit of all its people."

"Each Celtic nation is conditioned by a different history and so we must not expect uniformity of thought, but instead allow diversity to express itself within the Celtic League. In this way, we may better recognise those areas of possible co-operation and eventually formulate a detailed common policy. With this we can work out which kind of relations between our communities will enable them to enjoy freedoms and liberties at both individual and community level."

Politically, the Celtic league seeks to create six sovereign states from the six Celtic nations it acknowledges as existing, associated in some way.

The 1987 Celtic League Annual General Meeting stated that it: "firmly reiterates that the Celtic League has a specific function within Celtia, i.e. to work for the reinstatement of our languages to a viable position, and the attainment of sufficient economic, cultural and political autonomy to guarantee the survival of our civilisation into the 21st century. This emphasis on the languages of our six nations marks us now as distinct cultural communities, and therefore as distinct nations."

== History ==
Founded in 1961, the present Celtic League grew out of various other pan-Celtic organisations, particularly the Celtic Congress, but with a more political emphasis. Previously, Hugh MacDiarmid and others had suggested something along the same lines.

The Celtic League was started at the 1961 National Eisteddfod of Wales, which was held at Rhosllannerchrugog near Wrexham in northeast Wales. Two of the founding members were Gwynfor Evans and J. E. Jones, who were respectively president and secretary-general of the Welsh nationalist political party Plaid Cymru at the time. Interest was expressed by Scottish parties, and also by Breton nationalists.

== Branches ==
Scotland Ireland including Northern Ireland Mann Wales Cornwall Brittany including Loire-Atlantique

There are six main, national branches of the Celtic League in the six Celtic countries, generally known by the Celtic language names of their countries: Ireland is known as Éire, Scotland as Alba, Wales as Cymru, Brittany as Breizh, Cornwall as Kernow and the Isle of Man as Mannin or Mann.

When concluding against the inclusion of the allegedly historically Celtic regions Galicia and Asturias (Asturies) in Spain, the 1987 Celtic League Annual General Meeting stated that, because the Celtic League's specific function, "to work for the reinstatement of our languages ... and the attainment of ... political autonomy", must remain undiluted, "this AGM considers that it would be condescending and inappropriate to offer a limited status to the applicant nations [i.e., Galicia and Asturias] within the Celtic League." The AGM expressed that it "encourage[s] them in their efforts to develop the Celtic elements in their heritage" such that "from such areas, might come the support and understanding we need to pursue our aims more effectively"

There are various diaspora branches, that play little part in the annual general meetings:

A Patagonian branch was founded in the Chubut River Valley, Argentina (the location of y Wladfa, a Welsh colony), at the end of 2009; it remained active as of October 2011, with Mónica Jones as secretary and her husband Michael Jones filling an unspecified post.

Celtic League, American Branch (CLAB) was founded in New York City in 1974, and has its own newsletter, but reported decreased activity as of October 2011, the same year its domain name, CelticLeague.org, was lost to a cybersquatter. CLAB organized various annual events, including the Pan-Celtic Conference.

There is a generalized International Branch for "[t]hose living far away from the national branches", including prospective Spanish members in Galicia and Asturias; it was active with a website, Celtic-League.org (operated from the Isle of Man), from 2004 through 2010. There has been a separate England Branch, based in London, active at least from 2004 to 2007. There used to be a branch in Cape Breton Island, Canada, where a small Scottish Gaelic-speaking community still exists; this branch was moribund as of October 2011, though various consultations had taken place in efforts to restart it. The branch was then recorded as being active by 22 January 2015.

== Publications ==
The Celtic League publishes a quarterly magazine, Carn, which highlights political struggles and cultural preservation issues. The articles are produced in the six Celtic languages in addition to English. The cover of the magazine is a map of the six Celtic countries with their respective Celtic-language names beside them. In the past, articles have appeared in French as well. For many years, Carn claimed to be the only regular publication carrying all six Celtic languages.

The Celtic League, American Branch (CLAB) prints its own quarterly newsletter, Six Nations, One Soul, as of October 2011 which provides news of branch activities and events within the Celtic communities in the United States, publishes letters from members, and reviews books and recordings of Celtic interest. CLAB published at least six issues of a larger semi-annual magazine, Keltoi: A Pan-Celtic Review, from 2006 to 2008. CLAB also produced a wall calendar each year, with art from members, appropriate quotations, and anniversaries; publication ceased with the 2008 issue.

=== Campaigns ===
The Celtic League has also passed a motion to support the general aims of Independence First, which aims for a referendum on Scottish independence.

== Posts ==
Nationality is indicated by letters after their names as so:

B – Breton, C – Cornish, I – Irish, M – Manx, S – Scottish, W – Welsh

An arrow indicates the editor relocated to one of the other Celtic countries.

=== General secretaries ===
Alan Heusaff: (1961–84), B→I
Bernard Moffatt: (1984–88), M
Davyth Fear: (1988–90), C
Séamas Ó Coileáin: (1990–91), I
Bernard Moffat: (1991–2006), M
Rhisiart Tal-e-bot: (2006 – present), W→C

=== Editors of Carn (Established 1973) ===
Frang MacThòmais: (1973–74), S
Pádraig Ó Snodaigh: (1974–77), I
Cathal Ó Luain: (1977–81), I
Pedyr Pryor: (1981–84), C
Pat Bridson: (1984-2013), M→I
Rhisiart Tal-e-bot: (2013–present), C

=== Other posts ===
The presidency and vice-presidency ran from 1961 to 1971 and were then abolished. They were held by Gwynfor Evans (W) and Robert McIntyre (S) respectively for the entire duration of the posts. The successor post, chairman, was held by Pádraig Ó Conchúir (I) from 1972 to 1978, then abolished.

J. B. Moffatt was serving as the organisation's director of information as of August 2008.

== See also ==
- Celtic union
- Pan-Celticism
