= Cornwall College, England =

Further education college in Cornwall and Devon in the United Kingdom

Coordinates: 50.346°N 4.785°W

Cornwall College
- Kolji Kernow
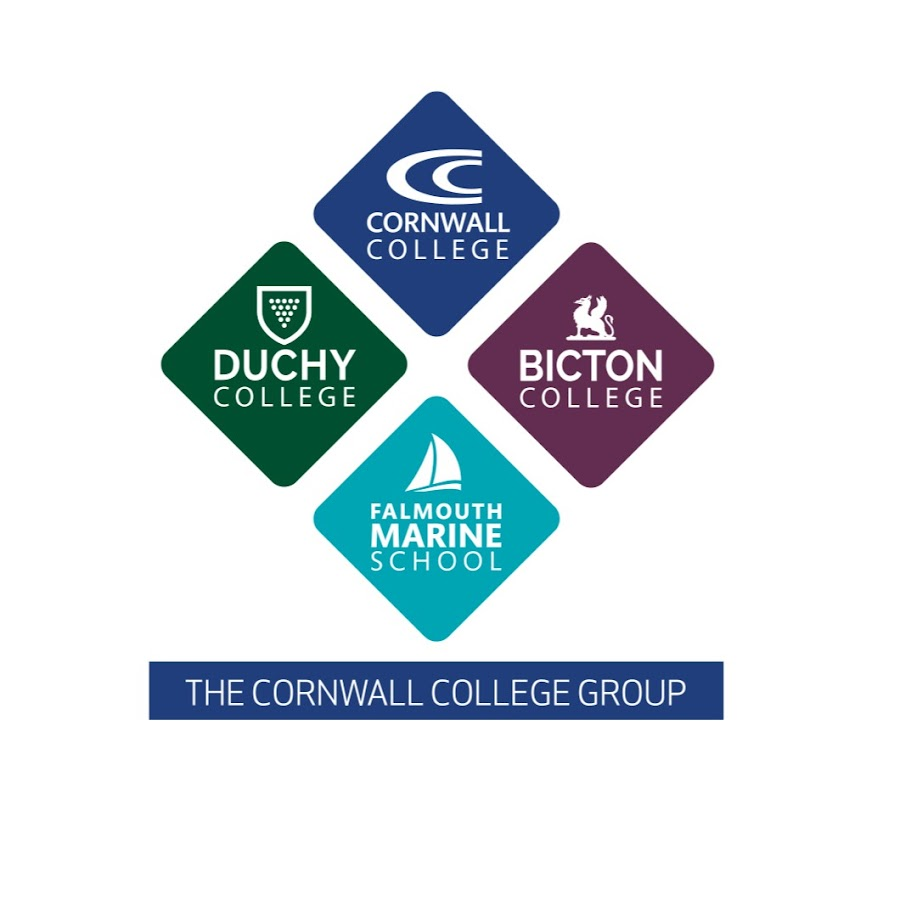

Location
- Camborne, St Austell, Falmouth, Newquay, Rosewarne, Stoke Climsland and Bicton, Devon and Cornwall; United Kingdom

Information
- Type: Further Education College
- Motto: The Career College
- Established: 1929
- Local authority: Cornwall Council
- Department for Education URN: 130627 Tables
- Ofsted: Reports
- Principal & CEO: Rob Bosworth
- Staff: 1,800
- Age: 16+
- Enrolment: 15,000 (10% full-time, 90% part-time)
- Student Union/Association: Cornwall College Students' Union
- Website: cornwall.ac.uk

Cornwall College (Cornish: Kolji Kernow), also known as The Cornwall College Group (TCCG), is an English-language further education college situated on eight sites throughout Cornwall and Devon, England, United Kingdom, with its headquarters in St Austell.

== Campuses ==
There are eight campuses within the Cornwall College group, at Camborne; Newquay; Plymouth Engineering Skills Centre, Sisna Park, Plymouth; St Austell; Duchy College Rural Business School, Rosewarne and Stoke Climsland; Bicton College (Devon); and Falmouth Marine School. Since 2000 Newquay Zoo has provided teaching input and practical opportunities for FE and HE students enrolled at the adjacent Newquay Centre for Applied Zoology Cornwall College Newquay on zoological conservation, education and media courses. The campus is based next to Newquay Zoo. This unusual and innovative partnership project was recognised by a BIAZA zoo education award in 2003 and 2016.

=== Campus redevelopments ===
In 2023, the group announced two new redevelopment plans to the St Austell and Camborne campuses. The funding for the two projects originates from the Department for Education's FE capital transformation fund projects. The DfE targeted some of the worst-condition sites in the country, by working in partnership with 16 colleges to deliver their capital projects.

==== St Austell ====
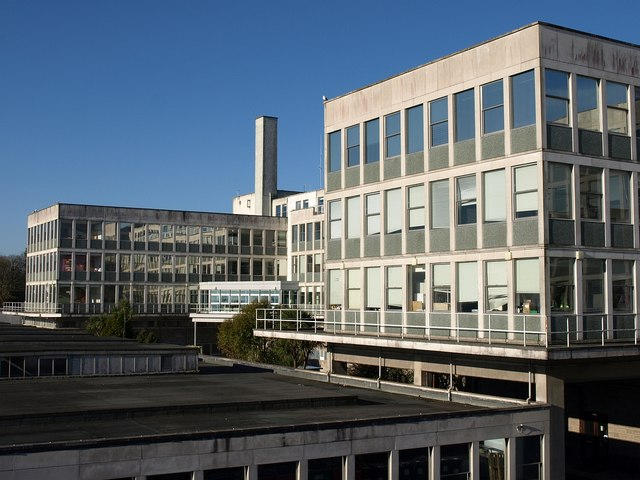

The St Austell campus redevelopment is due to see the removal of John Keay House, acquired by the group at the end of 2002 previously owned by Imerys. The original use of the building was the HQ for English China Clays (ECC) and the top floor originally provided executive dining rooms with views over St Austell Bay. The site was surplus to requirements soon after Imerys acquired ECC.

The two new buildings will aim to create "one of the most modern and engaging college facilities in the country", while also becoming one of the first carbon neutral colleges in the UK.

==== Camborne ====
Skol Veythrin Karenza, the first full-time Cornish language nursery school with Ofsted registered status, opened at the Camborne campus' crèche in 2013.

Camborne's redevelopment is expected to see several buildings refurbished and demolished. According to principal and CE John Evans, it is also expected to see upgrading of classrooms, laboratories and workshops, improving technology, infrastructure, and enhancing accessibility and safety.

Construction work on the Camborne campus started in 2023.

== Courses ==
With more than 15,000 learners each year, The Cornwall College Group is the South West's top performing college for apprenticeships.

It offers in excess of 2,000 technical and professional qualifications, alongside GCSEs and Access to Higher Education.

Courses are offered in Arts, Media & Performing Arts; Business, Administration & Law; Catering & Hospitality; Construction Trades; Conservation, Zoology and Animal Behaviour; Early Years; Engineering; Hair, Beauty & Wellbeing; Information & Communication Technology; Motor Vehicle; Foundation Learning plus English & Maths; Public Services; Science; Social Care & Health; Sport, Fitness & Outdoor; Travel & Tourism; and the School of Education and Professional Development.

In October 2025, the college was granted full degree awarding powers by the Office for Students, meaning it will be allowed to design and deliver its own bachelor's degree courses from May 2026.

== Awards ==
In 2016, it was one of just two colleges to be awarded the Queen's Anniversary Prize for Further and Higher Education.

== Alumni ==
See Category:People educated at Cornwall College

- George Eustice, politician, former MP for Camborne and Redruth and Secretary of State for Environment Food and Rural Affairs
- Richard James (Aphex Twin), Grammy winning electronic/ techno musician
- Toni Pearce, former President of the National Union of Students
