= Pádraig Ó Snodaigh =

Irish language activist, writer and publisher (1935–2025)

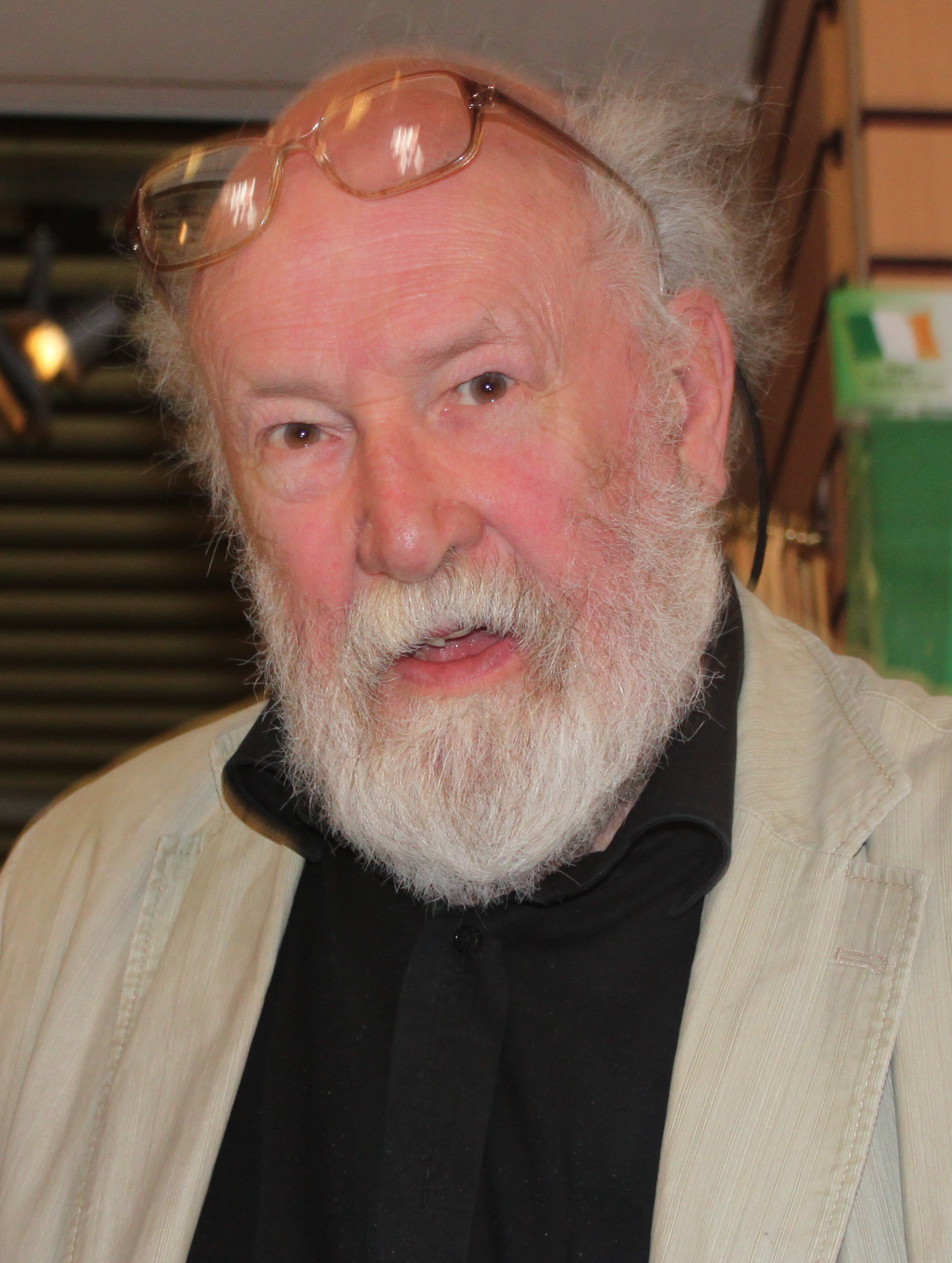
- Ó Snodaigh in 2010
- Born: Oliver Snoddy; 18 May 1935; Carlow, Ireland
- Died: 2 January 2025 (aged 89)
- Known for: Irish language activism
- Notable work: Hidden Ulster, Protestants and the Irish language
- Spouse: Cliodhna Cussen
- Children: 6, including Aengus Ó Snodaigh

Pádraig Ó Snodaigh (born Oliver Snoddy; 18 May 1935 – 2 January 2025) was an Irish language activist, poet, writer, and publisher. He worked for the Irish Electricity Supply Board, and later in the National Museum of Ireland. He was a president of Conradh na Gaeilge, the Gaelic League.

== Life and career ==
Pádraig Ó Snodaigh was born in Carlow, Ireland on 18 May 1935.

From 1970 to 1973, he was co-editor with Mícheál Ó Bréartún of Pobal, an Irish language current affairs magazine. From 1974 to 1977, he was the editor of Carn, the official magazine of the Celtic League. In 1980, Ó Snodaigh founded the publishing company Coiscéim which has published nearly 2,000 books in Irish. In addition he wrote poetry, novels, and historical essays. He co-edited three editions, with Tomás Mac Síomóin, of the political, philosophical and literary journal Lasair. He began a book series in 2006 focusing on reflections on 1916. The series is called, Macallai na Cásca, and there are 24 books in the series thus far.

One of his most famous books is Hidden Ulster, Protestants and the Irish language. Another noted book is Two Godfathers of Revisionism (1991), which contains a discussion of Eugene Kamenka's book on nationalism as well as a critique of the revisionist view of the 1916 Rising in Irish history. Ó Snodaigh argued against the views of this event made by Irish historians F.X. Martin and Francis Shaw (the "two godfathers" of the book's title), whom he claimed are arguing from an anti-nationalist perspective.

Ó Snodaigh was married to the artist Cliodhna Cussen. His son Aengus is a Sinn Féin Teachta Dála. Three of his other sons, Rossa, Rónán, and Colm, are in the band Kíla. His other sons are Cormac and Fergus who owned and operated a security firm for 20 years until 2004.

Pádraig Ó Snodaigh died on 2 January 2025, at the age of 89.

== Irish language publications ==
- Comhghuaillithe na Réabhlóide 1913-1916. Dublin : An Clóchomhar, 1966.
- Paróiste an Fheirtéaraigh agus 1916 Eag. Pádraig Ó Snodaigh, Dublin : Scepter, 1968.
- Ua Rathghaille Dublin : Foilseachain Poblachtacha, 1970.
- Éireannaigh sa Chogadh Chathartha sna Stáit Aontaithe 1970
- An Cómhargadh Dublin : Pobal Teo, 1971.
- An Bealach Romhainn - léacht a tugadh in Áras an Chonartha faoi bhráid Choiste na Cathrach, Baile Átha Cliath, mí Márta, 1974 Dublin, Clódhanna Teo, 1974
- Litreacha oscailte le Pádraic Mac Piarais. Dublin : Club Chonradh na Gaeilge, i bpáirt le Clódhanna Teo, 1979.
- Caomhnú nó athréimniú - óráid an uachtaráin, a tugadh ag ardfheis Chonradh na Gaeilge i mBéal Átha na Slua, 19 Aibreán 1975 Dublin, Clódhanna Teo, 1975
- Rex: Dublin, Coiscéim, 1981.
- Véinéiseach Éigin: Guiseppe Berto aistrithe ag Pádraig Ó Snodaigh, Dublin, Carbad, 1983.
- Cumha agus Cumann: Aisling Design, Dublin, 1985.
- Solitudine e Compagnia/Cumha agus Cumann: poesie di Pádraig Ó Snodaigh a cura di Rosangela Barone e G. Lendaro Camiless, Bari - Edizioni dal Sud, Italy, 1986.
- Linda: Dublin, Coiscéim, 1987.
- Cúl le cúl : Dublin : Coiscéim, 1988.
- Eadar mi 's a' bhreug, Màiri NicGumaraid; leaganacha Gaeilge, Pádraig Ó Snodaigh & Liam Prút. Coiscéim, 1988.
- Ó Pharnell go Queenie. Dublin : Coiscéim, 1991.
- Ceatharlach i 1798 : amharc ar na staraithe Dublin : Coiscéim thar ceann Cumann Oidhreachta Chontae Cheatharlach, 1991.
- An tAmhrán Éireannach : (i gcuimhne Bobby Sands).Conte, Guisseppe. (leagan gaeilge le Pádraig Ó Snodaigh). Dublin : Coiscéim, 1991.
- Unshed Tears - Deora Nár Caoineadh, Áine Ní Ghlinn arna aistriú ag Pádraig Ó Snodaigh. Coiscéim/Dedalus Press, 2002.
- Ón Droichead go dtí an Duibheagán : Téamaí staire ón tréimhse Nollaig 1921 go tús Chogadh na gCarad. Coiscéim, 1997.
- Ruithmean's neo-rannan/Rainn agus neamhrainn, Màiri NicGumaraid; leaganacha Gaeilge, Pádraig Ó Snodaigh & Liam Prút. Coiscéim, 1997.
- Dílseoirí na Gaillmhe - faoi airm agus éide 1798 roimhe agus ina dhiaidh:. Coiscéim, 1998.
- Len: - translated into Italian by Rosangela Barone, Faenza - Moby Dick, Italy, 1999.
- Vae Puero: athleaganacha ar dhánta le Pádraic Fiacc, arna aistriú ag Aogán Ó Muircheartaigh & Pádraig Ó Snodaigh. Coiscéim, 2002.
- Cronú: Dublin, Coiscéim, 2004.
- Macallaí na Cásca 4 - Na Priompalláin - 1916 agus athscríobh na staire, Dublin : Coiscéim, 2006.
- Macallaí na Cásca 9 - 1916 agus mar sin de, Dublin : Coiscéim, 2013.
- Smaointe Fánacha: D. Ó Maol Blagaide, Dublin, Coiscéim, 2013.
- Clamavi: Dublin, Coiscéim, 2014.
- Macallaí na Cásca 13 - Comhghuaillithe na Réabhlóide 1913-1916, Dublin : Coiscéim (ath-chló), 2016.
- Ag Druidim le 80, Dublin, Coiscéim, 2018.
- Scórscéalta, Dublin, Coiscéim, 2021
- Ochtó Seacht FA, Dublin, Coiscéim, 2022.
- Scór Eile, Dublin, Coiscéim, 2022.
- An Tríú Scór, Dublin, Coiscéim, 2022.
- Cuimhne Míosa, Dublin, Coiscéim, 2022.
- Scór a Ceathair, Dublin, Coiscéim, 2023.
- Fómhar na nDeor, Dublin, Coiscéim, 2023.
- Scór 5, Dublin, Coiscéim, 2023.
- Scór 6, Dublin, Coiscéim, 2024.
- Faoi Láthair, Seal, Dublin, Coiscéim, 2025. (forthcoming)

== English language publications ==
- Ireland and the Common Market : a second Act of Union? Dublin : Common Market Study Group, 1972.
- Hidden Ulster. Dublin : Clodhanna Teo, 1973. (Revised editions appeared in 1977 and 1995).
- Modern literature in Irish : survival, revival, arrival, London : Connolly Association, c.1984.
- Irish Political Documents: 1916-1949, Blackrock : Irish Academic Press, 1985.
- Irish Political Documents, 1869-1916, Dublin : Irish Academic Press, 1989.
- Two Godfathers of Revisionism : 1916 in the Revisionist Canon, Dublin : Fulcrum Press, 1991.
- The Irish volunteers 1715-1793 : a list of the units, Blackrock, Co. Dublin : Irish Academic Press, 1995.
- Nollaig with Rudi Holzappel, 1964
- Poems with Colm O'Neill, Conleth Ellis & James O'Rourke
