= Carn =

Magazine of the Celtic League

- Carn Issue 136, cover dated Winter 2006/07
- Editor: Rhisiart Tal-e-bot
- Categories: Celtic languages, Celtic nations, Modern Celts, Politics
- Frequency: Quarterly
- First issue: 1973; 53 years ago
- Company: The Celtic League
- Country: United Kingdom
- Language: Breton, Cornish, English, Irish, Manx, Scottish Gaelic, Welsh
- Website: http://celticleague.net/carn/
- ISSN: 0257-7860

Carn is the official magazine of the Celtic League. The name, a Celtic word which has been borrowed into English as 'cairn', was chosen for its symbolic value and because it can be found in each of the living Celtic languages. The subtitle is: 'A Link Between the Celtic Nations'.

== Overview ==
Founded in 1973, Carn is dedicated to highlighting and furthering the aims of the Celtic League, including language preservation and self-determination for the Six Celtic Nations.

The articles are published in English, with articles also in the six Celtic languages: Breton, Cornish, Irish, Manx, Scottish Gaelic, and Welsh, with translations and summaries in English. In the past, articles have also appeared in French.

Notable contributors have included the Scottish Gaelic poet Sorley MacLean.

The cover of the magazine for a number of years has been a map showing the various Celtic countries, notated with their names in their respective native languages.

== Editors ==
The editors of Carn have included:

- Frang MacThòmais (1973–1974), Scottish
- Pádraig Ó Snodaigh (1974–1977), Irish
- Cathal Ó Luain (1977–1981), Irish
- Pedyr Pryor (1981–1984), Cornish
- Pat Bridson (1984–2013), Manx (living in Ireland)
- Rhisiart Tal-e-bot (2013–present), Welsh-Cornish
