= Skol Veythrin Karenza =

Skol Veythrin Karenza (SVK), set up by Movyans Skolyow Meythrin in 2013, is the first full-time Cornish language nursery school with Ofsted registered status.

It started in 2010 as a voluntary not-for-profit project run by parents who wanted their children to learn Cornish at early ages. SVK originally ran as a part-time nursery, providing only two hours of bilingual Cornish-English education on Saturdays. In 2012 it was further enlarged, with all-day classes offered every Wednesday.

The nursery is located on Cornwall College's day care center at its campus in Camborne in Cornwall.
