= Celtic union =

Political proposal

A Celtic union or Celtic alliance refers to political unity between the Celtic nations either within the UK or together as independent countries.

== Historical proposals ==
In 1864, poet Charles de Gaulle proposed a Celtic Union that would establish and develop links between Celtic countries. There should also be a Celtic lingua franca, created from common elements in all Celtic languages, and a pan-Celtic festival.

== 'Celtic Alliance' – co-operation within the UK ==
=== National cooperation ===
In November 2016, the First Minister of Scotland, Nicola Sturgeon stated the idea of a "Celtic Corridor" of the island of Ireland and Scotland appealed to her.

In June 2022, Bangor University lecturer and journalist, Ifan Morgan Jones has suggested that "a short-term fix for Wales, Scotland and Northern Ireland might be a greater degree of cooperation with each other, as a union within a union." he also suggested that "If they could find a way of working together in their mutual interest, that’s a fair degree of combined influence, particular if the next General Election produces a hung parliament."

In July 2023, the Welsh Government announced a "Celtic Heritage – Cornwall-Wales Collaboration Agreement" focused on cooperation in the following areas;

- sustainable housing
- achieving net zero
- rural economies
- culture and language

In August 2023, political leaders from Ireland, Scotland, Wales, Cornwall, Brittany, Galicia and Asturias met at the first ever Celtic Forum. Areas of discussion included a "Celtic Erasmus", Maritime transport, fishing & offshore wind power and native languages. Native languages include; Asturian, Breton, Cornish, Galician, Irish, Scottish, and Welsh.

=== Party cooperation ===
In June 2001, Plaid Cymru and the Scottish National Party (SNP) formed a joint parliamentary group with 9 MPs, in a bid to give them more power in Parliament.

In 2010, Plaid Cymru and the SNP formed a "Celtic Alliance" with the aim of increasing their influence on a UK government via agreements over policies and funding in the event of a hung parliament.

In a Plaid Cymru conference in 2019, leader of Sinn Fein, Mary Lou McDonald stated "We need a pan-celtic anti-Tory political culture. A shared political culture that respects each other’s sovereignty and right to nationhood. A shared political culture grounded in principles of common interest and common purpose." She echoed these views in a supportive video message to YesCymru in July 2022.

In October 2025, Plaid Cymru and the SNP were in talks to form a 'progressive alliance' ahead of the 2026 elections for Holyrood and the Senedd, and for potential national collaboration following the elections.

== Celtic Union of independent countries ==
In March 2017 a letter to the Irish Times proposed a Celtic union of Northern Ireland, the Republic of Ireland, and Scotland as an alternative to Brexit where "Northern Ireland is a swing vote".

In April 2017, a Celtic union of the whole of Ireland, Scotland and Wales was proposed as an alternative to Brexit. Such a union would require the independence of Scotland and Wales and the reunification of Ireland

In January 2019 the leader of the Welsh nationalist Plaid Cymru party, Adam Price spoke in favour of cooperation among the Celtic nations of Britain and Ireland following Brexit. Among his proposals were a Celtic Development Bank for joint infrastructure and investment projects in energy, transport and communications in Ireland, Wales, Scotland, and the Isle of Man, and the foundation of a Celtic union, the structure of which is already existent in the Good Friday Agreement according to Price. Speaking to RTÉ, the Irish national broadcaster, he proposed Wales and Ireland working together to promote the indigenous languages of each nation.

In August 2019, Alastair Kneale of the Celtic League Mannin Branch said that the Isle of Man should also be open to a Celtic union.

In the same month, Jason O'Toole writing for the Irish Mirror suggested a 'Celtic Pact' between Ireland, Northern Ireland, Scotland and Wales, similarly to the Scandinavian Nordic Council.

In June 2020, journalist Gina Tonic suggested a "United Celtic Republic" including Scotland, Wales, Cornwall, Isle of Man, Brittany and a United Ireland.

In July 2020, the potential "Celtic Corridor" bridge between Scotland and Northern Ireland was proposed as a potential link for a Celtic union.

In 2022, journalist Jamie Dalgety has also proposed the concept of a Celtic Union involving Scotland and Ireland but suggests that lack of support for Welsh independence may mean that a Gaelic Celtic Union involving may be more appropriate.

== See also ==
- The concept of Pan-Celticism

Celtic union may also refer to:

- A pan-Celticist society founded in 1853 by Robert Cane (active 1853–1858)
- A pan-Celticist society founded by a faction of the Celtic Congress in 1947 (active 1947–1950), see Celtic Congress
