= Progressive alliance (UK) =

Cross-party UK political alliance

A progressive alliance in the UK is a cross-party political alliance supporting "progressive politics", generally in opposition to right-wing parties, namely Reform UK and the Conservative Party.

== History ==
=== 20th century ===
The term progressive alliance has been used to describe the Gladstone–MacDonald pact, the 1903 agreement between the Liberal Party and the Labour Representation Committee (forerunner to the Labour Party) to stand aside for each other in constituencies.

In the 1930s, the movement for a Popular Front called for a broad anti-fascist alliance involving Labour, the Liberals, the Communists and anti-fascist Conservatives. This policy was strongly supported by the Communist Party, whilst supporters of the Popular Front such as Stafford Cripps achieved a significant degree of influence within the Labour Party at this time, particularly after the outbreak of the Spanish Civil War in 1936; however, the Labour Party Conference voted against a Popular Front policy on several occasions.

Clement Attlee's post-war "progressive alliance" in the Labour Party saw the introduction of the National Health Service, comprehensive education and the welfare state.

During the 1980s, calls for an alliance of parties opposed to the policies of Margaret Thatcher grew during a period where the Thatcher government inflicted a number of defeats on the labour movement. One of the key figures arguing for such an alliance was the historian Eric Hobsbawm, whose article "The Forward March of Labour Halted" suggested that the working class was not powerful enough to secure the implementation of socialist policies and that cross-class alliances were essential for progressive politics. These sentiments were particularly widespread in the Eurocommunist wing of the Communist Party, and the party's theoretical journal Marxism Today, although they were also widely influential within the soft left of the Labour Party.

Green Party politician and academic Rupert Read has described the tactics of Labour and the Liberal Democrats in the 1997 general election, when they focused on attacking the Conservatives rather than each other, as a precedent for a progressive alliance.

=== 21st century ===
The idea of a progressive alliance was mooted in the run-up to the 2015 general election. For example, the phrase was used by Scottish National Party leader Nicola Sturgeon, Green Party leader Natalie Bennett, and Plaid Cymru leader Leanne Wood.

The idea was also proposed in the run-up to the 2017 general election and after the 2016 United Kingdom European Union membership referendum, in which the vote to leave the EU ("Brexit") was won by a small majority. The concept of building cross-party alliances, with the asserted aim of working together to ensure the best possible future for the people and country, was debated at a public meeting entitled "Post-Brexit Alliance Building" held on 5 July 2016, hosted by the think tank Compass. The idea became linked to opposition to a "hard" Brexit.

In 2019, such tactical voting to prevent a hard Brexit was advocated by the Liberal Democrats, Green Party and Plaid Cymru, in the run-up to that year's General Election. Each party announced that it had agreed to stand down Parliamentary candidates for each other, in seats where one of them had a realistic prospect of winning, if votes were not split between them.

The idea has been taken up by a number of independent organisations. The concept has not been adopted as official policy by any political party, but the Green Party of England and Wales have pushed for a coordinated top-down and bottom-up approach to the idea. Caroline Lucas, co-leader of the Green Party of England and Wales, argued for multiple local alliances for the best party to oppose the Conservatives and with a focus on bringing in electoral reform. Several grassroots organisations, Facebook groups and Twitter accounts have sprung up with similar names and aims, with tactical voting being encouraged. Compass has been reported as coordinating a campaign group called Progressive Alliance.

There are no mutually agreed policy aims between the various organisations, but these would likely include electoral reform to change the voting system (e.g. proportional representation). The name itself is somewhat unclear as there is no agreed definition of progressivism in British politics. There are dissenting views on the benefits of such an alliance, and debate as to whether it could make a difference to the electoral outcome.

Local campaigns towards standing a single progressive candidate exist in a number of regions, with the Green and Liberal Democrat parties agreeing to stand down candidates in neighbouring constituencies in quid pro quo deals. For example, in South West Surrey in 2017, the National Health Action Party's Louise Irvine was selected by a public meeting run by the local Compass group to run as a progressive alliance candidate.

In her campaign for the 2020 Liberal Democrat leadership election, MP Wera Hobhouse advocated a progressive alliance with the Greens and Labour, arguing that the Lib Dems "need to abandon equidistance between the Conservative and Labour Parties".

Following the 2021 local elections, Dr Kevin Hickson (University of Liverpool) and Dr Jasper Miles (Queen Mary University London) expressed doubt about the chances of a progressive alliance. In August 2021, Labour Party leader Keir Starmer ruled out working with the Scottish National Party or any progressive movement on an electoral pact.

In October 2025, ahead of the 2026 Scottish Parliament and Welsh Senedd elections, SNP leader John Swinney and Plaid Cymru leader Rhun ap Iorwerth announced that they had held talks in order to develop a "progressive alliance". The news came in the aftermath of the Plaid victory in the 2025 Caerphilly by-election. The two parties had previously formed a Westminster parliamentary group in the 2001-2005 Parliament, becoming the third largest opposition party with 9 seats (5 SNP, 4 Plaid Cymru) after the Conservatives with 166 seats and the Liberal Democrats with 52.

== See also ==
- Lib–Lab pact
- Liberal Democrat–Green Party alliance
- Celtic union
- Unite to Remain
