= Edmund Edward Fournier d'Albe =

Irish physicist and chemist (1868–1933)

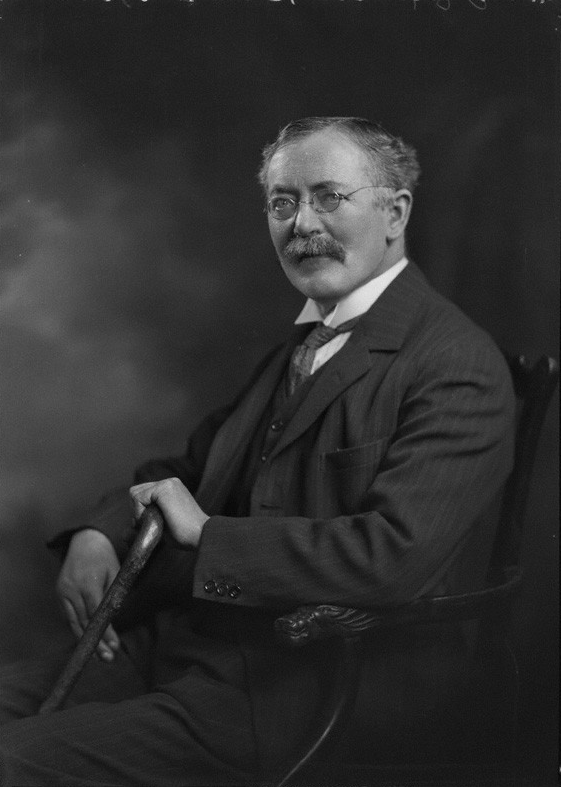
D'Albe in 1932

Edmund Edward Fournier d'Albe (1868 – 29 June 1933, St. Albans, UK) was an Irish physicist, astrophysicist and chemist. He was a university professor and distinguished himself in the study and popularization of electromagnetism, as well as the beginnings of astrophysics. He also experimented with improving radio and television.

In addition, he was interested in questions about immortality and held interests in parapsychology and spiritualism. He was one of the originators of pan-Celticism.

== Life and career ==
Fournier d'Albe was from a French Calvinist family which emigrated to Ireland after the revocation of the Edict of Nantes in 1685. He was born in London in 1868. His father, Edward Herman Fournier d'Albe was a physicist and telegraph engineer.

He served as Assistant to George Francis FitzGerald in Trinity College Dublin during the closing years of the 19th century. In 1899 he taught mathematics at University College, Dublin. He was an assistant lecturer of physics at the University of Birmingham starting in 1910, and in October 1914 he went to teach at the University of the Punjab in Lahore. He retired in 1927 after a stroke that left him with a paralyzed hand, but he continued to write in his chosen fields. Fournier d'Albe was the inventor of the optophone and worked as an assistant to the physicist Oliver Lodge. He worked for three years as the secretary at the Dublin section of the Society for Psychical Research.

He originally endorsed spiritualism after becoming convinced of the work of William Crookes with the medium Florence Cook. However, by 1921 he had become skeptical of physical mediumship after detecting trickery from the medium Kathleen Goligher but was a believer in the supernatural. In 1920, he translated Phenomena of Materialization by Albert von Schrenck-Notzing and in 1923 he authored a biography of Crookes.

== Celtic revival ==
Fournier d'Albe's first involvement was through the Feis Ceoil, an annual music festival to promote Irish music. The first was held in Dublin in 1897, and he was elected Registrar of the Feis due his skill in business management. As a delegate of the Feis, he attended other music and literary festivals such as the National Eisteddfod of Wales.

At the behest of the Feis Ceoil Association he travelled to Wales, where he was initiated into the Gorsedd Cymru.

In 1898, the Highlands, Wales, Brittany, and the Isle of Man were represented at the Feis Ceoil held in Belfast, and Fournier d'Albe took the occasion to form a provisional committee to organize a Pan-Celtic Congress in Dublin.

Together with Robert Boyd White, he is credited with making the first ever translation in 1908 of an Irish text into Esperanto—a passage from the Book of Lismore entitled Eachtra Laoghaire Mic Criomthain go maigh meall. Fournier advocated Esperanto as a means to free Celts from the "linguistic incubus of their powerful neighbours or overlords". In 1926 he lectured in Esperanto on the topic of "Wireless telegraphy and television" at the second international Esperanto Summer University in Edinburgh.

== Selected works ==
- An English-Irish Dictionary and Phrase Book, Dublin: The Celtic Association, 1903.
- The Electron Theory: A Popular Introduction to the New Theory of Electricity and Magnetism, London, New York, Bombay: Longmans, Green, and Co., 1906.
- Two New Worlds, London, New York, Bombay, Calcutta: Longmans, Green, and Co., 1907.
- New Light on Immortality, London, New York: Longmans, Green, and Co., 1908.
- Wonders of Physical Science, London: Macmillan and Co., 1910.
- Contemporary Chemistry: A Survey of the Present State, Methods and Tendencies of Chemical Science, New York, D. Van Nostrand Co., 1911.
- The Goligher Circle, May to August 1921, London: John M. Watkins, 1922.
- The Life of Sir William Crookes, O.M., F.R.S., London: T. F. Unwin, 1923.
- The Moon-Element; An Introduction to the Wonders of Selenium, London: T. F. Unwin, 1924.
- Hephæstus; or, The soul of the Machine, New York, E.P. Dutton & Co, 1925.
- Quo vadimus? Some Glimpses of the Future, New York, E.P. Dutton & Company, 1925.

== Works translated by him ==
- Across the Sahara by Motorcar. G. M. Haardt and L. Audouin-Dubreuil; T. F. Unwin, 1924. Translated by E. E. Fournier d'Albe.
- The Heavens. Jean-Henri Fabre; J. B. Lippincott Company, 1924. Translated by E. E. Fournier d'Albe.
- Phenomena of Materialisation. Albert von Schrenck-Notzing; Kegan Paul & Company, 1920. Translated by E. E. Fournier d'Albe.
- Dreams of an Astronomer. Camille Flammarion; New York: Appleton, 1923. Translated from Rêves étoilés by E. E. Fournier d'Albe.
