= Celtic nations =

Territories in Northwestern Europe in which Celtic cultural traits have survived

The six Celtic nations Brittany Cornwall Ireland Isle of Man Scotland Wales

The Celtic nations or Celtic countries are a group of geographical regions in Northwestern Europe where the Celtic languages and cultural traits have survived.

The six regions widely considered Celtic countries in modern times are Brittany (Breizh), Cornwall (Kernow), Ireland (Éire), the Isle of Man (Mannin or Ellan Vannin), Scotland (Alba), and Wales (Cymru). In each of these six regions a Celtic language is spoken to some extent: Brittonic or Brythonic languages are spoken in Brittany (Breton), Cornwall (Cornish), and Wales (Welsh), whilst Goidelic or Gaelic languages are spoken in Scotland (Scottish Gaelic), Ireland (Irish), and the Isle of Man (Manx). Galicia is also often considered a Celtic country.

Before the expansion of ancient Rome and the spread of Germanic and Slavic tribes, much of Europe was dominated by Celtic-speaking cultures, leaving behind a legacy of Celtic cultural traits. Certain regions with evidence of Celtic influence in northwestern Iberia, such as Asturias, northern Portugal, León, and Cantabria (historically known as Gallaecia and Astures), are not typically considered Celtic nations. Unlike with the Insular Celtic languages, there is no record of Celtic languages surviving into the modern era within these regions. Similar evidence of a pattern of Celtic influence without the long-term survival of Celtic languages is also found in various regions across Europe, including parts of Italy, Austria, and the Czech Republic.

The concept of the Celtic nations is widely promoted by pan-Celtic movements, including political and cultural organizations like the Celtic League or International Celtic Congress.

== Six recognised nations ==
The six Celtic nations shown within Europe

Each of the six nations has its own Celtic language. In Brittany, Ireland, Scotland, and Wales these have been spoken continuously through time, while Cornwall and the Isle of Man have languages that were spoken into modern times but later died as spoken community languages. In the latter two regions, however, language revitalisation movements have led to the adoption of these languages by adults and produced a number of native speakers.

Ireland, Wales, Brittany, and Scotland contain areas where a Celtic language is used on a daily basis; in Ireland these areas are called the Gaeltacht; in Wales Y Fro Gymraeg, Breizh-Izel (Lower Brittany) in western Brittany. Generally these communities are in the west of their countries and in more isolated upland or island areas. Welsh is much more widespread, with many people in the north and west speaking it as a first language, or equally alongside English. Public signage is in dual languages throughout Wales and it is now a requirement to possess at least basic Welsh in order to be employed by the Welsh government. The term Gàidhealtachd historically distinguished the Gaelic-speaking areas of Scotland (the Highlands and islands) from the Lowland Scots (i.e. Anglo-Saxon-speaking) areas. This term has also been adopted as the Gaelic name of the Highland council area, which includes non-Gaelic speaking areas.

In Wales, the Welsh language is a core curriculum (compulsory) subject, which all pupils study. Additionally, 20% of schoolchildren in Wales attend Welsh medium schools, where they are taught entirely in the Welsh language. In the Republic of Ireland, all school children study Irish as one of the three core subjects until the end of secondary school, and 7.4% of primary school education is through Irish medium education, which is part of the Gaelscoil movement.

=== Other regions ===
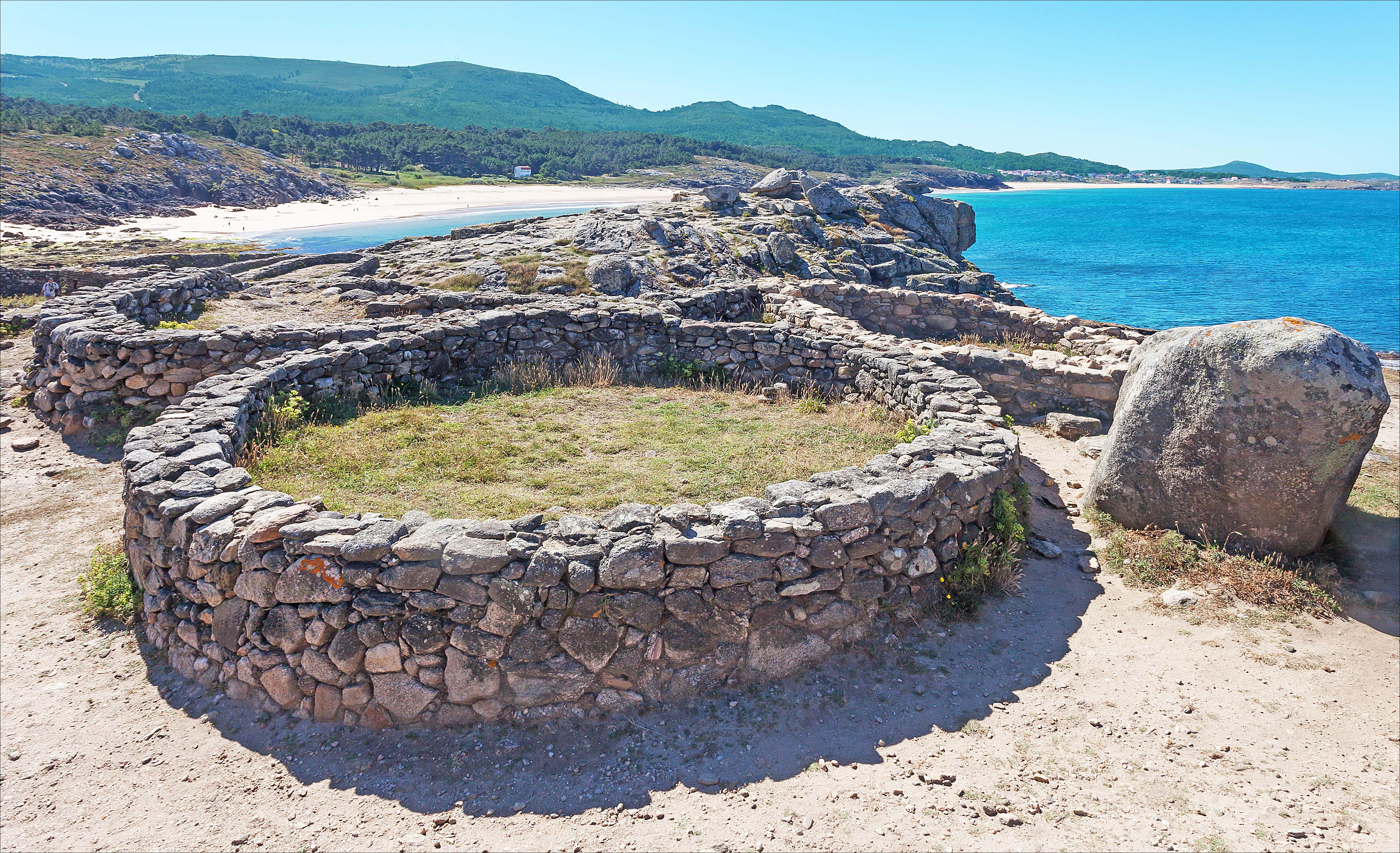
Castro de Baroña, a Celtic hill fort in Galicia, northwest Spain.

Parts of the northern Iberian Peninsula, namely Galicia, Cantabria, Asturias in Spain, and the North Region, Portugal, also lay claim to a Celtic heritage. These regions are not traditionally included among the six primary "Celtic nations" owing to the absence of a living Celtic language, but archaeological and historical evidence points to a significant Celtic influence, particularly in the ancient region of Gallaecia, which encompassed modern Galicia and northern Portugal.

==== Historical and archaeological influence ====
Numerous archaeological findings, such as castros (hill forts) and artifacts bearing Celtic motifs, support the presence of Celtic-speaking cultures in Gallaecia dating back to at least the Iron Age. Classical sources, including Strabo and Pomponius Mela, described the Gallaeci and Astures tribes as Celtic, noting similarities in cultural practices and languages with the broader Celtic world.

==== Toponymy and linguistic substrates ====
While no Celtic language has been spoken in northern Iberia since the early Middle Ages, traces of a Celtic linguistic substratum persist in local place names and vocabulary. Toponyms with Celtic roots, such as those ending in "-briga" (meaning "fortress" or "hill"), are common in Galicia and northern Portugal.

==== Cultural revitalization of Celtic heritage ====
In recent decades, there has been a revival of interest in Celtic heritage across Galicia, Asturias, and northern Portugal. These regions actively participate in pan-Celtic events such as the Festival Interceltique de Lorient, where Galicia and Asturias are recognized alongside the six core Celtic nations. The annual Ortigueira's Festival of Celtic World in Galicia, one of Europe's largest celebrations of Celtic music and culture, attracts performers and audiences from across the Celtic world.

Irish was once widely spoken on the island of Newfoundland, but largely disappeared by the early 20th century. Vestiges remain in words found in Newfoundland English, such as scrob for "scratch" and sleeveen for "rascal." There are virtually no known fluent speakers of Irish Gaelic in Newfoundland or Labrador today, though memorized passages survive in traditional tales and songs.

Canadian Gaelic dialects of Scottish Gaelic are still spoken by Gaels in parts of Atlantic Canada, primarily on Cape Breton Island and nearby areas of Nova Scotia. In 2011, there were 1,275 Gaelic speakers in Nova Scotia, and 300 residents of the province considered a Gaelic language their "mother tongue."

Patagonian Welsh is spoken principally in Y Wladfa in the Chubut Province of Patagonia, with sporadic speakers elsewhere in Argentina. Estimates of the number of Welsh speakers range from 1,500 to 5,000.

== Celtic languages ==
The Celtic languages form a branch of the greater Indo-European language family. SIL Ethnologue lists six living Celtic languages, of which four have retained a substantial number of native speakers. These are the Goidelic languages (Irish, Scottish Gaelic, and Manx, which are both descended from Middle Irish) and the Brittonic languages (Welsh, Breton and Cornish, which are both descended from Common Brittonic).

In 2010, there were more than 1.4 million speakers of Celtic languages.

== Celtic identity ==
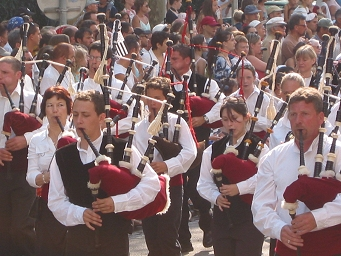
Pipers at the Festival Interceltique de Lorient

Formal cooperation between the Celtic nations is active in many contexts, including politics, languages, culture and music.

The Celtic League is an inter-Celtic political organisation, which campaigns for the political, language, cultural and social rights, affecting one or more of the Celtic nations.

Established in 1917, the Celtic Congress is a non-political organisation that seeks to promote Celtic culture and languages and to maintain intellectual contact and close cooperation between Celtic peoples.

Festivals celebrating the culture of the Celtic nations include the Festival Interceltique de Lorient (Brittany), Ortigueira's Festival of Celtic World (Galicia), the Pan Celtic Festival (Ireland), CeltFest Cuba (Havana, Cuba), the National Celtic Festival (Portarlington, Australia), the Celtic Media Festival (showcasing film and television from the Celtic nations), and the Eisteddfod (Wales).

Inter-Celtic music festivals include Celtic Connections (Glasgow), and the Hebridean Celtic Festival (Stornoway). Due to immigration, a dialect of Scottish Gaelic (Canadian Gaelic) is spoken by some on Cape Breton Island in Nova Scotia, while a Welsh-speaking minority exists in the Chubut Province of Argentina. Hence, for certain purposes—such as the Festival Interceltique de Lorient—Gallaecia, Asturias, and Cape Breton Island in Nova Scotia are considered three of the nine Celtic nations.

Sporting competitions involving teams from Ireland, Scotland and Wales have been held in rugby union (Pro14—formerly known as the Celtic League), athletics (Celtic Cup) and association football (the Nations Cup—also known as the Celtic Cup).

The Republic of Ireland enjoyed a period of rapid economic growth between 1995 and 2007, leading to the use of the phrase Celtic Tiger to describe the country. Aspirations for Scotland to achieve a similar economic performance to that of Ireland led the Scotland First Minister Alex Salmond to set out his vision of a Celtic Lion economy for Scotland, in 2007.

=== Genetic studies ===
A Y-DNA study by an Oxford University research team in 2006 claimed that the majority of Britons, including many of the English, are descended from a group of tribes which arrived from Iberia around 5000 BC, before the spread of Celtic culture into western Europe. However, three major later genetic studies have largely invalidated these claims, instead showing that haplogroup R1b in western Europe, most common in traditionally Celtic-speaking areas of Atlantic Europe like Ireland and Brittany, would have largely expanded in massive migrations from the Indo-European homeland, the Yamnaya culture in the Pontic–Caspian steppe, during the Bronze Age along with carriers of Indo-European languages like proto-Celtic. Unlike previous studies, large sections of autosomal DNA were analyzed in addition to paternal Y-DNA markers. They detected an autosomal component present in modern Europeans which was not present in Neolithic or Mesolithic Europeans, and which would have been introduced into Europe with paternal lineages R1b and R1a, as well as the Indo-European languages. This genetic component, labelled as "Yamnaya" in the studies, then mixed to varying degrees with earlier Mesolithic hunter-gatherer or Neolithic farmer populations already existing in western Europe. Furthermore, a 2016 study also found that Bronze Age remains from Rathlin Island in Ireland dating to over 4,000 years ago were most genetically similar to modern Irish, Scottish and Welsh, and that the core of the genome of insular Celtic populations was established by this time.

In 2015 a genetic study of the United Kingdom showed that there is no unified 'Celtic' genetic identity compared to 'non-Celtic' areas. The 'Celtic' areas of the United Kingdom (Scotland, Northern Ireland, Wales and Cornwall) show the most genetic differences among each other. The data shows that Scottish and Cornish populations share greater genetic similarity with the English than they do with other 'Celtic' populations, with the Cornish in particular being genetically much closer to other English groups than they are to the Welsh or the Scots.

The Irish appear to be the least affected by others out of the Celtic nations, most notably the Anglo-Saxons, this is reflected in them having the highest concentration of the "Insular Celtic" haplogroup R1b-L21 in the world.

== Terminology ==
The term Celtic nations derives from the linguistics studies of the 16th century scholar George Buchanan and the polymath Edward Lhuyd. As Assistant Keeper and then Keeper of the Ashmolean Museum, Oxford (1691–1709), Lhuyd travelled extensively in Great Britain, Ireland and Brittany in the late 17th and early 18th centuries. Noting the similarity between the languages of Brittany, Cornwall and Wales, which he called "P-Celtic" or Brythonic, the languages of Ireland, the Isle of Man and Scotland, which he called "Q-Celtic" or Goidelic, and between the two groups, Lhuyd published Archaeologia Britannica: an Account of the Languages, Histories and Customs of Great Britain, from Travels through Wales, Cornwall, Bas-Bretagne, Ireland and Scotland in 1707. His Archaeologia Britannica concluded that all six languages derived from the same root. Lhuyd theorised that the root language descended from the languages spoken by the Iron Age tribes of Gaul, whom Greek and Roman writers called Celtic. Having defined the languages of those areas as Celtic, the people living in them and speaking those languages became known as Celtic too. There is some dispute as to whether Lhuyd's theory is correct. Nevertheless, the term Celtic to describe the languages and peoples of Brittany, Cornwall and Wales, Ireland, the Isle of Man and Scotland was accepted from the 18th century and is widely used today.

These areas of Europe are sometimes referred to as the "Celt belt" or "Celtic fringe" because of their location generally on the western edges of the continent, and of the states they inhabit (e.g. Brittany is in the northwest of France, Cornwall is in the south west of Great Britain, Wales in western Great Britain and the Gaelic-speaking parts of Ireland and Scotland are in the west of those countries). Additionally, this region is known as the "Celtic Crescent" because of the near crescent shaped position of the nations in Europe.

=== Endonyms and Celtic exonyms ===
The Celtic names for each nation in each language illustrate some of the similarity between the languages. Despite differences in orthography, there are many sound and lexical correspondences between the endonyms and exonyms used to refer to the Celtic nations.

English	Breton (Brezhoneg)	Welsh (Cymraeg)	Cornish (Kernowek)	Irish (Gaeilge)	Scottish Gaelic (Gàidhlig)	Manx (Gaelg)
Brittany	Breizh [bʁɛjs, bʁɛχ]	Llydaw [ˈɬədau]	Breten Vian	an Bhriotáin [ənˠ ˈvʲɾʲit̪ˠaːnʲ]	a' Bhreatainn Bheag [ə ˈvɾʲɛht̪əɲ ˈvek]	yn Vritaan
Cornwall	Kernev-Veur [ˈkɛʁnev ˈvøːr]	Cernyw [ˈkɛrnɨu]	Kernow	Corn na Breataine [ˈkoːɾˠn̪ˠ n̪ˠə ˈbʲɾʲat̪ˠənʲə]	a' Chòrn [ə ˈxoːrˠn̪ˠ]	yn Chorn
Ireland	Iwerzhon [iˈwɛʁzɔ̃n]	Iwerddon [iˈwɛrðɔn]	Wordhen; Iwerdhon	Éire [ˈeːɾʲə]	Èirinn [ˈeːɾʲɪɲ]	Nerin
Mann; Isle of Man	Manav [mɑ̃ˈnaw] Enez-Vanav [ˈẽːnes vɑ̃ˈnaw]	Manaw [ˈmanau] Ynys Manaw [ˈənɨs ˈmanau]	Manow; Enys Vanow	Manainn [ˈmˠanˠən̠ʲ] Oileán Mhanann [ˈɛlʲaːn̪ˠ ˈwanˠən̪ˠ]	Manainn [ˈmanɪɲ] Eilean Mhanainn [ˈelan ˈvanɪɲ]	Mannin [ˈmanʲɪn] Ellan Vannin [ˈɛlʲan ˈvanɪnʲ]
Scotland	Bro-Skos [bʁo ˈskos] Skos [skos]	yr Alban [ər ˈalban]	Alban	Albain [ˈalˠəbˠənʲ]	Alba [ˈal̪ˠapə]	Nalbin [ˈnalbənʲ]
Wales	Kembre [ˈkɛ̃mbʁe]	Cymru [ˈkəmrɨ]	Kembra	an Bhreatain Bheag [ənˠ ˈvʲɾʲat̪ˠənʲ ˈvʲaɡ]	a' Chuimrigh [ə ˈxɯmɯɾɪ]	Bretin
Celtic nations	broioù keltiek [ˈbʁoju ˈkɛltjɛk]	gwledydd Celtaidd [ɡʊˈlɛið ˈkɛltaið]	broyow keltek	náisiúin Cheilteacha [ˈn̪ˠaːʃuːnʲ ˈçɛlʲtʲəxə]	nàiseanan Ceilteach [ˈn̪ˠaːʃanən ˈkʲʰeltʲəx]	ashoonyn Celtiagh
Celtic languages	yezhoù keltiek [ˈjeːsu ˈkɛltjɛk]	ieithoedd Celtaidd [ˈjɛiθɔɨð ˈkɛltaið]	yethow keltek	teangacha Ceilteacha [ˈtʲaŋɡəxə ˈcɛlʲtʲəxə]	cànanain Cheilteach [ˈkʰaːnanɪɲ ˈçeltʲəx]	çhengaghyn Celtiagh
Great Britain	Breizh-Veur [ˈbʁɛjs ˈvøːʁ]	Prydain Fawr [ˈpr̥ədaɨn ˈvaur]	Breten Veur	an Bhreatain Mhór [ənˠ ˈvʲɾʲat̪ˠənʲ ˈwoːɾˠ]	Breatainn Mhòr [ə ˈvɾʲɛht̪əɲ ˈvoːɾ]	Bretin Vooar

== Territories of the ancient Celts ==
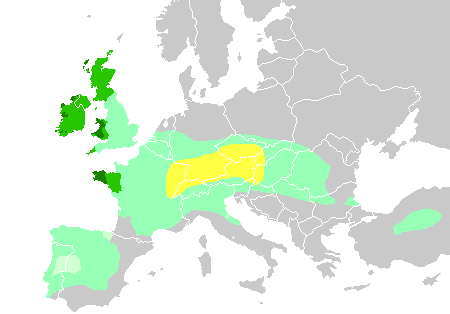
Diachronic distribution of Celtic peoples: core Hallstatt territory, by the 6th century BC maximal Celtic expansion, by 275 BC Lusitanian area of Iberia where Celtic presence is uncertain the six Celtic nations which retained significant numbers of Celtic speakers into the Early modern period areas where Celtic languages remain widely spoken today

=== Iberian Peninsula ===
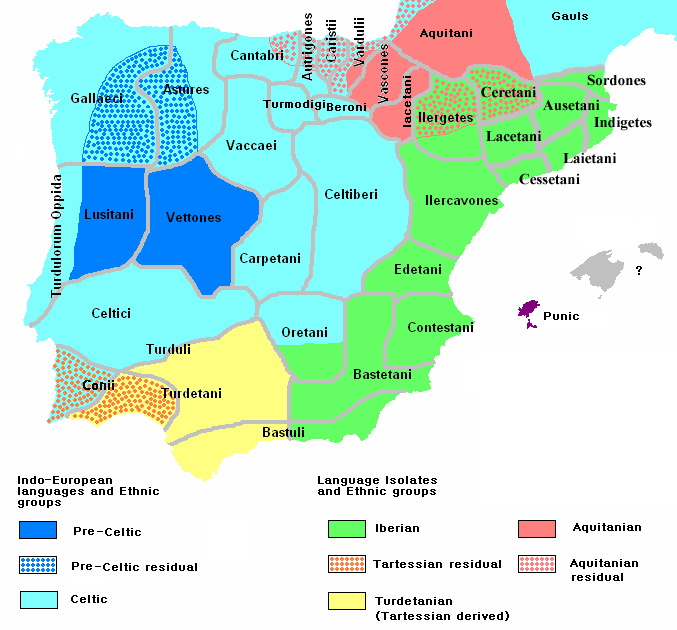
Iberian Peninsula at about 200 BC.

Modern-day Galicians, Asturians, Cantabrians and northern Portuguese claim a Celtic heritage or identity. Despite the extinction of Iberian Celtic languages in Roman times, Celtic heritage is attested in toponymics and language substratum, ancient texts, folklore and music.

=== Formerly Gaulish regions ===
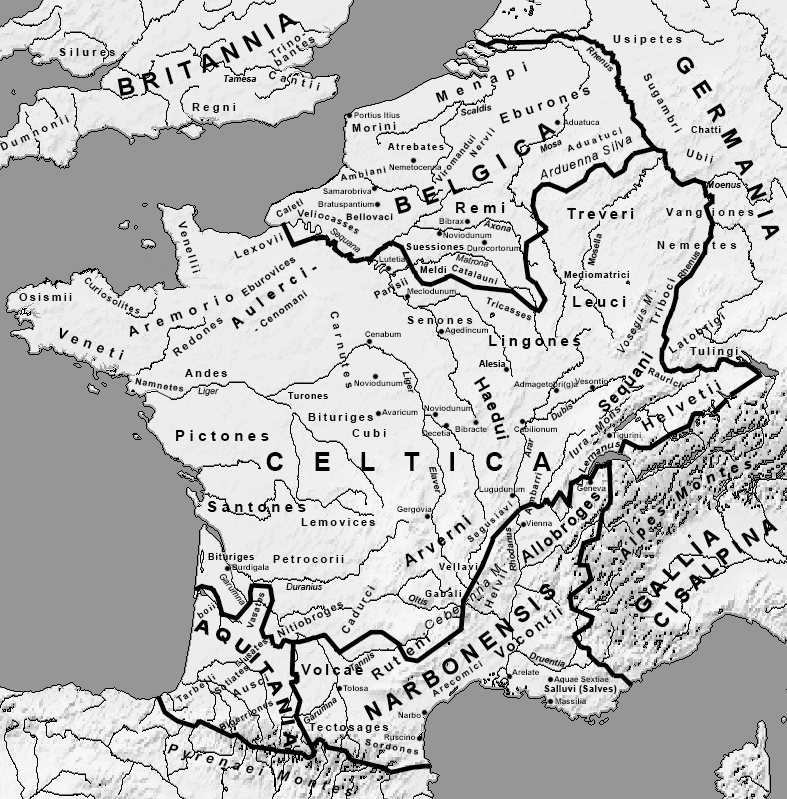
Repartition of Gaul c. 54 BC

Most French people identify with the ancient Gauls and are well aware that they were a people that spoke Celtic languages and lived Celtic ways of life.

Walloons occasionally characterise themselves as "Celts", mainly in opposition to the "Teutonic" Flemish and "Latin" French identities. Others think they are Belgian, that is to say Germano-Celtic people different from the Gaulish-Celtic French.

=== Italian Peninsula ===
The Canegrate culture (13th century BC) may represent the first migratory wave of the proto-Celtic population from the northwest part of the Alps that, through the Alpine passes, had already penetrated and settled in the western Po valley between Lake Maggiore and Lake Como (Scamozzina culture). It has also been proposed that a more ancient proto-Celtic presence can be traced back to the beginning of the Middle Bronze Age (16th–15th century BC), when North Western Italy appears closely linked regarding the production of bronze artifacts, including ornaments, to the western groups of the Tumulus culture (Central Europe, 1600–1200 BC). La Tène cultural material appeared over a large area of mainland Italy, the southernmost example being the Celtic helmet from Canosa di Puglia.

Italy is home to Lepontic, the oldest attested Celtic language (from the 6th century BC). Anciently spoken in Switzerland and in Northern-Central Italy, from the Alps to Umbria. According to the Recueil des Inscriptions Gauloises, more than 760 Gaulish inscriptions have been found throughout present-day France—with the notable exception of Aquitaine—and in Italy.

The French- and Arpitan-speaking Aosta Valley region in Italy also presents a claim of Celtic heritage. The Northern League autonomist party often exalts what it claims are the Celtic roots of all Northern Italy or Padania.

=== Central and Eastern European regions ===
Celtic tribes inhabited land in what is now southern Germany and Austria. Many scholars have associated the earliest Celtic peoples with the Hallstatt culture. The Boii, the Scordisci, and the Vindelici are some of the tribes that inhabited Central Europe, including what is now Slovakia, Serbia, Croatia, Poland and the Czech Republic as well as Germany and Austria. The Boii gave their name to Bohemia. The Boii founded a city on the site of modern Prague, and some of its ruins are now a tourist attraction. There are claims among modern Czechs that the Czech people are as much descendants of the Boii as they are from the later Slavic invaders (as well as the historical Germanic peoples of Czech lands). This claim may not only be political: according to a 2000 study by Semino, 35.6% of Czech males have y-chromosome haplogroup R1b, which is common among Celts but rare among Slavs.

== See also ==
- Anglo-Celtic
- Breton nationalism
- Celt
- Celtic Christianity
- Celtic Revival
- Celtic art
- Celtic fusion
- Celtic mythology
- Celtic union
- Galician nationalism
- Germanic languages
- Irish nationalism
- Pan-Celticism
- Norse-Gaelic
- Romance-speaking Europe
- Scottish national identity
- Slavic Europe
- Welsh nationalism

== Bibliography ==
- Koch, John (2006). Celtic Culture: A Historical Encyclopedia. ABL-CIO. p. 2128. ISBN 978-1-85109-440-0.
