= Charles de Gaulle (poet) =

French poet (1837–1880)

- Charlez Vro-C'hall
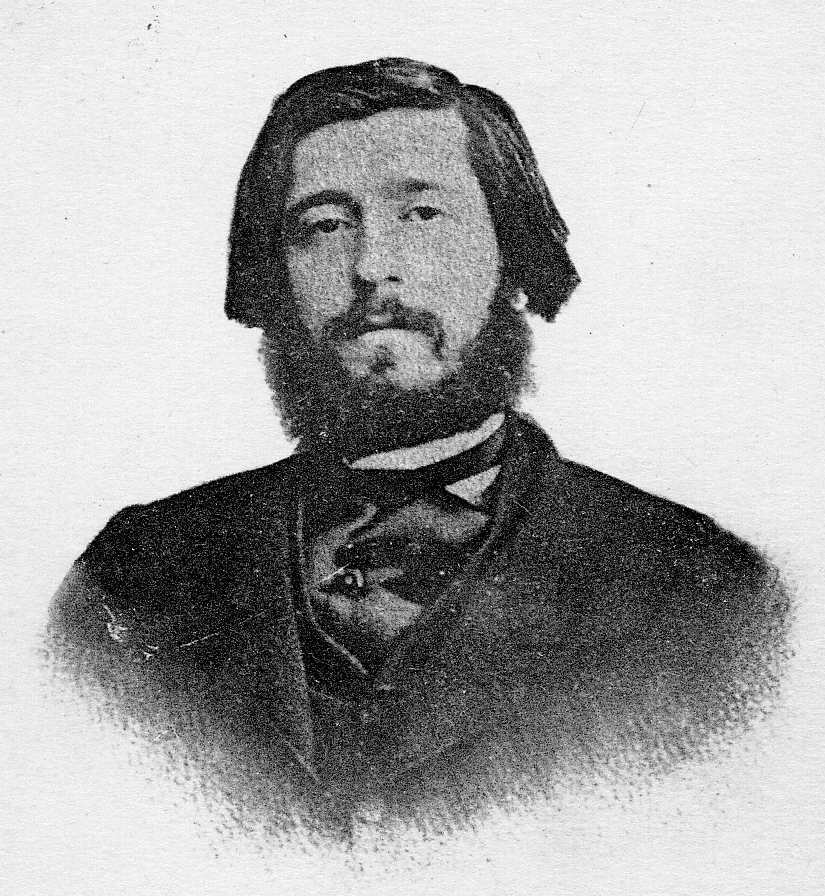
- A postcard depicting Charles de Gaulle
- Born: 31 January 1837; Valenciennes, France
- Died: 1 January 1880 (aged 42); Paris, France
- Occupation: Poet
- Relatives: General Charles de Gaulle
- Writing career
- Language: Breton
- Literary movement: Pan-Celticism

Charles Jules-Joseph de Gaulle ([ʃaʁl(ə) də ɡol]; 31 January 1837 – 1 January 1880) was a French writer who was a pioneer of Pan-Celticism and the bardic revival. He is also known as Charlez Vro-C'hall, the Breton language version of his name.

He was the uncle of the army officer and President of France Charles de Gaulle (1890–1970), though he died ten years before the President's birth.

== Life ==
Born in Valenciennes, Nord, de Gaulle was struck by a progressive paralyzing illness from his early youth. He turned to scholarship and began a study of the Celtic languages after reading Barzaz Breiz (Ballads of Brittany) at the age of sixteen. He learned Breton, Welsh and Gaelic, but never visited a Celtic-speaking country, being confined to his apartment in Paris. Having met Théodore Hersart de la Villemarqué, author of Barzaz Breiz, he became secretary of Breuriez Breiz, a society of Breton poets in Paris. From 1864 he started to publish articles on Celtic culture, especially Brittany, and poetry in the Breton language.

However, as his disease progressed, his publications became increasingly scarce. His literary activity gradually ceased, but he retained until the end his lucidity of mind and was able to follow the progress of his favourite studies. He died at the age of 42.

== Pan-Celticism ==
De Gaulle was an early pan-Celticist with De Barra (2018) writing "the story of Pan-Celticism begins with....Charles de Gaulle"

De Gaulle dreamed of the resurrection of the Celtic languages as vehicles for high culture. A devout Catholic and monarchist, de Gaulle saw Celtic countries as guardians of tradition and proposed a restoration of Breton political autonomy, providing a model for later Breton nationalists. In 1864 he wrote an appeal to the current representatives of the "Celtic race", proposing Celtic festivals:

If I am allowed to express a wish - as yet most ambitious, doubtless difficult to accomplish - it would be to see a new religious order, or at least, a special division of a former religious order, to devote, under the invocation of old saints, wise men from both Britains [The British Isles and Brittany] to preaching and instruction of youth of all classes in the Celtic countries, and this mainly through indigenous languages...After the celebration of holy sacrifice, in open fields, on an old dolmen, surrounded by the people of neighbouring parishes, the solemnities open with a contest of popular bards... Shooting, wrestling, horse and foot races, regattas at the seaside, would provide a new and useful means of improving our agile and robust youth.

De Gaulle insisted that Celtic countries must retain their languages to avoid cultural extinction, asserting that "so long as a conquered people speaks another language than the conquerors, the best part of them is still free". He also proposed a Celtic Union that would establish and develop links between Celtic countries. There should also be a Celtic "Esperanto" to facilitate communication and which would be created from common elements in all Celtic languages and a Pan-Celtic festival.

De Gaulle wrote to cultural leaders in Wales, Scotland and Ireland to organise a Pan-Celtic congress in Saint-Brieuc, Brittany in 1867, which he succeeded in pushing through despite opposition from the French government. Unable to travel due to health issues, he wrote the poem Da Varsez Breiz (To the Bards of Brittany) in Breton, including the lines:

E Paris va c'horf zo dalc'het
Med davedoc'h e nij va spered
’Vel ul lapous, a-denn askell,
’Nij de gavout e vreudeur a-belll

(In Paris my body is held
But towards you my spirit flies,
Swiftly like a bird,
To meet his far away brothers.)

== 1969 speech ==
In January 1969, President Charles de Gaulle attempted to use his uncle's reputation in Brittany by reciting the second quatrain of his poem Da Varsez Breiz during a speech given in Quimper, Finistère. The speech was made in the wake of a series of crackdowns on Breton nationalists by the government of France. De Gaulle's use of the poem was met with a hostile reaction from the audience, whose noise drowned out much of the rest of his speech. He was later accused of double standards, having recently spoken in favour of a "free" Quebec, because its French heritage distinguished it from the rest of Canada, which was dominated by English Canadians.
