= Pan-Celticism =

Political, social, and cultural movement in Northwestern Europe

A Pan-Celtic Flag of two interlaced Triskelion, designed by Breton Robert Berthelier in 1950.

Pan-Celticism (Irish: Pan-Cheilteachas, Scottish Gaelic: Pan-Cheilteachas, Breton: Pan-Keltaidd, Welsh: Pan-Geltaidd, Cornish: Pan-Keltaidh, Manx: Pan-Cheltaghys), also known as Celticism or Celtic nationalism, is a political, social and cultural movement advocating solidarity and cooperation between Celtic nations (both the Brythonic and Gaelic branches) and the modern Celts in Northwestern Europe. Some pan-Celtic organisations advocate the Celtic nations seceding from the United Kingdom and France and forming their own separate federal state together, while others simply advocate very close cooperation between independent sovereign Celtic nations, in the form of Breton, Cornish, Irish, Manx, Scottish, and Welsh nationalism.

Just like other pan-nationalist movements, the pan-Celtic movement grew out of Romantic nationalism and specific to itself, the Celtic Revival. The pan-Celtic movement was most prominent during the 19th and 20th centuries (roughly 1838 until 1939). Some early pan-Celtic contacts took place through the Gorsedd and the Eisteddfod, while the annual Celtic Congress was initiated in 1900. Since that time the Celtic League has become the prominent face of political pan-Celticism. Initiatives largely focused on cultural Celtic cooperation, rather than explicitly politics, such as music, arts and literature festivals, are usually referred to instead as inter-Celtic.

== Terminology ==
There is some controversy surrounding the term Celts. One such example was the Celtic League's Galician crisis. This was a debate over whether the Spanish region of Galicia should be admitted. The application was rejected on the basis of a lack of a presence of a Celtic language.

Some Austrians claim that they have a Celtic heritage that became Romanized under Roman rule and later Germanized after Germanic invasions. Austria is the location of the first characteristically Celtic culture to exist. After the annexation of Austria by Nazi Germany in 1938, in October 1940 a writer from the Irish Press interviewed Austrian physicist Erwin Schrödinger who spoke of Celtic heritage of Austrians, saying "I believe there is a deeper connection between us Austrians and the Celts. Names of places in the Austrian Alps are said to be of Celtic origin." Contemporary Austrians express pride in having Celtic heritage and Austria possesses one of the largest collections of Celtic artefacts in Europe.

Organisations such as the Celtic Congress and the Celtic League use the definition that a 'Celtic nation' is a nation with recent history of a traditional Celtic language.

== History ==
=== Modern conception of the Celtic peoples ===
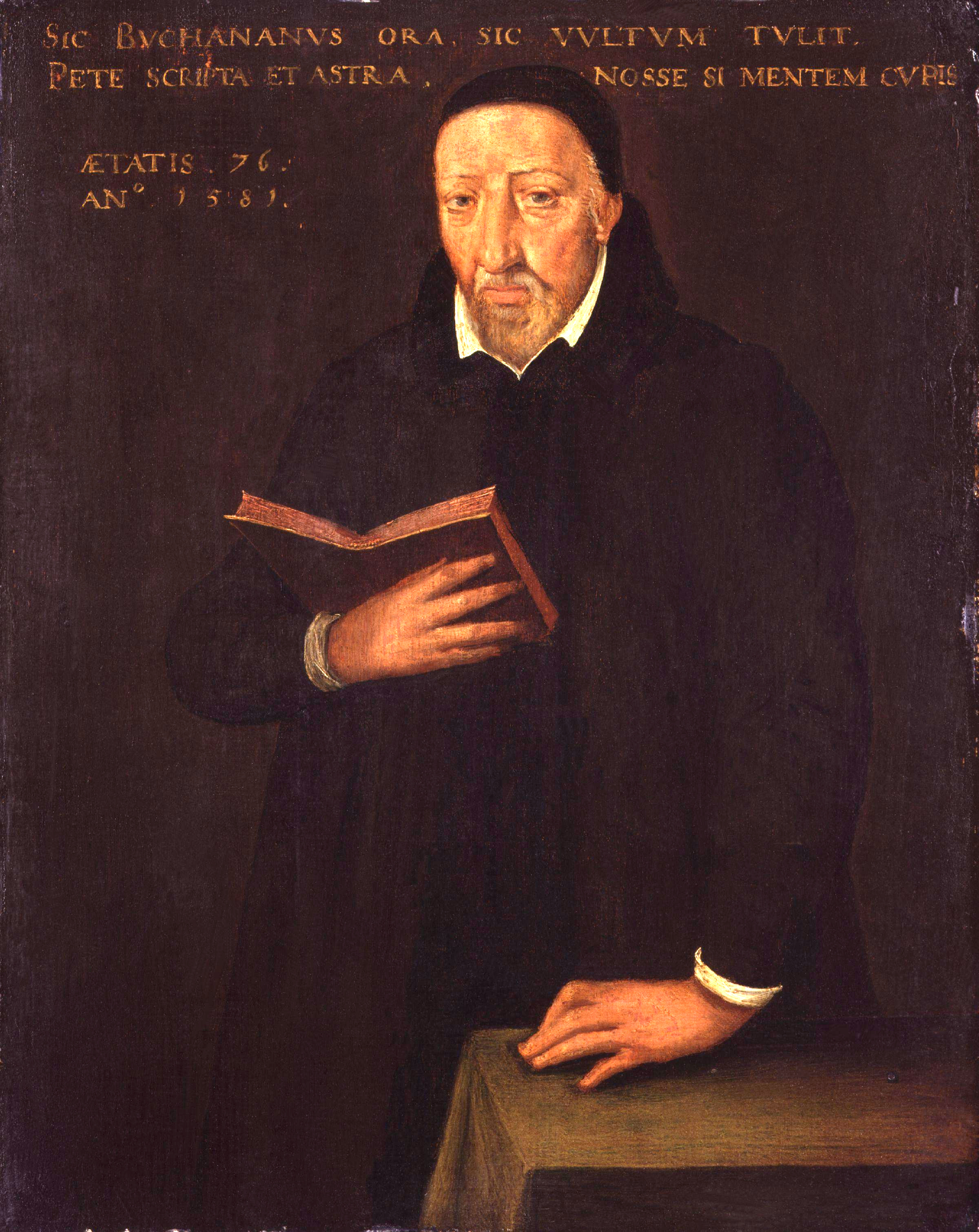
George Buchanan was one of the first modern historians to note the connection between Celtic peoples.

Before the Roman Empire and the rise of Christianity, people lived in Iron Age Britain and Ireland, speaking languages from which the modern Gaelic languages (including Irish, Scottish Gaelic and Manx) and Brythonic languages (including Welsh, Breton and Cornish) descend. These people, along with others in Continental Europe who once spoke now extinct languages from the same Indo-European branch (such as the Gauls, Celtiberians and Galatians), have been retroactively referred to in a collective sense as the Celts, particularly in a wide spread manner since the turn of the 18th century. Variations of the term "Celt", such as Keltoi, had been used in antiquity by the Greeks and the Romans to refer to some groups of these people, such as Herodotus' use of it in regards to the Gauls.

The modern usage of "Celt" in reference to these cultures grew up gradually. A pioneer in the field was George Buchanan, a 16th-century Scottish scholar, Renaissance humanist and tutor to king James IV of Scotland. From a Scottish Gaelic-speaking family, Buchanan in his Rerum Scoticarum Historia (1582), went over the writings of Tacitus who had discussed the similarity between the language of the Gauls and the ancient Britons. Buchanan concluded, if the Gauls were Celtae, as they were described as in Roman sources, then the Britons were Celtae too. He began to see a pattern in place names and concluded that the Britons and Irish Gaels once spoke one Celtic language which later diverged. It wouldn't be until over a century later when these ideas were widely popularised; first by the Breton scholar Paul-Yves Pezron in his Antiquité de la Nation et de la langue celtes autrement appelez Gaulois (1703) and then by the Welsh scholar Edward Lhuyd in his Archaeologia Britannica: An Account of the Languages, Histories and Customs of the Original Inhabitants of Great Britain (1707).

By the time the modern concept of the Celts as a people had emerged, their fortunes had declined substantially, taken over by Germanic people. Firstly, the Celtic Britons of sub-Roman Britain were swamped by a tide of Anglo-Saxon settlement from the fifth century on and lost most of their territory to them. They were subsequently referred to as the Welsh people and the Cornish people. A group of these fled Britain altogether and settled in Continental Europe in Armorica, becoming the Breton people. The Gaels for a while actually expanded, pushing out of Ireland to conquer Pictland in Britain, establishing Alba by the ninth century. From the 11th century onward, the arrival of the Normans, caused problems not only for the English but also for the Celts. The Normans invaded the Welsh kingdoms (establishing the Principality of Wales), the Irish kingdoms (establishing the Lordship of Ireland) and took control of the Scottish monarchy through intermarrying. This advance was often done in conjunction with the Catholic Church's Gregorian Reform, which was centralising the religion in Europe.

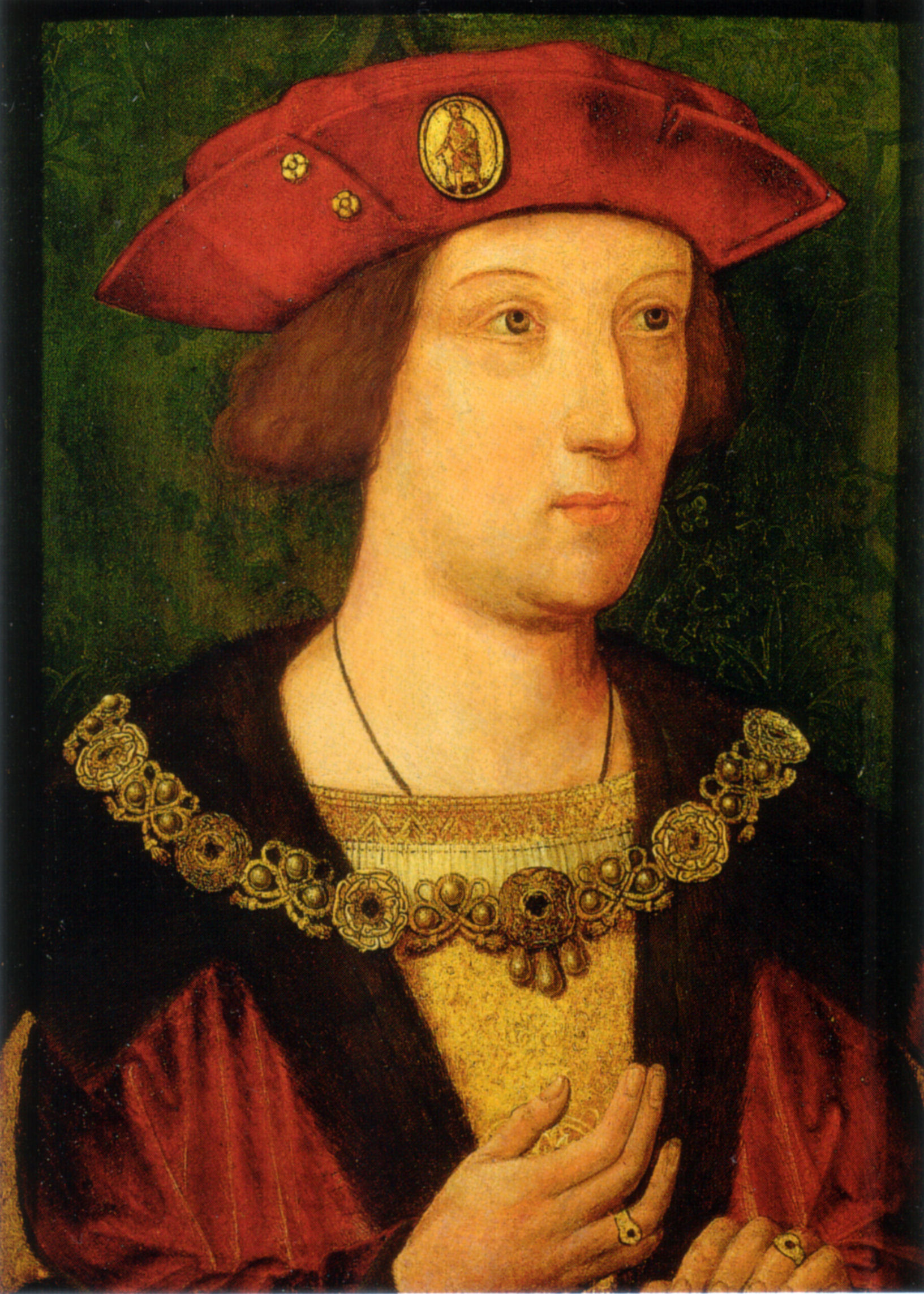
Arthur, Prince of Wales. The Tudors played up their Celtic background, while accelerating Anglicisation.

The dawning of early modern Europe affected the Celtic peoples in ways which saw what small amount of independence they had left firmly subordinated to the emerging British Empire and in the case of the Duchy of Brittany, the Kingdom of France. Although both the Kings of England (the Tudors) and the Kings of Scotland (the Stewarts) of the day claimed Celtic ancestry and used this in Arthurian cultural motifs to lay the basis for a British monarchy ("British" being suggested by Elizabethan John Dee), both dynasties promoted a centralising policy of Anglicisation. The Gaels of Ireland lost their last kingdoms to the Kingdom of Ireland after the Flight of the Earls in 1607, while the Statutes of Iona attempted to de-Gaelicise the Highland Scots in 1609. The effects of these initiates were mixed, but took from the Gaels their natural leadership element, which had patronised their culture.

Under Anglocentric British rule, the Celtic-speaking peoples were reduced to a marginalised, largely poor people, small farmers and fishermen, clinging to the coast of the North Atlantic. Following the Industrial Revolution in the 18th century, greater multitudes were Anglicised and fled into a diaspora around the British Empire as an industrial proletariat. Further de-Gaelicisation took place for the Irish during the Great Hunger and the Highland Scots during the Highland Clearances. Similarly for the Bretons, after the French Revolution, the Jacobins demanded greater centralisation, against regional identities and for Francization, enacted by the French Directory in 1794. However, Napoleon Bonaparte was greatly attracted to the romantic image of the Celt, which was partly based on Jean-Jacques Rousseau's glorification of the noble savage and the popularity of James Macpherson's Ossianic tales throughout Europe. Bonaparte's nephew, Napoleon III, would later have the Vercingétorix monument erected to honour the Celtic Gaulish leader. Indeed, in France the phrase "nos ancêtres les Gaulois" (our ancestors the Gauls) was invoked by Romantic nationalists, typically in a republican fashion, to refer to the majority of the people, contrary to the aristocracy (claimed to be of Frankish-Germanic descent).

=== Dawning of Pan-Celticism as a political idea ===
Following the dying down of Jacobitism as a political threat in Britain and Ireland, with the firm establishment of Hanoverian Britain under the liberal, rationalist philosophy of the Enlightenment, a backlash of Romanticism in the late 18th century occurred and "the Celt" was rehabilitated in literature, in a movement which is sometimes known as "Celtomania." The most prominent native representatives of the initial stages of this Celtic Revival were James Macpherson, author of the Poems of Ossian (1761) and Iolo Morganwg, founder of the Gorsedd. The imagery of the "Celtic World" also inspired English and Lowland Scots poets such as Blake, Wordsworth, Byron, Shelley and Scott. In particular the Druids inspired fascination for outsiders, as English and French antiquarians, such as William Stukeley, John Aubrey, Théophile Corret de la Tour d'Auvergne and Jacques Cambry, began to associate ancient megaliths and dolmens with the Druids. (Note: The current of neo-Druidism, deriving from the writings of the likes of William Stukeley and Iolo Morganwag, had its origins more in the milieu of freemasonry than any lineal connection to the ancient Celtic Druids and their culture, which survived latest in the Gaelic world with the filí and seanchaí (existing alongside Christianity). Thus neo-paganism had a very limited appeal to most people in Celtic nations, instead being largely English and Welsh based. English-based quasi-masonic groups such as the Ancient Order of Druids provided the inspiration for Iolo's Gorsedd. Later masonic groups and writers such as Godfrey Higgins and then Robert Wentworth Little's Ancient and Archaeological Order of Druids, were English founded or based.)

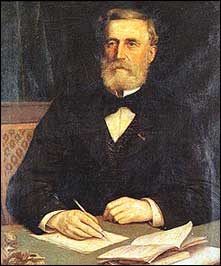
The Breton scholar Théodore Hersart de La Villemarqué attended the first Pan-Celtic Congress in 1838.

In the 1820s, early pan-Celtic contacts began to develop, firstly between the Welsh and the Bretons, as Thomas Price and Jean-François Le Gonidec worked together to translate the New Testament into Breton. The two men were champions of their respective languages and both highly influential in their own countries. It was in this spirit that a Pan-Celtic Congress took place at the Cymreigyddion y Fenni's annual Eisteddfod in Abergavenny in 1838, where Bretons attended. Among these participants was Théodore Hersart de La Villemarqué, author of the Macpherson-Morganwg influenced Barzaz Breiz, who imported the Gorsedd idea into Brittany. Indeed, the Breton nationalists would be the most enthusiastic pan-Celticists, acting as a lynch-pin between the different parts; "trapped" within another state (France), this allowed them to draw strength from kindred peoples across the Channel and they also shared a strong attachment to the Catholic faith with the Irish.

Across Europe, modern Celtic Studies were developing as an academic discipline. The Germans led the way in the field with Indo-European linguist Franz Bopp in 1838, followed up by Johann Kaspar Zeuss' Grammatica Celtica (1853). Indeed, as German power was growing in rivalry with France and England, the Celtic Question was of interest to them and they were able to perceive the shift towards Celtic-based nationalisms. Heinrich Zimmer, the Professor of Celtic at Friedrich Wilhelm University in Berlin (predecessor of Kuno Meyer), spoke in 1899 of the powerful agitation in the "Celtic fringe of the United Kingdom's rich overcoat" and predicted that pan-Celticism would become a political force as important to the future of European politics as the much more established movements of pan-Germanism and pan-Slavism. Other academic treatments included Ernest Renan's La Poésie des races celtiques (1854) and Matthew Arnold's The Study of Celtic Literature (1867). The attention given by Arnold was a double-edged sword; he lauded Celtic poetic and musical achievements, but effeminised them and suggested they needed the cement of a sober, orderly Anglo-Saxon rule.

A concept arose among some European philologists, particularly articulated by Karl Wilhelm Friedrich Schlegel, whereby the "care of the national language is a sacred trust", or put more simply, "no language, no nation." This dictum was also adopted by nationalists in Celtic nations, particularly Thomas Davis of the Young Ireland movement, who, contrary to the earlier Catholic-based "civic rights" activism of a Daniel O'Connell, asserted an Irish nationalism where the Irish language would become hegemonic once again. As he claimed a "people without a language of its own is only half a nation." In a less explicitly political context, language revivalist groups emerged such as the Society for the Preservation of the Irish Language, which would later become the Gaelic League. In a Pan-Celtic context, Charles de Gaulle (uncle of the more famous General Charles de Gaulle), who involved himself in Breton autonomism and advocated for a Celtic Union in 1864, argued that "so long as a conquered people speaks another language than their conquers, the best part of them remains free." De Gaulle corresponded with people in Brittany, Ireland, Scotland and Wales, arguing that each needed to cooperate in a spirit of Celtic unity and above all defend their native languages or otherwise their position as Celtic nations would be extinct. A Pan-Celtic review was founded by de Gaulle's comrade Henri Gaidoz in 1873, known as Revue Celtique.

In 1867 de Gaulle organised the first ever Pan-Celtic gathering in Saint-Brieuc, Brittany. No Irish attended and the guests were mainly Welsh and Breton.

T. E. Ellis, the leader of Cymru Fydd was a proponent of Pan-Celticism, stating "We must work for bringing together Celtic reformers and Celtic peoples. The interests of Irishmen, Welshmen and [Scottish] Crofters are almost identical. Their past history is very similar, their present oppressors are the same and their immediate wants are the same.

=== Pan-Celtic Congress and the Celtic Association era ===
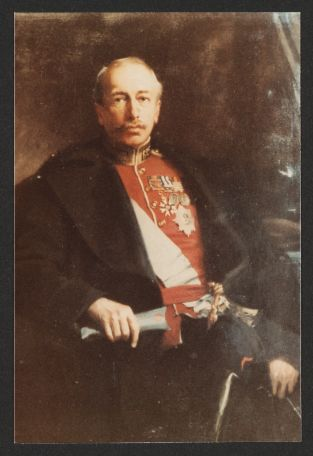
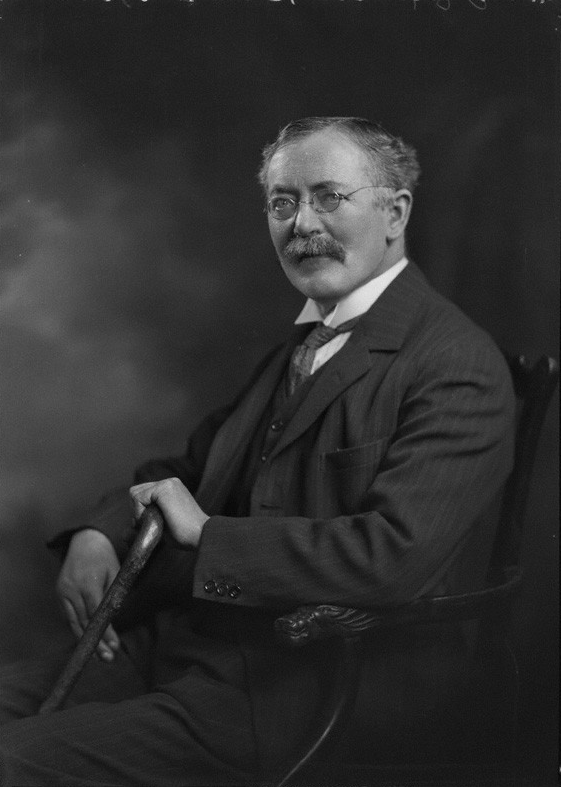
Bernard FitzPatrick, Lord Castletown and Edmund Edward Fournier d'Albe, founders of the Celtic Association. Through their activities, three Pan-Celtic Congresses were held at the start of the 20th century.

The first major Pan-Celtic Congress was organised by Edmund Edward Fournier d'Albe and Bernard FitzPatrick, 2nd Baron Castletown, under the auspices of their Celtic Association and was held in August 1901 in Dublin. This had followed on from an earlier sentiment of pan-Celtic feeling at the National Eisteddfod of Wales, held in Liverpool in 1900. Another influence was Fournier's attendance at Feis Ceoil in the late 1890s, which drew musicians from the different Celtic nations. The two leaders formed somewhat of an idiosyncratic pair; Fournier, of French parentage, embraced an ardent Hibernophilia and learned the Irish language, while FitzPatrick descended from ancient Irish royalty (the Mac Giolla Phádraig of Osraige), but was serving in the British Army and had earlier been a Conservative MP (indeed, the original Pan-Celtic Congress was delayed for a year because of the Second Boer War). The main intellectual organ of the Celtic Association was Celtia: A Pan-Celtic Monthly Magazine, edited by Fournier, which ran from January 1901 until 1904 and was briefly revived in 1907 before finally ending for good in May 1908. Its inception was welcomed by Breton François Jaffrennou. An unrelated publication, The Celtic Review, was founded in 1904 and ran until 1908.

Historian Justin Dolan Stover of Idaho State University describes the movement as having "uneven successes".

In total, the Celtic Association was able to organise three Pan-Celtic Congresses: Dublin (1901), Caernarfon (1904) and Edinburgh (1907). Each of these opened with an elaborate neo-druidic ceremony, with the laying of the Lia Cineil ("Race Stone"), which drew inspiration from the Lia Fáil and Stone of Scone. The stone was five foot high and consisted of five granite blocks, each with a letter of the respective Celtic nation etched into it in their own language (i.e. – "E" for Ireland, "A" for Scotland, "C" for Wales). (Note: Due to the all-but-extinction of the Cornish language, the movement of Cornish nationalism would not be included within the Pan-Celtic Congress until 1904, after Henry Jenner and L. C. R. Duncombe-Jewell of the Cornish Celtic Society made their argument to the Celtic Association. Cornwall ("K") was subsequently added to the Lia Cineil and the Cornish have been recognised as the sixth Celtic nation ever since.) At the laying of the stone, the Archdruid of the Eisteddfod, Hwfa Môn would say three times in Gaelic, while holding a partly unsheathed sword, "Is there peace?" to which the people responded "Peace." The symbolism inherent in this was meant to represent a counterpoise to the British Empire's assimilating Anglo-Saxonism as articulated by the likes of Rudyard Kipling. For the pan-Celts, they imagined a restored "Celtic race", but where each Celtic people would have its own national space without assimilating all into a uniformity. The Lia Cineil was also intended as a phallic symbol, referencing the ancient megaliths historically associated with the Celts and overturning the "feminisation of the Celts by their Saxon neighbours."

The response of the most advanced and militant nationalism of a "Celtic" people; Irish nationalism; was mixed. The pan-Celts were lampooned by D. P. Moran in The Leader, under the title of "Pan-Celtic Farce". The folk costumes and druidic aesthetics were especially mocked, meanwhile Moran, who associated Irish nationality with Catholicism, was suspicious of the Protestantism of both Fournier and FitzPatrick. The participation of the latter as a "Tommy Atkins" against the Boers (whom Irish nationalists supported with the Irish Transvaal Brigade) was also highlighted as unsound. Moran concluded that pan-Celticism was "parasitic" from Irish nationalism, created by a "foreigner" (Fournier) and sought to misdirect Irish energies. Others were less polemical; opinion in the Gaelic League was divided and though they elected not to send an official representative, some members did attend Congress meetings (including Douglas Hyde, Patrick Pearse and Michael Davitt). More enthusiastic was Lady Gregory, who imagined an Ireland-led "Pan-Celtic Empire", while William Butler Yeats also attended the Dublin meeting. Prominent Gaelic League activists such as Pearse, Edward Martyn, John St. Clair Boyd, Thomas William Rolleston, Thomas O'Neill Russell, Maxwell Henry Close and William Gibson all made financial contributions to the Pan-Celtic Congress. Ruaraidh Erskine was an attendant. Erskine himself was an advocate of a "Gaelic confederation" between Ireland and Scotland.

David Lloyd George, who would later to go on to be the Prime Minister of the United Kingdom, delivered a speech at the 1904 Celtic Congress.

Breton Regionalist Union founder Régis de l'Estourbeillon attended the 1907 congress, headed the Breton faction of the procession and placed the Breton stone on the Lia Cineill. Henry Jenner, Arthur William Moore and John Crichton-Stuart, fourth Marquess of Bute likewise attended the 1907 congress.

Erskine made an effort to set up a "union of Welsh, Scots and Irish with a view to action on behalf of Celtic communism". He wrote to Thomas Gwynn Jones asking for suggestions on Welshmen to invite to London for a meeting on setting such a thing up. It is unknown if such a meeting ever took place.

John de Courcy Mac Donnell founded a Celtic Union in Belgium in 1908, which organised the fourth Pan-Celtic congress as part of the 1910 Brussels International Exposition. Exhibitions of hurling were held there and at nearby at Fontenoy, commemorating the Irish Brigade at the 1745 battle. The Celtic Union held further events up to the fifth Pan-Celtic congress 1913 in Ghent/Brussels/Namur.

In Paris, 1912, the "La Ligue Celtique Française" was launched and had a magazine called La Poétique, which published news and literature from all around the Celtic world.

=== Pan-Celticism after the Easter Rising ===
Celtic nationalisms were boosted immensely by the Irish Easter Rising of 1916, where a group of revolutionaries belonging to the Irish Republican Brotherhood struck militantly against the British Empire during World War I to assert an Irish Republic. Part of their political vision, building on earlier Irish-Ireland policies was a re-Gaelicisation of Ireland: that is to say a de-colonisation of Anglo cultural, linguistic and economic hegemony and a re-assertion of the native Celtic culture. After the initial rising, their politics coalesced in Ireland around Sinn Féin. In other Celtic nations, groups were founded holding similar views and voiced solidarity with Ireland during the Irish War of Independence: this included the Breton-journal Breiz Atao, the Scots National League of Ruaraidh Erskine and various figures in Wales who would later go on to found Plaid Cymru. The presence of James Connolly and the October Revolution in Russia taking place at the same time, also led some to imagine a Celtic socialism or communism; an idea associated with Erskine, as well as the revolutionary John Maclean and William Gillies. Erskine claimed the "collectivist ethos in the Celtic past", had been, "undermined by Anglo-Saxon values of greed and selfishness."

The hope of some Celtic nationalists that a semi-independent Ireland could act as a springboard for Irish Republican Army-esque equivalents for their own nations and the "liberation" of the rest of the Celtosphere would prove a disappointment. A militant Scottish volunteer force founded by Gillies, Fianna na hAlba; which like the Óglaigh na hÉireann advocated republicanism and Gaelic nationalism; was discouraged by Michael Collins who advised Gillies that the British state was stronger in Scotland than Ireland and that public opinion was more against them. Once the Irish Free State was established, the ruling parties; Fine Gael or Fianna Fáil; were content to engage in inter-governmental diplomacy with the British state in an effort to have returned the counties in Northern Ireland, rather than supporting Celtic nationalist militants within Britain. The Irish state, particularly under Éamon de Valera did make some effort on the cultural and linguistic front in regards to Pan-Celticism. For instance in the summer of 1947, the Irish Taoiseach de Valera visited the Isle of Man and met with Manxman, Ned Maddrell. While there he had the Irish Folklore Commission make recordings of the last, old, native Manx Gaelic-speakers, including Maddrell.

=== Post-war initiatives and the Celtic League ===
A group called "Aontacht na gCeilteach" (Celtic Unity) was set up to promote the pan-Celtic vision in November 1942. It was headed by Éamonn Mac Murchadha. MI5 believed it to be a secret front for the Irish fascist party Ailtiri na hAiseirghe and was to serve as "a rallying point for Irish, Scottish, Welsh and Breton nationalists". The group had the same postal address as the party. At its foundation the group stated that "the present system is utterly repugnant to the celtic conception of life" and called for a new order based upon a "distinctive celtic philosophy". Ailtiri na hAiseirghe itself had a pan-Celtic vision and had established contacts with pro-Welsh independence political party Plaid Cymru and Scottish independence activist Wendy Wood. One day the party covered South Dublin city with posters saying "Rhyddid i Gymru" (Freedom for Wales) Rhisiart Tal-e-bot, former President of the European Free Alliance Youth is a member.

The rejuvenation of Irish republicanism during the post-war period and into The Troubles had some inspiration not only for other Celtic nationalists, but militant nationalists from other "small nations", such as the Basques with the ETA. Indeed, this was particularly pertinent to the secessionist nationalisms of Spain, as the era of Francoist Spain was coming to a close. As well as this, there was renewed interest in all things Celtic in the 1960s and 1970s. In a less militant fashion, elements within Galician nationalism and Asturian nationalism began to court Pan-Celticism, attending the Festival Interceltique de Lorient and the Pan Celtic Festival at Killarney, as well as joining the International Section of the Celtic League. Although this region had once been under Iberian Celts, had a strong resonance in Gaelic mythology (i.e. – Breogán) and even during the Early Middle Ages had a small enclave of Celtic Briton emigrants at Britonia (similar to the case with Brittany), no Celtic language had been spoken there since the eighth century and today they speak Romance languages. During the so-called "Galician crisis" of 1986, the Galicians were admitted to the Celtic League as a Celtic nation (Paul Mosson had argued for their inclusion in Carn since 1980). This was subsequently overturned the following year, as the Celtic League reaffirmed the Celtic languages as the integral and defining factor in what is a Celtic nation.

=== 21st century ===
Following the Brexit referendum there were calls for Pan-Celtic Unity. In November 2016, the First Minister of Scotland, Nicola Sturgeon stated the idea of a "Celtic Corridor" of the island of Ireland and Scotland appealed to her.

In January 2019 the leader of the Welsh nationalist Plaid Cymru party, Adam Price spoke in favour of cooperation among the Celtic nations of Britain and Ireland following Brexit. Among his proposals were a Celtic Development Bank for joint infrastructure and investment projects in energy, transport and communications in Ireland, Wales, Scotland, and the Isle of Man, and the foundation of a Celtic union, the structure of which is already existent in the Good Friday Agreement according to Price. Speaking to RTÉ, the Irish national broadcaster he proposed Wales and Ireland working together to promote the indigenous languages of each nation.

Blogger Owen Donavan published, on his blog State of Wales, his views on a Celtic confederation, "a voluntary union of sovereign nation-states – between Ireland, Northern Ireland, Scotland and Wales. The Isle of Man would presumably be a candidate for inclusion too. Cornwall and Brittany could be added as future members if they can attain a measure of self-government." He also considered a Celtic Council, a similar co-operation that was proposed by Adam Price. Journalist Jamie Dalgety has also proposed the concept of a Celtic Union involving Scotland and Ireland but suggests that lack of support for Welsh independence may mean that a Gaelic Celtic Union involving may be more appropriate. Bangor University lecturer and journalist, Ifan Morgan Jones has suggested that "a short-term fix for Wales, Scotland and Northern Ireland might be a greater degree of cooperation with each other, as a union within a union." he also suggested that "If they could find a way of working together in their mutual interest, that’s a fair degree of combined influence, particular if the next General Election produces a hung parliament."

== Anti-Celticism ==
A movement among some archeologists known as "Celtoscepticism" emerged from the late 1980s, through the 1990s. This school of thought, initiated by John Collis, sought to undermine the basis of Celticism and cast doubts on the legitimacy of the very concept or any usage of the term "Celts". This strain of thought was particularly hostile to all but archaeological evidence. Partly a reaction to the rise in Celtic devolutionist tendencies, these scholars were opposed to describing the Iron Age people of Britain as Celtic Britons and even disliked the use of the phrase Celtic in describing the Celtic language family. Collis, an Englishman from the University of Cambridge, was hostile to the methodology of German professor Gustaf Kossinna and was hostile to Celts as an ethnic identity coalescing around a concept of hereditary ancestry, culture and language (claiming this was "racist"). Aside from this Collis was hostile to the use of Classical literature and Irish literature as a source for the Iron Age period, as exemplified by Celtic scholars such as Barry Cunliffe. Throughout the duration of the debate on the historicity of the ancient Celts, John T. Koch stated that it is "the scientific fact of a Celtic family of languages that has weathered unscathed the Celtosceptic controversy."

Collis was not the only figure in this field. The two other figures most prominent in the field were Malcolm Chapman with his The Celts: The Construction of a Myth (1992) and Simon James of the University of Leicester with his The Atlantic Celts: Ancient People or Modern Invention? (1999). In particular, James engaged in a particularly heated exchange with Vincent Megaw (and his wife Ruth) on the pages of Antiquity. The Megaws (along with others such as Peter Berresford Ellis) suspected a politically motivated agenda; driven by English nationalist resentment and anxiety at British Imperial decline; in the whole premise of Celtosceptic theorists (such as Chapman, Nick Merriman and J. D. Hill) and that the anti-Celtic position was a reaction to the formation of a Scottish Parliament and Welsh Assembly. For his part, James stepped forward to defend his fellow Celtosceptics, claiming that their rejection of the Celtic idea was politically motivated, but invoked "multiculturalism" and sought to deconstruct the past and imagine it as more "diverse", rather than a Celtic uniformity.

Attempts to identify a distinct Celtic Race were made by the "Harvard Archaeological Mission to Ireland" in the 1930s, led by Earnest Hooton, which drew the conclusions needed by its sponsor-government. The findings were vague and did not stand up to scrutiny, and were not pursued after 1945. The genetic studies by David Reich suggest that the Celtic areas had three major population changes, and that the last group in the Iron Age, who spoke Celtic languages, had arrived in about 1000 BCE, after the building of iconic supposedly-Celtic monuments like Stonehenge and Newgrange. Reich confirmed that the Indo-European root of the Celtic languages reflected a population shift, and was not just a linguistic adoption.

== Manifestations ==
Pan-Celticism can operate on one or all of the following levels listed below:

=== Linguistics ===
Linguistic organisations promote linguistic ties, notably the Gorsedd in Wales, Cornwall and Brittany, and the Irish government-sponsored Columba Initiative between Ireland and Scotland. Often, there is a split here between the Irish, Scots and Manx, who use Q-Celtic Goidelic languages, and the Welsh, Cornish and Bretons, who speak P-Celtic Brythonic languages.

=== Music ===
Our blossom is red as the life's blood we shed
For Liberty's cause against alien laws
When Lochiel and O'Neill and Llewellyn drew steel
For Alba and Erin and Cambria's weal

The flower of the free, the heather, the heather
The Bretons and Scots and Irish together
The Manx and the Welsh and Cornish forever
Six nations are we all Celtic and free!

— Alfred Perceval Graves, Song of the Celts.

Music is a notable aspect of Celtic cultural links. Inter-Celtic festivals have been gaining popularity, and some of the most notable include those at Lorient, Ortigueira, Killarney, Kilkenny, Letterkenny and Celtic Connections in Glasgow.

=== Sports ===
==== Wrestling ====
There are similarities across Celtic wrestling styles, with many commentators suggesting that this indicates they stem from a common style.

In the Middle Ages it is known that the "champions from the Emerald Isle (the Green Island or Ireland) met the Cornish regularly to wrestle". The Irish style is known as Collar-and-elbow wrestling and uses a "jacket" as does Cornish wrestling. This was still true in the 1800s when Irish champions regularly came to London to wrestle Cornish and Devonian champions.

Cornwall and Brittany have similar wrestling styles (Cornish wrestling and Gouren respectively). There have been matches between wrestlers in these styles over centuries. For example, in 1551 between Cornish soldiers, involved with Edward VI's investing Henri II with the Order of the Garter, and Breton "farmers". There is folklore that fishing disputes between Cornish and Breton fishermen were settled with wrestling matches.

More formally Inter-Celtic championships between Cornwall and Brittany started in 1928, but became less frequent since the 1980s.

The Celtic wrestling championship started in 1985 comprising Gouren and Scottish Backhold or Cumberland and Westmorland wrestling and sometimes other styles such as Cornish wrestling.

Teams that have competed in the Celtic wrestling championship include:

- Brittany
- Canaries
- Cornwall
- England
- Fryslan
- Iceland
- Ireland
- Leon
- Salzburg
- Sardinia
- Scotland
- Sweden

==== Hurling and Shinty ====
Ireland and Scotland play each other at hurling/shinty internationals.

==== Handball ====
As with Hurling and Shinty, Irish handball and Welsh handball (Welsh: Pêl-Law) share an ancient Celtic origin, but over the centuries they developed into two separate sports with different rules and international organisations.

Informal inter-Celtic matches were very likely a feature of industrial southern Wales in the nineteenth century, with Irish immigrant workers said to have enjoyed playing the Welsh game. However, attempts to play formal inter-Celtic matches would only begin after the formation of The Welsh Handball Association in 1987. The association was tasked with playing international matches against nations with similar sports such as Ireland, USA (American Handball) and England (Fives). To facilitate international competition, a new set of rules were devised, and even Wales' most famous Pêl-Law court (The Nelson Court) was given new markings, more in-keeping with the Irish game.

Meaningful Welsh-Irish matches finally became a reality in October 1994, with "The One Wall World Championships" held in Dublin and an inaugural "European One Wall Handball Tournament" held at three courts across southern Wales the following May. The 1990s were the high point for these inter-Celtic rivalries. The success of Wales' Lee Davies (World Champion in 1997) saw large crowds and high public interest. In recent years however, the decline of handball in Wales has resulted in little interest in inter-Celtic competition.

==== Rugby ====
A Pan-Celtic rugby tournament had been the subject of intermittent discussions throughout the early years of professionalism. The first material steps toward a Pan-Celtic league were taken in the 1999–2000 season, when the Scottish districts Edinburgh and Glasgow were invited to join the fully professional Welsh Premier Division, creating the Welsh–Scottish League. In 2001, the four provinces of the Irish Rugby Football Union (IRFU) joined, with the new format being named the Celtic League.

Today, the tournament is known as the United Rugby Championship, and has since expanded into Italy and South Africa, with no plans for expansion into the other Celtic nations. However, inter-Celtic rivalries continue within the league, under the legal name of the body running the competition Celtic Rugby DAC.

In Women's rugby union, The IRFU, WRU and SRU established the Celtic Challenge competition in 2023. While the first tournament was contested by one team from each nation (Combined Provinces XV, Welsh Development XV and the Thistles), it is hoped that the tournament will expand to six competing teams (two from each union) in 2024, with further expansions planned over the next 3 to 5 years.

=== Political ===
Political groups such as the Celtic League, along with Plaid Cymru and the Scottish National Party have co-operated at some levels in the Parliament of the United Kingdom, and Plaid Cymru has asked questions in Parliament about Cornwall and cooperates with Mebyon Kernow. The Regional Council of Brittany, the governing body of the Region of Brittany, has developed formal cultural links with the Welsh Senedd and there are fact-finding missions. Political pan-Celticism can be taken to include everything from a full federation of independent Celtic states, to occasional political visits. During the Troubles, the Provisional IRA adopted a policy of not mounting attacks in Scotland and Wales, as they viewed England alone as the colonial force occupying Ireland. This was also possibly influenced by the IRA chief of staff Seán Mac Stíofáin (John Stephenson), a London-born republican with pan-Celtic views.

In 2023 a 'Celtic Forum' took place in Brittany. Attendees included First Minister of Wales Mark Drakeford, Deputy First Minister of Scotland, Shona Robison, Leader of the Cornwall Council, Linda Taylor, Republic of Ireland Ambassador to France, Niall Burgess and Loïg Chesnais-Girard, the President of the Regional Council of Brittany. Political representatives from Asturias and Galicia were also present. Drakeford described the forum as "an excellent opportunity to come together as Celtic nations and regions, to build on our cultural and historical links and seek out areas for future collaboration, such as marine energy."

=== Town twinnings ===
Town twinning is common between Wales – Brittany and Ireland – Brittany, covering hundreds of communities, with exchanges of local politicians, choirs, dancers and school groups.

== Historical connections ==
The kingdom of Dál Riata was a Gaelic overkingdom on the western seaboard of Scotland with some territory on the northern coasts of Ireland. In the late sixth and early seventh century it encompassed roughly what is now Argyll and Bute and Lochaber in Scotland and also County Antrim in Northern Ireland.

As recently as the 13th century, "members of the Scottish elite were still proud to proclaim their Gaelic-Irish origins and identified Ireland as the homeland of the Scots." The 14th century Scottish King Robert the Bruce asserted a common identity for Ireland and Scotland. However, in later medieval times, Irish and Scottish interests diverged for a number of reasons, and the two peoples grew estranged. The conversion of the Scots to Protestantism was one factor. The stronger political position of Scotland in relation to England was another. The disparate economic fortunes of the two was a third reason; by the 1840s Scotland was one of the richest areas in the world and Ireland one of the poorest.

Over the centuries there was considerable migration between Ireland and Scotland, primarily as Scots Protestants took part in the plantation of Ulster in the 17th century and then later, as many Irish began to be evicted from their homes, some emigrating to Scottish cities in the 19th century to escape the "Irish famine". Recently the field of Irish-Scottish studies has developed considerably, with the Irish-Scottish Academic Initiative (ISAI) founded in 1995. To date, three international conferences have been held in Ireland and Scotland, in 1997, 2000 and 2002.

== Organisations ==
- The International Celtic Congress is a non-political cultural organisation that promotes the Celtic languages in Ireland, Scotland, Brittany, Wales, Isle of Man and Cornwall.
- The Celtic League, is a Pan-Celtic political organization.

== Celtic regions/countries ==
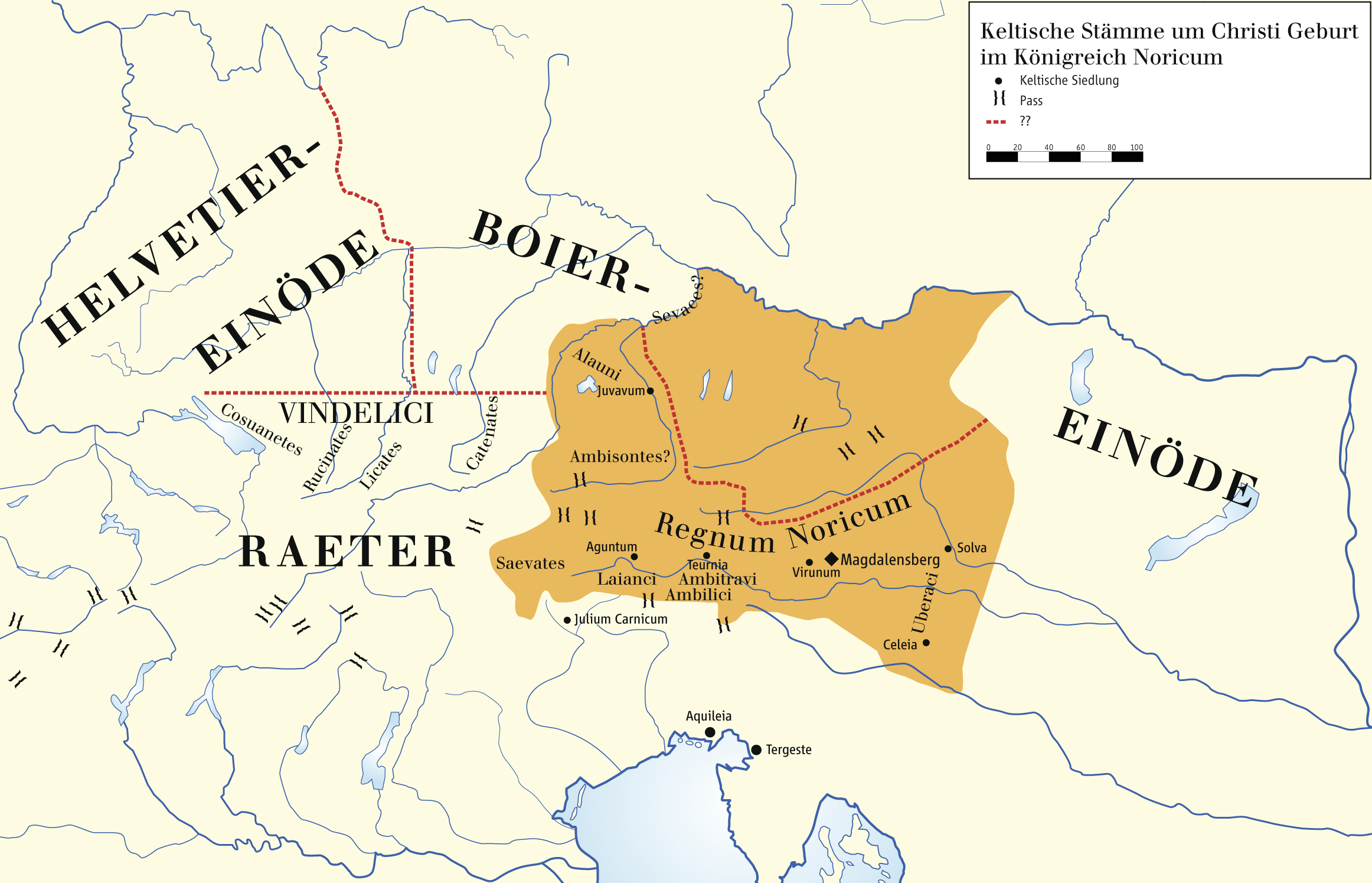
The Celtic Kingdom of Noricum covering most of present Austria in 1 A.D.

A number of Europeans from the central and western regions of the continent have some Celtic ancestry. As such it is generally claimed that the 'litmus test' of Celticism is a surviving Celtic language and it was on this criterion that the Celtic league rejected Galicia. The following regions have a surviving Celtic language and it on this criterion that they are considered, by The Pan Celtic Congress in 1904 and Celtic League, to be the Celtic nations.

- Brittany
- Cornwall
- Ireland
- Isle of Man
- Scotland
- Wales

Other regions with Celtic heritage are:

- Austria – Within the famous Hallstatt cultural region – possible home of the Celts.
- Czech Republic – Home of the Boii (Boiohaemum – Bohemia)
- England
  - Cumbria
  - Devon
- Faroe Islands
- France – Known previously, in classical times, as Gallia/Gaul. Classical writings on Gaul and its native Celtic tribes are the most extensive literature we have from the time.
- Northern Italy, known as Cisalpine Gaul, was inhabited by populations of Celtic lineage.
- Portugal – Home to the Lusitani, Gallaecian, Turdetani and other Celtic tribes.
- Spain – A large portion of the Iberian peninsula was inhabited by Celtic tribes. Spain and Portugal has been hypothesized as the place of origin of the Celts by Professor John Koch, of the University of Wales.
  - Asturias – the principality of Asturias was named after the Astur Celtic tribe.
  - Cantabria – The current autonomous community (former duchy) was named after the Cantabri tribe.
  - Galicia (with North Portugal) – together as Gallaecia
  - Castile and León
  - Castilla–La Mancha
  - Extremadura
  - Community of Madrid
  - Andalusia (Turdetani and other tribes)
- Slovenia Historical part of Celtic Kingdom of Noricum
- Southern Germany
  - Bavaria
  - Baden-Württemberg
  - Rhineland Palatinate
  - Saarland

== Celts outside Europe ==
=== Areas with a Celtic language speaking population ===
There are notable Irish and Scottish Gaelic speaking enclaves in Atlantic Canada.

The Patagonia region of Argentina has a sizeable Welsh speaking population. The Welsh settlement in Argentina started in 1865 and is known as Y Wladfa.

=== The Celtic diaspora ===
The Celtic diaspora in the Americas, as well as New Zealand and Australia, is significant and organised enough that there are numerous organisations, cultural festivals and university-level language classes available in major cities throughout these regions. In the United States, Celtic Family Magazine is a nationally distributed publication providing news, art, and history on Celtic people and their descendants.

The Irish Gaelic games of Gaelic football and hurling are played across the world and are organised by the Gaelic Athletic Association while the Scottish game shinty has seen recent growth in the United States.

== Timeline of Pan-Celticism ==
J.T. Koch observes that modern Pan-Celticism arose in the contest of European romantic pan-nationalism, and like other pan-nationist movements, flourished mainly before the First World War. He sees twentieth century efforts in this regard as possibly arising out of a post-modern search for identity in the face of increased industrialization, urbanization and technology.

- 1820: The Royal Celtic Society founded in Scotland
- 1838: First Celtic Congress called Pan-Celtic Congress, Abergavenny
- 1867: Second Celtic Congress, Saint-Brieuc
- 1888: Pan-Celtic Society formed in Dublin
- 1891:Pan-Celtic Society disbands
- 1919–1922: Irish War of Independence, five-sixths of Ireland becomes independent, Northern Ireland gets devolved government
- 1939–1945: Second World War and German occupation of Brittany
- 1947: Celtic Union formed
- 1950: Collapse of Celtic Union
- 1950: Cornwall hosts its first Celtic congress
- 1961: Modern Celtic League founded at Rhosllanerchrugog
- 1971: Killarney Pan Celtic Festival begins
- 1997: Columba Initiative begins
- 1999: Scottish Parliament and Welsh Assembly open
- 2000: The Cornish Constitutional Convention is formed
- 2000–2001:The Cornish Constitutional Convention collect over 50,000 signatures endorsing the call for a Cornish Assembly.

== See also ==
- Agnes O'Farrelly
- Alan Heusaff
- Armes Prydein
- Charles de Gaulle
- John Stuart Stuart-Glennie
- Mona Douglas
- Richard Jenkin
- Ruaraidh Erskine
- Sophia Morrison
- Théodore Hersart de la Villemarqué
