= Cantons of the Côtes-d'Armor department =

The following is a list of the 27 cantons of the Côtes-d'Armor department, in France, following the French canton reorganisation which came into effect in March 2015:

- Bégard
- Broons
- Callac
- Dinan
- Guerlédan
- Guingamp
- Lamballe-Armor
- Lannion
- Lanvallay
- Loudéac
- Paimpol
- Perros-Guirec
- Plaintel
- Plancoët
- Plélo
- Plénée-Jugon
- Pléneuf-Val-André
- Plérin
- Pleslin-Trigavou
- Plestin-les-Grèves
- Ploufragan
- Plouha
- Rostrenen
- Saint-Brieuc-1
- Saint-Brieuc-2
- Trégueux
- Tréguier
