= Gouët =

Coordinates: 48°32′N 2°45′E

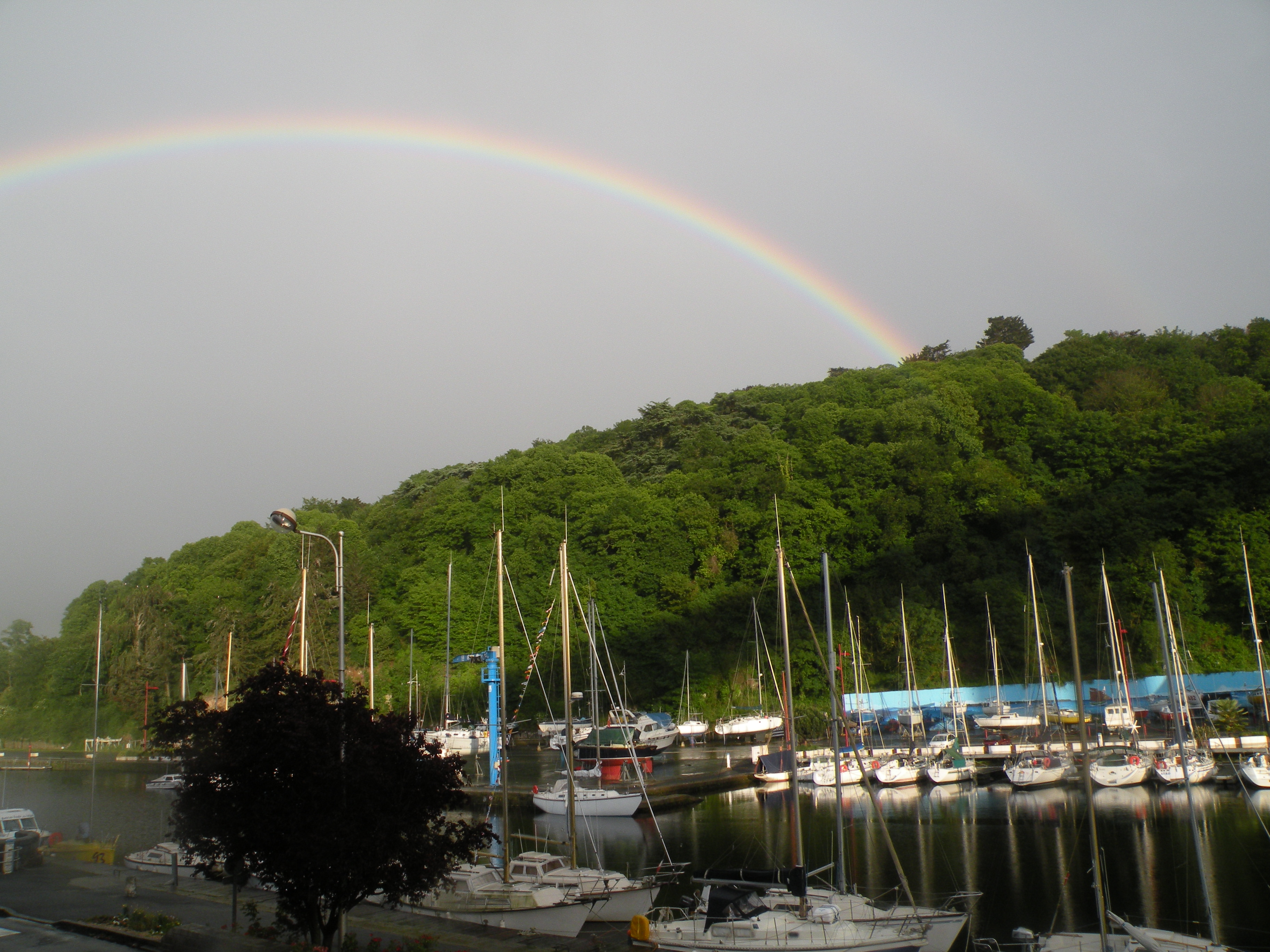
- Gouët

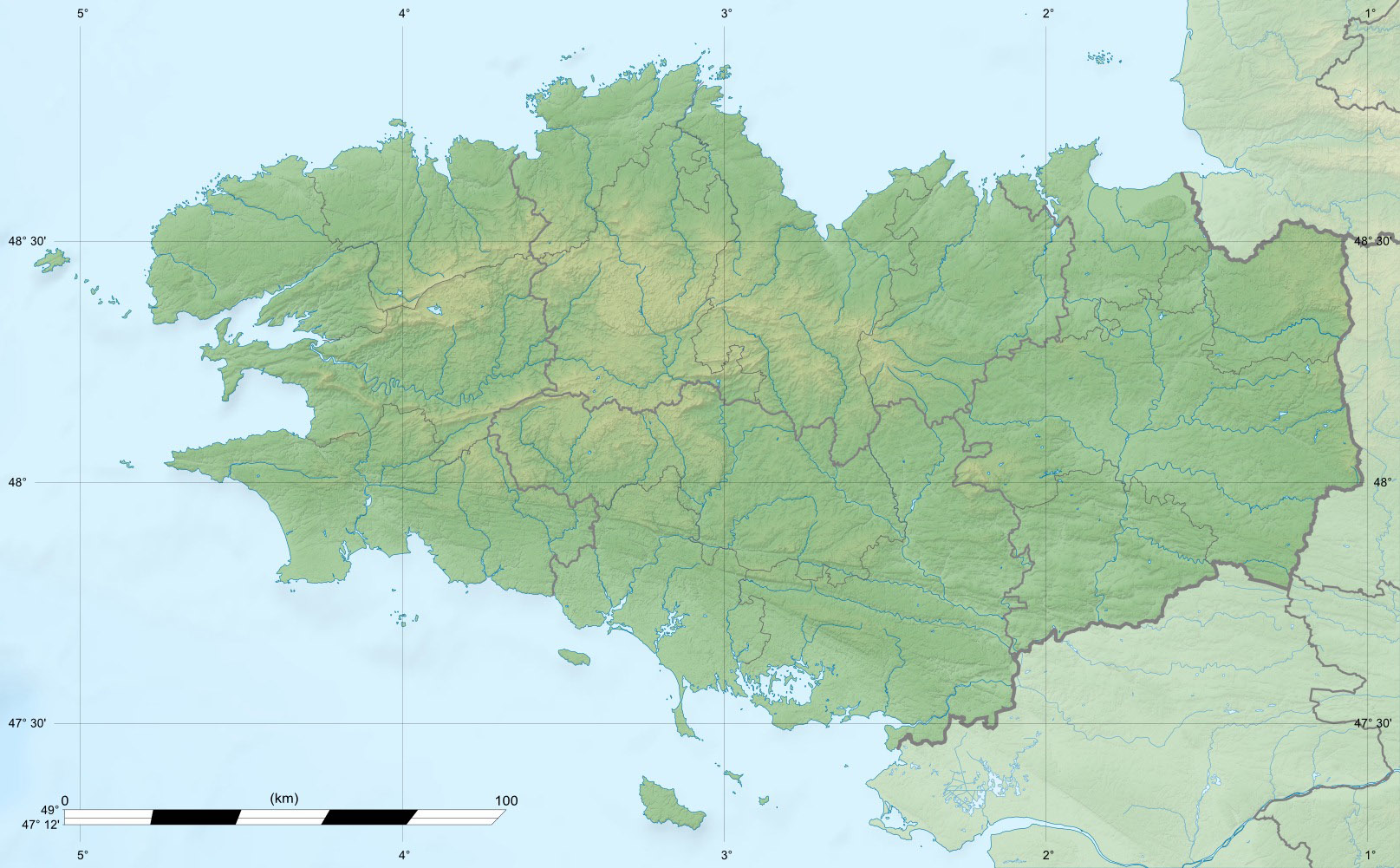
- Native name: Le Gouët (French)

Location
- Country: France

Physical characteristics
- Mouth
  - location: English Channel
- Length: 46.6 km (29.0 mi)
- Basin size: 240 km^{2} (93 sq mi)
- Discharge
  - average: 2.042 m^{3}/s (72.1 cu ft/s)

The Gouët (Breton: Goued) is a river in the department of Côtes-d'Armor, in Brittany, France. It drains into the English Channel.

== Geography ==
The river's source is found at the top of Kerchouan, a shale geological feature located in the commune of La Harmoye. Il prend sa source à la cime de Kerchouan, un relief schisteux situé sur la commune de La Harmoye. Much of the water is from rainfall, however, it is also influenced by a dam in La Méaugon, which collects potable water for the nearby city of Saint-Brieuc. This dam siphons off 86% of the surface of the basin.

The Gouët is an extremely polluted river. Its banks are the site of intensive agriculture, and in addition it receives runoff from multiple nearby oil refineries. Finally, the Gouët is polluted by the waste products from nearby food processing factories.

The river is 46.6 km (29.0 mi) long and it empties into the English Channel at Saint-Brieuc, at the port of Légué, thus separating the cities of Saint-Brieuc and Plérin. The width varies between 10 and 23 feet (3 and 7m). The average discharge measured between 1990 and 1997 was 2.042 m^{3}/s (72.1 cu ft/s), with measured discharges of 12 m^{3}/s (420 cu ft/s) during strong winter floods.

The drainage basin has an area of 251 km^{2} (97 sq mi) and the underlying rock is primarily granite.

== Tributaries ==
- The Gouédic, which empties into the river at Légué.

== Towns ==
Quintin, Ploufragan, Saint-Brieuc, Plérin

== See also ==
- Rivers of France
