= Hôtel de Ville, Saint-Brieuc =

Town hall in Saint-Brieuc, France

Hôtel de Ville
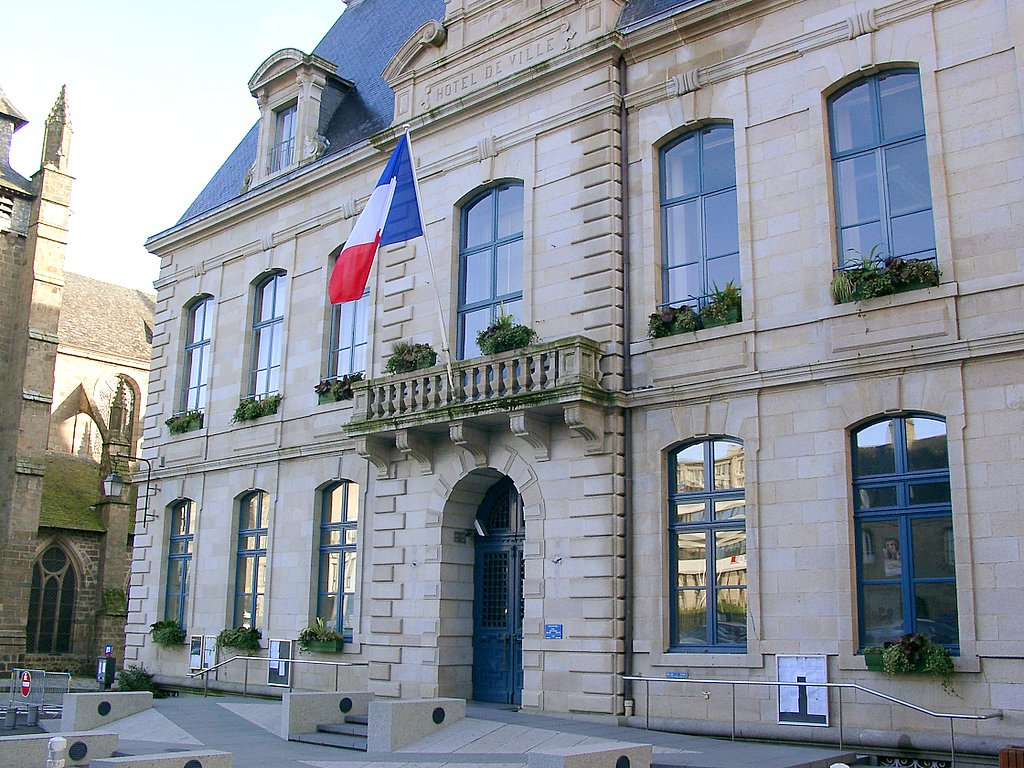
- The main frontage of the Hôtel de Ville in January 2007
- Interactive map of the Hôtel de Ville area

General information
- Type: City hall
- Architectural style: Neoclassical style
- Location: Saint-Brieuc, France
- Coordinates: 48.5138°N 2.7642°W
- Completed: 1873

Design and construction
- Architect: Alphonse Guépin

The Hôtel de Ville (French pronunciation: [otɛl də vil], City Hall) is a municipal building in Saint-Brieuc, Côtes-d'Armor, in northwestern France, standing on Place Général de Gaulle.

== History ==
In the 16th century, the civic officials held their meetings in the Cathedral of Saint-Étienne. This arrangement continued until after the French Revolution, when meetings were moved to the a building on Rue du Parc. By the mid-19th century this building had been demolished, and the site had been occupied by the prefecture of Côtes-d'Armor.

In the early 19th century, the town council led by the mayor, Jean-Louis-Marie Thierry, decided to commission a dedicated town hall. The site they selected, on the east side of the town square, was occupied by the Hôtel Trégomar, a building within the grounds of the cathedral, which had served as a seminary in the 17th century. A substantial programme of conversion works was initiated at a cost of FFr 100,000 in 1806. The works, which included construction of a fire station, a guardhouse and an assembly hall, were completed in 1808.

By the late 1860s, the old town hall was dilapidated and the council, led by the mayor, Gabriel-Toussaint Hérault, decided to demolish the old building and to erect a new building on the same site. The foundation stone for the new building was laid by the mayor in September 1870. It was designed by Alphonse Guépin in the neoclassical style, built in ashlar stone and was completed in 1873.

The design involved a symmetrical main frontage of seven bays facing onto the town square. The central bay, which was slightly projected forward, featured a round headed opening with voussoirs on the ground floor, and a segmental headed French door with a balustraded balcony on the first floor. At roof level, there was a clock which was flanked by pilasters supporting a segmental headed pediment. The other bays were fenestrated by segmental headed windows with keystones on both floors. Internally, the principal room was the Salle du Conseil (council chamber). The building was extended to the south to a design by Paul Courcoux between 1886 and 1888 and was extended to the rear, towards Rue Henri-Servain, in 1913.

Following an armed uprising by the French Resistance on 5 August 1944 and the liberation of the town by American troops on 6 August 1944 during the Second World War, the Chairman of the Provisional Government of the French Republic, General Charles de Gaulle, visited the town hall and met civic officials on 21 July 1945. Another extension to the rear was completed in 1956.
