= Pierre Marie François Ogé =

French sculptor

- Born: 24 March 1849; Saint-Brieuc
- Died: 5 June 1913 (aged 64); Paris
- Occupation: Sculptor

Pierre Marie François Ogé was a French sculptor born in Saint-Brieuc on 24 March 1849 and who died in Paris on 5 June 1913.

== Biography ==
He was the son of the sculptor of the same name and received his first lessons from his father. On his father's death in 1867, he travelled to Paris and worked in the studio of Jean-Baptiste Carpeaux. Under Carpeaux' instructions he worked on the "Cinq Parties du Monde" for the Fontaine du Luxembourg, assisted with the decoration on the front of Valenciennes' town hall and worked on the statue of Jean-Antoine Watteau. On the outbreak of the Franco-Prussian war in 1870, Ogé enlisted with the army of the Loire and returned to work with Carpeaux when hostilities ceased. When Carpeaux died he joined the studio of Jean Louis Adolphe Eude. 1873 saw his first showing at the Paris Salon and he was to be a regular exhibitor there for many years and became a member of the Société des Artistes français. Below are details of some of Ogé's best known works. Ogé was elected professor of design for the Lycées et collèges of Lorient. Many of Ogé's works in bronze were removed during the German occupation and the bronze melted down.

== Main works ==
=== "Le Pilleur de mer" ===
This composition in plaster was Ogé's 1880 submission to the Paris Salon. It was purchased by the Paris municipality and having been cast in bronze was placed in Paris' Parc des Buttes-Chaumont. It was requisitioned by the Germans during the 1939–1945 war and melted down so that the metal could be re-used. Fortunately the original plaster work is held by the Musée de Saint-Brieuc. The Germans took several other bronzes from Buttes-Chaumont including Jean Baffier's statue of Jean-Paul Marat and Camille Lefèvre's "Le Gué"

=== "Le baptême gaulois" ===
This composition was exhibited in 1885 and is held in Saint-Brieuc's museum and art gallery.

=== Virginie ===
This was Ogé's 1883 submission to the Paris salon at which it received a "mention". It is held by the Musée de Saint-Brieuc.

=== Saint Brieuc cathedral ===
In 1891 Ogé completed a sculpture of Bishop Eugène-Ange-Marie Bouché at prayer for Saint Brieuc cathedral.

=== Bust of Jacques Denis Antoine ===
Antoine was the leading architect in the design and building of Paris' Hôtel de la Monnaie and Ogé was commissioned to execute this marble bust in 1900. It stands in the Hôtel de la Monnaie.

=== Monument to Auguste Brizeux ===
Ogé's marble study of the poet Auguste Brizeux dates to 1888 and stands in Lorient's Chevassu park. The model for Oge's study of Auguste Pélage Brizeux is held by the Musée de Quimper.

=== Bust of Armand Marrast ===
This bust of the politician Marrast dates to 1891.

=== Bust entitled "La Bretagne" ===
This 1887 work in white marble is held in Vannes's town hall in their "salle des fêtes".

=== Bust of Edme-François Jomard ===
The bust of Jomard by Ogé dates to 1901 and is held in the Paris Bibliothèque nationale

=== Monument 1870/1871 war ===
The monument to the sixty six men of the Côtes-d'Armor region who served in the Franco-Prussian war is located in Saint Brieuc's cimetière de l'Ouest and features a bronze sculpture of a soldier by Ogé. He is a Breton and although wounded he is refusing to surrender his flag to the enemy.

=== Bust of Numa Denis Fustel de Coulanges ===
This Ogé bust dates to 1905 and is held in the lycée Lakanal in Sceaux.

=== Bust of Philippe-Antoine Merlin de Douai ===
This bust dates to 1881.

=== Monument to Jean-François-Pierre Poulain de Corbion ===
A bronze sculpture depicting Poulain de Corbion was sculpted by Ogé in 1889 and erected in Saint Brieuc but requisitioned by the occupying Germans and melted down in 1942. Poulain Corbion had been the mayor of Saint-Brieuc killed in 1799 by the Chouans,

=== Statue of Henri Dupuy de Lôme ===
Yet another Ogé bronze melted down by the Germans was the 1899 statue of Henri Dupuy de Lôme in Lorient. Stanislas Charles Henri Dupuy de Lôme was a maritime engineer and naval architect. The original statue had stood in Lorient's place d'armes. A replica cast in 1954 is located in the Lorient arsenal but not visible to the public.

== See also ==
- The Saint-Michel cemetery in Saint-Brieuc
