= Hillion =

Hillion Hilion
- Commune
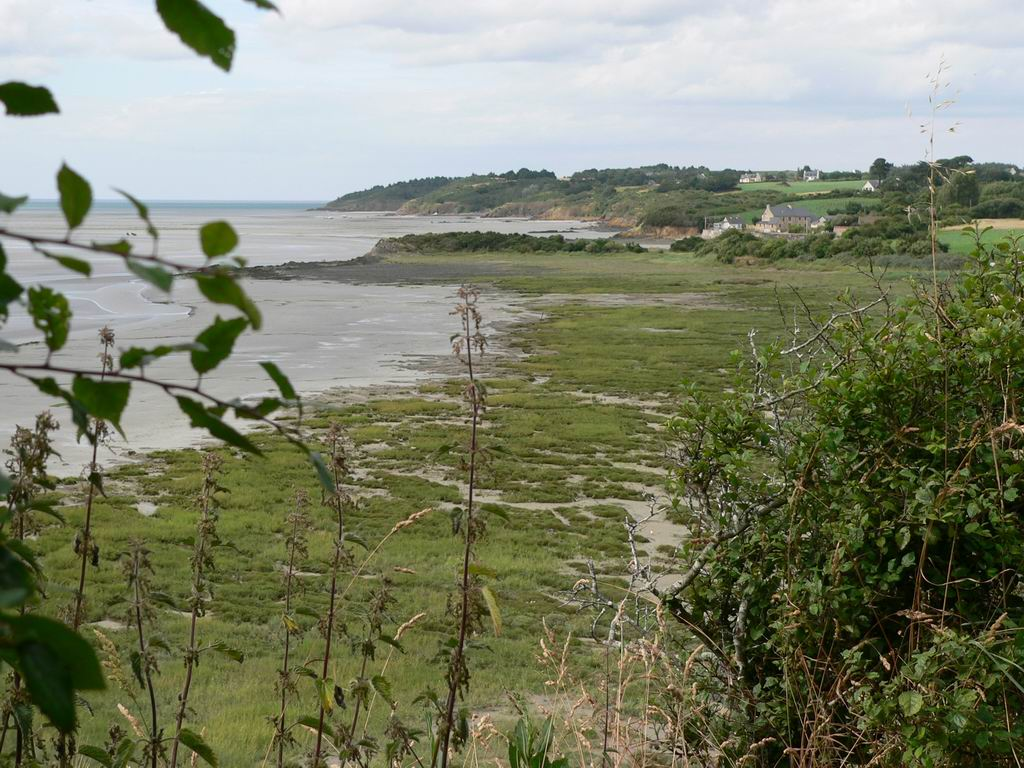
- The Pointe du Grouin, at Hillion

- Flag Coat of arms
- Location of Hillion
- Location within France Location within Brittany
- Coordinates: 48°30′51″N 2°40′03″W
- Country: France
- Region: Brittany
- Department: Côtes-d'Armor
- Arrondissement: Saint-Brieuc
- Canton: Trégueux
- Intercommunality: Saint-Brieuc Armor

Government
  - Mayor (2022–2026): Annie Guennou
- Area^{1}: 24.76 km^{2} (9.56 sq mi)
- Highest elevation: 86 m (282 ft)
- Lowest elevation: 0 m (0 ft)
- Population (2023): 4,335
  - Density: 175.1/km^{2} (453.5/sq mi)
- Time zone: UTC+01:00 (CET)
  - Summer (DST): UTC+02:00 (CEST)
- INSEE/Postal code: 22081 /22120
- ^{1} French Land Register data, which excludes lakes, ponds, glaciers > 1 km^{2} (0.386 sq mi or 247 acres) and river estuaries.

Hillion (French pronunciation: [iljɔ̃]; Breton: Helion; Gallo: Hilion) is a commune in the Côtes-d'Armor department of Brittany in northwestern France.

== Economy ==
Mussel farming is an important activity since 10% of French mussels, about 3 000 to 4 000 tons are produced in Hillion. The species are Mytilus galloprovincialis, adapted to the climate, and Mytilus edulis. Each year, the festival "La fete de la moule" (mussels festival) is held in August in the mussels farm.

== Population ==
Inhabitants of Hillion are called hillionnais in French.

Historical population

Year	Pop.	±% p.a.
1793	1,773	—
1800	1,627	−1.22%
1806	1,857	+2.23%
1821	2,430	+1.81%
1831	2,518	+0.36%
1836	2,527	+0.07%
1841	2,700	+1.33%
1846	2,873	+1.25%
1851	2,748	−0.89%
1856	2,708	−0.29%
1861	2,710	+0.01%
1866	2,649	−0.45%
1872	2,553	−0.61%
1876	2,638	+0.82%
1881	2,648	+0.08%
1886	2,666	+0.14%
1891	2,644	−0.17%
1896	2,723	+0.59%
1901	2,589	−1.00%

Year	Pop.	±% p.a.
1906	2,473	−0.91%
1911	2,317	−1.29%
1921	2,029	−1.32%
1926	1,971	−0.58%
1931	1,953	−0.18%
1936	1,950	−0.03%
1946	1,957	+0.04%
1954	2,006	+0.31%
1962	2,122	+0.71%
1968	2,235	+0.87%
1975	2,858	+3.58%
1982	3,232	+1.77%
1990	3,591	+1.33%
1999	3,786	+0.59%
2007	4,031	+0.79%
2012	4,049	+0.09%
2017	4,137	+0.43%
2023	4,335	+0.78%

Source: EHESS and INSEE (1968-2023)

== See also ==
- Communes of the Côtes-d'Armor department
