= Yffiniac =

Commune in Brittany, France

Yffiniac Ilfinieg
- Commune
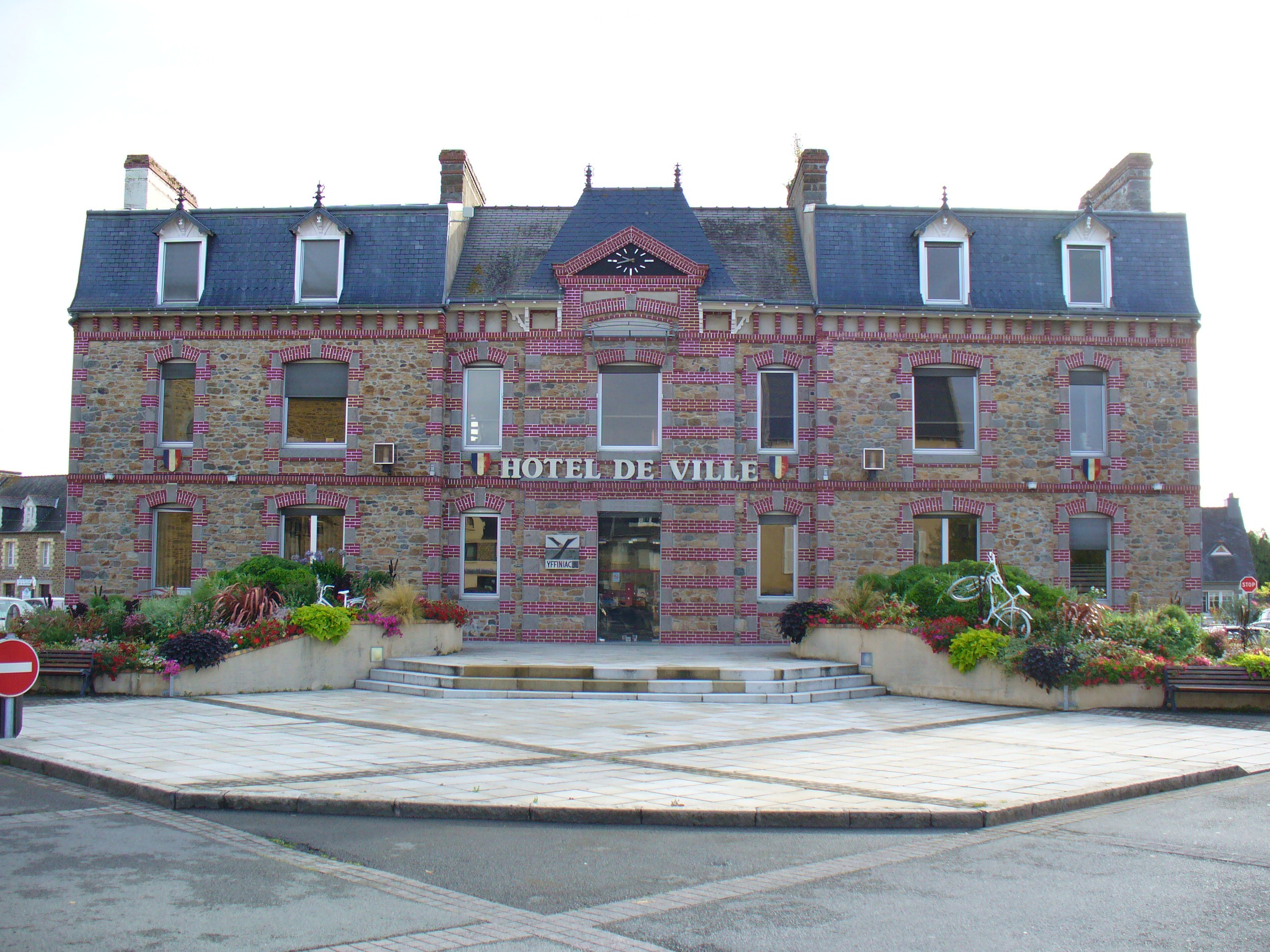
- Town hall

- Flag Coat of arms
- Location of Yffiniac
- Location within France Location within Brittany
- Coordinates: 48°29′09″N 2°40′34″W
- Country: France
- Region: Brittany
- Department: Côtes-d'Armor
- Arrondissement: Saint-Brieuc
- Canton: Trégueux
- Intercommunality: Saint-Brieuc Armor

Government
  - Mayor (2020–2026): Denis Hamayon
- Area^{1}: 17.44 km^{2} (6.73 sq mi)
- Highest elevation: 147 m (482 ft)
- Lowest elevation: 5 m (16 ft)
- Population (2023): 5,074
  - Density: 290.9/km^{2} (753.5/sq mi)
- Time zone: UTC+01:00 (CET)
  - Summer (DST): UTC+02:00 (CEST)
- INSEE/Postal code: 22389 /22120
- ^{1} French Land Register data, which excludes lakes, ponds, glaciers > 1 km^{2} (0.386 sq mi or 247 acres) and river estuaries.

Yffiniac (French pronunciation: [ifiɲak]; Breton: Ilfinieg; Gallo: Finyac) is a commune in the Côtes-d'Armor department of Brittany in northwestern France.

== Population ==
Inhabitants of Yffiniac are called yffiniacais in French.

Historical population
Year	Pop.	±% p.a.
1968	2,252	—
1975	2,895	+3.65%
1982	3,185	+1.37%
1990	3,510	+1.22%
1999	3,842	+1.01%
2007	4,584	+2.23%
2012	4,832	+1.06%
2017	5,010	+0.73%
2023	5,074	+0.21%
Source: INSEE

== Personalities ==
- Roger Flouriot is a writer and was born in Yffiniac.
- Bernard Hinault, cyclist, was born in Yffiniac in 1954.
- Zéphirin Jégard, cyclist, lived in Yffiniac.

== See also ==
- Communes of the Côtes-d'Armor department
