= Arrondissements of the Côtes-d'Armor department =

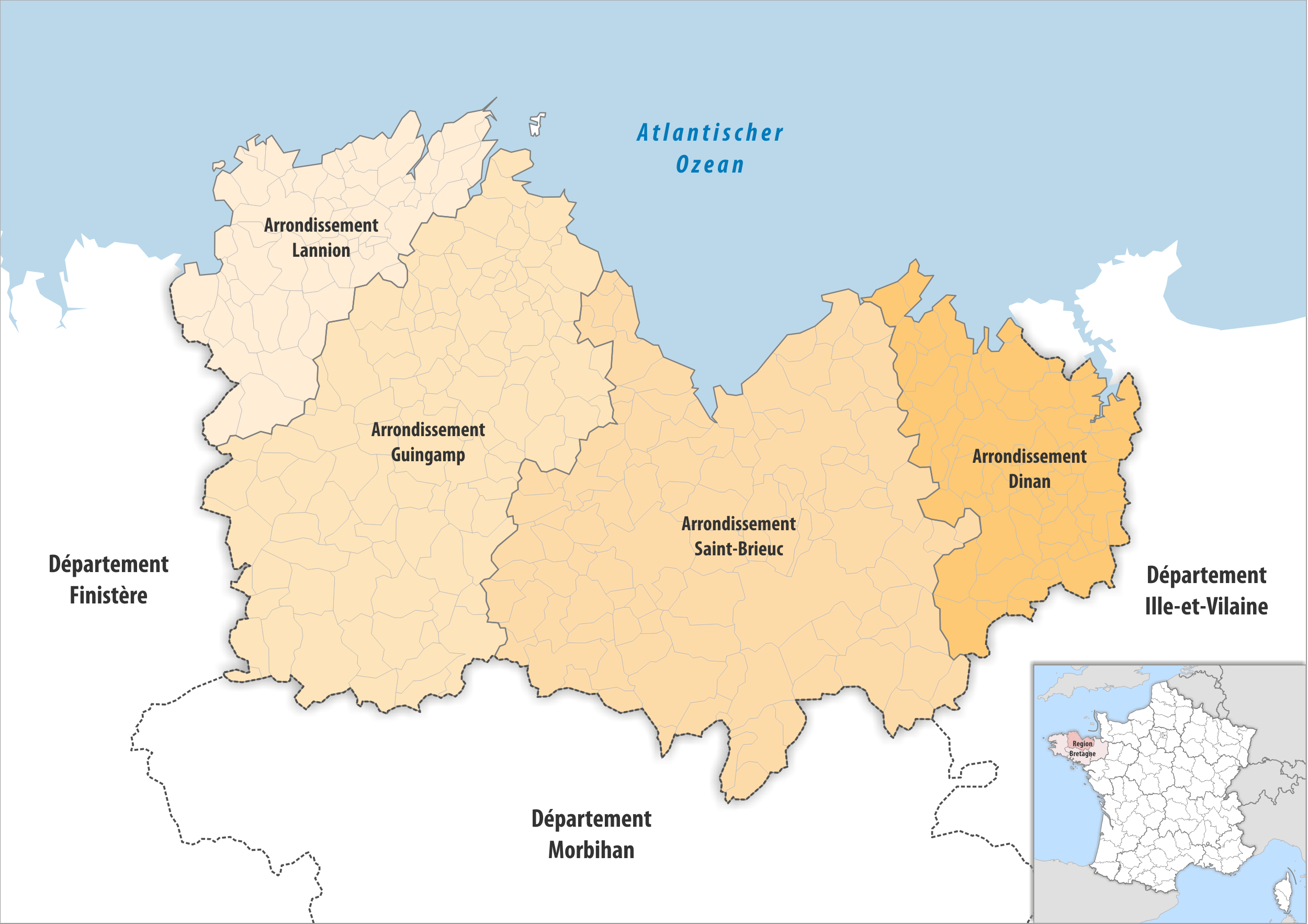
Map of arrondissements of the Côtes-d'Armor department.

The four arrondissements of the Côtes-d'Armor department are:

1. Arrondissement of Dinan, (subprefecture: Dinan) with 67 communes. The population of the arrondissement was 105,848 in 2021.
2. Arrondissement of Guingamp, (subprefecture: Guingamp) with 111 communes. The population of the arrondissement was 125,699 in 2021.
3. Arrondissement of Lannion, (subprefecture: Lannion) with 57 communes. The population of the arrondissement was 100,259 in 2021.
4. Arrondissement of Saint-Brieuc, (prefecture of the Côtes-d'Armor department: Saint-Brieuc) with 113 communes. The population of the arrondissement was 274,111 in 2021.

== History ==
In 1800, the arrondissements of Saint-Brieuc, Dinan, Guingamp, Lannion and Loudéac were established. The arrondissement of Loudéac was disbanded in 1926.

The borders of the arrondissements of Côtes-d'Armor were modified in January 2017:

- 25 communes from the arrondissement of Dinan to the arrondissement of Saint-Brieuc
- five communes from the arrondissement of Guingamp to the arrondissement of Saint-Brieuc
- 29 communes from the arrondissement of Saint-Brieuc to the arrondissement of Guingamp
