= The Saint-Michel cemetery in Saint-Brieuc =

Cemetery in Côtes-d'Armor Department, France

Coordinates: 48.512°N 2.753°W

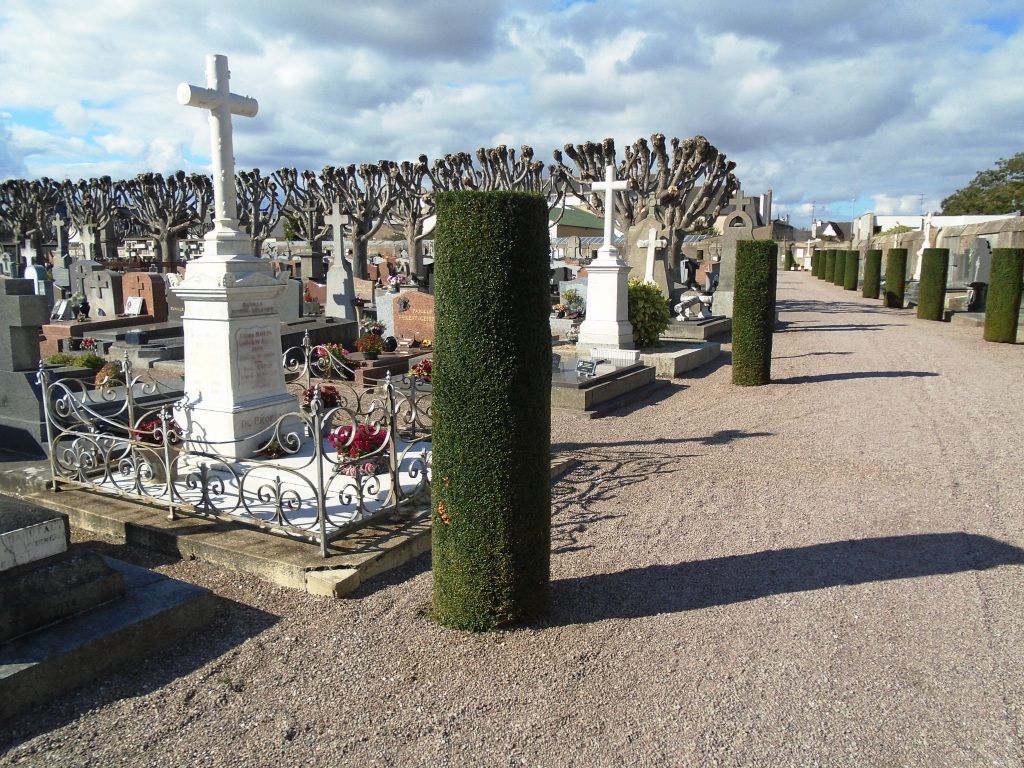
Yew trees in Saint Michel cemetery

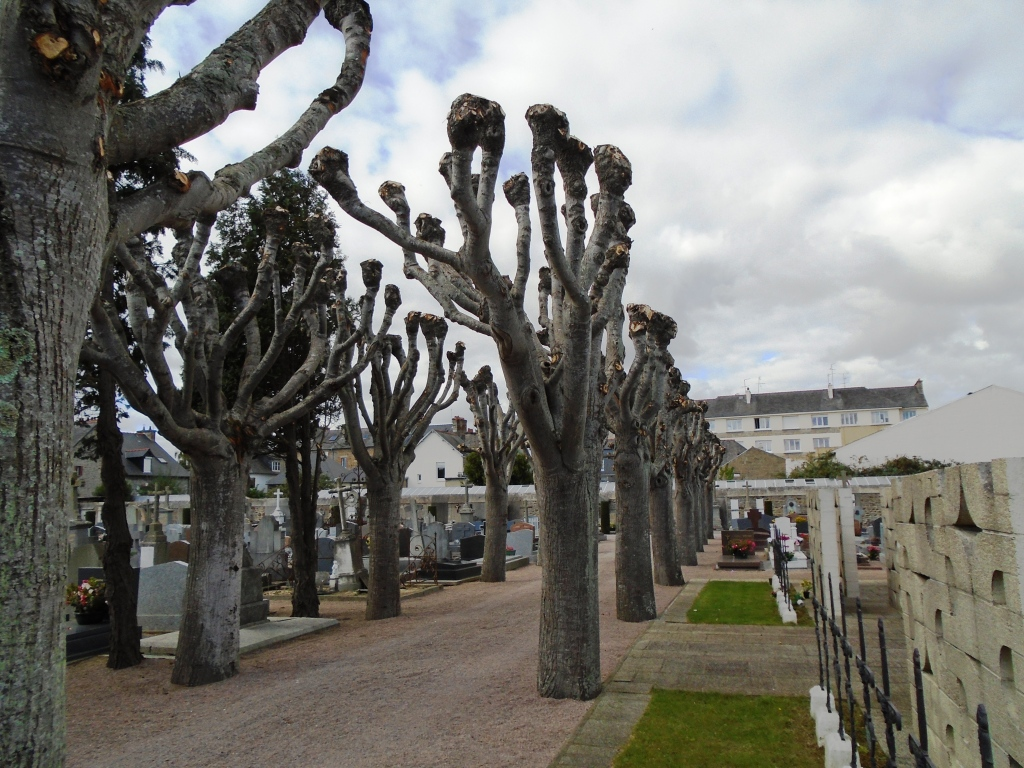
Pollarded trees in Saint Michel cemetery

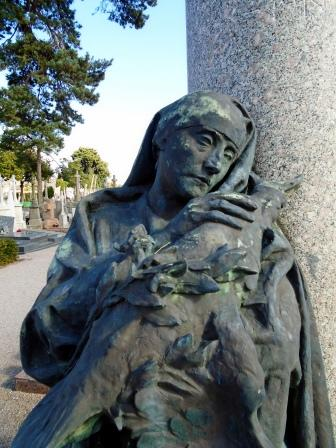
Jean Boucher's allegory decorating the Saint-Brieuc tomb of aviator Edouard Le Mounier

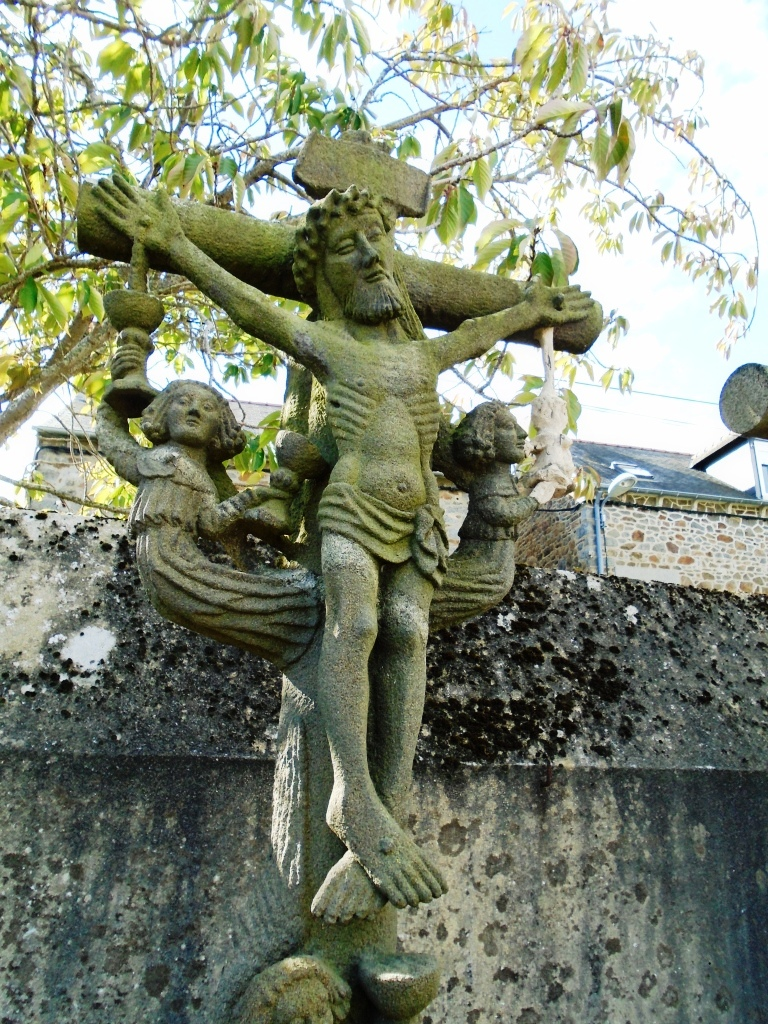
A tomb in the cemetery which replicates a Breton "Calvaire" (Calvary). Note the two angels collecting Jesus' blood into chalices.

The Saint-Michel cemetery' (French: Cimetière Saint-Michel) in Saint-Brieuc is located in the Rue Jobert de Lamballe.

== History ==
The Saint-Michel is the oldest cemetery in Saint-Brieuc and possesses many old tombs including those of notable Bretons and soldiers of Napoleon's armies. It was created in 1839 and there are today between 15,000 and 20,000 burials in 5,000 tombs. The cemetery is beautifully kept and some of the connecting avenues are lined with shaped yew and one is lined with pollarded trees.

== Individual tombs ==
Those buried include-

- Charles Baratoux (1846-1898). Baratoux was the mayor of Saint-Brieuc from 1890 to 1898, Amongst his many achievements was to ensure the supply of drinkable water to the town.
- Alphonse Guépin (1808-1878) French architect.
- Théophile-Marie Laennec, father of the inventor of the stethoscope. His tomb has in fact disappeared.
- Lucien Camus the father of the writer Albert Camus. Lucien died in 1914, a victim of World War I. He had been injured during the Battle of the Marne, was taken to the military hospital in Saint-Brieuc where he died on 17 October 1914. Camus' tomb is in the small military section of the cemetery.
- The priest Father Armand Vallée, a member of the French Resistance who was arrested by the Gestapo and died in 1946 having been deported.
- Mireille Chrisostome (1924-1944). Another member of the French Resistance executed by the Germans.
- The tomb of the aviator Edouard Le Mounier who was killed in action. A bust of Le Mounier stands on a marble column and against the column is the sculptor Jean Boucher's allegory which depicts a veiled and grieving woman representing France who clutches a wounded bird representing the aviator.
- The grave of Pierre Giffard 1836–1915 with bronze medallion by Elie Le Goff.
- The tomb of Léonard Charner (1797-1869), an Admiral of the French Navy.
- The tomb of the sculptor Pierre Marie François Ogé. Ogé's work includes the decoration on the facade of Saint-Brieuc's paiais de justice. Ogé was the sculptor of the war memorial in Saint-Brieuc's cimetière de l'Ouest. This commemorated sixty six men of Saint-Brieuc who lost their life's in the 1870 war. Ogé was himself mobilized in that war. The memorial includes Ogé's sculpture of a wounded Breton soldier. The bust decorating the tomb is by Ogé's son.
- The tomb of the Le Goff family. Elie Le Goff (1858-1938), was a sculptor who executed several works in Saint-Brieuc. He had three sons, Elie, Paul and Henri, all sculptors but all three were killed in the 1914-1918 war. The tomb includes a medallion depicting the three sons and a moving sculpture that had been executed earlier by Paul Le Goff showing mourning women emerging from a chapel. Le Goff had called this work "Funérailles en Bretagne".
- One tomb in the cemetery replicates a Breton calvary. It is beautifully carved and depicts Jesus on the cross. Three angels are included, collecting Jesus' blood into chalices.
- There is a calvary in the cemetery by Hernot erected in 1865

== Gallery of images ==
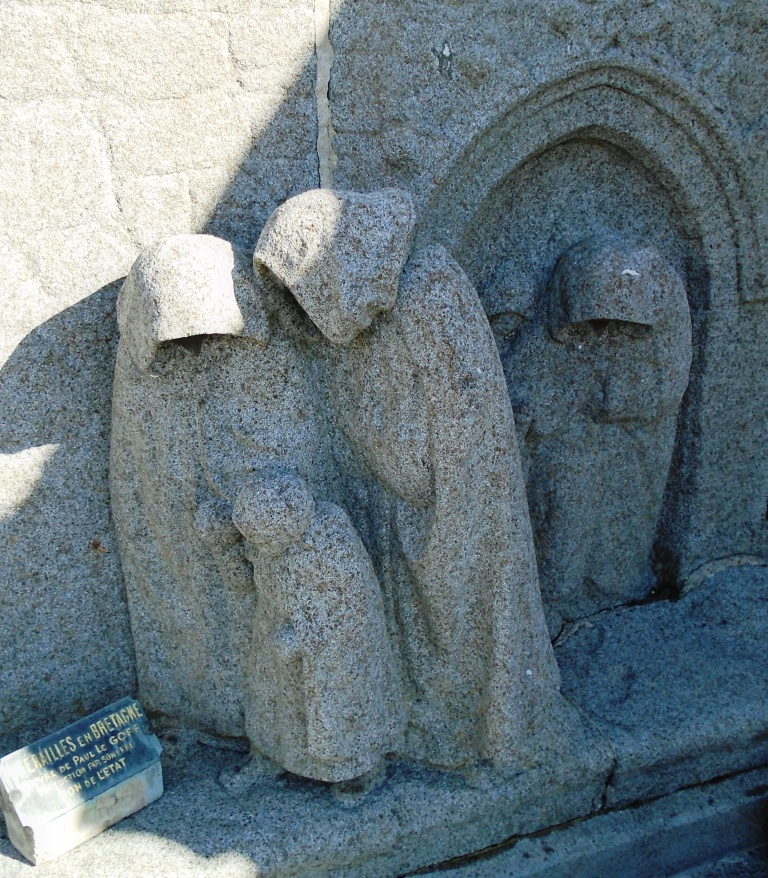
"Funérailles en Bretagne"

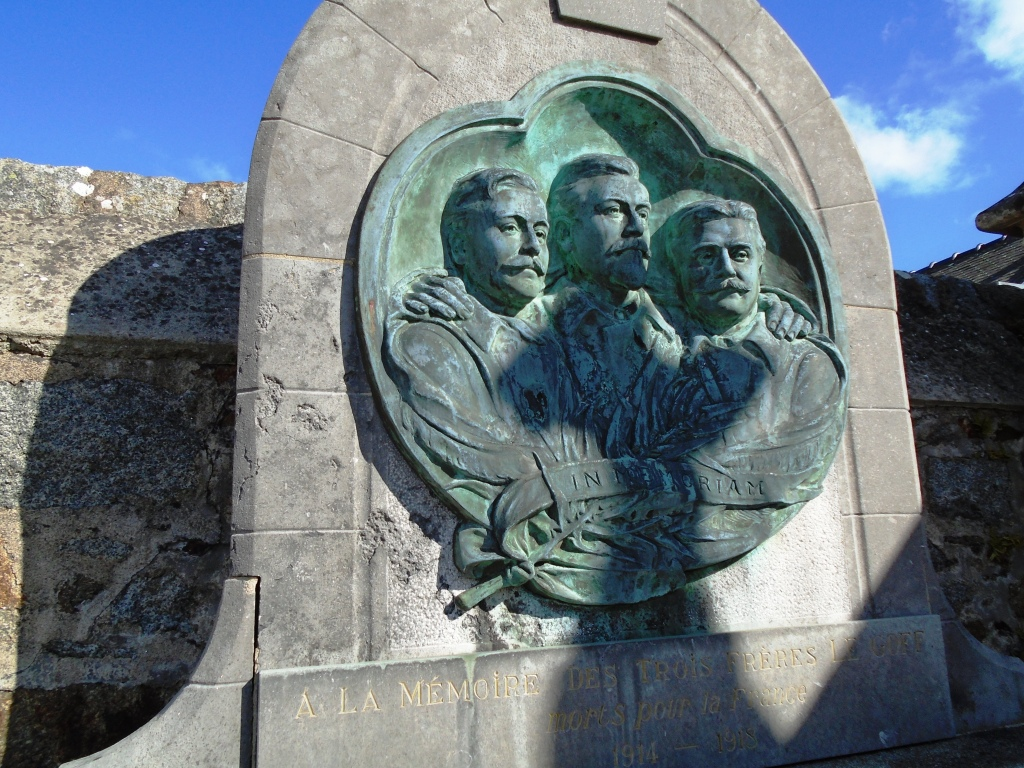
The medallion depicting the three Le Goff brothers

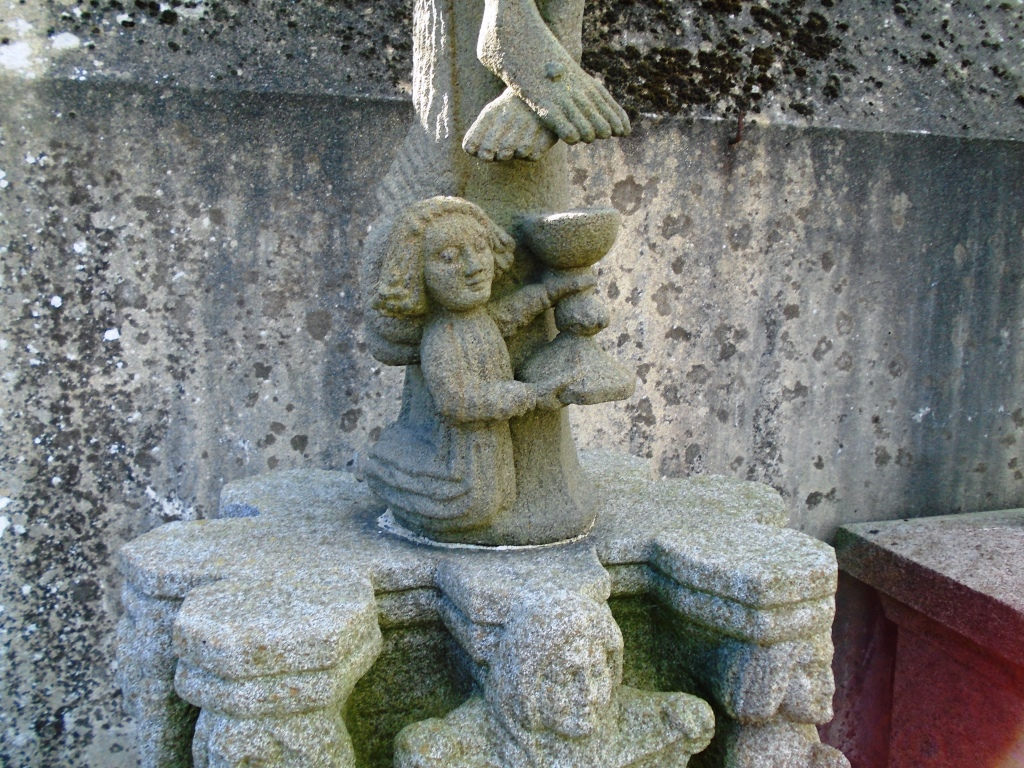
Another view of the "calvaire" type sculpture. Note the angel with chalice collecting blood from Jesus' feet
