= Saint-Julien, Côtes-d'Armor =

Saint-Julien Sant-Juluan-Pentevr
- Commune
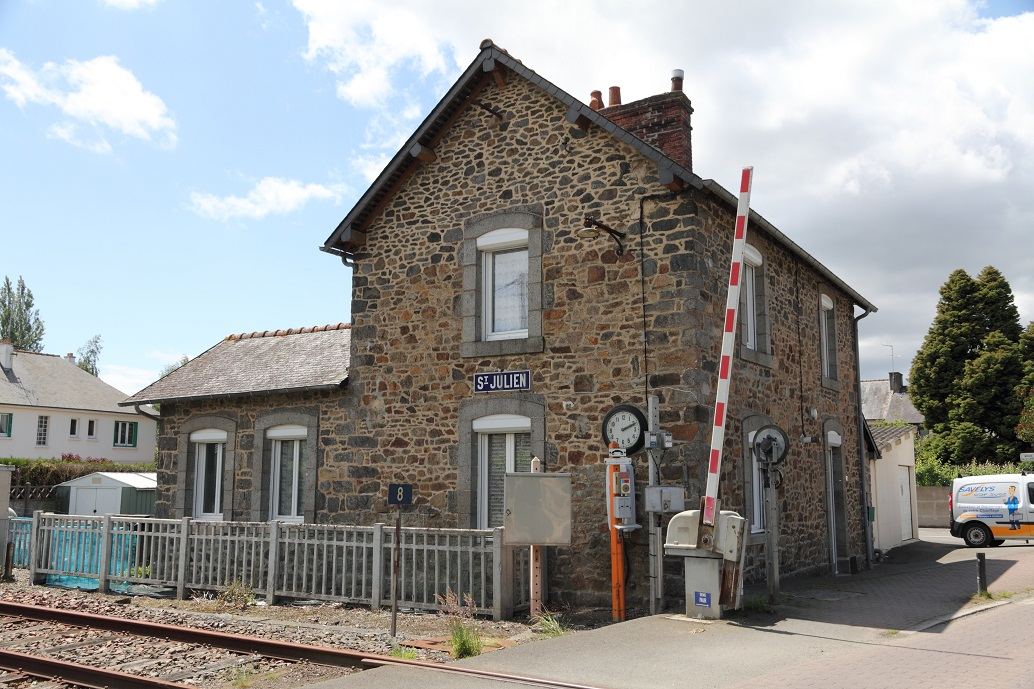
- The former railway station

- Coat of arms
- Location of Saint-Julien
- Location within France Location within Brittany
- Coordinates: 48°27′12″N 2°48′55″W
- Country: France
- Region: Brittany
- Department: Côtes-d'Armor
- Arrondissement: Saint-Brieuc
- Canton: Ploufragan
- Intercommunality: Saint-Brieuc Armor

Government
  - Mayor (2020–2026): Gaël Le Noane
- Area^{1}: 5.69 km^{2} (2.20 sq mi)
- Highest elevation: 197 m (646 ft)
- Lowest elevation: 88 m (289 ft)
- Population (2023): 2,101
  - Density: 369/km^{2} (956/sq mi)
- Time zone: UTC+01:00 (CET)
  - Summer (DST): UTC+02:00 (CEST)
- INSEE/Postal code: 22307 /22940
- ^{1} French Land Register data, which excludes lakes, ponds, glaciers > 1 km^{2} (0.386 sq mi or 247 acres) and river estuaries.

Saint-Julien (French pronunciation: [sɛ̃ ʒyljɛ̃]; Breton: Sant-Juluan-Pentevr) is a commune in the Côtes-d'Armor department of Brittany in northwestern France.

== Population ==
Inhabitants of Saint-Julien are called julianais in French.

Historical population
| Year | Pop. | ±% p.a. |
|---|---|---|
| 1968 | 738 | — |
| 1975 | 893 | +2.76% |
| 1982 | 1,508 | +7.77% |
| 1990 | 1,747 | +1.86% |
| 1999 | 1,755 | +0.05% |
| 2007 | 1,921 | +1.14% |
| 2012 | 2,069 | +1.50% |
| 2017 | 2,050 | −0.18% |
| 2023 | 2,101 | +0.41% |
Source: INSEE

== See also ==
- Communes of the Côtes-d'Armor department
