= Plédran =

Plédran Pledran
- Commune
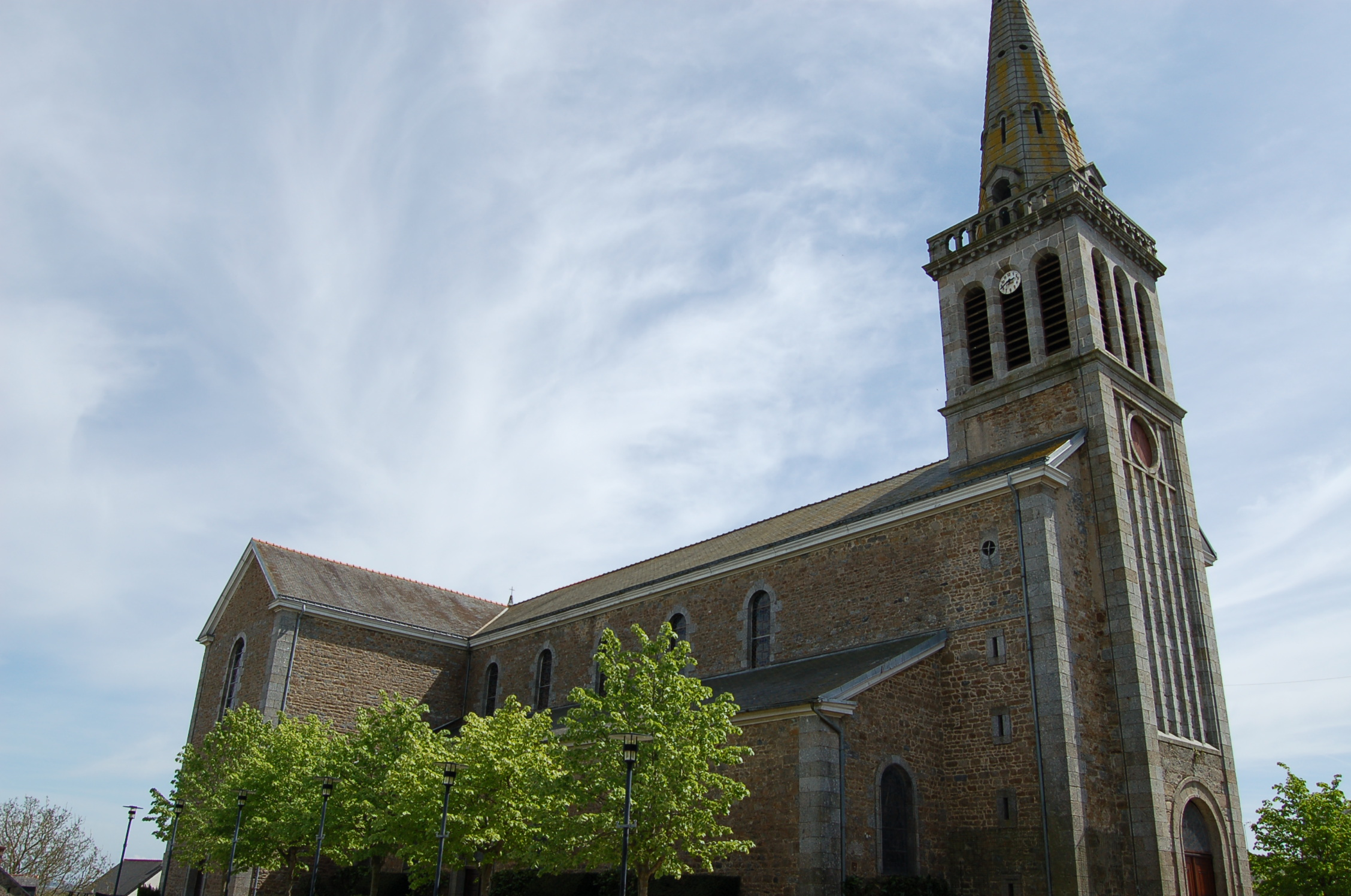
- The church of Plédran

- Flag Coat of arms
- Location of Plédran
- Location within France Location within Brittany
- Coordinates: 48°26′48″N 2°44′41″W
- Country: France
- Region: Brittany
- Department: Côtes-d'Armor
- Arrondissement: Saint-Brieuc
- Canton: Ploufragan
- Intercommunality: Saint-Brieuc Armor

Government
  - Mayor (2020–2026): Stéphane Briend
- Area^{1}: 34.71 km^{2} (13.40 sq mi)
- Highest elevation: 198 m (650 ft)
- Lowest elevation: 41 m (135 ft)
- Population (2023): 6,933
  - Density: 199.7/km^{2} (517.3/sq mi)
- Time zone: UTC+01:00 (CET)
  - Summer (DST): UTC+02:00 (CEST)
- INSEE/Postal code: 22176 /22960
- ^{1} French Land Register data, which excludes lakes, ponds, glaciers > 1 km^{2} (0.386 sq mi or 247 acres) and river estuaries.

Plédran (French pronunciation: [pledʁɑ̃]; Breton: Pledran; Gallo: Plédran) is a commune in the Côtes-d'Armor department of Brittany in northwestern France.

== Population ==
Inhabitants of Plédran are called plédranais in French.

Historical population
Year	Pop.	±% p.a.
1968	3,172	—
1975	4,522	+5.20%
1982	5,043	+1.57%
1990	5,395	+0.85%
1999	5,750	+0.71%
2007	5,727	−0.05%
2012	6,212	+1.64%
2017	6,666	+1.42%
2023	6,933	+0.66%
Source: INSEE

== Twin towns ==
Plédran is twinned with:

- Bembridge, United Kingdom
- Poviglio, Italy

== See also ==
- Communes of the Côtes-d'Armor department
