= Canton of Saint-Brieuc-2 =

Coordinates: 48.52°N 2.75°W

The canton of Saint-Brieuc-2 is an administrative division of the Côtes-d'Armor department, northwestern France. It was created at the French canton reorganisation which came into effect in March 2015. Its seat is in Saint-Brieuc.

It consists of the following communes:

1. Saint-Brieuc (partly)
