= Saint-Brieuc =

Saint-Brieuc Saint-Berieu (Gallo) Sant-Brieg (Breton)
- Prefecture and commune
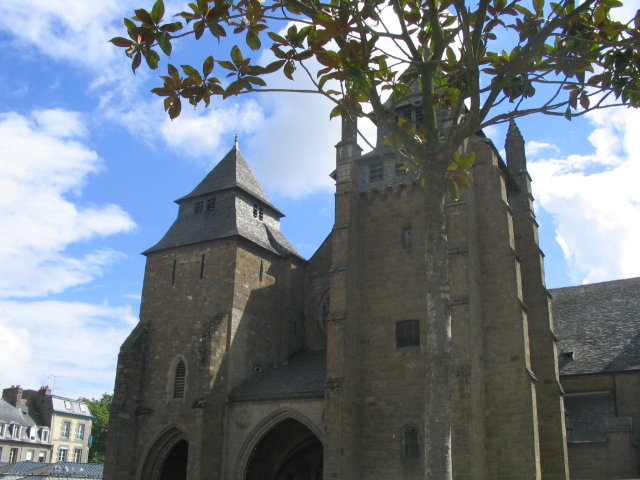
- Saint-Brieuc Cathedral

- Flag Coat of arms
- Location of Saint-Brieuc
- Location within France Location within Brittany
- Coordinates: 48°30′49″N 2°45′55″W
- Country: France
- Region: Brittany
- Department: Côtes-d'Armor
- Arrondissement: Saint-Brieuc
- Canton: Saint-Brieuc-1 and 2
- Intercommunality: Saint-Brieuc Armor

Government
  - Mayor (2020–2026): Valentin Giraudeau
- Area^{1}: 21.88 km^{2} (8.45 sq mi)
- Highest elevation: 134 m (440 ft)
- Lowest elevation: 0 m (0 ft)
- Population (2023): 44,364
  - Density: 2,028/km^{2} (5,251/sq mi)
- Demonym(s): Briochin, Briochine
- Time zone: UTC+01:00 (CET)
  - Summer (DST): UTC+02:00 (CEST)
- INSEE/Postal code: 22278 /22000
- ^{1} French Land Register data, which excludes lakes, ponds, glaciers > 1 km^{2} (0.386 sq mi or 247 acres) and river estuaries.

Saint-Brieuc (French: [sɛ̃ bʁijø]; Breton: Sant-Brieg [sãnt ˈbriːɛk]; Gallo: Saint-Berieu) is a city in the Côtes-d'Armor department in Brittany in northwestern France.

== History ==
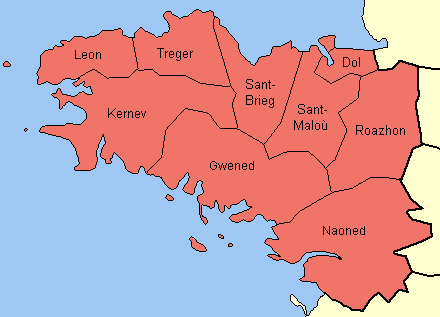
The historic bishoprics of Brittany

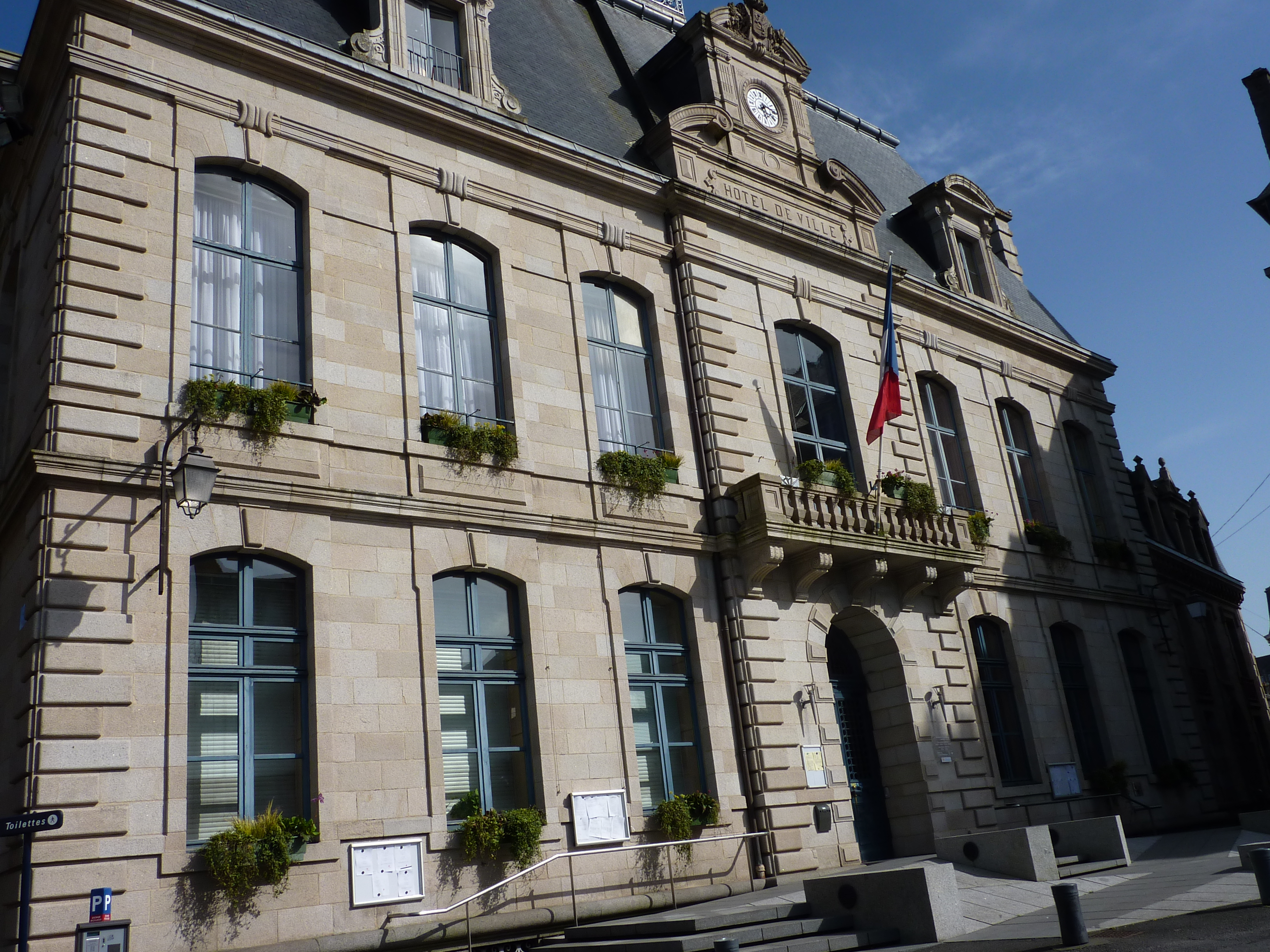
The Hôtel de Ville

Saint-Brieuc is named after a Welsh monk, Brioc, who Christianised the region in the 5th century and established an oratory there. Bro Sant-Brieg/Pays de Saint-Brieuc, one of the nine traditional bishoprics of Brittany, which were used as administrative areas before the French Revolution, was named after Saint-Brieuc. It also dates from the Middle Ages, when the Pays de Saint Brieuc, or Penteur, was established by Duke Arthur II of Brittany as one of his eight "battles" or administrative regions.

The Hôtel de Ville was completed in 1873.

== Geography ==
The town is located by the English Channel, on the Bay of Saint-Brieuc. Two rivers flow through Saint-Brieuc: the Goued/Gouët and the Gouedig/Gouédic.

Other towns of notable size in the département of Côtes d'Armor are Gwengamp/Guingamp, Dinan, and Lannuon/Lannion all sous-préfectures.

In 2009, large amounts of sea lettuce, a type of alga, washed up on many beaches of Brittany, and when it rotted it emitted dangerous levels of hydrogen sulphide. A horse and some dogs died and a council worker driving a truckload of it fell unconscious at the wheel and died.

=== Neighbouring communes ===
Langueux, La Méaugon, Plérin, Ploufragan, Trégueux and Trémuson.

=== Climate ===
Saint-Brieuc experiences an oceanic climate.

Comparison of local Meteorological data with other cities in France
Town	Sunshine (hours/yr)	Rain (mm/yr)	Snow (days/yr)	Storm (days/yr)	Fog (days/yr)
National average	1,973	770	14	22	40
Saint-Brieuc	1,565	774.7	7.4	8.4	44.8
Paris	1,661	637	12	18	10
Nice	2,724	767	1	29	1
Strasbourg	1,693	665	29	29	56
Brest	1,605	1,211	7	12	75

Climate data for Saint-Brieuc (1991–2020 normals, extremes 1985–present)
Month	Jan	Feb	Mar	Apr	May	Jun	Jul	Aug	Sep	Oct	Nov	Dec	Year
Record high °C (°F)	15.9 (60.6)	21.8 (71.2)	23.9 (75.0)	26.6 (79.9)	29.0 (84.2)	34.9 (94.8)	39.7 (103.5)	38.1 (100.6)	31.5 (88.7)	29.5 (85.1)	20.7 (69.3)	16.8 (62.2)	39.7 (103.5)
Mean daily maximum °C (°F)	8.9 (48.0)	9.4 (48.9)	11.4 (52.5)	13.6 (56.5)	16.4 (61.5)	19.3 (66.7)	21.4 (70.5)	21.6 (70.9)	19.5 (67.1)	15.8 (60.4)	12.0 (53.6)	9.5 (49.1)	14.9 (58.8)
Daily mean °C (°F)	6.3 (43.3)	6.5 (43.7)	8.0 (46.4)	9.8 (49.6)	12.5 (54.5)	15.3 (59.5)	17.2 (63.0)	17.4 (63.3)	15.5 (59.9)	12.6 (54.7)	9.2 (48.6)	6.9 (44.4)	11.4 (52.5)
Mean daily minimum °C (°F)	3.8 (38.8)	3.6 (38.5)	4.7 (40.5)	6.0 (42.8)	8.6 (47.5)	11.2 (52.2)	13.0 (55.4)	13.2 (55.8)	11.5 (52.7)	9.4 (48.9)	6.5 (43.7)	4.3 (39.7)	8.0 (46.4)
Record low °C (°F)	−11.3 (11.7)	−9.4 (15.1)	−3.9 (25.0)	−1.8 (28.8)	1.1 (34.0)	3.6 (38.5)	7.1 (44.8)	6.6 (43.9)	4.5 (40.1)	−3.9 (25.0)	−4.8 (23.4)	−7.2 (19.0)	−11.3 (11.7)
Average precipitation mm (inches)	74.2 (2.92)	64.5 (2.54)	53.3 (2.10)	59.7 (2.35)	56.2 (2.21)	50.7 (2.00)	41.9 (1.65)	44.5 (1.75)	52.4 (2.06)	81.6 (3.21)	87.7 (3.45)	90.6 (3.57)	757.3 (29.81)
Average precipitation days (≥ 1.0 mm)	13.5	12.4	10.6	10.9	9.2	7.8	7.3	7.6	8.4	12.8	14.2	14.8	129.6
Mean monthly sunshine hours	65.2	82.9	121.6	163.2	188.1	196.2	198.1	181.8	164.0	109.6	79.3	65.9	1,615.9
Source: Meteociel

== Culture ==
Saint-Brieuc is one of the towns in Europe that host the IU Honors Program.

The Cemetery of Saint Michel contains graves of several notable Bretons, and sculptures by Paul le Goff and Jean Boucher. Outside the wall is Armel Beaufils's statue of Anatole Le Braz. Le Goff, who was killed with his two brothers in World War I, is also commemorated in a street and with his major sculptural work La forme se dégageant de la matière in the central gardens, which also includes a memorial to him by Jules-Charles Le Bozec and work by Francis Renaud.

The town of St. Brieux in Saskatchewan, Canada, is named after Saint-Brieuc of Brittany. It was founded by immigrants from this region in Brittany. It was settled in the early 1900s.

== Demographics ==
Inhabitants of Saint-Brieuc are called Briochins in French.

Historical population

Year	Pop.	±% p.a.
1793	7,335	—
1800	8,394	+1.95%
1806	9,000	+1.17%
1821	9,956	+0.68%
1831	10,420	+0.46%
1836	11,313	+1.66%
1841	12,484	+1.99%
1846	13,239	+1.18%
1851	12,813	−0.65%
1856	14,888	+3.05%
1861	15,341	+0.60%
1866	15,812	+0.61%
1872	15,253	−0.60%
1876	16,355	+1.76%
1881	17,833	+1.75%
1886	19,240	+1.53%
1891	19,948	+0.73%
1896	21,665	+1.67%
1901	22,198	+0.49%

Year	Pop.	±% p.a.
1906	23,041	+0.75%
1911	23,945	+0.77%
1921	24,511	+0.23%
1926	26,043	+1.22%
1931	28,320	+1.69%
1936	31,640	+2.24%
1946	36,674	+1.49%
1954	37,670	+0.34%
1962	43,142	+1.71%
1968	50,281	+2.59%
1975	52,559	+0.63%
1982	48,563	−1.12%
1990	44,752	−1.02%
1999	46,087	+0.33%
2007	46,178	+0.02%
2012	45,936	−0.11%
2017	44,372	−0.69%
2023	44,364	−0.00%

Source: EHESS and INSEE (1968-2023)

== Breton language ==
In 2008, 3.98% of primary school children attended bilingual schools.

== Transport ==
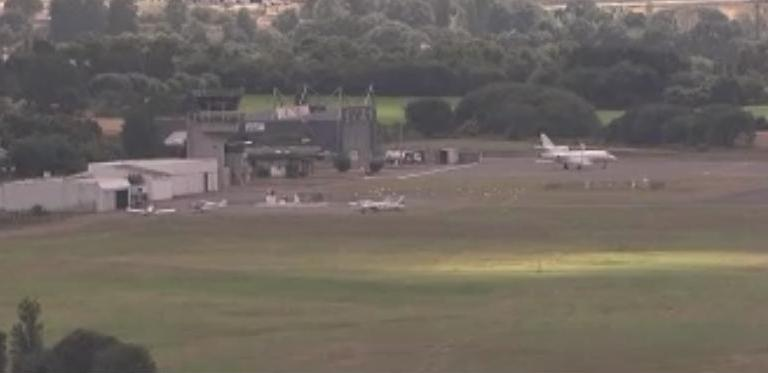
Saint-Brieuc airport

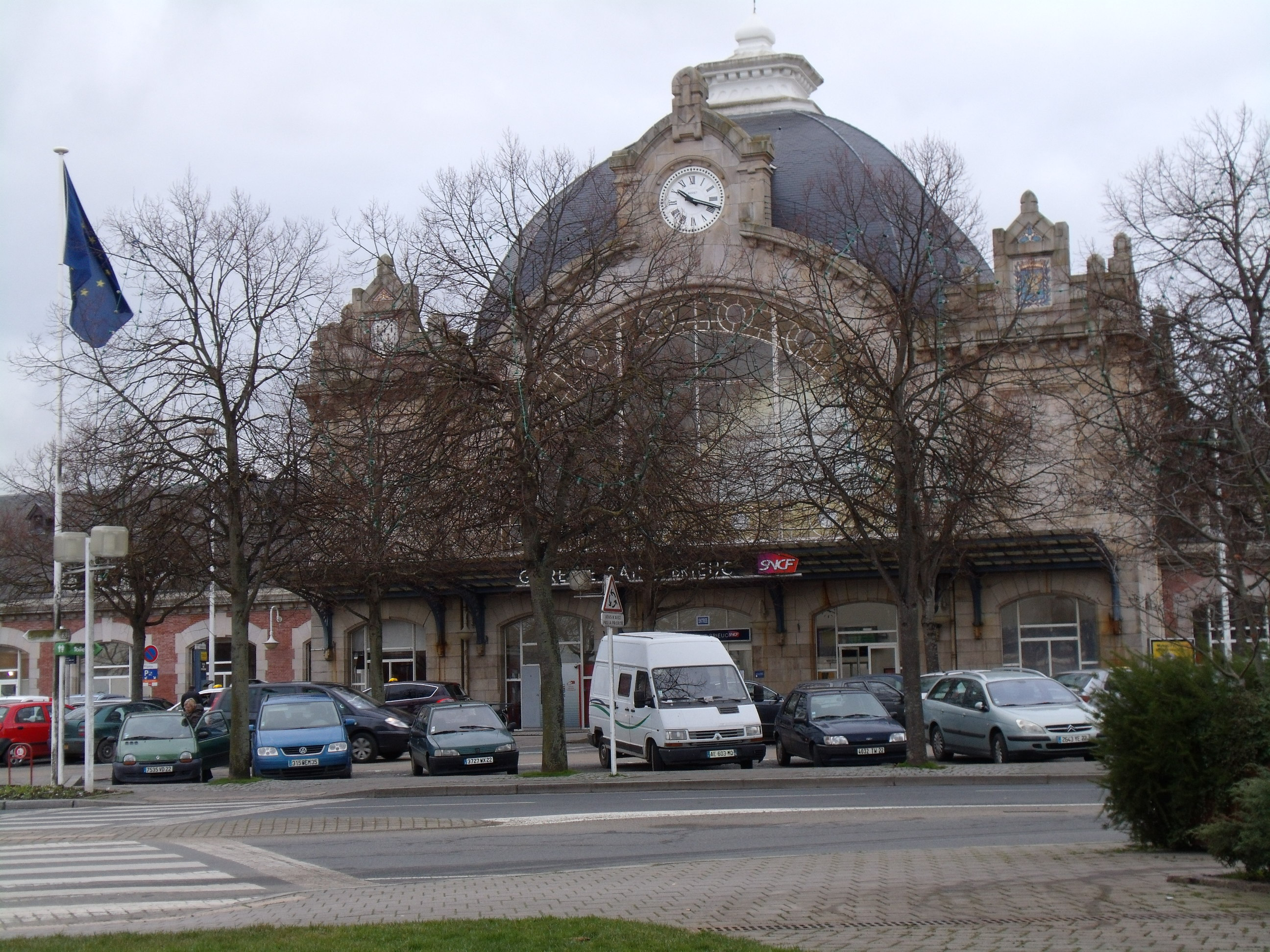
St-Brieuc SNCF station

The Saint-Brieuc railway station, situated on the Paris–Brest railway, is connected by TGV Atlantique to Paris Montparnasse station, with a journey time of about 2 hours 15.

There are no scheduled air services from Saint-Brieuc – Armor Airport.

== Notable people ==
Saint-Brieuc has been the place of residence for many notable people.

- Yann Fouéré (1910–2011), Breton nationalist, journalist and author
- Patrice Carteron (born 1970), footballer
- Octave-Louis Aubert (1870–1950), editor
- Maryvonne Dupureur (1937–2008), athlete, Olympic 800m silver medallist
- Émile Durand (1830–1903), music theorist and teacher
- Léonard Charner (1797–1869), senator and Admiral of France
- Auguste Villiers de l'Isle-Adam (1838–1889), symbolist writer
- Célestin Bouglé (1870–1940), philosopher
- Louis Guilloux (1899–1980), writer
- Patrick Dewaere (1947–1982), actor
- Kévin Théophile-Catherine (born 1989), footballer
- Louis Rossel (1844–1871), Army officer and Communard
- Florent Du Bois de Villerabel (1877–1951), archbishop forced to resign after the Liberation of France in World War II
- Mamadou Wagué (born 1990), footballer
- Raymond Hains (1926–2005), artist
- Anaclet Wamba (born 1960), boxer
- Yelle (Julie Budet) (born 1983), musician
- Roland Fichet (born 1950), author, philosopher
- Jean-Christophe Boullion (born 1969), racing driver
- Alexandre Marsoin (born 1989), racing driver

== Twin towns ==
Saint-Brieuc préfecture of the Côtes-d'Armor is twinned with:

- Aberystwyth, Wales
- Agia Paraskevi, Greece
- Alsdorf, Germany
- Goražde, Bosnia and Herzegovina

== See also ==
- Diocese of Saint-Brieuc
- Communes of the Côtes-d'Armor department
- Élie Le Goff Entry for Élie Le Goff a Saint-Brieuc born sculptor
- The Saint-Michel cemetery in Saint-Brieuc
