= Canton of Trégueux =

Coordinates: 48.49°N 2.74°W

The canton of Trégueux is an administrative division of the Côtes-d'Armor department, northwestern France. It was created at the French canton reorganisation which came into effect in March 2015. Its seat is in Trégueux.

It consists of the following communes:

1. Hillion
2. Langueux
3. Trégueux
4. Yffiniac
