= Trégueux =

Trégueux Tregaeg
- Commune
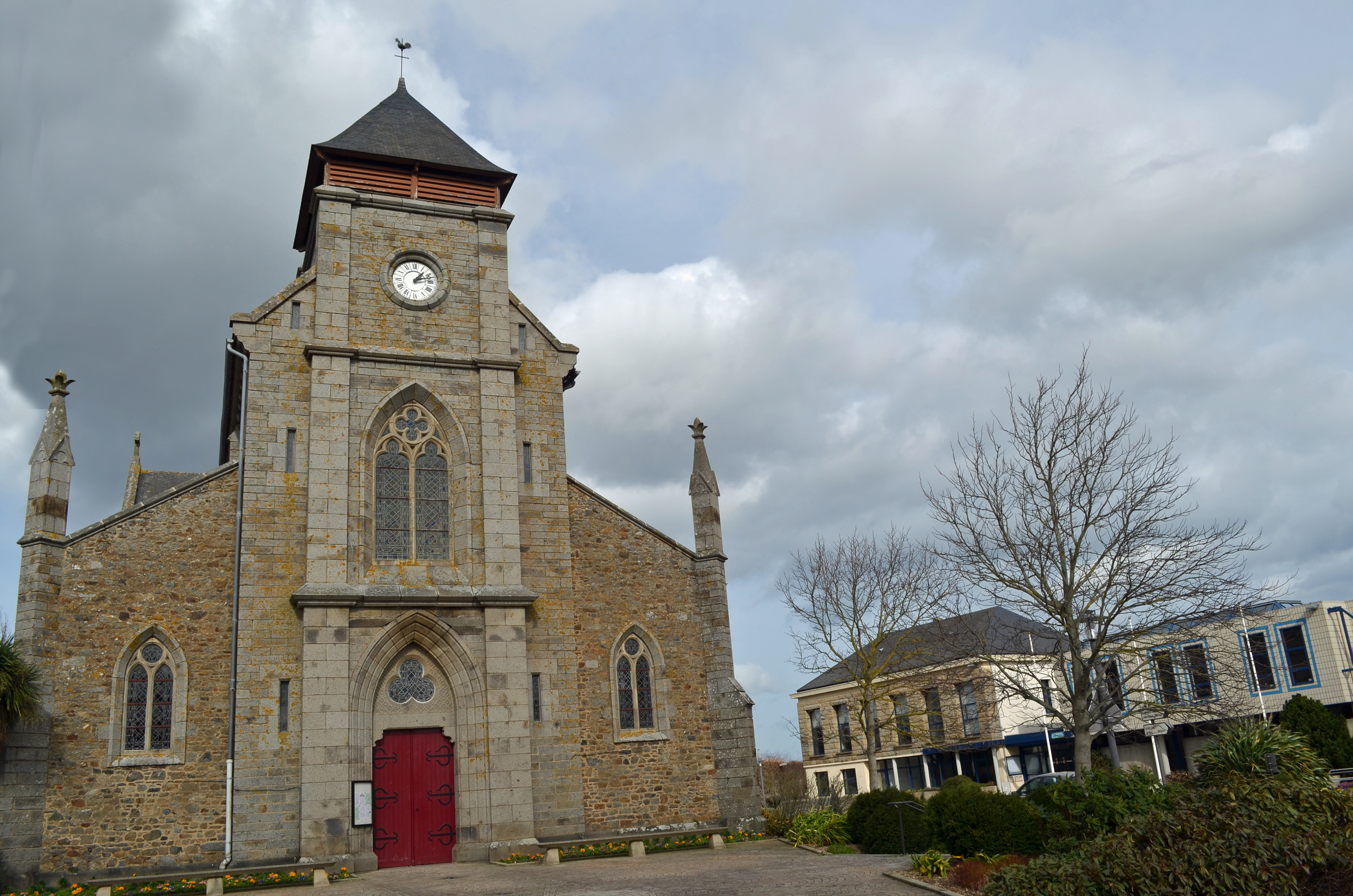
- The church and town hall of Trégueux

- Coat of arms
- Location of Trégueux
- Location within France Location within Brittany
- Coordinates: 48°29′29″N 2°44′11″W
- Country: France
- Region: Brittany
- Department: Côtes-d'Armor
- Arrondissement: Saint-Brieuc
- Canton: Trégueux
- Intercommunality: Saint-Brieuc Armor

Government
  - Mayor (2020–2026): Christine Métois-Le Bras
- Area^{1}: 14.57 km^{2} (5.63 sq mi)
- Highest elevation: 170 m (560 ft)
- Lowest elevation: 20 m (66 ft)
- Population (2023): 8,450
  - Density: 580/km^{2} (1,500/sq mi)
- Time zone: UTC+01:00 (CET)
  - Summer (DST): UTC+02:00 (CEST)
- INSEE/Postal code: 22360 /22950
- ^{1} French Land Register data, which excludes lakes, ponds, glaciers > 1 km^{2} (0.386 sq mi or 247 acres) and river estuaries.

Trégueux (French pronunciation: [tʁeɡø]; Breton: Tregaeg) is a commune in the Côtes-d'Armor department of Brittany in northwestern France.

== Population ==
Inhabitants of Trégueux are called trégueusiens in French.

Historical population
Year	Pop.	±% p.a.
1968	2,182	—
1975	4,704	+11.60%
1982	6,537	+4.81%
1990	6,970	+0.80%
1999	6,581	−0.64%
2007	7,396	+1.47%
2012	8,044	+1.69%
2017	8,432	+0.95%
2023	8,450	+0.04%
Source: INSEE

== Breton language ==
In 2008, 2.7% of primary school children attended bilingual schools.

== See also ==
- Communes of the Côtes-d'Armor department
