= La Harmoye =

La Harmoye Lanhervoed
- Commune
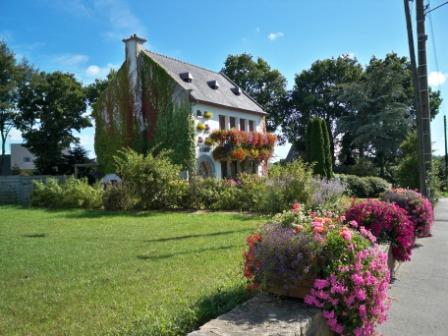
- The town hall of La Harmoye

- Coat of arms
- Location of La Harmoye
- Location within France Location within Brittany
- Coordinates: 48°20′10″N 2°57′36″W
- Country: France
- Region: Brittany
- Department: Côtes-d'Armor
- Arrondissement: Saint-Brieuc
- Canton: Plélo
- Intercommunality: Saint-Brieuc Armor

Government
  - Mayor (2020–2026): Michel Le Duault
- Area^{1}: 17.67 km^{2} (6.82 sq mi)
- Highest elevation: 317 m (1,040 ft)
- Lowest elevation: 175 m (574 ft)
- Population (2023): 386
  - Density: 21.8/km^{2} (56.6/sq mi)
- Time zone: UTC+01:00 (CET)
  - Summer (DST): UTC+02:00 (CEST)
- INSEE/Postal code: 22073 /22320
- ^{1} French Land Register data, which excludes lakes, ponds, glaciers > 1 km^{2} (0.386 sq mi or 247 acres) and river estuaries.

La Harmoye (French pronunciation: [la aʁmwa]; Breton: Lanhervoed; Gallo: Laharmoét) is a commune in the Côtes-d'Armor department of Brittany in northwestern France.

== Population ==
Historical population
Year	Pop.	±% p.a.
1968	555	—
1975	464	−2.53%
1982	424	−1.28%
1990	374	−1.56%
1999	383	+0.26%
2007	418	+1.10%
2012	407	−0.53%
2017	377	−1.52%
2023	386	+0.39%
Source: INSEE

Inhabitants of La Harmoye are called harmoyens in French.

== See also ==
- Communes of the Côtes-d'Armor department
