= Canton of Ploufragan =

Coordinates: 48.49°N 2.79°W

The canton of Ploufragan is an administrative division of the Côtes-d'Armor department, northwestern France. Its borders were not modified at the French canton reorganisation which came into effect in March 2015. Its seat is in Ploufragan.

It consists of the following communes:

1. La Méaugon
2. Plédran
3. Ploufragan
4. Saint-Donan
5. Saint-Julien
