= Alphonse Guépin =

French architect

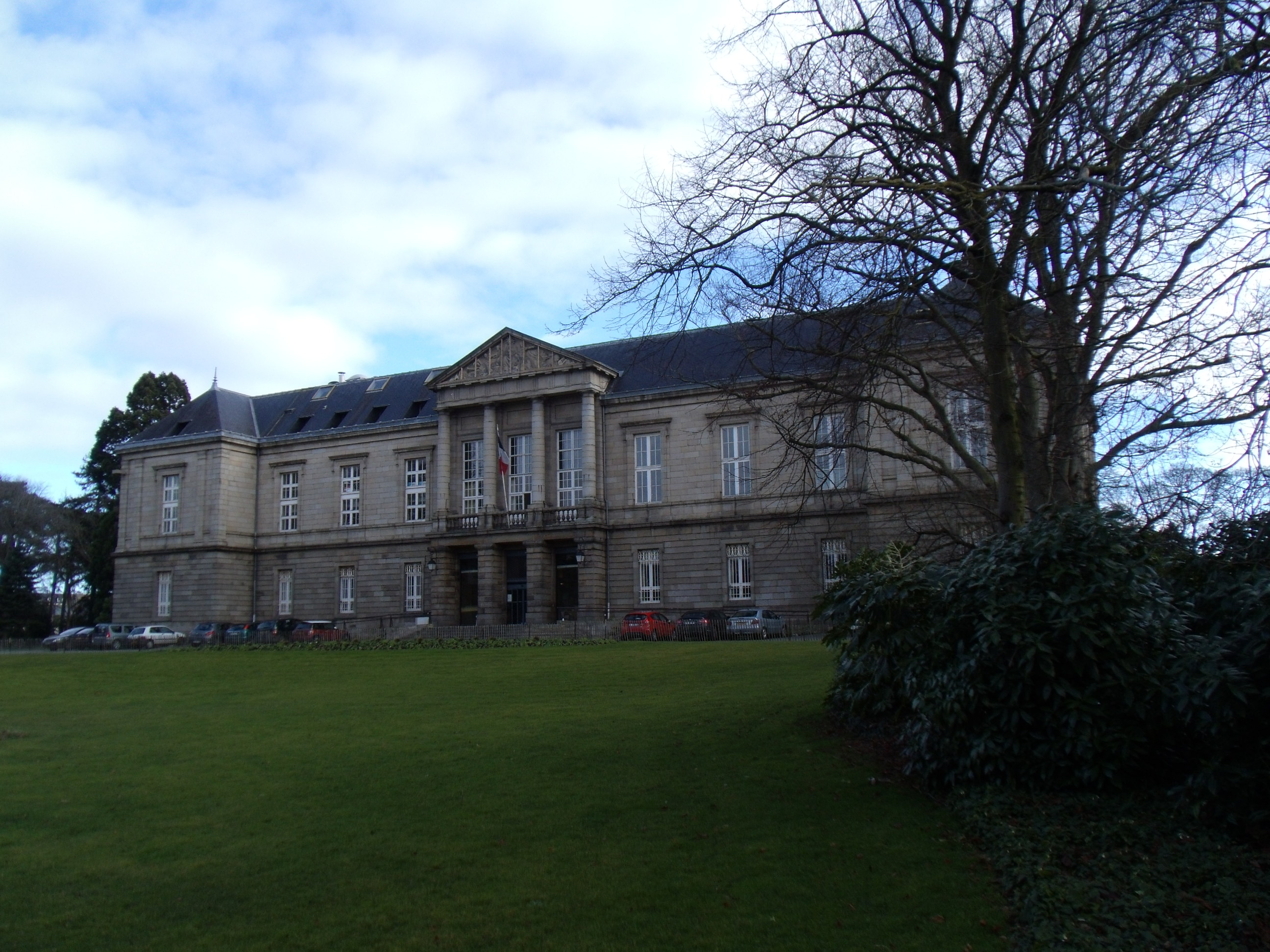
The tribunal in Saint-Brieuc

Alphonse Guépin (17 February 1808 in Uzel – 8 December 1878 in Saint-Brieuc) was a French architect and building restorer.

He was specialized in churches in Côtes-d'Armor.

- Saint-Pierre church in Plessala
- Saint-Gwénaël church in Lescouët-Gouarec
- Church in Plouézec
- Church in Lanrivain
- Anatole-le-Braz school in Saint-Brieuc

His main building was the Court in Saint-Brieuc, built in 1863.
