= Langueux =

Langueux Langaeg
- Commune
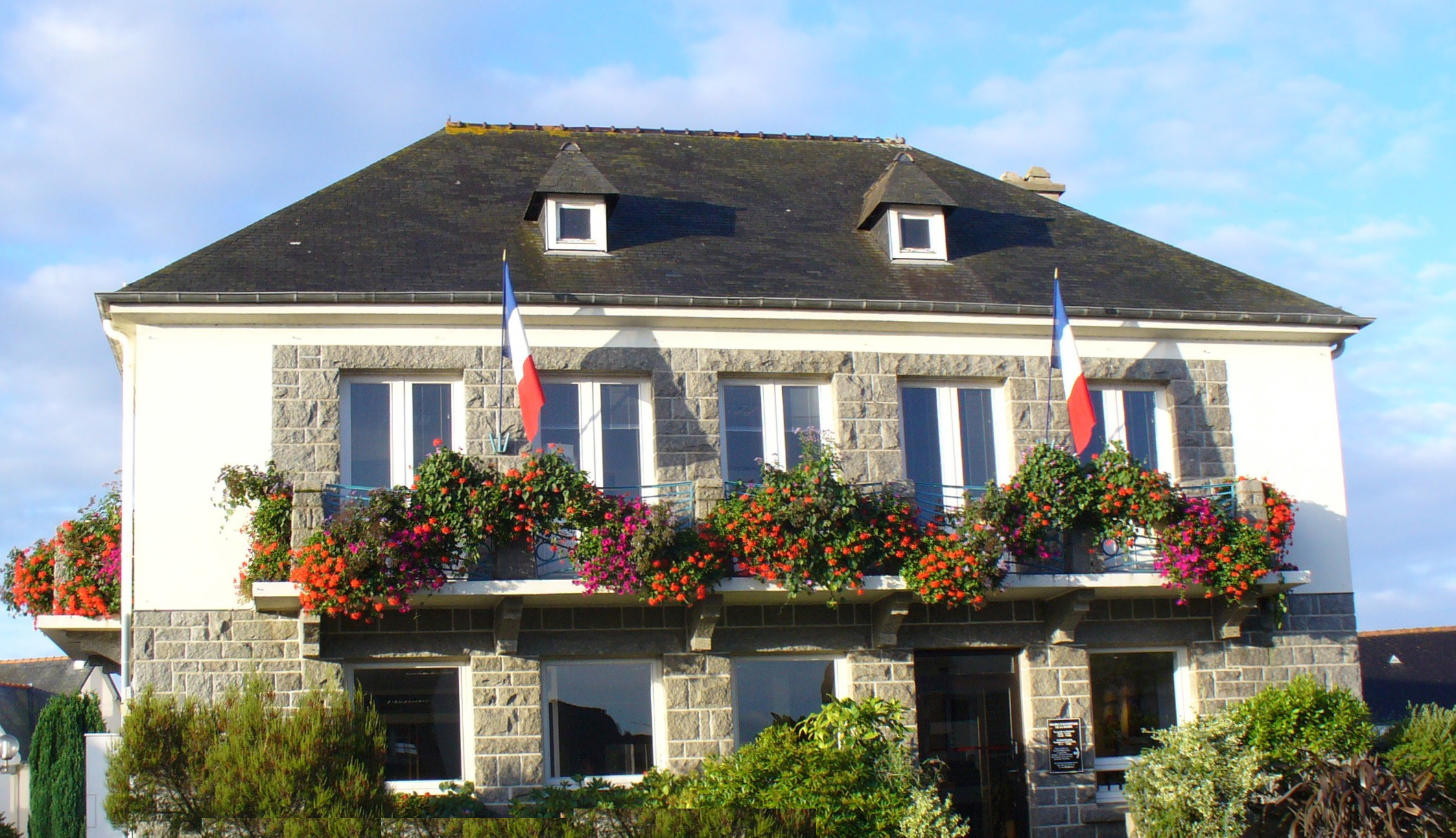
- Town hall
- Location of Langueux
- Location within France Location within Brittany
- Coordinates: 48°29′45″N 2°42′58″W
- Country: France
- Region: Brittany
- Department: Côtes-d'Armor
- Arrondissement: Saint-Brieuc
- Canton: Trégueux
- Intercommunality: Saint-Brieuc Armor

Government
  - Mayor (2020–2026): Richard Haas
- Area^{1}: 9.10 km^{2} (3.51 sq mi)
- Highest elevation: 107 m (351 ft)
- Lowest elevation: 2 m (6.6 ft)
- Population (2023): 7,939
  - Density: 872/km^{2} (2,260/sq mi)
- Time zone: UTC+01:00 (CET)
  - Summer (DST): UTC+02:00 (CEST)
- INSEE/Postal code: 22106 /22360
- ^{1} French Land Register data, which excludes lakes, ponds, glaciers > 1 km^{2} (0.386 sq mi or 247 acres) and river estuaries.

Langueux (French pronunciation: [lɑ̃gø]; Breton: Langaeg) is a commune in the Côtes-d'Armor department of Brittany in northwestern France.

== Population ==
Inhabitants of Langueux are called langueusiens in French.

Historical population

Year	Pop.	±% p.a.
1793	1,280	—
1800	1,278	−0.02%
1806	1,311	+0.43%
1821	1,781	+2.06%
1831	2,000	+1.17%
1836	1,962	−0.38%
1841	2,120	+1.56%
1846	2,236	+1.07%
1851	2,329	+0.82%
1856	2,420	+0.77%
1861	2,638	+1.74%
1866	2,747	+0.81%
1872	2,795	+0.29%
1876	2,893	+0.87%
1881	2,900	+0.05%
1886	2,855	−0.31%
1891	2,940	+0.59%
1896	2,808	−0.91%
1901	2,685	−0.89%

Year	Pop.	±% p.a.
1906	2,401	−2.21%
1911	2,424	+0.19%
1921	2,204	−0.95%
1926	2,253	+0.44%
1931	2,274	+0.19%
1936	2,294	+0.18%
1946	2,201	−0.41%
1954	2,342	+0.78%
1962	2,584	+1.24%
1968	2,951	+2.24%
1975	3,838	+3.83%
1982	4,767	+3.15%
1990	5,938	+2.78%
1999	6,248	+0.57%
2007	6,907	+1.26%
2012	7,275	+1.04%
2017	7,692	+1.12%
2023	7,939	+0.53%

Source: EHESS and INSEE (1968-2023)

== See also ==
- Communes of the Côtes-d'Armor department
