= La Méaugon =

La Méaugon Lanvealgon
- Commune
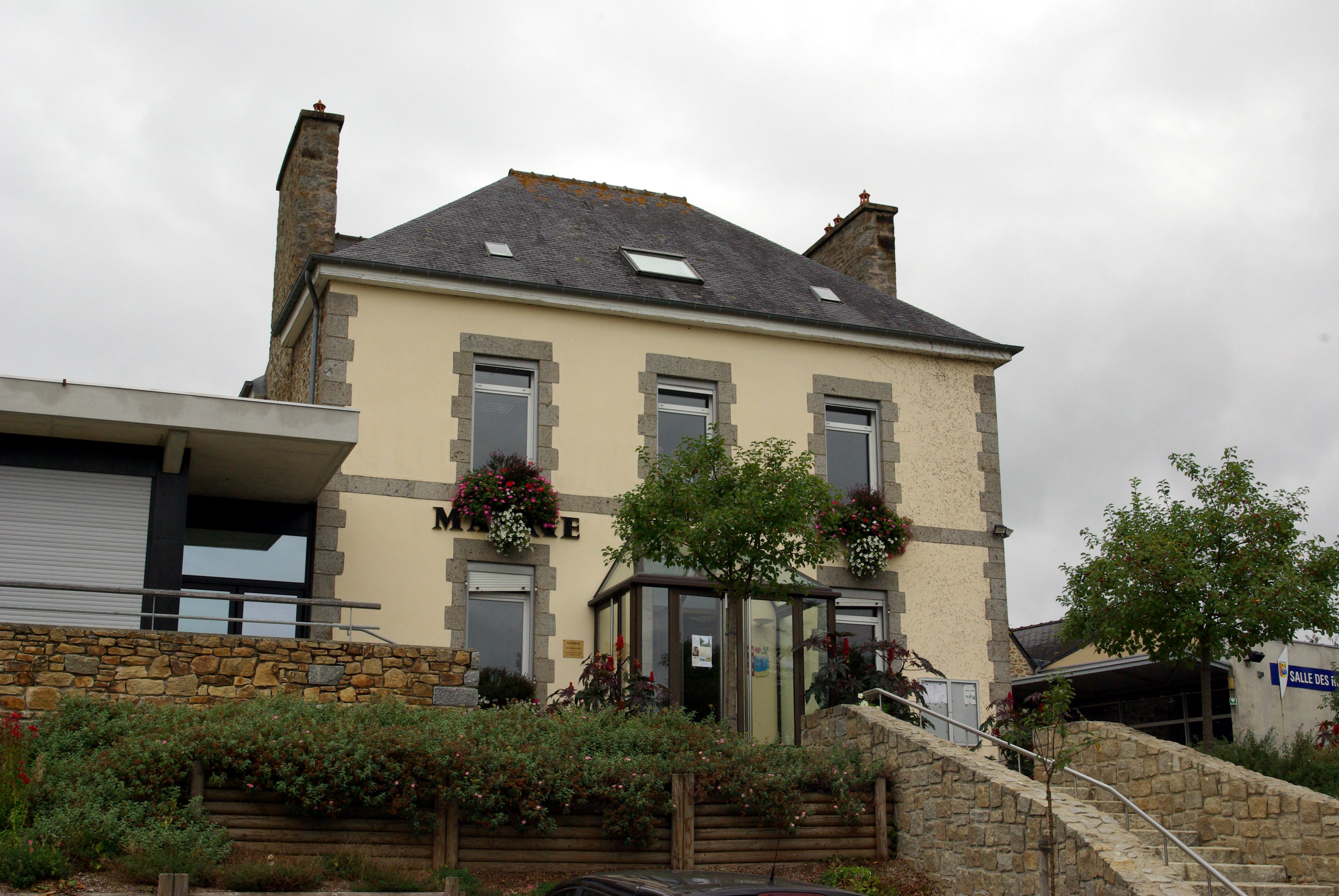
- Town hall

- Coat of arms
- Location of La Méaugon
- Location within France Location within Brittany
- Coordinates: 48°29′58″N 2°50′14″W
- Country: France
- Region: Brittany
- Department: Côtes-d'Armor
- Arrondissement: Saint-Brieuc
- Canton: Ploufragan
- Intercommunality: Saint-Brieuc Armor

Government
  - Mayor (2020–2026): Jean-Marc Labbé
- Area^{1}: 6.78 km^{2} (2.62 sq mi)
- Highest elevation: 155 m (509 ft)
- Lowest elevation: 39 m (128 ft)
- Population (2023): 1,320
  - Density: 195/km^{2} (504/sq mi)
- Time zone: UTC+01:00 (CET)
  - Summer (DST): UTC+02:00 (CEST)
- INSEE/Postal code: 22144 /22440
- ^{1} French Land Register data, which excludes lakes, ponds, glaciers > 1 km^{2} (0.386 sq mi or 247 acres) and river estuaries.

La Méaugon (French pronunciation: [la meoɡɔ̃]; Breton: Lanvealgon; Gallo: Laméaugon) is a commune in the Côtes-d'Armor department of Brittany in northwestern France.

== Population ==
Historical population
Year	Pop.	±% p.a.
1968	550	—
1975	572	+0.56%
1982	785	+4.63%
1990	993	+2.98%
1999	1,122	+1.37%
2007	1,276	+1.62%
2012	1,295	+0.30%
2017	1,292	−0.05%
2023	1,320	+0.36%
Source: INSEE

Inhabitants of La Méaugon are called méaugonnais in French.

== See also ==
- Communes of the Côtes-d'Armor department
