= Côtes-d'Armor =

Department of France

Côtes-d'Armor Côtes d'Ahaot (Gallo) Aodoù-an-Arvor (Breton)
- Department
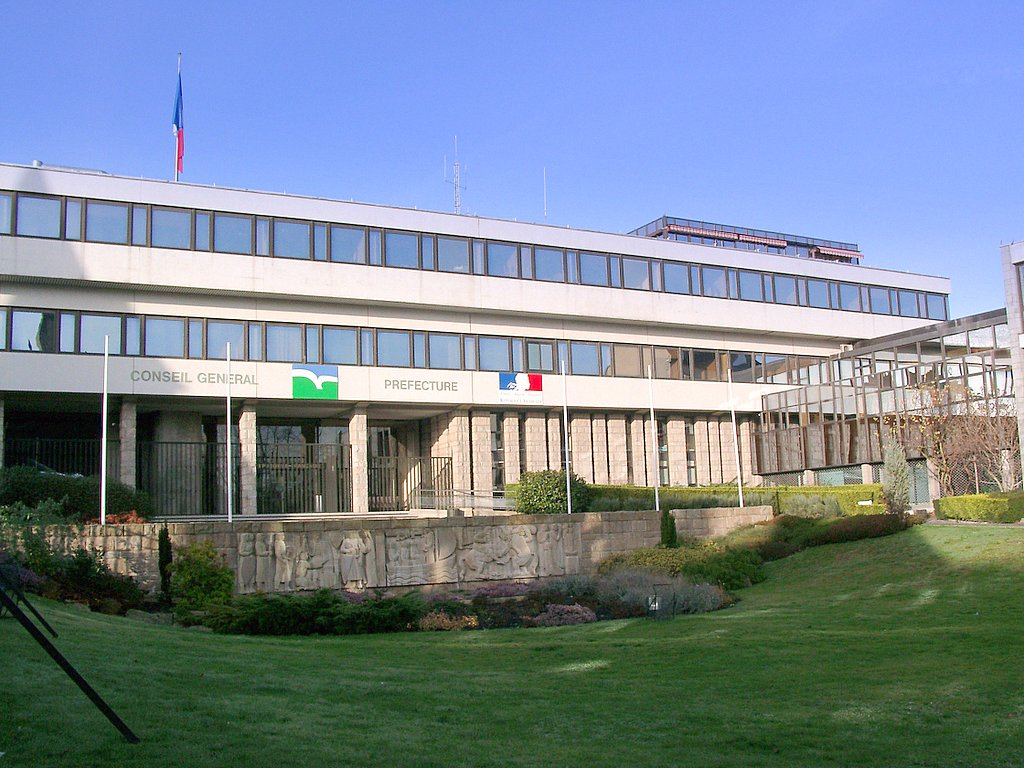
- The departmental council and prefectural building in Saint-Brieuc.

- Flag Coat of arms

- Location of Côtes-d'Armor in France
- Coordinates: 48°20′N 02°50′W
- Country: France
- Region: Brittany
- Prefecture: Saint-Brieuc
- Subprefectures: Dinan; Guingamp; Lannion

Government
  - President of the departmental council: Christian Coail (PS)

Area^{1}
  - Total: 6,878 km^{2} (2,656 sq mi)

Population (2023)
  - Total: 611,859
  - Rank: 42nd
  - Density: 88.96/km^{2} (230.4/sq mi)
- Time zone: UTC+1 (CET)
  - Summer (DST): UTC+2 (CEST)
- Department number: 22
- Arrondissements: 4
- Cantons: 27
- Communes: 344
- ^1 French Land Register data, which exclude estuaries, and lakes, ponds, and glaciers larger than 1 km^{2}

The Côtes-d'Armor (/koʊt dɑːrmər/ koht dar-mər, /-dɑːrmɔːr/ -dar-mor; French pronunciation: [kot daʁmɔʁ]; Gallo: Côtes d'Ahaot, Breton: Aodoù-an-Arvor, [ˈoːdu ãn ˈarvor]), formerly known as Côtes-du-Nord until 1990 (Breton: Aodoù-an-Hanternoz, [ˈoːdu ãn ˌhãntɛrˈnoːs]), is a department in the north of Brittany, in northwestern France. In 2023, it had a population of 611,859.

== History ==
=== French Revolution ===
Côtes-du-Nord was one of the original 83 departments created on 4 March 1790 following the French Revolution. It was made up from the near entirety of the ancient Pays de Saint-Brieuc, most of historical Trégor, the eastern half of Cornouaille, and the north-western part of the former diocese of Saint-Malo. The area had been part of the Province of Brittany before 1790.

=== World War II ===
During the Second World War, Côtes-d'Armor was occupied by the Nazis and was the site of French Resistance operations, such as Operation Samwest, around the time of the Normandy landings.

=== Post-War ===
On 27 February 1990, the name was changed to Côtes-d'Armor; the name is a portmanteau of the French word côtes means "coasts" and ar mor is "the sea" in Breton. The name also recalls that of the Roman province of Armorica ("the coastal region").

== Geography ==
Côtes-d'Armor is part of the current administrative region of Brittany and is bounded by the departments of Ille-et-Vilaine to the east, Morbihan to the south, and Finistère to the west, and by the English Channel to the north.

The region is an undulating plateau including three well-marked ranges of hills in the south. A granitoid chain, the Monts du Méné, starting in the south-east of the department runs in a north-westerly direction, forming the watershed between the rivers running respectively to the English Channel and the Atlantic Ocean. Towards its western extremity this chain bifurcates to form the Montagnes Noires in the south-west and the Monts d'Arrée in the west of the department. Off the coast, which is steep, rocky and much indented, are the Jentilez, Bréhat and other small islands. The principal bays are those of Saint-Malo and Saint-Brieuc.

=== Principal towns ===
The most populous commune is Saint-Brieuc, the prefecture. As of 2023, there are 6 communes with more than 10,000 inhabitants:

Commune	Population (2023)
Saint-Brieuc	44,364
Lannion	20,315
Lamballe-Armor	17,241
Dinan	14,764
Plérin	14,425
Ploufragan	11,507

== Demographics ==
The inhabitants of the department are known in French as Costarmoricains.

Historical population

Year	Pop.	±% p.a.
1801	504,303	—
1821	552,424	+0.46%
1831	598,872	+0.81%
1841	607,572	+0.14%
1851	632,613	+0.40%
1861	628,676	−0.06%
1876	630,957	+0.02%
1881	627,585	−0.11%
1891	618,652	−0.14%
1901	609,349	−0.15%
1921	557,824	−0.44%
1936	532,000	−0.32%

Year	Pop.	±% p.a.
1946	526,955	−0.10%
1954	503,178	−0.58%
1962	501,923	−0.03%
1968	506,102	+0.14%
1975	525,556	+0.54%
1982	538,869	+0.36%
1990	538,395	−0.01%
1999	542,373	+0.08%
2007	576,049	+0.76%
2012	595,531	+0.67%
2017	598,814	+0.11%
2023	611,859	+0.36%

== Politics ==
Côtes-d'Armor's long tradition of anti-clericalism, especially in the interior around Guingamp (a former Communist stronghold), has often led to the department's being seen as an area of left-wing exceptionalism in a region that historically was otherwise strongly Catholic and right-wing. The current president of the departmental council, Christian Coail, is a member of the Socialist Party.

Party groupings	seats
Centre et droite républicaine	32
Socialiste et républicain	15
Communiste et républicain	5
non-party	2

=== Current National Assembly Representatives ===
Constituency	Member	Party
Côtes-d'Armor's 1st constituency	Mickaël Cosson	MoDem
Côtes-d'Armor's 2nd constituency	Hervé Berville	Renaissance
Côtes-d'Armor's 3rd constituency	Corentin Le Fur	The Republicans
Côtes-d'Armor's 4th constituency	Murielle Lepvraud	La France insoumise
Côtes-d'Armor's 5th constituency	Éric Bothorel	Renaissance

== Culture ==
The western part of the department is part of the traditionally Breton-speaking "Lower Brittany" (Breizh-Izel in Breton). The boundary runs from Plouha to Mûr-de-Bretagne. The Breton language has become an intense issue in many parts of Brittany, and many Breton-speakers advocate for bilingual schools. Gallo is also spoken in the east and is offered as a language in the schools and on the baccalaureat exams.

== Gallery ==
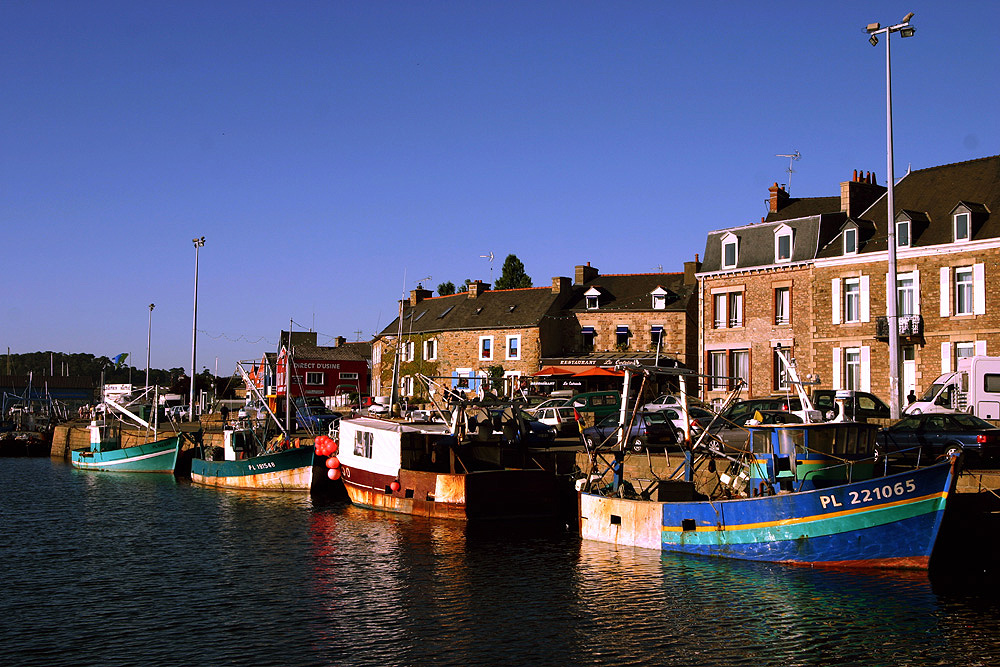
Paimpol

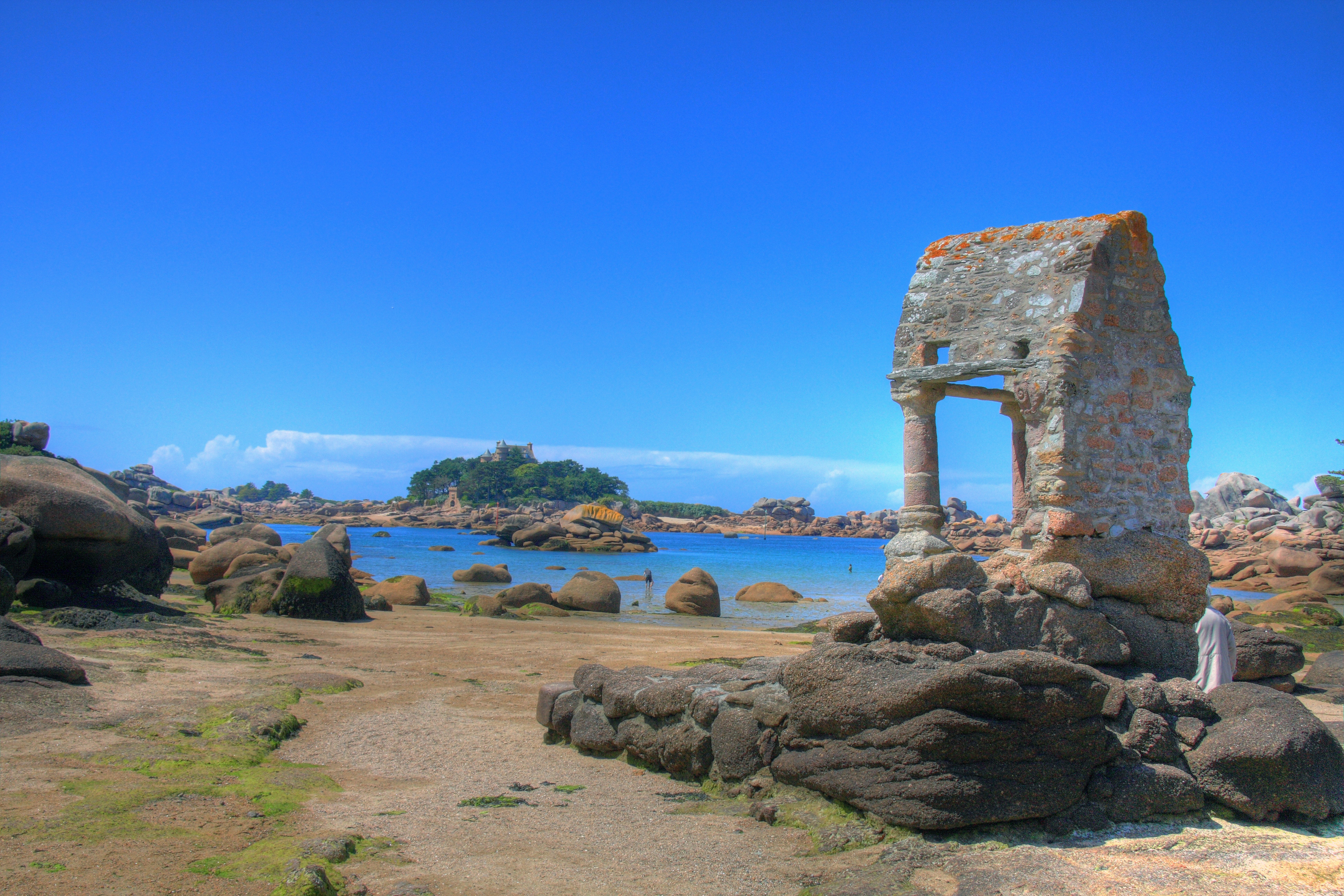
Perros-Guirec

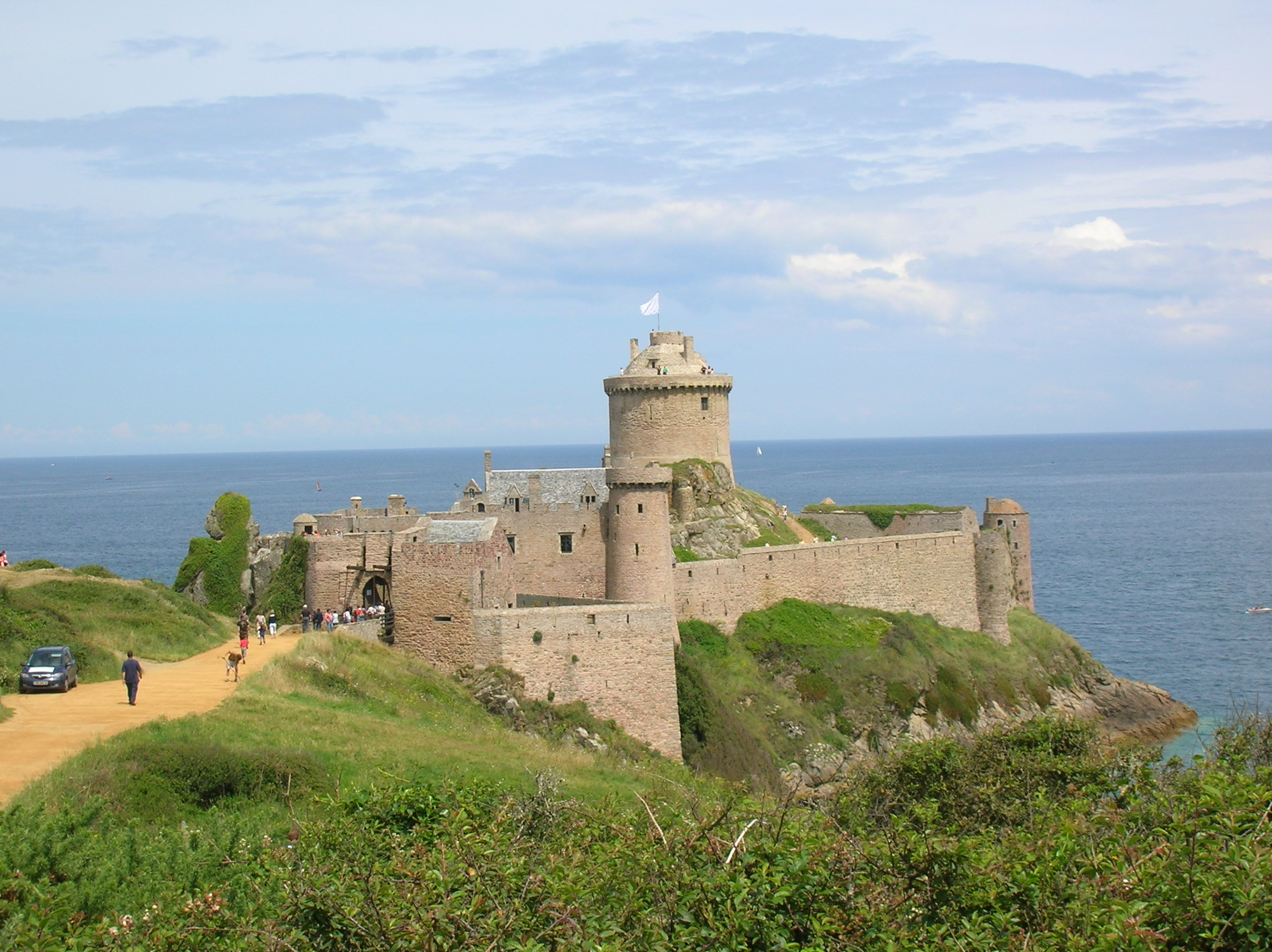
Fort-la-Latte

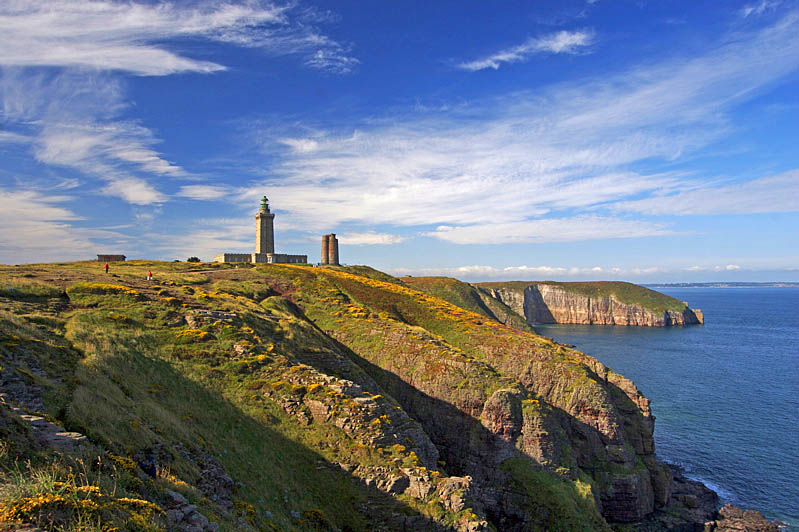
Cap Fréhel

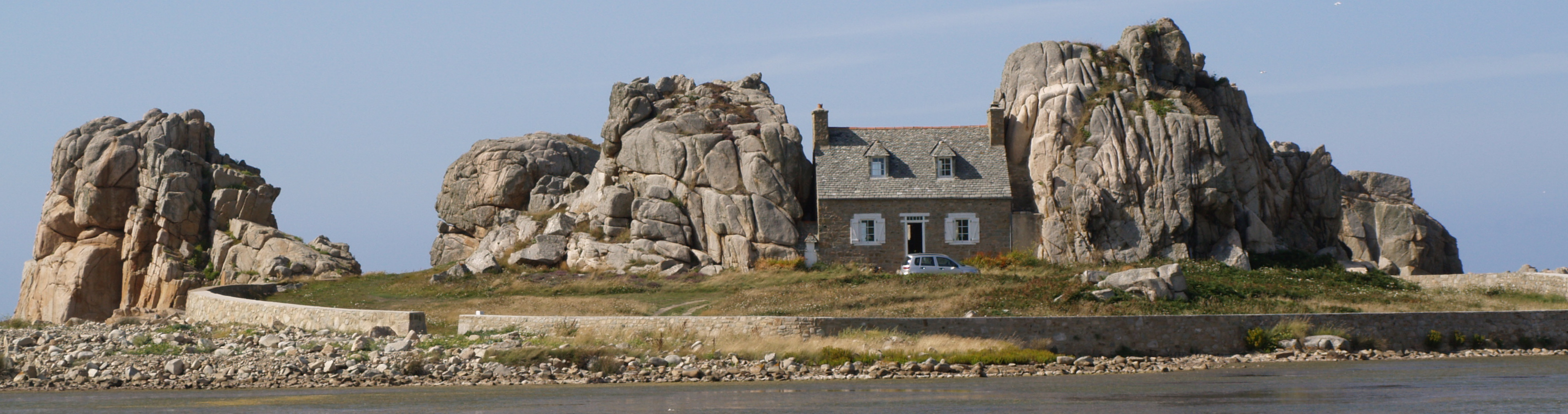
Castel Meur house in Plougrescant

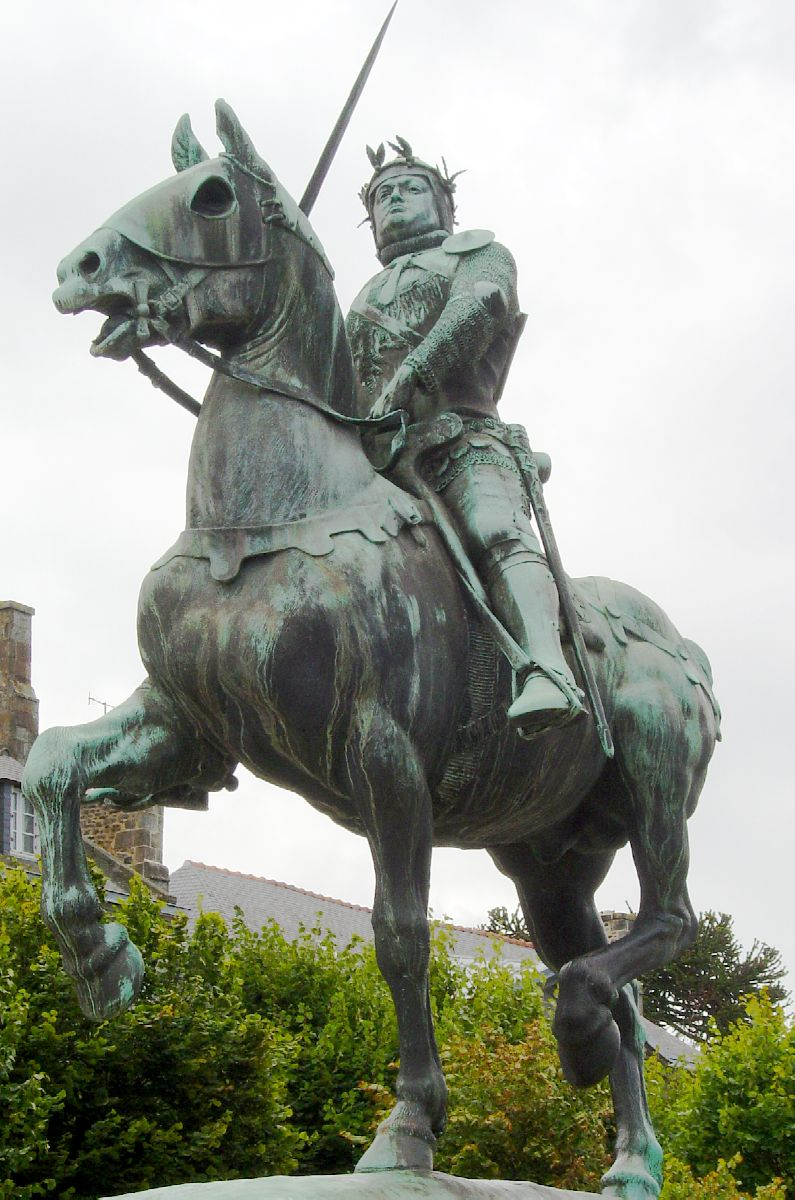
Statue of Bertrand du Guesclin in Dinan

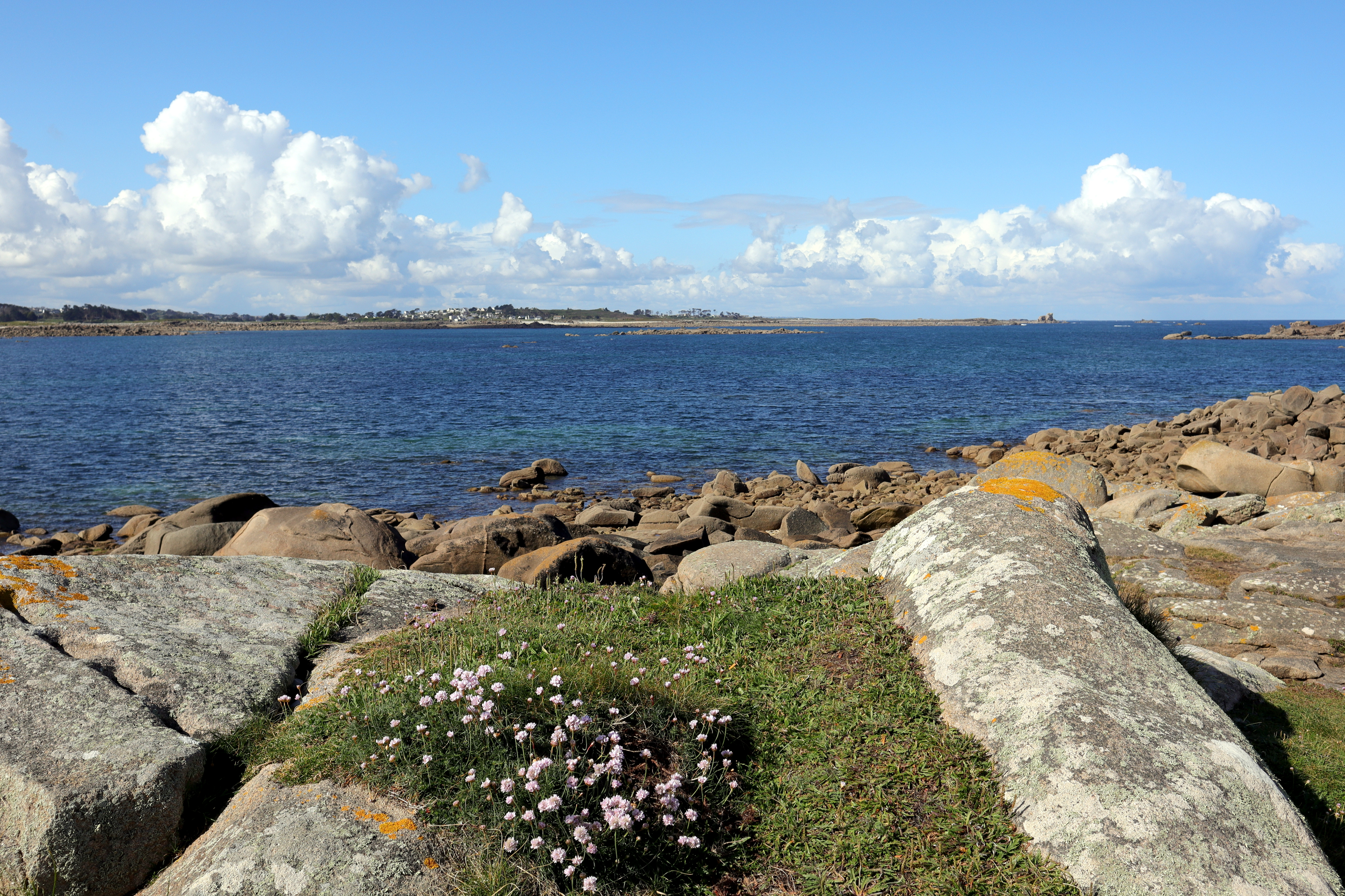
Seen from a hiking trail

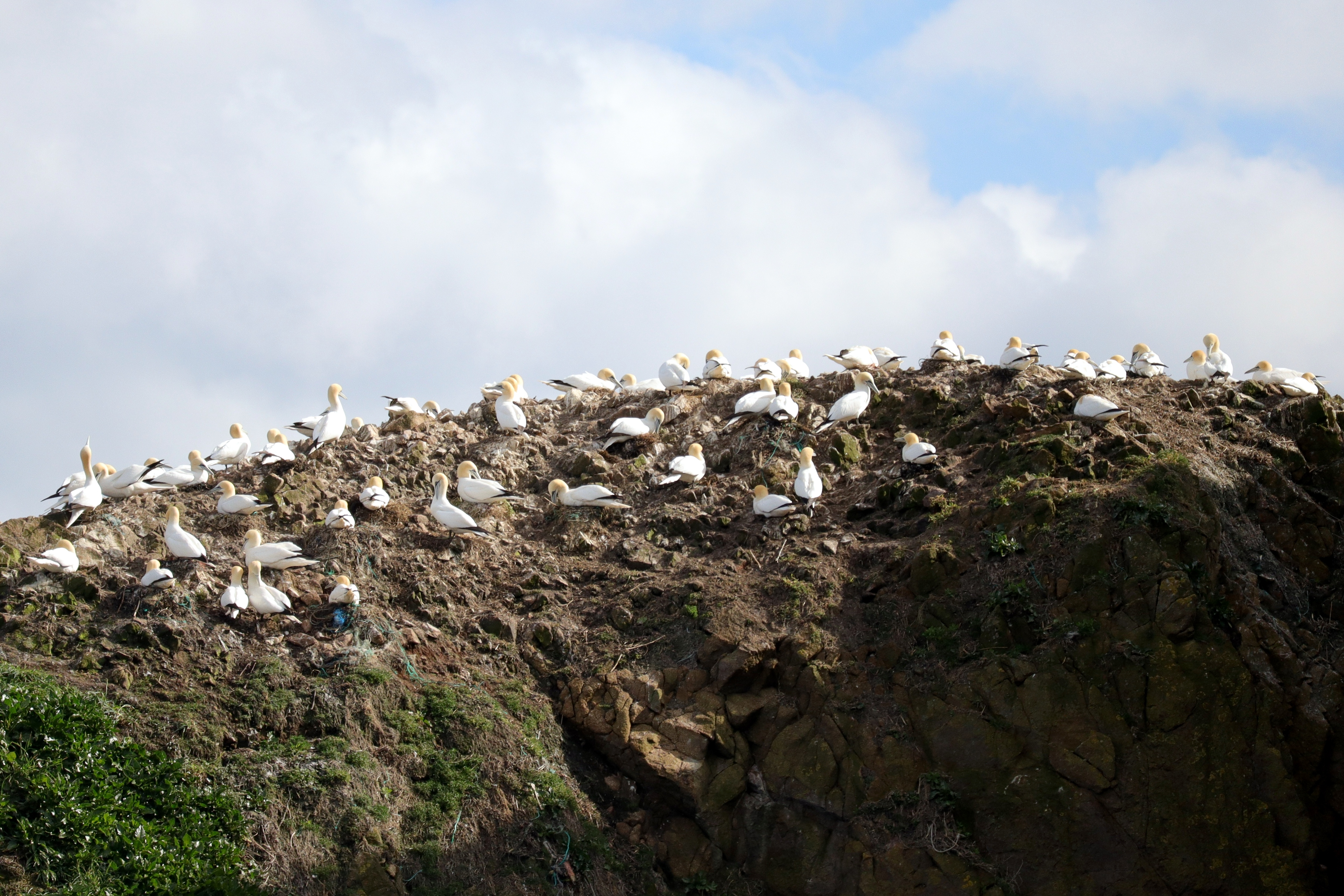
Gannets on Rouzic Island

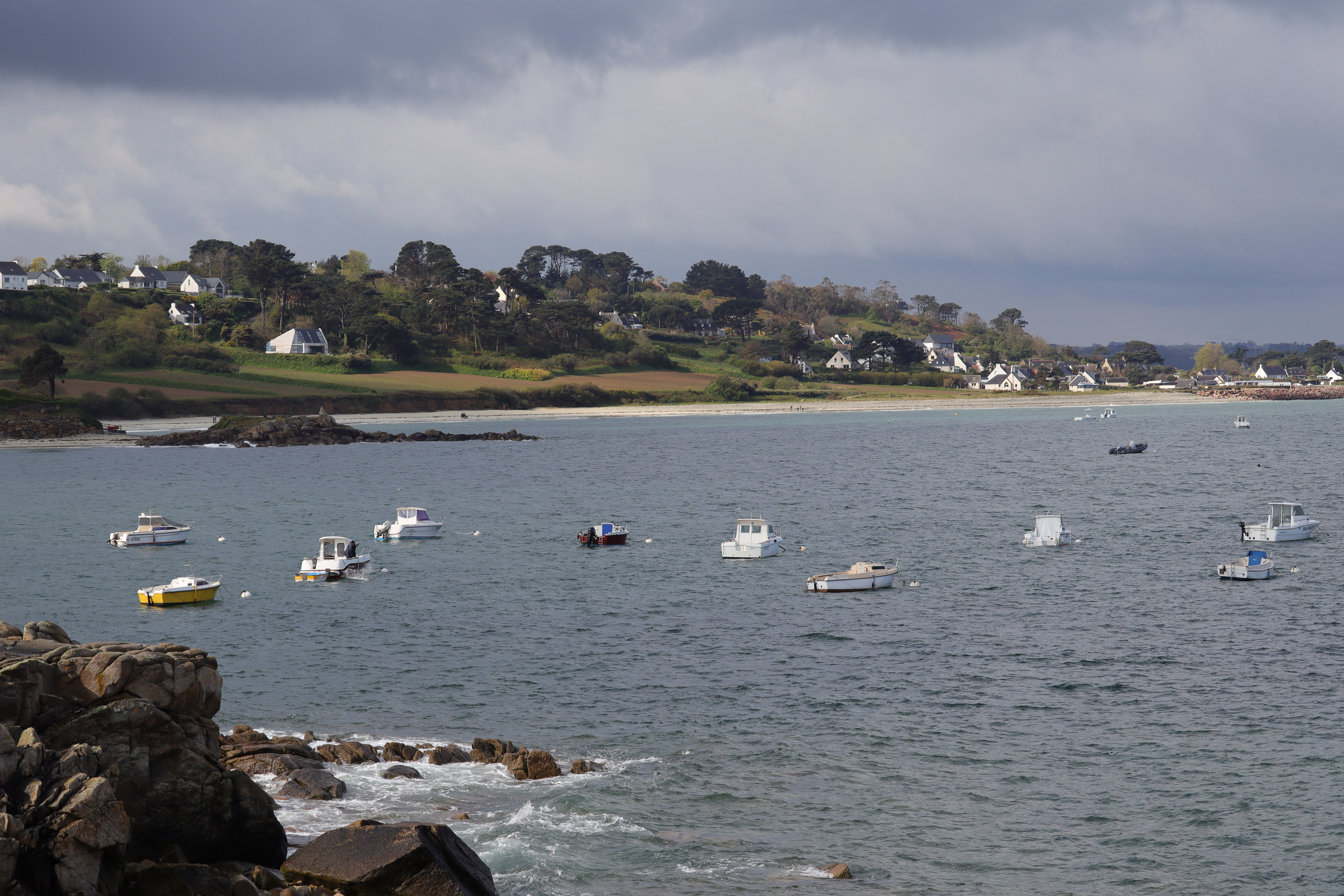
Small harbour at high tide

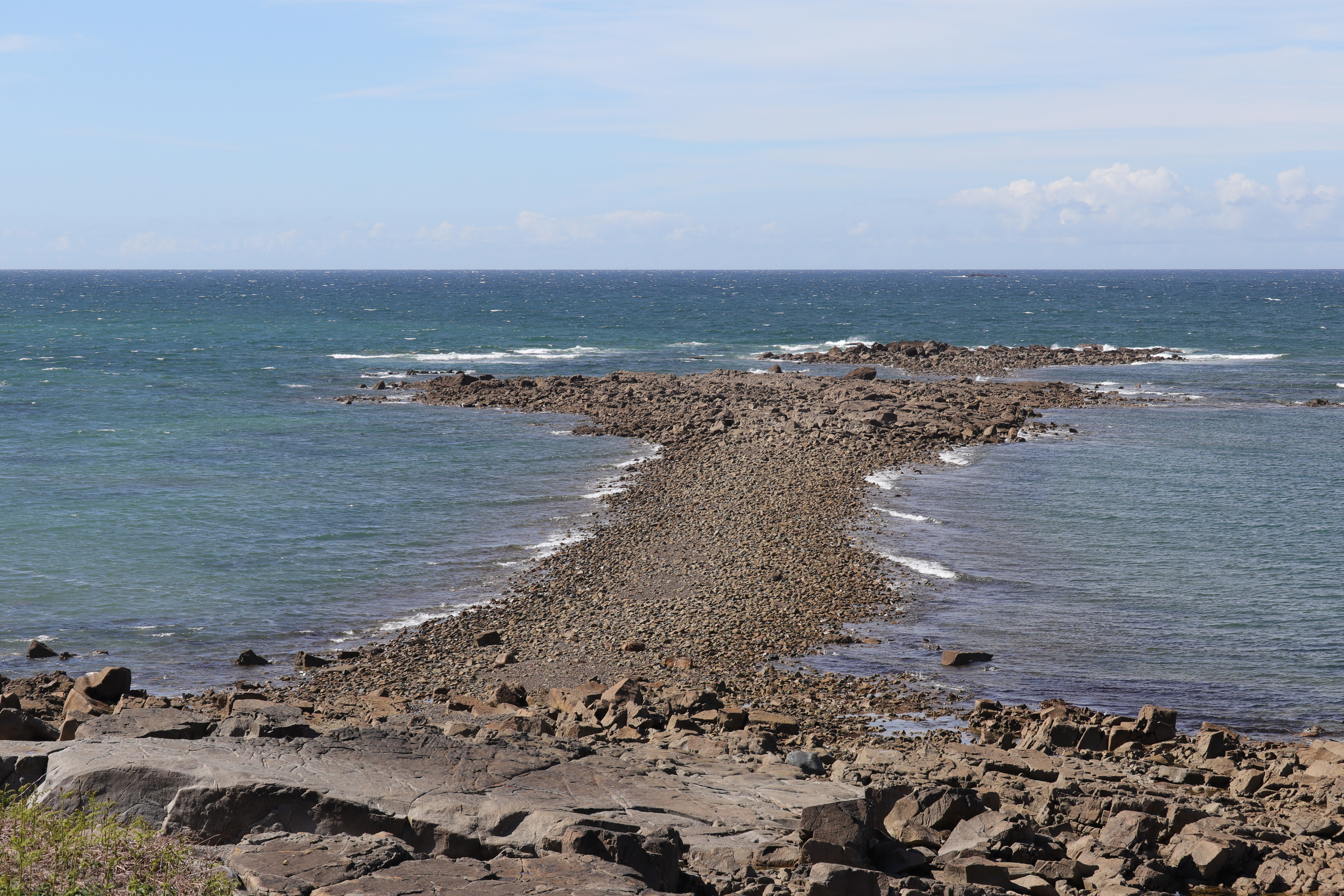
The coast

== Notable people ==
- Anne Beaumanoir (1923–2022), one of the Righteous Among the Nations, was born in Guildo.
- Marc-François Carré (1713–1758), the ancestor of actor and comedian Jim Carrey.
- Bernadette Cattanéo (1899–1963), trade unionist and militant communist
- English-born poet Robert William Service (1874–1958), known as the "Bard of the Yukon", is buried in Lancieux.

== See also ==
- Cantons of the Côtes-d'Armor department
- Communes of the Côtes-d'Armor department
- Arrondissements of the Côtes-d'Armor department
- Chemin de fer des Côtes-du-Nord, former railway in this region
