= Agriculture in France =

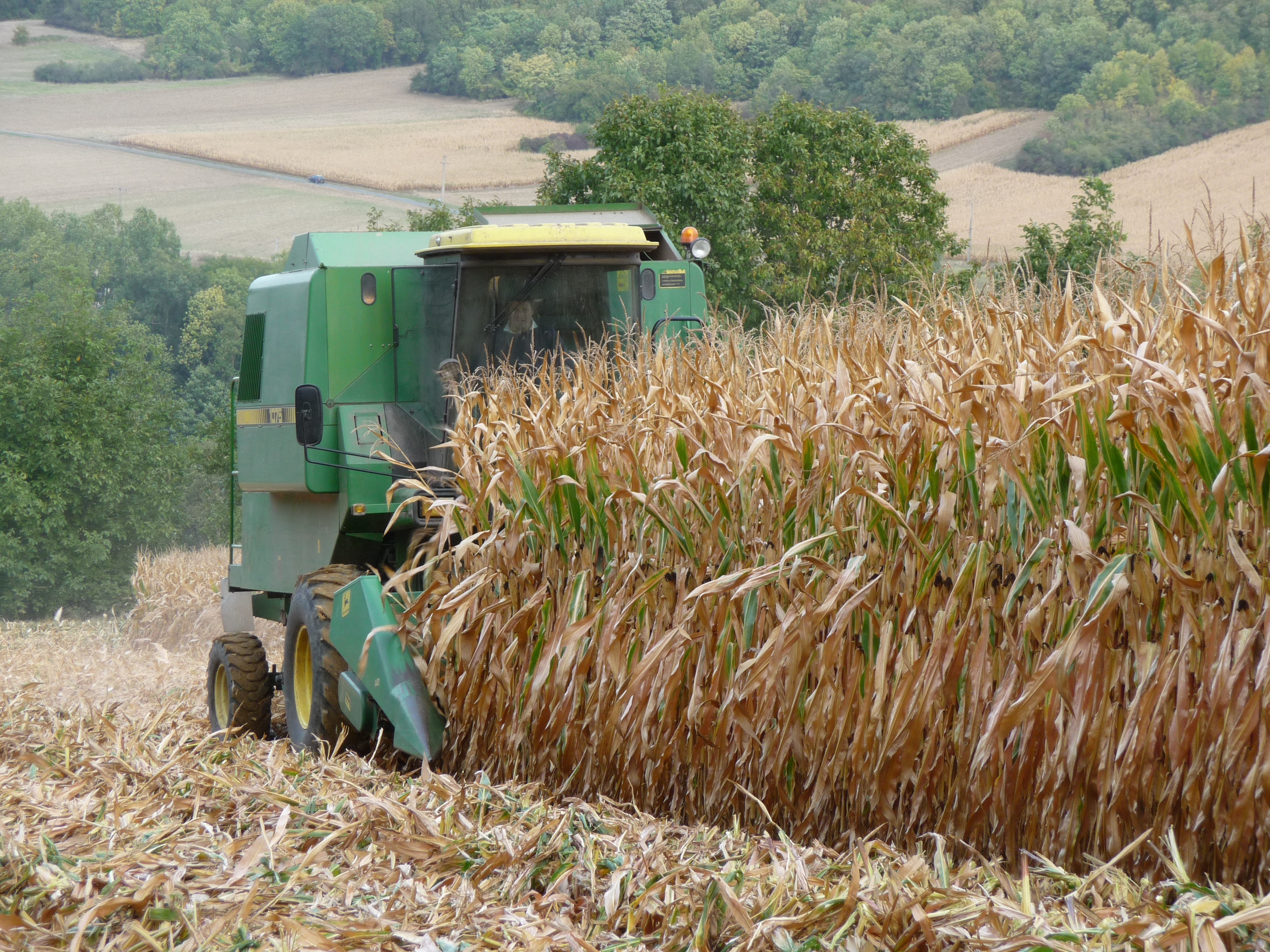
Corn harvesting in the Yvelines department

France is the largest producer of agricultural products in Europe (accounting for 18% of total production in the European Union). Favorable agro-climatic conditions contribute to this status. The country ranks among the top five exporters of agricultural products. Agriculture accounts for approximately 2% of GDP, while the agro-industrial complex accounts for more than 4%.

== Statistics ==
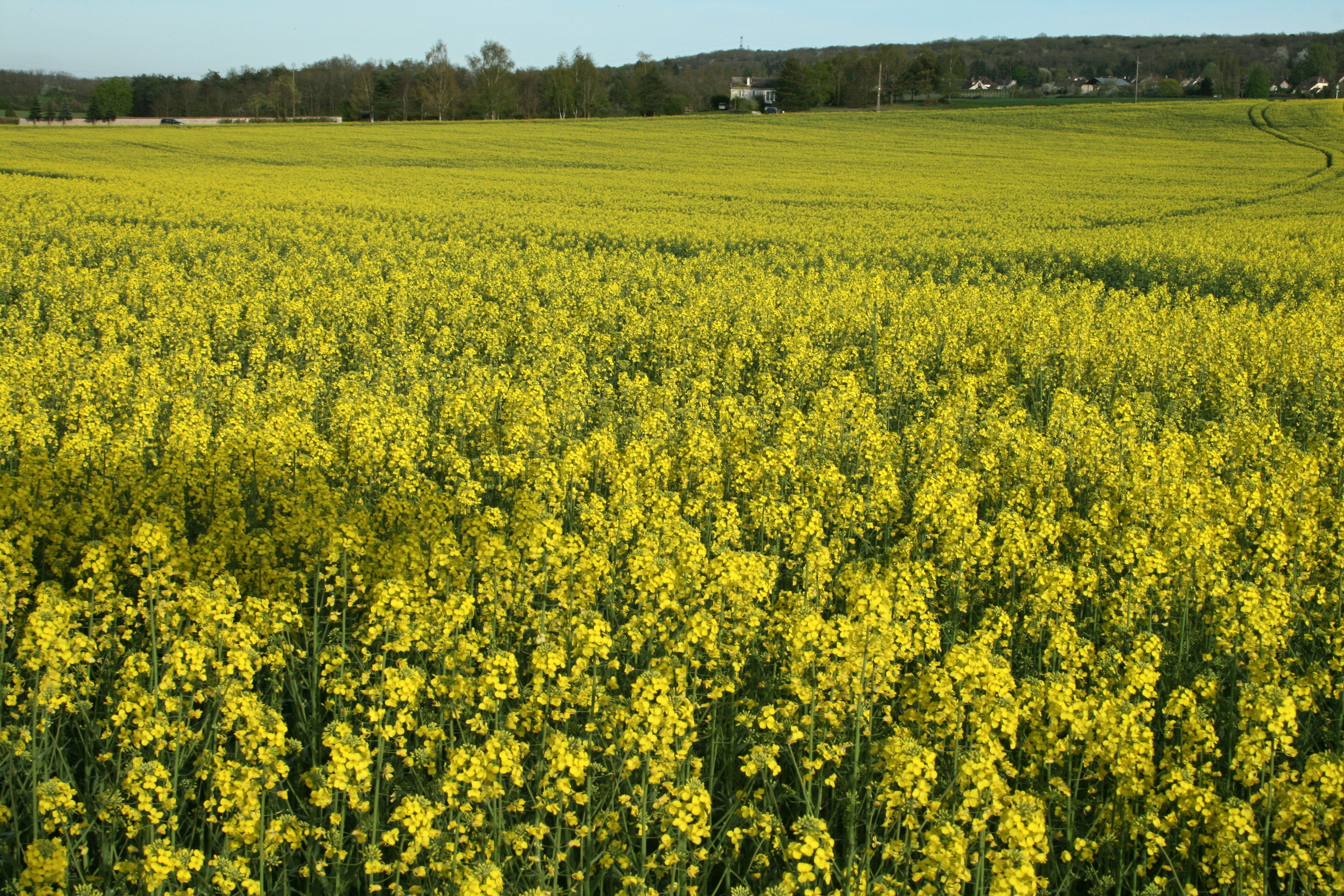
Rapeseed field in the Seine-et-Marne department

As of 2019, the area of agricultural land was estimated at 28.6 million hectares (52.6% of the country's territory), including arable land (18.1 million hectares or 33.4%), permanent crops (1 million hectares or 1.8%), and pastures (9.5 million hectares or 17.5%). Forests account for 29.2% of the country's territory. The number of farms has been steadily declining; while there were 2 million farms in the 1950s, only 700,000 remained by the end of the 1990s. According to 2020 census data, there were 416,500 farms in France, with an average size of 69 hectares. Large farms (with an annual turnover exceeding €250,000) accounted for 20% of the total, while micro-farms (under €25,000) accounted for 30%. Farms employed 524,000 managers and 758,000 hired workers. As of 2023, France ranked among the top ten countries globally in the production of the following agricultural products: hemp (1st place), grapes (3rd), duck meat (3rd), barley (3rd), rabbit meat (4th), fresh peas (4th), sugar beets (4th), beans (5th), turkey meat (5th), goat milk (5th), gooseberries (5th), rapeseed (5th), dried peas (6th), wheat (6th), sunflower seeds (6th), apricots (8th), hazelnuts (8th), potatoes (8th), kiwifruit (8th), cow milk (8th), asparagus (8th), mushrooms (9th), flaxseed (9th), pork (9th), apples (9th), beef (10th), and lupin (10th).

In 2023, France held leading global positions in the export of the following agro-industrial products (by volume): fresh peas (1st), hemp seed (1st), cattle (1st), flax (1st), hemp fiber (1st), malt (1st), baking mixes and dough (1st), chicory (1st), grapes (2nd), glucose and dextrose (2nd), mustard powder (2nd), baby food (2nd), yogurt with additives (2nd), potatoes (2nd), pet food (2nd), buttermilk (2nd), processed cheese (2nd), ducks (2nd), barley (2nd), wine and vermouth (3rd), grape must (3rd), green onions (3rd), rabbit meat (3rd), alfalfa (3rd), ice cream (3rd), cow's milk cheese (3rd), duck meat (3rd), hazelnuts (3rd), apricots (4th), artichokes (4th), turkeys (4th), canned corn (4th), lactose (4th), horses (4th), skimmed milk powder and whey (4th), rapeseed oil (4th), rice flour (4th), sugar (4th), sunflower seeds (4th), cream (4th), sorghum (4th), alcoholic beverages (4th), lamb (5th), baked goods (5th), frozen potatoes (5th), goat meat (5th), frozen corn (5th), fresh corn (5th), poppy seeds (5th), cauliflower (5th), egg powder (5th), beans (6th), grape juice (6th), dried peas (6th), walnuts (6th), wheat (6th), cocoa butter (6th), chickens (6th), millet (6th), rapeseed (6th), butter (6th), prunes (6th), wool (6th), barley groats (6th), turkey meat (7th), chestnuts (7th), roasted coffee (7th), rabbits (7th), raspberries (7th), frozen vegetables (7th), tomatoes (7th), lard (7th), dried milk (7th), cocoa powder (8th), canned mushrooms (8th), oats (8th), sunflower oil (8th), rye (8th), beef (9th), corn flour and maize grain (9th), wheat flour (9th), rye flour (9th), cider (9th), dried mushrooms (9th), apples (9th), goose meat (10th), horse meat (10th), pork (10th). In monetary terms, France was the world's largest exporter of wine and the second-largest exporter of spirits. Taxation of French farms is the highest in the European Union; in 2022, France accounted for 35% of EU farm taxes, with production taxes amounting to 18 euro cents per euro of output, compared to an EU average of 8 euro cents and just 2 euro cents in Germany. Regarding agricultural subsidies, France ranked among the lowest in the EU, with subsidies amounting to 11 euro cents per euro (the EU average was 13 euro cents, whereas in the US, subsidies account for 25% of turnover).

== Crop production ==
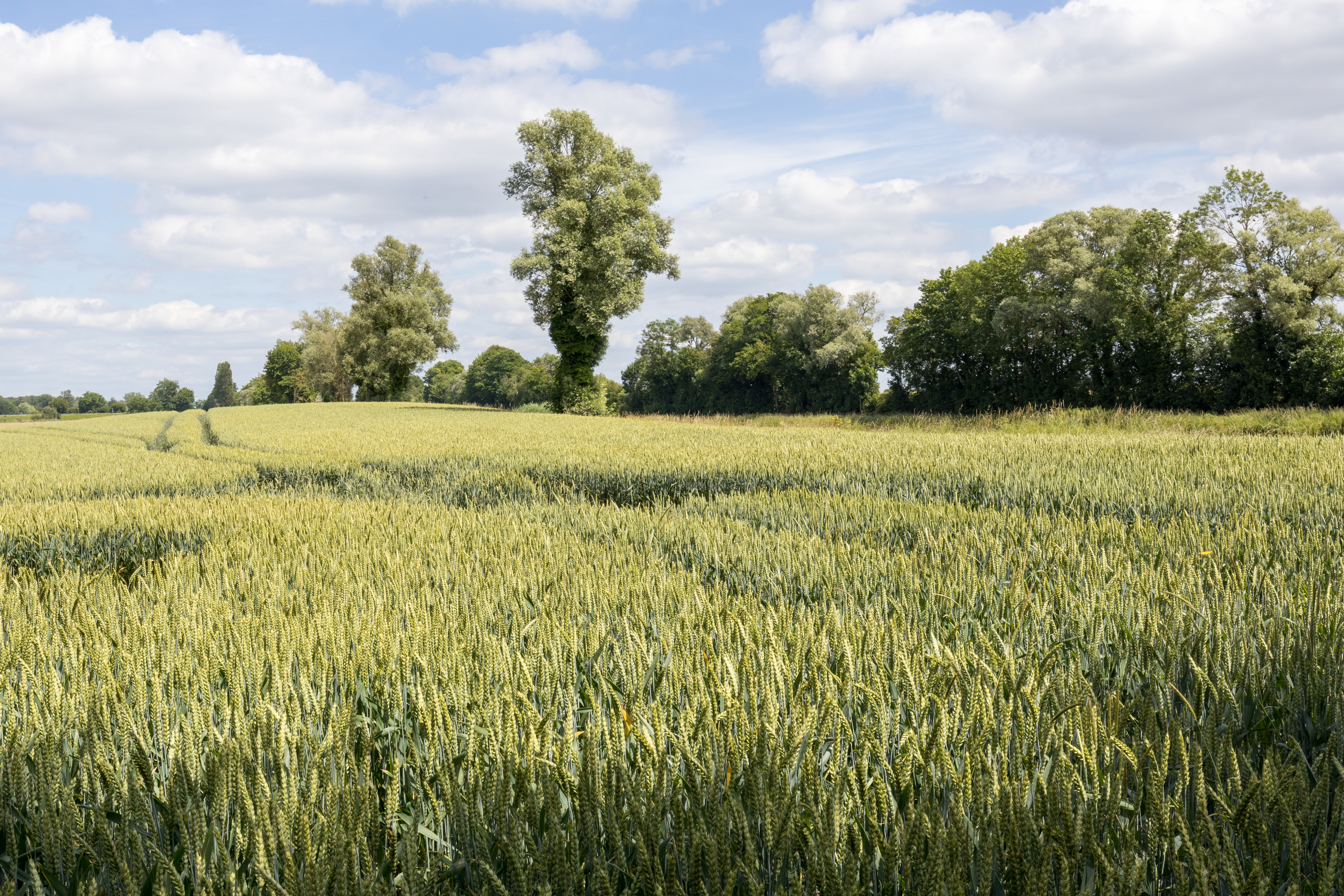
Wheat field in northern France

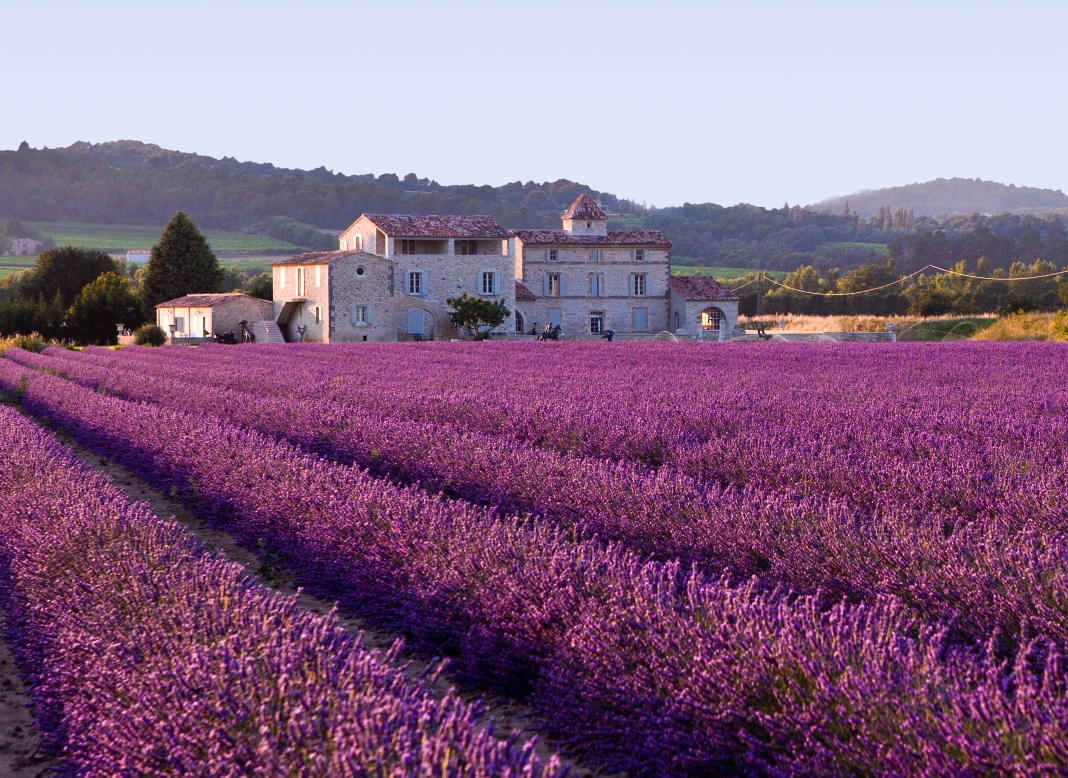
Lavender field in Provence

As of 2021, crop production accounted for 61% of the total value of agricultural output, including cereals (18%), vegetable and fruit growing (17%), and viticulture (13%).

Cereal cultivation leads the crop sector; one in every two French farms produces grain. Soft wheat accounts for half of the area sown with grain crops; corn (16%) and barley also play significant roles, while other important crops include triticale, oats, sorghum, rye, and rice. Total grain production amounts to 57 million tonnes annually, comprising 30 million tonnes of wheat, 13 million tonnes of corn, and 10 million tonnes of barley. Average yields are: wheat — 76.6 centners/ha; corn — 91.1 centners/ha; barley — 68.4 centners/ha. The primary region for wheat cultivation is the Paris Basin; for corn, the Garonne Lowland; and for rice, the Rhône Delta.

The main oilseed crops by gross harvest volume are rapeseed (3.3 million tonnes in 2020), sunflower (1.6 million tonnes), and soybeans (406.7 thousand tonnes); olives are grown along the Mediterranean coast. The main industrial crop sugar beet is a major crop, grown primarily in the Hauts-de-France and Île-de-France regions, where the majority of sugar refineries are also located. Sugarcane cultivation is common in the overseas territories (Martinique, Réunion). The main tobacco-producing areas are Aquitaine, Alsace, and the foothills of the central Pyrenees. Flowers—primarily roses—are grown along the Mediterranean coast; the commune of Grasse is the main center for flower cultivation for the perfume industry.

Total potato production exceeds 8 million tonnes, while vegetable production stands at 4.4 million tonnes; the main vegetable varieties are onions, tomatoes, carrots, and cabbage. France ranks third in Europe for fruit production, behind Italy and Spain; in 2020, total output was 8.9 million tonnes, including 1.6 million tonnes of apples, 179,000 tonnes of peaches, 201,000 tonnes of plums, 138,000 tonnes of pears, and 86,000 tonnes of apricots. Other crops include melons (266,000 tonnes), strawberries (55,000 tonnes), citrus fruits (73,000 tonnes), walnuts (35,700 tonnes), and mushrooms (80,000 tonnes).

=== Viticulture ===
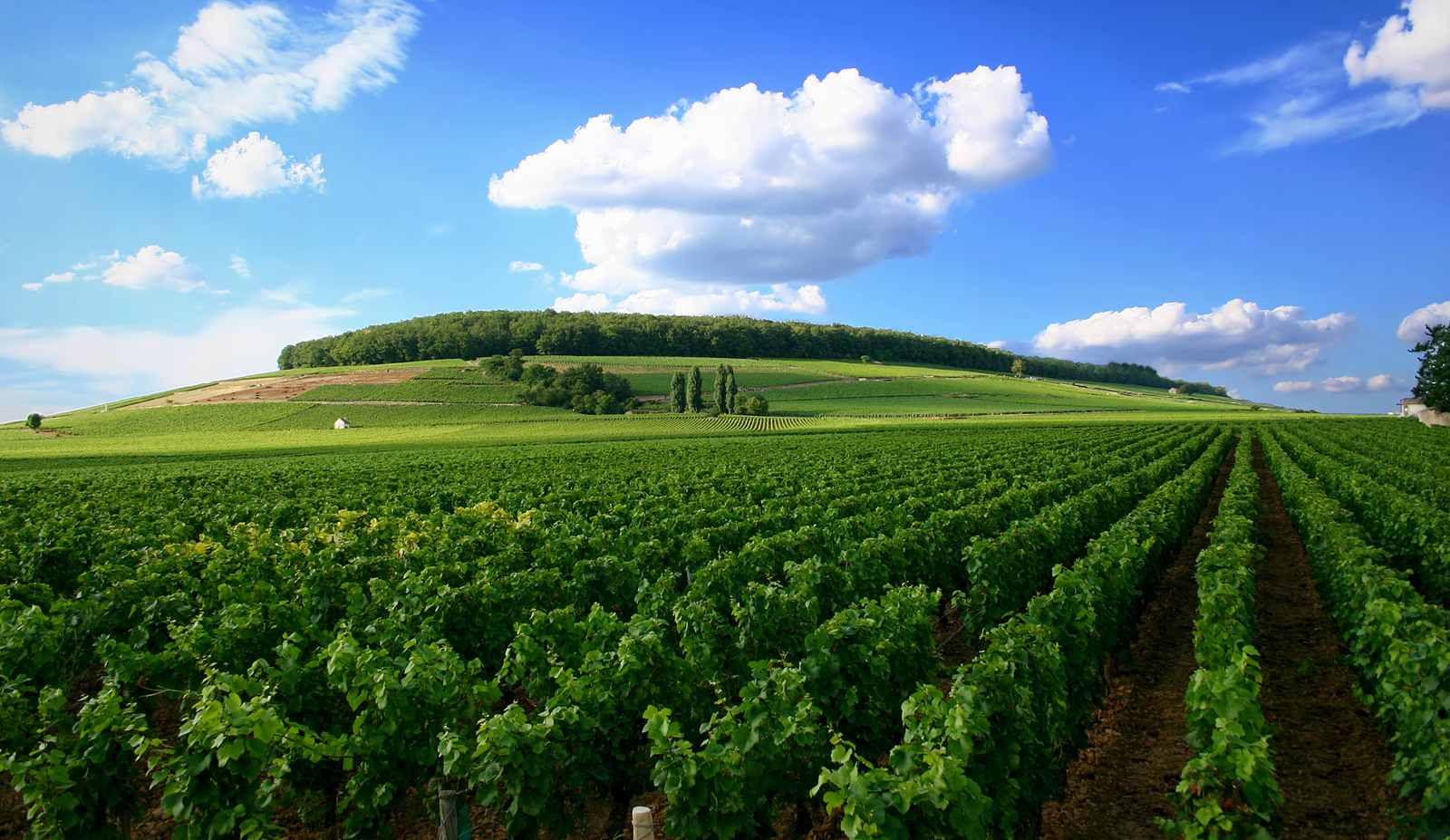
Vineyards in Burgundy

Grape production in France amounts to approximately 6 million tonnes annually. The main wine-producing regions are Languedoc, Champagne, Burgundy, the middle Loire valley, the lower Garonne valley, Gascony, and the Rhône and Rhine valleys.

In 2023, France was the world's largest wine producer, with an output of 48 million hectolitres.

== Livestock Farming ==
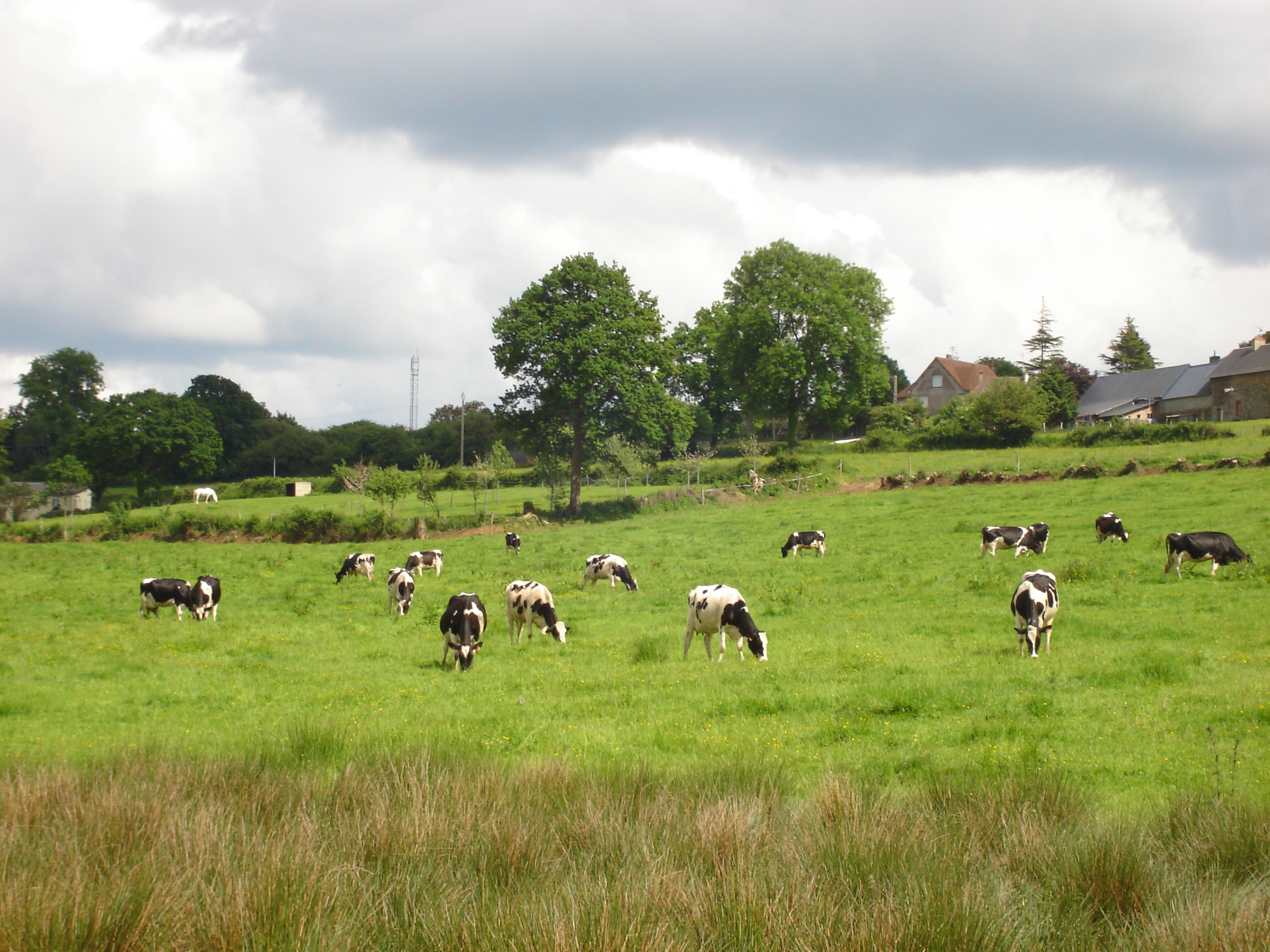
Pasture in Normandy

In 2021, livestock farming accounted for 33% of the value of agricultural output, comprising meat (14%), milk (13%), and eggs (6%). Livestock farming is most developed in the western part of France (the Brittany and Normandy regions). The cattle herd—the largest in Europe—numbers 19 million head, including 3.8 million dairy cows and 4 million beef cattle; the herd size has been declining since the early 1980s due to European Union milk quotas. Common beef breeds include Charolais, Limousin, Blonde d'Aquitaine, Salers, Aubrac, and Gasconne. France ranks second in Europe for milk production (23 billion liters per year). Dairy farming is carried out by over 80,000 farms, with an average of 44 cows and 60 hectares of pasture or cropland per holding. Milk is processed at 700 dairy plants.

The pig population in France stands at 14 million head (10% of the European total). Main breeds: French Landrace, Large White, Pietrain, and Duroc. France ranks third in the European Union for pork production.

== Fisheries ==
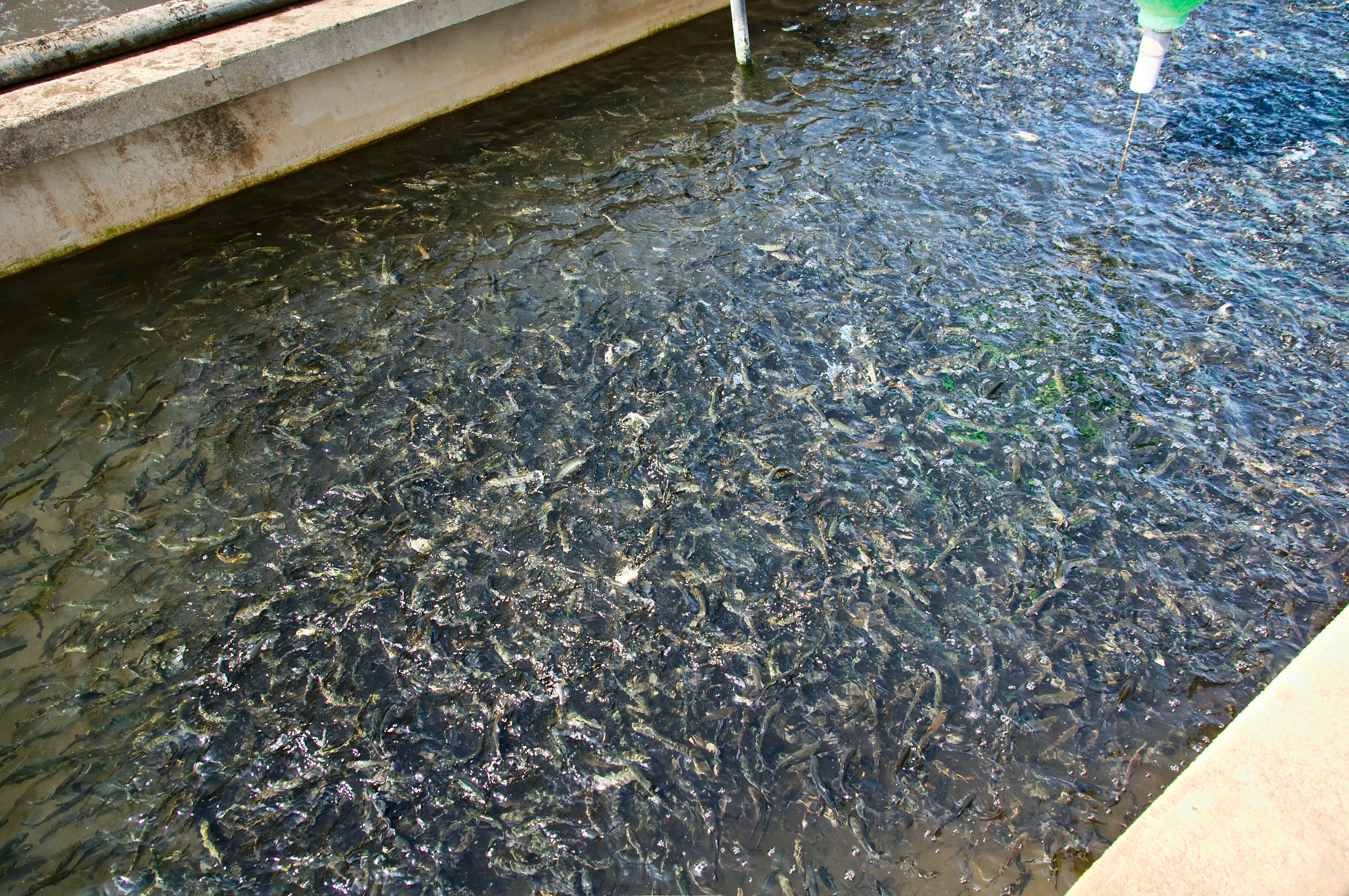
Trout farming in the Pas-de-Calais department

France's fishery resources are severely depleted. Farmed trout accounts for the majority of the catch in rivers and lakes. Marine fishing is developed in the coastal waters of the Atlantic Ocean (in the Bay of Biscay and the English Channel), targeting herring, cod, tuna, sardines, mackerel, flatfish, and silver hake, as well as lobsters, shrimp, and shellfish.

The fish catch in 2020 totaled 458.5 thousand tonnes (5th place in the EU). The fishing fleet comprises 6.2 thousand vessels, and the industry employs 20 thousand people. Major fishing ports include Boulogne-sur-Mer, Lorient, and La Rochelle. Oyster farming is established in the towns of Arcachon, La Tremblade, Marennes, and Cancale.

== Cooperatives ==
As of 2005, 75% of French farmers were members of cooperatives, with a total of approximately 6,900 cooperatives in existence. Agricultural cooperatives in France began to emerge in the late 19th century; a process of consolidation began in the 1950s. By the beginning of the 21st century, some cooperatives had evolved into large agro-industrial groups with networks of overseas subsidiaries.

Cooperatives with a turnover of over €1 billion as of 2023:

Cooperative name	Region	Main products	Revenue (€ billion)	Farmer-members	Employees
InVivo	Île-de-France	cereals	11.7		15,000
Agrial	Normandy	meat, milk	7.4	12,500	22,000
Tereos	Île-de-France	sugar	7.14	10,700	15,800
Sodiaal	Île-de-France	milk	5.8	15,300	9,000
Terrena	Pays de la Loire	grain, meat	5.5	19,000	11,300
Vivescia	Grand Est	grain	4.58	10,000	6,900
Axéréal	Centre-Val de Loire	grain	4.09	11,000	3,500
Eureden	Brittany	grain, meat, milk	3.85	17,000	8,000
Cooperl Arc Atlantique	Brittany	meat	2.92	4,660	7,400
Cristal Union	Grand Est	sugar	2.76	9,000	2,000
Groupe Even	Brittany	milk	2.7	1,000	6.2 thousand
Les Maîtres Laitiers du Cotentin	Normandy	milk	2.56	980	5 thousand
Limagrain	Auvergne-Rhône-Alpes	grain, vegetables	2.52	1.3 thousand	9.7 thousand
Advitam	Hauts-de-France	grain	1.65	6 thousand	2.6 thousand
Euralis	Nouvelle-Aquitaine	grain, meat	1.57	5.6 thousand	5 thousand
CAVAC	Pays de la Loire	grain, meat	1.4	4.7 thousand	1.7 thousand
Maïsadour	Nouvelle-Aquitaine	grain, meat	1.39	5 thousand	4.3 thousand
SCAEL	Centre-Val de Loire	grain	1.37	1.8 thousand	615
Lur Berri	Nouvelle-Aquitaine	grain, meat	1.35	5.1 thousand	3.8 thousand
NatUp	Normandy	grain, vegetables	1.29	7 thousand	1.8 thousand
Arterris	Occitania	grain	1.14	15 thousand	3,000

== GMOs ==
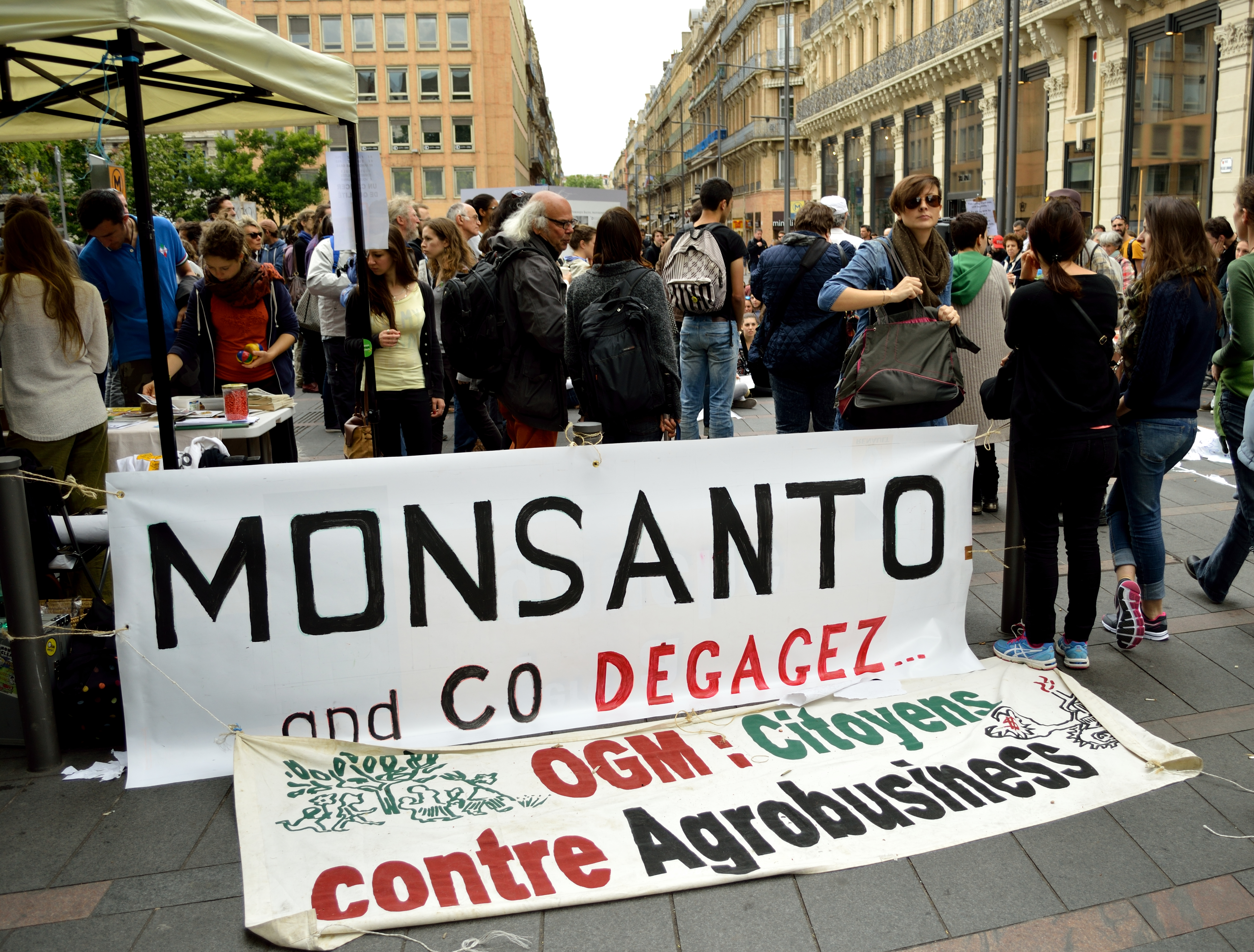
March against Monsanto in Toulouse

In 1998, France became the first country in Europe to begin cultivating genetically modified maize from seeds imported from the USA (developed by the company Novartis). However, a moratorium on the use of GMOs was imposed that same year. In 2005, the cultivation of modified maize (this time developed by Monsanto, MON 810) resumed; by 2007, the cultivated area exceeded 20,000 hectares. Experiments with GMOs in France were accompanied by heated political debates, protests, and acts of vandalism by environmentalists and certain farmers' organizations.

A 2008 law banned the cultivation of genetically modified plants for commercial use in France. Later, in 2011, this law was ruled to be in conflict with European Union regulations by both the European Court of Justice and the French Council of State; Nevertheless, the ban on GMO cultivation remains in place, and in 2020 it was extended to include artificial mutagenesis.

Special authorization is required for the import of modified varieties; as of 2022, approximately 100 varieties of maize, soybean, rapeseed, cotton, and sugar beet had been approved for import, allowing them to be processed and sold with appropriate labeling. France imports large quantities of modified soybeans for animal feed (primarily from Brazil). Oversight of GMO use is carried out by the National Agency for Food, Environmental and Occupational Health Safety (ANSES) and, at the pan-European level, by the European Food Safety Authority. The ban on GMOs does not apply to experiments conducted for research purposes.
