= Buste-socle =

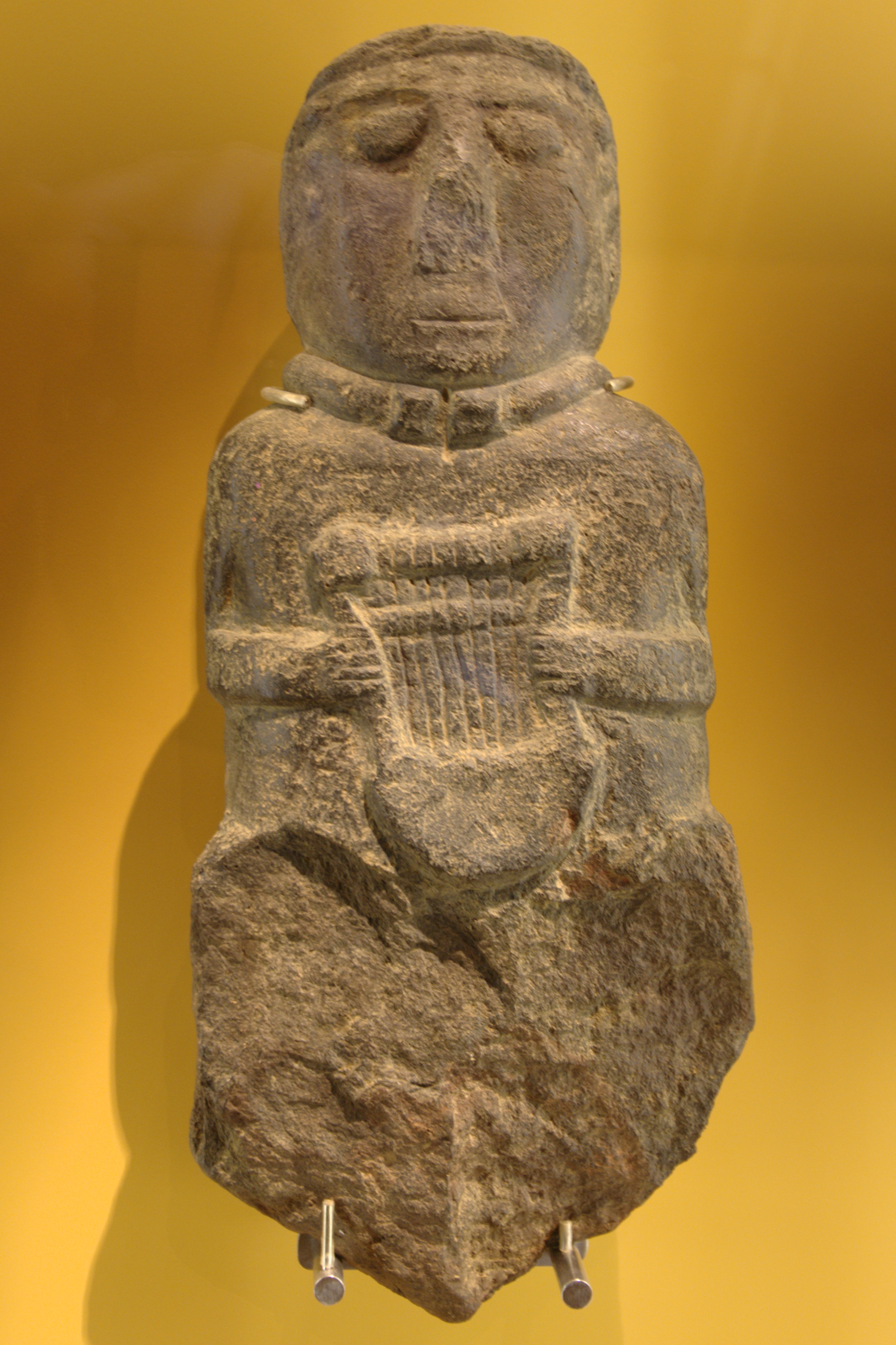
The Bard of Paule.

A buste-socle (Note: In the French literature, "buste sur socle" (literally, "bust on plinth") is the phrase more commonly used (see, e.g., Menez 1999, Duceppe-Lamarre 2002, Girond 2011). Philip Kiernan (2020) has adapted this into English as buste-socle.) is a type of Iron Age stone statue found in France. Most buste-socles have been found within Armorica (a historical region of Gaul, roughly modern day Brittany), though examples have been found in central and southern France. The statues are busts of male figures which sit on an unworked square base (or socle). These bases were perhaps intended to be buried. The statues have been dated to within the later La Tène period.

Excavations at Paule, Côtes-d'Armor between 1988 and 1997 found four buste-socles. A lyre-playing figure with a torc, named the Bard of Paule, is perhaps the best known buste-socle. It is from the examples found at Paule that archaeologist Yves Menez (in a 1999 article) defined this type.

Buste-socles usually have a height upwards of 20cm and less than 1 metre. The largest known buste-socle (found in Bozouls, Aveyron) measures 95 cm. On some buste-socles the arms and torso are rendered and on others only the head is (as on a herm). Of those with arms, some have their arms pressed flat against the torso while others hold items. The Bard of Paule holds a lyre and the buste-socle from Bozouls wields a dagger.

Several buste-socles have been found in archaeological contexts that suggest they were recipients of devotion. A buste-socle found in Tour Magne, Nîmes was mounted in a box into which coins had been thrown. A granite buste-socle found in La Vraie-Croix, Morbihan was ploughed up next to a Roman altar, suggesting that such devotion extended into Roman times. However, one buste-socle from Molesme, Côte-d'Or appears to have been part of a late La Tène sanctuary complex and then deliberately buried during the reign of Tiberius.

What these statues were intended to depict is not certain. Menez has suggested the Paule buste-socles were intended as ancestor portraits. Armelle Duceppe-Lamarre has suggested a Levroux, Indre buste-socle, buried in the 1st century BC with a polisher and a deer antler, was intended to depict a god (with the polisher and deer antler intended as that god's attributes).

== Gallery ==
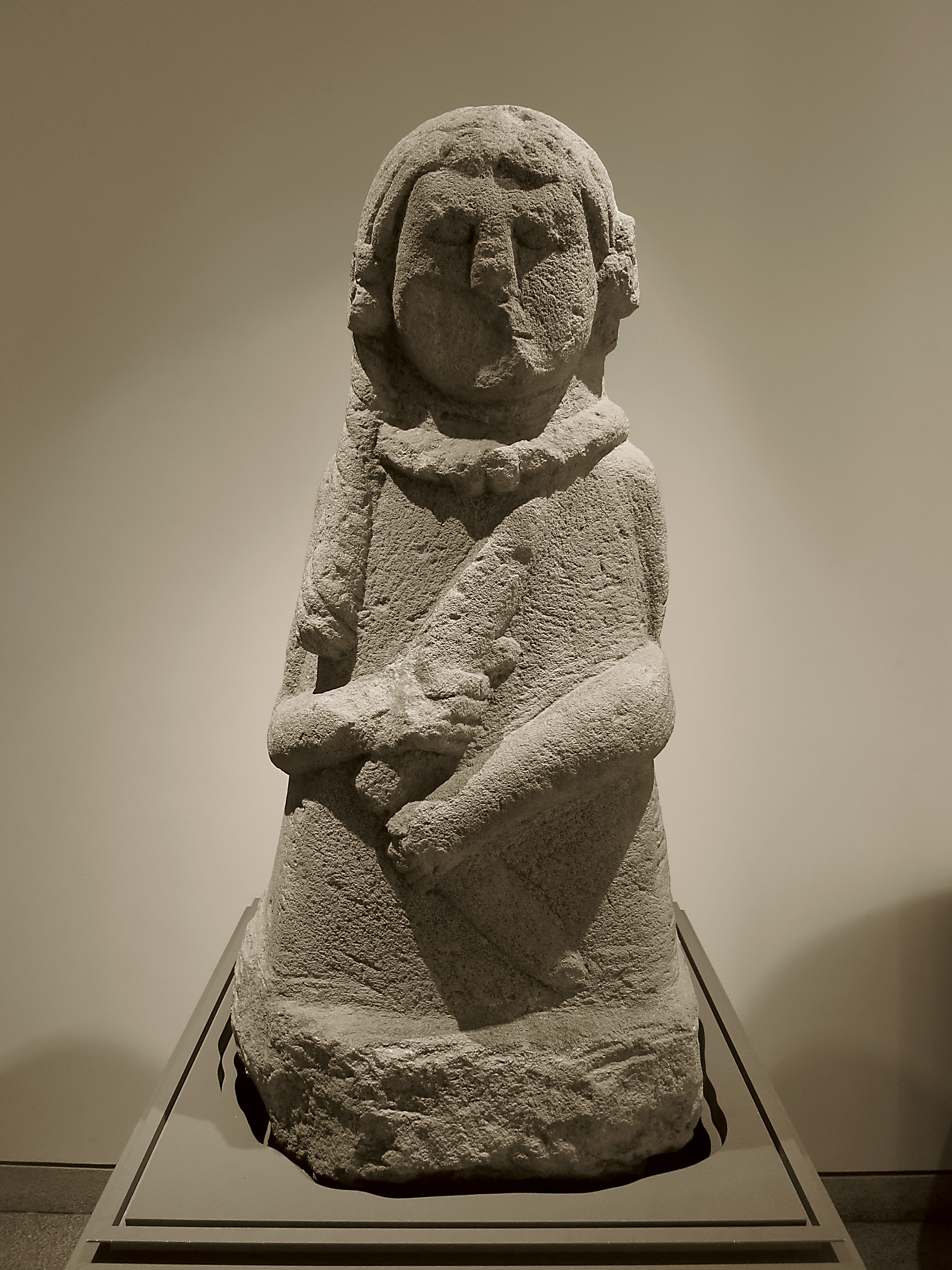
Buste-socle wielding a dagger from Bozouls, Aveyron.

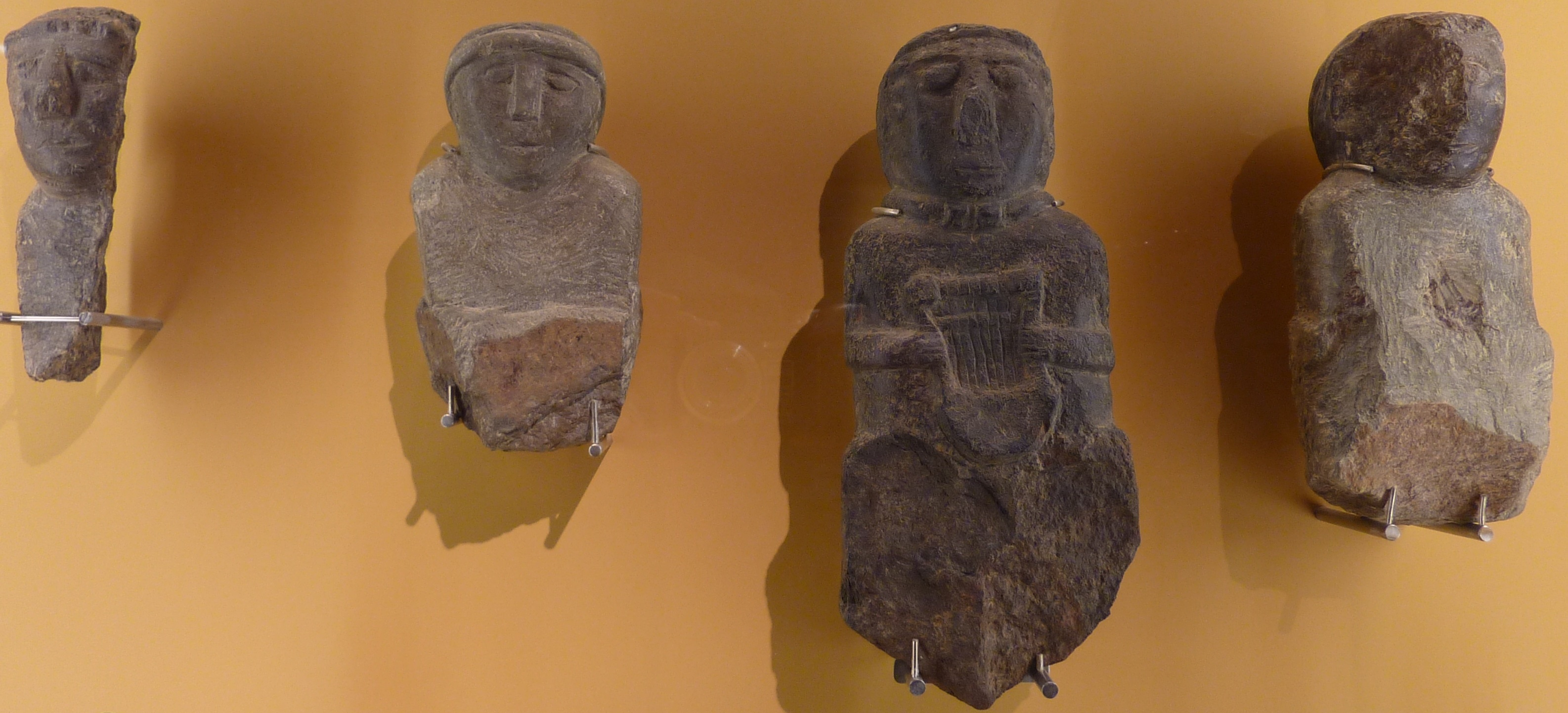
All four buste-socles found at Paule, Côtes-d'Armor.

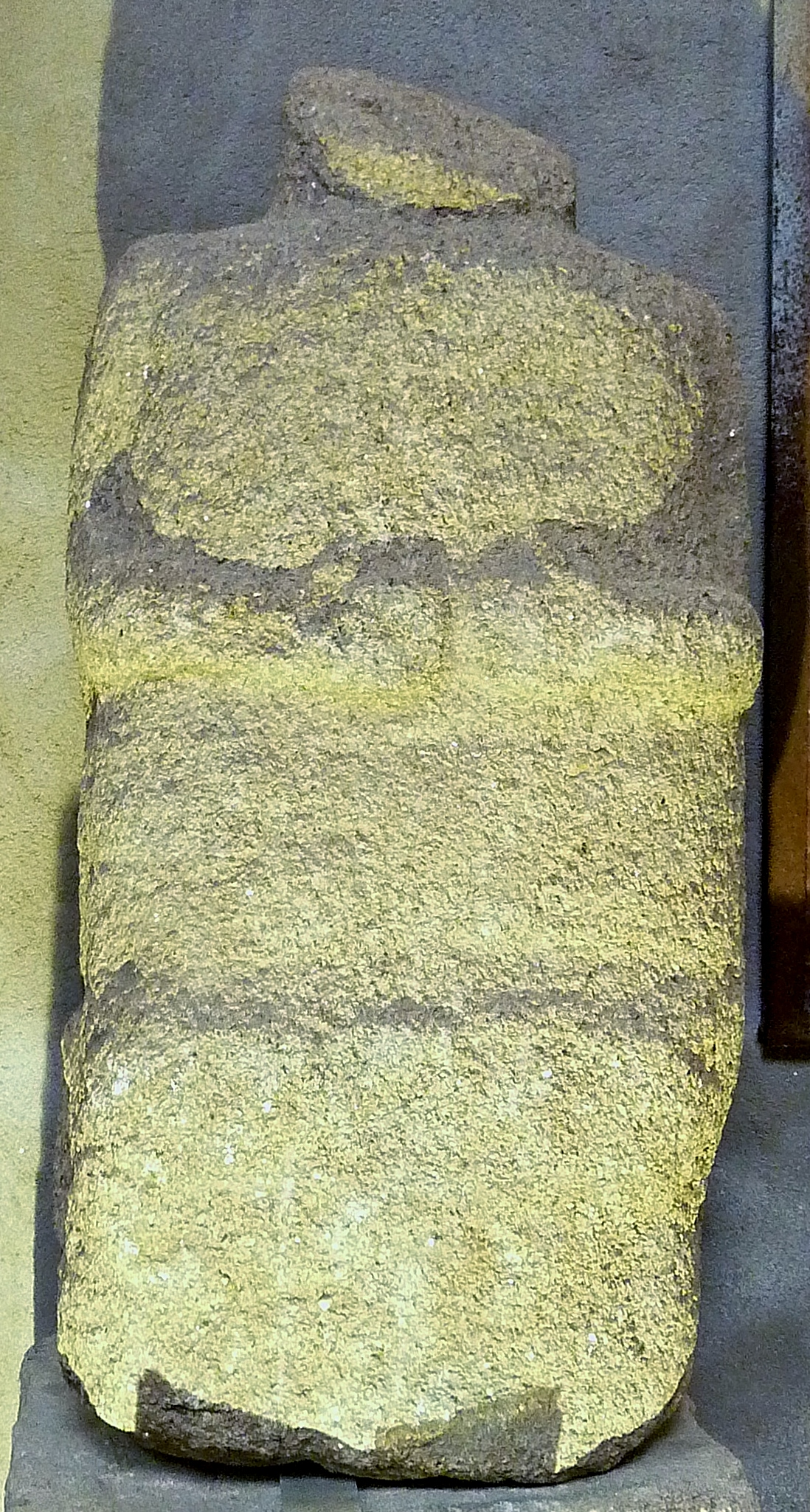
Decapitated buste-socle from Plounévez-Lochrist, Finistère.

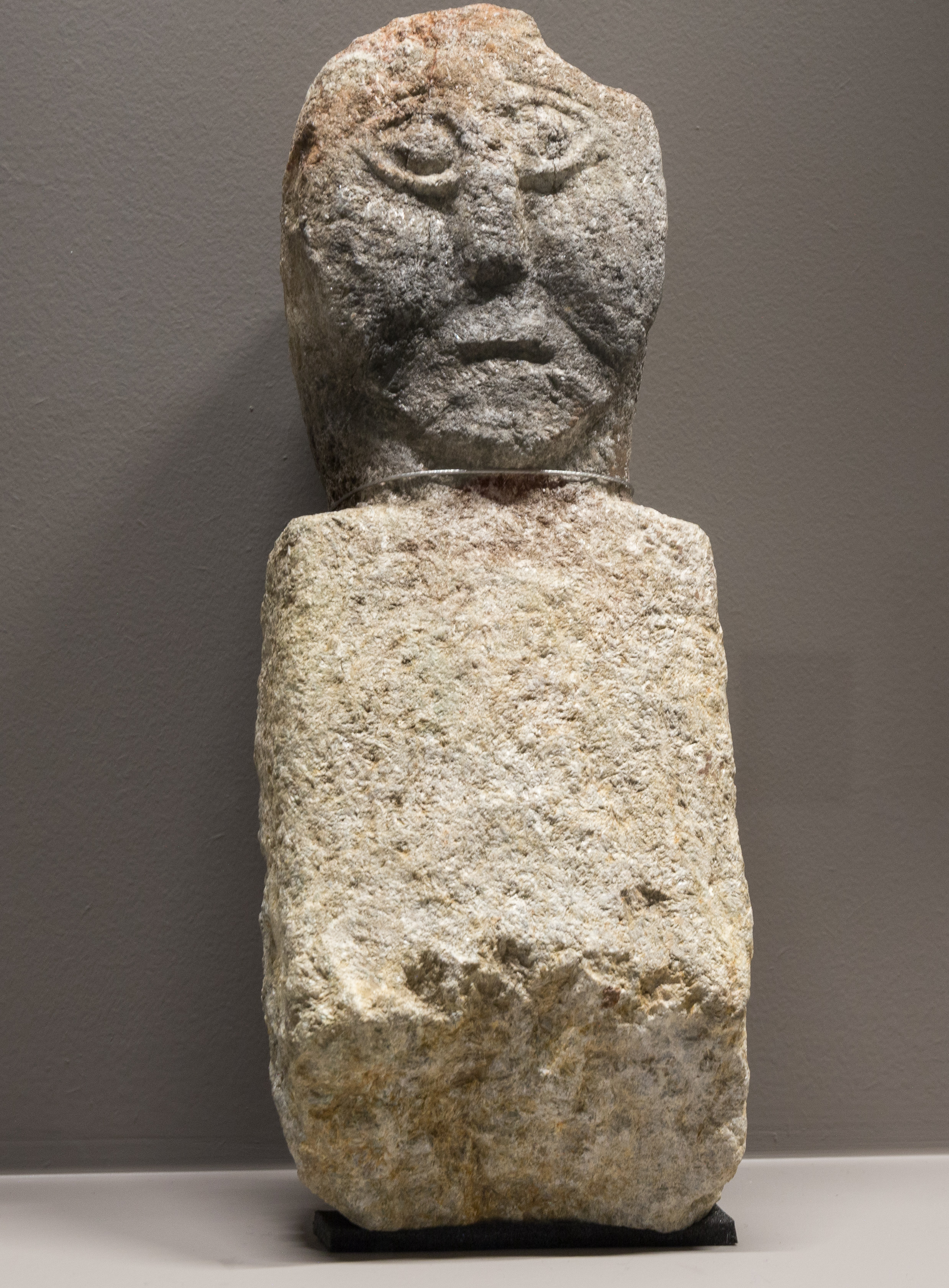
A herm-type buste-socle from Trémuson, Côtes-d'Armor.

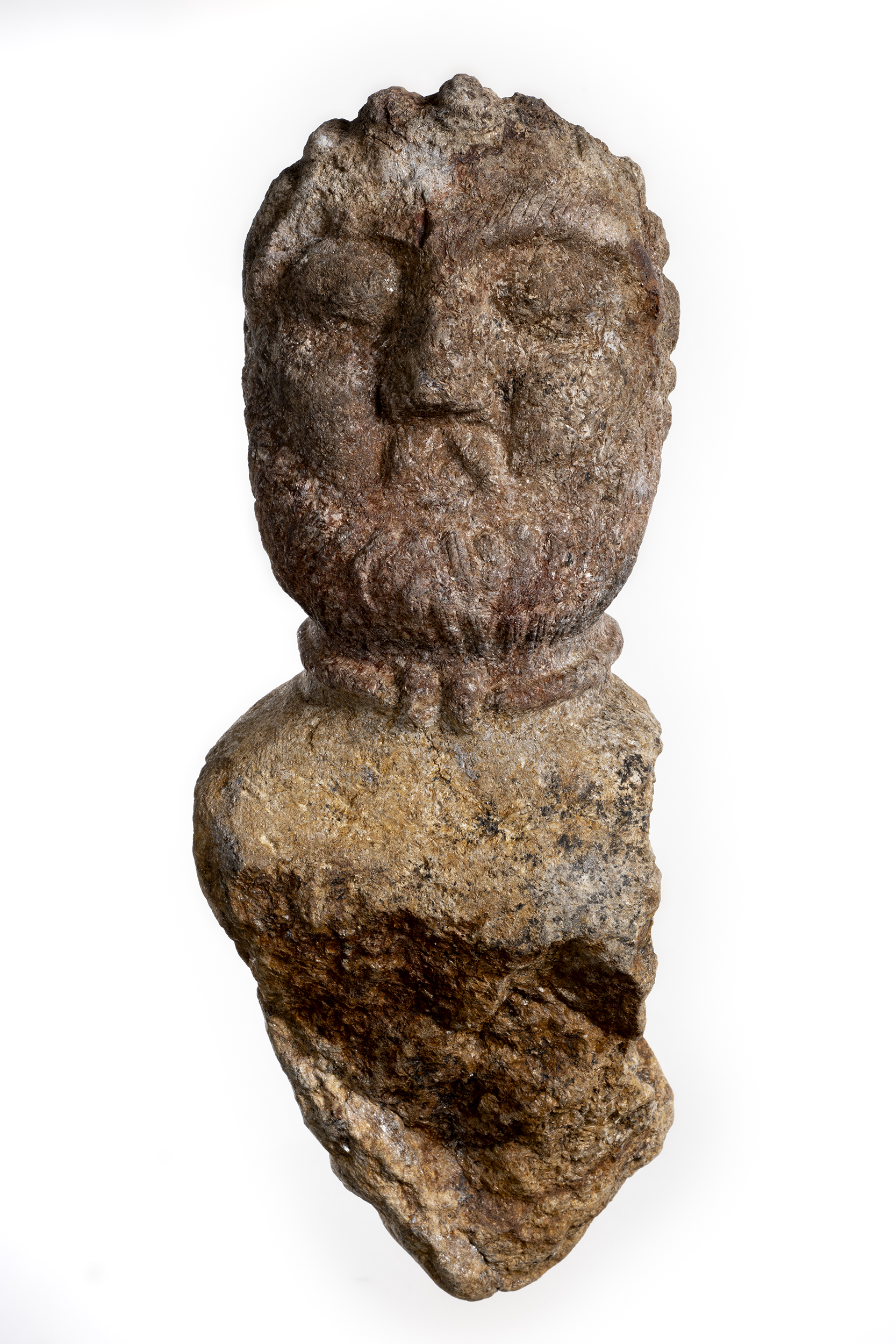
A herm-type buste-socle with a torc from Trémuson, Côtes-d'Armor.
