= Saint-Brieuc–Armor Airport =

Saint-Brieuc–Armor Airport Aéroport de Saint-Brieuc–Armor
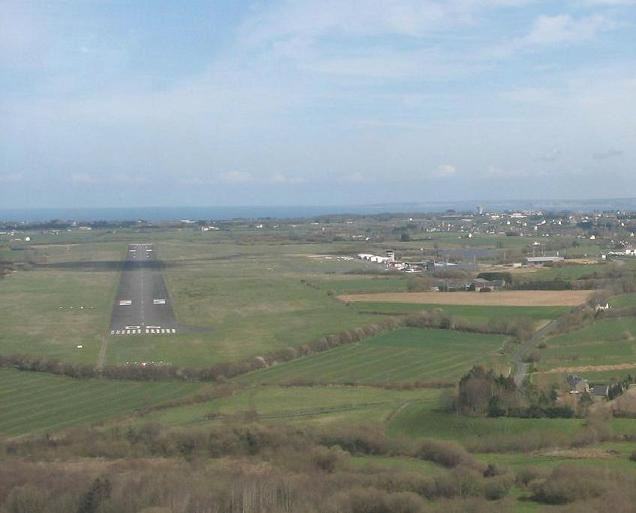
- IATA: SBK; ICAO: LFRT

Summary
- Airport type: Public
- Operator: CCI Côtes d'Armor
- Serves: Saint-Brieuc, Côtes-d'Armor, France
- Location: Trémuson
- Elevation AMSL: 452 ft / 138 m
- Coordinates: 48°32′15″N 002°51′24″W
- Website: st-brieuc.aeroport.fr
- Interactive map of Saint-Brieuc–Armor Airport

Runways
Direction	Length		Surface
Direction	m	ft	Surface
06/24	2,200	7,218	Paved
- Source: French AIP

Saint-Brieuc–Armor Airport (French: Aéroport de Saint-Brieuc–Armor) (IATA: SBK, ICAO: LFRT) is an airport situated 7.5 km (4.7 mi) northwest of Saint-Brieuc, a commune of the Côtes-d'Armor department in the Brittany (Bretagne) region of northwestern France.

The airport is located in Trémuson and is also referred to as the Saint-Brieuc - Trémuson Airport.

The airport is also a maintenance base for Atlantic Air Industries (AAI) which specialises in the overhaul and maintenance of regional and commuter airliners. The company occupies a large hangar on site.

== Airlines and destinations ==
The airport is currently not served by scheduled services. However, Isles of Scilly Skybus did operate a service to Newquay Airport on a summer only basis throughout the late 2000s (decade) - this had been dropped by summer 2011.
