= Tréméloir =

Tréméloir Tremelar
- Part of Pordic
- Location of Tréméloir
- Location within France Location within Brittany
- Coordinates: 48°33′22″N 2°51′25″W
- Country: France
- Region: Brittany
- Department: Côtes-d'Armor
- Arrondissement: Saint-Brieuc
- Canton: Plérin
- Commune: Pordic
- Area^{1}: 4.69 km^{2} (1.81 sq mi)
- Highest elevation: 139 m (456 ft)
- Lowest elevation: 59 m (194 ft)
- Population (2018): 869
  - Density: 185/km^{2} (480/sq mi)
- Time zone: UTC+01:00 (CET)
  - Summer (DST): UTC+02:00 (CEST)
- Postal code: 22590
- ^{1} French Land Register data, which excludes lakes, ponds, glaciers > 1 km^{2} (0.386 sq mi or 247 acres) and river estuaries.

Tréméloir (French pronunciation: [tʁemelwaʁ]; Breton: Tremelar) is a former commune in the Côtes-d'Armor department of Brittany in northwestern France. On 1 January 2016, it was merged into the commune Pordic.

== Population ==
Historical population

| Year | Pop. | ±% p.a. |
|---|---|---|
| 1856 | 681 | — |
| 1901 | 504 | −0.67% |
| 1936 | 351 | −1.03% |
| 1962 | 334 | −0.19% |
| 1968 | 338 | +0.20% |

| Year | Pop. | ±% p.a. |
|---|---|---|
| 1975 | 342 | +0.17% |
| 1982 | 386 | +1.74% |
| 1990 | 424 | +1.18% |
| 1999 | 443 | +0.49% |
| 2018 | 869 | +3.61% |

Source: EHESS and INSEE

The town experienced significant depopulation at the beginning of the 20th century: its population of roughly 700 fell to less than 400 by the beginning of the 1980s. Since then, however, the population has grown dramatically, mostly due to an influx of young people looking for cheaper housing than was available in Saint-Brieuc. In 2007, the population was once again estimated at 700 people. The local primary school, which had closed in 1986 due to lack of demand, was reopened on 30 August 2007 with 78 students in three classes. As the school's original buildings were not compliant with modern environmental norms, classes were initially held in prefabricated, temporary buildings.

== See also ==
- Communes of the Côtes-d'Armor department
