= Bigard =

Bigard is a French surname. Notable people with the surname include:

- Barney Bigard, American jazz clarinetist
- Jean-Marie Bigard, French comedian and actor
- Jean-Paul Bigard, founder of Groupe Bigard
- John Bigard, English MP

== See also ==
- Groupe Bigard, French meat processing company
