= Pordic =

Pordic Porzhig
- Commune
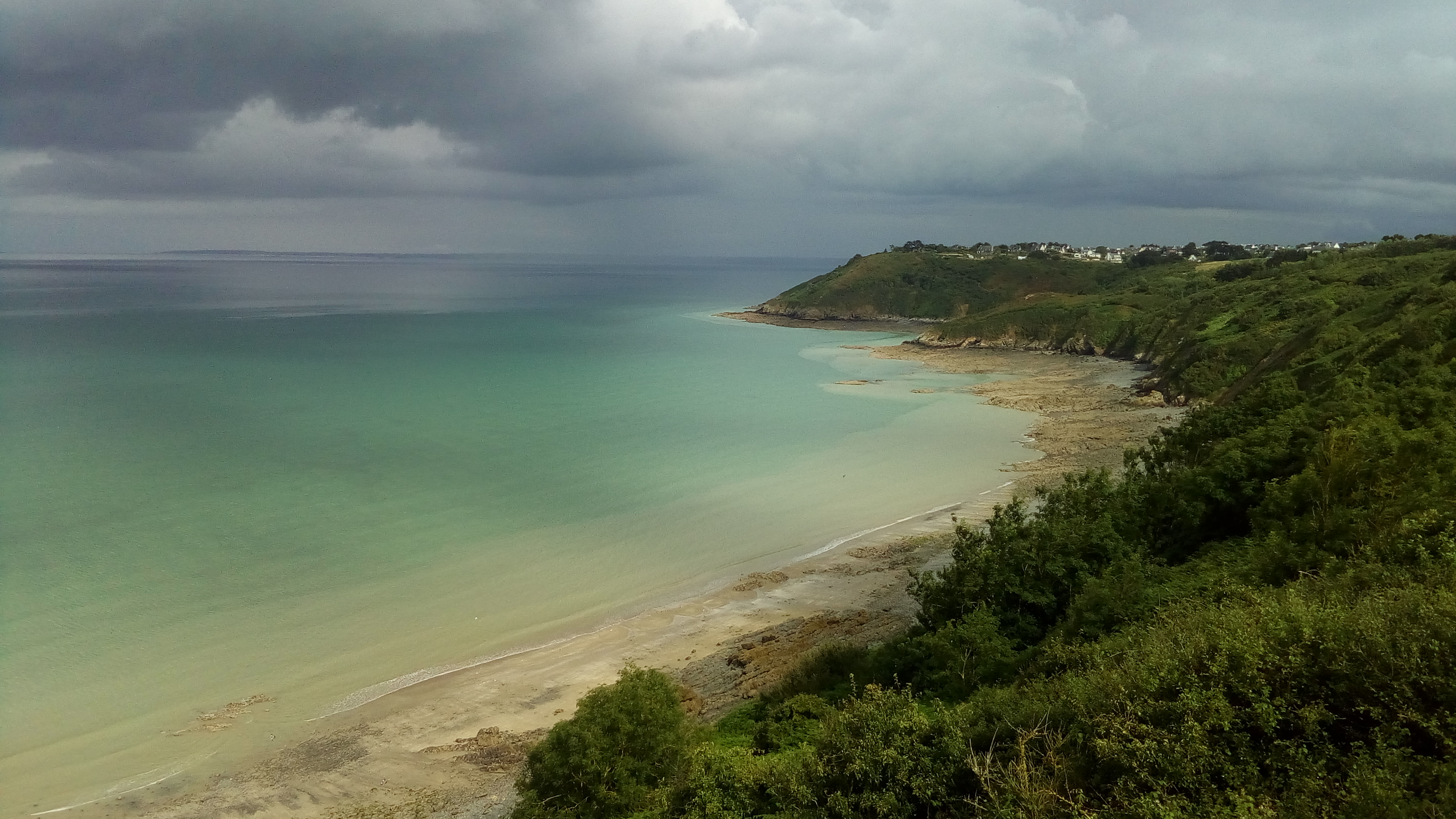
- Port-Jéhan beach and the Pointe de Pordic
- Location of Pordic
- Location within France Location within Brittany
- Coordinates: 48°34′16″N 2°48′59″W
- Country: France
- Region: Brittany
- Department: Côtes-d'Armor
- Arrondissement: Saint-Brieuc
- Canton: Plérin
- Intercommunality: Saint-Brieuc Armor

Government
  - Mayor (2020–2026): Joël Batard
- Area^{1}: 33.63 km^{2} (12.98 sq mi)
- Highest elevation: 143 m (469 ft)
- Lowest elevation: 0 m (0 ft)
- Population (2023): 7,454
  - Density: 221.6/km^{2} (574.1/sq mi)
- Time zone: UTC+01:00 (CET)
  - Summer (DST): UTC+02:00 (CEST)
- INSEE/Postal code: 22251 /22590
- ^{1} French Land Register data, which excludes lakes, ponds, glaciers > 1 km^{2} (0.386 sq mi or 247 acres) and river estuaries.

Pordic (French pronunciation: [pɔʁdik]; Breton: Porzhig; Gallo: Pordic) is a commune in the Côtes-d'Armor department of Brittany in northwestern France. On 1 January 2016 the former commune of Tréméloir merged into Pordic.

== Population ==
People from Pordic are called pordicais in French. Population data refer to the commune in its geography as of January 2025.

Historical population
Year	Pop.	±% p.a.
1968	3,295	—
1975	3,685	+1.61%
1982	4,674	+3.45%
1990	5,059	+0.99%
1999	5,619	+1.17%
2007	6,339	+1.52%
2012	6,823	+1.48%
2017	7,167	+0.99%
2023	7,454	+0.66%
Source: INSEE

== Breton language ==
The municipality launched a linguistic plan through Ya d'ar brezhoneg on 19 September 2008.

== International relations ==
Pordic is twinned with:

- (United Kingdom) Hayle in the UK county of Cornwall.

== See also ==
- Communes of the Côtes-d'Armor department
