= Marché du Porc Breton =

The Marché du Porc Breton is a market in Plérin, Brittany, where the price of pork is set for the whole of France. Indeed, even though the price is only set for 18% of all French pork production, it serves as a benchmark for its price across France.

== 2015 French pork production crisis ==
In August 2015, both Cooperl Arc Atlantique and Groupe Bigard, the two largest pork production companies in France, refused to accept the price set at the Marché du Porc Breton, on the basis that it was too high in comparison with the price set by other European countries like Germany, where both companies also sell pork. The price was set by the French state at 1.40 Euros per kilogram to ensure farmers could afford to breed pigs, which is 0.38 Euros higher than the Dutch market.
