= Cooperl Arc Atlantique =

French pork processing company

- Company type: Private
- Industry: meat processing industry (NAF)
- Founded: 1966
- Headquarters: Lamballe, France
- Key people: Bernard Rouxel (Chairman); Emmanuel Commault (President)
- Website: www.cooperl.com

Cooperl Arc Atlantique (a.k.a. Cooperl) is the largest pork processing company in France.

== Overview ==
Cooperl Arc Atlantique was founded in 1966. The company breeds pigs, kills them in slaughterhouses, and distributes cut pieces of pork for sale. Its slaughterhouses are located in Montfort-sur-Meu, and its head office is in Lamballe, both of which are located in Brittany.

In 2012, the company opened a branch in Beijing, China and Moscow, Russia.

As of 2015, it is the largest pork processing company in France. Its competitor is Groupe Bigard.

In June 2017, Cooperl acquired the "charcuterie and cured meats" division of the Financière Turenne Lafayette group, which included the brands "Paul Prédault," "Lampaulaise de Salaisons," "Madrange," and "Montagne Noire."

In 2018, the company began constructing a biogas plant in Lamballe, which became the largest non-spreading biogas plant in Europe as of December 2, 2019.

In February 2019, the Cooperl acquired the Jean Caby brand.

In 2020, the competition authority fined the company €35.5 million for its involvement in a price-fixing scandal in the processed meat market.

A 2023 investigation by Splann media reports that Cooperl's diversification strategy is causing economic difficulties, while the pork cooperative imposes most technical decisions on its farmers.

== 2015 French pork production crisis ==
In August 2015, both Cooperl Arc Atlantique and Groupe Bigard refused to accept the price set at the Marché du Porc Breton in Plérin, which is used as the norm across France, on the basis that it was too high in comparison with the price set by other European countries like Germany, where both companies also sell pork.
