= Groupe Bigard =

French meat processing company

- Company type: Private
- Industry: meat processing industry (NAF)
- Founded: 1968
- Founder: Jean-Paul Bigard
- Headquarters: Quimperlé, France
- Number of employees: 17,000 (2014)
- Website: www.bigard.fr

Groupe Bigard is a French meat processing company. It owns half of all slaughterhouses in France. It processes beef, mutton, and pork. Its best-known brandname is Charal.

== Overview ==
The company was founded as Société commerciale des viandes by Jean-Paul Bigard in 1968. It became known as Groupe Bigard six years later, in 1974.

The company's headquarters are in Quimperlé, France. It owns half of all slaughterhouses in France. It sells meat under the brandnames of Charal, D'Anvial, Tendre et Plus, and Shems. Its best-known brandname is Charal.

As of 2015, Jean-Paul Bigard owns 90% of the company, with an estimated wealth of 350 million Euros. He serves as the President of the Syndicat National de l'Industrie des Viandes (SNIV) and the Syndicat National du Commerce du Porc (SNCP).

In 2016, the company acquired Copvial SA for a symbolic one euro. The company had been placed in judicial liquidation on June 28, 2016.

== Facilities ==
The company's headquarters and main processing facility are located in Quimperlé, the group's historic factory.

As of 2010, the company operated 55 sites across France, including 23 slaughterhouses, accounting for nearly half of the country's private slaughterhouses. By 2023, the group had expanded to 60 industrial sites and 28 slaughterhouses in France.

== 2015 French pork production crisis ==
In August 2015, both Groupe Bigard and its competitor, Cooperl Arc Atlantique, refused to accept the price set at the Marché du Porc Breton in Plérin, which is used as the norm across France, on the basis that it was too high in comparison with the price set by other European countries like Germany, where both companies also sell pork.

== Sponsorship ==
In January 2022, Bigard signed a partnership agreement with the Racing 92 rugby club until 2025.
