= Canton of Plérin =

Coordinates: 48.54°N 2.77°W

The canton of Plérin is an administrative division of the Côtes-d'Armor department, northwestern France. Its borders were modified at the French canton reorganisation which came into effect in March 2015. Its seat is in Plérin.

It consists of the following communes:

1. Plérin
2. Pordic
3. Trémuson
