= InVivo =

French agricultural group

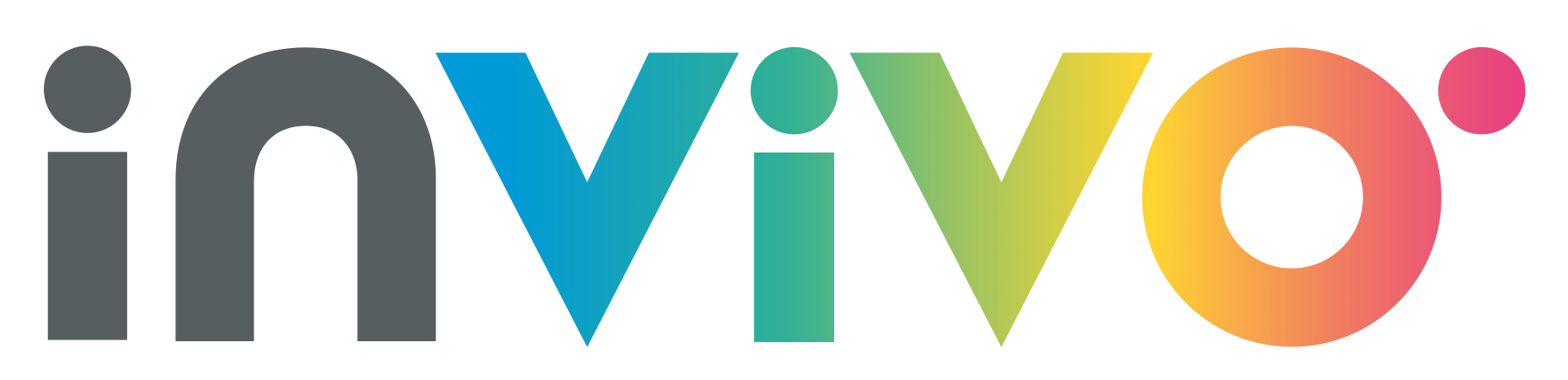
- Type: private company
- Founded: 2001; 25 years ago
- Headquarters: Paris, France

InVivo is an agricultural and agri-food multinational, originally formed from a union of 167 member agricultural cooperatives.

InVivo also owns the garden centers Gamm Vert, Jardiland, and Delbard, as well as the Louise bakeries through the Teract group.

== History ==
In May 2017, InVivo acquires 90 Gamm Vert stores from two of its franchisees, Axéréal and Terrena.

In November 2017, InVivo announces the acquisition of Jardiland for an undisclosed amount.

In July 2018, ADM announces the acquisition of Neovia, an InVivo subsidiary specializing in animal nutrition, for $1.8 billion.

In June 2019, InVivo acquires 29 Gamm Vert stores from its franchisee Maïsadour, out of the 36 it owns; the remaining seven are sold to another company.

In July 2020, InVivo entered negotiations to acquire a 57 percent stake in Vinadeis, a winegrowing cooperative in which it already held a 10 percent interest.

In January 2021, InVivo announced that it had entered negotiations to acquire the Soufflet Group. The acquisition of the Soufflet Group was completed in December 2021 for an undisclosed amount, estimated at €2.3 billion.

In 2025, InVivo was fined €2.7 million for international trafficking of counterfeit glyphosate.
