= Trémuson =

Trémuson Tremuzon
- Commune
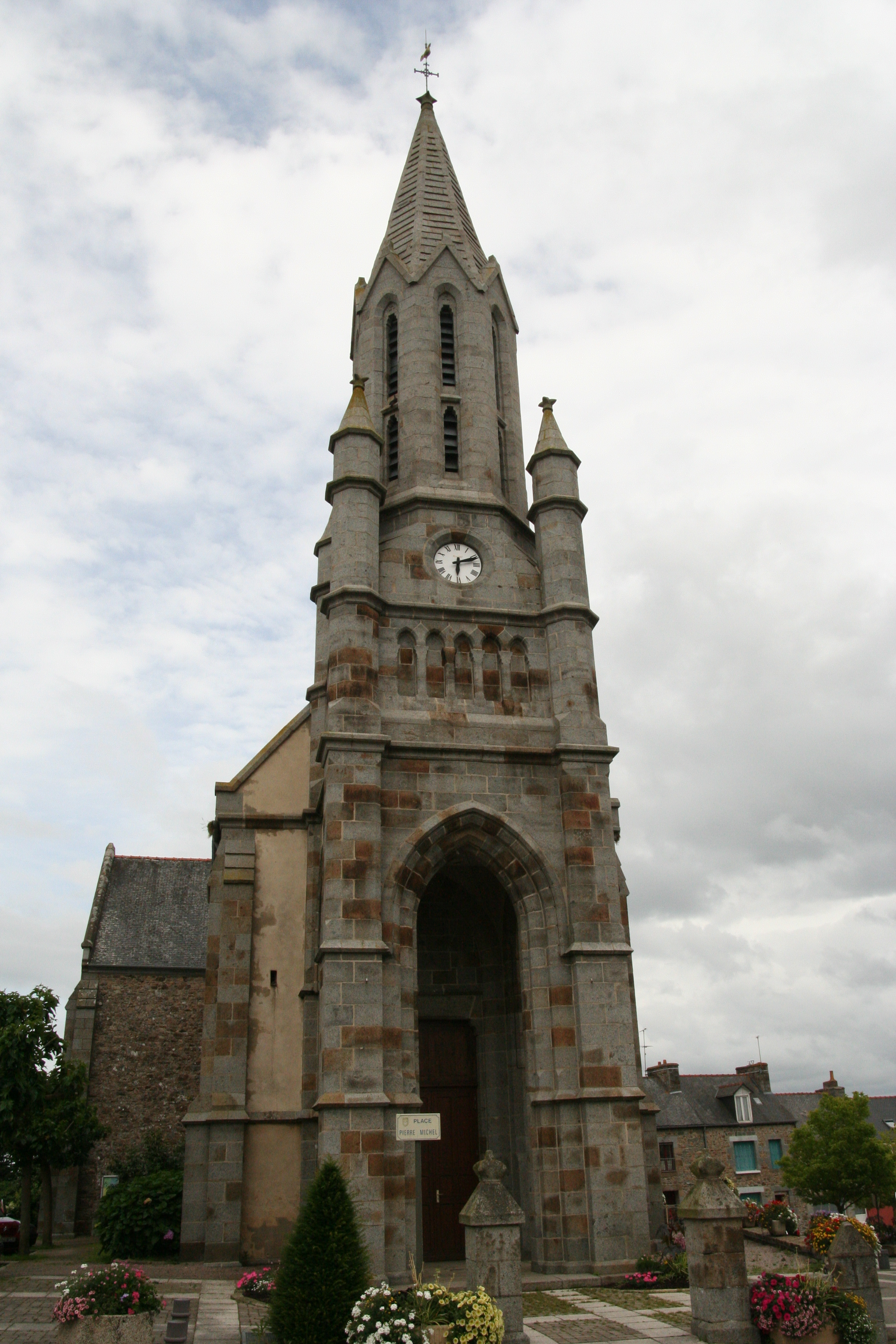
- The church in Trémuson

- Coat of arms
- Location of Trémuson
- Location within France Location within Brittany
- Coordinates: 48°31′29″N 2°50′54″W
- Country: France
- Region: Brittany
- Department: Côtes-d'Armor
- Arrondissement: Saint-Brieuc
- Canton: Plérin
- Intercommunality: Saint-Brieuc Armor

Government
  - Mayor (2020–2026): Yvon Orgebin
- Area^{1}: 6.31 km^{2} (2.44 sq mi)
- Highest elevation: 163 m (535 ft)
- Lowest elevation: 30 m (98 ft)
- Population (2023): 2,259
  - Density: 358/km^{2} (927/sq mi)
- Time zone: UTC+01:00 (CET)
  - Summer (DST): UTC+02:00 (CEST)
- INSEE/Postal code: 22372 /22440
- ^{1} French Land Register data, which excludes lakes, ponds, glaciers > 1 km^{2} (0.386 sq mi or 247 acres) and river estuaries.

Trémuson (French pronunciation: [tʁemyzɔ̃]; Breton: Tremuzon) is a commune in the Côtes-d'Armor department of Brittany in northwestern France.

== Population ==
Inhabitants of Trémuson are called trémusonnais in French.

Historical population
Year	Pop.	±% p.a.
1968	778	—
1975	1,013	+3.84%
1982	1,168	+2.05%
1990	1,482	+3.02%
1999	1,684	+1.43%
2007	1,807	+0.89%
2012	1,963	+1.67%
2017	2,069	+1.06%
2023	2,259	+1.48%
Source: INSEE

== See also ==
- Communes of the Côtes-d'Armor department
