= Plérin =

Plérin Plerin (Breton)
- Commune
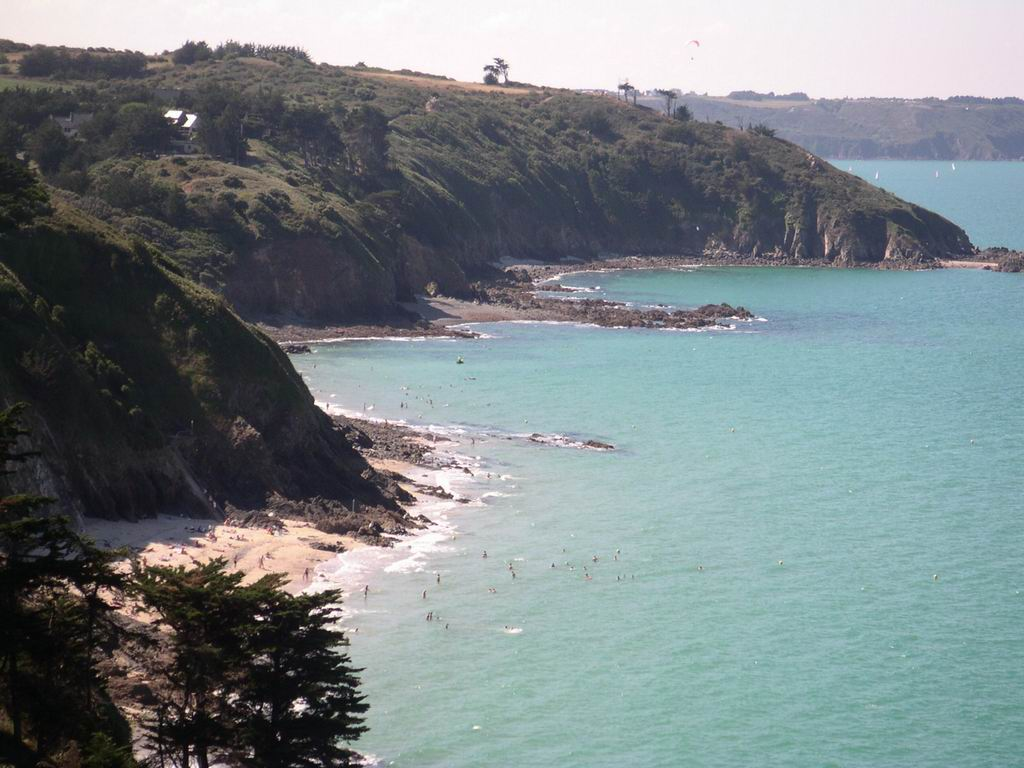
- Martin beach, Plérin

- Flag Coat of arms
- Location of Plérin
- Location within France Location within Brittany
- Coordinates: 48°32′07″N 2°46′10″W
- Country: France
- Region: Brittany
- Department: Côtes-d'Armor
- Arrondissement: Saint-Brieuc
- Canton: Plérin
- Intercommunality: Saint-Brieuc Armor

Government
  - Mayor (2020–2026): Ronan Kerdraon
- Area^{1}: 27.72 km^{2} (10.70 sq mi)
- Highest elevation: 143 m (469 ft)
- Lowest elevation: 0 m (0 ft)
- Population (2023): 14,425
  - Density: 520.4/km^{2} (1,348/sq mi)
- Time zone: UTC+01:00 (CET)
  - Summer (DST): UTC+02:00 (CEST)
- INSEE/Postal code: 22187 /22190
- ^{1} French Land Register data, which excludes lakes, ponds, glaciers > 1 km^{2} (0.386 sq mi or 247 acres) and river estuaries.

Plérin (French pronunciation: [pleʁɛ̃]; Breton: Plerin; Gallo: Plérein) is a coastal commune in the Côtes-d'Armor department of Brittany in northwestern France. The Marché du Porc Breton, located in Plérin, is where the price of pork is set for retailers across France.

== Population ==
Inhabitants of Plérin are called plérinais in French.

Historical population

Year	Pop.	±% p.a.
1793	3,818	—
1800	3,228	−2.37%
1806	3,609	+1.88%
1821	3,884	+0.49%
1831	4,896	+2.34%
1836	4,875	−0.09%
1841	4,887	+0.05%
1846	4,939	+0.21%
1851	5,661	+2.77%
1856	5,817	+0.55%
1861	5,962	+0.49%
1866	6,178	+0.71%
1872	6,160	−0.05%
1876	5,664	−2.08%
1881	5,809	+0.51%
1886	5,466	−1.21%
1891	5,346	−0.44%
1896	5,086	−0.99%
1901	5,186	+0.39%

Year	Pop.	±% p.a.
1906	5,304	+0.45%
1911	5,397	+0.35%
1921	4,977	−0.81%
1926	5,206	+0.90%
1931	5,238	+0.12%
1936	5,288	+0.19%
1946	6,370	+1.88%
1954	6,779	+0.78%
1962	7,623	+1.48%
1968	8,780	+2.38%
1975	9,757	+1.52%
1982	10,559	+1.13%
1990	12,108	+1.73%
1999	12,512	+0.37%
2007	13,512	+0.97%
2012	14,224	+1.03%
2017	14,062	−0.23%
2023	14,425	+0.43%

Source: EHESS and INSEE (1968-2023)

== See also ==
- Communes of the Côtes-d'Armor department
- Élie Le Goff Sculptor of Plérin's war memorial
