= Eva =

Eva or EVA may refer to:

- Eva (name), a feminine given name

== Arts, entertainment, and media ==
=== Fictional characters ===
- Eva (Dynamite Entertainment), a comic book character
- Eva (Devil May Cry), in the Devil May Cry video game series
- Eva (Metal Gear), in the Metal Gear video games series
- Eva Mapendo, in 2018 romantic drama series Ngayon at Kailanman, portrayed by Julia Barretto
- Evangelion (mecha), in the Neon Genesis Evangelion franchise

=== Films ===
- Eva (1935 film), an Austrian film
- Eva (1948 film), a Swedish film
- Eva (1953 film), a Greek drama film
- Eva (1958 film), an Austrian film
- Eva (1962 film), a French-Italian film in English
- Eva (2010 film), an English-language Romanian film
- Eva (2011 film), a Spanish film
- Eva (2018 film), a French film
- Eva (2023 film), a Malaysian film

=== Music ===
==== Artists ====
- Eva (singer), German pop singer (1943-2020)
- Eva Narcissus Boyd (Little Eva), American singer (1943–2003)
- Banda Eva, a Brazilian axé band

==== Musical works ====
- Eva (opera) (1899), by Josef Bohuslav Foerster
- Eva (operetta) (1911), by Franz Lehár
- "Eva" (Nightwish song), 2007
- "Eva" (Umberto Tozzi song), 1982
- "Eva", a song by Lisandro Cuxi
- "Eva", a song by Orgy on their album Vapor Transmission (2000)
- "Eva", a song by Vintage on their album Sex (2009)
- "E.V.A.", a song by Jean-Jacques Perrey from the album Moog Indigo (1970)
- "E.V.A.", a song by Public Service Broadcasting from the album The Race for Space (2015)
- "Eva", an album by Kadril (1999)

=== Other media ===
- Eva (Italian magazine), a women's magazine published between 1933 and 1968
- Eva (Norwegian magazine), published from 2004 to 2009
- Eva (novel), a 1988 book by Peter Dickinson
- Neon Genesis Evangelion (franchise), an anime and manga series

== Businesses and organizations ==
- EVA Air, a Taiwan-based airline and its designator
- Electric Vehicle Association of Great Britain, founded 1938
- English Volleyball Association, the former name of Volleyball England, the controlling body for volleyball in that country

== Places ==
=== Greece ===
- Eva (Cynuria), a town of ancient Cynuria
- Eva, Arcadia

=== United States ===
- Eva, Alabama
- Eva, Louisiana
- Eva, Oklahoma
- Eva, Tennessee
  - Eva (archaeological site), near Eva, Tennessee
- Eva, West Virginia

=== Elsewhere ===
- Eva, Samoa

== Science and technology ==
=== Biology and healthcare ===
- Eva (apple), an apple variety
- EVA (benchmark), an evaluation of protein structure prediction
- Eva (moth), a moth genus
- Electric vacuum aspiration, a form of abortion
- Enlarged vestibular aqueduct, a deformity of the inner ear

=== Computing ===
- Electronic voice alert, a voice synthesizer for automobiles
- Enterprise Virtual Array, HP StorageWorks storage products

=== Economics ===
- Earned Value Analysis, a measurement of project progress
- Economic value added, an estimate of a firm's profit

=== Other uses in science and technology ===
- EVA (howitzer), a Slovak self-propelled gun
- 164 Eva, an asteroid
- Ethylene-vinyl acetate, a polymer used in athletic materials
- Extravehicular activity, work done by an astronaut outside of a spacecraft
- Extreme Value Analysis, a branch of statistics concerned with extreme value theory

== Transport ==
- Eva (sternwheeler), an 1894 sternwheel steamboat
- Eva (transport), a proposed Spanish rail service

== Other uses ==
- Extensible Voynich Alphabet (formerly European Voynich Alphabet), a transcription system for the Voynich manuscript
- Eva (social network), a video social network
- EVA Conferences (Electronic Visualisation and the Arts)
- Storm Eva, a 2015 windstorm in northwestern Europe

== See also ==
- EVAS Air, a Canadian aviation services company
- Eve (disambiguation)
- Eeva
