= 1976 Birthday Honours =

Awards list for the Commonwealth

The Queen's Birthday Honours 1976 were appointments in many of the Commonwealth realms of Queen Elizabeth II to various orders and honours to reward and highlight good works by citizens of those countries. They were published on 4 June 1976 for the United Kingdom, Australia, New Zealand, Mauritius, Fiji, the Bahamas, Grenada, and Papua New Guinea. These were the first Birthday Honours on the advice of Papua New Guinean Ministers for Papua New Guinea, as the nation had gained independence from Australia on 16 September 1975.

The recipients of honours are displayed here as they were styled before their new honours (and any subsequent honours), and arranged by honour, with classes (Knight, Knight Grand Cross, etc.) and then divisions (Military, Civil, etc.) as appropriate.

At this time honours for Australians were still being awarded in the UK honours on the advice of the premiers of Australian states, as well as in the new Australian honours system which had been established in the previous year.

At this time the two lowest classes of the Royal Victorian Order were "Member (fourth class)" and "Member (fifth class)", both with post-nominals MVO. "Member (fourth class)" was renamed "Lieutenant" (LVO) from the 1985 New Year Honours onwards.

== United Kingdom ==
=== Life peers ===
==== Baroness ====
- Barbara Mary, Lady Jackson, D.B.E., President, International Institute for Environment and Development.

==== Baron ====
- Sir Philip Allen, G.C.B., For public services.
- Professor Asa Briggs, Vice-Chancellor, University of Sussex.
- Edward Benjamin Britten, O.M., C.H., Composer.

=== Privy Counsellor ===
- Michael Francis Lovell Cocks, M.P., Parliamentary Secretary to the Treasury.
- Reginald Freeson, M.P., Minister for Housing and Construction, Department of the Environment.
- Henry Oscar Murton, O.B.E., T.D., M.P., Chairman of Ways and Means, House of Commons.
- David Anthony Llewellyn Owen, M.P., Minister of State, Department of Health and Social Security.

=== Knight Bachelor ===
- William Sydney Albert Atkins, C.B.E., Chairman, W. S. Atkins Group. For services to Export.
- Group Captain Douglas Robert Steuart Bader, C.B.E., D.S.O., D.F.C. For services to disabled people.
- William John Granville Beynon, C.B.E., F.R.S., Professor of Physics, University College of Wales.
- Frederic Bernard Bolton, M.C. For services to the shipping industry.
- Graham MacGregor Bull, Director, Clinical Research Centre, Northwick Park, Medical Research Council.
- Richard Guy Cave, M.C., Chairman, Smiths Industries Ltd.
- James Ogilvy Blair-Cunynghame, O.B.E., Chairman, National and Commercial Banking Group Ltd.
- John Christopher Donne, Chairman, South East Thames Regional Health Authority.
- Robert McCallum Douglas, O.B.E., Chairman, Robert M. Douglas Holdings Ltd. For services to Export.
- Herbert Frank Cobbold Ereaut, Bailiff of Jersey.
- Harold Josiah Finch. For public services in Wales.
- Douglas George Horace Frank, Q.C., President of the Lands Tribunal.
- Professor Otto Kahn-Freund, F.B.A., Q.C. For services to labour law.
- Arthur Ernest Hawkins, Chairman, Central Electricity Generating Board.
- Horace William Heyman, Chairman, English Industrial Estates Corporation.
- George Henry Kenyon, D.L., Chairman of Council, University of Manchester.
- Denys Louis Lasdun, C.B.E., Architect.
- Frank Henry Burland Willoughby Layfield, Q.C., Chairman, Committee of Inquiry into Local Government Finance.
- Edmund Naylor Liggins, T.D., President of The Law Society.
- Francis Wingate William Pemberton, C.B.E. For services to agriculture.
- Robert James Philipson, President, Royal Scottish Academy.
- Frederick William Pontin. For charitable services.
- John Emms Read, Chairman, EMI Group of Companies.
- George Sharp, O.B.E. For services to local government in Scotland.
- James Cheseborough Swaffield, C.B.E., R.D., Director-General and Clerk, Greater London Council.
- Roger John Massy Swynnerton, C.M.G., O.B.E., M.C., lately Agricultural Adviser, Commonwealth Development Corporation.
- Geoffrey Wilkinson, F.R.S., Professor of Inorganic Chemistry, Imperial College of Science and Technology, University of London.
- Frederic Calland Williams, C.B.E., F.R.S., Professor of Electrical Engineering (Electro Technics), University of Manchester.
- Professor Robert Evan Owen Williams, Director, Public Health Laboratory Service.
- Rowland Sydney Wright, C.B.E., Chairman, Imperial Chemical Industries Ltd. For services to Export.
- Brian Walter Mark Young, Director General, Independent Broadcasting Authority.

==== Australian States ====
State of New South Wales

- Colin Joseph Hines, O.B.E. For services to ex-servicemen.
- Neville Drake Pixley, M.B.E., V.R.D. For services to the community.

State of Victoria

- The Honourable Mr Justice John Erskine Starke, of Mount Eliza. For distinguished service to Victoria.
- Ian Jeffreys Wood, M.B.E., of Toorak. For services to medicine.

State of Queensland

- Francis Joseph McAvoy, C.B.E., of Daradgee. For his contribution to agriculture and to the development of the Queensland and Australian sugar industry.
- The Honourable Wallace Alexander Ramsey Rae, Agent-General for Queensland in London.

State of Western Australia

- The Honourable William Stewart Bovell, J.P., of Busselton. For long and outstanding service to Western Australia.

=== Order of the Bath ===
==== Knight Grand Cross of the Order of the Bath (GCB) ====
- Admiral Sir Terence Lewin, K.C.B., M.V.O., D.S.C., A.D.C.
- General Sir Roland Gibbs, K.C.B., C.B.E., D.S.O., M.C., late Infantry, Colonel Commandant The Parachute Regiment, Colonel Commandant 2nd Battalion The Royal Green Jackets.
- Air Chief Marshal Sir Neil Cameron, K.C.B., C.B.E., D.S.O., D.F.C., Royal Air Force.

==== Knight Commander of the Order of the Bath (KCB) ====
- Vice Admiral Peter Murray Austin.
- Lieutenant General Peter John Frederick Whiteley, O.B.E.
- Lieutenant General Arthur John Archer, O.B.E., late Infantry.
- Lieutenant General Richard Edward Worsley, O.B.E., late Royal Armoured Corps.
- Air Marshal Richard Gordon Wakeford, M.V.O., O.B.E., A.F.C., Royal Air Force.
- Acting Air Marshal Alexander McKay Sinclair Steedman, C.B., C.B.E., D.F.C., Royal Air Force.
- William Robert Cox, C.B., Chief Executive, Property Services Agency, Department of the Environment.
- Hywel Wynn Evans, C.B., Permanent Secretary, Welsh Office.
- John Garlick, C.B., Second Permanent Secretary, Cabinet Office.
- William Geraghty, C.B., Second Permanent Secretary, Ministry of Defence.

==== Companion of the Order of the Bath (CB) ====
Military Division

- Rear Admiral Herbert Gardner.
- Rear Admiral David Hepworth.
- Rear Admiral Sefton Ronald Sandford.
- Major General David Crichton Alexander.
- Major General John Geoffrey Robyn Allen, late Royal Armoured Corps, Colonel Commandant Royal Tank Regiment.
- Major General Kenneth Hall, O.B.E., late Royal Army Educational Corps.
- Major General John McGhie, Q.H.P., late Royal Army Medical Corps.
- Major General Thomas Anthony Richardson, M.B.E., late Royal Regiment of Artillery.
- Major General Henry Ernest Roper, late Royal Corps of Signals, Colonel Commandant Royal Corps of Signals.
- Air Vice-Marshal Charles Melvin Gibbs, C.B.E., D.F.C., Royal Air Force.
- Air Vice-Marshal Charles Gilbert Maughan, C.B.E., A.F.C., Royal Air Force.
- Air Vice-Marshal George Edwin Thirlwall, Royal Air Force.
- Air Commodore Arthur Sidney Ronald Strudwick, D.F.C., Royal Air Force (Retired).

Civil Division

- Lawrence Airey, Deputy Secretary, H.M. Treasury.
- Harry Munro Archibald, M.B.E., Deputy Secretary, Department of Health and Social Security.
- Michael Thomas Emilius Clayton, O.B.E., Principal Director, Ministry of Defence.
- Andrew James Collier, Deputy Secretary, Department of Health and Social Security.
- Alfred Hyam Dalton, Deputy Chairman, Board of Inland Revenue.
- Frederick Harold Dean, Judge Advocate General of Her Majesty's Forces.
- George Lawrence Jose Engle, Parliamentary Counsel.
- John Michael Evelyn, Assistant Director of Public Prosecutions.
- John Graham, lately Under Secretary, Ministry of Agriculture, Fisheries and Food.
- Norman Hancock, lately Director of Warship Design, Ministry of Defence.
- Peter Le Cheminant, Deputy Secretary, Department of Energy.
- William Gerald Malcolm, M.B.E., lately Permanent Secretary, Department of the Environment for Northern Ireland.
- Archibald Ralph Melville, C.M.G., lately Under Secretary, Ministry of Overseas Development.
- Maurice Milne, Deputy Director General (Highways), Department of the Environment.
- Anthony John Phelps, Deputy Chairman, Board of Customs and Excise.
- Ian Macbeth Robertson, M.V.O., Under Secretary, Scottish Education Department.
- Walter Patrick Shovelton, C.M.G., Deputy Secretary, Department of Trade.
- William Jeffrey Smith, Under Secretary, Northern Ireland Office.
- Christopher Albert Taylor, lately Inspector General, Insolvency Service, Department of Trade.

=== Order of St Michael and St George ===
==== Knight Grand Cross of the Order of St Michael and St George (GCMG) ====
- Sir Michael Walker, K.C.M.G., British High Commissioner, New Delhi.

==== Knight Commander of the Order of St Michael and St George (KCMG) ====
- Alan Hugh Campbell, C.M.G., Deputy Under-Secretary of State, Foreign and Commonwealth Office.
- Clive Martin Rose, C.M.G., Ambassador, Head of the United Kingdom Delegation to the negotiations on Mutual Reduction of Forces and Armaments and associated measures in Central Europe, Vienna.
- Nigel Clive Cosby Trench, C.M.G., H.M. Ambassador, Lisbon.
- Charles Douglas Wiggin, C.M.G., D.F.C., A.F.C., H.M. Ambassador, Madrid.

==== Companion of the Order of St Michael and St George (CMG) ====
- Kenneth George Henry Binning, Under Secretary, Department of Industry.
- Professor Leonard Jan Bruce-Chwatt, O.B.E., For services to malaria control in developing countries.
- Sue Ryder, O.B.E. (Margaret Susan, Mrs Cheshire), Founder, The Sue Ryder Foundation. For services to displaced people and refugees.
- Anne Hunter, Mrs Smallwood, Commissioner, Board of Inland Revenue.
- Anthony William Stephens, Chief Officer, Sovereign Base Areas Administration, Cyprus, Ministry of Defence.
- William James Adams, Counsellor, Office of the United Kingdom Permanent Representative to the European Communities, Brussels.
- Hugh Michael Carless, Counsellor, Foreign and Commonwealth Office.
- Stanley Gascoigne, O.B.E., Secretary to the Cabinet, Bermuda.
- Charles Sydney Rycroft Giffard, Minister, H.M. Embassy, Tokyo.
- John Moore Heath, H.M. Consul-General, Chicago.
- John William Dixon Hobley, Q.C., Attorney-General, Hong Kong.
- Cynlais Morgan James, Minister, H.M. Embassy, Paris.
- John Charles Moir Mason, Assistant Under-Secretary of State, Foreign and Commonwealth Office.
- Richard Neil Posnett, O.B.E., lately Governor and Commander-in-Chief, Belize.
- Peregrine Alexander Rhodes, Assistant Under-Secretary of State, Cabinet Office.
- Barry Granger Smallman, C.V.O., British High Commissioner, Dacca.
- Robert Sneddon, M.B.E., Counsellor, Foreign and Commonwealth Office.
- Henry Steel, O.B.E., Legal Counsellor, United Kingdom Mission to the United Nations, New York.
- John Stainton Whitehead, Counsellor, Foreign and Commonwealth Office.

===== Australian States =====
State of New South Wales

- William Ernest Henry, Under-Secretary and Comptroller of Accounts, New South Wales Treasury.

State of Victoria

- Reginald Jackson, Q.P.M., J.P., Chief Commissioner, Victoria Police.

State of Queensland

- James Richard Lambert Hyne, of Maryborough. For his contribution to the community and to the timber industry.

State of Western Australia

- Laurence Charles Brodie-Hall, of Gooseberry Hill. For services to mining and associated development and to the community.

=== Royal Victorian Order ===
==== Knight Commander of the Royal Victorian Order (KCVO) ====
- Major Sir Ralph Hugo Anstruther, Bt, C.V.O., M.C.
- The Right Reverend William Launcelot Scott Fleming, D.D.
- Wilfred William Hill Hill-Wood, C.B.E.
- Philip Brian Cecil Moore, C.B., C.M.G.

==== Commander of the Royal Victorian Order (CVO) ====
- Henry Barraclough, M.V.O.
- Geoffrey de Bellaigue, M.V.O.
- Christopher Robert Vesey Holt, V.R.D.
- Frank Ernest Rehder.
- Colonel Kenneth Edward Savill, D.S.O.
- Captain Michael Neville Tufnell, D.S.C., Royal Navy.

==== Member of the Royal Victorian Order (MVO) ====
Fourth Class

- Gordon Herbert Franklin, M.V.O.
- Veronica Jane Langton, M.V.O.
- Captain James Duncan Millar, The Black Watch.
- Mona Mitchell.
- Commander Michael Edward Ortmans, Royal Navy.
- Miss Muriel Audrey Russell.

Fifth Class

- James Michael Carlisle.
- Ernest Arthur Day.
- Trevor Hope Martin Edwards, M.B.E.
- George Cornelius Felgate.
- John Charles Ghost.
- Miss Jean Godden.
- Michael George Paul Kelly.
- Henry Klokow.
- Superintendent Raymond Jack Lovejoy, Thames Valley Police.
- Thomas William Lowe.
- Squadron Leader (Acting Wing Commander) John William Mair, Royal Air Force.
- Regimental Sergeant Major Tom Taylor, M.B.E., Grenadier Guards.

==== Royal Victorian Medal (Silver) (RVM) ====
- Ivor John William Crimp.
- William Reginald Douglas.
- Sergeant Terence John Holmes, Royal Air Force Regiment.
- Henrietta Cecilia, Mrs Hopwood.
- John David Herbert Jones.
- Police Constable Harry Lane, Metropolitan Police.
- Yeoman Bed Hanger James Marshall, Her Majesty's Bodyguard of the Yeomen of the Guard.
- Walter Matthews.
- Police Constable Richard Gibson Routledge, Metropolitan Police.
- Maurice Saunders.
- Arnold James Spear.
- John Kenneth Wood.

=== Order of the British Empire ===
==== Knight Grand Cross of the Order of the British Empire (GBE) ====
- Sir Crawford Murray MacLehose, K.C.M.G., K.C.V.O., M.B.E., Governor and Commander-in-Chief, Hong Kong.

==== Dame Commander of the Order of the British Empire (DBE) ====
- Professor Elizabeth Mary Hill. For services to Slavonic Studies.
- Violet Penelope, Mrs Dickson, C.B.E. For long and distinguished services to Anglo-Kuwaiti relations.

===== Australian States =====
State of New South Wales

- Monica Josephine, Mrs Gallagher. For services to the community.

==== Knight Commander of the Order of the British Empire (KBE) ====
- Vice Admiral Philip Alexander Watson, M.V.O.
- Acting Air Marshal Herbert Durkin, C.B., Royal Air Force.
- Henry George Reginald Molyneux, Lord Porchester, D.L., Chairman, Hampshire County Council and South East Economic Planning Council.
- Donald Colin Cumyn Luddington, C.M.G., C.V.O., Governor, Solomon Islands.
- James Wilson Macmillan, C.B.E., J.P. For public and community services in Belize.
- John Rupert Hunt Thouron, C.B.E., For services to Anglo-American relations.

===== Australian States =====
State of Victoria

- James Adam Louis Matheson, C.M.G., M.B.E., of South Yarra. For services to education and the State.

State of Western Australia

- Hector Hamilton Stewart, of Crawley. For services to medicine and the community.

==== Commander of the Order of the British Empire (CBE) ====
Military Division

Royal Navy

- Captain Leslie William Bartlett.
- Captain John Richard Cox Johnston.
- Commodore George Armand de Gavardie Kitchin.
- Captain Anthony Albert Murphy.
- Commodore Desmond Hamilton Stewart, R.D.*, Royal Naval Reserve.

Army

- Brigadier John Bryan Akehurst (407732), late Infantry.
- Brigadier Alan David Burley (265645), late Royal Army Ordnance Corps.
- Colonel Peter Irvine Chiswell, O.B.E. (414821), late Infantry.
- Colonel Duncan Ross Green, M.C. (384213), late Infantry.
- Colonel Charles Richard Huxtable, O.B.E. (420858), late Infantry.
- Brigadier Richard Neville Wolfe Lydekker (222162), late Royal Regiment of Artillery (Now R.A.R.O.).
- Brigadier Denis Leonard Ormerod, M.B.E.(350712). late Infantry.
- Brigadier Gerald David John Robert Russell, O.B.E. (393275), late Infantry.

Royal Air Force

- Air Commodore William Keith MacTaggart, M.B.E.
- Air Commodore Thomas John Grahame Price, Q.H.P.
- Group Captain Kenneth William Hayr, A.F.C.
- Group Captain James McLuskie, D.F.M., Royal Air Force (Retired).
- Group Captain Anthony William Ringer, M.V.O., A.F.C.

Civil Division

- Alfred Evelyn Anderson, Taxing Master, and Master for the Enforcement of Judgments, Supreme Court of Northern Ireland.
- Winifred Agnes, Mrs. Andrews, Area Nursing Officer, Wolverhampton Area Health Authority.
- Norman Henry Ashton, F.R.S., Professor of Pathology, University of London.
- Reginald Bertram Bailey, Director, South-Eastern Postal Region, Post Office.
- Alan Robert Barnes, Headmaster, Ruffwood School, Kirkby.
- Gordon Vernon Bayley, President, Institute of Actuaries.
- David Beavis, Chairman, West Midlands Region, British Gas Corporation.
- Peter Dearman Birchall, D.L. lately Chairman, Gloucestershire County Council.
- Gerald Robert Boak, O.B.E., Secretary-General, Royal Air Forces Association.
- Patrick Sydney Bolshaw, Deputy Commissioner, Crown Estate Office.
- John Gibb Bothwell, O.B.E. For services to the Industrial Arbitration Board.
- Charles Anthony Boucher, O.B.E., Chairman, National Home Safety Committee, Royal Society for the Prevention of Accidents.
- Alan Bowness, Art Historian.
- William Robinson Brackett, O.B.E., T.D., President, East Midland Rent Assessment Panel.
- Eric William Henry Briault, Education Officer, Inner London Education Authority.
- Clare Burgess, Deputy Chairman, Home-Grown Cereals Authority.
- Denis Edward Clancey, Group Managing Director, Matthew Hall and Company Ltd.
- William Malpas Clarke, Director-General and Deputy Chairman, Committee on Invisible Exports. For services to Export.
- John Constable, O.B.E., Regional Works Officer, West Midlands Regional Health Authority.
- Bernard Edward Cotton, Chairman, Yorkshire and Humberside Economic Planning Council.
- Emmanuel Andrew Danino, Consultant Physician, West Glamorgan Area Health Authority.
- John Dent, O.B.E., lately President, Engineering Employers' Federation.
- George Stretton Downes, Deputy Receiver, Metropolitan Police District.
- Geoffrey Edward Dunn, lately Chairman and Managing Director, Dunn's of Bromley.
- Hugh Gwilym Ellis, Controller, Overseas Division B., British Council.
- Cecil Harry Elsom, Architect.
- Robert Alexander Fasken, Member, Highlands and Islands Development Board.
- Colonel Godfrey Edmund Fitzhugh, O.B.E., T.D. For public services in North Wales.
- Anthony Noble Frankland, D.F.C., Director General, Imperial War Museum.
- Henry Alexander Frazer. For services to the Royal Institution of Chartered Surveyors in Northern Ireland.
- Sheppard Sunderland Frere, Professor of the Archaeology of the Roman Empire, University of Oxford.
- John Linton Gardner, Composer.
- George Armin Goyder, Chairman, Board of Governors, Centre for International Briefing.
- Martin John Grafton, O.B.E., T.D., D.L., Director-General, National Federation of Building Trades Employers.
- Leslie Grainger, Member for Science, National Coal Board.
- Norman Edward Griggs, Secretary-General, Building Societies Association.
- Norman Grimshaw, Chairman, British Vita Company Ltd.
- John Currie Gunn, Cargill Professor of Natural Philosophy, University of Glasgow. Member, University Grants Committee.
- George Edward Desmond Halahan, lately Managing Director, Round Oak Steel Works Ltd.
- Professor James Snowdon Hall, Principal, West of Scotland Agricultural College.
- Stanley Burton Hallett, Assistant Secretary, Department of Education and Science.
- Ronald Halstead. For services to the food industry.
- Edward John William Hellmuth. For services to the European Trade Committee and to Export.
- Stanley Alfred Hills, District Auditor (Metropolitan) Department of the Environment.
- George Steedman Hislop. For services to the Royal Aeronautical Society.
- Reginald George Hoare, lately Chairman, Pharmaceuticals Division, Imperial Chemical Industries Ltd. For services to Export.
- David Holdsworth, Q.P.M., Chief Constable, Thames Valley Police.
- Percy Kellick Hoskins, lately Chief Crime Reporter, Daily Express, and for services to charity.
- Godfrey Newbold Hounsfield, F.R.S., Head, Medical Systems Section, Central Research Laboratories, Electric and Musical Industries Ltd.
- John Starkey Hunter, Managing Director, British Petroleum Chemicals International
- John Hardcastle Huntridge, Director, Marshall of Cambridge (Engineering) Ltd. For services to Export.
- Miss Gwyneth Jones (Mrs. Haberfeld-Jones), Singer.
- Andrew Stevenson Kerr, Chief Conciliation Officer, Department of Employment.
- Ivor Christopher Banfield Keys, Professor of Music, University of Birmingham.
- Hubert John King, Professor of Mining Engineering, University of Nottingham.
- Mark Howard Robert King, Director, National Employers' Mutual General Insurance Association Ltd,
- Philip Douglas Knights, O.B.E., Q.P.M., Chief Constable, West Midlands Police.
- Harry George Lillicrap, Chairman, Cable & Wireless
- Donald Murdo McCallum, Director and General Manager, Scotland, Ferranti Ltd.
- John Stewart McCrae, M.B.E., General Medical Practitioner, Catrine. For services to medicine in Scotland.
- Duncan McDonald, Chairman, Bruce Peebles Industries and Chief Executive, Reyrolle Parsons. For services to Export.
- Charles James MacMahon, Assistant Solicitor, Law Officers' Department.
- Michael Charles Henry MacOwan. For services to the theatre.
- Thomas Johnstone McWiggan, Director-General (Telecommunications), Civil Aviation Authority.
- Robert George Madocks, O.B.E., T.D., D.L. For welfare services in Northern Ireland.
- Miss Olivia Mary Manning (Mrs.Smith), Author.
- David Napier Matthews, O.B.E., Consultant Plastic Surgeon, University College Hospital and Hospital for Sick Children, London.
- John Spencer Mills, M.C., Chief Executive and Clerk, Essex County Council.
- Charles Patrick Milroy, lately Chief Education Officer, Gloucestershire County Council.
- John Edward Moffitt, Farmer, Northumberland.
- Miss Tanya Moiseiwitsch (Tatiana Benita, Mrs. Krish), Scene and Costume Designer for the theatre.
- Olwen Eirene, Mrs. Morgan, M.B.E. For public services in Wales.
- Alexander Morrison, Chief Executive, Thames Water Authority.
- Professor Frank Morton, O.B.E., Chairman, Navy Department Fuels and Lubricants Advisory Committee.
- James Duncan Dunbar-Nasmith. For public services in Scotland.
- Matthew Neil, Chief Executive, Glasgow Chamber of Commerce and Manufactures. For services to Export.
- Philip Harker Newman, D.S.O., M.C., Consultant Orthopaedic Surgeon, Royal National Orthopaedic Hospital.
- Albert Norton, Deputy Chairman, Rowntree Mackintosh Ltd. For services to Export.
- Roger Gilbert Opie, Member, Monopolies and Mergers Commission.
- Professor Adrian Frank Posnette, F.R.S., Director, East Malling Research Station, Agricultural Research Council.
- Charles Henry Prior, B.E.M., Assistant Secretary, Home Office.
- Maurice Stephen Rigden, Regional Treasurer, Trent Regional Health Authority.
- Richard Michael Robbins, Member of the Executive and Managing Director (Railways), London Transport Executive.
- Lieutenant-Commander William Alastair Robertson, D.S.C., R.N. (Retd.), Commissioner and General Manager, Northern Lighthouse Board.
- Robert Dewar Rolston. For public services in Northern Ireland.
- Norman Lester Rowe, Consultant in Oral and Maxillo-Facial Surgery, The Westminster Hospital, London.
- Robert Scott, Director, The Polytechnic, Wolverhampton.
- Robin Hugh Scutt, Controller, Development, Television, British Broadcasting Corporation.
- Miss Lynn Seymour, Ballet Dancer.
- Leonard Thomas Shipman, M.B.E. For services to Association Football.
- Leonard Slater. For services to the National Health Service Northern Region.
- David Douglas Rae Smith, M.C., Treasurer, Royal Institute of International Affairs.
- Thomas Victor Somerville, lately Deputy Chief Scientific Officer, Ministry of Defence.
- Godfrey Harry Stafford, Director, Rutherford Laboratory, Science Research Council.
- Robert Barren Kerr Stevenson, Keeper, National Museum of Antiquities of Scotland.
- Richard Stewart, Councillor, Strathclyde Regional Council.
- Ben Travers, A.F.C., Dramatist and Novelist.
- Professor Peter Martin Brabazon Walker, F.R.S.E., Director, Mammalian Genome Unit, Medical Research Council.
- James Westwood, Leader, Staffordshire County Council.
- James Dunn Wheelans, M.B.E., lately President, The Law Society of Scotland.
- William Whitfield, Architect.
- David Morgan Williams, Editor, West Africa.
- Francis David Kennard Williams, Assistant Secretary, Department of Health and Social Security.
- Watkin Wynn Williams, Deputy Commissioner-in-Chief, St. John Ambulance Association and Brigade.
- George Bell Young, Managing Director, East Kilbride and Stonehouse Development Corporation.

Diplomatic and Overseas List

- William Edward Anderson, O.B.E. For services to the British community in Argentina.
- David Robert Barwick, Secretary for Justice and Solicitor General, Malawi.
- Keith Leslie Batten. For medical services to the community in Jerusalem.
- Patrick John Bolton, lately Director, United Nations Secretariat (I.A.E.A.) Vienna.
- Miss Helen Edith Browne, O.B.E. For services to nursing in Kentucky.
- Mervyn Ernest Browne, lately Counsellor, H.M. Embassy, Manila.
- Oswald Victor Cheung, O.B.E., Q.C. For public services in Hong Kong.
- Alaistair Trevor Clark, M.V.O., Deputy Governor, Solomon Islands.
- The Right Reverend John Thomas Clark, Suffragan Bishop of Kingston, Jamaica.
- The Most Reverend Ernest Edwin Curtis, lately Archbishop of the Indian Ocean and Bishop of Mauritius.
- Joseph Nathaniel France, J.P. in St. Kitts-Nevis-Anguilla. For public services
- Douglas Frank Hubber. For services to British commercial interests and the British community in Uruguay.
- Horace Kadoorie, O.B.E. For public services in Hong Kong.
- Derrick Frederick Kershaw . For services to British commercial interests in Canada.
- Samuel Tedford Kidd, Commissioner in London for the Government of Hong Kong.
- Peter Gordon Lloyd, O.B.E., British Council Representative, Nigeria.
- Frank Martin. For services to the British community in Argentina.
- John Midgley. For services to Anglo-American relations in Washington.
- John Matthew Mitchell, British Council Representative, Germany.
- Nicholas Polunin. For services to Science and Anglo-Swiss relations.
- Ian Robert Price, T.D., Commissioner for Labour, Hong Kong.
- Ashley Reinhard George Raeburn. For services to British commercial interests in Japan.
- Henry Francis Reed, lately Special Assistant to Director-General G.A.T.T., Geneva.
- John Duff Ritchie, D.S.C. For services to British commercial interests in the United States.
- Harold Scarborough. For services to medical education in Nigeria.
- Samuel Eric Slater. For services to the community in St. Vincent.

===== Australian States =====
State of New South Wales

- Alan Bevly Kerrigan, Q.C. For services to law and the community.
- Kenneth Spencer May. For services paper industry.
- Joseph James Pratt. For services to education.

State of Victoria

- The Honourable Edward Raymond Meager, M.B.E., E.D., of Mount Eliza. For service as a Minister of the Crown.
- The Honourable Vernon Francis Wilcox, Q.C., of Camberwell. For service as a Minister of the Crown.

State of Queensland

- John Francis. Professor of Veterinary Preventive Medicine, University of Queensland.
- Charles Hartley Wilson, E.D., of Clayfield. For services to the legal profession and the community.

==== Officer of the Order of the British Empire (OBE) ====
Military Division

Royal Navy

- Surgeon Commander Lionel Claude Banks, Royal Navy.
- Major Samuel Robert Cockcroft Bemrose, Royal Marines.
- Commander William John Carter, Royal Navy.
- Commander John Goodchild, Royal Navy.
- Commander Frederick Hefford, D.S.C., A.F.C., Royal Navy.
- Commander Colin John Nicholl, Royal Navy.
- Commander Lionel Frederick Pole, Royal Navy.
- Commander Christopher Alan Woolger Russell, Royal Navy.
- Commander Trevor Royle Shaw, Royal Navy.
- Lieutenant Colonel Richard Charles Sidwell, Royal Marines.
- Commander (I) John Ernest Taylor, Royal Navy.
- Commander James Michael Burnard Walkey, Royal Navy.
- Lieutenant Commander Jeremy George Savile Widdicombe, Royal Navy.

Army

- Lieutenant-Colonel Robert Adam Bell (373617), Royal Regiment of Artillery.
- Lieutenant-Colonel John Gonzalvo de Cordova (420822), The King's Own Royal Border Regiment.
- Lieutenant-Colonel (Local Colonel) Stuart Albert Green (424997), The Royal Anglian Regiment.
- Lieutenant-Colonel Alfred Peter Maxwell Hole (424356), Royal Regiment of Artillery.
- Lieutenant-Colonel William Peter Howells, T.D., D.L. (412872), Royal Corps of Transport, Territorial and Army Volunteer Reserve.
- Lieutenant-Colonel Thomas Edward Hinings Huggan (349116), Royal Tank Regiment.
- Lieutenant-Colonel (Acting Colonel) John Hartley Learmont (433171), Royal Horse Artillery.
- Lieutenant-Colonel (Now Colonel) William Cameron Moffat (438315), Royal Army Medical Corps.
- Lieutenant-Colonel Colin Harwood Rogers (469221), Royal Army Ordnance Corps.
- Lieutenant-Colonel Robin Frederick Sadlier, T.D. (440505), The Royal Irish Rangers (27th (Inniskilling) 83rd and 87th), Territorial and Army Volunteer Reserve.
- Lieutenant-Colonel Jonathan William Salusbury-Trelawney (437161), Coldstream Guards.
- Lieutenant-Colonel (Director of Music) Trevor le Mare Sharpe, M.B.E. (469809), Coldstream Guards.
- Lieutenant-Colonel Ian Charles Slater (433240), Class 2 (Acting Corps of Royal Engineers.
- Lieutenant-Colonel John Robin Stephenson (414988), The Queen's Regiment.
- Lieutenant-Colonel (Acting) Joseph Thomas (374139), Combined Cadet Force, Territorial and Army Volunteer Reserve.
- Lieutenant-Colonel John Logan Wilson-Smith (372318), The Royal Scots (The Royal Regiment).
- Lieutenant-Colonel Keith Stephen Barnard Wintle, M.B.E. (412103), Royal Regiment of Artillery.

Royal Air Force

- Wing Commander Leslie Charles Akehurst (199049), Royal Air Force.
- Wing Commander Thomas Arthur Bennett (607005), Royal Air Force.
- Wing Commander (now Group Captain) John Edward Bore (4062881), Royal Air Force.
- Wing Commander Michel Jean-Claude Burton (4077039), Royal Air Force.
- Wing Commander Thomas Alan Hastings (3512189), Royal Air Force.
- Wing Commander Colin William Charles Heal, M.B.E., (505840), Royal Air Force.
- Wing Commander Edward John Nance (2725206), Royal Air Force.
- Wing Commander Brian Stansfield (3042487), Royal Air Force.
- Wing Commander Victor Arthur Stapley, M.B.E., D.F.C., (175092), Royal Air Force.
- Wing Commander Geoffrey George Thorburn (503780), Royal Air Force.
- Wing Commander Vivian Lloyd Warrington (3138536), Royal Air Force.
- Acting Wing Commander Arthur Edward Roy Davis (3036630), Royal Air Force Volunteer Reserve (Training Branch).

Civil Division

- William Appleyard, Chairman, Trustee Savings Bank of Mid-Lancashire and Merseyside.
- Geoffrey Stockdale Atkinson, lately Deputy Director, Lanchester Polytechnic, Coventry.
- Brian Harry Bailey, Secretary, South West Regional Council, Trades Union Congress.
- Philip Charles Bailey, Technical Manager (Leddicons), English Electric Valve Company Ltd.
- Richard Douglas James Baker. For services to Broadcasting.
- Robert Hunter Banks, Member, Ayrshire and Arran Health Board.
- Bertram Harold Barber, Vice-President, The Boys' Clubs of South Yorkshire and Hallamshire.
- Sydney Martin Chichester Beale. For services to the community in West Sussex.
- Derek Labey Benest, Foreign and Commonwealth Office.
- Russell Ernest Benjamin, Financial Director, Rempoy Ltd.
- Miss Rosemary Beresford. For services to Teacher Training.
- Edward Walter Berridge, Senior Planning Inspector, Department of the Environment.
- Miss Kathleen Mary Biggin, District Nursing Officer, Kensington, Chelsea and Westminster Area Health Authority.
- Robert Thomas Blair, Chief Executive, Perth and Kinross District Council.
- Clifford William Blumfield, Director, Dounreay Experimental Reactor Establishment, United Kingdom Atomic Energy Authority.
- James William George Boucher, Headmaster, Thames County Primary School, Blackpool.
- John Hedley Brock, Chairman, China Clay Council.
- Margaret Anne, Mrs. Brooke. For services to the community in Nottingham.
- Daniel Buckley, M.B.E., Projects Director, Dexion-Comino International Ltd.
- John Lawrence Timothy Buckley, District Postmaster, South Western District Office, London Postal Region, Post Office.
- Stanley William Budden, Principal, Office of Fair Trading.
- Maurice James Burke, Assistant Regional Engineer, East Anglian Regional Health Authority.
- Arthur Burns, D.S.O., Q.P.M., C.P.M., Chief Constable, Suffolk Constabulary.
- Donald Robert Burrell, Q.F.S.M., Deputy Chief Fire Officer, London Fire Brigade.
- Charles Alfred Butler, Member, Nottingham City Council.
- Graham Scott Wight Calder, Chief Mechanical and Electrical Engineer, British Railways Board.
- Miss Brenda Elizabeth Capstick, Secretary, The Museums Association.
- George Bryan Cary, Chairman, Greater Manchester Probation and After-Care Committee.
- Sylvia Mary, Lady Chancellor. For services to the Prisoners' Wives' Service.
- John Charlton, Secretary, Central National Health Service Pharmaceutical Services Negotiating Committee.
- Ralph Harry Chisholm, Senior Principal, H.M. Stationery Office.
- John Stephen Hallett Clissold. For services to 'Anglo-Lathi American understanding.
- Richard James Cole, Secretary, National Union of Holloway Friendly Societies. For services to Friendly Societies.
- Eric William John Cooper, Clerk to H.M. Attorney General.
- Kathleen Muriel, Mrs. Courtney, Headmistress, Ashfield Girls' Secondary School, Belfast.
- Doris Margaret, Mrs. Crisp, lately President, All England Women's Hockey Association.
- John Anthony Curry. For services to Ice-Skating.
- Theodore William Hadden Curtis. For services to the bread baking industry.
- Thomas John Daniel. For services to the community in Winchester and district.
- James Lauder Davidson, Conservator, Forestry Commission.
- David John Davies. For services to the community in the Rhondda.
- Evan Morydd Davies, Member, Home Office Standing Committee on Crime Prevention.
- Thomas Mervyn Davies. For services to Rugby Football in Wales.
- William John Davies, Member, Dyfed County Council.
- Henry Colin Davis, Director, Oral Hygiene Service.
- Arthur James Day, B.E.M., Director-General, Institute of Export. For services to Export.
- William Alfred Devereux, Director, Adult Literacy Resource Agency.
- John Dixey, Director, Newspaper Publishers Association.
- George Drexler, Chairman, Ofrex Group Ltd. For services to Export.
- John Stuart Dunning. For services to agricultural education in North Humberside.
- Eric Tyrell Dyke, Principal Education Officer, Higher and Further Education, Oxfordshire.
- Frank Ebbage, Depute Director, Glasgow College of Technology.
- Gordon Edmiston, M.C., Principal Collector, Board of Inland Revenue.
- William Campbell Evans, General Manager, Redditch Development Corporation.
- Oliver James Eveleigh, Member, Council of the Magistrates' Association of England and Wales.
- John Ferguson, Rector, Fraserburgh Academy.
- Karen Solveig Sinding, Mrs. Finch, Principal, Textile Conservation Centre, Hampton Court.
- Geoffrey Edward Foxcroft, Senior Science Master, Rugby School.
- John Galloway George, Prison Visitor, H.M. Prison, Edinburgh.
- Commander John Patrick Moore Godber, R.N. (Retd.) For services to the Royal Naval Sailing Association.
- Thomas William Patrick Golby. For services to education in the East Midlands.
- Miss Hannah Rachel Gould, Headmistress, Alexandra Park School, London Borough of Haringey.
- Frank Ogle Graham. For services to the community in Middlesbrough and district.
- Patricia Mary, Mrs. Gray, lately Chairman, Belfast Voluntary Welfare Society.
- William Lionel Griffiths. For services to the Health Services Whitiey Council.
- Duncan Guthrie, Director, National Fund for Research into Crippling Diseases, London.
- Arthur Charles William Haddy, Chief Recording Engineer and Director, The Decca Record Company Ltd.
- Bernard Halfpenny, General Medical Practitioner, Maidstone, Kent.
- Miss Audrey Hayward, A.R.R.C., T.D., Area Nursing Officer, Croydon Area Health Authority.
- Miss Vera Irene Hiddleston, Head of Department of Social Work, Jordanhill College of Education.
- Harold Hodgson, Deputy Assistant Commissioner, Metropolitan Police.
- Arnold Cecil Houghton, General Medical Practitioner, Hall Green, Birmingham.
- Harold Wakefield Howard, Senior Principal Scientific Officer, Plant Breeding Institute, Cambridge.
- Francis Gerard Hulme, Q.P.M., Deputy Chief Constable, Derbyshire Constabulary.
- Albion Tolson Hutchinson, Assistant Director, Road Construction Sub-Unit, West Yorkshire.
- Frederick Irwin, Chief Examiner, Board of Inland Revenue.
- Alfred Dennis Jackson, Divisional Business Executive, Rolls-Royce (1971) Ltd.
- Francis Joseph Hartley Jaekel, lately Principal Professional Technology Officer, Ministry of Defence.
- Charles Austin-Jenkins. For services to agriculture in Wales.
- Ronald Merlin Jenkins, lately Principal, Science Research Council.
- John Alun Emlyn-Jones, Secretary, South Wales Council on Alcoholism.
- Eric Katz. For services to the employment of disabled people.
- William George Victor Kember, Principal, Board of Customs and Excise.
- Frank Gordon Kinghan. For services to the community in Northern Ireland.
- John William Henry Knight, Leader, St. Edmundsbury District Council.
- Cecil Thomas Latham, Justices' Clerk, Manchester Metropolitan District.
- Frank Le Maistre. For services to the Jersey-French language.
- David Alexander Liddell, Assistant Director, Royal Ordnance Factory, Bishopton, Ministry of Defence.
- John Willis Little, lately Principal, Ministry of Defence.
- James McCutcheon, Industrial Relations Consultant, Bristol Engine Division, Rolls-Royce (1971) Ltd.
- Duncan McIntosh, A.F.C. For services to the community in the Highlands and Islands of Scotland.
- The Right Honourable John, Viscount Mackintosh of Halifax, B.E.M., Chairman, Norfolk County Savings Committee.
- Miss Jessie Gunn Miller Main, Registrar, General Nursing Council for Scotland.
- Cyril Frederick Marshall, B.E.M., Manager, Edmund Schluter and Company (London) Ltd.
- Andrew Menzies, Area Manager, Highland Area, North of Scotland Hydro-Electric Board.
- John George Leopold Michel, Senior Principal Scientific Officer, National Physical Laboratory.
- Leslie Frederick Miller, Commercial Director, Generation Development and Construction Division, Central Electricity Generating Board.
- Miss Lillian Moore, M.B.E., lately Director of Education, English Speaking Union of the Commonwealth.
- Eric Morecambe (John Eric Bartholomew), Comedian.
- Geoffrey Thomas Monckton De Mallet Morgan, M.C., lately Controller, Information Services, British Broadcasting Corporation.
- Percy Edwin Morrell, Principal Professional Technology Officer, Quality Assurance Directorate, Ministry of Defence.
- Cyril Henry Murkin, For services to the City of London.
- Stella Mary, Mrs. Newton. For services to the history of dress in Art.
- John Norval Depute Director of Environmental Health, City of Edinburgh District.
- Ronald Orchard, Senior Principal, Department of Health and Social Security.
- Mary, Mrs. Oxley, Headmistress, Cudworth Secondary School, Barnsley.
- Lieutenant-Colonel James Andrew Paterson, D.L., President, Llandrindod Wells Branch, Royal British Legion.
- Maurice Smylie Patrick, lately Senior Medical Officer, Belfast, Department of Health and Social Security.
- Fred Pearson, Procurement Officer and Establishment Officer, United Kingdom Treasury and Supply Delegation, Washington.
- Lawrence Gordon Pearson, Chairman and Managing Director, G. M. Pearson and Son Ltd.
- James Phoenix, Member, Cheshire County Council.
- Sidney Thomas Pickup, Vice-Chairman, Northumberland County Council.
- Frank Kenneth Pointon, Director, Southern Region, National Bus Company.
- Hugh Mortimer Pollard, Principal, St. Martin's College, Lancaster.
- Edward Percy Pollitzer, Chairman, London Opera Centre for Advanced Training and Development Ltd.
- Ronald James Post, Assistant Director, Cyclotron Unit, Medical Research Council.
- Roger Powell, Bookbinder.
- Harry Tomkinson Price, Engineering Manager, Brush Electrical Machines Ltd., Loughborough.
- Alfred Midwood Proffit, M.B.E. For services to the Soldiers', Sailors' and Airmen's Families Association in Merseyside.
- John Pugh, Area Chiropodist, Avon Area Health Authority.
- Miss Kate Rackham, Deputy General Secretary, Invalid Children's Aid Association.
- Donald Arthur Ray, Headmaster, Turney School, Dulwich.
- James Michael Renshall, Technical Director, Institute of Chartered Accountants in England and Wales.
- Edmund Patrick Rich, Quality Manager, Aviation Division, Dunlop Ltd.
- Frank Kenneth Rickwood, President and Chief Executive, BP Alaska, British Petroleum Ltd.
- Hubert Carlyon Riddett, Principal, Department of Education and Science.
- Richard Henry Roberts, Member, Gwynedd County Council.
- Lieutenant-Colonel Charles Nicholas Robin, M.C., Secretary, Northern Ireland Territorial Auxiliary and Volunteer Reserve Association.
- Miss Juanita Bennet Rule, Director of Education, Institute of Advanced Nursing Education, Royal College of Nursing, London.
- Katharine Frances, Mrs. Russell, Researcher, London School of Economics. For services to social work training.
- George Chapman Rylands, T.D., D.L., Chairman, Board of Visitors, H.M. Prison, Appleton Thorn, Warrington.
- Wolfe Sacharin, Chief Quantity Surveyor, Department of the Environment, Northern Ireland.
- Abul Fatah Akram Sayeed, Member, Community Relations Commission.
- Harry Scholes, M.B.E., Chairman, National Educational Savings Committee.
- John Frederick Sebire, Chairman, Berisfords Ltd.
- Alfred George Sellers, Director of Horticulture, National Farmers' Union.
- Michael Shawcross, Chief Executive, Woking Borough Council.
- Robert Sherry, Chairman, Hamilton District Council.
- Frederick Vivian Simpson, Chairman, Northern Ireland Local Government Staff Commission.
- George James Skelton, Chairman and Managing Director, Pickfords Removals Ltd.
- Oliver Edward Frank Slaney, Superintending Architect, Property Services Agency, Department of the Environment.
- Lawrence Joseph Smith, National Secretary, Passenger Services Group, Transport and General Workers Union.
- Michael John Knight Smith. For services to Cricket.
- Sydney Arthur Smith. For services to the community in the City of Bath.
- Max Smollett, Chief Development Engineer, Semiconductors and Integrated Circuits, Mullard Ltd.
- Harold Frederick Spanton, Chairman, Merchant Navy Welfare Board.
- Albert Craig Spencer, Executive Director, Production, Hawker Siddeley Aviation, Brough.
- Thomas William Spencer, Cricket Umpire.
- Ailsa, Mrs, Stanley, Chairman, Steering Committee for Distribution and Consumer Interests, Metrication Board.
- Ralph Alan Stephenson, Principal Officer, Department of Trade.
- Alexander Lindsay Stewart, Managing Director, Ethicon Ltd., Edinburgh. For services to Export.
- John Cecil Stillman, Architect.
- Louis Maurice Benen-Stock, Member, Surrey County Council.
- Richard Vernon Stokes, Chairman, Football Association Disciplinary Committee.
- John Patteson Strong, Chairman, Strong and Fisher (Holdings) Ltd. For services to Export.
- Alexander Richard Trotter Stuart, Technical Adviser, Ministry of Defence.
- Kenneth Terence Sturgess, Chairman, Ulster Weaving Company Ltd. Group of Companies.
- Joan Kennedy Sutherland (Mrs. Mathers), General Medical Practitioner, Edinburgh.
- John Swan, Secretary, West Midlands Region, British Gas Corporation.
- Robert Martin Taylor, Editorial Director, Croydon Advertiser Ltd.
- Frederick George Thomas, Assistant Director-General, St. John Ambulance Brigade.
- Professor Harry Thorpe, President, National Society of Leisure Gardeners.
- Thomas Edward Roland Torrance, Director, Crane and Deck Machinery Group, Stothert and Pitt Ltd.
- Geoffrey Charles Trout, lately Principal Scientific Officer, Ministry of Agriculture, Fisheries and Food.
- Albert Roy Truman, Senior Inspector, Inner London Education Authority.
- Doris Susan, Mrs. Varah, Central President, The Mothers' Union.
- Philip William Varcoe, Chairman and Founder Member, The Cornish Spastic Society.
- Nancy Edith, Mrs. Wallace, M.B.E., lately Foreign and Commonwealth Office.
- Stanley Victor Warren, Director, Ship Mortgage Finance Company Ltd.
- Humphrey Fairclough Watson, D.F.C., Director, North East Area, National Coal Board.
- Hugh Richard James Webster, T.D., Senior Partner, Savills. For services to the Royal Hospital, Chelsea.
- Henry James Cyril Weighell, Director, Legislation and Technical Liaison, Chrysler U.K. Ltd.
- Miss Emily Elizabeth White, General Secretary, Manchester Council for Voluntary Service.
- Mervyn Harries White, lately Assistant Director and Secretary, Cotton Research Corporation.
- Diana Carter, Mrs. Williams, President, Wiltshire Branch, British Red Cross Society.
- William Thomas Wing, Area Pharmaceutical Officer, Newcastle (Teaching) Area Health Authority.
- Dorothy, Mrs. Winton. For services to the magistracy in the Commonwealth.
- Ernie Wise (Ernest Wiseman), Comedian.
- Rowland Ernest Woodward, M.B.E., lately Director of Administration, North-West Water Authority.
- Alan Wharton Wright, T.D., Director, W. and H. Williams Ltd.
- Donald Burn Wright, Chief Test Pilot, Short Brothers and Harland Ltd., Belfast.
- John Wilfrid Wright, Deputy Director (Surveys), Ministry of Overseas Development.

Diplomatic and Overseas List

- The Reverend Doctor Harold Walter Adeney. For medical and welfare services to the community in Burundi.
- John Ernest Alcantara. For services to the Judiciary in Gibraltar.
- Ian Peter Allnutt, British Council Representative, Mexico.
- Peter Derek Antram. For services to British aviation interests and the British community in Italy.
- Anthony Green Ayre. For services to British commercial interests in Newfoundland.
- Oliver Baudert. For services to British commercial interests in Indonesia.
- Willie Betu. For services to the community in the Solomon Islands.
- William Ronald Somerville Bond, M.B.E. For services to the British community in Switzerland.
- John Foster Boyd. For services to education and the British community in Nigeria.
- Miss Beryl Mildred Bradnack. For services to education in Jerusalem.
- Reginald Graham Brown. For services to British commercial interests in Iran.
- Basil Henry Burwood-Taylor, lately Honorary British Consul, Asmara.
- Donald Skea Byers. For services to agricultural development in Sabah, Malaysia.
- Redmond Charles Carroll, H.M. Consul (Commercial), British Consulate-General, Dusseldorf.
- Manuel Cavilla, Administrator, Medical and Public Health Department, Gibraltar.
- The Reverend Canon Henry Chatfield-Jude. For services to the Church and the British community in Lisbon.
- Sir Joseph Lister Watson Cheyne, Bt., lately First Secretary (Information), H.M. Embassy, Rome.
- Charles Clark, Controller of Buildings, Ministry of Works and Supplies, Malawi.
- Douglas Reginald Collard, lately H.M. Consul-General, Bilbao.
- Miss Isabelle Pattison Cullen, M.B.E., Director, Speakers Division, British Information Services, New York.
- Brian Alwyne Marston Daborn. For services to the British community in Western India.
- Ivan Dawson. For public and community services in the British Virgin Islands.
- Thomas Kingston Derry. For services to Anglo-Norwegian cultural relations and the British community in Norway.
- The Reverend Peter Montgomery Duplock. For services to the Church and the British community in Belgium.
- Eben Evans, M.B.E., British Council Representative, Yugoslavia.
- David Robert Ford, M.V.O., Director of Information Services, Hong Kong.
- James Gaston Foster. For services to British commercial interests in Belgium.
- Harold Peter Foxon. For public services in Hong Kong.
- Captain Alfred Ernest Garbutt. For services to British commercial and shipping interests in Kenya.
- Frederick John George, M.B.E. For services to Vocational Training and the British community in Iran.
- James Blackburn Gibson. For services to medical education in Hong Kong.
- Francis Goldsmith. For services to the British community in Brazil.
- Lawrence Patrick Gutteridge. For public and community services in Bermuda.
- David Melville Hacking. For services to British commercial interests and the British community in South India.
- Brian Godwin Hartley. For services to agricultural development in Central Africa.
- George Herbert Nicholas Horsfield. For services to economic development in the West Caribbean.
- Arthur Berkley Hunter. For services to the community in the Cayman Islands.
- Siu-wah, Mrs. Kwan-Ko, M.B.E. For public services in Hong Kong.
- David Robert Leeson. For services to British commercial interests and the British community in Belgium.
- Andrew Lindsay, First Secretary and Consul H.M. Embassy, Stockholm.
- The Reverend Alexander John Maclean. For services to the Church and the British community in Rome.
- James David McGregor, I.S.O., lately Deputy Director of Commerce and Industry, Hong Kong.
- Eric Manvell Manvell, H.M. Consul, (Information), British Consulate-General, Melbourne.
- David Lindsay Millar. For services to commerce and the community in Hong Kong.
- The Reverend Doctor David Gerald Milton-Thompson. For medical and welfare services to the community in Kenya.
- Peter Lloyd Morgan, lately First Secretary, H.M. Embassy, Brussels.
- David Ian Newman, lately H.M. Consul, Palma de Mallorca, Balearic Islands.
- Kenneth Holbrook Phillips. For services to the British community in Hamburg.
- Margaret Aileen Pope, Mrs. Purvey. For welfare services to the community in Bermuda.
- Isaac Qoloni, Permanent Secretary, Ministry of Home Affairs, Solomon Islands.
- Noel Spence Reid, D.S.O., M.C., E.D. For services to the British and Commonwealth communities in Tenerife, Canary Islands.
- Richard Arthur Joseph Richardson, Q.P.M., C.P.M., Senior Assistant Commissioner, Royal Hong Kong Police Force.
- Derek Alan Joseph Rogers. For services to British commercial interests in Spain.
- The Reverend Canon Vivian Charles Ryder. For services to the Church and the British community in Buenos Aires.
- William Norris Scott. For services to the British community in the Netherlands.
- Henry Martin Shone, lately H.M. Consul, Basle, Switzerland.
- Anthony Alfred Bentley Standen, Manager, Lilongwe Land Development Project, Malawi.
- Captain Christopher Kingston Taylor, Chief Marine Officer, Ministry of Works and Public Utilities, Solomon Islands.
- Leton Felix Thomas, Acting Permanent Secretary, Ministry of Education, St. Lucia.
- Albert Henry Thurn. For services to education in Argentina.
- Michael Francis Ray Waters. For services to leprosy research in Malaysia.
- Edward George White, lately First Secretary (Administration) British High Commission, New Delhi.
- Roderick Dietloff Holmes Wilson. For services to British aviation interests in Australia.
- John Howard Wright. For services.to community and rural, development in Nigeria.
- Raymond William Harry Wright. For services to university education in Developing Countries.
- Eric Young, First Secretary and Head of Chancery, H.M. Embassy, Reykjavik.

==== Member of the Order of the British Empire (MBE) ====
Civil Division

- Arthur Bert Abrams, Member, Bristol City Council
- William Ralph Ainsworth, Inspector of Taxes (Higher Grade), Board of Inland Revenue.
- William Panahioty Air, Secretary and Chief Executive, Leicester and District Hosiery Manufacturers Association Ltd. For services to Export.
- The Reverend Leslie Robert Aitken. For services as Chaplain to The Dunkirk Veterans' Association.
- William Aitken, Chairman, Kilmarnock and Loudoun District Council.
- Miss Helen Maud Baird, Clerical Assistant/Typist, Northern Ireland Office.
- William Francis Baker, Senior Technical Information Officer, (Guided Weapons), British Aircraft Corporation Ltd.
- Margaret, Mrs. Berkley-Barton, County Organiser, West Sussex, Women's Royal Voluntary Service.
- John George Bell. For services to youth in Liverpool.
- Margaret, Mrs. Berry, Chairman, Friends of the Wiltshire Associations of Boys' Clubs and Youth Clubs.
- Percy Henry Bibby, Administrator, Wigan Area Health Authority.
- John Carruthers Billington, Superintending Engineer, Somerset Sub-Unit, South Western Road Construction Unit.
- Miss Edith May Blair, lately Divisional Children's Officer, Dr. Barnardo's Divisional Office, Horsforth, Leeds.
- Ronald Arthur Blows, lately Commercial Manager, Associated Container Transport Ltd.
- Arthur James Bode, Distribution Design and Development Engineer, Edinburgh, Fife and Borders Area, South of Scotland Electricity Board.
- James Robert Stanley Booth, Superintendent, Ordnance Survey.
- Miss Sarah Jane Borland, lately District Nurse, Bath District, Wiltshire Area Health Authority.
- Jack Bowen, Higher Executive Officer, Ministry of Overseas Development.
- Miss Jessie McLeod Brannen, lately Principal Nursing Officer, Dundee District.
- Miss Betty Margaret Eva Breden, Senior Information Officer, Central Office of Information.
- William Brewer, Sector Administrator, Barnet/Finchley Health District.
- Ronald Norris Britton, Rubber Development Manager, Chloride Lorival Ltd.
- William Cecil Brodie, Inspector of Clerical Establishments, National Giro, Post Office.
- Miss Beryl Irene Brookman, lately Health Visitor, Islington.
- Archibald Campbell Brown, lately Professional and Technology Officer Grade 1, Property Services Agency, Department of the Environment.
- Gilbert Buchan, R.D. For services to the Herring Industry.
- Margaret Brenda, Mrs. Burns, Secretary, British Committee, European Schools Day.
- Edwin Butterton, Assistant Area Opencast Manager, National Coal Board.
- Nancy June, Mrs. Button, Nursing Officer, Rivermead Hospital, Oxfordshire Area Health Authority.
- George Thomas Caddey, Assistant Manager, Overseas Service, Navy, Army and Air Force Institutes.
- Cyril Dean Cain, Scientific Officer, National Physical Laboratory.
- Evan Roderick Gelling Cain. For services in the Isle of Man and particularly to the St. John Ambulance Brigade.
- Miss Phyllis Vera Cain, Higher Executive Officer, Department of Education and Science.
- Arthur Campbell, President, Scottish Cyclists' Union.
- George William Candelet, Divisional Organiser, Sheffield Division, Amalgamated Union of Engineering Workers.
- Peter Carpmel, Secretary, Blue Cross Animal Welfare Society.
- Doreen Mayhard, Mrs. Carr. For services to the community, and particularly the mentally handicapped in the Isle of Wight.
- Harold Cave. For services to the community in Nottingham.
- Richard Raymond Cawthorne, Managing Director, North Devon Meat Ltd.
- Rosemary Lavinia Cumberland, Mrs. Chapman, Senior Personal Secretary, National Institute for Research in Dairying.
- Frederick Robert Chipp, lately Senior Executive Officer, Ministry of Defence.
- Harold Percy Choate, Lately Chairman, Sedgemoor District Council.
- Roy Cloberry Christian, Lecturer, Derby College of Further Education.
- Sidney Alfred Christy, Establishment and Finance Officer, Commonwealth Institute.
- Rosina Emma, Mrs. Clark. For services to bee-keeping.
- Alfred Clarke, lately Chairman, North West Leicestershire District Council.
- Colin Comyn Clarke, Chief Office Clerk, House of Commons.
- Kathleen Miriam, Mrs. Clarke, Occupations Officer " A ", Rampton Hospital, Department of Health and Social Security.
- Edward Charles Clayden, lately Principal Technician, Bland Sutton Institute of Pathology.
- Thomas Cloonan, Higher Executive Officer, Cabinet Office.
- Joseph Clyne. For services to ex-Servicemen in Manchester and district.
- Doris Mabel, Mrs. Cole, Ward Sister, Darenth Park Hospital, Kent Area Health Authority.
- Miss Freda Knaggs College, Headteacher, Seaham Secondary School, Seaham, County Durham.
- Annie Elizabeth, Mrs. Collins. For services to the community, and particularly the elderly in Outwood, West Yorkshire.
- Gwladys Gwenfron, Mrs. Collis, Chairman, Wales Committee, Royal Commonwealth Society for the Blind.
- Miss Janet Conly, lately Foreign and Commonwealth Office.
- Brian Francis Conroy, Chief Maxillo-Facial Technician, Queen Mary's Hospital, Roehampton.
- Brian Rees Cook, Joint Managing Director, Setten and Durward Ltd., Llandrindod Wells.
- Robert Leslie Cook, Member, Erewash Borough Council, Derbyshire.
- Ronald Edward Cook, Assistant Head Postmaster, Hounslow, London Postal Region, Post Office.
- James Richard Cooper, Chief Research Officer, Unit on the Experimental Pathology of the Skin, Medical Research Council.
- George Basil Copley, Senior Nursing Officer, Tickhill Road Hospital, Doncaster.
- Anthony Cosker, Education Officer, H.M. Prison, Durham.
- Guilford Edward Crabtree, National Consultant, Scaffolding (Great Britain) Ltd.
- Miss Patricia Mary Cranston, Senior Nursing Officer, St. George's Hospital, London.
- Margaret, Mrs. Cromie. For services to the Royal British Legion Women's Section in Northern Ireland.
- Helen Murray, Mrs. Crummy, Organising Secretary, Craigmillar Festival Society.
- Beatrice Mary Ellen, Mrs. Dare, Supervisor, Reservations Department, Victoria Coach Station, National Travel (South East) Ltd.
- Allan John Darton, Chief Engineer, Midland Area, Sir Robert McAlpine and Sons Ltd.
- Miss Verna Naunton Davies, Superintendent Physiotherapist, Sully Hospital, South-Glamorgan Health Authority.
- Brian Michael Davis, Senior Officer, Board of Customs and Excise.
- Cyril Dawes, Senior Probation Officer, Cheshire Probation and After-Care Service.
- Alexander Sibbald Dawson, Higher Executive Officer, Department of Employment.
- Miss Audrey Agnes Lilian De Chastelain, lately Senior Executive Officer, Department of Prices and Consumer Protection.
- Charles William Dickins, Deputy Director (Mining), South Yorkshire Area, National Coal Board.
- Thomas Mill Donaldson, Senior Executive Officer, Board of Inland Revenue.
- Kenneth Stanley Chatfield Doy, Director, Boneham and Turner Ltd.
- Vincent Doyle, Assistant Competition Controller, Renold Ltd.
- Henry Richard Duggan. For services to the community, and particularly to the Hellingly Hospital League of Friends.
- Mary Violet Shurlock, Mrs. Duke, Headteacher, Princess Infant School, Moss Side, Manchester.
- Francis Edward Dunning, Chairman, King's Hall Community Association, Brent.
- David Early, Foreign and Commonwealth Office.
- Idwal Edwards, District Secretary, Gwynedd, Transport and General Workers' Union.
- James Egar, Treasurer, Northern Ireland Spina Bifida Association.
- Miss Beatrice Fanny Egerton, Personal Secretary, Greater London Council.
- Miss Daphne Sloan Elliott, Area Health Education Officer, Croydon Area Health Authority.
- Joyce Muriel, Mrs. Elliott. For services to youth in Oxshott.
- Frederick Ellis, lately Assistant Director of Social Services (Administration), Coventry City Council.
- John Barry English, Training Services Officer Grade 2, Department of Employment.
- Davy William Evans. For services to the community in Gwent.
- Kenneth Frederick John Evea, Senior Executive Officer, Department of Employment.
- Mabel, Mrs. Ewan, Member, Domestic Coal Consumers' Council.
- James Faulkner, Chief Superintendent, Royal Ulster Constabulary.
- Maurice Wylmer Field, Chairman, Stafford/Potteries Area, Supplementary Benefits Appeal Tribunal.
- Frederick James Fitzgerald, Divisional Highways Superintendent, North Yorkshire County Council.
- Miss Winefride Fletcher, Matron, Daliburgh Hospital, South Uist.
- Alfred Foots, Night Charge Nurse, Hull Royal Infirmary, Humberside Area Health Authority.
- Miss Annabelle Shirley Foster, Deputy Director, Nottinghamshire Branch, British Red Cross Society.
- Maurice Fox, County Staff Officer, Avon, St. John Ambulance Brigade.
- Harry Franz, Wool and Textile Correspondent, Yorkshire Post.
- John Fynn, Higher Executive Officer, Department of Health and Social Security.
- Marcel Pierre Gallin, Manager and Consultant, Brixham and Torbay Fish Ltd.
- Walter McGill Galloway, Observer Lieutenant, No. 25 Group, Prestwick, Royal Observer Corps.
- John Alfred Gamble, Traffic Technician, Warwickshire Sub-Unit, Midland Road Construction Unit.
- Mary Baird, Lady Gaye. For services to the community in Crediton.
- Miss Gertrude Frances Gerrard, lately Branch Secretary, Transport and General Workers' Union, British Insulated Callender's Cables Ltd., Cheshire.
- Miss Nellie Gibson, Welfare Secretary, Royal Patriotic Fund Corporation.
- Bernard Gilchrist, Secretary, The Scottish Wildlife Trust.
- Margaret Stewart, Mrs. Gilmour, Lecturer, Dumfries Technical College.
- Percy Glazer, Managing Director, Lewis & Peat (Rubber) Ltd. For services to Export.
- Miss Mona Edgecombe Going, Librarian, Kent Area Health Authority.
- Miss Hilda Grace Goldstone, lately District Head Occupational Therapist, Hastings Health District.
- Stuart Gordon, lately Manager, Propellant Department, Summerfield Research Station, Imperial Metal Industries.
- Robert William Gould, Inspector, Metropolitan Police.
- George Howson Green, Librarian, Canning House Centre.
- George Greene, Assistant Divisional Controller of Operations, Derwent Water Reclamation Division, Severn-Trent Water Authority.
- Leonard Charles Gregory, lately Manager, Experimental Manufacture, Rolls Royce (1971) Ltd.
- George Gribble, Secretary, East and West Midland Areas, Transport Users' Consultative Committees.
- Arfon Trevor Griffiths. For services to Association Football in Wales.
- Edith, Mrs. Griffiths. For services to the community in the Llandudno area.
- Miron Grindea, Editor, Adam International Review.
- Arthur George Hall, lately Chief Administrative Officer, Worcester Technical College.
- Miss Dorothy Barbara Halsall. For services to the welfare of old people.
- Catherine Cumming, Mrs. Hamilton, Chairman, Kilmarnock and Loudoun District Savings Committee.
- Graham Cameron Hamilton, General Manager, Aberdeen Savings Bank.
- James Henry Hannaford, Deputy Commandant, Fire Service Technical College.
- Reginald George Hansell, Senior Scientific Officer, Ministry of Defence.
- Eric Hudson Harker, Deputy Catering Manager, Trent Polytechnic.
- Cyril George Llewellyn Harries, Secretary, Derbyshire County Savings Committee.
- Albert Hartley, E.R.D., Senior Executive Officer, Metropolitan Police Office.
- Frederick Haswell, Chairman, Surrey County Savings Committee.
- Alan Lewis Hawkinds, Senior Executive Officer, Department of Employment.
- Sybille Edith, Mrs. Haynes. For services to Etruscan art.
- Austin Gerrard Healey, lately Deputy Principal, Writtle Agricultural College.
- Miss Dorothy Vera Heaven, Nursing Officer, West Somerset District, Somerset Area Health Authority.
- Charles Hedge, Senior Executive Officer, Civil Service Department.
- George Edward Donald Heffer, Assistant Chief Inspector, Chiswick Works, London Transport Executive.
- Elizabeth Florence, Mrs. Hill, B.E.M., London Regional Secretary, Women's Royal Voluntary Service.
- George Hill, Assistant Divisional Officer, London Ambulance Service.
- John Ernest Horne, President, Huddersfield Branch, British Limbless Ex-Servicemen's Association.
- Miss Nina Moti Hosali. For services to the welfare of animals particularly in North Africa.
- Edna May, Mrs. Hughes, Divisional Nursing Officer, North Sector, Hillingdon Area Health Authority.
- Alec Louvain Hurle, Higher Executive Officer, Board of Inland Revenue.
- David Alan Hutchison, Architect. Senior Partner, Hutchison, Locke and Monk.
- Donald Victor Hyett, Chief Trials Engineer, Naval Weapons Division, Hawker Siddeley Dynamics Ltd.
- Lawrence Frederick Insley, lately Chairman, Clay Pipe Development Association.
- Peter Jackson, Professional and Technology Officer II, Land Survey, Engineering Division, Harwell, United Kingdom Atomic Energy Authority.
- Isaac John Jacques, lately Member, Cannock Chase District Council.
- Andrew Duncan Jamieson, Inspector of Taxes, Board of Inland Revenue.
- Lawrence Bernard Jeffreys, Secretary to the Lord Mayor of Cardiff.
- Charles Delme Jenkins, Chairman and Managing Director, Consolidated Chemicals Ltd., Wrexham.
- Patrick Anthony Jennings. For services to Association Football.
- Philip Dunbar Johnson. For services to conservation and preservation in Old Hastings.
- Arnold Paterson Johnston, B.E.M., Senior Executive Officer, Department of Health and Social Security.
- Captain David Connell Johnston, lately 1st Class Pilot, Belfast Pilotage Authority.
- William Albert Booth Johnston, Chief Superintendent, Lothian and Borders Police.
- William Alan Johnstone. For services to ex-servicemen in Kendal.
- Lawrence Jones, Organising Secretary, Middlesex Association of Boys' Clubs.
- Mieczyslaw Marian Juny, Executive Officer, Department of Health and Social Security.
- Anne Elisabeth, Mrs. Keen, Education Officer, H.M. Prison, Maidstone.
- Miss Dorothy Lorna Kellett, lately Welfare Officer, British Broadcasting Corporation.
- Bertram Stephen Kemp, lately Safety and Security Manager, Dow Chemical Company, Barry.
- Leonard Key, Foreign and Commonwealth Office.
- Robert Arthur Knight, Radio Officer/Purser, m.v. " Phemius ", Ocean Fleets Ltd.
- Violet Monica, Mrs. Knill, Organiser, Citizens' Advice Bureau, Swansea.
- Robert Alexander Laker, Senior Architect, Greater London Council.
- Robert Frederick Lea, Ambulance Training Officer, Yorkshire Regional Health Authority.
- Joan Helen, Mrs. Le Baron Whyte, Reporter (Hansard), House of Lords.
- Miss Violet Mary Legge, Head Teacher, Benson Junior School, Hockley, Birmingham.
- Kenneth Bernard Leverton, Surveyor, Morden College, Blackheath.
- Joseph Levy, B.E.M. For services to the community, particularly to youth in London.
- Gordon Lewis, Chief Electrical Officer, R.R.S. John Biscoe, Natural Environment Research Council.
- Michael Lewis, Music Organiser, Rhyl Music Club.
- Leonard Francis Ley, Professional and Technology Officer II, Animal Virus Research Institute.
- Ronald Charles Lines. For services to the National Trust in the Midlands.
- Thomas Henry Lloyd, Senior Executive Officer, Department of Health and Social Security.
- John Fry Lobb. For services to music in Jersey.
- Howard Mcllwraith Lockhart. For services to drama and broadcasting in Scotland.
- Bernard John Loffler, Chairman, North-Western Regional Educational Savings Committee.
- Helen Elizabeth, Mrs. Lowne, Secretary, Workers' Educational Association, Worthing.
- Newton Loynes, County Secretary, Lincolnshire Branch, National Farmers' Union.
- John Henry Lear Mabbitt, District Administrator, Rhymney Valley Health District, Mid-Glamorgan Area Health Authority.
- Sheila Adair, Mrs. Macalister, Member, Borders Health Board.
- Robert West McBay, lately District Officer, H.M. Coastguard, Aberdeen, Department of Trade.
- Major Robert McCabe (Retd.), Retired Officer III, Ministry of Defence.
- James Norris McDonald, Manager, Leicester Branch, British Road Services Ltd., National Freight Corporation.
- John Urquhart McInnes, Area Tourist Officer, Fort William and Lochaber, Scottish Tourist Board.
- William McIntosh, Higher Executive Officer, Department of Health and Social Security.
- James McMillan, Founder, Association of Swimming Therapy.
- Rachel Mary, Mrs. McQueen. For services to the Scottish Women's Rural Institute.
- Charles Francis Magnago. For services to youth.
- Hermann Carl Marshall, Secretary, British Button Manufacturers' Association.
- John Martin, Pharmacist, Oban.
- Ronald Kenneth Martin, B.E.M., Chief Clerk, Eastern Wessex Territorial Auxiliary and Volunteer Reserve Association.
- Leslie Woodley Matcham, Headmaster, Queen's Park Lower School, Bedford.
- John Matthews, Clerical Officer, London Area Office, Sea Cadet Corps.
- William James Maule, Chief Inspector, Port of Bristol Authority Police.
- William Edward Joseph Mawditt, Assistant Divisional Officer, Hampshire Fire Brigade.
- Willam James Maxwell, Youth Leader, Belfast Newsboys Club.
- George Francis Meddick, Works Director, Sheltered Workshop, Cheadle Royal (Industries) Ltd.
- Arthur Charles Moore, Chief Estimator, Marconi Space Defence Systems. For services to Export.
- Raymond Moore, Station Officer, Fire Authority for Northern Ireland.
- Francis Desmond Hickson Moriarty, Managing Director, Glenveigh Textiles, Londonderry.
- William Morris, Chairman, Meirionnydd Savings Committee.
- William David Morrow. For services to agricultural journalism in Northern Ireland.
- Ronald William Morton, Principal Scientist, Technical Division, Esso Research Centre, Abingdon.
- Princess Helena Moutafian. For social services in London.
- Charles William Munday, Senior Executive Officer, Department of Energy.
- Patrick Joseph Nagle, Senior Officer, Board of Customs and Excise.
- Victor Natt, Assistant Executive Engineer, South Central Area, London Telecommunications Region, Post Office.
- William Kenneth Nattrass, Controller of Trading Standards, Cheshire.
- Joseph Naylor. For services to Fell Running.
- Miss Winifred Alice Newcombe. For services to the Girls' Brigade in Cirencester.
- Marjorie, Mrs. Newman. Personal Secretary, Welsh Office.
- Vincent Paul Nihill, Race Walker.
- Ian Arthur Nixon, lately Higher Scientific Officer, Meteorological Office.
- William Northwood, Editor, Television News Review for the Deaf, British Broadcasting Corporation.
- Miss Edith Maud Oates, Personal Secretary, Department of Health and Social Security.
- Harold Ormiston, lately Chief Civil Engineer, Eastern Region, York, British Railways Board.
- Allan Herbert Osment, Senior Administrative Officer, Cwmbran Development Corporation.
- Joseph Peter Palastanga, Deputy Chief Constable, Gwent Constabulary.
- Stephen Walter Lefroy Pardoe, Regional Opencast Director, Northern Region, Opencast Executive, National Coal Board.
- William Michael John Palfrey, Quality Manager, Cossor Electronics Ltd.
- Cora, Mrs. Parry, Local Organiser, Wailasey, Women's Royal Voluntary Service.
- Henry Hugh Pascoe, Higher Clerical Assistant, South Western Electricity Board.
- James Paterson, Councillor, Falkirk District Council.
- Wilfred Henry David Paterson, lately Captain, m.v. " Royal Iris ", Merseyside Passenger Transport Executive.
- John Godfrey Patterson, Senior Executive Officer, Department of Employment.
- Mary Wright, Mrs. Peacock, Teacher, Cumbrae Secondary School, Millport.
- Mary, Mrs. Pearson, Headmistress, Corporation Road Nursery School, Darlington.
- Joseph Leonard Peart, lately Hospital Engineer, St. Mary's Hospital, Leeds.
- Kathleen Joan, Mrs. Peasant, Head Teacher, Featherstone Church of England junior and Infants School, Wakefield.
- Miss Lena May Peat, lately Sister in charge, Outpatients' Nursing Service, Croydon Area Health Authority.
- Leslie Peirson, Manager, Industrial Relations, Scun- thorpe and Lancashire Group, General Steels Division, British Steel Corporation.
- Arthur John Percival. For services to conservation.
- Roy Phillips, Group Controller, Durham Group, United Kingdom Warning and Monitoring Organisation.
- George Ambrose Pickett. For services to the community in Canvey Island.
- James Edward Plant, Senior Executive Officer, Home Office.
- Arthur Pierre Porri, Deputy County Planning Officer, Berkshire County Council.
- Alfred Joseph Potter, Administration Manager, British Transport Films, British Railways Board.
- Miss Frances Lily Potts, lately Divisional Nursing Officer, East Dorset Health Care District.
- Laurie Alfred Pritchard, Reserve Warden, South West Region, Nature Conservancy Council.
- Walter Purdam, Headmaster, Valley Junior School, Whitehaven, Cumbria.
- Thomas Albert Quarrinton, Assistant Commercial Director (Tariffs and Economics), London Electricity Board.
- Miss Margaret Muriel Radforth, Personal Secretary, Liverpool City Council.
- Geoffrey William Reigate. For services to the education of the deaf in the developing countries.
- Edward Reed, Area Engineer, Northern General Transport Company Ltd.
- Betty Margery Maud, Mrs. Reid, Secretary, Suffolk Association of Local Councils.
- Charles Malcolm Revis, Community Relations Officer, Gravesend and District.
- Miss Joyce Queenie Batson Rhodes, Senior Executive Officer, Public Trustee Office.
- Ruby Gertrude, Mrs. Rhydderch, Member, City of Birmingham Council.
- Richard George Riddiford, Sales Manager, Aerospace Division, Airscrew Howden Ltd.
- James Harley Rigby, T.D., lately Principal Administrative Officer, Cheshire County Council.
- Mary Joy, Mrs. Roberts, Sister, Royal Manchester Children's Hospital, Pendlebury, Salford Area Health Authority.
- Barbara Elizabeth, Mrs. Robertson, Chairman, Bath Festival Society.
- George Taylor Robertson, General Medical Practitioner, Dingwall and Invergordon.
- Albert Ronald Rourke, Captain, Church Army, Huyton, Liverpool.
- Miss Miriam Irene Sankey, Professional Adviser, (District Nursing), Department of Health and Social Security.
- William Scobbie, Principal Educational Resource Librarian, Lanark Division, Strathclyde Region.
- Mervyn James Semple, Head, Chemistry Department, Belfast Royal Academy.
- Leonard Sidney Shaw, Executive Officer, Privy Council Office.
- Richard Charles Shears, Senior Executive Officer, Crown Agents for Oversea Governments and Administrations.
- James Philip Sheen, Higher Executive Officer, Ministry of Defence.
- Miss Helena Rose Shelah. For services to the Scout Association in Berkshire.
- William Martin Sheldon, Production Superintendent, Smart and Brown Engineers Ltd., Spennymoor.
- Charles Forster Short, Leader, Easington District Council.
- Frederick Edward Shrosbree, Member, Building Economic Development Council.
- John Simmonds, Chairman, Cornwall County Savings Committee.
- Henry Skyte, Secretary, Leeds Jewish Welfare Board.
- Evelyn Mary Edith, Mrs. Slade, Member, Southern Gas Consumers' Council.
- Miss Anna Isobel Sloan, lately Senior Superintendent of Typists, Department of Commerce, Northern Ireland.
- Albert Robert Slorach, Headmaster, Kinloss Primary School.
- Frank Osbaldeston Morgan Smith. For services to the Tavistock Repertory Company.
- George Andrew Smith, Director of Housing, City of Dundee District Council.
- Norman Lewis Smith. For services to sport in Birmingham and district.
- Dorothy, Mrs. Smout, Secretary, League of Friends, Rubery Hill Hospital, Birmingham.
- Basil Spark, Personal Assistant, Vickers Ltd., Newcastle upon Tyne.
- Bernard Montague Spicer, Chief Associate, Crown Office and Associates Department, Royal Courts of Justice.
- Oliver Tom Springer, Chairman, Oliver Tom's Catering Equipment Ltd.
- Walter Henry Stapleton, Q.P.M., Assistant Commissioner, City of London Police.
- William Gerard Stappard, Senior Executive Officer, Department of Health and Social Security.
- Robert Reid Stevely, Manager, Propellants Research, Nobel's Explosives Company Ltd.
- Andrew (Andy) Stewart, Entertainer.
- Miss Lilian Doreen Stubbington, Senior Executive Officer, Board of Inland Revenue.
- Walter Sturman, lately Professional and Technology Officer I, Ministry of Defence.
- Frederick Leslie Swain, Service Manager, Westland Helicopters Ltd. For services to Export.
- Robert Sydney Swan, Q.P.M., Superintendent, Royal Ulster Constabulary.
- Miss June Marion Swann, Keeper, Boot and Shoe Collection, Northampton Museum.
- Edward Selwyn Tarleton, Leader, Armagh Boys Club.
- Miss Catherine Helen Thane, lately Teacher, John Scurr Junior School, London.
- Mary Elizabeth, Mrs. Thomas. For services to the community in Bromley, Kent.
- Helen Mary, Mrs. Tomkinson. For services to Ski-ing.
- Miss Harriet Elizabeth Tomlinson, Senior Execu- tive Officer, Department for National Savings.
- John Tonge, Studio General Manager, Tyne Tees Television Ltd.
- Charles Harry Townsend, Assistant Director (Engineering Planning), British Gas Corporation.
- William Desmond Treen, Chairman, No. 1310 (Eryri) Squadron, Air Training Corps.
- Harold Joseph Tuffen, lately Head of Mechanical Systems Design Department, Hawker Siddeley Aviation Ltd.
- Miss Meriel Patricia Tufnell, Jockey.
- Miss Joan Mary Anita Turner, Head Teacher, Eldon Infants' School, Enfield.
- John Norman Vass. For services to the community in Cumbernauld.
- Miss Patricia Joyce Vaughan, Senior Executive Officer, Department of the Environment.
- Miss Doris Vickers, Nursing Officer, West Cumbria District, Cumbria Area Health Authority.
- Harry Richard Walton. For services to the elderly in Berkshire.
- Thomas Weir, Freelance Journalist, Scotland.
- Douglas Arthur West, Managing Director, General Print Division, Bemrose and Sons Ltd.
- Victor Whiteman, Deputy Chairman, Staffordshire County Savings Committee.
- Thomas Whittlestone, Chief Superintendent, Merseyside Police.
- Marjorie Elizabeth, Mrs. Whyte, Leeds Metropolitan District Organiser, Women's Royal Voluntary Service.
- Harold Edward Widden, Higher Executive Officer, Department of Health and Social Security.
- Frederick Widdowson, Production Director, Vacu-Lug Traction Tyres Ltd.
- Harvey Wild, lately Director, Shiloh Spinners Ltd.
- Miss Doris Elsie Wilkins, Women's Royal Voluntary Service Representative, 10th Princess Mary's Own Gurkha Rifles.
- Miss Eileen Alice Williams, lately Clerical Officer, Ministry of Defence.
- Miss Elizabeth Emily Williams, Audio Typist, Ministry of Agriculture, Fisheries and Food.
- James William Williamson. For services to Swimming in Scotland.
- Stephen Randolph Wills, Executive Secretary, British Overseas Trade Group for Israel. For services to Export.
- Hilda Mary, Mrs. Wingfield, Regional Co-ordinator of Welfare Services, West Midland Region, Women's Royal Voluntary Service.
- George Francis Witchell, Overseas Travelling Commissioner, The Scout Association.
- Ronald Leslie Woods, Senior Officer, Board of Customs and Excise.
- Bryan Owen Woolnough, Chief Inspector, Metropolitan Police.
- Miss Cynthia Mary York, Higher Executive Officer, Ministry of Defence.
- Miss Joan Young, Executive Officer I, Northern Ireland Office.
- Miss Judith Ann Seymour Young, Personal Assistant to The Right Honourable Jeremy Thorpe, M.P.

== Australia ==
=== Knight or Dame Commander of the British Empire ===
- Nigel Hubert Bowen. In recognition of services to political services.
- Monica Josephine Gallagher. In recognition of service to the community.
- Francis George Hassett. Chief of the Defence Force Staff.
- James Adam Louis Matheson. Services to education and to Victoria.
- Ada May Norris. Distinguished community service.
- James Robert Price. Services to science and government.
- Charles Frederick Read. Chief of the Air Staff.
- Hector Hamilton Stewart. Services to medicine and the community.

=== Commander of the Order of the British Empire ===
- Harold George Aston, of Pymble New South Wales. For service to industry.
- Lloyd Forrester Bott, D.S.C., of Hughes, Australian Capital Territory. For public service.
- Cyril Checci, M.B.E., of Willaura Victoria. For service to medicine.
- Edward John Connellan, O.B.E., of Alice Springs, Northern Territory. For service to aviation.
- Peter David Connolly, Q.C., of Hamilton, Queensland. For service to law.
- Harry Medcalf Fisher, O.B.E., E.D., of Launceston, Tasmania. For service to medicine.
- Walter Ives, of Pearce, Australian Territory. For public service.
- Friedrich Max Lohe, of North Adelaide, South Australia. For service to religion.
- The Honouarble John Edward Marriott, of Sandy Bay, Tasmania. For service to politics.
- Norman James Parkes, O.B.E., of Red Hill, Australian Capital Territory. For public service.
- William Thomas Robertson, O.B.E., M.C., of South Yarra, Victoria. For public service.
- Alfred Francis Job Smith, of Seaforth, New South Wales. For service to the export industry.
- Malcolm Macgregor Summers, of Reid, Australian Capital Territory. For public service.
- Thomas Baikie Swanson, of South Yarra Victoria. For serviceto education.
- Harold White, of Vaucluse, New South Wales. For public service.

=== Officer of the Order of the British Empire ===
- David John Ayling, of Hazelwood Park, South Australia. For public service.
- Alderman Walter Lewis Bridgland, of Glenelg, South Australia. For community service.
- William John Bridgman, of Forrest, Australian Capital Territory. For public service.
- Phillip Henry Budden, of Killara, New South Wales. For service to the film industry.
- Henry George Collins, of Macquarie, Australian Capital Territory. For public service.
- Commissioner Jack Mervyn Davis, C.V.O., Q.P.M., of Farrer, Australian Capital Territory. For public service.
- John Edward Menzies Dixon, of Turramurra, New South Wales. For services to industry and education.
- Eric William Dwyer, of Red Hill, Australian Capital Territory. For public service.
- Donald Payze Eckersley, of Yarloop, Western Australia. For service to primary industry.
- John Henry Webb Fingleton, of Forrest, Australian Capital Territory. For services to sport and journalism.
- James Ewen Kirkwood Galbraith, of Malvern, Victoria. For services to medicine and international relations.
- Eileen Clara, Mrs. Hardy, of Seacliff, South Australia. For service to primary industry.
- The Reverend Peter John Hollingworth, of Fitzroy, Victoria. For community service.
- Keith Valentine Leighton Kesteven, of Ainslie, Australian Capital Territory. For service to primary industry.
- Patrick Joseph Lanigan, of Red Hill, Australian Capital Territory. For public services.
- Joyce Marion, Mrs. McConnell, of Deakin, Australian Capital Territory. For community service.
- Finlay McNab, of Moonee Ponds, Victoria. For service to sport.
- Thomas John Quilty, of Hills Creek, Western Australia. For service to primary industry.
- Richard Robert Richey, of Devonport, Tasmania. For community service.
- James Samuel Samson, of Esperance, Western Australia. For services to politics and primary industry.
- The Reverend Keith Douglas Seaman, of Glenalta, South Australia. For community service.
- Ewart Smith, of Campbell, Australian Capital Territory. For public service.
- Neil Warran-Smith, of Knoxfield, Victoria. For service to opera.
- Professor (Miss) Betty Hazel Watts, of Corinda, Queensland. For service to education.
- Donald Eric Weiss, of Blackburn, Victoria. For public service.
- Frederick Ronald Williams, of Hawthorn, Victoria. For service to the arts.

=== Knights Bachelor ===
- Bede Bertrand Callaghan, C.B.E., of Gordon, New South Wales. For distinguished service to banking.
- Phillip Halford Cook, O.B.E., of Geneva, Switzerland. For distinguished service to International Labour Organisations.
- Alan Sydenham Cooley, C.B.E., of Campbell, Australian Capital Territory. For distinguished public service.
- John Alfred Roy Egerton, of Albion, Queensland. For distinguished service to government and to trade unionism.
- Patrick John Kenny, of Mosman, New South Wales. For distinguished service to medicine.
- The Honourable John Patrick Minogue, of Seymour, Victoria. For distinguished service to law.
- The Honourable Mr. Justice John Cochrane Moore, of North Ryde, New South Wales. For distinguished service to law.
- Rex de Charembac Nan Kivell, C.M.G., of London, England. For distinguished service to the arts.
- Dennis Craig Paterson, of Kensington Gardens, South Australia. For distinguished service to medicine.
- Robert John Southey, C.M.G., of Mount Eliza, Victoria. For distinguished service to politics and to the community.
- Frederick Munro Wiltshire, C.B.E., of South Yarra, Victoria. For distinguished service to industry and to government.
