= SS Maori =

SS Maori is the name of the following ships:

- SS Maori (1868), sank while moored in 1913
- SS Maori (1893), wrecked in 1909

== See also ==
- Maori (disambiguation)
