= SS Maori (1868) =

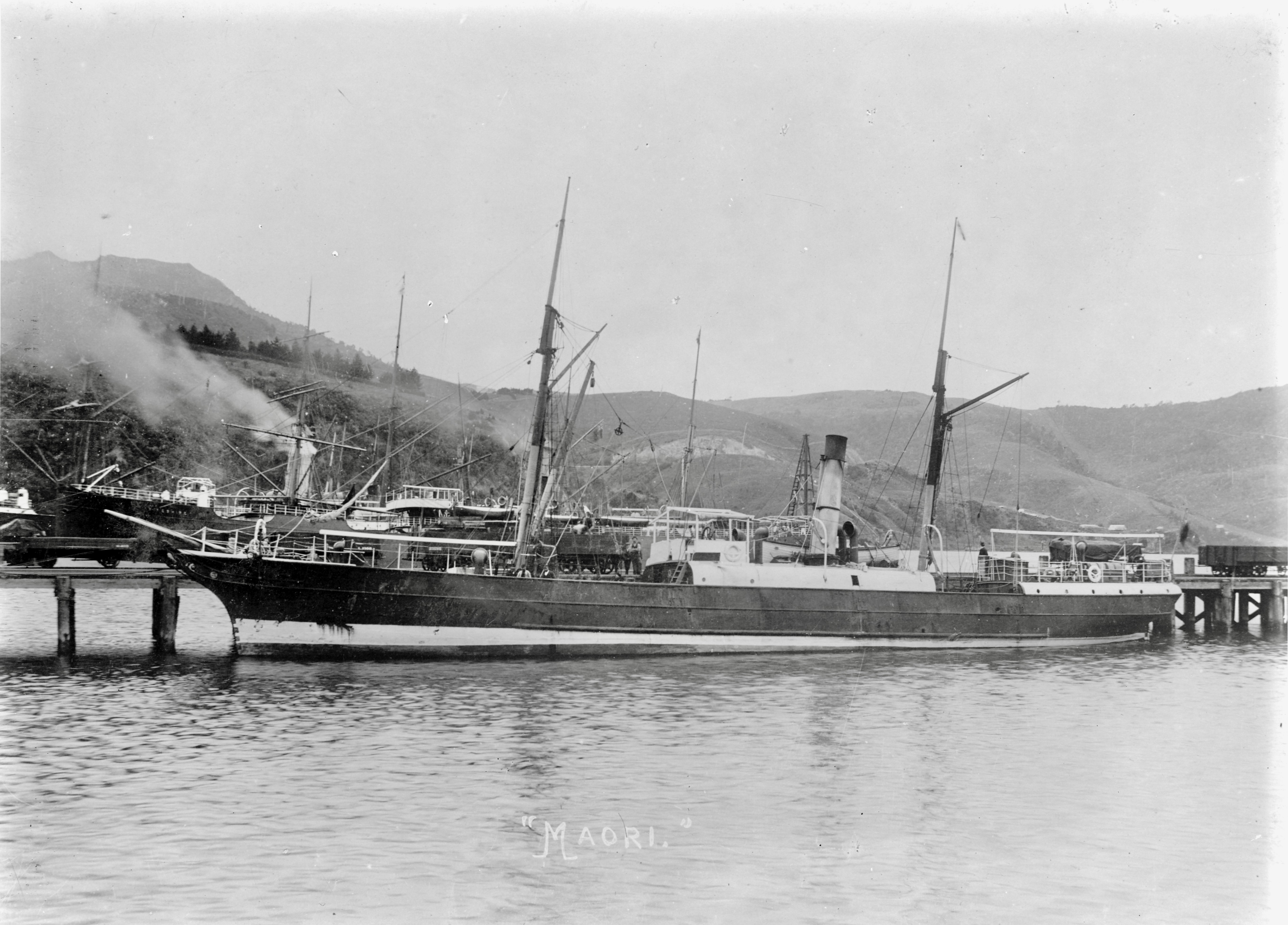

History
- Name: SS Maori
- Owner: 1869 Turnbull, Smith & Co; 1869 Harbour Steam Co; 1875 Union Steamship Co, Dunedin; 1884 Brunner Coal Co, Greymouth; 1888 Union Steamship; 1902 Captain Allen for use in Samoa; 1907 Samoa Shipping & Trading Co Ltd
- Builder: Blackwood & Gordon, Port Glasgow
- Launched: 6 August 1868
- Identification: IMO number: 62401
- Fate: Sank at her moorings, 1913

General characteristics
- Tonnage: 174 GRT
- Length: 144 ft (44 m)
- Beam: 19.1 ft (5.8 m)
- Depth: 9.2 ft (2.8 m)
- Speed: 10.5 knots (19.4 km/h; 12.1 mph)

SS Maori was a Union Company, schooner-rigged steamer, able to carry 20 saloon passengers, 12 steerage and 211 tons of cargo, with a 60 hp (45 kW), 2-cylinder (27, 20 in.) compound engine, driving a screw. On 15 January 1869 she arrived under sail at Lyttelton for Turnbull, Smith & Co. Later in the year she was bought by the Harbour Steam Company to run between Lyttelton and Dunedin.

She was among the first ships in the Union Steamship fleet when Harbour Steam Co merged into that company. In March 1884 she was sold to Martin Kennedy. His Brunner Coal Co used her as a collier from Greymouth, until August 1888, when Brunner merged with Union and she rejoined the fleet.

In November 1902 she had been laid up at Port Chalmers for 18 months when sold to Captain E. F. Allen, for use in Samoa, though her registration passed to George Dunnett, Auckland and by 1904 to Henderson & Macfarlane, Auckland. A 1905 report confirmed she already belonged to Captain Allen, but it wasn't until 1907 that she officially transferred to his Samoa Shipping & Trading Co Ltd, Auckland, when Captain Orkney had 16 shares, with 48 held by shipbuilders. In 1908 Samoa Shipping decided to replace her with a larger ship. In 1913 she seems to have been ordered out of Apia harbour, due to her dilapidated state, and was either run onto a nearby reef, which may have been in Saluafata Harbour, near Falefa and Eva, or an alternative source says she sank at her moorings there and US aircraft bombed her in 1942, thinking she was a Japanese submarine.

== Other ships named Maori ==
- She was the first in the Union fleet with the name Maori. Later ships with the name were in the fleet 1907–1946 and 1953–1972.
- In 1852 Maori was one of 11 New Zealand Line sailing ships linking with London sailing between 1851 and 1870. She was registered as 799 tons and had a tattooed figurehead.
- In the 1850s a 321 ton barque sailed between Nelson and Sydney.
- A 17 ton steamer was built by Northe & M'Auley in Napier in 1880. She served Waikere, Mohaka, Wairoa and Marumaru. She steamed to Auckland in 1884 and served Mangawhai and Wairoa and, from 1891, Matakana and Wade for the Hauraki Steamship Co, until replaced by Orewa in 1898. In 1902 she ran between Onehunga and Waiuku.
- The name was also used by a 5,200 ton Shaw, Savill & Albion Co ship 1893–1909.
- HMS Maori (1909) was sunk in 1915.
- HMS Maori (F24) was built in 1938 and sunk in 1942.
- A steamer on the Murray River was mentioned in 1907 and, in 1926, a small steamer used to carry timber was burnt to the waterline at Euston.
- A 6,883 ton bulk carrier was built by Gisan Shipyard, Tuzla, in 2021 for Vestra Marine Doo, Novi Sad, and registered at Valletta.
