= Philip Watson =

Phil or Philip Watson may refer to:

- Philip Watson (footballer) (1881–1953), Scottish footballer
- Phil Watson (footballer) (1907–1990), Scottish professional footballer and son of the above
- Phil Watson (1914—1991), Canadian professional ice hockey player and coach in the National Hockey League
- Philip Watson (Royal Navy officer) (1919–2009), senior Royal Navy officer, rising to the rank of vice-admiral
