= Meriel =

Meriel may refer to:

- Mériel, a commune in the French department of Val-d'Oise

== People with the given name ==
- Meriel Barham, musician
- Meriel Forbes (1913–2000), English actress
- Meriel Horson, British actress who play one of the women in the wood in The Dalek Invasion of Earth
- Meriel Jones, actress who played Gwen in Noson Lawen
- Meriel Lucas (fl. 1910s), English badminton player
- Meriel Talbot (1866–1956), British public servant and women's welfare worker
- Meriel Patricia Tufnell (1948–2002), jockey
- Meriel Anne Watts, candidate in the 2002 New Zealand general election
- Meriel Wingfield, wife of Arthur Chichester, 4th Baron Templemore

=== Fictional ===
- Meriel Sawle, a character in the Adam Loveday series of books by Kate Tremayne
- Meriel Vaughn, a character on Hollyoaks
- Meriel, the daughter of Kenton Archer on The Archers

== People with the surname ==
- Gilbert Meriel (born 1986), soccer player from Tahiti

== See also ==
- Lady Jane Meriel Grosvenor, the daughter of Robert Grosvenor, 5th Duke of Westminster
