= Hywel Evans =

Hywel Evans may refer to:

- Hywel Evans (figure skater)
- Hywel Evans (civil servant)
- Hywel David Evans, Australian politician
