= Horace William Heyman =

British pioneer of electric vehicle industry

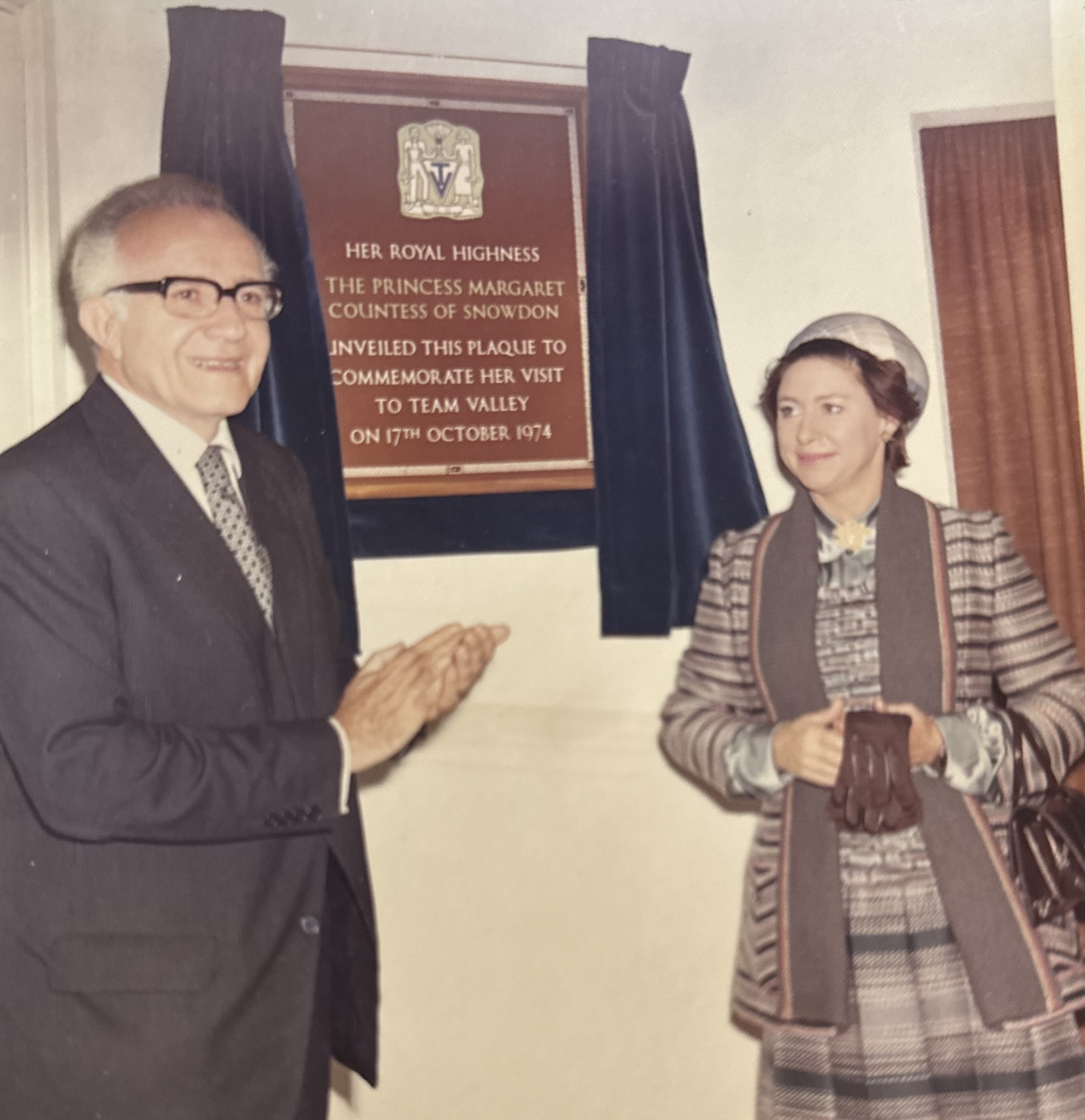
Horace Heyman with Princess Margaret on her visit to Team Valley in 1974

Sir Horace William Heyman, B.Sc., F.I.E.E., C.Eng. (March 13, 1912 – September 4, 1998) was a pioneer in the development of electric vehicles in the United Kingdom, and prominent in the economic development of the North East of England after World War II. After a successful career as Managing Director of Smith's Electric Vehicles (subsequently renamed Smith Electric Vehicles) he was Chairman of the English Industrial Estates Corporation, President of the Northumbria Tourist Board and Vice Chairman of the Newcastle Polytechnic. He was made a Knight Bachelor in 1976.

== Early life and education ==
Heyman was born Horst Wilhelm Heymann in Berlin, the son of Recha Heymann (née de Taube 1887–1978) and Max Heymann (1874–1918). He was educated in Berlin, with a year abroad (1928–29) at Ackworth School, a Quaker school, in Pontefract, York. After leaving school, he began studying Electrical Engineering at the Darmstadt Technische Hochschule.

When the Nazi party came to power in Germany in 1933, Heyman decided to go to England in 1933 with his girlfriend Edith Marcuse, to continue his Electrical Engineering studies at the University of Birmingham, a city where his stepfather lived. The distinguished physicist and electrical engineer Dr. Robert Pohl, D. Eng., D. Sc., F.I.E.E. (1878-1956), had many contacts, having worked in England from 1904 to 1919. He changed his name from Horst Wilhelm Heymann to Horace William Heyman, and graduated with a Bachelor of Science degree in 1936.

== Career ==
After graduation, from 1936 to 1940 Heyman worked for Morrison-Electricar in Birmingham as assistant chief electrical engineer for electric vehicles. In 1940, he moved to Metropolitan Vickers in Sheffield to work on the development of electric industrial trucks and vehicles until the board abandoned the project, and in 1944, Metropolitan Vickers sold its electric vehicle business to the Brush Electrical Engineering Company Limited based in Loughborough. Heyman worked there until the end of 1945, when he secured the job of managing a small electric vehicle division of Northern Coachbuilders, based in Newcastle and owned by the Smith family, whose primary business was tea merchanting as Ringtons Limited.

By 1949, the new division had become important enough to become a separate company Smith's Electric Vehicles Limited, and move to a new factory on the Team Valley Trading Estate in the town of Gateshead, on the southern bank of the river Tyne. Heyman was formally appointed Managing Director. By the end of the 1950s, the company had expanded to produce non-electric vehicles as well for a wide range of industries, including mobile shops and refrigerated trucks. In 1958, Heyman diversified the company to the manufacture of ice-cream trucks, by introducing soft ice-cream to the United Kingdom through a joint venture with Mister Softee, the US company owned by the Conway family, in conjunction with J. Lyons and Co.

While he was an active Managing Director, Heyman did not forget his electrical engineering background, and was continuously attempting to increase the efficiency of the electric vehicles. A major breakthrough was the development of a new control device for electric motors, called Sevcon. The device warranted the formation by Heyman of a separate company, with another company on the Team Valley Trading Estate, Joyce Loebl Ltd., called Sevcon Engineering Limited in 1960. The patent was applied for in 1960 and granted in 1964. Sevcon was subsequently listed on the US stock exchange in 1988, and purchased by BorgWarner in 2017.

During the 1950s, Smith's position in the electric vehicle industry was recognized through the appointment of Heyman as a member of the Council of the Society of Motor Manufacturers and Traders (SMMT) from 1949 to 1964, and Heyman was Chairman of the Electric Vehicle Association of Great Britain from 1953 to 1955, after serving as an executive member for many years.

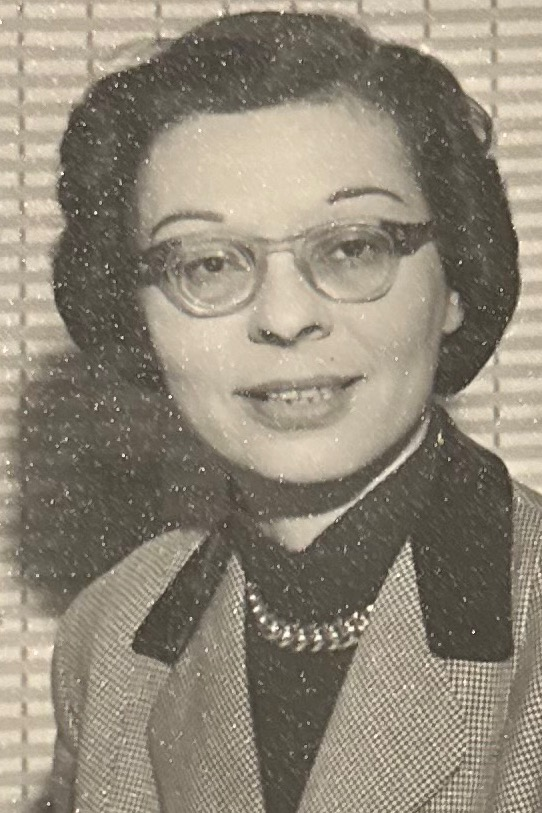
Edith Heyman

In 1950, Heyman was joined by his wife Edith as Sales Director and she played an important role in accelerating the company's growth, especially as Heyman began devoting more time to exporting the company's products to Continental Europe and the Americas. Edith's role in the company was recognized when she was made a Member of the British Empire (MBE) in 1962. She left the company that year, and Heyman left it in 1964.

Throughout his professional career, during the 28 years since he had graduated from Birmingham University, Heyman had fulfilled an important role in the consolidation of the position of the United Kingdom since WWI as a global leader in the production and utilization of electric vehicles, estimated to have reached the level of 45,000 vehicles in 1968 The global position of the UK and Heyman's technical knowledge and commercial experience of electric vehicles were so widely recognized that, in 1967, he was invited to travel to the United States from England to testify as an expert witness on the future of battery electric vehicles before a Committee of the United States Senate, which had been set up to consider ways of reducing air and water pollution. His advice to the Committee was that battery technology, while widely used in the UK, had not been developed sufficiently to reduce dependence on fossil fuels, but was likely to occur in the future.

After 1964, Heyman began moving from the private to the public sector, becoming Export Marketing Advisor for the Northern Region to the Board of Trade from 1969 to 1970. In 1970, he was appointed Chairman of the English Industrial Estates Corporation (EIEC), whose headquarters were on the Team Valley Trading Estate.

Following his retirement in 1977 from the EIEC, Heyman continued to be active in the economic development of the North East, as President of the Northumbria Tourism Board (1983–86), and as Vice Chairman of the Newcastle Polytechnic, subsequently Northumbria University (1983–86).

== Personal life ==
Heyman married Edith Marcuse (1913-1989), who had left Berlin with him in 1933, in 1939. They had two children: Constance Helen (1943-2009) and Timothy (1946-). Timothy Heyman was made Commander of the British Empire (CBE) in 2013. Their marriage was dissolved in 1966, and in the same year Heyman married Dorothy Atkinson, who became Lady Dorothy Heyman in 1976.

== Honours ==
For his services to the electrical vehicle industry, Heyman was made a Fellow of the Institute of Electrical Engineers (F.I.E.E.) and Chartered Engineer (C.Eng.). For his services to economic development as Chairman of the English Industrial Estates Corporation, Heyman was made Knight Bachelor in 1976.
