= Juanita Rule =

British nurse, educator and trade unionist

Juanita Rule OBE FRCN
- Born: 1914; Broadstairs
- Died: 2008 (aged 93–94); Warminster
- Occupation: nurse
- Employer: Royal College of Nursing

Juanita Bennett Rule, OBE, FRCN (20 November 1914 – 23 March 2008) was a British nurse, educator and trade unionist. She was director of the Royal College of Nursing's Institute of Advance Nursing Education from 1971 until her retirement in 1976, and was deputy president of the Royal College of Nursing from 1976 to 1978. Rule was appointed Officer of the Order of the British Empire (OBE) in recognition of her work with the Institute of Advance Nursing Education. She was also part of the first cohort of nurses to be made Fellow of the Royal College of Nursing (FRCN), "in recognition of her exceptional commitment to nursing practice through the better education of nurses at all levels".

== Life ==
Juanita Bennett Rule was born on 20 November 1914 in Broadstairs, Kent. Her father was a medical doctor, but before her birth was managing family-owned tin mines in Mexico. She was educated at St Margaret's School, Burnham-on-Sea. Rule intended to study medicine at the University of Edinburgh like her father, but as her school did not teach science, she ended up training as a nurse instead. She was however one of the first nurses to take a degree, gaining honours at Edinburgh. Having trained as a nurse in the 1930s, she moved into nurse education following the Second World War. She rose to become director of the Royal College of Nursing's Institute of Advance Nursing Education from 1971 until her retirement in 1976, and was the elected deputy president of the Royal College of Nursing from 1976 to 1978.

In the 1976 Queen's Birthday Honours, Rule was appointed Officer of the Order of the British Empire (OBE) in recognition of her work with the Institute of Advance Nursing Education. Also in 1976, she was part of the first cohort of nurses to be made appointed Fellow of the Royal College of Nursing (FRCN), "in recognition of her exceptional commitment to nursing practice through the better education of nurses at all levels".

She died on 23 March 2008 in Warminster, Wiltshire.
