= Julieta (apple) =

Apple cultivar

Julieta apple is an apple variety developed by growers at the Agronomic Institute of Paraná (IAPAR) in the Brazilian state of Paraná. Like the Eva, the Julieta is for subtropical climes in many parts of Brazil.
