= Peter le Cheminant =

British civil servant (1926–2006)

Peter le Cheminant, CB (29 April 1926 – 25 July 2006) was a British civil servant.

A graduate of the London School of Economics, le Cheminant was an officer in the Royal Naval Volunteer Reserve before entering the Civil Service in the Ministry of Power in 1949. He was a private secretary to the Prime Minister from 1965 to 1968, deputy secretary in the Department of Energy (1974–77), Cabinet Office (1978–81) and HM Treasury (1981–83), and then Second Permanent Secretary at the Cabinet Office with responsibility for the Management and Personnel Office from 1983 to 1984. While le Cheminant held the latter office, the Head of the Home Civil Service, Sir Robert Armstrong, delegated the day-to-day running of the service to him. After retiring from the civil service, le Cheminant was, finally, Director-General of the General Council of British Shipping from 1985 to 1991.

Le Cheminant was appointed a Companion of the Order of the Bath (CB) in the 1976 Birthday Honours and published his memoirs in Beautiful Ambiguities: An Inside View of the Heart of Government (London: The Radcliffe Press, 2001).
