= John Moore (Australian judge) =

Australian jurist

Sir John Cochrane Moore AC (5 November 1915 – 30 August 1998) was an Australian jurist. In 1973 he became the presiding judge of the Australian Conciliation and Arbitration Commission. Under the Australian system, this commission served as both an arbitrator in labour disputes and as a court for the enforcement of certain provisions of the Commonwealth's labour laws.

He was knighted in 1976 for "distinguished service to law", and appointed a Companion of the Order of Australia in 1986.

== See also ==
- Judiciary of Australia

== Sources ==
- Prentis, Malcolm. "Great Australian Presbyterians: The Game". Uniting Church in Australia. Archived from the original on 11 December 2006.
