= HMNZS Maori =

HMNZS Maori is the name of the following ships of the Royal New Zealand Navy:

- HMNZS Maori (P3570), a Fairmile B motor launch
- HMNZS Maori, later renamed HMNZS Mako

== See also ==
- Maori (disambiguation)
