= Māori =

Māori or Maori may refer to:

== Relating to Māori people ==
- Māori people of New Zealand
- Māori language of New Zealand
- Māori culture of New Zealand
- Cook Islanders, the Māori people of the Cook Islands
- Cook Islands Māori, the language of the Cook Islanders

== Ships ==
- SS Maori (1893), a steamship of the Shaw Savill Line, wrecked 1909
- HMS Maori (1909), a Royal Navy Tribal-class destroyer, sunk in 1915
- HMS Maori (F24), a Royal Navy Tribal-class destroyer, launched 1936 and sunk 1942
- HMNZS Maori, ships of the Royal New Zealand Navy
- TEV Maori III, a Union Steam Ship Company inter-island ferry, 1952–1974

== Sports teams ==
- New Zealand Māori cricket team
- New Zealand Māori rugby league team
- New Zealand Māori rugby union team

== Other ==
- Maori, a 1988 novel by Alan Dean Foster
- Mayotte, Maori in the Bushi language
- Mount Maori, a mountain in New Zealand
- Māori Television Service, a New Zealand organisation
- Whakaata Māori, a New Zealand television channel

== See also ==
- Maohi, people of French Polynesia
- Native Hawaiians (Kānaka Maoli)
