= Eva (Norwegian magazine) =

Norwegian women's magazine

Eva was a Norwegian monthly magazine, released by Allers Familie-Journal in 2004. Its target group was "active women 40 years and older", and its circulation was 42,943 in 2004. The editor was Kirsten Offerdal who also served as the editor of Henne.

It was discontinued in early 2009.
