= Eva, West Virginia =

Unincorporated community in West Virginia, United States

Eva
- Unincorporated community
- Location within the state of West Virginia Eva (the United States)
- Coordinates: 39°01′59″N 81°01′41″W
- Country: United States
- State: West Virginia
- County: Ritchie
- Elevation: 778 ft (237 m)
- Time zone: UTC-5 (Eastern (EST))
  - Summer (DST): UTC-4 (EDT)
- GNIS ID: 1549676

Eva is an unincorporated community in Ritchie County, in the U.S. state of West Virginia.

== History ==
A post office called Eva was established in 1894, and remained in operation until 1950. An early postmaster named the community after his daughter, Eva Gill.
