= Eva (2023 film) =

- Theatrical release poster
- Directed by: Suhaiza Aziz
- Starring: Nadia Aqilah; Nadia Brian; Shamsul Danish
- Production company: D Alpha Legacy
- Release date: January 26, 2023 (Malaysia)
- Country: Malaysia
- Language: Malay

Eva (released in 2023) is Malaysian horror film directed and written by Suhaiza Aziz The film was produced by D Alpha Legacy. It starred Nadia Aqilah, Nadia Brian and Shamsul Danish.

== Cast ==
- Nadia Aqilah as Eva
- Nadia Brian as Elly
- Shamsul Danish as Miqal

== Release ==
Eva was released theatrically in Malaysia, on 26 January 2023. The film was selected as the winner of the 'thriller' and 'suspense' film category for the monthly competition organised by the Cannes Film Festival.
