= Eva (Umberto Tozzi song) =

Single by Umberto Tozzi

from the album Eva
- B-side: "Mama"
- Released: 1982
- Genre: Pop
- Length: 4:28
- Label: CGD
- Songwriters: Umberto Tozzi, Giancarlo Bigazzi

Umberto Tozzi singles chronology
"Notte rosa" (1981)	"Eva" (1982)	"Nell'aria c'è" (1983)

Audio
- "Eva" on YouTube

"Eva" is an Italian-language 1982 song by Umberto Tozzi. It was released as a double-A side with "Mama", and the success of both songs confirmed the singer's early popularity in Italy.

== Track listing ==
No.	Title	Length
1.	"Eva"	4:28
2.	"Mama"	4:38

== Charts ==
Original version
Chart (1982)	Peak position
Italy (Musica e dischi)	8

== Rádio Táxi version ==
In 1983, the Brazilian band Rádio Táxi recorded a successful Portuguese-language version in 1983.
