= Eva Killutat =

Eva Killutat (27 May 1943 – 10 March 2020), professionally known as Eva, was a German-born singer, who gained success in French-speaking countries during the 1960s and 1970s with French chansons.

== Biography ==
Eva was born and raised in Berlin, where she was already performing in clubs as a teenager while still attending a gymnasium (high school). After graduation she decided to pursue French studies and moved to Paris in 1962 to study there. In Paris she was performing in local clubs for two years, singing French and German songs until she was noticed by critics and subsequently got an opportunity to record her first album in 1964. She went on to record a string of albums in the 1960s and 1970s. In 1966 she won a French music prize for newcomers and started to perform successfully in large venues in Paris and Montreal.

Eva mostly recorded French songs on her albums with occasional addition of songs in English or German. In 1974 she published her only German single Alles wird einmal vorübergeh'n. After the 1970s she recorded only occasionally. In 1980 she moved to Quebec, where she recorded her last albums and became a painter as well. Her last album was a collection of Marlene Dietrich songs, which she recorded in 2005. Eva died in Montreal on 10 March 2020.

== Discography ==
=== Albums ===
- 1964: Eva (aka Toi et moi) (Mercury)
- 1965: Eva (aka Comme les blés)
- 1968: Eva (aka Vois) (Mercury)
- 1970: Ou s’en vont mourir les rêves (Barclay)
- 1971: Le cœur battant (Barclay)
- 1972: L’orage (Barclay)
- 1976: Sous les sunlights (Philips)
- 1984: Intérieurs (Saisons)
- 1994: Vertiges (Artic)
- 1997: Comme un Phénix (Intermede)
- 2005: À Marlène (Artic)

=== Compilations ===
- 1971: Plein feux sur Eva (Mercury)
- 1972: Le disque d’or (Mercury)
- 1973: La chanson française (Barclay)
- 1978: Édition la chanson (Philips)
- 1999: De Berlin à Paris (Rym Music)
