= Hywel Evans (civil servant) =

Sir Hywel Wynn Evans, KCB (30 May 1920 – 2 June 1988) was a British civil servant and university administrator.

Born on 30 May 1920, he attended Liverpool Collegiate School and the University of Liverpool. He then served in the Royal Artillery and the Intelligence Corps during the Second World War, before entering HM Civil Service as an official in the Ministry of Labour. He was secretary to the National Economic Development Council, before transferring to the Welsh Office in 1968, where he served as Permanent Secretary from 1971 until 1980. His service was recognised by his appointed as a Companion of the Order of the Bath (CB) in the 1972 New Year Honours and his promotion to Knight Commander (KCB) in the 1976 Birthday Honours.

After retiring, he served as chairman of the Welsh Arts Council and as a member of the court of the University of Wales. In 1986, he became both vice-president of the University College of Swansea and deputy chairman of the Prince of Wales Committee. He died on 2 June 1988.
