= Meriel Tufnell =

English jockey (1948–2002)

Meriel Patricia Tufnell MBE (12 December 1948 – 2002) was an English jockey who was the first female jockey to win a race under Jockey Club rules.

== Biography ==
Tufnell was born in Winchester on 12 December 1948 into a prominent Hampshire family. Her grandmother, Sybil Tufnell, was the first woman in the UK to run a firm of estate agents, and her father was a naval captain who served in the Far East and Australia.

Born with dislocated hips and later suffering childhood asthma, Tufnell overcame these disabilities to ride in gymkhanas and then BSJA showjumping.

Tufnell rode her mother's novice mare, Scorched Earth, to victory in the Goya Stakes at Kempton Park on 6 May 1972, the first ever ladies' flat race held under Jockey Club rules. Neither horse nor jockey had raced previously. The race was the first in a twelve race series for female jockeys, and with three winners from seven rides, Tufnell was the series champion.

Tufnell continued to ride competitively until 1974, including in the first mixed race, at Nottingham, in March 1974, and founded the Lady Jockeys' Association of Great Britain, the first such body in the world, after a meeting at Haydock.

Tufnell was appointed MBE in the 1976 Birthday Honours, a year after retiring from race riding. She opened an equestrian yard and became an instructor, and later went on to train point-to-pointers and hunter chasers with her husband, trainer Glenn Humphrey, whom she married in 1983. The couple separated in 1994.

Tufnell died of cancer in 2002, aged 53, having raised several thousands for Sparks, a childhood cancer charity.
