= Eva (apple) =

Apple cultivar

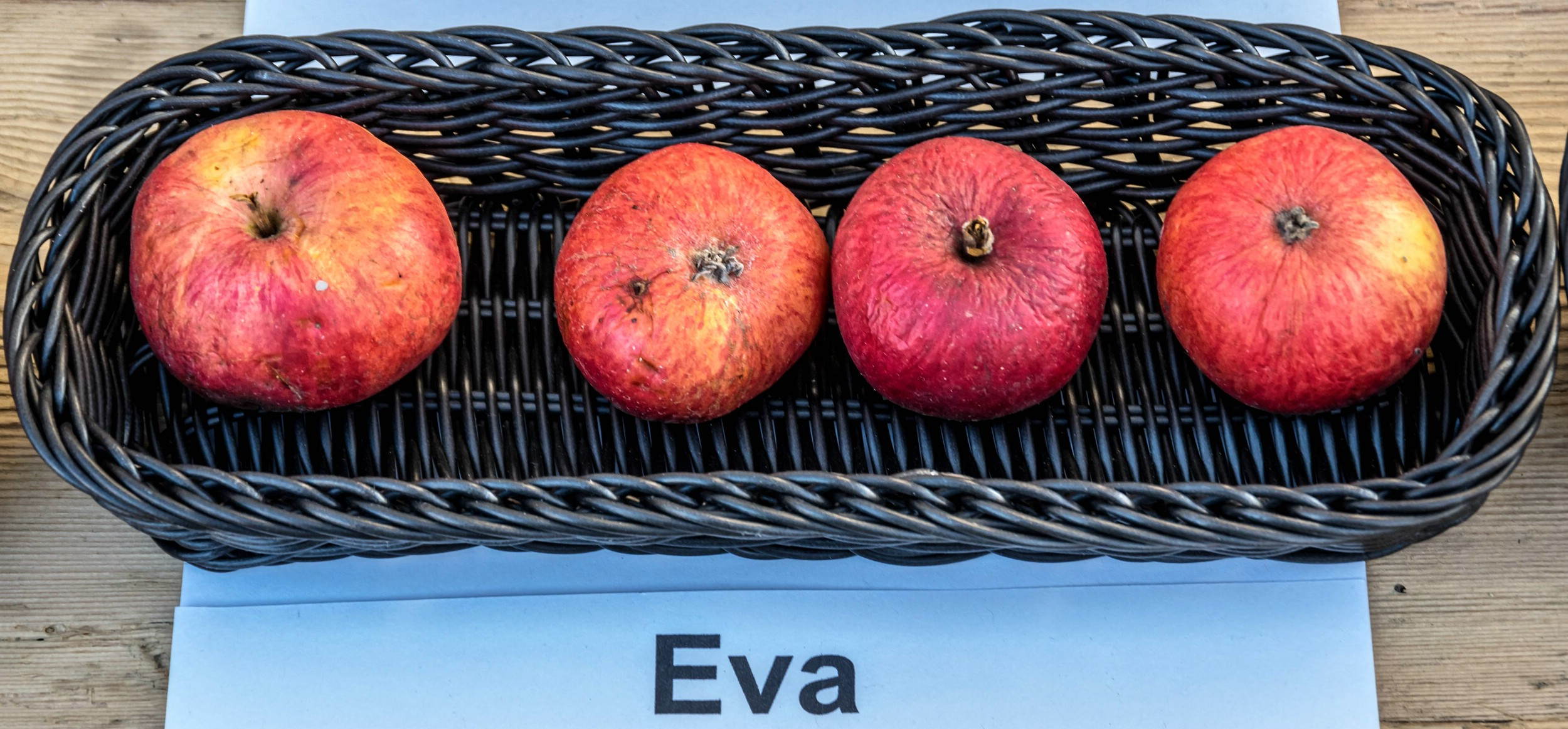
Eva

Eva is an apple variety developed in Brazil in 1999 by researchers in the Instituto Agronômico do Paraná. Like the Julieta cultivar, Eva apples grow and are productive even in tropical climates.
