= John Robin Stephenson =

British Army officer, cricket administrator & rugby union player

Lieutenant Colonel John Robin Stephenson CBE (25 February 1931 – 2 June 2003 (aged 72)) was a British Army officer and cricket administrator.

John Stephenson was born in Hove, Sussex and educated at Christ's Hospital. He played in the School Cricket XI alongside J. A. Bailey and D. R. W. Silk in 1948. He was an excellent rugby player, representing Sandhurst, Richmond and Sussex. He also played cricket for Sandhurst and the Army.

After passing out from Sandhurst, Stephenson was commissioned into the Royal Sussex Regiment, serving in Egypt, Korea, Gibraltar, Libya, Germany and Northern Ireland.

He served as an instructor at the Mons Officer Cadet School (1958–60) and he was the Infantry Representative at the School of Signals (1968–1970). He commanded the 5th Battalion Queen's Regiment from (1973–75) and was appointed military OBE in 1976.

Stephenson was appointed assistant Secretary of the MCC in 1979 and Secretary in 1987. He was noted for his great charm and great aplomb. He was a conciliator, a good organiser and a fine communicator. He managed a club tour to East Africa in 1980–1981, during which his powers of diplomacy came to the fore during a difficult situation at Nairobi Airport.

He hired a public relations firm in 1988 in an effort to improve the club's image and he introduced guided tours at Lord's in 1989, which were popular. He retired in 1993 and was succeeded by Roger Knight. In 1994, he was promoted civil CBE for services to cricket.

Stephenson married Karen Margrethe Koppang in 1962. The couple had a son and two daughters. He died at Salisbury, Wiltshire from a stroke in 2003, aged 72.
