= Monica Gallagher (community worker) =

Australian community worker

Dame Monica Josephine Gallagher, DBE, DCSG (née McInerney; 5 April 1923 – 18 September 2013) was an Australian community worker and church activist.

She had been associated with church and other community groups in her voluntary work. Her positions have included associate member of the New South Wales division of Australian Church Women, member of the advisory committee of the Festival of Light, past chairman of the Appeal Committee, Young Women's Christian Association (YWCA), Sydney, and board member of Save the Children Fund, New South Wales from 1992 to 1994. She was chairman of the Friends of St Mary's Cathedral, Sydney from 1983 to 1987, and later from 1998 to 2000, as well as executive director of the Flower Festival Committee from 1996 to 1997.

== Family ==
Her husband since 1946, Dr. John Gallagher, was a Willoughby physician, who practised for more than 50 years. The couple married in 1946; the couple had four children: Paul, Brian, Julia and Mary-Louise. In 1976, Dr. Gallagher was awarded a papal knighthood. Dr. Gallagher predeceased his wife.

== Death ==
Dame Monica Gallagher died on 18 September 2013, aged 90. She is survived by her children and extended family.

== Awards ==
- The Roman Catholic church acknowledged her work by naming her Dame Commander of the Order of St Gregory the Great in 2001.
- The Roman Catholic church acknowledged her work with the award of a Pro Ecclesia et Pontifice papal honour in 1981.
- Good Citizen Award for Outstanding Community Service in 1979.
- Named Dame Commander of the Order of the British Empire on 12 June 1976 for services to the community.
