= John Read (businessman) =

British businessperson (born 1918)

- Born: 29 March 1918; Brighton, Sussex, England
- Died: 4 April 2015 (aged 97); London, England
- Occupation: Businessman

Sir John Read (29 March 1918 – 4 April 2015) was a British businessman, chairman of EMI and the Trustee Savings Bank.

== Biography ==
Read was born in Brighton on 29 March 1918. His father, William Emms Read was a grocer and his mother was Daisy Elizabeth (Daysie), née Cooper. He studied at Brighton, Hove and Sussex Grammar School, before starting with a local chartered accountancy firm, but joined the Royal Navy during World War II. After managing the convoy supply route across the Atlantic, he was recalled to be secretary to the assistant naval chief of staff, processing intelligence from remote sites such as Bletchley Park and passing it to Winston Churchill's staff.

Read became the youngest commander in the navy at the age of 26 .He married Dorothy Millicent Berry on 14 March in 1942 and they had two sons together. He left the navy in 1946, and joined the Ford Motor Company to complete his accountancy qualification. By 1961, he became director of sales for the company where he was attributed with "[helping] to establish Ford as a British motoring giant in the Sixties".

In 1965, he became finance director for EMI, moving up through the board to chairman in 1974. In 1976, Read received a knighthood, then in 1980 he became chairman for Trustee Savings Bank, where he remained until retirement in 1988. During his career, he also sat on the boards of Post Office, the Armed Forces Pay Review, Dunlop and industrial bodies. Read died on 4 April 2015 at University College Hospital, Camden, London.
