= Eva (social network) =

eva
- Developer: Forbidden Technologies plc
- Initial release: 2015
- Operating system: iOS
- Type: Video sharing
- License: Freeware
- Website: eva.co

eva is a video social network that allows users to record and post short, spontaneous videos from their mobile phones.

== Overview ==
eva is a mobile app and social networking service that was launched by Forbidden Technologies plc - creator of cloud-based video editing software FORscene - in summer 2015. Its co-founders include Stephen B. Streater (founder of Eidos Interactive), Aziz Musa (CEO of Forbidden Technologies plc) and Jens Wikholm (award-winning celebrity and portrait photographer). After holding the beta launch in London in July 2015 - and a subsequent regional launch in Melbourne - eva launched globally in Los Angeles on 1 October 2015. It is available on iOS and can be downloaded from the App Store.

== Using eva ==
In order to make a video on eva, a user simply holds their thumb on the in-app record button and releases it when they are finished. The videos that users take are then automatically uploaded to their personal feed, the wider eva public feed, and grouped by interest topic so they directly become a part of the right communities. Instead of being saved to users' phones, these videos are saved in the cloud, utilising the powerful cloud-based video editing software developed by FORscene. eva has been described by SourceWire as "beautiful, simple and addictive".

== Press Coverage ==
Working with service design consultancy we are experience (or wae), eva's initial structure was created and launched in an incredible 30-day sprint that made waves in the press.

In autumn 2015, eva - working with Chameleon PR - funded research into stereotypes surrounding bearded men, a piece of research that was picked up by over 100 global publications including the Huffington Post, the Independent, and Cosmopolitan (magazine).
