= Eva, Samoa =

Eva
- Village
- Location within Samoa
- Coordinates: 13°52′46″S 171°37′46″W
- Country: Samoa
- District: Atua

Population (2021)
  - Total: 273
- Time zone: -11

Eva is a small village on the northeast coast of Upolu island in Samoa, located midway between the villages of Solosolo and Salelesi. The village is in the electoral constituency of Anoamaa 2, in the Atua district. It had a population of 287 in the 2016 census and 273 in the 2021 census.
