= Philip Watson (Royal Navy officer) =

Royal Navy Vice-Admiral (1919–2009)

Vice-Admiral Sir Philip Watson KBE LVO
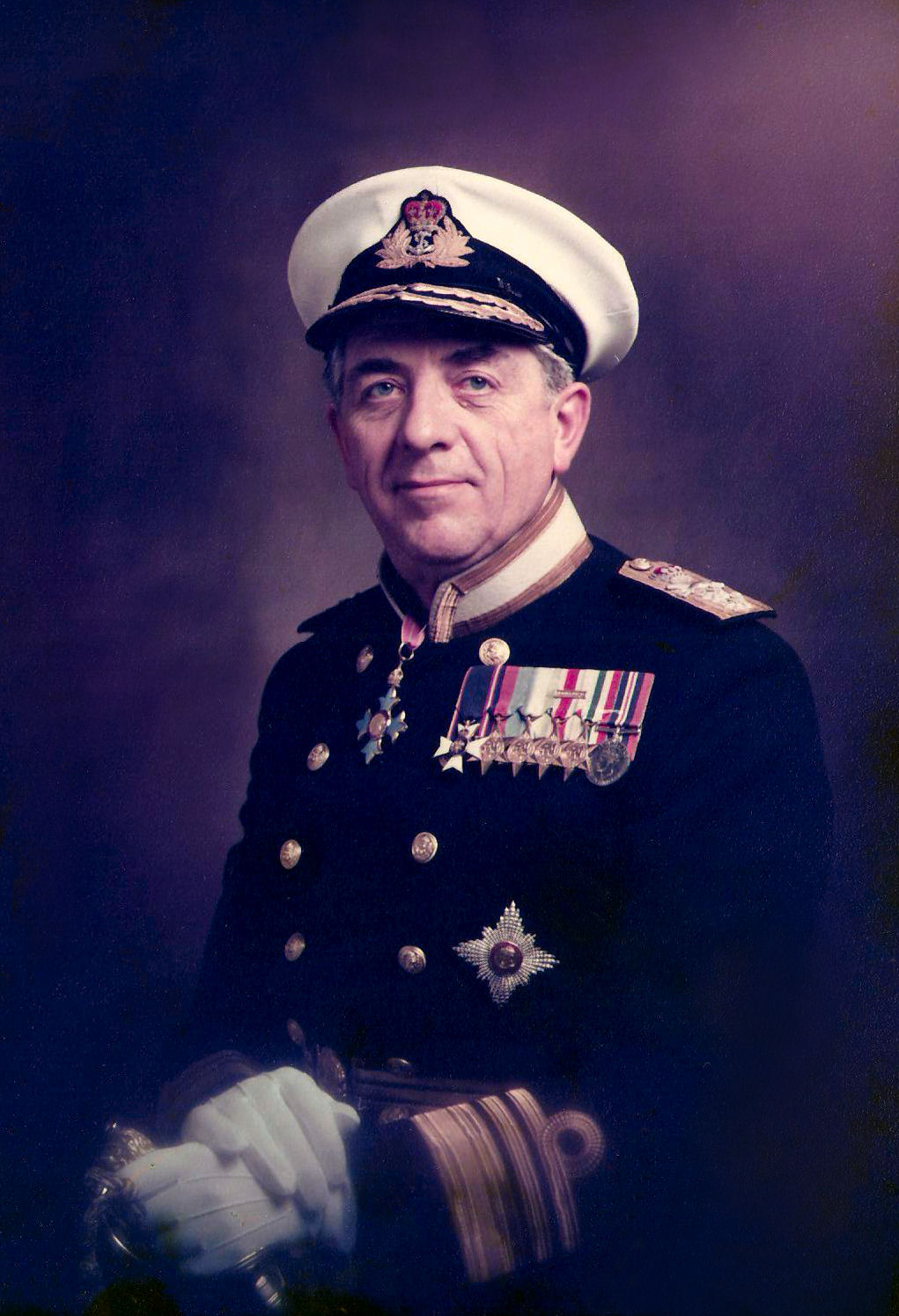
- Sir Philip Watson
- Born: 7 October 1919; Belfast, Northern Ireland
- Died: 8 December 2009 (aged 90)
- Military career
- Allegiance: United Kingdom
- Branch: Royal Navy
- Service years: 1940–1977
- Rank: Vice-Admiral
- Commands: HMS Collingwood
- Conflicts: World War II: Arctic convoys
- Awards: Knight Commander of the Order of the British Empire; Lieutenant of the Royal Victorian Order
- Other work: Royal National Lifeboat Institution

Vice-Admiral Sir Philip Alexander Watson, KBE, LVO (7 October 1919 – 8 December 2009) was a senior Royal Navy officer, rising to the rank of vice-admiral.

== Naval career ==
Watson was born on 7 October 1919 at 93 Limestone Road, Belfast, Northern Ireland to Alexander Henry St Croix Watson (1885–1963) and Gladys Margaret Watson (née Payne). He was baptised on 30 January 1920 and confirmed at St Albans Abbey on 6 December 1934. Educated at St. Albans School he trained as an electrical engineer with the London, Midland and Scottish Railway and joined the Admiralty Compass Observatory, Slough, serving until 10 March 1940 when he was commissioned in the Royal Naval Reserve as an Electrical Sub Lieutenant. He served in HMS Hebe on the Arctic convoys from the United Kingdom to the northern ports of the Soviet Union—Arkhangelsk and Murmansk; in HMS Nelson (Assistant Torpedo Officer) and was at the German surrender at Trondheim when serving in HMS Berwick as Torpedo Officer. He was then transferred to the Royal Navy as a lieutenant in 1946, and served as Naval Assistant to Admiral Bateson.

Watson served with the 5th Destroyer Flotilla, with the Battle-class destroyers HMS Solebay and HMS Gabbard, before moving to the Admiralty in London. A spell at HMS Collingwood as assistant to the training commander followed, with Watson being promoted to lieutenant-commander. He spent two years with the radio section at Malta Dockyard, before becoming electrical officer in HMS Decoy in 1954. Watson was promoted to commander in 1955, and returned to working at the Admiralty.

On 11 December 1948 he married Jennifer Beatrice Tanner and they have two daughters and a son.

Watson spent two years from 1957 as Electrical Officer on board HM Yacht Britannia, for which he was made a member of the Royal Victorian Order. He followed this with a move to Chatham Dockyard where from 1959 he was in command of the electrical shops and weapon section. He went to sea again aboard HMS Lion in 1962, where he served as Weapon Electrical Engineer Officer. He was promoted to captain and joined the Ship Department at Bath where he became involved in the designs of submarines, aircraft carriers and commando ships. In 1967 he became captain of HMS Collingwood, but by 1969 he was back at Bath as deputy director of Engineering (Electrical) in the Ship Department.

He was promoted to Rear-Admiral and made Director-General Weapons (Naval) in 1970, and later promoted again to Vice-Admiral and given the post of Chief Naval Engineer Officer in 1974. He was made a Knight Commander of the Order of the British Empire in 1974 and retired from the navy in March 1977. He became chairman of Marconi Radar Systems between 1981 and 1985.

Before his retirement to Oxfordshire he was a member of the Army and Navy Club and the Bath and County Club. He remained active in the Royal National Lifeboat Institution and the City of Oxford Society of Model Engineers.

He died on 8 December 2009.

== Honours and awards ==

Knight Commander of the Order of the British Empire (KBE)	1974
Lieutenant of the Royal Victorian Order (LVO)	
Member of the Royal Victorian Order (MVO)	For Services onboard HMY Britannia
1939–45 Star	
Atlantic Star	
Arctic Star	2017 (Posthumously)
France and Germany Star	with 'Atlantic' clasp
Italy Star	
War Medal 1939–1945	
