= Electric Vehicle Association of Great Britain =

The Electric Vehicle Association of Great Britain (EVA) was an organisation of the manufacturers of electric vehicles and associated equipment, batteries etc. founded in 1938.
