= SS Maori (1893) =

Shoreline historical wreck in Leeugat Bay on the Cape Peninsula west coast

Coordinates: 34°2′4″S 18°18′48″E

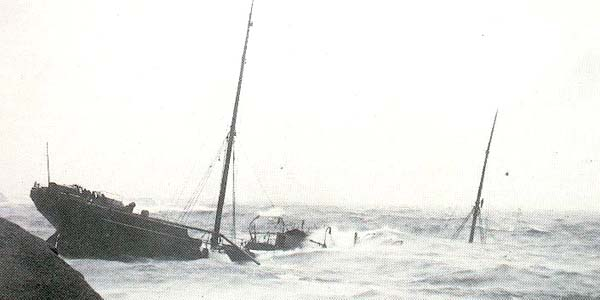
- Maori sinking in 1909

History

United Kingdom
- Name: Maori
- Namesake: Māori
- Owner: Shaw, Saville & Albion Co.
- Operator: Shaw, Saville & Albion Co.
- Port of registry: Southampton
- Builder: C.S. Swan & Hunter, Wallsend
- Yard number: 184
- Launched: 14 August 1893
- Sponsored by: Mrs. James Henderson
- Completed: 28 October 1893
- Maiden voyage: 11 December 1893
- Identification: UK official number 104031; Code letters NFSW
- Fate: Wrecked, 5 August 1909

General characteristics
- Type: Refrigerated Cargo ship
- Tonnage: 5,200 GRT (1893–1897); 5,317 GRT (1897–1909); 4,038 NRT (1893–1897); 4,155 NRT (1897–1909); 7,000 DWT
- Length: 415 ft (126 m) length overall; 402.6 ft (122.7 m) registered length
- Beam: 48.3 ft (14.7 m)
- Depth: 29.6 ft (9.0 m)
- Decks: 3
- Installed power: 461 Nhp
- Propulsion: Central Marine Engine Works 3-cylinder triple expansion
- Speed: 11 knots (20 km/h)
- Crew: 53

Maori was a British refrigerated cargo steamship built in 1893 by C.S. Swan & Hunter of Wallsend-on-Tyne for Shaw, Savill & Albion Co. of London with intention of transporting frozen meat and produce from Australia and New Zealand to the United Kingdom. The vessel stayed on this trade route through her entire career. In August 1909 while on one of her regular trips, she was wrecked on the coast of South Africa with the loss of thirty two of her crew.

== Design and construction ==
Early in 1893 Shaw, Saville & Albion Co. decided to sell their three year-old ship SS Maori and replace her with a bigger vessel capable of carrying large quantities of frozen meat and produce from New Zealand and South America. An order was placed with C.S. Swan & Hunter and the replacement ship was laid down at the builder's shipyard in Wallsend-on-Tyne and launched on 14 August 1893 (yard number 184), with Mrs. James Henderson, wife of the Rector of St. Peter's parish church of Wallsend, serving as a sponsor.

The ship was of the improved three-deck type, specially designed for colonial frozen meat trade and had poop deck, long bridge house and long topgallant forecastle. Maori had her machinery situated amidships and had her hold subdivided by six water-tight bulkheads and had her holds and 'tween decks insulated. The vessel was also equipped with six refrigerating engines provided by Haslam Engineering & Foundry Co. to cool down her insulated chambers designed to carry approximately 70,000 carcasses of mutton. The freighter also possessed all the modern machinery for quick loading and unloading of cargo, including eight steam winches.

As built, the ship was 402.6 feet (122.7 m) long (between perpendiculars) and 48.3 feet (14.7 m) abeam and had a depth of 29.6 feet (9.0 m). Maori was originally assessed at 5,200 GRT and 4,038 NRT and had deadweight of approximately 7,000. The vessel had a steel hull with cellular double bottom throughout and a single 461 nhp triple-expansion steam engine, with cylinders of 29-inch (74 cm), 46-inch (120 cm) and 77-inch (200 cm) diameter with a 48-inch (120 cm) stroke, that drove a single screw propeller, and moved the ship at up to 11.0 knots (12.7 mph; 20.4 km/h).

The sea trials were held on 28 October 1893 off Tynemouth during which the ship performed satisfactorily and was able to achieve mean speed of 12 knots (14 mph; 22 km/h) over several runs on the measured mile. Upon completion, the ship was handed to her owners and proceeded to London for loading.

== Operational history ==
After delivery the ship sailed for London where she entered a drydock on 29 October for examination. Subsequently, the vessel loaded 5,900 tons of general cargo and departed Gravesend on 11 December 1893 bound for New Zealand ports. After an uneventful voyage Maori reached Port Chalmers on 30 January 1894. Upon unloading approximately 3,500 tons of her cargo and taking on board 741 bales of wool in addition to some quantities of sheepskins, basil and rabbit-skins, the ship departed on 7 February for Lyttelton arriving there the next day. While there Maori unloaded the remainder of her cargo and loaded over 10,000 carcasses of frozen mutton. The ship then proceeded to visit the ports of Timaru, Whanganui, Auckland, Gisborne, Napier eventually reaching Wellington on 8 March. At each of these ports the vessel was loading mostly frozen mutton carcasses, but additionally took aboard other cargo such as wool, margarine, stearin, pelts and tallow. Maori sailed out from Wellington on 13 March and reached London on 2 May via Cape of Good Hope and Tenerife, thus successfully completing her maiden voyage.

In a storm on 5 August 1909 Maori ran aground a few kilometres south of the suburb of Llandudno on the west coast of Cape Peninsula near Cape Town. Her crew launched three lifeboats, but her Master and 14 of her crew were left aboard ship.

The coast was remote, inaccessible and very rocky and enormous rollers from the Atlantic Ocean crashed against the formidable granite cliffs that overshadowed the stricken vessel. It was late winter and the water was cold. 32 people died, including her Master and most of his navigating officers.

== Wreck ==
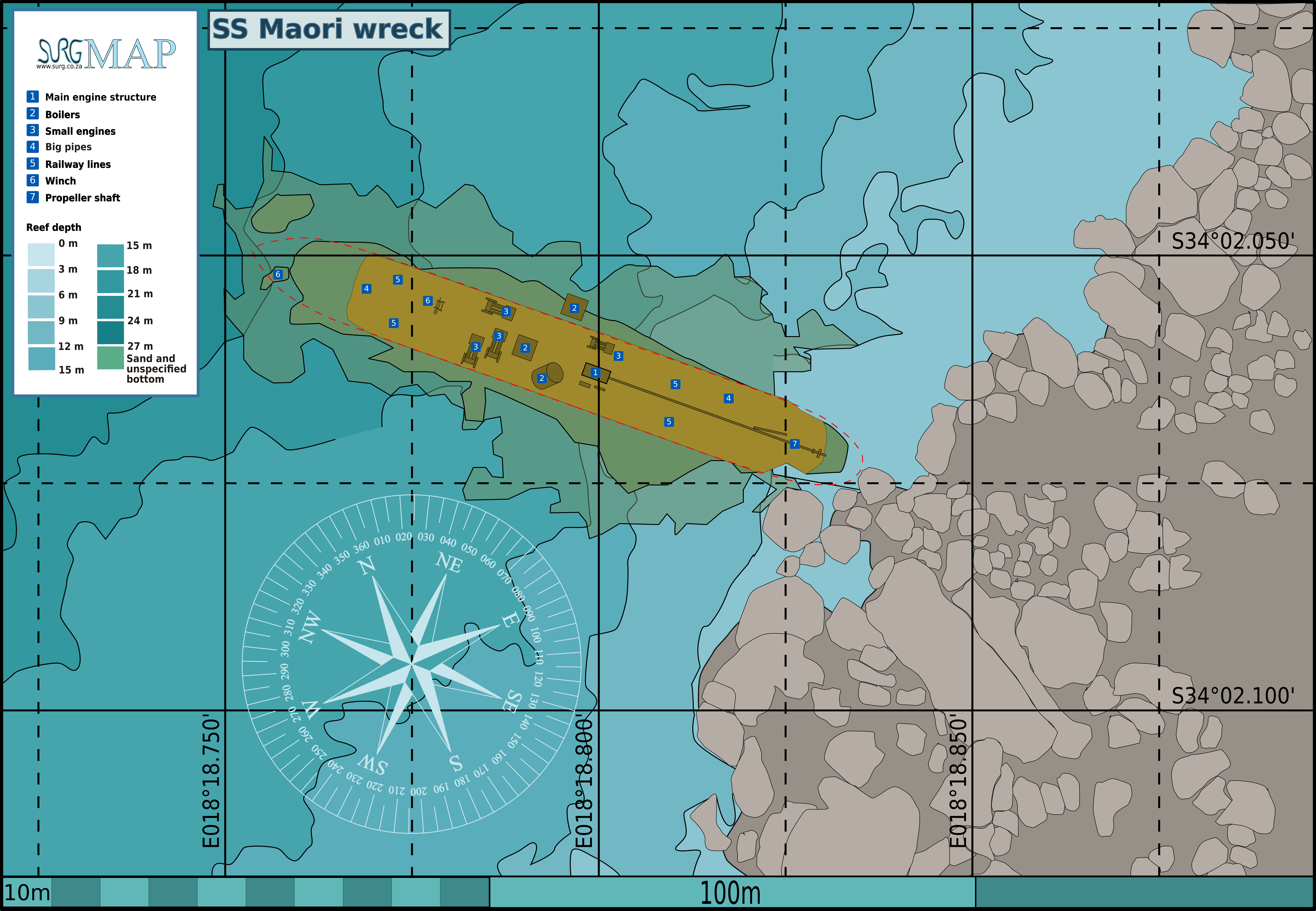
plan of wreck site

The wreck lies in about 24 metres (79 ft) of water between granite boulders. Since the 1960s it has been popular with scuba divers, but it can be visited only when the weather is calm and the prevailing southwesterly swell is low. The hull has been vandalized and much of the general cargo that the ship carried has been removed by hunters of salvage and souvenirs over the years. In the 1970s divers dynamited her hull to search for non-ferrous metal.

The cargo included crockery, rolls of linoleum, champagne and red wine. In the 1970s it was still possible to find bottles of wine scattered about the wreck in the sand. Most of these used to explode when brought to the surface. A few would survive but the wine inside them was impossibly foul.

South Africa's National Heritage Resources Act now protects the wreck. In the right conditions it is a popular scuba wreck diving site.

== See also ==
- Shipwrecks of Cape Town
