= Eve (disambiguation) =

Eve is the first woman created by God according to the creation narrative of Abrahamic religions.

Eve or EVE may also refer to:

== People ==
- Eve (rapper) (born 1978), American recording artist and actress
- Eve (Japanese singer) (born 1995), a Vocaloid producer and Japanese singer-songwriter.

== Places ==
- Eve Cone, a volcano in British Columbia, Canada
- Ève, Oise, a commune in the Oise département of France
- Eve, Kentucky, an unincorporated community
- Eve, Missouri, an unincorporated community

== Technology ==
- Eve (cryptography), a placeholder name for an archetypal eavesdropper
- EVE/ZeBu, a provider of hardware-assisted verification tools
- Eve (robot), a robot scientist working at Aberystwyth University
- EVE (text editor), a text editor provided with the VMS operating system
- VMS Eve, a spacecraft
- European Venus Explorer, a proposed space probe
- Eve, a typeface created by Rudolf Koch
- Eve Systems, German smart home product brand and manufacturer
- EVE, a robot developed by 1X Technologies

== Books and magazines ==
- Eve (magazine), a monthly women's magazine
- Eve (Chase novel), a 1945 psychological thriller novel by James Hadley Chase
- Eve (Young novel), a 2015 Christian fantasy novel by William P. Young
- Eve (Bohannon book), a 2023 science book by Cat Bohannon

== Film and television ==
- Eva (1962 film), a psychological drama film, also known as Eve
- Eve (1968 film), a thriller film
- Eve (2008 film), a short film by Natalie Portman
- Eve (American TV series), a 2003–2006 American television sitcom
- Eve (British TV series), a 2015–2017 British children's TV programme
- "Eve" (The X-Files), a 1993 episode of The X-Files
- "Eve", an episode of Journey to the Unknown
- Eve (South Korean TV series), a 2022 South Korean TV series

=== Fictional characters and items ===
- Eve (Angel), a character in the Joss Whedon TV series Angel
- Eve (Black Cat), a character in the 2000–2004 manga series Black Cat
- Eve (comics), a character in the Neil Gaiman comic book series The Sandman
- Atom Eve, a character in the Robert Kirkman comic book series Invincible
- Eve (The X-Files), the name of multiple female clones in the TV series The X-Files
- EVE (WALL-E), a character in the 2008 Pixar film WALL-E
- Eve (Xena), a character in the TV series Xena: Warrior Princess
- Eve, a member of the musical comedy trio The Kransky Sisters
- Eve, a character in the Species film series
- Eve, a character in the Underworld film series
- Eve, a fictional serum in the 2007 video game BioShock
- Eve Luciano, a character in the 1978–1981 manga series California Story
- Eve Polastri, a character in the 2018—2022 TV series Killing Eve and related Luke Jennings novels
- EVE VIII, a character in the 1991 film Eve of Destruction
- Eve Wakamiya, the keyboardist of the band Pastel*Palettes in the BanG Dream! franchise
- Eve, a character in the 1995 novel Parasite Eve by Hideaki Sena
- Eve, a character in The Binding of Isaac
- Eve, a character in Freedom Force
- EVE (Sonic the Hedgehog), a character in Sonic the Hedgehog comic books
- Eve, a character in the 2000 American fantasy-comedy TV movie Life-Size
- Eve, a character in the 2012 video game Mass Effect 3
- Eve, a character in Season 6 of the series Supernatural
- Eve, a planet in the 2011 video game Kerbal Space Program
- Eve (Stellar Blade), the protagonist from Stellar Blade, which was initially revealed as Project Eve

== Games ==
- Eve: The Second Genesis Collectible Card Game
- Eve Online, a 2003 MMO space simulation computer game
- Peter Gabriel: Eve, a video game created in association with and featuring the music of Peter Gabriel

== Music ==
- Ève (Massenet), a French biblical oratorio by Jules Massenet

=== Bands ===
- Eve (American band) or Honey Ltd.
- Eve (South Korean band), a visual rock band

=== Albums ===
- Eve (Alan Parsons Project album) (1979)
- Eve (Over the Rhine album) (1994)
- Eve (Showta album) (2008)
- Eve, a 2010 album by Ufomammut
- Eve (Emery album) (2018)
- Eve (Rapsody album) (2019)

=== Songs ===
- "Eve" (Jim Capaldi song), 1972
- "Eve" (Idoling!!! song), 2010
- "Eve", song by the Carpenters from Ticket to Ride, 1969
- "Eve", song by Dream Theater from Awake, 1994
- "Eve", song by Spacek, 1999
- "Eve", song by Asking Alexandria from Asking Alexandria, 2017
- "Eve", song by Converge from The Dusk in Us, 2017

== Other uses ==
- Mitochondrial Eve, the matrilineal most recent common ancestor of modern humans
- Eve (cigarette), a brand of cigarette
- EVE (organization), a Vancouver-based advocacy group
- Eve (Collier), a 1911 painting by John Collier
- Eve (Davidson), a 1931 bronze sculpture by Robert Davidson
- Endogenous viral element
- 3,4-Methylenedioxy-N-ethylamphetamine or Eve, an empathogenic psychoactive drug
- Harstad/Narvik Airport, Evenes's IATA code
- The day or night before a special day, usually a holiday, for example Christmas Eve
- NIO Eve, a concept car made by the automotive brand NIO.
- EVE, the Amtrak station code for the Louisville and Nashville Depot (Evergreen, Alabama)
- Eve (platypus) (2004–2026), platypus at the San Diego Zoo Safari Park in California

== See also ==
- Ève
- Ève (disambiguation)
- Eaves
- Eevee, a Pokémon
- Eevee (band), a Philippine band formed in 2004
- Eve 6, a Californian rock band
- Evening
- Evette (disambiguation)
- Evi (disambiguation)
- Evie (disambiguation)
- Evy (disambiguation)
- Ewe language or Eve
- First woman (disambiguation)
- Ive (disambiguation)
- Yve
- Yves (disambiguation)
