= Evy =

Evy or EVY may refer to:

- Evelyn (disambiguation), a female given name
- Evy Palm (born 1942), former Swedish long-distance athlete
- Evy Berggren (1934–2018), Swedish gymnast
- Evy Van Damme (born 1980), Belgian racing cyclist
- Evy-Ann Midttun (1943–2011), Norwegian politician
- Forest Evashevski (1918–2009), nicknamed "Evy", an American football player
- Evy á Lakjuni (born 1999), Faroese footballer
- Evy Kuijpers (born 1995), Dutch professional racing cyclist
- Eric Van Young, professor of history
- Edgardo Vega Yunqué (1936–2008), Puerto Rican writer
- Esther V. Yanai (1928–2003)
- Evy Goffin, member of Lasgo
- Evy Lynch, (born 1991), Irish actress
- Evy Karlsson, a character in the Swedish comedy TV-show Full Frys
- Evy, a character in Go Fish
- Evy Lucío Córdova, the founder and director of San Juan Children's Choir
- Evy, stage name of Évelyne Lenton (a.k.a. Evelyne Verrecchia), French "yé-yé" singer
- EVY, the FAA LID code for Summit Airport, Delaware, United States

== See also ==
- Eevee, a Pokémon
- Eevee (band), a Philippine band formed in 2004
- Evie (disambiguation)
- Eve (disambiguation)
- Evi (disambiguation)
- Ive (disambiguation)
- Ivy (disambiguation)
- Yve
- Ivey (disambiguation)
