= Ivey =

Ivey may refer to:

- Ivey (name), given name and surname
- Ivey, Georgia, United States, a town
- Ivey awards, annual award show celebrating Twin Cities professional theater
- Ivey Business School, unit of University of Western Ontario in Canada
- Ivey Index (IPMI)
- Ivey's, now-defunct upscale department store based out of Charlotte, North Carolina
- The Iveys, rock band which became Badfinger

== See also ==
- Evie (disambiguation)
- Eve (disambiguation)
- Evi (disambiguation)
- Evy (disambiguation)
- Ive (disambiguation)
- Ivy (disambiguation)
- Ivie (disambiguation)
- Yve
- Eevee, Pokémon
- Eevee (band), Philippine band
