= Evi =

Evi or EVI may refer to:

== People ==
- Evi (Midianite king)
- Evi (given name)

== Other uses ==
- Evi (Evi van Lanschot), Van Lanschot Kempen's online investment and savings platform
- EVI (European Vaccine Initiative)
- Evi (software), a British software developer
- .evi, the filename extension used by Envoy (WordPerfect)
- EVI, the ICAO airline designator for the Royal Australian Air Force's transport squadron No. 34
- Enhanced vegetation index
- Evacuation Immediate, a warning issued through the United States Emergency Alert System
- Electronic Valve Instrument, a fingering mode for the EWI wind controller
- Electric vehicle infrastructure

== See also ==
- Eevee, a Pokémon
- Eevee (band), a Philippine band formed in 2004
- Evie (disambiguation)
- Eve (disambiguation)
- Ive (disambiguation)
- Ivy (disambiguation)
- Ivey (disambiguation)
- Evy (disambiguation)
- Yve
