= Evie =

Evie may refer to:

== People and fictional characters ==
- Evie (given name)
- Evie (singer), American contemporary Christian music singer Evelyn Tornquist (born 1957)
- Evie (wrestler), ring name of New Zealand female professional wrestler Cheree Crowley (born 1988)

== Organisations ==
- Project EVIE, a non-profit organization founded in the United States to promote the adoption of electric vehicles
- Evie Magazine, an online American women's magazine

== Other uses ==
- Evie, Orkney, a village on the Mainland, Orkney, Scotland
- Citroën C1 ev'ie, an electric car available in the United Kingdom
- "Evie" (song), a 1974 single by Stevie Wright
- Evie, an artificial intelligence bot using Cleverbot's engine

== See also ==
- Eve (disambiguation)
- Evi (disambiguation)
- Evy (disambiguation)
- Ive (disambiguation)
- Ivy (disambiguation)
- Yve
- Ivey (disambiguation)
- Eevee, a Pokémon
- Eevee (band), a Philippine band formed in 2004
