= Ive =

Ive or IVE may refer to:

== Music ==
- Ive (group), a South Korean girl group
- I've Sound (aka "I've"), a Japanese musical group

== People ==
- Ive (given name), a Croatian and Slovenian given name
- Bert Ive (1875–1939), British-born Australian cinematographer
- John Ive (died 1409), MP for New Romney
- John Ive (MP for Midhurst), represented Midhurst in 1402 and 1415
- Sir Jonathan Ive (born 1967), British industrial designer
- William Ive (disambiguation), several people

== Other uses ==
- "I've", a contraction for "I have"
- Ive, Latvia, a rural municipality in Latvia
- Institute of the Incarnate Word (Instituto del Verbo Encarnado), a Catholic religious order
- International Video Entertainment, a former name of Artisan Entertainment
- Hong Kong Institute of Vocational Education
- River Ive, in Cumbria, England
- St Ive, a village in Cornwall, England

== See also ==
- Ives, a surname
- Evie (disambiguation)
- Eve (disambiguation)
- Evi (disambiguation)
- Evy (disambiguation)
- Ivy (disambiguation)
- Yve
- Ivey (disambiguation)
- Eevee
