= Ivey (name) =

Ivey is a given name and surname. Notable people with the name include:

== Given name ==
- Ivey P. Crutchfield (1878–1952), American architect
- Ivey Dickson (1919–2014), English pianist, teacher and musical director
- Ivey William Gregory (1906–1984), American politician
- Ivey Hutchings, African-American politician
- Ivey Foreman Lewis (1882–1964), American botanist and geneticist
- Ivey Shiver (1907–1972), outfielder in Major League Baseball
- Ivey Wingo (1890–1941), Major League Baseball catcher

== Surname ==
- Anna Ivey, American academic and writer
- Artis Ivey Jr. or Coolio (1963–2022), American rapper and actor
- Barry Ivey (born 1979), Louisiana politician
- Bill Ivey (1944–2025), American folklorist and author
- Dana Ivey (born 1941), American actress
- D. J. Ivey (born 2000), American football player
- Donald Ivey (1922–2018), Canadian physics professor, first host of The Nature of Things
- Eowyn Ivey (born 1973), American author
- Ford Ivey, American founder of live action role-playing games
- George Ivey (1923–1979), English professional footballer
- Glenn Ivey (born 1961), American politician
- Jaden Ivey (born 2002), American basketball player
- James Ivey, artist from San Diego, California
- Jared Ivey (born 2001), American football player
- Jean Eichelberger Ivey (1923–2010), American composer
- Jim Ivey (1925–2022) American editorial cartoonist
- John E. Ivey Jr. (1919–1992), American educator
- Jolene Ivey (born 1961), American politician
- Judith Ivey (born 1951), American actress
- Kay Ivey (born 1944), American politician and governor of Alabama
- Martez Ivey (born 1995), American football player
- Mitch Ivey (born 1949), American swimmer and swimming coach
- Niele Ivey (born 1977), American basketball player and coach
- Paul Ivey (born 1961), English former professional footballer
- Phil Ivey (born 1976), American poker player
- Richard M. Ivey (1925–2019), Canadian lawyer and philanthropist
- Royal Ivey (born 1981), American basketball player
- Susan Ivey (born 1958), chairman and chief executive officer, Reynolds American
- Travis Ivey (born 1986), American football nose tackle
- Tyler Ivey (born 1996), American baseball player
- William Edward Ivey (1838–1892), New Zealand agricultural scientist and director

== See also ==
- Ivy (name), given name and surname
- Ivie, given name and surname
