= Ève (disambiguation) =

Ève is a given name, and is French for "Eve".

Ève may also refer to:

- Ève (Massenet), an oratorio by Jules Massenet
- Ève, Oise – commune in the Oise department, France

== See also ==
- Eve (disambiguation)
- Marie-Ève
