= The Ivy =

The Ivy may refer to one of the following restaurants:

- The Ivy (Los Angeles), a restaurant in Los Angeles, California, United States
- The Ivy (United Kingdom), a restaurant in London, United Kingdom
- The Ivy (film), a 2025 drama film

== See also ==
- Ivy (disambiguation)
