= Ivy (name) =

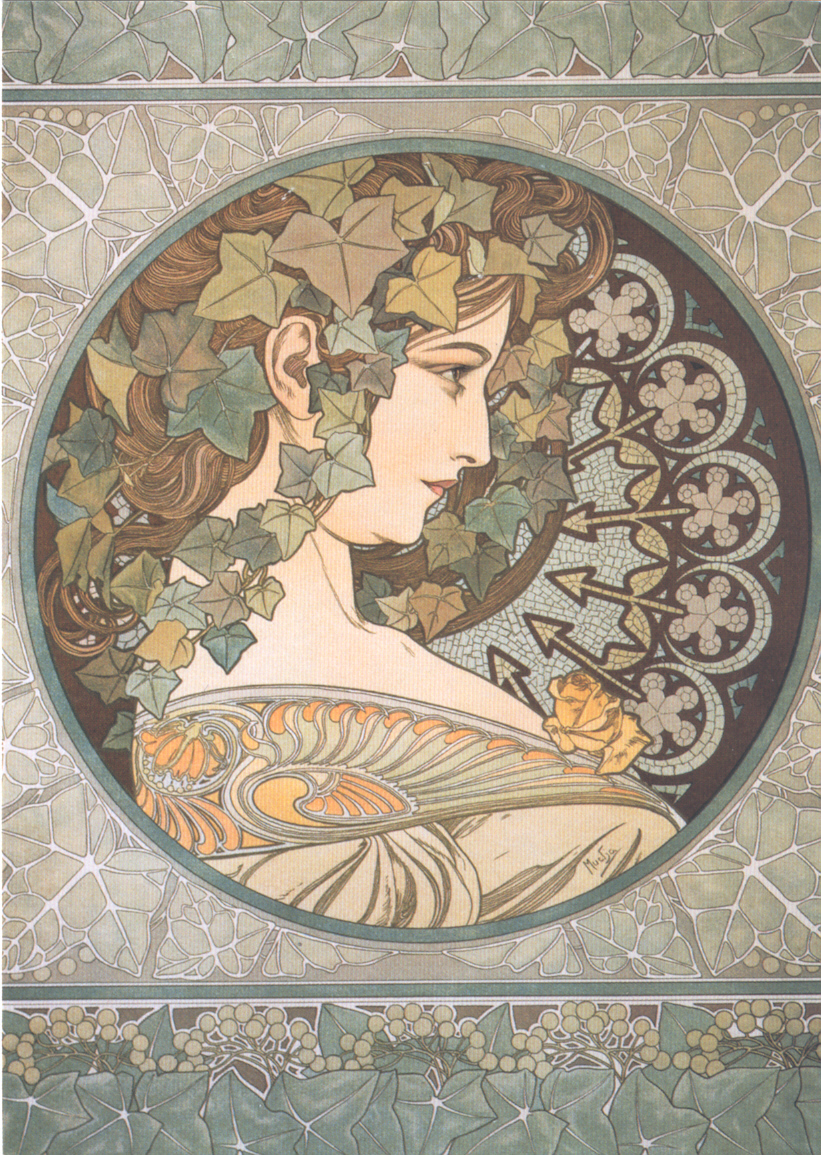
- Ivy by Alfons Mucha, 1901.
- Pronunciation: /ˈaɪvi/
- Gender: Unisex
- Language: English

Origin
- Meaning: Hedera

Ivy is a given name or surname taken from the name of the plant. It became popular as a given name in the late 1800s, along with other plant and flower names for girls.

As a given name for girls, Ivy first entered the Top 200 in England and Wales in 1880, when it ranked #180, and reached the height of popularity when it was the 16th most popular name in England and Wales in 1904. It has again risen in popularity and, as of 2020, Ivy was the sixth most popular girls' name in England and Wales. It has also risen in popularity in other English- speaking countries.

It has ranked among the top 50 names for newborn American girls since 2021 and was the 42nd most used name for girls there in 2022. In 2022, it was the 33rd most popular name given to girls in Canada. Other botanical names are also currently fashionable, as are other names that contain the letter v.

Notable people with the name include:

== Given name ==
- Ivy (Chinese singer) (born 1987), Chinese singer
- Ivy (South Korean singer) (born 1982), South Korean singer and musical actress
- Ivy Adara (born 1995), Australian singer and composer
- Ivy Alvarez, Filipina Australian poet, editor, and reviewer
- Ivy Andrews (1907–1970), American Major League Baseball pitcher
- Ivy Austin (born 1958), American actress, singer, and voice-over artist
- Ivy Baxter (1923–1993), Jamaican dancer and choreographer
- Ivy Baldwin (1866–1953), American balloonist and aeronaut
- Ivy Bean (1905–2010), British internet personality
- Ivy May Bolton (1879–1961), British Anglican nun and writer
- Ivy Bottini (1926–2021), American women's rights and LGBT rights activist
- Ivy Calvin (born 1971), American former football player and TV personality
- Ivy Campany (1901–2008), British World War I veteran
- Ivy Cavendish-Bentinck, Duchess of Portland (1887–1982), Duchess of Portland
- Ivy Chen (born 1982), Taiwanese actress
- Ivy Claire Amoko (born 1987), Ugandan chess player
- Ivy Close (1890–1968), British actress
- Ivy Compton-Burnett (1884–1969), English novelist
- Ivy Cooke (1916–2017), Jamaican educator
- Ivy Copeland (1888–1961), New Zealand artist and art teacher
- Ivy Cummings (1901–1971), British early racing car driver
- Ivy Duffy Doherty (1922–2008), Australian-American writer
- Ivy Duke (1896–1937), British actress
- Ivy Fife (1905–1976), New Zealand painter
- Ivy Forster (1907–1997), Jersey politician
- Ivy Gibbs (1866–1966), trans-Tasman poet and children's writer
- Ivy Griffin (1896–1957), American Major League Baseball first baseman
- Ivy Gunter (born 1950), American model and inspirational speaker
- Ivy Ho (born 1958), Hong Kong screenwriter and film director
- Ivy Jo Hunter, American songwriter, record producer and singer
- Ivy Joe Hunter (born 1966), American former professional American football player
- Ivy Kellerman Reed (1877–1968), American author
- Ivy Frances Klein (1895–1972), British composer, pianist and singer
- Ivy Kirksey (born 1902), American baseball player
- Ivy Lacsina (born 1999), Filipino volleyball player
- Ivy Lee (1877–1934), American publicity expert
- Ivy Liu, Taiwanese and New Zealand statistician
- Ivy Matsepe-Casaburri (1937–2009), South African politician
- Ivy Meeropol (born 1968), director and producer of documentaries for film and television
- Ivy Olson (1885–1965), American professional baseball shortstop
- Ivy Parker (1907–1985), American chemist and engineer
- Ivy Baker Priest (1905–1975), American politician
- Ivy Quainoo (born 1992), German singer
- Ivy Rahman (1936–2004), Bangladeshi politician
- Ivy Ruckman (1931–2021), American author
- Ivy St. Helier (1886–1971), British stage actress, composer and lyricist
- Ivy Scott (1886–1947), Australian stage actress and opera singer
- Ivy Scarborough, American author and lawyer
- Ivy Shore (1915–1999), Australian painter
- Ivy Sole (born 1995), American rapper and record producer
- Ivy Tan, Singaporean radio and TV presenter
- Ivy Tresmand (1898–1980), English soubrette
- Ivy Troutman (1884–1979), American actress
- Ivy Walker (1911–?), English athlete
- Ivy Wallace (1915–2006), British artist, actress and author
- Ivy Weber (1892–1976), Australian politician
- Ivy Wedgwood (1896–1975), Australian politician
- Ivy Williams (1877–1966), British barrister and law scholar
- Ivy Williamson (1911–1969), American player and coach of American football and basketball
- Ivy Winters (born 1986), American drag performer, singer and actor
- Ivy Wolk (born 2004), American actress and comedian

== Fictional characters ==
- Poison Ivy, in the Batman franchise
- Ivy Aberdeen, in the book Ivy Aberdeen's Letter to the World by Ashley Herring Blake
- Ivy Ling, an American Girl character
- Ivy Sundew, a supporting character from the 2019 Disney Channel animated series Amphibia
- Ivy Tilsley, in the soap opera Coronation Street
- Ivy Valentine, in the Soulcalibur series of video games
- Ivy Wentz, a recurring character in the 2010 Disney Channel sitcom Good Luck Charlie
- Ivy, in the 1990s animated television series Where on Earth Is Carmen Sandiego?
- Ivy, a character from the 2022 Disney+ original series Cars on the Road
- Ivy (Blame!), from the manga Blame!
- Ivy, in the children's book series Ivy + Bean
- OPCI_2501_IV, or Ivy, a character in the rhythm game Cytus II
- Ivy, in the upcoming game Deadlock

== Surname ==
- Andrew Conway Ivy (1893–1978), American doctor
- Bill Ivy (1942–1969), British motorcycle racer
- Corey Ivy (born 1977), American football player
- Cotton Ivy (1930–2021), American politician
- Gregory Ivy (1904–1985), American art professor
- Hardy Ivy (1779–1842), American settler
- Johnathan Ivy (born 1992), American basketball player
- Julie Ivy, American health care statistician
- Khori Ivy (born 1978), American football player
- Mortty Ivy (born 1986), American football player
- Pop Ivy (1916–2003), American football player and coach
- Veronica Ivy, Canadian transgender rights activist

== See also ==
- Ivey (name), includes a list of people with the surname or given name
