= Zebu (disambiguation) =

Zebu is a species or subspecies of domestic cattle.

Zebu may also refer to:

- EVE/ZeBu, company
- Zebu (ship), a tall ship
