= Sexuality of Whitney Houston =

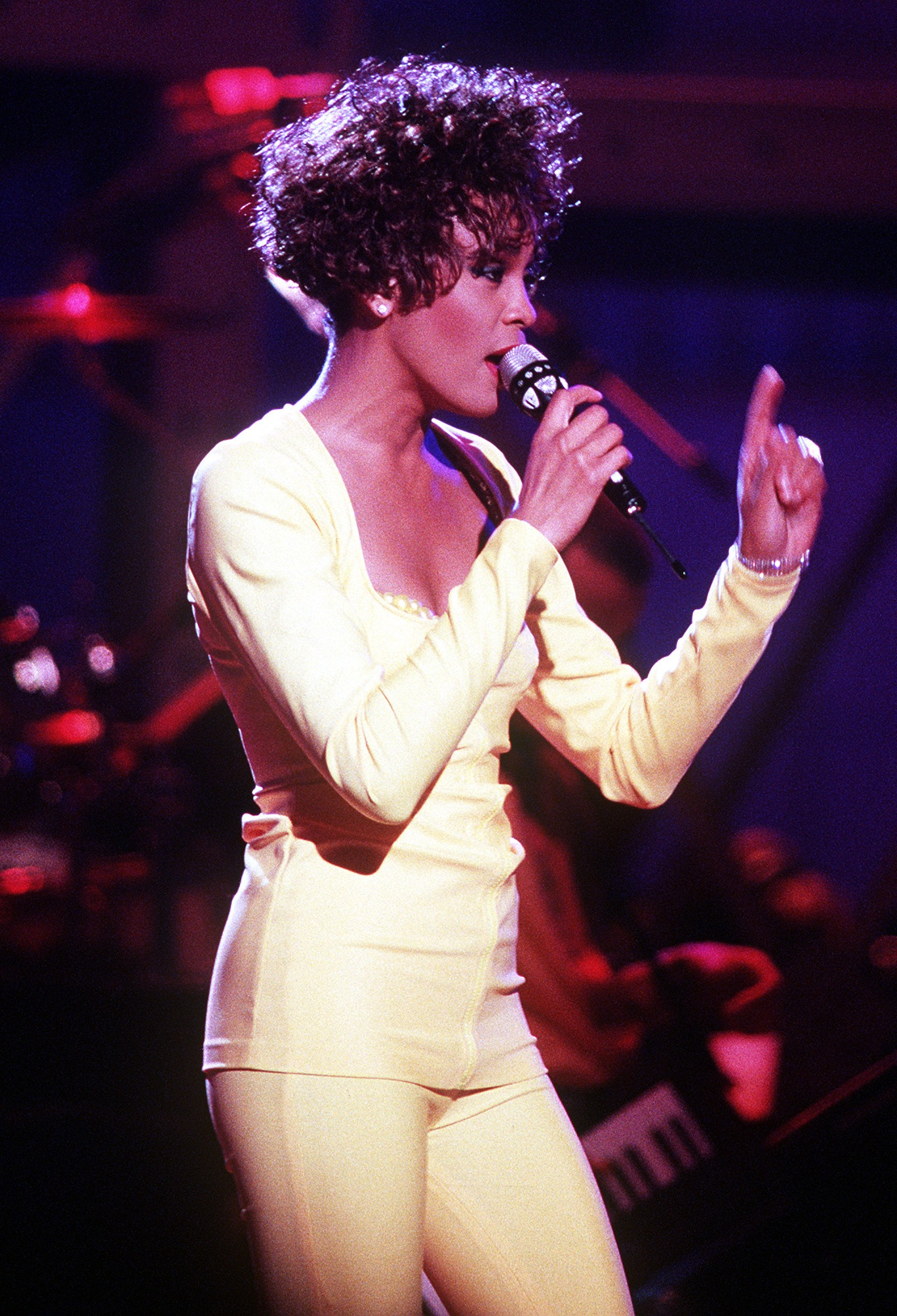
Whitney Houston in 1991

The sexuality of American cultural icon Whitney Houston has been the topic of debate and discussion. During her early career, speculation on Houston's close relationship with personal assistant Robyn Crawford led many tabloid media reporters to bring up rumors that Houston was a "closeted lesbian". Houston was often broached on the subject and constantly denied that she and Crawford were ever sexually intimate and denied she was gay. Houston married singer Bobby Brown in 1992 and while she would have her only child, daughter Bobbi Kristina Brown, with her husband, many in the tabloid and mainstream press believed Houston only married Brown to quiet any speculation on her sexuality, a claim Bobby Brown himself later believed. Prior to Brown, Houston had few relationships with men, including a secretive affair with Jermaine Jackson, which inspired the recording and music video to Houston's hit, "Saving All My Love for You", as well as with Eddie Murphy, who was reportedly "elusive", and an alleged brief fling with fellow pop singer Michael Jackson.

Following the singer's death in 2012, some members of Houston's family and several former employees began to speak on the relationship of Houston and Crawford and concluded that Houston was either bisexual or sexually fluid. Houston's ex-husband Bobby Brown also claimed he knew Houston was bisexual and felt if Crawford hadn't been pushed out of her life and that Houston's family had accepted her bisexuality that the singer would still be alive. In addition, rumors reported a love triangle between Houston and actresses Jodie Foster and Kelly McGillis, with the latter denying ever meeting Houston. According to her sister-in-law, Houston reportedly engaged in same-sex affairs with women during the latter years of her marriage to Brown. In 2019, seven years after Houston's death, Robyn Crawford admitted to a same-sex relationship with the singer in the early years of their friendship during the early 1980s with Houston putting a stop to it, fearing negative effects of her future career in music.

== Relationship with Robyn Crawford ==
Houston met Robyn Crawford at the East Orange Community Development Center where the two found work as summer camp counselors for children, not far from Houston's childhood Dodd Street residence in East Orange, New Jersey, in August 1980, days prior to Houston's 17th birthday. According to Crawford, following their introduction to one another, she told Houston, "I'm gonna look out for you". Not too long afterwards, Houston told her "stick with me and I'll take you around the world."

At the time of their meeting, Houston was the leading singer of the youth choir at New Hope Baptist Church, a professional session vocalist, fashion model and a junior at her school, Mount Saint Dominic Academy, while Crawford was a collegiate basketball player who was then attending Monmouth University on a basketball scholarship.

Houston later recounted their first meeting, stating: "I was 16 and we were working at summer jobs and I remember thinking, 'Wow, this is really going to be a trip this summer — I don't have any friends'. And then here comes Robyn with this beautiful, beautiful Afro. She was tall and very statuesque and I was like, 'Wow, man.' She stood up for me. I remember thinking, I've known this person seems like all my life." Houston had been the target of female bullies going back to grade school and stated Crawford stood up to her bullies. The singer later stated Crawford was "the sister I never had". As they got acquainted, according to Crawford, the young women's relationship grabbed the attention of residents of their East Orange neighborhood and the pair would occasionally encounter homophobic reactions.

Weeks later, Houston and Crawford, then 19 years old, shared their first kiss together at Houston's home, with the singer stopping, telling Crawford, "if I knew when my brothers were coming home, I'd show you something."

Following a performance at New Hope Baptist Church one Sunday, Houston and Crawford spent time at an apartment owned by Houston's cousin where, after eating fast food and reading the Bible while smoking marijuana together, they made love, starting what would be a two-year romance. During this era, Houston and Crawford began venturing gay clubs together at Asbury Park and did little to hide their affair. At one point, after leaving a gay club, they removed their clothes and made love in Houston's cousin Dee Dee's Cadillac and were told by a cop to move out of the section after they were spotted.

Though Houston's mother, Cissy Houston, later claimed she wasn't sure if her daughter was romantically involved with Crawford, she didn't approve of their close relationship. At one point, according to Crawford, Cissy recited a Biblical verse to her daughter and told her it "wasn't natural for two women to be that close"; Houston ignored her mother's advice.

In February 1982, Houston came to the apartment Crawford shared with her mother and gave her a gift which included a "slate-blue Bible" inside, telling Crawford that they have to stop their romantic affair.

Said Crawford: "she said we shouldn't be physical anymore because it would make our journey more difficult. She said if people find out about us, they would use this against us. And back in the '80s, that's how it felt." Crawford and Houston each wrote "a page about our love, pledged that we would always be loyal, and left our past there." Shortly afterwards, the pair moved together to a two-bedroom apartment at Woodbridge Township, New Jersey and continued their platonic relationship.

Later that fall, less than a few months before Houston signed with Arista Records, Crawford dropped out of Monmouth University to follow and aid Houston's career, much to the chagrin of Crawford's mother Janet.

Crawford became Houston's personal assistant shortly after Houston released her debut album. Eventually, Crawford moved up to being Houston's executive assistant after she formed her production company Nippy Inc., and, finally, creative director.

Crawford was featured in the background singing in the music video to Houston's first hit single, "You Give Good Love".

Despite Houston and Crawford reportedly ending the sexual part of their friendship in 1982, speculation on their relationship would eventually hit the media, after Houston's self-titled debut album became a hit in 1985. That year, Houston wanted to fly Crawford to join her at a black radio convention in Philadelphia, which caught the attention of radio disk jockeys and tabloid newspapers alike.

Houston and Crawford often shared the same hotel room and when Houston moved to bigger residences, Crawford accompanied her. As Houston's fame grew, her father John Houston advised the pair to stay apart from each other during public appearances and date men to avoid suspicion.

Author Gerrick Kennedy later wrote in 2022, "The public concluded [in the 1980s] that Whitney was a closet lesbian and she and Robyn were star-crossed lovers doomed by the oppression of society and Whitney’s religious family."

During a 1987 interview with Time magazine, both Houston and Crawford denied reports of being engaged in a relationship. Crawford told the publication, "I tell my family, 'You can hear anything on the streets, but if you don't hear it from me, it's not true'." Houston added: "My mother taught me that when you stand in the truth and someone tells a lie about you, don't fight it. I'm not with any man. I'm not in love. People see Robyn with me, and they draw their own conclusions. Anyway, whose business is it if you're gay or like dogs? What others do shouldn't matter. Let people talk. It doesn't bother me because I know I'm not gay. I don't care."

Houston would constantly be broached on the subject of Crawford and her sexuality for the first fifteen years of her career in the spotlight.

In 1990, Houston and Crawford were interviewed by journalist Roger Friedman for a cover story in the magazine, Fame, around the time of the release of I'm Your Baby Tonight. Because Friedman hadn't asked them about their relationship, the two women freely addressed their future plans for Houston's career. But when the issue came out that October under the title Secret Life of Whitney Houston by the magazine's top editor, both women were furious.

After the anger subsided, Houston told Crawford, "this is what my mother meant when she said 'they build you up to tear you down'. You know what? They'll never, ever get anything from me again." The incident impacted how Houston felt about doing interviews.

During her interview with Katie Couric in 1996, Houston said, "This wasn't her world. I brought [Crawford] into this madness. She goes, 'why am I the target, what did I do?' I said 'you're my friend, what else do you want? You play basketball, they think you're a man, I don't know!' She's a damn good basketball player, she can beat any man there is, I love it."

In 1992, Houston made Crawford the maid of honor at her wedding to Bobby Brown. Crawford would claim Houston became isolated following her marriage to Brown, leading to a gradual estrangement in Houston and Crawford's friendship. Crawford, who had been living in Houston's Mendham residence prior to the marriage, relocated to a house five blocks away, paid for by the singer. Crawford wrote that she didn't get Houston's attraction to Brown and stated their marriage was "like watching a foreign film without subtitles." Crawford left Houston's employ in May 2000. Crawford and Houston last physically saw each other following the taping of VH1 Divas Duets in May 2003.

Following Houston's death in 2012, Crawford released a letter expressing her grief over the loss of Houston and attended her memorial service. In 2019, after nearly 40 years, Crawford released her memoirs, A Song for You: My Life with Whitney Houston, where she finally admitted that she and Houston had an intimate affair; the book later became a New York Times best-seller.

Prior to Crawford's revelation of the romantic part of their relationship, two Houston documentary films, 2017's Whitney: Can I Be Me and 2018's Whitney, brought up the subject with the latter film's director Kevin Macdonald explaining "I think it's fairly obvious when you talk to the family and friends, nobody is denying that Whitney and Robyn had a physical relationship — a sexual relationship. They were partners for a number of years. My understanding is that relationship was over in a romantic sense by the mid-'80s when Whitney became a big star."

Their early romance was dramatized in the 2022 Houston biopic, Whitney Houston: I Wanna Dance with Somebody, with Naomi Ackie as Houston and Nafessa Williams as Crawford.

== Relationships with men ==
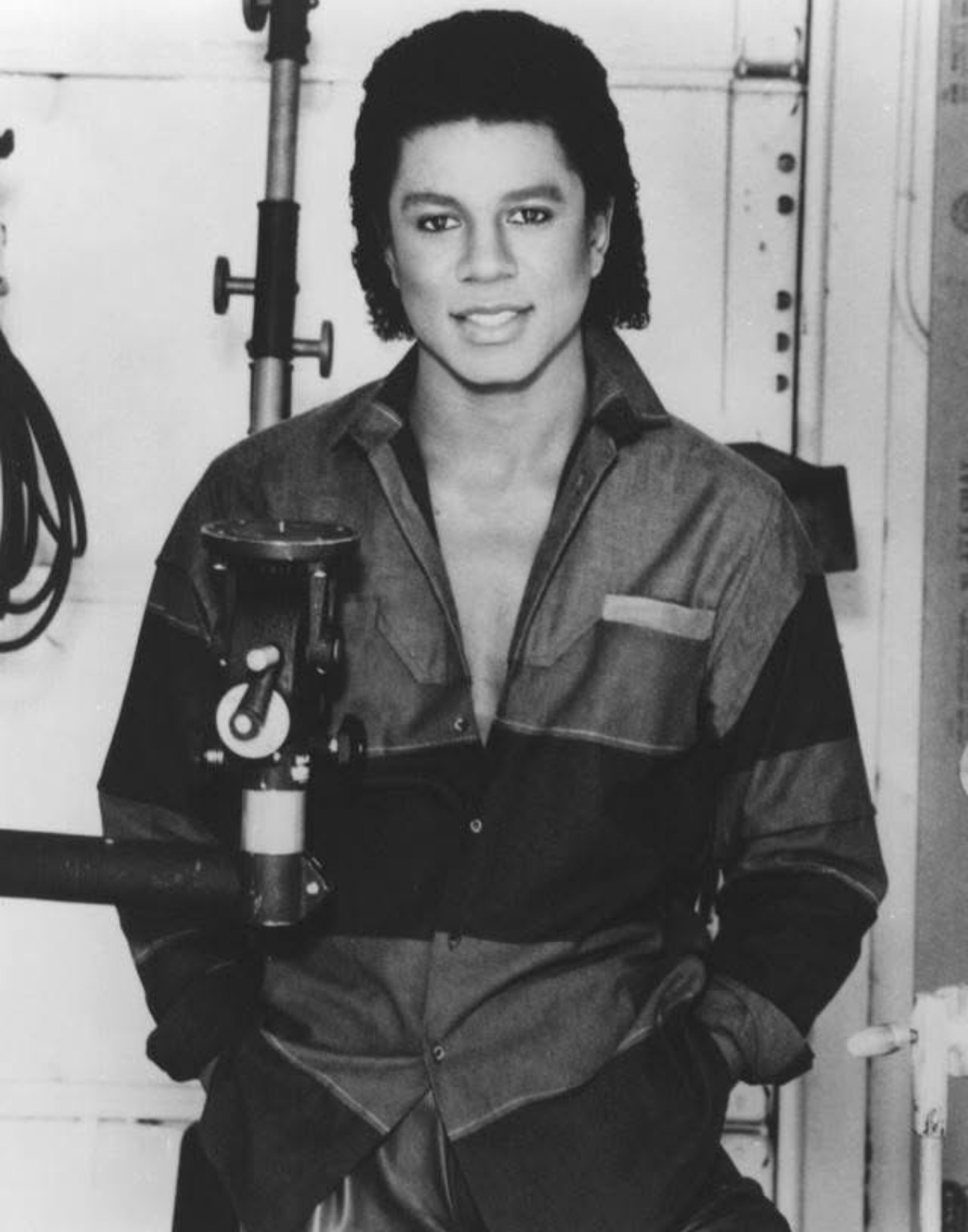
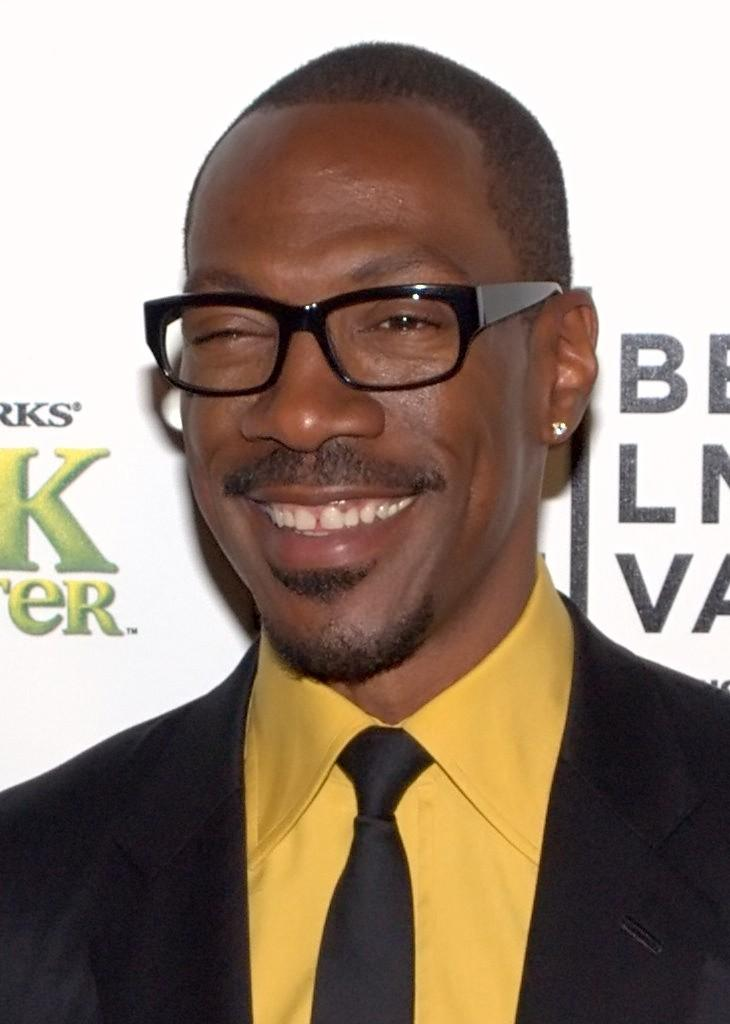
Houston reportedly had stormy affairs with Jermaine Jackson (pictured in 1984) and Eddie Murphy (pictured in 2010) though both denied an affair with Houston.

Following the ending of her sexual relationship with Crawford, Houston began a torrid, secretive one-year affair with American singer Jermaine Jackson, who was nine years Houston's senior.

Though initially reluctant to share details of her relationship with Jackson to Crawford, Houston eventually told her of their affair, with Crawford warning her that Jackson was still married to his first wife, Hazel Gordy, daughter of Motown founder Berry Gordy. According to Crawford, Jackson was "smuggled into hotel rooms" with Houston, worked late nights on duets with her and the 20-year-old Houston even had a nickname for Jackson, "Ji".

The affair reportedly alarmed Jackson's brother Michael, who warned him that the affair could destroy both his and Houston's careers. Houston and Jackson appeared on TV together performing on the soap opera, As the World Turns. According to Robyn Crawford, the affair broke when Houston was angered that Jackson had reneged on a promise to give Houston and Crawford tickets to see the Jacksons's Victory Tour at Madison Square Garden around July 1984, which led to Houston going off on vacation in Antigua by herself and refusing to give Jackson her phone number. Others reported that Houston angrily broke off the affair because Jackson wouldn't leave his wife Hazel.

The relationship and the subsequent breakup reportedly inspired the recording and music video of Houston's rendition of "Saving All My Love for You", which became Houston's first US number-one hit in 1985. While Houston initially denied the song had anything to do with her personal life, in 1999, the singer admitted she recorded the song from experience of being with a married man though she never named Jackson, stating "I was going through a terrible love affair. He was married, and that will never work out for anybody. Never."

Publicly, Jackson has denied an affair with Houston had occurred though he later stated of their relationship while making music with the young singer: "These were turning into duets between temptation and forbidden love [...] I arrived on those days with butterflies, because the whole experience of being around Whitney was intoxicating [...] it became increasingly hard to sing love songs with all that emotion and unspoken passion between us." Houston and Jackson maintained a friendship that lasted until Houston's death in 2012. Following the death of Jackson's brother Michael, Houston reportedly consoled the musician; subsequently following Houston's own death three years later, Jackson was reportedly "too distraught" to attend her funeral.

Houston also had brief affairs with Brad Johnson, a Manhattan restaurateur, and American football star Randall Cunningham. Johnson was featured in the music video of Houston's 1988 hit, "Where Do Broken Hearts Go" while rumors emerged that Houston's 1987 hit, "Didn't We Almost Have It All" was inspired by the initial mid-1980s relationship of her and Cunningham.

In 1988, Houston began another torrid affair with comedian and actor Eddie Murphy, who was reportedly elusive towards the singer throughout their nearly two-year relationship. According to Houston's childhood babysitter and caretaker, Ellen White, the singer was "infatuated" with Murphy and was "so enamored" by the actor that she watched his film, Coming to America, "more than once", stating the two "shared something special". "I watched them once at a party," White recalled. "Eddie came in, cameras were flashing and they just looked at each other and talked and laughed like they were the only two people in the room." At one point during the affair, Houston had invited Murphy to her house in Mendham, New Jersey where she prepared dinner for him only for Murphy to never show up which, according to Robyn Crawford "devastated" Houston.

Crawford claimed later that Houston "lost herself" in her pursuit of the actor. Eventually by late 1989, Houston decided to end the "elusive" affair. According to Houston's longtime producer Narada Michael Walden, who also was friends with Murphy, Houston was deeply affected by the Murphy relationship after noticing Houston being unusually "quiet and workmanlike" while working on the song "Feels So Good" during sessions of the I'm Your Baby Tonight album. As Walden replayed "Feels So Good", he received a phone call from his guru who told him "please watch out for Whitney Houston", sensing the singer was "very troubled, very depressed, almost close to death", which alarmed Walden. When Houston returned to the recording studio the next day, Walden asked her if something was bothering her, to which Houston opened up to him about the breakup with Murphy and how Murphy "led her on" throughout the ill-fated yearlong affair. Walden concluded the affair with Murphy "worn her out".

On the day Houston planned to marry singer Bobby Brown in 1992, Murphy called Houston and warned her that she was "making a mistake" by marrying Brown, which Houston ignored and subsequently hung up on him, deciding to, according to Crawford, "press ahead" with wedding to Brown. Murphy has constantly denied an affair with Houston and stated in 2019 "I was never dating Whitney Houston. She was a friend of mine. I may have gone to dinner with her a few times, but it was never like we were dating — we were never boyfriend and girlfriend."

== Alleged fling with Michael Jackson ==
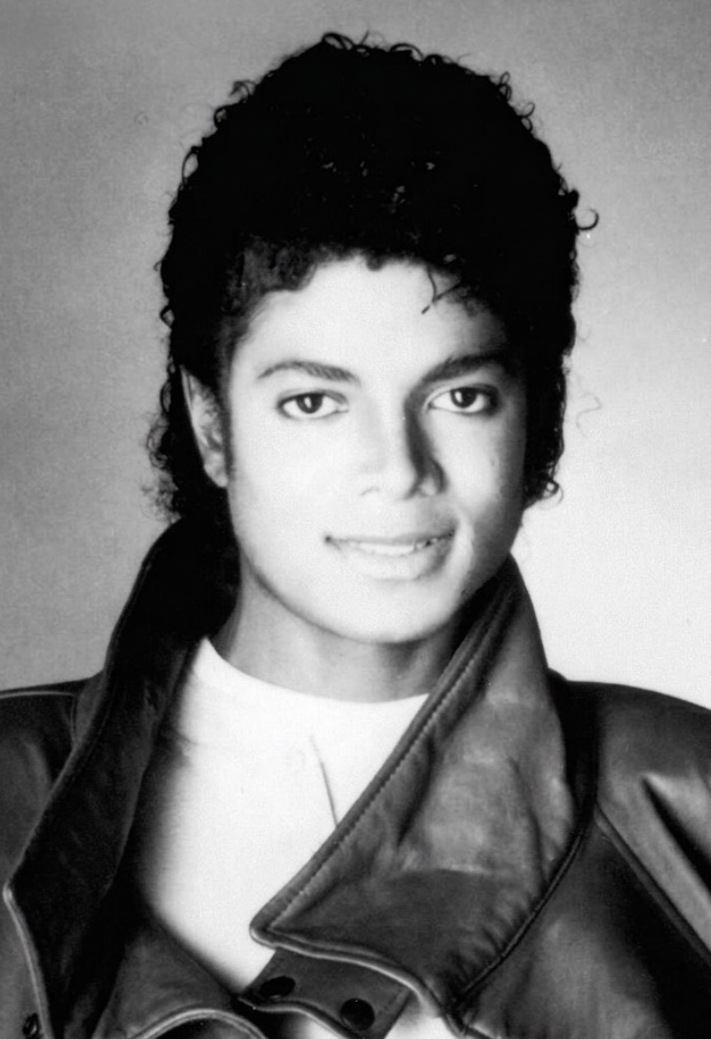
Houston reportedly was romantically involved with fellow pop megastar Michael Jackson.

Houston also shared a close friendship with fellow pop superstar Michael Jackson. Houston and Jackson first met backstage prior to the 30th Grammy Awards in 1988 where the two artists were rehearsing to perform on the show. A week after the Grammys, Houston helped to honor Jackson as he accepted the Frederick D. Patterson Award at a UNCF dinner for funding HBCUs. Houston later visited Jackson's Neverland Ranch in 1989 where she was there to present Jackson with several trophies from the World Music Video Awards. In 1990, Houston took a break from her Japanese tour to sing "Greatest Love of All" to Jackson at the American Cinema Awards; "Greatest Love of All" was reportedly Jackson's favorite song of Houston's.

Jackson's British bodyguard Matt Fiddes later claimed to the tabloid magazine, The Sun, that the two singers began a brief romantic affair in 1991. Said Fiddes: "They met because they were two of the biggest recording artists on the planet and mixing in the same circles. They instantly connected as kindred spirits because they understood each other’s massive fame." Fiddes claimed Houston "practically moved in" to the ranch, claiming it lasted just two weeks. Fiddes claimed Jackson wished it "would have went further" and that the singer "never got over his love for Houston" and even dreamed of marrying the singer. Bobby Brown later claimed in his memoirs that Jackson called him on the phone after Brown and Houston married, telling Brown that he should've been the one to marry Houston and that Brown "beat him to it".

According to others, Houston and Jackson shared a "special kinship" with one another as both artists became worldwide megastars. According to Soraya Nadia McDonald of Andscape, the kinship "went far deeper than your usual show business fare, in which a couple of Big Names have a conversation over one drink at a party and suddenly and conveniently they’re best friends. No, Whitney and Michael shared a similar, familiar, specific isolation — one that allowed the two of them to visit with each other and simply sit in silent communion, each wordlessly in tune with what the other was experiencing.

McDonald continued, "the two biggest black pop stars of the ’80s were each in possession of generation-defining voices that carried far beyond the time limits typically expected of such acts. They could be charming scene-stealers, the type who just naturally drew a spotlight regardless of whether they meant to. But together, in casual privacy, they were just two people aware of what they’d relinquished to become mononyms, to float above the country that birthed them, a couple of Icaruses doomed by their parents’ hubris and their country’s hatred."

== Marriage to Bobby Brown ==
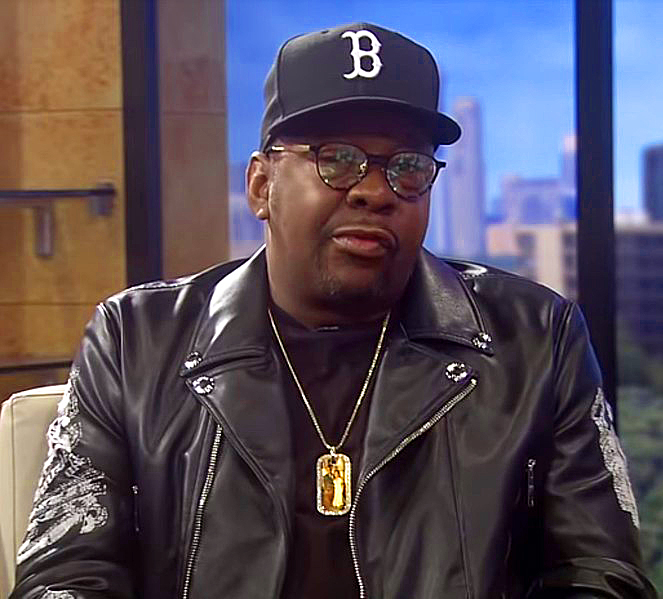
Bobby Brown in 2018

Houston first met American singer Bobby Brown at the 3rd Annual Soul Train Music Awards on April 13, 1989. The two became friends after Houston invited Brown to her 26th birthday party that August. While Eddie Murphy also attended the party, Murphy reportedly left after just thirty minutes while Brown, 20, stayed during the entire duration of the party; cameras later spotted the two together. Their friendship grew gradually after Brown offered to take Houston out on a date following a party held in Houston's friend CeCe Winans's honor in December 1989. Brown and Houston's first date involved seeing the movie, Uncle Buck, and having dinner at the Ivy and then "just chilled" for the rest of that evening. Houston reportedly had been "under a fog" during the Murphy affair but after she first began getting acquainted with Brown, Houston walked in the studio with Narada Michael Walden to record "All the Man That I Need" and said Houston was no longer under that fog, crediting it to Brown's presence. By 1990, the relationship turned serious. As Houston later explained to Rolling Stone, "Our whole relationship started out as friends. We'd have dinner, laugh, talk and go home. It wasn't intimate. And then it kind of dawned on us, 'What's going on here?'."

Around late 1990, Brown first proposed to Houston but the singer turned him down, saying she wasn't ready. In 1992, Houston explained to Vanity Fair, "I just never wanted to be married. I had an independence that didn't include marriage. I always thought men were full of shit. For the most part, they used to talk shit to me all the time." A year later, in 1991, however, as Brown courted Houston throughout her 1991 world tour, Houston changed her mind as she admittedly fell in love with Brown during this period and once Brown asked again for her hand in marriage, the singer accepted.

The singers married on July 18, 1992 and held a star-studded wedding of 800 guests at Houston's Mendham residence. The wedding was presided by Marvin Winans of the Winans gospel family group. Lynn Norment documented the wedding on the September 1992 issue of Ebony magazine with the headline "The Wedding of the Decade".

The couple's relationship and marriage produced speculation that they both married out of convenience for their careers and, in the case of Houston, hiding the truth about her sexuality. Both singers defended their marriage to the press and later released the hit duet, "Something in Common" to combat the media scrutiny against their relationship and marriage. In March 1993, Houston gave birth to their only child together, Bobbi Kristina Brown. The marriage was reportedly volatile, with Brown having several run-ins with the law for drunken driving, drug possession and battery, including some jail time. In October 1995, Entertainment Weekly reported that the 32-year-old Houston had separated from Brown with the singer's publicist admitting the couple were having marital problems and were "working it out in private". They reconciled by the end of the year during the premiere of Houston's film, Waiting to Exhale. Houston's recording of "Why Does It Hurt So Bad" from the soundtrack was reportedly inspired by their troubling marriage. (Note: "Why Does It Hurt So Bad" was originally offered to Houston in 1991 early in their relationship but Houston turned it down at the time due to not being able to relate to the song's lyrics.) In July 1997, Brown was accused of striking Houston in the face after pictures resurfaced of Houston in Capri with a bandage over her cheek covering a two-inch cut requiring she received two stitches; the couple denied the reports at the time with Houston claiming she injured her face while stumbling on a rock while Brown steadfastly denied reports he ever hit Houston. Houston's Grammy-winning 1999 hit, "It's Not Right but It's Okay" was reportedly aimed at Brown due to the song's theme of infidelity though Houston denied it.

In December 2003, Brown reportedly struck Houston during an argument at their home in Alpharetta, Georgia after threatening bodily harm against her; he subsequently left the premises, and Houston reported the incident to the authorities.

Initially, in 2004, Brown denied hitting Houston and even claiming she was the instigator in that fight, claiming, "She hit me. She threw something at me. It escalated." However, in 2016, Brown admitted striking Houston that night but claimed it was an accident after trying to get a drug dealer out of the residence. Said Brown: "I turned around to her, drew back my hand and smacked her across the face. The moment it happened, I was stunned and full of regret." In March 2004, Brown was sentenced to 60 days in jail for violating probation, with his attack on Houston being included. Brown was initially charged with a misdemeanor battery charge though Houston had refused to charge her husband.

The marriage further deteriorated in 2005, the same year their reality TV series, Being Bobby Brown, aired on Bravo. Said Brown: "The last few years of our marriage, it was terrible. Both of us trying to be clean, or one of us trying to be clean." Said Houston in 2009, "I remember saying to God one day, I said, 'Give me one day of strength.' Because I was weak. I was so weak to the love, because he was my drug." Being Bobby Brown drew criticism for what critics perceived to be unflattering moments from the couple, but still achieved high ratings. However, the show was not renewed for a second season after Houston declined further participation. When asked why did she participate in Being Bobby Brown, Houston explained to Oprah Winfrey, "I just wanted people to know that I was his wife. I knew I was trying to be Mrs. Bobby Brown. ... I was trying to make a statement. Like, '[The press isn't] gonna win. You're not going to do that. We got married. We were in love. We were crazy for each other.' … We fought for that. And then somehow it got really kind of messy and got lost," adding she "wasn't happy with the marriage. I was losing me." Brown said in 2012, "We looked at the bubble and saw ourselves. We [were] able to see that our drug use had affected our relationship, had affected the love that we felt for each other."

Brown was also reportedly promiscuous throughout the marriage and had been accused of cheating on Houston with various women. During the early years of the marriage, Houston denied Brown was unfaithful to her, but in her 2009 interview with Oprah Winfrey, she admitted she knew of Brown's infidelity, stating, "I just knew. I was like, 'You don't smell right. You don't look right. Something's going on'. And then all this other stuff started coming out about him being with this one or that one or being too promiscuous." In January 2006, rumors circulated that Houston had separated from Brown; he denied it, saying "The rumors are wrong. They're false. She's the better half of me. … We're loving life, and we're just trying to be as good to each other as possible." That night, Brown performed a show in New Haven, Connecticut at which Houston was a no-show. Brown claimed she missed her flight because "she had a dental appointment. [...] I will dedicate this show to her." Houston confirmed she had left Brown that year and moved to Los Angeles. Sources claimed Brown's affair with Karrine Steffans was "the final straw".

In September 2006, Houston's publicist announced that she had filed for legal separation from Brown. A month later, Houston upgraded the filing to divorce, seeking full custody of their then 13-year-old daughter Bobbi Kristina, with visitation rights for Brown. The divorce was granted on April 24, 2007. Houston confirmed that she had Brown sign a prenuptial agreement the day prior to marrying him in 1992.

Following the end of their marriage, author Derrick Handspike planned to release an unauthorized biography on Brown titled Bobby Brown: The Truth, The Whole Truth and Nothing But... in which Brown was interviewed for a potential autobiography. But after chapters where Brown talked about his marriage to Houston was leaked to the press, Brown backed out of the book. In the book, Brown alleged that Houston married him to keep the rumors of her bisexuality quiet. Brown later sued Handspike and The National Enquirer after the book claimed the former couple had rekindled their romance and had plans to remarry.

== Speculation of Houston's sexuality ==
Despite her marriage and previous affairs with men, Houston never escaped the rumors of her sexuality. In 1996, Houston told Katie Couric despite her friendship with Crawford that she was "a wife, a mother and a daughter. Lesbian and gay I'm not, two titles I can't claim, I'm sorry." In 2000, while interviewed for the LGBTQ publication, Out, Houston said, "If I was gay, I would be proud to tell you ’cause I ain’t that kind of girl to say, 'Naw, that ain’t me.' The thing that hurt me most was that they tried to pin something on me that I was not. My mother raised me to never, ever, be ashamed of what I am. But I’m not a lesbian, darling, I'm not."

In his book, God’s Other Children: A London Memoir, black British gay rights activist Vernal W. Scott credited Crawford for the role she played in arranging Houston’s attendance, as a surprise speaker, at a 1991 AIDS rally that he organized in London, just as Houston was touring the UK. Scott later sent a thank you note to Houston. He dispatched a separate copy to Crawford whom, he writes, he admired as "the wind beneath [Houston's] wings."

“I reflected upon my meeting with Robyn and Whitney, and especially the chemistry of love that was clearly there between the two women,” Scott writes. “I said that [Whitney’s] sexuality was nobody’s business […] but that I had a need to let her know that there was nothing to be ashamed of.”

At the same AIDS event, Houston and Crawford met another LGBTQ+ activist Peter Tatchell. Following Houston's death, Tatchell wrote: "Whitney Houston RIP. She was happiest and at her peak in the 1980s, when she was with her female partner. They were so loved up and joyful together. It’s important to tell the truth about this aspect of her life. Colluding with the cover-up of her same-sex relationship is not right." Like Scott, Tatchell praised Houston for speaking up about the HIV/AIDS crisis "at a time when many other stars kept their distance." He also claimed she was "pressured" to marry Bobby Brown and suggested her "inability to accept and express her same-sex love contributed to her substance abuse and decline".

Comedian Rosie O'Donnell first encountered Houston and Robyn Crawford at a party in the 1990s and claimed it was "understood [Crawford] was Houston's girlfriend." In 2021, O'Donnell told Jess Rothschild on the podcast Hot Takes & Deep Dives: "Whitney was troubled by, I think, the gay part of her life and didn’t want it exposed. I think that there was a lot of conflict about that."

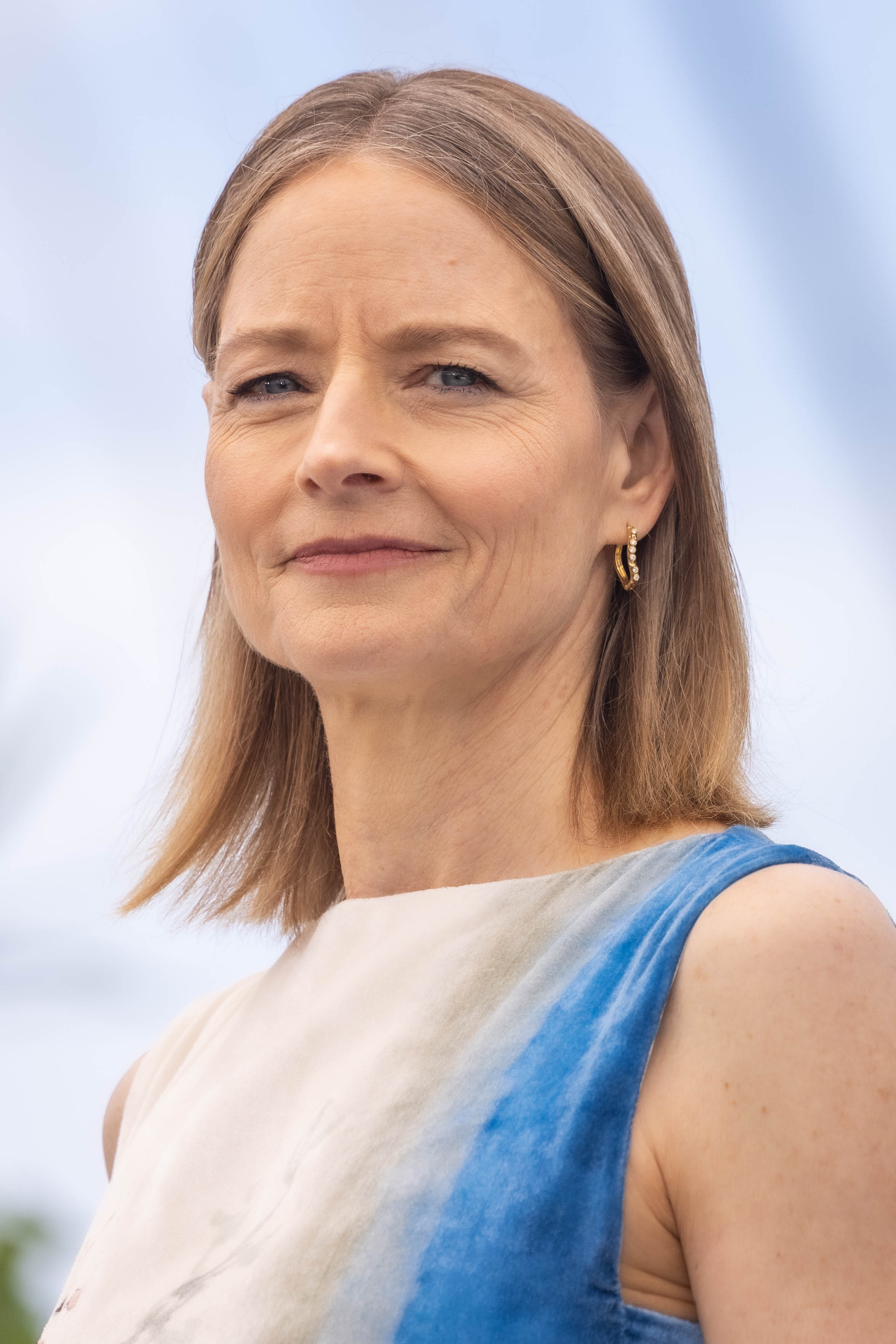
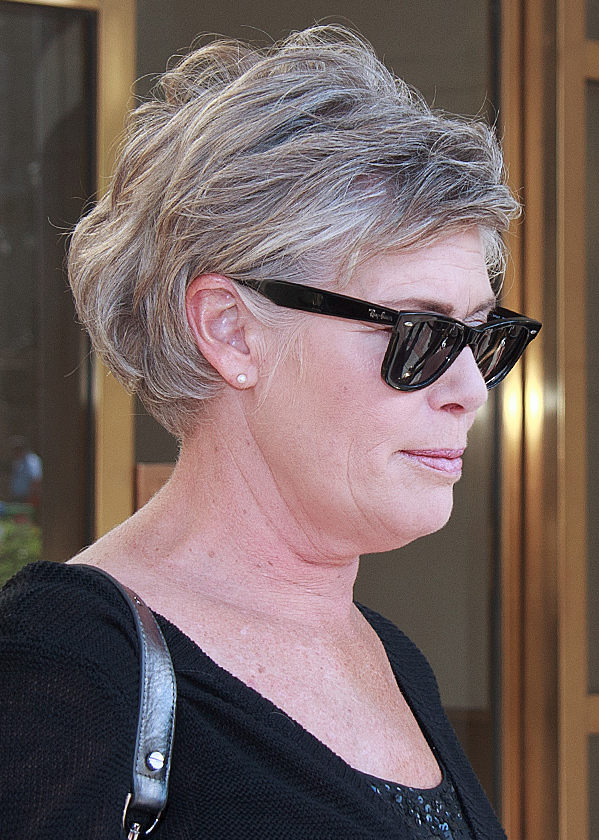
In the late 1980s, tabloids claimed Houston was involved in a love triangle with Jodie Foster (left) and Kelly McGillis (right). While Foster and Houston didn't address the claim, McGillis denied this rumor.

Robyn Crawford told Chris Azzopardi of Pride Source that despite Houston's denials of being lesbian that it didn't come from internalized homophobia stating: "There was nothing partial about Whitney in her thoughts of people; she just resented folks trying to put her in a box with categories. She pushed back on that with music. She hated that. She was the type of person that loved people for who they were, she had no problem. We had lots of gay people around us, whether it be makeup, hair people, you name it. They were beautiful people, and they were close to us."

Though Crawford admitted in her book that some of Houston's answers involving her sexuality bothered her, she didn't believe that she was "internalizing or projecting" homophobia herself; only that she had grown tired of answering the question.

She continued: "[Houston] was asked that question from the beginning of her career. I mean, that rumor followed her forever. And she rejected it. She rejected all labels. Even calling her a "diva" and the way she felt about her colleagues, the female so-called rivals. Every single last one of them, including Mariah, will tell you that Whitney treated them with the utmost respect and love and admiration. They will tell you."

In 2013, Oprah Winfrey asked Houston's mother Cissy if it would've bothered her if her daughter was gay, Cissy admitted it would have. Six years later, however, in 2019, Cissy told queer pastor Bishop Joseph Tolton of LGBT people accepting themselves and being kind, "God wants us to love one another", indicating a change of her opinion from her interview with Winfrey.

One of the members of Cissy's group, the Sweet Inspirations, Estelle Brown, was also gay, and she and Houston befriended singer Luther Vandross, who was homosexual and mostly kept his sexuality private.

Houston's mother herself had a loyal gay following and Houston recalled in 2000 how gay men in her mother's audience at the Manhattan cabaret clubs she headlined during the late 1970s and early 1980s catered to her:

"My mother's best, most beautiful, brightest audience was gay men. We used to work at Reno Sweeney [a trendsetting, '70s Manhattan cabaret]. My mother used to pack that club out. I mean, the queens would be around the corner! Around the corner in a line, waiting to see Miss Cissy. I watched the way my mother dealt with gay people. They could tell her anything and she wouldn't trip. She'd be like [adopting a sassy, worldly voice] 'If so-and-so don't treat you right, fuck 'em. Leave 'em and move on to the next thang.' It was about relationships and loving each other. My mother was an inspiring singer. She sang from her heart about love, the tragedies, the ups, downs, the all-arounds of love, and she somehow made you feel like you'd come out triumphant, no matter what. This had a strong hold for gay people. She'd come out in her slippers and sing. They'd love that. 'Sing, Miss Cissy!' She was real."

Gerrick Kennedy, author of Didn't We Almost Have It All: In Defense of Whitney Houston, believed Houston wouldn't have publicly come out due to the fact that she was brought up in a family full of gospel singers and gospel-influenced artists.

Houston's cousin Dee Dee Warwick reportedly struggled with her career as an openly lesbian artist. Because of this, according to Harriet Alexander of The Telegraph, the struggle with coming to terms with their sexualities "brought [Warwick] closer to Houston". Said a family insider: "Whitney felt closer to Dee Dee by virtue of them sharing a similar orientation. It is interesting that there is that connection between them."

Sometime in the late 1980s, tabloids began printing claims that Houston was in a love triangle between actresses Jodie Foster and Kelly McGillis. At one point, the story went, in 1988, Houston reportedly visited the set of The Accused and got into a fight with McGillis over Foster as they were both seeing the actress.

Neither Houston nor Foster, who has had female partners in the past and is currently married to a woman, ever addressed the rumors but McGillis, who came out as lesbian in 2009, addressed the claims that same year, dismissing them and claiming she had never even met Houston.

In one tabloid article, Houston's sister-in-law Tina Brown claimed to have seen the singer with a female partner at her and brother Bobby Brown's house, claiming she saw Houston and the unnamed woman "without shirts" when she walked in and claimed Houston had a "series of steamy same-sex affairs". Both Tina Brown and former bodyguard Kevin Ammons told the British tabloid newspaper, the Daily Mail, that Houston had "wild sex sessions" with women while high on drugs.

Reverend Irene Monroe of LGBTQ Nation claims: "The freest Houston may have been expressing her sexuality without being drugged out of her mind might have been in 1999 at the 13th Annual New York City Lesbian and Gay Pride Dance. Houston that year flew in for a special surprise guest appearance where she performed her then two most recent hits, 'It's Not Right, But It's Okay' and 'Heartbreak Hotel'."

In 2017, her former hair stylist Ellen LaVar claimed Houston was bisexual and said of Crawford: "Robyn provided a safe place for her… in that Whitney found safety and solace."

A year later, her friend and former musical director Rickey Minor claimed that if Houston was still alive, she would've probably identified as "sexually fluid".

Houston's ex-husband Bobby Brown claimed she was bisexual and felt if Crawford was still in the singer's life and not pushed out by the singer's family that Houston would still be alive.

Stating her bisexuality was an "open secret", Brown continued: "They couldn’t let Whitney live the life she wanted to live; they insisted that she be perfect, that she be someone she wasn’t. That’s why they wanted Robyn out."

Director Kevin Macdonald stated Houston's sexuality was hard to categorize since the singer didn't fit in a single category of sexual orientation stating "At the time, there were all these rumors, 'Whitney's gay, Whitney's gay.' I don't think Whitney saw herself as gay. I think she saw herself as someone who loved who she loved. She's fluid; she had a relationship with a woman, she had a relationship with a man. It's the kind of thing that today would be unremarkable, but back then it was remarkable and people wanted to put her into a box which she didn't really fit."

Crawford, who identifies as queer and admitted to romantic relationships with men herself in the past and is currently married to a woman, wrote in her book about their early 1980s romance: "We never talked about labels, like lesbian or gay. We just lived our lives and I hoped it could go on that way forever."

Kasi Lemmons, director of the Houston biopic, Whitney Houston: I Wanna Dance with Somebody, stated that Houston's bisexuality was "an open secret", stating: "There was lots of speculation. For instance, when I met Whitney, Robyn was upstairs in the hotel suite, with her daughter Bobbi Kristina. It was a very significant relationship in her life, a very significant friendship. I think nowadays we would probably just say, 'Well, she's sexually fluid.' We wouldn't necessarily label it as it having to be one thing or another. She certainly was sexually fluid."

Following Crawford's revelations of their same-sex affair, Myles Johnson of the LGBTQ publication, The Advocate claimed that homophobic culture played a big part in Houston's later decline and death, writing "We can now see that Houston simply observed the reality of homophobia and chose a life that wouldn't make the angel that lived in her throat a secret. And there are no healthy choices in a culture of domination and hegemony where one can't be a female superstar and love another woman, but just because the story isn't special doesn't negate it as poignantly tragic.

"More than scandal or headlines, what Robyn Crawford's story -- her song -- should propel American culture to do is look at itself and apologize to not just Whitney Houston, but all of the other queer lives that have had to learn how to cannibalize their spirits just for societal acceptance and a chance at happiness. That is a cost too high, even for a dream."

== Bibliography ==
- Bowman, Jeffrey (1994). Diva: The Totally Unauthorized Biography of Whitney Houston. HarperCollins. ISBN 978-1-52474-284-3.
- Crawford, Robyn (2019). A Song for You: My Life with Whitney Houston. Dutton. ISBN 978-1-52474-284-3.
- Houston, Cissy (2013). Remembering Whitney: My Story of Love, Loss, and the Night the Music Stopped. HarperCollins. ISBN 978-0-06-223839-9.
- Kennedy, Gerrick (2022). Didn't We Almost Have It All: In Defense of Whitney Houston. Abrams. ISBN 978-1-4197-4969-8.
- Parish, James Robert (2003). Whitney Houston: The Unauthorized Biography. Aurum Press. ISBN 1-85410-921-9.
- Walden, Narada Michael (2012). Whitney Houston: The Voice, The Music, The Inspiration. Insight Editions. ISBN 978-1-608-87200-8.
