= For Rent: One Grammy One Gramps =

1982 novel by Ivy Duffy Doherty

- First edition
- Author: Ivy Duffy Doherty
- Illustrator: Marquita Halstead
- Cover artist: Kaaren Kinzer
- Language: English
- Genre: Young Adult
- Publisher: Review and Herald Publishing Association
- Publication date: 1982
- Publication place: United States
- Media type: Print (paperback)
- Pages: 96 pp
- ISBN: 0-8280-0125-1
- OCLC: 9285564
- LC Class: PZ7.D695 Fo 1982

For Rent: One Grammy One Gramps is a young adult fiction novel by Ivy Duffy Doherty, published 1982.

== Plot summary ==
When the Barnes family come across a for a grammy and gramps for rent, the twins and their parents can't believe it, but respond anyway and become involved in a rewarding adventure they couldn't have imagined.
