= Ivy League (disambiguation) =

Ivy League is an NCAA Division I athletic conference formed from eight universities in the northeastern US, and used more broadly to refer to the eight elite institutions that belong to the league.

Ivy League can also refer to:

- The Ivy League (band), a 1960s British pop trio
- Ivy League (clothes), a clothing style
- Ivy League (haircut), a short style of haircut for men
- Ivy League Records, a record label

== See also ==
- Little Ivies
- Ivy (disambiguation)
