= The Extra Mile (short story collection) =

- First edition
- Author: Ivy R. Doherty
- Illustrator: Jim Padgett (illustrator)
- Language: English
- Publisher: Southern Publishing Association
- Publication date: 1962
- Publication place: United States
- Media type: Print (Hardcover)
- Pages: 175 pp

The Extra Mile is a 1962 book of selected short stories by Ivy R. Doherty.
