= Ève =

Ève is a French given name, the counterpart to the English name Eve and the Latinate Eva. Notable people with this name include:

- Ève Angeli, French musician
- Ève Bazaiba, a member of the Movement of the Liberation of the Congo
- Ève Bélisle, a curler
- Ève de Castro, winner of the Prix des Libraires in 1962
- Ève Curie, a French author
- Ève Demaillot, an 18th century revolutionary
- Ève Francis, assistant to Paul Claudel
- Ève Lavallière, member of the Secular Franciscan Order
- Ève Périsset, a footballer playing for Girondins de Bourdeaux
- Ève Salvail (born 1971), Canadian model

== See also ==
- Eve (disambiguation)
- Marie-Ève
- Sarah-Ève
