= Ivy Duffy Doherty =

Australian-American writer

Ivy R. (Duffy) Doherty
- Born: June 22, 1922; Tea Gardens, New South Wales, Australia
- Died: August 24, 2008 (aged 86); Talent, Oregon, United States
- Occupation: writer
- Writing career
- Pen name: Ivy Duffy Doherty, Ivy R. Doherty, Sylvia Hardwick

Ivy Duffy Doherty (June 22, 1922 – August 24, 2008) was an Australian-American writer best known for her young adult fiction.

== Partial list of works ==
- Susan Haskell, Missionary (1958) ASIN B0007EIZ4W
- The Extra Mile (book) (1962) ASIN B0012S7P02
- My Need for a Magic Carpet (1962) ASIN B000OV6S74
- Singing Tree and Laughing Water (1970) ASIN B0006C2P71
- Prisoner in the Beech Tree (1972) ASIN B0006C4DSM
- Here I Am, Em B! (1981) ISBN 0-8280-0028-X
- For Rent One Grammy One Gramps (1982) ISBN 0-8280-0125-1
- Rainbows of Promise (1983) ISBN 0-8280-0213-4
