= Ivie =

Ivie is a given name and surname. Notable people with the name include:

== Given name ==
- Ivie Anderson (1904–1949), American jazz singer
- Ivie Okujaye (born 1987), Nigerian actress and television producer
- Ivie Richardson (1895–1960), South African tennis player

== Surname ==
- Bryan Ivie (born 1969), American volleyball player
- Joey Ivie (born 1995), American football player
- Larry Ivie (1936–2014), American comics writer and artist
- Mike Ivie (1952–2023), American baseball player
- Thomas Ivie (fl. 1640s), English colonial administrator
- Wilton Ivie (1907–1969), American biologist

== See also ==
- Ivey (name), given name and surname
- Ivy (name), given name and surname
