= James Ivey =

American artist & musician

James Ivey is an artist and musician from Texas residing in San Diego, California. He is known for having a Surreal art style he calls Carnival Surrealism. He is known for having very nonchalant work. He uses all oil-based paints, and usually has very bright work, which may seem unusual, considering the materials.

Growing up in Houston, Texas, Ivey was in numerous punk and hardcore bands including the Charlie Brown Experience and Cactus Flower Daydream. In Houston, Ivey co-founded the dark wave gloom punk band Premonition, which was signed to Siren Records. Premonition released a self-titled album to critical acclaim followed by constant touring.

In the recent past, Ivey has had a recording project using the name "peyote67". The music can be described as cinematic experimental electro-punk utilizing guitars, analog keyboards, found metal objects, contact mics, vintage and new effects.

Currently, Ivey has a recording project called "The Dirty Sun" which can be described as dark wave, industrial, glitch, no wave, electro-punk, lo-fi shoe gaze, which relies heavier on guitars and vintage synthesizers with cold beats all recorded in his own "Dirty Moon Studios" in South Park, San Diego, CA.

== Galleries ==
James Ivey has been featured in many galleries in San Diego, Los Angeles, and New York. Some galleries he has been featured in include (but are not limited to):

- Forseti Gallery
- Infusion Gallery- Collingswood, New Jersey
- Distinction Gallery- Escondido
- San Diego Air & Space Museum
- Agni Zotis Gallery- Manhattan
- Zedism- San Diego
- Cannibal Flower- Los Angeles
- Eclectix Gallery- San Francisco
- APW Gallery- New York City
- Jett Gallery- San Diego
- Luis De Jesus Gallery- San Diego
