= Anna Ivey =

Anna Ivey is a published author and nationally known graduate school admissions counselor at her own firm, Anna Ivey Admissions Counseling.

She is the author of The Ivey Guide to Law School Admissions, published by Harcourt.

In the past, she was Dean of Admissions at University of Chicago Law School. She has been interviewed in The New York Times, The Wall Street Journal, and the Chicago Sun-Times. She has also been a guest on numerous radio stations.

Ivey received her B.A. from Columbia University, and spent her junior year at the University of Cambridge. She received her J.D. from the University of Chicago Law School. in 1997.
