= European Vaccine Initiative =

The European Vaccine Initiative (EVI) is a non-profit Product Development Partnership (PDP) with the goal of supporting and accelerating the development of effective and affordable vaccines for global health. Since its inception in 1998, EVI has operated as an independent non-profit organisation that works closely with academic researchers, the private sector, governments, and other organisations to spearhead vaccine development. Headquartered in Heidelberg, Germany, EVI collaborates with partners across the world to pursue its mission.

== Background ==
The predecessor of EVI, the European Malaria Vaccine Initiative (EMVI) was established in 1998 with the specific aim of accelerating malaria vaccine development in Europe. Initially hosted by the University of Bergen in Norway, EMVI later moved to Copenhagen, Denmark where it was hosted by the Statens Serum Institute (SSI). In 2010, the name of the organisation was changed to EVI to reflect a broader scope of activities. At the same time, the headquarter of the organisation was moved to Heidelberg, Germany and the legal status was changed to a European Economic Interest Grouping (EEIG) with Stockholm University and Heidelberg University as the founding institutions. Although malaria vaccine development remains an important activity for EVI, today EVI is dedicated to support and accelerate the development of effective, accessible, and affordable vaccines for other diseases of importance for global health.

== Organisation and governance ==
EVI is established as an Association (e.V) under German law, with a recognised status as a non-profit organisation. The founding institutions of EVI were Stockholm and Heidelberg Universities, and the current members of the Association are the Biomedical Primate Research Centre, Rijswijk; Heidelberg University, Heidelberg; the Jenner Vaccine Foundation, Oxford; Pasteur Institute, Paris, and the Royal College of Surgeons in Ireland, Dublin. Each of the constituent members is represented on the Board of Directors, which approves policies, organisational strategy and budget. The Chairman of EVI's Board is Dr Clemens Kocken, while EVI has been led since 2020 by Executive Director Ole F. Olesen.

Each constituent member is represented in the General Assembly, which approves policies, organisational strategy and budget. The Chairman of EVI's General Assembly is Dr Clemens Kocken, the vice-chair is Samuel McConkey, while EVI has been led since 2020 by Executive Director Ole F. Olesen.

== Funding ==
EVI's work is funded by donors including Coalition for Epidemic Preparedness Innovations (CEPI), European & Developing Countries Clinical Trials Partnership (EDCTP), European Union (EU), Global Health Innovative Technologies Fund (GHIT), Innovative Medicines Initiative (IMI), Nobelpharma Co., Ltd., World Health Organization - Special Programme for Research and Training in Tropical Diseases (TDR), the Dutch Ministry of Foreign Affairs, the Danish International Development Agency (Danida), the Department of Foreign Affairs (Irish Aid), the Dutch Research Council, the German Federal Ministry of Education and Research (BMBF) through KfW, and the Swedish Ministry of Foreign Affairs, Swedish International Development Cooperation Agency (Sida).

== Research and development activities ==
EVI operates in three complementary areas:

1. Translational vaccine development and early clinical testing: this area is dedicated to supporting and coordinating pre-clinical research, clinical testing and development of individual vaccine candidates, for diseases of poverty and emerging infectious diseases. EVI has supported the development of vaccine candidates for diseases such malaria, zika fever, nipah infection, diarrheal diseases, dengue fever, and leishmaniasis. It has supported the testing and development of 40 different vaccine formulations that have progressed into clinical development.
2. Cross-cutting activities: this area is focused on tackling the gaps in vaccine research and development (R&D) through overarching initiatives such as supporting the implementation of a vaccine R&D infrastructure in Europe, harmonization, knowledge sharing, development and standardisation of assays, development of human challenge models, and capacity building and advocacy.
3. Improving vaccine uptake and knowledge-sharing: dedicated to extending the benefits of vaccines by improving knowledge access and uptake of vaccines. EVI has also engaged in the strengthening of research capacity in low- and middle-income countries, particularly in sub-Saharan Africa.
