= Ivy, Iowa =

- Unincorporated community
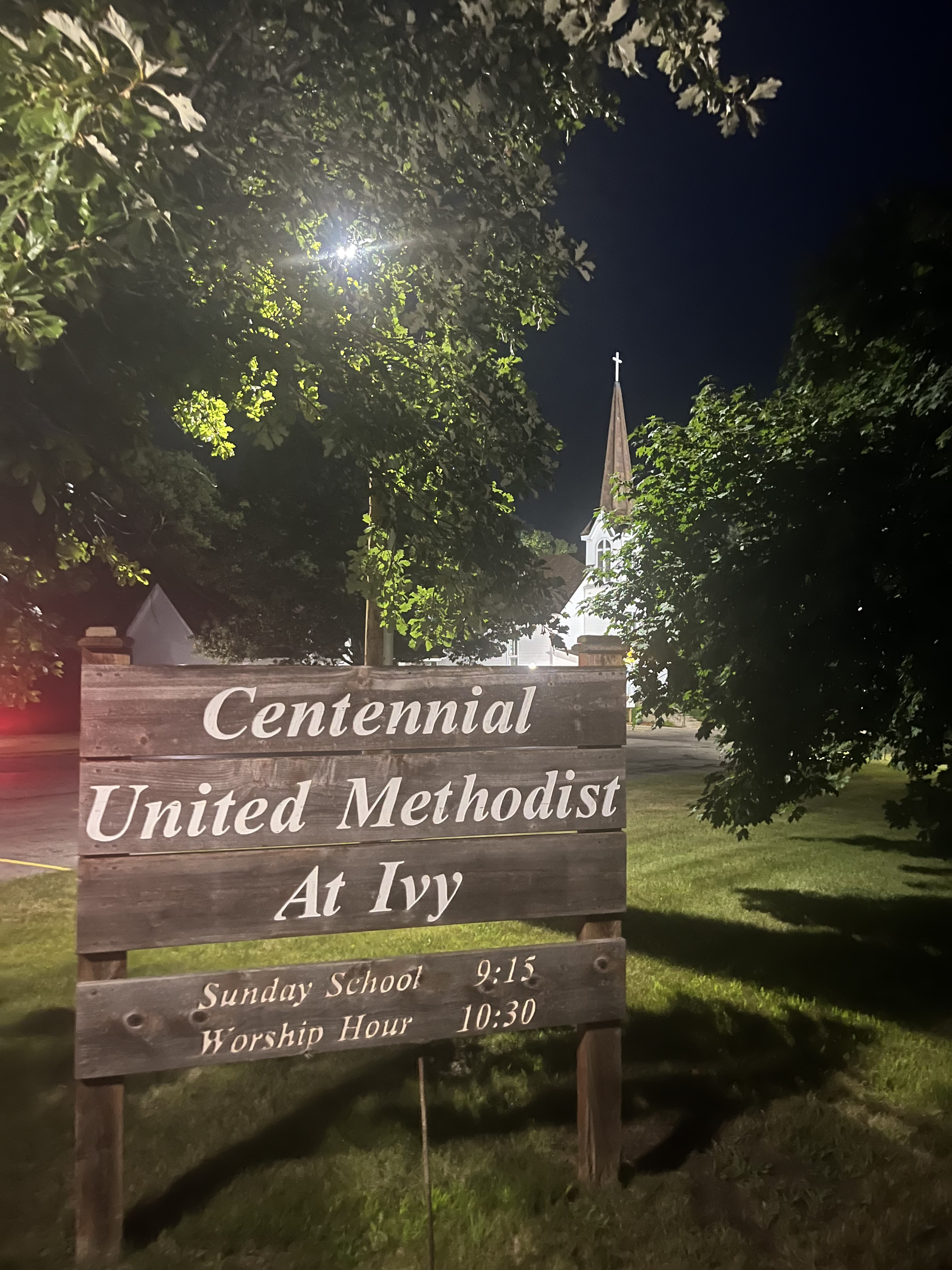
- The Centennial United Methodist Church at Ivy

- Location within Iowa
- Coordinates: 41°36′1.96″N 93°25′1.76″W
- Country: United States
- State: Iowa
- County: Polk
- Townships: Beaver, Camp
- Time zone: UTC-6 (Central (CST))
  - Summer (DST): UTC-5 (CDT)
- Postal code: 50009
- GNIS feature ID: 464592

Ivy is an unincorporated community in Polk County, Iowa, United States.

== History ==
The town formerly had a post office in 1900. The population was 15 in 1940.

As the crow flies, Ivy is approximately 10.8 miles (17.4 km) east of Downtown Des Moines. There used to be a southern part of Ivy, but when Iowa 163 was extended to a two lane highway in the 1960s, the southern part of Ivy was demolished for the extended highway. Iowa 163 curves south of Ivy, instead of going through it, as the older Iowa 163 did.
