= European Venus Explorer =

Proposed European Space Agency space probe to Venus

The European Venus Explorer (EVE), known until 2007 as the Venus Entry Probe (VEP), is a proposed European Space Agency space probe to Venus. In the timeline of the 2005 TRS (technology reference study), the spacecraft was proposed to be launched on a Soyuz-2/Fregat launch vehicle around 2013. However, requests to fund and develop the spacecraft in 2007 and 2010 were rejected.

EVE was a Medium-Class mission proposal in the Cosmic Vision programme. The mission concept consisted of an orbiter and balloon which would circumnavigate the planet over the course of one week, and a lander probe which would operate for approximately one hour on the surface.

== Overview ==
The mission concept calls for two satellites: the Venus Polar Orbiter (VPO), for remote sensing of the atmospheric, and the Venus Elliptical Orbiter (VEO), which deploys the entry probe from a highly elliptical orbit. The entry probe would contain a balloon-aerobot which floats in benign conditions at 55 km altitude in the middle cloud layer, and would drop up to 15 microprobes into the lower atmosphere.
