= Project EVIE =

Defunct U.S. non-profit organization

- Founded: 2009; New York City, United States
- Type: Non-governmental organization
- Purpose: Electric vehicles, carbon footprint
- Location: New York City, United States
- Region served: Worldwide
- Method: Advocacy
- Key people: Jon Azrielant, Executive Director

Project EVIE was a non-profit organization founded in the United States aiming to promote the adoption of electric vehicles. On June 1, 2010, the organization intended to launch the first expedition to drive around the world in a production electric vehicle. The expedition wished to cover 6 continents and 70 countries in 18 months, with a total expected mileage of 70,000 miles. Sufficient funding was not obtained, and the intended expedition did not occur.

== Mission ==
From idealist.org:

Project EVIE was intended to lead the first expedition around the world in a commercially available electric vehicle, taking one big step for a sustainable future and leaving no footprint.

== Expedition route ==
Project EVIE's expedition was intended to begin in New Zealand, continue by boat to Australia, then to Singapore. The expedition team would have crossed Southeast Asia into mainland China, Japan, Nepal and into India. The expedition would have continued into Southern Pakistan, Iran and entered Europe through Turkey. After a loop around Europe, the expedition would have gone through Syria, Lebanon, Jordan and Israel, entering Africa through Egypt. The expedition route was planned to continue across North Africa to Dakar, Senegal and continue by boat to Rio de Janeiro, Brazil.

From Brazil, the expedition would have continued Southwest to the Pan-American Highway and continued North towards Central America.

The expedition would have gone around the Darién Gap by boat from Colombia to Panama and continued to the United States on the Pan-American Highway, ending in New York City.

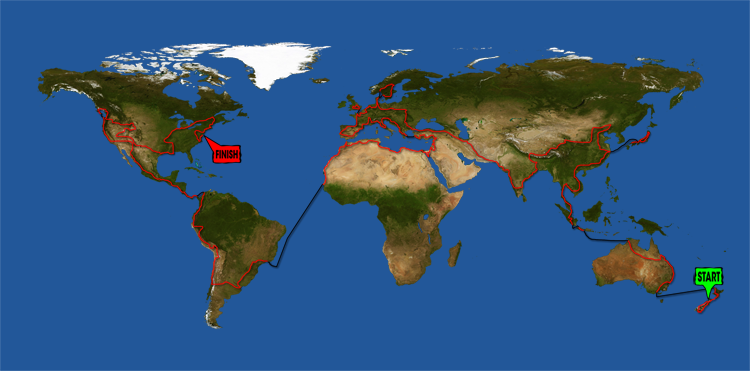

== See also ==
- Electric vehicles
