= Esther V. Yanai =

American conservationist (1928–2003)

Esther Van Der Wart Yanai (May 15, 1928 – October 15, 2003) worked for more than thirty years to preserve open space in Moorestown, New Jersey.

== Background ==
Born in Schenectady, New York, Yanai earned her bachelor's degree from Syracuse University. She earned her master's degree in social work from the University of Minnesota. She was working in Minneapolis as a social worker when she met her future husband, Hideyasu Steve Yanai, a chemist and native of Japan. They were married in 1956 and they moved to Moorestown, New Jersey in 1958.

== Career ==
In the 1960s, Yanai organized a project to study conservation issues for the League of Women Voters. This led, in 1972, to her helping to found, and then later becoming the president of, the citizens' group Save the Environment of Moorestown (STEM). She was on the Moorestown Environmental Advisory Committee and helped in the creation of this organization. She was active with the Pompeston Watershed Association. She also served on the Moorestown planning board for 16 years. Yanai drove the creation of a natural resource inventory (NRI) for the Township, a process that took ten years. In 1988, the NRI was finally adopted as an appendix to the Township Master plan. She was the driving force behind an open space inventory for Moorestown's first Open Space Committee. She worked with local artists to create banners that celebrated every open space. She campaigned for the Green Acres bond issues and worked on many public education events.

== Legacy ==
A 34-acre property near Albury Court on Garwood Road has been named in her honor. It was preserved as a Moorestown Open Space in October 2004. It is primarily wetlands and includes some vernal pools.

== Awards ==
- 2009 Honoree of the National Women's History Month

== Death ==
Yanni died at the age of 75 on October 15, 2003, of cancer. She died at her daughter's home in Syracuse, New York. She is survived by her husband, her daughters, Ruth and Nina, and her granddaughter, Nora.
