= George Ivey =

English footballer

Personal information
- Full name: George Harrison Ivey
- Date of birth: 29 October 1923
- Place of birth: West Stanley, County Durham, England
- Date of death: November 1979 (aged 56)
- Place of death: North Cleveland, County Durham, England
- Height: 5 ft 5 in (1.65 m)
- Position: Winger

Senior career*
| Years | Team | Apps | (Gls) |
- Horden Colliery Welfare
| –1948 | West Stanley | | |
| 1948–1951 | York City | 79 | (13) |
| 1951–1960 | South Shields | | |
| 1960– | Easington Colliery Welfare | | |
| Total | | 79 | (13) |
- * Club domestic league appearances and goals

George Harrison Ivey (29 October 1923 – November 1979) was an English professional footballer who played as a winger in the Football League for York City and in non-League football for Horden Colliery Welfare, West Stanley, South Shields and Easington Colliery Welfare.
