= Yve =

Yve is a masculine or French feminine given name of Germanic origin, which is related to Yvonne and Yves, and may be used as a shortened form of Yvain or Yvette. It is also an uncommon surname. Yve may refer to:

- Yve-Alain Bois (born 1952), French art historian
- Yve Buckland (born 1956), British public servant
- Yve Laris Cohen (born 1985), American artist
- Yve Fehring (born 1973), German TV presenter

== See also ==
- Eve (name)
- Evi (disambiguation)
- Evie (disambiguation)
- Ive (given name)
- Ivey (disambiguation)
- Ivy (disambiguation)
- Yves (given name)
- Yvette
- Yvonne
