= John E. Ivey Jr. =

American educator and sociologist

- Born: January 21, 1919; Raleigh, North Carolina
- Died: May 24, 1992 (aged 73); Raleigh, North Carolina
- Occupation: Educator

John Eli Ivey Jr. (January 21, 1919 – May 24, 1992) was an American educator, a proponent of regional cooperation between colleges and universities, and was best known for innovations in the use of communications technology—specifically television—in education. He was a founder of the Southern Regional Education Board, served on the 1960 panel that recommended to John F. Kennedy the creation of the Peace Corps, and designed the University of South Florida.

Ivey was born in Raleigh, North Carolina, but from age five grew up in Auburn, Alabama, attending Auburn High School and the Alabama Polytechnic Institute, the latter from which he graduated from in 1940 with his B.S. degree. He then studied sociology at the University of North Carolina under Howard Odum, earning his Ph.D. from that institution in 1944. He briefly worked for the Tennessee Valley Authority, before returning to the University of North Carolina in 1947, where at 28 years old he became the youngest full professor in that institution's history.

In 1948 Ivey was called to head the nascent Southern Regional Education Board (SREB), an alliance of 16 Southern states which sought to improve education through regional cooperation. Under Ivey, the SREB created a mechanism for colleges and universities in different states to share facilities and educational programs so that each state would not have to create duplicate programs. At the same time, Ivey resisted attempts by segregationist politicians to turn the SREB into an instrument to circumvent racial desegregation.

In 1957, Ivey left the SREB to become executive vice–president at New York University. After two years at NYU, Ivey left to join the faculty at Michigan State University, where he became dean of the College of Education in 1961. While at Michigan state, he founded the Learning Resources Institute, which promoted the use of multimedia in education, and the Midwest Project on Airborne Television Instruction, which broadcast courses to rural schools via airborne transmitters in the same manner as satellite television would in the future. Ivey remained at Michigan State until 1976, when he retired to Chapel Hill, North Carolina.

In addition to his work in educational technology and regionalism, Ivey served on the panel which made recommendations to John F. Kennedy on the creation of the Peace Corps, was the racial-integration consultant to the United States Commission on Civil Rights, was secretary of the American Council on Education, and chaired the Florida Survey of Higher Education and the Survey of Reorganization of the Atlanta Schools System.

In 1951, Ivey received the Freedom Foundation Medal and five years later he received an Eisenhower Exchange Fellowship. Today, it is known as Eisenhower Fellowships.

== Selected publications ==
- Community Resources (co-author, 1951)
- Education. The Crisis, 1950(November), 628–632.
- Exploring the South (co-author, 1949)
- Building Atlanta's Future (co-author, 1948)
- Education for the Use of Regional Resources (1945)
- Channeling Research into Education (1944)

== Resources ==
- John Ivey Jr., promoted education by electronics. (Obituary) Chicago Tribune, May 31, 1992.
- Barrett, E. Inventory of the Records of John E. Ivey, Jr., 1957-1959. Archives, Library. New York University, 1981.
