= Ivy Kirksey =

American baseball player (born 1902)

- Catcher
- Born: December 18, 1902; Hobson City, Alabama, U.S.

Negro league baseball debut
- 1926, for the Dayton Marcos

Last appearance
- 1926, for the Dayton Marcos
- Stats at Baseball Reference

Teams
- Dayton Marcos (1926)

Ivy Kirksey (December 18, 1902 – death date unknown) was an American Negro league catcher in the 1920s.

A native of Hobson City, Alabama, Kirksey played for the Dayton Marcos in 1926. In 28 recorded games, he posted 13 hits in 80 plate appearances.
