= Gregory Ivy =

American academic

Gregory Ivy (1904–1985) was chairman of the art department at Woman's College, now the University of North Carolina at Greensboro, from 1935 to 1961. He was born on May 7, 1904, in Clarksburg Missouri, to Bennet Monroe Ivy and Fanni B. Dowler.

== Education ==
He attended Tipton High School in Tipton, Missouri, where he graduated in 1922. In 1926, Ivy received a general diploma from the State Teachers College (now Central Missouri State University) in Warrensville, Missouri where he completed his bachelor of science degree from the same college, with majors in art and history and a minor in economics. After graduating in 1928, Ivy taught junior and senior high school art classes in St. Louis, beginning a long career as an artist and a teacher.

In 1931 Ivy received his M.A. from Teachers College at Columbia University in New York. He majored in painting and minored in design. From 1932 to 1935, he taught at the States Teachers College in Indiana, PA (now Indiana University of Pennsylvania) before accepting a position as head of the art department at Woman’s College in Greensboro, NC in 1935, where he was instrumental in founding and developing the art department and establishing The Weatherspoon Art Gallery.

While at Woman’s College, Gregory Ivy helped start the MFA program, which until 1950, was the only art department in North Carolina to have both MFA and BFA degrees. Ivy also introduced the first industrial design class in the United States for college women. He was president of the Southeastern College Art Conference of college art teachers, and appointed director of the Burnsville School of Fine Arts in 1952.

Ivy resigned from Woman’s College in 1961 and he and his wife moved to California in 1965 where he had accepted a position as an art professor and chairman of the art department at California State College at Fullerton. He retired in 1971 and moved to Springfield, Missouri where he died in 1985.

Gregory Ivy's work has been exhibited at the Metropolitan Museum of Art, the Brooklyn Museum, State Art Gallery in Raleigh, the Mint Museum, Art Institute of Chicago, and the Weatherspoon Art Museum.

== See also ==
- University of North Carolina at Greensboro
- California State University, Fullerton
