= Ivy Tan =

Singaporean radio and TV presenter

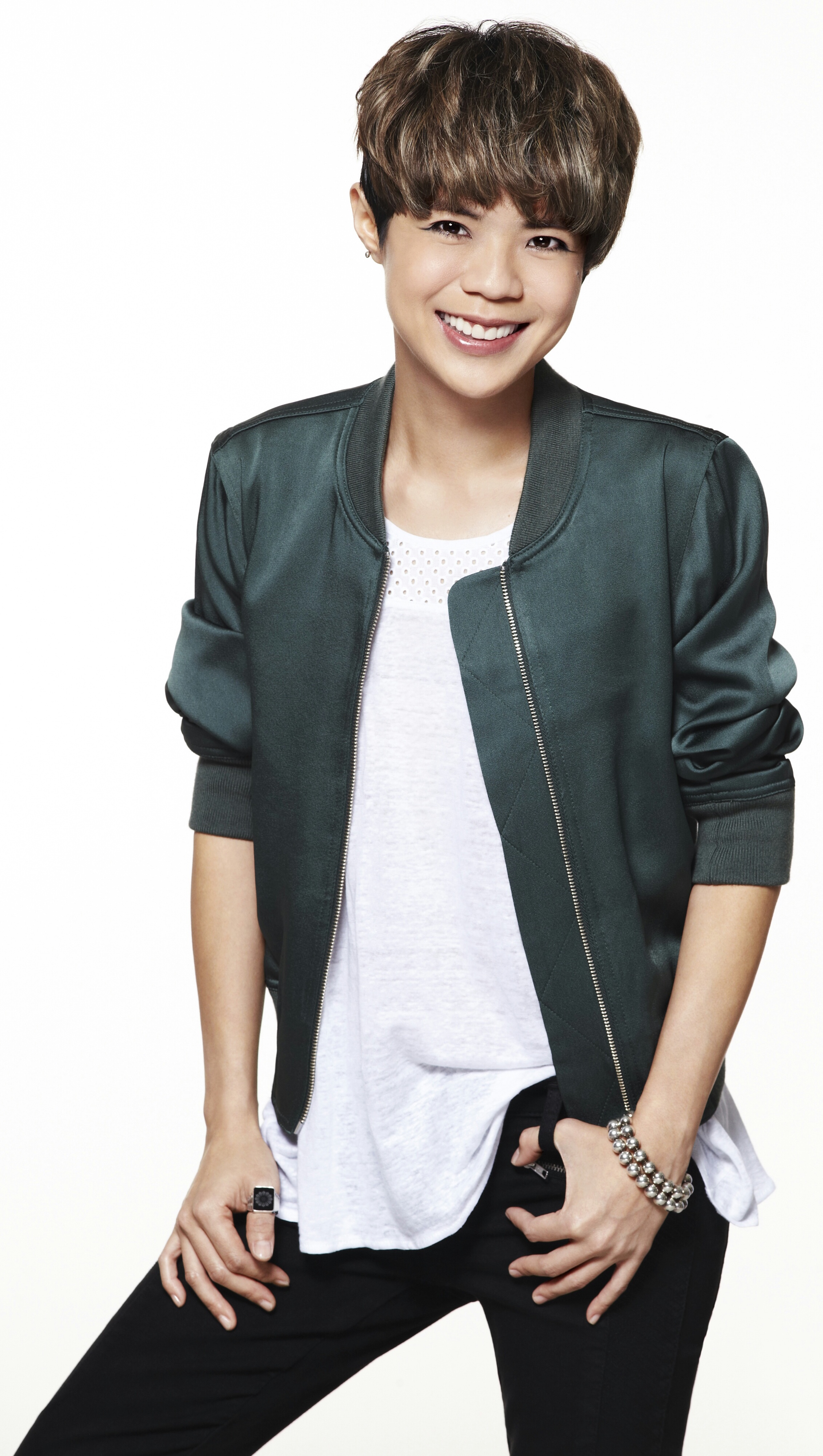
- Ivy Tan in 2014
- Born: Ivy Chen Ai Wei; 16 June; Singapore
- Occupations: Radio deejay, host, emcee, producer
- Years active: 2007-2015

Chinese name
- Simplified Chinese: 陈艾薇
Transcriptions
Standard Mandarin
- Hanyu Pinyin: Chen Ai Wei
- Website: http://www.ivytanaw.com

Ivy Tan, also known as Chen Ai Wei, (Chinese: 陈艾薇) is a Singaporean radio and TV presenter. She worked as a radio DJ for Singapore-based Chinese music station YES 933, which she joined in 2007. Ivy started out her radio career through a talent search organised by the station, which she emerged the champion out of hundreds of hopefuls.

Apart from radio and TV hosting, Tan is also an on-site emcee, producer, voice-over talent and has done quite a few cameos on TV dramas and talk shows.

Tan is bilingual in English and Chinese, and she has expressed interest to pick up a third language, Spanish.

== Early life and education ==
Tan was born in Singapore, to a Malaysian father and Taiwanese mother. She spent the first 6 years of her life shuttling around these countries, and even spent one year living in Wales, England, where her father was doing his master's degree. The family eventually settled in Singapore, where she was educated and raised.

Tan attended Ngee Ann Polytechnic, where she obtained a diploma in Mass Communications. This was the period when she discovered her interest and love for radio. After a few years of working in an advertising firm, she went back to school and achieved her degree in Mass Communications from RMIT University.

== Career ==
Tan started as a freelance emcee for events at the age of 19.

Ivy started her radio career in 2007, when she joined the DJ Search competition organised by YES 933. She emerged the champion out of hundreds of hopefuls and scored a contract with Mediacorp as a Radio Jockey.

Tan is the first full-time DJ the station signed on immediately from a competition.

=== Radio ===
Ivy has hosted a wide range of programs on air. From morning drive time to late night talk shows. She is most remembered for her hilarious "Jaws" series with partner Dennis Chew, and late night talk show "Utopia".

Year	Program Title	
2014 - 2015	Afternoons with Ivy	轻松下半场
2014 - 2015	Travel Whiz	大眼看世界
2010 - 2015	Movie Bites	爆米花
2014 - 2014	Noonie Tunes	薇笑喝茶
2013 - 2014	Utopia	乌托帮
2010 - 2014	Japanese Korean Pop Chart Show	哈本营
2012 - 2013	Morning Fanatics	就是万人迷
2011 - 2012	Midnight Delight	午夜吐女郎
2010 - 2011	Suntan Jaws	Suntan 大白鲨
2010 - 2011	High Tea with Jaws	大白鲨喝下午茶
2009 - 2010	Double Jaws	两只大白鲨
2008 - 2010	Gadget Whiz	科技小玩家
2008 - 2010	Especially For You	弦歌寄意
2007 - 2008	Morning Fanatics	就是万人迷
2007 - 2008	Star DJ All-4-One	明星 DJ All-4-One
2008 - 2009	Bilingual Party	双语 Party
2009–present	Way Too Fun	薇2芬

=== TV ===
Ivy has hosted a wide variety of programs on-screen. She is often the "go-to girl" for backstage/behind-the-scenes because of her quick wit and funny personality.

Program Title		
The Dreams Maker	志在四方 2	Acting
Sealed With A Kiss	吻我吧，住家男	Acting
Face Off	这样是怎样	Guest Star
SPD Charity Show 2015 Press Conference	真情无障碍 2015	Host
Life Is Beautiful	初一的心愿	Host
Smart @ Work	上班不留白	Guest Star
Star Awards 2014 Behind-The-Scenes	红星大奖 2014 幕后花絮	Host
Star Awards 2013 Behind-The-Scenes	红星大奖 2013 幕后花絮	Host
Water Margin	我爱水浒转	Host
Star Search 2010 Webisodes	才华横溢出新秀 2010	Host
Mediacorp Chinese New Year Album	新传媒群星贺岁专辑 2013/2014	Singing
Artistes Web Chats	艺人网络聊天室	Host
Let's Talk	你在囧什么	Guest Star

== Personal life ==
Tan is known to be an avid diver and has traveled around Asia in search of amazing dive sites. She believes strongly in putting a stop to shark finning and is a supporter of Shark Savers campaign "I'm finished with fins".
