= Eve (Jim Capaldi song) =

"Eve" is the debut solo single of Jim Capaldi, released in 1972 from his debut solo album, Oh How We Danced. The song features Paul Kossoff, as well as his former Traffic bandmates Dave Mason and Steve Winwood. The B-side on the Island Records single was another Capaldi-written song, "Going Down Slow All the Way". "Eve" charted at No. 65 in Australia and No. 91 in the US. Capaldi's obituary in The Guardian (2005) mentioned that "Eve", despite being "widely admired", had "mystifyingly failed to give him a hit single" (in the UK).
