= Ive (given name) =

Ive may refer to:

- Ive Ivanov (born 1985), Croatian basketball player
- Ive Jerolimov (born 1958), Croatian football player
- Ive Mažuran (1928–2016), Croatian historian
- Ive Sulentic (born 1959), Canadian soccer player of Croatian descent
- Ive Šubic (1922-–1989), Slovene painter

== See also ==
- Ivo
- Ivan (name)
