= Ève, Oise =

Commune in the Oise department, France

Ève
- Commune
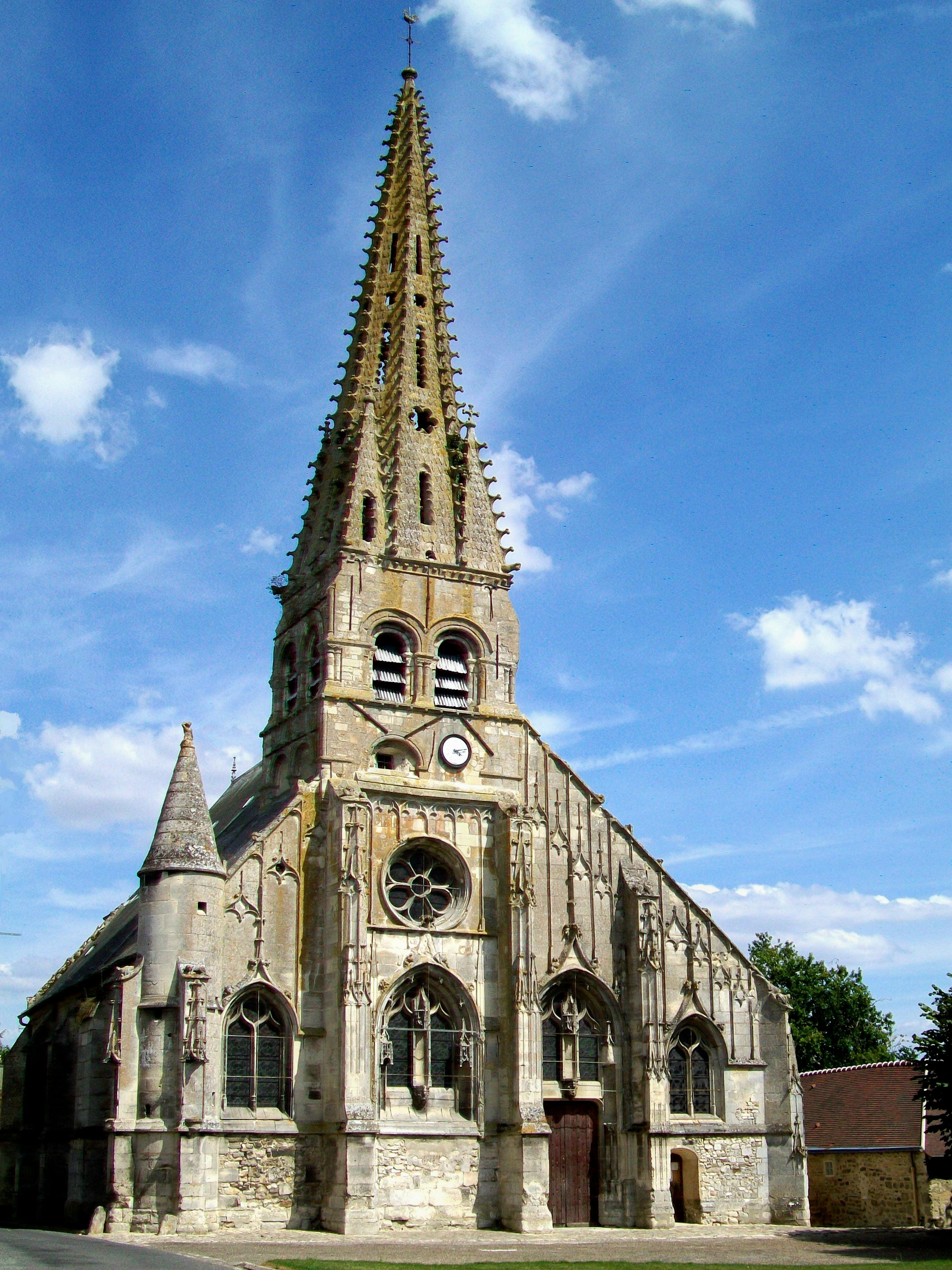
- The church in Ève
- Location of Ève
- Location within France Location within Hauts-de-France
- Coordinates: 49°05′24″N 2°42′18″E
- Country: France
- Region: Hauts-de-France
- Department: Oise
- Arrondissement: Senlis
- Canton: Nanteuil-le-Haudouin
- Intercommunality: Pays de Valoise

Government
  - Mayor (2020–2026): Agnès Champault
- Area^{1}: 10.43 km^{2} (4.03 sq mi)
- Elevation: 96 m (315 ft)
- Highest elevation: 119 m (390 ft)
- Lowest elevation: 87 m (285 ft)
- Population (2023): 411
  - Density: 39.4/km^{2} (102/sq mi)
- Time zone: UTC+01:00 (CET)
  - Summer (DST): UTC+02:00 (CEST)
- INSEE/Postal code: 60226 /60330
- ^{1} French Land Register data, which excludes lakes, ponds, glaciers > 1 km^{2} (0.386 sq mi or 247 acres) and river estuaries.

Ève (French pronunciation: [ɛv]) is a commune in the Oise department in northern France.

== See also ==
- Communes of the Oise department
