= Marie-Ève =

Marie-Ève or Marie-Eve is a French feminine given name. Notable people with the name include:

- Marie-Ève Beauchemin-Nadeau (born 1988), Canadian weightlifter
- Marie-Eve Dicaire (born 1986), Canadian boxer
- Marie-Ève Drolet (born 1996), Canadian short track speed skater
- Marie-Ève Gahié (born 1996), French judoka
- Marie-Ève Janvier (born 1984), Canadian singer
- Marie-Ève Juste, Canadian film director
- Marie-Ève Lacasse (born 1982), Canadian writer
- Marie-Ève Laure, Canadian singer-songwriter
- Marie-Ève Marleau (born 1982), Canadian diver
- Marie-Eve Morin, Canadian philosopher
- Marie-Ève Nault (born 1982), Canadian soccer player
- Marie-Ève Paget (born 1994), French basketball player
- Marie-Ève Pelletier (born 1982), Canadian former tennis player
- Marie-Eve Proulx, Canadian politician

== See also ==
- Ève-Mary
