= Ivy (disambiguation) =

Ivy is the common name of plants in the genus Hedera in the family Araliaceae.

Ivy or IVY may also refer to:

- List of plants known as ivy

== Arts and entertainment ==
=== Film ===
- Ivy (1947 film), an American film noir
- Ivy (2015 film), a Turkish drama
- The Ivy (film), a 2025 drama

=== Music ===
- Ivy (band), an American pop band 1994–2012, 2024-present
- Ivy (Elisa album), 2010
- Ivy (Ivy Quainoo album), 2012
- "Ivy" (song), by Frank Ocean, 2016, and covered by others
- "Ivy", a song by Taylor Swift from the 2020 album Evermore
- "Ivy", a song by Mabel from the 2017 album Ivy to Roses
- "Ivy (Doomsday)", a song by Amity Affliction from the 2018 album Misery

== Businesses ==
- Ivy (motorcycles), a motorcycle manufacturer
- The Ivy (United Kingdom), restaurants in London and elsewhere
- The Ivy (Los Angeles), a restaurant
- FG (restaurant), formerly Ivy, in Rotterdam, Netherlands

== People ==
- Ivy (name), including a list of people and fictional characters with the given name or surname
- Ivy (Chinese singer) (Deng Wanxing, born 1987)
- Ivy (South Korean singer) (Park Eun-hye, born 1982)

== Places ==
- Ivy, Essa, Ontario, Canada
- Ivy, Iowa, U.S.
- Ivy, Virginia, U.S.
- Ivy, West Virginia, U.S.
- Ivy Township, Lyon County, Kansas, U.S.

== Other uses ==
- Apache Ivy, a transitive package manager
- MV Ivy, formerly Empire Gat, a ship
- Ivybridge railway station, Devon, England, station code IVY
- Operation Ivy, two nuclear tests in 1952

== See also ==
- Ivey (disambiguation)
- Ivie, a given name and surname
- Ivy League, an association of prestigious American universities
  - Little Ivies, an unofficial group of liberal arts colleges in the Northeastern U.S.
- Ivy League (disambiguation)
- Ivy Mike, a 1952 test of a thermonuclear device
