= The Ivy (United States) =

Restaurant in Los Angeles

Coordinates: 34.075729°N 118.383849°W

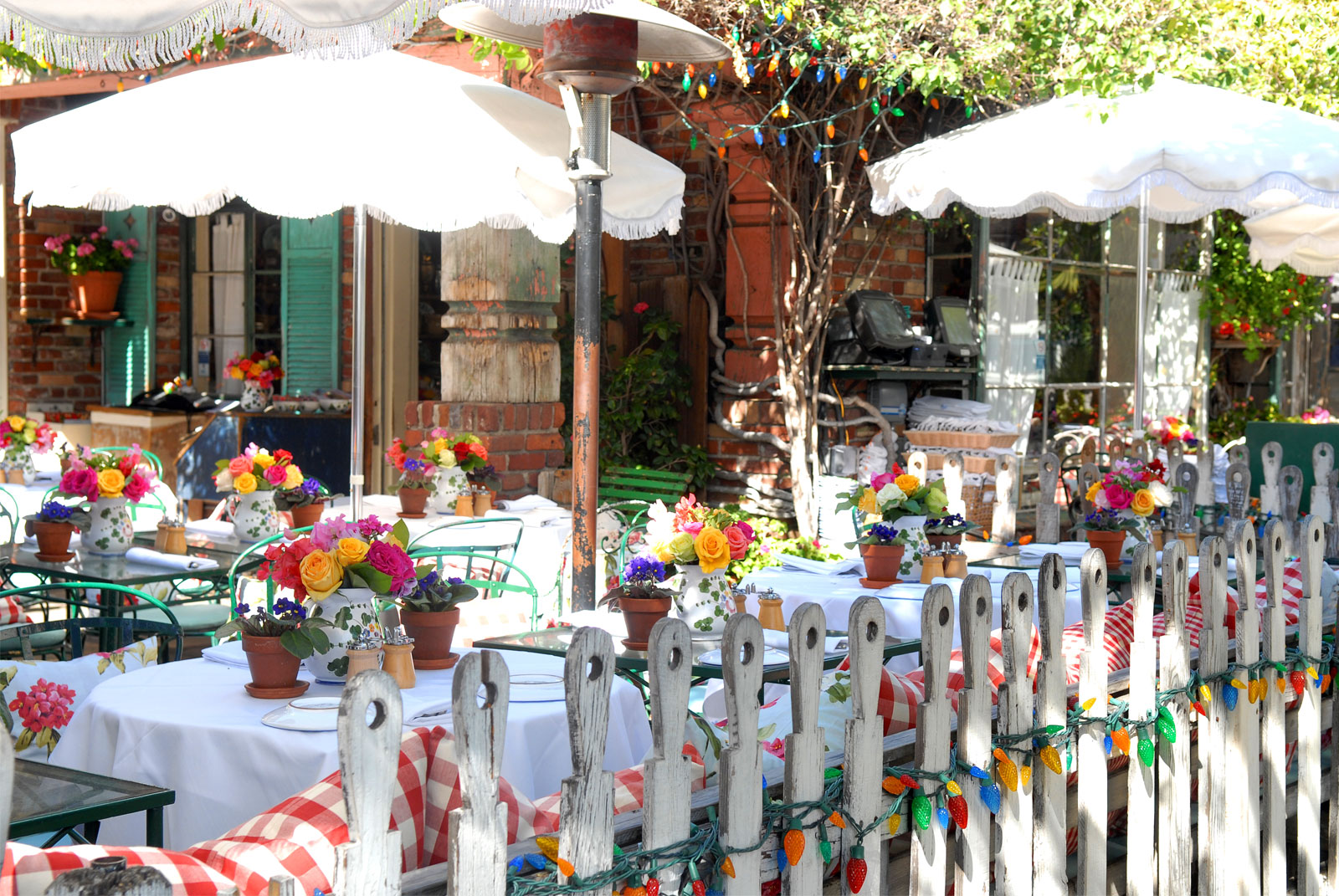
- Interactive map of The Ivy

Restaurant information
- Established: 1977
- Owners: Richard Irving, Lynn von Kersting, and India von Kersting Irving Wolfe
- Head chef: Richard Irving
- Location: United States
- Website: theivy.com

The Ivy is a US-based restaurant group founded and owned by chef Richard Irving and interior designer Lynn von Kersting. The couple runs the restaurants.

The Ivy on Robertson Blvd in Los Angeles opened in 1980, Ivy at the Shore in Santa Monica in 1985.

The Ivy is known for its historic significance to the LA food scene, popularity with celebrities, distinctive interiors and pottery, and its eclectic menu.

In 2027, in Katy Trail (Dallas), plans are for their daughter India Wolfe and her husband Ernest Ervin Wolfe IV, to open a related restaurant.

== The Ivy (Los Angeles) ==
In 1980, following the success of Irving's 1977 bakery, LA Desserts, Irving and von Kersting opened The Ivy on 113 N Robertson Blvd in a 100-year old cottage near the Melrose design district and Beverly Hills. It quickly became a popular spot for celebrities and Hollywood "power brunches."

== Ivy at the Shore (Santa Monica) ==
In 1985, Irving and von Kersting opened Ivy at the Shore at 1535 Ocean Avenue, near the Santa Monica Pier. Ivy at the Shore serves a similar menu to The Ivy in a relaxed, tropical atmosphere with a scenic view of the Pacific Ocean, and features a front patio overlooking the ocean and a large outdoor garden in back. Shortly after its opening, it was acclaimed as 'the restaurant of the year' by Sharon Boorstin of the Los Angeles Herald Examiner.

== The Ivy (Dallas) ==
In 2026 it was announced that The Ivy would be opening its first ever location outside of Los Angeles in Dallas on the Katy Trail at 4205 Buena Vista St. It is to be operated by India Wolfe and Ernest Wolfe IV and retain familiar aspects of The Ivy in Los Angeles in terms of its flower-filled patio, diverse menu, and upscale all-American aesthetic along with its signature pottery.

== Notable patrons ==
The Ivy has a large catalogue of paparazzi photos from celebrities over the decades, including every living US President, regulars like Michael Jackson, who once left his iconic black hat at the restaurant, Jennifer Lopez, the Kardashians, and many more. Lil' Kim and her "raucous entourage", "kept the sidecars flowing till closing at the tony Robertson Boulevard restaurant" while she was in Los Angeles working on her third solo album, according to a 2002 Los Angeles Times story. Paris Hilton's brother Barron held a birthday "bash" at The Ivy in 2004.

== In popular culture ==
The restaurant is a location for "brunch on a Tuesday" in the 1992 film The Bodyguard starring Kevin Costner and Whitney Houston.

The restaurant is featured and discussed in many scenes of the 1995 film Get Shorty, where John Travolta, Danny DeVito, and Gene Hackman discuss how stars have to order "off-menu".

The Ivy is used as the site where Michael Vartan proposes to Jennifer Lopez in the 2005 film Monster-in-Law.

It is featured in season 12 of Keeping Up with the Kardashians.

It is featured in season 3 episode 9 and season 7 episode 19 of Entourage.

In 30 Rock season 1 episode "Tracy Does Conan", Tracy Jordan jokes about meeting Sharon Stone in the women's bathroom at The Ivy.
