= Eevee (band) =

Filipino band

- Origin: Davao City, Philippines
- Genres: Pinoy rock
- Years active: 2009–present
- Labels: Sony Music (2010–2012); Dreamers Records (2015–2016); Ivory Music (2017–present)
- Members: Enzo Villegas; Paolo Segura; Gianne Garcia; Patrick Anchinges
- Past members: Jerrick Sy; Craig Neniel; Michael Rei Dantes; Paul Alef Hapita
- Website: Eevee on Facebook

Eevee is a four-piece Filipino band from Davao City. They emerged as champions of the Nescafe 3-in-1 Soundskool in 2009.

== History ==
The band was formed in 2009 as the Enzo Villegas Band. At that time, they joined the Nescafe 3 in 1 Soundskool, where they emerged as champions. As part of the prize, they signed with Sony Music. They relocated to Manila not long after and renamed as Eevee after the Pokémon of the same name.

In June 2010, they released their debut album Paramdam with "Gusto Ko Lang Ng Girlfriend" as the first single. The album was produced by ex-Eraserheads bassist and now The Dawn bassist Buddy Zabala, and Sancho Sanchez. In February 2012, they released their second album Playtime with "Ang Sarap Maging Single" as its single.

In 2017, after releasing an album and EP independently, they signed with Ivory Music. Since then, they released a slew of singles, including "Kargo" and a cover of an April Boy Regino hit "Di Ko Kayang Tanggapin".

== Band members ==
=== Current members ===
- Enzo Villegas (Vocals / Guitars)
- Paolo Segura (Lead Guitar)
- G Garcia (Bass)
- Patrick Anchinges (Drums)

=== Former members ===
- Jerrick Sy (Bass)
- Craig John Neniel (Drums)
- Michael Rei Dantes (Drums)
- Paul Alef Hapita (Bass)

== Discography ==
=== Studio albums ===
Album	Year	Records
Paramdam	2010	Musiko/Sony Music
Playtime	2012	Musiko/Sony Music
Pandemonium (EP)	2015	Dreamers Records
Follow Me	2016	Dreamers Records

== Singles ==
- 2010 - "Gusto Ko Lang Ng Girlfriend"
- 2011 - "Waiter"
- 2011 - "Larawan"
- 2012 - "Ang Sarap Maging Single"
- 2013 - "Redch33ka"
- 2015 - "Stars Collide"
- 2015 - "Search Your Heart"
- 2017 - "Gisingin Mo Na Lang Ako"
- 2018 - "Europa Forever"
- 2018 - "Nakakamiss"
- 2018 - "Di Ko Kayang Tanggapin"
- 2019 - "Alanganin"
- 2019 - "Follow Me 2019"
- 2020 - "Kargo"
- 2020 - "A Dreamer's Retrospective"
- 2021 - "Huwag Lang Ikaw"
