= Eevee =

Pokémon species

- Pokémon character
- Eevee artwork by Ken Sugimori
- First game: Pokémon Red and Blue (1996)
- Created by: Satoshi Tajiri
- Designed by: Motofumi Fujiwara; Ken Sugimori (finalized)
- Voiced by: English: Kayzie Rogers; Erica Schroeder; Suzy Myers; Japanese: Rikako Aikawa; Yumi Tōma; Megumi Hayashibara; Mika Kanai; Chinami Nishimura; Megumi Sato (Super Smash Bros. appearances); Wakana Minami; Risa Shimizu; Kei Shindō; Aoi Yūki (Video games)

In-universe information
- Species: Pokémon
- Type: Normal

Eevee (/ˈiːvi/), known in Japan as Eievui (Japanese: イーブイ, Hepburn: Ībui), is a Pokémon species in the Pokémon franchise. Created by Satoshi Tajiri and designed by Motofumi Fujiwara, it first appeared in the video games Pokémon Red and Blue. It later appeared in a variety of merchandise, spin-off titles, and both animated and printed adaptations of the franchise. It is also the game mascot and starter Pokémon for Pokémon: Let's Go, Eevee!

Known as the "Evolution Pokémon" in the games and the anime, Eevee has an unstable genetic code, which allows it to evolve into one of eight different Pokémon, known as Eeveelutions, depending on the situation. The first three of these evolutions, Vaporeon, Jolteon, and Flareon, were introduced alongside Eevee in Pokémon Red and Blue. Five more evolutions have since been introduced in Pokémon games: Espeon, Umbreon, Leafeon, Glaceon, and Sylveon. Eevee is one of the most popular Pokémon among fans, due to its character design and ability to evolve into many forms with different Pokémon types.

== Conception and characteristics ==
Eevee is a species of fictional creatures called Pokémon created for the Pokémon media franchise. Developed by Game Freak and published by Nintendo, the Japanese franchise began in 1996 with the video games Pokémon Red and Green for the Game Boy, which were later released in North America as Pokémon Red and Blue in 1998. In these games and their sequels, the player assumes the role of a Trainer whose goal is to capture and use the creatures' special abilities to combat other Pokémon. Some Pokémon can transform into stronger species through a process called evolution via various means, such as exposure to specific items. Each Pokémon has one or two elemental types, which define its advantages and disadvantages when battling other Pokémon. A major goal in each game is to complete the Pokédex, a comprehensive Pokémon encyclopedia, by capturing, evolving, and trading with other Trainers to obtain individuals from all Pokémon species.

During the development of the games, series creator Satoshi Tajiri wanted to include a Pokémon that could evolve into multiple different types. The design for Eevee and its initial evolutions, Jolteon and Flareon, were provided by Japanese graphic designer Motofumi Fujiwara, while fellow graphic designer Atsuko Nishida designed Vaporeon. The designs were then finalized by lead designer Ken Sugimori, who did illustrations based on the game sprites created by Fujiwara and Nishida. In the original Japanese games, the Pokémon was called Eievui, a name which has similar prefixes to its current English name. However, before the English versions of the games were released, Eevee was originally going to be named Eon rather than Eevee. It was renamed to "Eevee" shortly before the English releases of Pokémon Red and Blue. Eevee in-game is a Normal type, one of eighteen elemental attributes that determine a Pokémon's strengths and weaknesses.

According to the Pokémon video games, Eevee is a mammalian creature with brown fur, a bushy tail that has a cream-colored tip, and a furry collar that is also cream-colored. Eevee has brown eyes, big ears, and pink paw pads. Eevee is said to have an irregularly shaped genetic structure, enabling it to evolve into multiple Pokémon. Fujiwara stated of Eevee "I wanted to create a blank slate Pokémon". Eevee's design draws upon his vague childhood memories, including an instance where he became lost in a forest and "encountered an undefinable creature," and he likened its appearance to "a fluffy cat or dog-like creature one would see in the country." Eevee has been voiced by Erica Schroeder in English and by Chinami Nishimura in Japanese for the anime series, while Aoi Yūki provided the voice of Eevee in various video games. Yūki voices Eevee in the video games akin to Pokémon in the anime series, which say their own names when talking. Due to Eevee having multiple names across languages, Yūki was instructed to blend together various characteristics of these names in her performance. Eevee originally used a digitized "cry" in past games, with Yūki voicing Eevee in Pokémon: Let's Go, Eevee! and Pokémon: Let's Go, Pikachu! and Pokémon Sword and Shield, with the "cry" from past games in the series being used once more from Pokémon Legends: Arceus onwards. Eevee is based on a creature that Motofumi Fujiwara encountered in his youth but was unable to identify.

=== Evolutions ===
Eevee and its various evolutions

Eevee is best known for being the Pokémon with the most potential evolutions (dubbed "Eeveelutions"), with eight possible evolutionary forms. In the first generation of Pokémon games, where Eevee was introduced, it was also the only species to have branched evolutions. All of the Eeveelutions were designed by Atsuko Nishida, except for Jolteon and Flareon, which were designed by Motofumi Fujiwara. The term "Eeveelution" was originally coined by fans. It was first used in an official capacity as a pun in the official guide for Pokémon Stadium 2 and has since been used as an official designator for the group.

There are a total of eight Eeveelutions, introduced in a variety of games. Vaporeon, a Water-type, Jolteon, an Electric-type, and Flareon, a Fire-type, were introduced in the first installments, Pokémon Red and Blue. Espeon, a Psychic-type, and Umbreon, a Dark-type, were introduced in their sequels, Pokémon Gold and Silver. Glaceon, an Ice-type, and Leafeon, a Grass-type, were introduced in Pokémon Diamond and Pearl, while Sylveon, a Fairy-type, was introduced in Pokémon X and Y. A ninth, Flying-type Eeveelution was planned for the 2016 games Pokémon Sun and Moon, but scrapped due to similarities to a design made by a fan.

== Appearances ==
=== In the video games ===
In the Red, Blue, Yellow versions, the player receives one Eevee in Celadon City. In Pokémon Yellow, the player was to receive an Eevee from Professor Oak at the beginning of the game as the player's starter. However, the player's rival decides to take the Eevee before the player can obtain it. Due to this, the player is forced to choose the wild Pikachu that Professor Oak had caught earlier as a starter. The player's rival meanwhile evolves his Eevee into any of the three evolutions available, depending on the outcomes of the player's encounters with him in the early parts of the game. Eevee went on to reappear in nearly every subsequent installment of the main series.

In Pokémon Sun and Moon, Eevee gained the ability to use a special "Z-Crystal" item known as Eevium Z. This allowed it to use a special "Z-Move," a one time use powerful attack, known as Extreme Evoboost. In Pokémon Sword and Shield, Eevee gained the ability to use a unique "Gigantamax Form," which could be used when Eevee utilized the game's "Dynamax" mechanic, which exponentially increased the Pokémon's size and changed its appearance. The transformation allowed it access to a unique attack known as G-Max Cuddle, which deals damage and infatuates opponents of the opposite gender.

In 2018, remakes of Pokémon Yellow, Pokémon: Let's Go, Eevee! and Pokémon: Let's Go, Pikachu! were released. Unlike in the original Pokémon Yellow game in which Pikachu was the only Pokémon able to walk around with the player outside its Pokéball, in Let's Go, Eevee! the player's partner and starter Pokémon Eevee refuses a Pokéball and stays with the player in the overworld. The partner Eevee is able to wear accessories and clothes and "hairstyles" which are visible in the overworld. Like Pikachu, in Let's Go, Eevee!, the partner Eevee refuses to evolve, but is able to learn special moves not available in other games, with eight possible moves each based on one of Eevee's evolutions. Game developer Junichi Masuda said that Eevee was chosen for the remake because of its popularity in fan art, although Psyduck was also considered before it was decided its coloring was too similar to Pikachu.

Outside of the main series, Eevee has appeared in a variety of spin-offs. In Pokémon Stadium 2, Eevee stars in its own minigame called "Eager Eevee". Players have to run around in circles while Aipom raises and lowers a cover on berries. The object is to be among the first to grab some of the berries. It also appeared in a variety of other games, such as the Pokémon Mystery Dungeon series, Pokémon Conquest, Pokemon Masters EX, Pokémon Go, Pokémon Unite and New Pokémon Snap. It also acts as the first Pokémon available to the player in Conquest, and also does so in Pokémon XD: Gale of Darkness.

=== In other media ===
In the anime, Eevee first appeared in The Battling Eevee Brothers. A little boy named Mikey was hiding the Evolution Pokémon from his three older brothers because they wanted him to evolve it. However, when Mikey's Eevee single-handedly defeated Team Rocket, they were able to accept the fact that Mikey wanted to keep his Eevee just the way it is. Ash's longtime rival Gary Oak uses an Eevee that eventually evolves into Umbreon. The Kimono Girls who first appeared in the Pokémon Gold and Silver games, later make an appearance with their Eeveelutions. The youngest of the Kimono girls had an unevolved Eevee, though it evolved into an Espeon later on in the series. May has an Eevee that hatched from an Egg, which she used in Pokémon Contests all across the Kanto region. When May traveled to Sinnoh, it evolved into Glaceon. In Pokémon the Series: XY, Serena also acquired an Eevee of her own which evolved into a Sylveon. In Pokémon the Series: Sun and Moon, Lana captured a shaggy haired Eevee nicknamed Sandy. Later in the anime, another Eevee owned by the character Chloe Cerize is shown to be incapable of evolving. While the reason is unknown, the other characters theorize it is due to indecisiveness on what to evolve into.

Eevee appears briefly in Detective Pikachu, under the ownership of Howard Clifford. It is forced to evolve into Flareon. In Pokémon Adventures, Red is in possession of an Eevee which had been experimented on by Team Rocket. As a result, it could transform back and forth from the three evolutions Vaporeon, Jolteon, and Flareon along with its base form, allowing it greater tactical ability in fighting other Pokémon. Eventually, it evolved into an Espeon, losing its special ability to interchange abilities. Eevee and its evolutions have appeared in the Pokémon Trading Card Game. It has also appeared in Animal Crossing: Pocket Camp and the Super Smash Bros. series.

In the crowdsourced social experiment Twitch Plays Pokémon, an Eevee was the source of much frustration when, while trying to evolve it into a Vaporeon to learn the move Surf, the players accidentally used a Fire Stone on it, evolving it into a Flareon. This setback led to Flareon being called the "false prophet" and became one of the most famous moments of the event.

== Promotion and reception ==
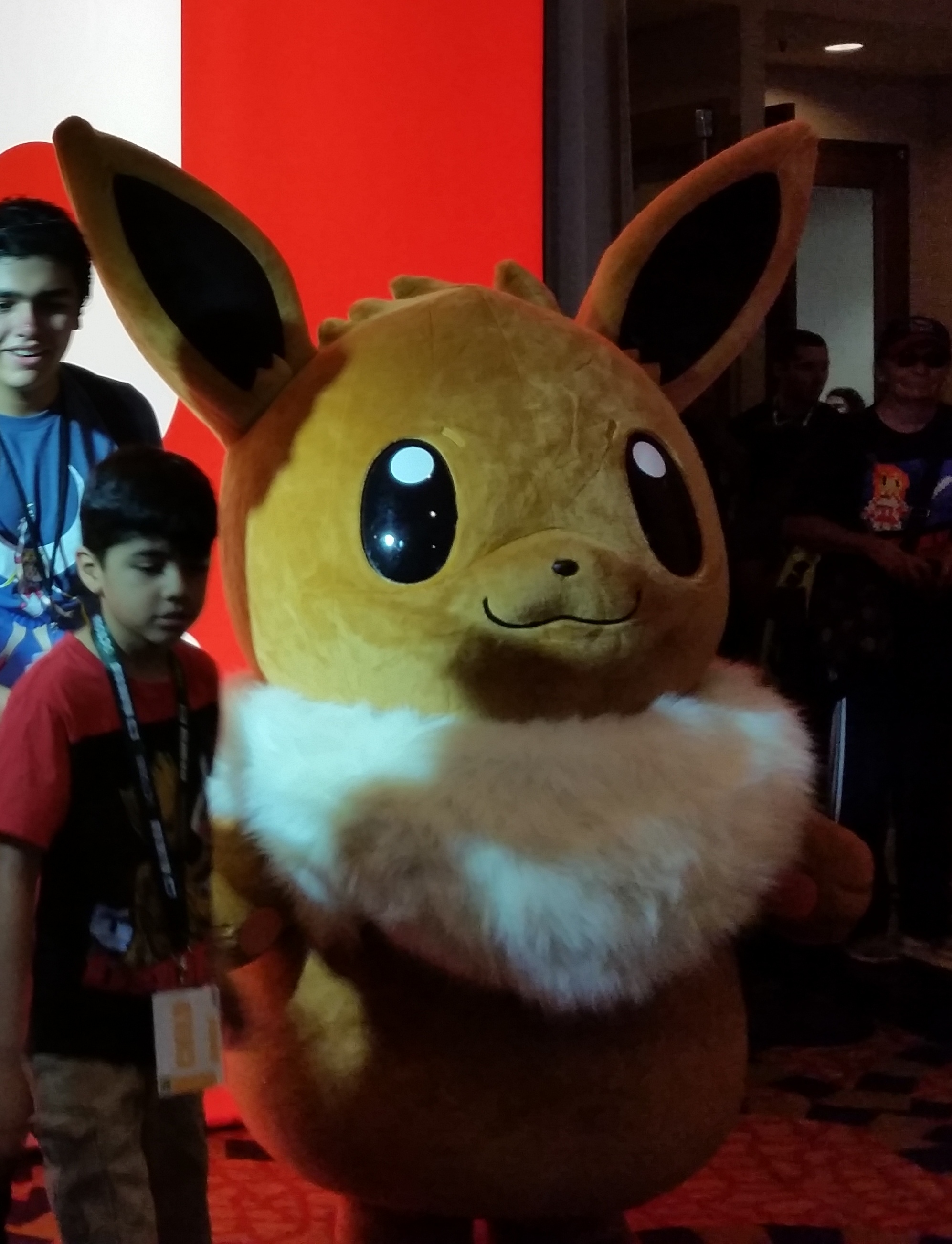
An Eevee mascot at a Nintendo event. Eevee has proven to be a popular and enduring Pokémon since its debut.

Due to its popularity, Eevee and its evolutions have frequently been used in much of the Pokémon merchandising, such as toys. Eevee was a part of a set of Pokémon figures released for Pokémon Rumble U, with IGN labeling it as a "fan favorite". A special Eevee-themed Nintendo 3DS XL was released in Japan in celebration of the fifteenth anniversary of Pokémon Centre retail establishments. Similarly, a special Nintendo Switch featuring Eevee was also released. Eevee has also been a part of various Nintendo events, which allow the players to obtain special Pokémon that are being distributed (one example in Eevee's case was a shiny Eevee distribution). Eevee was also one of the several first generation Pokémon to get a special DVD with episodes starring itself during the tenth anniversary of the Pokémon franchise. Eevee and its evolutions were also featured on the side of a jet.

While Eevee was not originally promoted as heavily as other Pokémon, Eevee's popularity has grown throughout the years, and it is now one of the series' most iconic Pokémon. Eevee and its evolutions have received generally positive reception, and it was noted as one of the most popular Pokémon at the offices of The Pokémon Company. Japanese fans of the series have coined November 21 as "Eevee Day" due the pronunciation being similar to Eevee's Japanese name Eievui. Eevee Day has since been officially adopted by the Pokémon Company, and was later made an official anniversary by the Japan Anniversary Association. Eevee has been cited as a "fan favorite" Pokémon and a franchise staple due to its popularity.

Gita Jackson of Kotaku commented on how Eevee symbolized growth, stating that "They are a blank slate. Eevee is that moment before you step out the door and start your adventure. They represent the innocence of not yet knowing who you are, and the excitement of finding out." They further highlighted how the potential of Eevee made evolving one feel sad, as it meant losing part of what made Eevee unique. Eevee's evolutions and adaptability in the game's lore were also highlighted as reflecting the real-world concept of evolution, and it has been cited as a surprisingly realistic interpretation of the phenomenon. Joshua Yel, writing for IGN, highlighted Eevee's popularity and universal appeal as being a result of its appealing design. The versatility of the Pokémon in game, as well as its cute design, were cited as reasons it was such an enduring Pokémon among fans of the series. Due to the versatility of the design, Eevee has received a wide amount of fanart and other creative fan works, which has been cited as being a result of the creativity the design allows fans to get out of it.

Eevee's appearance in Pokémon: Let's Go, Pikachu! and Pokémon: Let's Go, Eevee! received positive reviews. Hope Corrigan, writing for GameRevolution, commented on Eevee's appearance in the game. She highlighted the scene where Eevee interrupts the player's first Pokémon selection as immediately making her nostalgic for the days of her childhood when she used Eevee. While criticizing Eevee's power in the game, she praised the emotion that it brought her, stating that "For all her overpowered attitude, this Eevee is mine and she loved me right from the beginning. I know she's just a few pixels in a virtual world but she is my Eevee and after all these years, I'm not ready to give that up." Siliconera writer Jenni Lada also highlighted Eevee's appearance in the game, praising the expanded role it played in the game. She also praised the interactions and smaller moments that the player could have with Eevee, citing them as making the player grow easily attached to the Pokémon.
