= Eva (name) =

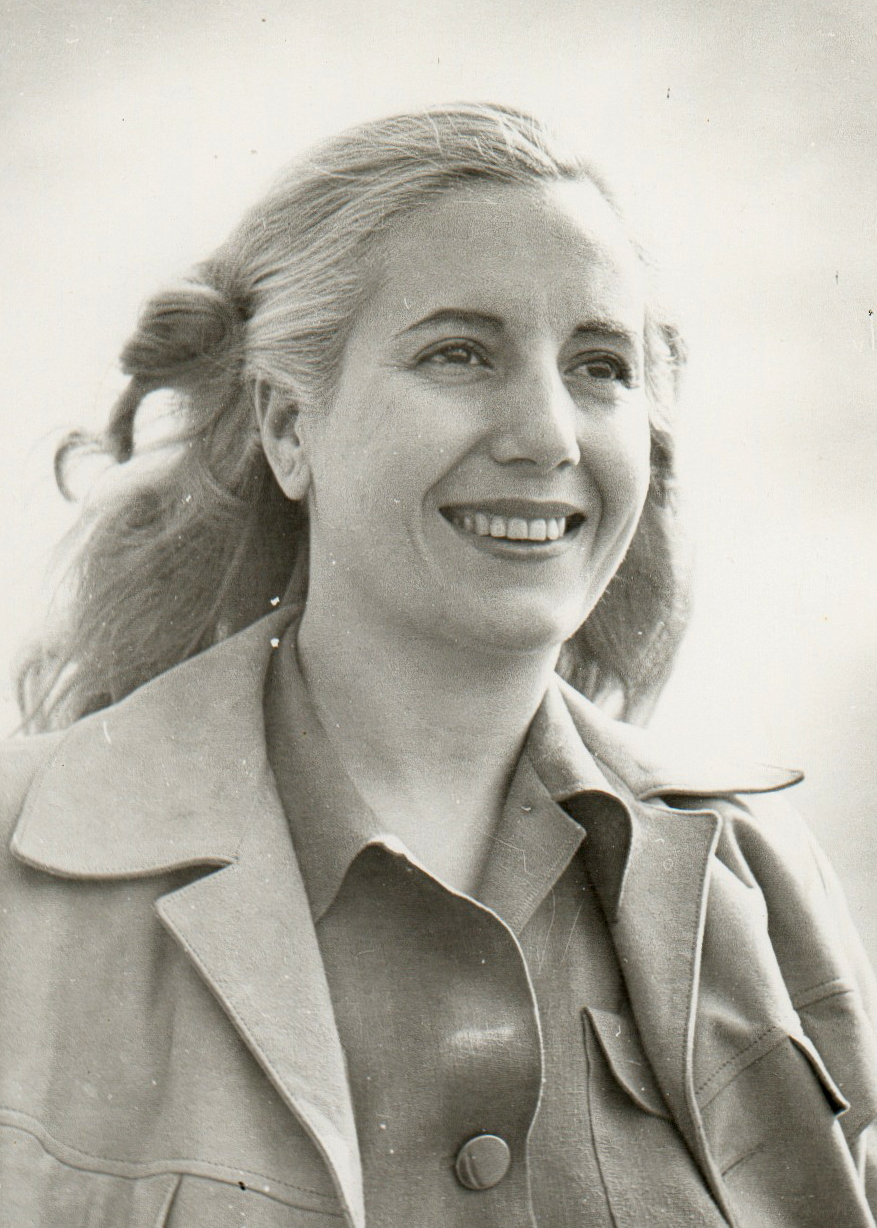
- Eva Perón
- Gender: Feminine

Origin
- Origin: Latin, Hebrew
- Meaning: life

Other names
- Related names: Eve, Ieva, Evita

Eva is a female given name derived from the Greek Εὕα (Heúa), and ultimately from the Hebrew חַוָּה (Ḥawwāh), the name of the first woman in the Book of Genesis. The name spread widely in Europe through the Latin Bible and remains common in many languages. A common English form of the name is Eve, although Eva is more popular in most English-speaking countries. Evita is a diminutive form in Spanish.

== People ==
=== A–F ===
- Eva Aariak (born 1955), Canadian politician
- Eva Adamová (born 1960), Czech volleyball player
- Eva Björg Ægisdóttir (born 1988), Icelandic writer
- Eva Ahnert-Rohlfs (1912–1954), German astronomer
- Eva Ahuja (born 1980), Indian actress
- Eva Allen Alberti (1856–1938), American dramatics teacher
- Eva Alexander (born 1976), British actress and television presenter
- Eva Alordiah (born 1988), Nigerian rapper, entertainer, make-up artist, & fashion designer
- Eva Amador Guillén (born 1957), Spanish politician
- Eva Amaral (born 1973), Spanish singer
- Eva Amurri (born 1985), American actress
- Eva Andén (1886–1970), Swedish lawyer
- Eva Andersson-Dubin (born 1961), Swedish physician, former model and beauty pageant titleholder
- Eva Angelina (born 1985), American adult film actress
- Eva Aronson (1908–1999), Sweden-born American chess player
- Eva Arvidsson (born 1948), Swedish politician
- Eva Asderaki (born 1982), Greek tennis chair umpire
- Eva Avila (born 1987), 2006 Canadian Idol winner
- Eva von Bahr (physicist) (1874–1962), Swedish scientist
- Eva von Bahr (make-up artist) (born 1968), Swedish make-up artist and hair stylist
- Eva Beem (1932–1944), Dutch Jewish child; gassed to death in Auschwitz concentration camp
- Eva Bella (born 2002), American voice actress
- Eva Best (1851–1925), American story writer, poet, music composer, dramatist
- Eva Birthistle (born 1974), Irish actress and writer
- Eva Blanco (1981–1997), Spanish murder victim
- Eva Borušovičová (1970–2025), Slovak director, screenwriter and writer
- Eva Boto (born 1995), Slovenian singer
- Eva Narcissus Boyd (1943–2003), American singer
- Eva Bowring (1892–1985), U.S. politician and United States Senator
- Eva Braun (1912–1945), photographer, lover, and later wife, of Adolf Hitler
- Eva Maria Brown (1856–1917), American social reformer
- Eva Burrows (1929–2015), 13th General of The Salvation Army
- Eva Cadena, Mexican politician from Veracruz
- Eva Callimachi-Catargi (1855–1913), French heiress and subject of two paintings by Henri Fantin-Latour
- Eva Carneiro, Gibraltar-born British sports medicine specialist and former first-team doctor at Chelsea F.C.
- Eva Cassidy (1963–1996), American singer
- Eva Maria Düringer Cavalli (born 1959), Austrian fashion designer and beauty pageant titleholder
- Eva Celbová (born 1975), Czech beach volleyball player
- Eva Christodoulou (born 1983), Greek gymnast
- Eva Clare (1885–1961), Canadian musician and educator
- Eva Clarke (born 1945), British-Czech Holocaust survivor
- Eva Clayton (born 1934), U.S. politician and United States Congresswoman
- Eva Colorni (1941–1985), Italian economist
- Eva Crocker, Canadian writer
- Eva Cruz (born 1974), Puerto Rican volleyball player
- Eva Czemerys (1940–1996), German-born film actress
- Eva Dahlgren (born 1960), Swedish pop musician
- Eva Dickson (1905–1938), Swedish explorer
- Eva Dimas (born 1973), Salvadoran weightlifter
- Eva Craig Graves Doughty (1852–?), American journalist
- Eva de Braose (fl. 1238–1255), co-heiress of William de Braose
- Eva Duldig (born 1938), Austrian-born Australian and Dutch tennis player, author
- Eva Ekeblad (1724–1786), Swedish botanist
- Eva Eugenio (born 1946), Filipina singer
- Eva Fabian (born 1993), American-Israeli world champion swimmer
- Eva Fontaine (born 1974), British actress
- Eva Forest (1928–2007), Spanish far-left activist, writer and prisoner
- Eva Frankfurther (1930–1959), German-born British artist

=== G–L ===
- Eva Gabor (1919–1995), Hungarian-born American actress
- Eva Grenouilloux (born 2004), French short-track speed skater
- Eva Gordon-Simpson (1901–1980), British racing driver
- Eva Gore-Booth (1870–1926), Irish poet, dramatist, suffragist, social worker and labour activist
- Eva Gothlin (1957–2006), Swedish historian
- Eva Gouel (1885–1915), French choreographer and girlfriend of Pablo Picasso during the early 1910s
- Eva Grant (1925–2024), Greek and British glamour photographer
- Eva Gray (actress) (born 1971), British actress
- Eva Gray (cricketer) (born 2000), English cricketer
- Eva Gredal (1927–1995), Danish politician
- Eva Green (born 1980), French actress
- Eva Kinney Griffith (1852–1918), American journalist, activist, novelist, editor, publisher
- Eva-Lena Gustavsson (born 1956), Swedish politician
- Eva Habil, Egyptian lawyer and politician
- Eva Hauserová (1954–2023), Czech journalist and writer
- Éva Hegedüs (born 1957), Hungarian Chairman-CEO and majority shareholder of Gránit Bank
- Eva Herman (born 1958), German television presenter and author
- Eva Herzigová (born 1973), Czech supermodel
- Eva Hesse (1936–1970), German-born American artist
- Eva Horváthová (born 1974), Slovak physician and politician
- Eva Houston (born 2001), American Paralympic athlete
- Eva Ibbotson (1925–2010), Austrian-born British novelist of children's books
- Eva of Isenburg (died 1531), Dutch Princess-Abbess of Thorn Abbey
- Eva Jinek (born 1978), American-born Dutch journalist and television presenter
- Eva Kaili (born 1978), Greek politician
- Eva-Lotta Kiibus (born 2003), Estonian figure skater
- Eva Köhler (born 1947), wife of the German President Horst Köhler
- Eva Kotamanidou (1936–2020), Greek actress
- Eva Kristínová (1928–2020), Slovak actress
- Eva LaRue (born 1966), American actress
- Eva Lettenbauer (born 1992), German politician
- Eva Longoria (born 1975), American actress

=== M–P ===
- Eva Anne Madden (1863–1958), American educator, journalist, playwright, author
- Eva Magni (1909–2005), Italian stage and film actress
- Eva Maler (born 1988), German playwright
- Eva Marie (born 1984),American actress, fashion designer, model, and professional wrestler
- Eva Marija (born 2005), Luxembourgish singer-songwriter and violinist
- Eva Marshal (1203–1246), Anglo-Norman noblewoman
- Eva Matsuzaki (born 1944), first female president of the Royal Architectural Institute of Canada
- Eva McLaren (1852–1921), British suffragist, writer, and political campaigner
- Eva Melander (born 1974), Swedish actress
- Eva Melmuková (1932–2022), Czech Lutheran theologist and historian
- Eva Mendes (born 1974), American actress
- Eva Merthen (1723–1811), known as "The Duchess of Finland"
- Eva Miranda, Spanish mathematician
- Eva Moll (born 1975), German contemporary artist
- Eva Moltesen (1871–1934), Finnish-Danish writer and peace activist
- Eva Moore (1870–1955), English actress
- Eva Morris (1885–2000), native of England, known for a time as the oldest recognized person in the world
- Eva Moskowitz (born 1964), U.S. educator and former politician
- Eva Mosnáková (1929–2024), Slovak human rights activist
- Eva Mottley (1953–1985), Barbadian-born British actress
- Eva, birth name of Hatice Muazzez, mother of the Ottoman Sultan Ahmed II
- Eva Mudocci (1872–1953), British violinist
- Eva Neander (1921–1950), Swedish journalist
- Eva Nedinkovska (born 1983), ethnic Macedonian singer
- Eva Noblezada (born 1996), American theatre actress and singer
- Eva O'Hara, British actress
- Eva Okaro (born 2006), British swimmer
- Eva Ortiz (born 1961), American rock singer
- Eva Ortiz Vilella (born 1975), Spanish politician
- Eva Pagels (born 1954), German field hockey player
- Eva Palmer-Sikelianos (1874–1952), American choreographer and art historian
- Eva Pawlik (1927–1983), Austrian figure skater
- Eva Perón (1919–1952), Argentine First Lady, political leader, actor, and philanthropist; wife of Juan Perón
- Eva Haljecka Petković (1870–1947), Serbian doctor
- Eva Pel, Dutch visual artist
- Eva Philbin (1914–2005), Irish chemist
- Eva Pigford (born 1984), American model
- Eva Polna (born 1975), Russian singer, composer, and songwriter
- Eva Polttila (born 1946), Finnish TV news anchor
- Eva Pölzing, German singer
- Eva Pope (born 1967), British actress
- Eva Poveda (born 1965), Spanish scientist
- Eva Püssa (born 1971), Estonian actress

=== R–Z ===
- Eva Ramstedt (1879–1974), Swedish physicist who worked with Marie Curie and Ellen Gleditsch
- Eva Reign, American actress and journalist
- Eva Rivas, Russian-Armenian singer
- Eva Rysová (1932–2023), Slovak actress
- Eva Marie Saint (1924–2026), American actress
- Eva Santamaría (born 1971), Spanish singer
- Éva Sas (born 1970), French politician
- Eva Schloss (1929–2026), Austrian-English Holocaust survivor and memoirist
- Eva Silverstein (born 1970), American physicist and string theorist
- Eva Simons (born 1984), Dutch singer
- Eva Siracká (1926–2023), Slovak physician
- Eva Munson Smith (1843–1915), American composer, poet, author
- Eva Švíglerová (born 1971), Czech professional tennis player
- Eva Tanguay (1878–1947), Canadian-born vaudeville entertainer
- Eva Griffith Thompson (1842–1925), American newspaper editor
- Eva Todor (1919–2017), Brazilian actress
- Eva Vlaardingerbroek (born 1996), Dutch legal philosopher, political commentator and activist
- Eva Voraberger (born 1990), Austrian boxer
- Eva Wilma (1933–2021), Brazilian actress
- Eva Winther (1921–2014), Swedish politician
- Eva Zuk (born 1991), Polish model

== Fictional characters ==
- Eva, Marco's mother from the Animorphs book series
- Eva Stratt Head of Project Hail Mary
- Eva, in the Devil May Cry series
- Eva, a character in the 2008 3D computer-animated film Igor
- Eva, the Goddess of Water in the mythology of the MMORPG Lineage II
- EVA, character in the Metal Gear video game series
- Eva, a female keel-billed toucan who is Rafael's wife in Rio and Rio 2
- Eva, a character in the Canadian animated television series Total Drama
- Eva, one of the main characters in the anime series Tweeny Witches
- Eva, protagonist character in What's Left of Me by Kat Zhang
- E.V.A, an aspect of Fantomex in Marvel Comics
- EVE, a character in the 2008 Pixar film WALL-E whose name is mispronounced "Eva" by the film's title character
- Eva Bell (Tempus), a mutant character in Marvel Comics
- Eva Falco, a character in the British soap opera Hollyoaks
- Eva Kant, character from Diabolik comics and Danger: Diabolik film
- Eva Luna, main character of Isabel Allende's picaresque novel
- Eva Mapendo, in 2018 romantic drama series Ngayon at Kailanman, portrayed by Julia Barretto
- Eva Kviig Mohn, a main character in the Norwegian television series Skam
- Eva Nilsson, character on the series Star Trek: Discovery
- Eva Price, a character in the British soap opera Coronation Street
- Eva Quintero, a member of Strange Academy and the cousin of Reptil
- Evangeline St. Clare, called Eva, a major character in the novel Uncle Tom's Cabin
- Eva Strong, a character in the British soap opera Hollyoaks
- Eva Ushiromiya, a character in the visual novel, manga and anime series Umineko When They Cry
- Eva Wei, the main character of the Jetix animated television series Oban Star Racers
- Eva Zimmer, a character in the webseries The Zimmer Twins

== See also ==
- Eve (name)
- Evita (disambiguation)
