= Evangeline (disambiguation) =

Evangeline is an 1847 epic poem by Henry Wadsworth Longfellow.

Evangeline may also refer to:

== People ==
- Evangeline (given name)

== Places ==
- Evangeline Parish, Louisiana
- Evangeline Township, Michigan
- Evangeline, Louisiana, an unincorporated community in Acadia Parish, Louisiana
- Evangeline, Gloucester County, New Brunswick, a Canadian community

== Music ==
=== Albums ===
- Evangeline (Emmylou Harris album)
- Evangeline (Gary Lucas album), 1996
- Evangeline (Mary Anne Hobbs compilation)
- Evangeline (Ulf Lundell album)

=== Songs ===
- "Evangeline", a song written by Robbie Robertson and performed by The Band with Emmylou Harris from The Last Waltz, and by Harris with Dolly Parton and Linda Ronstadt on Harris's album Evangeline
- "Evangeline", a song by Los Lobos from their album How Will the Wolf Survive?, also performed by the Jerry Garcia Band on their eponymous double live album
- "Evangeline" (song), a single by Cocteau Twins
- "Evangeline", a song from the Matthew Sweet album Girlfriend based on the comic book character
- "Evangeline", a song from Bad Religion from the album The Process of Belief
- "Evangeline", a song from Raffi's 1977 album Adult Entertainment
- "Evangeline", a 1987 single by The Icicle Works
- "Evangeline", the first single from Chad Brock's 1999 debut album; also recorded by Sammy Kershaw on his 2006 album Honky Tonk Boots
- "Evangeline", a song from Max Raptor's 2013 album Mother's Ruin
- "Evangeline", a song from Angels of Light's 2001 album How I Loved You
- "Evangeline", a single from The Mission's 2001 album Aura
- "Evangeline", a single from Stephen Sanchez's 2023 album Angel Face
- "Evangeline", a song from Eric Church's 2025 album Evangeline vs. the Machine

=== Musicals and opera ===
- Evangeline (1874 musical), an 1874 musical with music by Edward E. Rice, the first American production billed as musical comedy
- Evangeline, a 1946 West End musical by George Posford and Harry Jacobson
- Evangeline (1999 musical), a 1998 Canadian musical by Jamie Wax and Paul Taranto
- Evangeline, a 2014 Canadian opera, composed by Colin Doroschuk of the band Men Without Hats

=== Other ===
- Evangeline (band), a 1990s country-pop band
- Evangeline Records, a US record company

== Film ==
- Evangeline (1913 film), a 1913 Canadian drama film
- Evangeline (1919 film), a 1919 silent film
- Evangeline (1929 film), a 1929 silent film
- Evangeline (2013 film), a 2013 Canadian supernatural thriller film

== Other ==
- Evangeline (comics), a 1980s comic book
- Evangeline (train), a former passenger train in Nova Scotia operated by Via Rail
