= Evangelina =

- Gender: Female

Origin
- Language: Greek
- Meaning: gospel, good news

Other names
- Related names: Eva, Angelina, Lina

Evangelina and Evangeline are feminine given names, diminutives of Latin "evangelium" ("gospel", itself from Greek Ευαγγέλιο "gospel", meaning "good news").

People with these names include:

== Evangelina ==
- Evangelina Bottero (1859–1950), Italian teacher and populariser of science
- Evangelina Carrozzo (born 1980), Argentine model, dancer, and beauty queen
- Evangelina Cosio y Cisneros (1877–1970), Cuban rebel
- Evangelina Elizondo (1929–2017), Mexican actress
- Evangelina Guerrero Zacarías (1904–1949), Filipina poet
- Evangelina Oyo Ebule, Equatorial Guinean politician
- Evangelina Salazar (born 1946), Argentine actress
- Evangelina Sobredo Galanes (1948–1976), known as Cecilia, Spanish singer and songwriter
- Evangelina Villegas (1924–2017), Mexican biochemist
- Evangelina Vigil-Piñón (born 1949), poet

== Evangeline ==
- Evangeline Anderson-Rajkumar, American theologian
- Evangeline Atwood (1906–1987), American historian, activist, and philanthropist
- Evangeline Barongo, Ugandan author of children's literature
- Evangeline Wilbour Blashfield (1858–1918), American writer and translator
- Evangeline Booth, British evangelist
- Evangeline Bruce, American writer
- Evangeline Edwards (1888–1957), The first female professor of Chinese anywhere in the Western world
- Evangeline Lydia Emsley, Canadian (WW1) nurse
- Evangeline Rachel Hall, American educator
- Evangeline Lilly, Canadian actress
- Evangeline Marrs Whipple, American theologian
- Evangeline Papageorge (1906–2001), American biochemist, medical school dean
- Evangeline Russell, American actress known for her work in silent Westerns
- Evangeline Thillayampalam (c. 1900 - 1976), Sri Lankan educator
- Evangeline Walton (1907–1996), American author
- Evangeline "Evie" MacDonald, Australian actress, model, and transgender activist.

== Fictional characters ==
- Evangeline, the name of a star from the 2009 animated Disney film The Princess and the Frog
- Evangeline, a character in the 2005 film Nanny McPhee
- Evangeline, a character in the novel series Throne of Glass
- Evangeline Bellefontaine, main character of the 1847 poem Evangeline, A Tale of Acadie
- Evangeline Eliott, a main character in the British television series The House of Eliott
- Evangeline Harcourt, in the musical Anything Goes
- Evangeline A.K. McDowell, a character in the manga and anime series Negima! Magister Negi Magi
- Evangeline "Eva" St. Clare, a character in the 1852 novel Uncle Tom's Cabin
- Evangeline Whedon, a mutant character from Marvel Comics

== See also ==
- Evangeline (disambiguation)
