= Evi (given name) =

Female given name

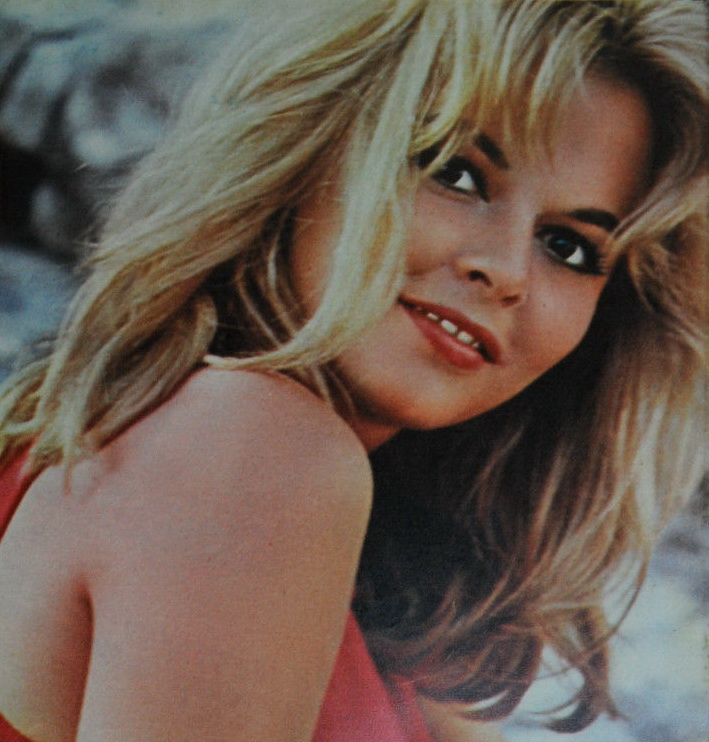
Italian-Greek actress Evi Marandi

Evi is a feminine given name.

Notable people with the name include:

- Evi Christofilopoulou (born 1956), Greek politician
- Evi Eva (born 1899–1895), German actress
- Evi Gkotzaridis (born 1969), Greek historian
- Evi Goffin (born 1981), Belgian vocalist
- Evi Hanssen (born 1978), Flemish singer and presenter
- Evi Huss (born 1974), German slalom canoer
- Evi Kratzer (born 1961), Swiss cross country skier
- Evi Lanig (born 1933), German skier
- Evi Liivak (1924–1996), Estonian violinist
- Evi Marandi (born 1941), Greek-Italian actress
- Evi Maltagliati (1908–1986), Italian actress
- Evi Mittermaier (born 1953), German alpine skier
- Evi Nemeth (1940–2013), American engineer, author and teacher in computer science
- Evi Edna Ogholi (born 1965), Nigerian musician
- Evi Quaid (born 1963), American film director
- Evi Rauer (1915–2004), Estonian actress
- Evi Sachenbacher-Stehle (born 1980), German cross-country skier
- Evi Sappl (born 1947), German speed skater
- Evi Tetzalidou (born 1990), Greek water polo player
- Evi Tausen (born 1981), Faroese singer
- Evi Tihemets (born 1932), Estonian printmaker and graphic artist
- Evi Tsamoglou (born 1978), Greek hammer thrower
- Evi Van Acker (born 1985), Belgian sailor

== See also ==
- Eva (name)
- Eve
- Evie (given name)
