= Nomi =

Nomi may refer to:

== People ==
- Nomi (name), list of people with the name

== Places ==
- Nōmi, Hiroshima, a town in Hiroshima Prefecture, Japan
- Nomi, Ishikawa, a city in Ishikawa Prefecture in Japan
- Nomi, Trentino, a municipality in Trentino, Italy
- Nomi District, Ishikawa
- North Miami, Florida
- Northern Michigan
- North Minneapolis, Minnesota

== Other uses ==
- The Nomi Song, a 2004 documentary about Klaus Nomi
- Japanese chisel
- Non-occlusive mesenteric ischemia
- Nomi (retail chain), network of retail supermarkets
- Nomi AI, a digital assistant in Nio Inc. cars
- Nomi.ai, an AI companion developed by Alex Cardinell

== See also ==
- Naomi (disambiguation)
- Nomis (disambiguation)
