= Ieva =

Female given name

- Gender: Female

Origin
- Region of origin: Latvia, Lithuania

Other names
- Related names: Eva, Eve, Evita

Ieva is a Latvian, Lithuanian, and dialectal Finnish (more commonly Eeva) given name, counterpart of English Eve, derived from a Hebrew name meaning "life" or "living one". It can also mean full of life or mother of life. It is the standard biblical form of Eve in many European languages.

== People ==
- Ieva Adomavičiūtė (born 1994), Lithuanian rower
- Ieva Budraitė (born 1992), Lithuanian politician, green leader
- Ieva Gaile (born 1997), Latvian figure skater
- Ieva Ilvesa (born 1977), Latvian politician and cybersecurity expert; former First Lady of Estonia
- Ieva Kokoreviča (born 1985), Latvian former beauty pageant contestant
- Ieva Krusta (born 1976), Latvian curler
- Ieva Kubliņa (born 1982), Latvian basketball player
- Ieva Lagūna (born 1990), Latvian model
- Ieva Lešinska (born 1958), Latvian translator, journalist and editor
- Ieva Narkutė (born 1987), Lithuanian singer-songwriter
- Ieva Pulvere (born 1990), Latvian basketball player
- Ieva Sargautytė (born 1981), Lithuanian orienteering competitor
- Ieva Simonaitytė (1897–1978), Lithuanian writer
- Ieva Tāre (born 1974), Latvian basketball player
- Ieva Zasimauskaitė (born 1993), Lithuanian singer
- Ieva Zunda (born 1978), Latvian athlete

== See also ==
- Ievan polkka, Finnish song about a woman named Ieva
