= Pel =

Pel or PEL may refer to:

== People ==
- Albert Pel (1849–1924), a French serial killer
- David Pel (born 1991), a Dutch tennis player
- Eva Pel, a Dutch visual artist
- Hendrik Pel (1818–1876), a Dutch zoologist and government official
- Pieter Klazes Pel (1852–1919), a Dutch physician

== Science and technology ==
- PEL sector light, a projector-style marine beacon
- Pixel, pel, or picture element, is a physical point in a raster image
- Permissible exposure limit, an American legal limit for exposure to a chemical substance or physical agent
- Peak of eternal light, a point on the surface of an astronomical body always in sunlight
- Primary effusion lymphoma, a blood cancer

== Other uses ==
- Pel, Iran, or Pil, a village in Mazandaran Province, Iran
- PEL (Pakistan), Pak Elektron Limited, a Pakistani engineering corporation
- Party of the European Left, a European political party
- Wood and Allied Workers' Union, a former trade union in Finland
- IOC sport code for basque pelota at the Summer Olympics

== See also ==
- Pels (disambiguation)
