= Eve (name) =

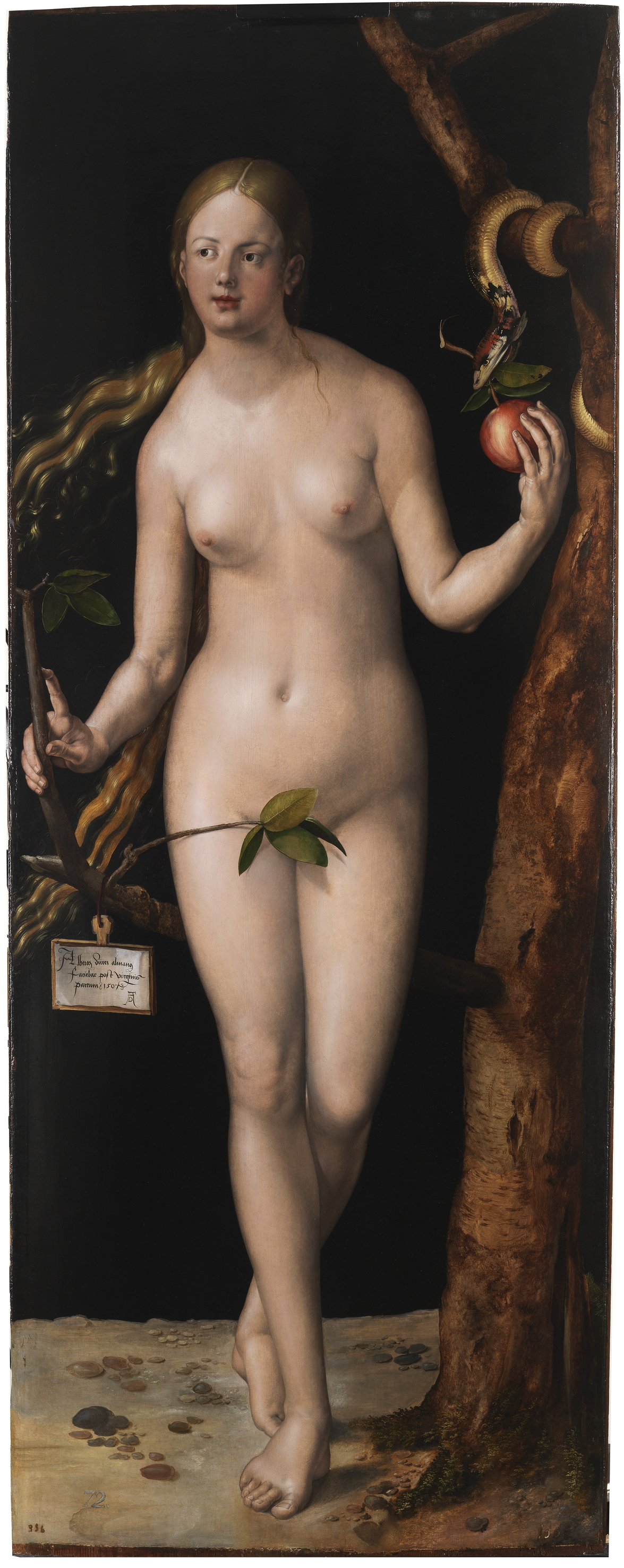
- Albrecht Dürer painting of the Biblical Eve. In Genesis, Eve was the first woman created.
- Gender: Female

Origin
- Origin: Hebrew, via English
- Meaning: "Living"

Other names
- Related names: Eva, Evita, Evie, Eeva, Evelyn, Evans

Eve /iːv/ is a feminine English given name, derived from the Latin name Eva, in turn originating with the Hebrew חַוָּה (Chavah/Havah – chavah, to breathe, and chayah, to live, or to give life). In Greece the name Eve is Evi (Εύη), a diminutive of the baptismal name Paraskevi.

== History ==
The name has much significance in the Abrahamic religions. Eve, according to Abrahamic tradition, is widely beloved as the mother of all of mankind. She was the first woman that God created, and she was both the wife and companion of Adam.

Eve is described as being named Havah in the Torah.

The Catholic Church by ancient tradition recognizes both Adam and Eve (in Latin: Adam et Eva) as saints. And the traditional liturgical feast of Saints Adam and Eve was celebrated on December 24 since the Middle Ages. Eve is first found as a name being used in England in the 12th century. However, the name did not gain much popularity until the Protestant Reformation. As discussed in Kathleen M. Crowther's Adam and Eve in the Protestant Reformation: "The story of Adam and Eve, ubiquitous in the art and literature of the period, played a central role in the religious controversies of sixteenth-century Europe... The story of Adam and Eve was of fundamental importance to sixteenth-century Protestant reformers who sought to ground Christian belief and salvation in the free grace of God..."

In pre-Reformation England the usage of the name Eve was most commonly associated with Jews, who used the form of Chavah/Havah. The name in the form of Haya (also spelled Haiya, Chaya, or less commonly, Kaya) and Haim are also derived from the root of Chavah/Havah; all variations being commonly found throughout the world, especially the Middle East, to this day. Famous examples of individuals with such names are Princess Haya of Jordan, Haim Saban, and Victor Raúl Haya de la Torre.

The name Evelyn itself is derived from Eve, and was one of the most popular names for girls between 1910 and 1930.

== Transliterations of Eve ==
- Arabic: حواء (Hawa, Hava)
- Albanian: Eva, Hava
- Amharic: ሔዋን (Ḥēwani)/ ሄዋን (Hēwani)
- Armenian: Eva
- Azerbaijani: Həvva
- Basque: Eba/Bezpera
- Belarusian: Ева (Jeva)
- Bosnian: Eva, Hava
- Breton: Eva
- Bulgarian: Ева (Eva)
- Burmese: ဧဝ (Ewa)
- Catalan: Eva
- Chinese: 夏娃 (Xiàwá)
- Croatian: Eva
- Czech: Eva
- Dutch: Eva
- Estonian: Eve, Eeva, Evi
- Filipino: Eba
- Finnish: Eeva, Eevi
- French: Ève
- Ge'ez: Hiwan
- German: Eva
- Greek: (Evi)
- Georgian: ევა (Eva)
- Hebrew: חוה (Chava) (Hava), (Hawa (ancient pronunciation)
- Hindi: ईवा (Eeva)
- Hungarian: Éva
- Indonesian: Hawa, Eva, Evi, Evelyn, Evans, Evie, Evelina, Eveline, Evita
- Icelandic: Eva
- Irish: Éabha, Aoibhe
- Italian: Eva
- Japanese: イブ (Ibu), エバ (Eba)
- Javanese: Hawa
- Kazakh: Хауа (Xawa)
- Kyrgyz: Обо (Obo)/Ева (Eva)
- Korean: 이브 (Ibeu)
- Kurdish: حەوا (Sorani: Ḧewa; Kurmanji: Hawa)
- Lao: ເອວາ (Eva)
- Latin: Eva (or Heva)
- Lithuanian and Latvian: Ieva, Īva, Eva, Evita
- Macedonian: Ева (Eva), Ива (Iva)
- Malay: Hawa
- Malayalam: ഹവ്വാ (Havvaa)
- Maltese: Eva
- Mongolian: Ева (Yeva)
- Old English: Éfe
- Oromo: Hewaan
- Portuguese: Eva
- Pashto: حوا (Hava/Hawa)
- Polish: Ewa
- Persian: حوا (Havva, Hawa)
- Romanian: Eva
- Russian: Eвa (Yeva), Эва (Ehva)
- Scottish Gaelic: Eubha
- Serbian: Eva/Eвa
- Sindhi: حوا/हवअ (Hoa)
- Slovenian: Eva
- Slovak: Eva
- Spanish: Eva
- Swahili: Eva, Hawa
- Tagalog: Eba
- Tajik: Ҳавво (Havvo), Хавво (Xavvo)
- Tamil: ஏவாள் (Ēvāḷ)
- Tatar: Хаува (Xawva)
- Telugu: హవ్వ (Havva)
- Thai: เอวา (Ewa), อีฟ (Ip)
- Tigrinya: ሄዋን (Hewanə)
- Turkish: Havva
- Turkmen: How
- Urdu: حوا (Hawa)
- Uzbek: Havva
- Uyghur: ھاۋا (Hawa/Һава)
- Ukrainian: Єва (Yeva)
- Vietnamese: Ê Va
- Welsh: Efa
- Yoruba: Efa

== People called Eve ==
=== Given name ===
- Eve (rapper) (born 1978), American hip-hop artist and actor
- Eve Ai (born 1987), Taiwanese singer-songwriter
- Eve Arden (1908–1990), American actress
- Eve Beglarian (born 1958), Armenian-American composer
- Eve Brodlique (1867–1949), British-born Canadian/American author, journalist
- Eve Carson (1985–2008), American university student and murder victim: Murder of Eve Carson
- Eve Edzerza, a Tahltan woman from British Columbia, Canada
- Eve Ensler (born 1953), American playwright
- Eve Gardiner (1913–1992), English beautician and remedial make-up artist
- Eve Glenn, Australian artist, musician, and performer with Wimmins Circus and Toxic Shock 1979–1982
- Eve Jobs (born 1998), American fashion model; daughter of Steve Jobs and Laurene Powell Jobs
- Eve McMahon (born 2004), Irish Olympic sailor
- Eve Muirhead (born 1990), Scottish curler
- Eve Myles (born 1978), Welsh actress
- Eve Pormeister (born 1956), Estonian Germanist, literary scholar, critic and cultural mediator
- Eve Oja (1948–2019), Estonian mathematician
- Eve Pancharoen (born 1981), Thai singer-songwriter
- Ève Paul-Margueritte (1885–1971), French novelist, translator
- Eve Pollard (born 1945), British journalist
- Eve Plumb (born 1958), American actor and painter
- Eve Queler (born 1931), American conductor
- Eve Ridley (born 2011), English actress
- Eve Kosofsky Sedgwick (1950–2009), American queer theorist
- Eve Torres (born 1984), professional wrestler

=== Chava (Hebrew form) ===
- Chava Alberstein, Israeli singer
- Chava Lifshitz (1936–2005), Austrian-Israeli chemist
- Chava Rosenfarb, Yiddish writer
- Chava Shapiro, Volhynian Jewish writer

=== Surname ===
- Alice Eve (born 1982), British actress
- Angus Eve (born 1973), Trinidadian football (soccer) player
- Arthur Eve (born 1933), American politician
- Arthur Stewart Eve (1862–1948), English physicist
- Dick Eve (1901–1970), Australian diver who competed in the 1924 Summer Olympics
- Harry Trelawney Eve (1856–1940), English barrister, judge and politician
- Laverne Eve (born 1965), Bahamian javelin thrower
- Leecia Eve (born 1964), American attorney and politician
- Lisvel Elisa Eve (born 1991), Dominican Republic volleyball player
- Maria Louise Eve (1848-?), American poet
- Nomi Eve (born 1968), American author
- Trevor Eve (born 1951), British actor

== See also ==
- Eve (disambiguation)
- Hawa (given name)
