= Evita =

Evita may refer to:

== Arts ==
- Evita (album), a 1976 concept album about the life of Eva Perón produced by Andrew Lloyd Webber and Tim Rice
  - Evita (musical), a 1978 stage musical based on the concept album
    - Evita: Premiere American Recording, a 1979 album containing a recording of the above musical made by its 1979 Broadway cast
  - Evita (1996 film), based on the concept album, starring Madonna
    - Evita (soundtrack), the film's soundtrack
- Evita (2008 film), a documentary about Eva Péron
- Evita Bezuidenhout, a character portrayed by South African performer, author, satirist, and social activist Pieter-Dirk Uys
- Evita Fusilier, a recurring character from the American television series Cloak & Dagger

== People with the name ==
- Evita Griskenas (born 2000), American rhythmic gymnast
- Evita Manji, Greek musician
- Evita Muñoz (1936–2016), Mexican actress and comedian
- Eva Perón (also Evita; 1919–1952), wife of Argentine President Juan Perón (1895–1974) and First Lady of Argentina
- Evita Robinson (born 1984), African-American woman known for her role as a pioneer of the urban travel movement
- Evita Tezeno (born 1960), American artist

== Other ==
- Evita (moth), a monotypic moth genus in the family Geometridae

== See also ==
- Eva (name)
- Eve (name)
- Ieva
- Evita Movement, a social, piquetero and political movement of Argentina
