= Evie (given name) =

Evie is a feminine given name, diminutive of Eve and Evelyn, and often a short form (hypocorism) of another, such as Evangeline, Evangelina, Evita or the French Geneviève.

Evie may refer to:

== People ==
- Evie Brennan, American politician
- Evie Christie (born 1979), Canadian poet and author
- Evie Dominikovic (born 1980), an Australian tennis player
- Edith Elizabeth "Evie" Greene (1875–1917), English actress and singer
- Vina "Evie" Hayes (1912–1988), American-born actor and singer who achieved stage success in Australia
- Eva "Evie" Hone (1894–1955), Irish painter and stained glass artist
- Evanne "Evie" Hudak (born 1951), American politician
- Evie Irie (born 1998), Australian pop singer
- Evie Millynn (born 1994), New Zealand footballer
- Evie Peck, American actress and producer
- Evie Richards (born 1997), British cyclist
- Evie Tamala (born 1969), Indonesian pop and dangdut singer
- Evie (singer) Evelyn Tornquist Karlsson (born 1956), American pop and gospel singer
- Evelyn "Evie" Wyld (born 1980), Anglo-Australian author
- Evangeline "Evie" MacDonald, Australian actress, model, and transgender activist.

== Fictional characters ==
- Evie Carnahan, the female lead in 1999 movie The Mummy
- Evie Frye, a British assassin and one of the protagonists of Assassin's Creed: Syndicate
- Evie McLaren, a character in Mako: Island of Secrets, an Australian television programme
- Evie Pig, a character in Peppa Pig, a British preschool animated television series. Evie is Peppa and George's baby sister
- Evie Prior, a character in Waterloo Road, a television series
- Evie, the protagonist of the Paranormalcy novel series
- Evie, from the 2016 television series No Tomorrow
- Evie (Descendants), daughter of the Evil Queen in the 2015 film Descendants
- Evie the Mist Fairy, a character from the Rainbow Magic book franchise
- Evie, the protagonist of the video game Stellar Blade: Blood Rain
