= Eeva =

Estonian and Finnish female given name

- Gender: Female

Origin
- Region of origin: Finland, Estonia

Other names
- Related names: Eve, Eva

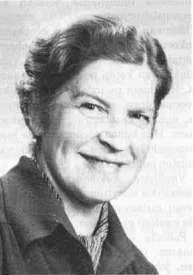
Eeva Kauppi – Member of parliament of Finland for the National Coalition Party, 1981

Eeva is a feminine given name primarily found in Finland and Estonia. It is a cognate of the English given name Eve and the Latin given name Eva. People bearing the name Eeva include:

- Eeva Esse-Sõõrumaa (born 1990), Estonian journalist
- Eeva Haimi (born 1945), Finnish sprinter
- Eeva Joenpelto (1921–2004), Finnish novelist
- Eeva Kilpi (1928–2026), Finnish writer and feminist
- Eeva Kuuskoski (born 1946), Finnish politician
- Eeva Park (born 1950), Estonian writer
- Eeva Ruoppa (1932–2013), Finnish cross-country skier
- Eeva Saarinen (born 1984), Finnish breaststroke swimmer
- Eeva Talsi (born 1988), Estonian violinist and singer
- Eeva Tikka (born 1939), Finnish writer
- Eeva Turunen (1933–2015), Finnish politician

== See also ==
- Eeva-Kaarina Aronen (1948–2015), Finnish author and journalist
- Eeva-Kaarina Volanen (1921–1999), Finnish actress
- Eeva-Liisa Manner (1921–1995), Finnish poet, playwright and translator
