= Nomis brunnealis =

Scientific classification
- Domain: Eukaryota
- Kingdom: Animalia
- Phylum: Arthropoda
- Class: Insecta
- Order: Lepidoptera
- Family: Crambidae
- Genus: Nomis
- Species: N. brunnealis

Binomial name
- Nomis brunnealis Munroe & Mutuura, 1968

Species of moth

Nomis brunnealis is a moth in the family Crambidae. It was described by Eugene G. Munroe and Akira Mutuura in 1968. It is found in Honshu, Japan.
