= Hawa (given name) =

- Gender: Arabic: Female; Atayal: Male

Origin
- Origin: Arabic: From the Arabic word for Eve

Other names
- Variant form: Hawo

Hawa is a feminine given name. In Atayal, Hawa is a male given name.

Hawa is the traditional Arabic, classical Hebrew and Swahili name for the Biblical and Qur'anic figure Eve. In Modern Hebrew the more common version is Chava.

== Notable people ==
- Hawa Abdi, Somali doctor and activist
- Hawa Abdi Samatar, former First Lady of Somalia
- Hawa Cissoko (born 1997), French footballer
- Hawa Singh, Indian boxer

== Fictional characters ==
- Hawa (哈瓦), an Atayalic character in the Taiwanese television film Batu The Iron Fist (鐵拳巴圖).

== See also ==
- Eve (name)
