= Nomis baibarensis =

Scientific classification
- Domain: Eukaryota
- Kingdom: Animalia
- Phylum: Arthropoda
- Class: Insecta
- Order: Lepidoptera
- Family: Crambidae
- Genus: Nomis
- Species: N. baibarensis

Binomial name
- Nomis baibarensis (Shibuya, 1928)

Synonyms
- Pyrausta baibarensis Shibuya, 1928

Species of moth

Nomis baibarensis is a moth in the family Crambidae. It was described by Shibuya in 1928. It is found in Taiwan.
