= Nomi (name) =

Nomi (and its variant Noomi) is a name which is used as a unisex given name and a surname. People with the name include:

== Given name ==
- Nomi Abadi, American-Egyptian Jewish pianist and actress
- Nomi Eve (born 1968), American fiction writer
- Nomi Fernandes (born 1985), Swiss model
- Nomi Kaplan (born 1933), Lithuanian-Canadian photographer
- Nomi Prins, American journalist
- Noomi Rapace (born 1979), Swedish actress
- Nomi Ruiz (born 1986), American singer, songwriter, actress, essayist and producer
- Nomi Stomphorst (born 1992), Dutch water polo player
- Nomi no Sukune (野見 宿禰), Japanese sumo wrestler
- Nomi Talisman (born 1966), Israeli-born American film director

== Surname ==
- Klaus Nomi (1944–1983), German countertenor
- Masahiko Nomi (能見 正比古; 1925–1981), Japanese journalist
- Tatsuya Nōmi (能見達也; 1969–2017), Japanese actor
- Yuji Nomi (野見 祐二; born 1958), Japanese composer
