= Nomis =

Nomis may mean:

- Nomis (company), an Australian football shoe manufacturer.
- Nomis (moth), a genus of moths
- Nomis (film), a 2018 Canadian-American thriller film also known as Night Hunter
- Nomis, a service provided by the UK Office for National Statistics providing information about the British labour market
- Stéphane Nomis (born 1970), French judoka
- Syd Nomis (born 1941), South African rugby player
