= Pels =

Pels may refer to:

== People ==
- Andries Pels (1655–1731), a Dutch banker and insurer
- Gerrit Pels (1893–1966), a Dutch astronomer
  - 1667 Pels, a main-belt asteroid
- Jessica Pels (born 1986), American magazine editor
- Pels Rijcken (1810–1889), a Royal Dutch Navy officer and politician

== Other uses ==
- New Orleans Pelicans, or "Pels", an American baseball team

== See also ==
- Pel (disambiguation)
- PEN/Laura Pels Theater Award, an award for playwrights
