= Carrie Jenkins Harris (Canadian novelist) =

Canadian novelist

Caroline Jenkins Harris
- Born: c. 1860; Nova Scotia
- Died: 1903 (aged approx. 43); Nova Scotia
- Occupation: Writer
- Writing career
- Language: English

Carrie Jenkins Harris (c. 1860 – 1903) was a 19th-century Canadian novelist who was born and lived in Nova Scotia.

== Biography ==
Harris was born some time around 1858–1860, probably to Elizabeth Vincent, and Henry Harris of Grand Pré. Both of her parents were Methodists, but she herself is recorded on the 1881 census as Anglican, and on the 1891 census as Baptist. Born on a farm in the Annapolis Valley, she was still living there with her (by then widower) father and elder brother at the time that she published her novels, even though the blurbs for her novels said that she was from Wolfville.

Harris wrote and had published five novels, four of which were printed and distributed locally by James J. Anslow of Windsor, resulting in her not gaining widespread recognition, despite her own efforts to self-publicize, including donating a copy of her first novel to the lending library run by L. Fairbanks in Halifax.

Harris died, unmarried, in 1903.

== Literary works ==
Harris' first novel, Mr Perkins, of Nova Scotia; or the European adventures of a would-be aristocrat, was published in 1891, about a character named Tom Perkins who ventures abroad from Nova Scotia to London and Paris and encounters confidence tricksters and an indifferent British aristocracy concerned only with its own interests. It was well received by the Wolfville Acadian, until, that is, the publication of her second novel, which led the Acadian to revise its opinion of the first novel downwards, claiming that the second had sophistication of invention that the first had not had. Her second novel, A romantic romance, was published in 1893 and took up themes of romantic fidelity, international travel, intelligent women, and the Gilded Age, that Harris was to continue into her final three novels. Again, the protagonists were Nova Scotians from Grand Pré who went abroad to New York and Boston, and the story is that of a romance overcoming an initial confounding caused by a false letter and a lovers' misunderstanding, ending in marriage.

Cyril Whyman's mistake, Harris' third novel, was the only one not published by Anslow. It was instead published by William Bryce of Toronto in 1894; and is the tale of two lovers from Digby, Nova Scotia whose romance is disrupted by their own weakness of character, and by deceit, who go abroad from Nova Scotia to Victoria and the Cariboo. The intricately plotted tale ends with the characters on a return visit to Digby, made newly prosperous and having entered the steam age and gained electricity.

Harris' fourth novel, Faith and friends, was published in 1895 and is the tale of two young lovers from Nova Scotia who go abroad to the West Indies and Boston before eventually reuniting years later on a river boat in America. Her fifth and final novel, A modern Evangeline, was published in 1896 and in a nod to Henry Wadsworth Longfellow's 1847 tale of Evangeline is the tragedy of one Evangeline Mortimer from Acadia who pursues her lover from Grand Pré abroad to Cape Town, finally catching up with him only to have him die in front of her. In consequence, she enters a convent to minister to the poor. In another nod, the protagonist at one point mocks how many places and things around Grand Pré are named Evangeline. English Professor W. J. Keith at the University of Toronto dismissed the book without reading it, based upon the word "modern" in the title alone, as "I very much doubt if it would seem modern to us." in a discourse on modernism in Canadian literature. It was part of a fad of tales about the Acadians in the final decades of the 19th century, that included Charles G. D. Roberts' The Forge in the Forest, Edward Payson Tenney's Constance of Acadia, Grace Dean Roger's Stories of the Land of Evangeline, and David Hickey's William and Mary: A tale of the Siege of Louisbourg.

Copies of Harris' books are rare, although they have been transcribed to microfiche and are available from the Canadian Institute for Historical Microreproductions.

== Bibliography ==
- Davies, Gwendolyn (1966). "Harris, Carrie Jenkins". In Brown, George W.; Cook, Ramsay; Hamelin, Jean (eds.). Dictionary of Canadian Biography. Vol. 13. Springer Science & Business Media. ISBN 9780802039989.
- Creelman, David (2015). "Charles G. D. Roberts' The Forge in the Forest (1896)". In Davies, Gwendolyn (ed.). Fiction Treasures by Maritime Writers: Best-selling novelists of Canadas Maritime provinces 1860–1950. Fiction Treasures. James Lorimer & Company. ISBN 9781459503779.
- Longfellow, Henry Wadsworth (1999). "Longfellow's life and works". In Paratte, Henri-Dominique (ed.). Evangeline (reprint ed.). Pelican Publishing. ISBN 9781455603916.
- Keith, W. J. (1991). "The quest for the (instant) Canadian Classic". An Independent Stance: Essays on English-Canadian Criticism and Fiction. Critical directions. Vol. 2. The Porcupine's Quill. ISBN 9780889841215.
