= Nomis albopedalis =

Scientific classification
- Domain: Eukaryota
- Kingdom: Animalia
- Phylum: Arthropoda
- Class: Insecta
- Order: Lepidoptera
- Family: Crambidae
- Genus: Nomis
- Species: N. albopedalis

Binomial name
- Nomis albopedalis Motschulsky, 1861

Synonyms
- Nomis albopedalis tomariensis Munroe & Mutuura, 1968

Species of moth

Nomis albopedalis is a moth in the family Crambidae. It was described by Victor Motschulsky in 1861. It is found on the Kuriles and Japan.
