= Evangelina Guerrero Zacarías =

Filipina poet

Evangelina Guerrero y Entrala de Zacarías (1904–1949) was a Filipina poet, short story writer and journalist in the Philippines. She edited the magazine Excelsior. Her stories and poetry were published there and in newspapers like La Opinión and La Vanguardia.

== Life ==
Evangelina Guerrero Zacarías was born on May 29, 1904, the eldest daughter of Fernando María Guerrero and Doña Remedios Entrala.

Shortly after her father died in 1929, she married Antonio Zacarías. In 1935 she won the Zóbel Prize for her poetry collection Kaleidoscopio espiritual, sharing the prize with José Reyes. In poor health after World War II, she declined the offer to make her the first female member of the Philippine Academy of the Spanish Language. She died

She was a close friend of Angela Manalang Gloria. On the 10th anniversary of her death friends joined to publish a collection of her poetry.

== Works ==
- Kaleidoscopio espiritual; colección de poesías. 1959.
- 'Cuando los Dioses Iloran' [When the Gods Cry], 1936.
- 'Como las aguas dormidas' [Like Still Waters], 1937.
