= Havva =

- Gender: Female

Origin
- Language: Biblical Hebrew > Arabic > Turkish
- Origin: Eve
- Meaning: "life"

Havva (حوا) is an Arabic, Hebrew, and Turkish given name.

The Turkish and Arabic name is form of Eve, the first woman in Abrahamic religions, and it is derived from Arabic Hawa (حواء), which in turn is loaned from Biblical Hebrew Chawwah (חוה). The Hebrew version comes from the word chavah, meaning "to breathe" or "to live."

Notable people with the name include:

- Havva Elmalı (born 2003), Turkish para athlete
- Havva Mammadova (born 1958), Azerbaijani politician
