= Eva Maler =

German born playwright

Eva Maler is a German born playwright, currently living in London.

== Career ==
Maler was producer for Black Mark for Eagle Films. Maler has appeared in various plays (including Mobile Talks) as well as a short film and several pieces of performance art. Maler was an associate with blank pages theatre company. Maler was assistant director for HuRica Productions's radio adaptation of Cleaner.

== Bibliography ==
- If I Was To Speak..., first performed as a piece of Guerilla theatre alongside London's South Bank in 2008.
- Mission Impursable.
- Shared Accommodation (co-written with Hugh Allison), filmed in 2010 by HuRica Productions.
- small worlds.
