= Evi Gkotzaridis =

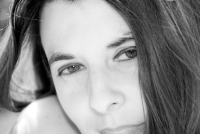
- Born: Thessaloniki, Greece
- Education: Sorbonne
- Occupations: Historian; Historiographer
- Employer(s): Universities: Sorbonne, Paris; Jagiellonian, Kraków; NUIM, Maynooth; EUI, Florence; Sabancı, Istanbul
- Notable work: Trials of Irish History A Pacifist's Life and Death
- Awards: Jean Monnet Fellowship; Irish Research Council; European Science Foundation; Marie Curie Fellowship

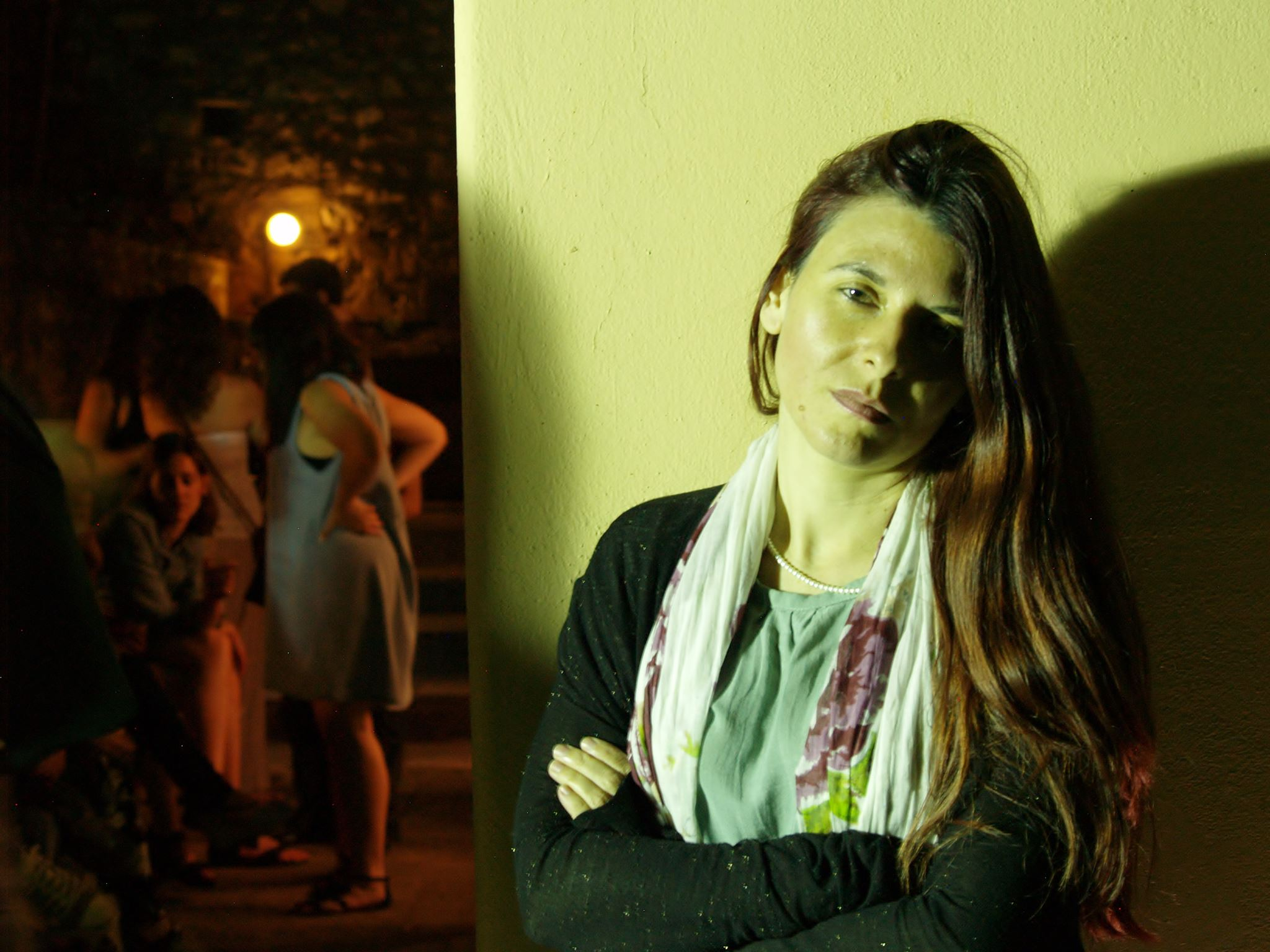

Evi Gkotzaridis is a historian whose work focuses on 20th century Irish and Greek history. Her critically acclaimed book Trials of Irish History gave the first detailed analysis of the revisionist debate in Ireland. She has also authored a book called A Pacifist's Life and Death, the first historical biography detailing the life, time and achievements of Grigorios Lambrakis. Lambrakis was an athletic champion, doctor and politician.

== Reviews ==
Scholarly reviews of Trials of Irish History were positive overall with occasional criticism of her writing style. Matthew Kelly described her book as "underpinned by a remarkable historical intelligence". Bill Kissane of the London School of Economics said the book "defends the revisionists". Brian Girvin of the University of Glasgow wrote that it was a "stimulating book on the Irish revisionist debate." David Fitzpatrick of Trinity College in Dublin described it as "quirky" but was "an exceptionally lively, generous, intelligent, wide-ranging and well-informed tribute to a much maligned but formidable lineage of historians." Martyn Powell described it as "anti-nationalistic" in tone.

== Books ==
● Η Ζωή και ο Θάνατος του Γρηγόρη Λαμπράκη. Ένας Ειρηνιστής στη Δίνη του Εμφύλιου Διχασμού από την Εύη Γκοτζαρίδη, ΚΨΜ (εκδόσεις), 2023

● A Pacifist's Life and Death: Grigorios Lambrakis and Greece in the Long Shadow of Civil War by Evi Gkotzaridis, Cambridge Scholars Publishing (publisher),2016

● Trials of Irish History: Genesis and Evolution of a Reappraisal 1938—2000 by Evi Gkotzaridis, Routledge (publisher), 2006

== Articles ==
- “Irish Revisionism and Postmodernism,” (Le révisionnisme irlandais et le postmodernisme) ETUDES IRLANDAISES, No.26:1, Spring 2001, pp. 131–57. DOI : 10.3406/irlan.2001.1561
- “Irish Revisionism and Continental Theory. An Insight into an Intellectual Kinship,”(Révisionnisme irlandais et théorie continentale. Un aperçu d'une parenté intellectuelle) THE IRISH REVIEW, Vol. 27, No. 1, Summer 2001, pp. 121–139. doi:10.2307/29736025
- “Revisionist Historians and the Modern Irish State: the Conflict between the Advisory Committee and the Bureau of Military History. 1946-1966,” (Les historiens révisionnistes et l'État irlandais moderne: le conflit entre le comité consultatif et le bureau d'histoire militaire. 1946–1966) IRISH HISTORICAL STUDIES, Vol.35, No.137, May 2006, pp. 99–116. https://doi.org/10.1017/S0021121400004661
- “Revisionism in the 20th century: Bankruptcy of a Concept and Permanence of a Practice?” (Le révisionnisme au XXe siècle : faillite d'un concept et permanence d'une pratique?) THE EUROPEAN LEGACY, Vol. 13, No. 6, October 2008, pp. 725–741. http://dx.doi.org/10.1080/10848770802358112
- “What is Behind the Concept: Fragmentation and Internal Critique in the Revisionist Debates of Greece and Ireland,” (Ce qui se cache derrière le concept : fragmentation et critique interne dans les débats révisionnistes en Grèce et en Irlande) RICERCHE STORICHE, A. XLI No.1, Jan-April 2011, pp. 87–110. http://digital.casalini.it/10.1400/169087
- “Who Will Help Me to Get Rid of this Man? Grigorios Lambrakis and the Non-Aligned Peace Movement in Post-Civil War Greece: 1961-1964,” (Qui m'aidera à me débarrasser de cet homme? Grigoris Lambrakis et le mouvement pacifiste non-aligné dans la Grèce de l'après-guerre civile : 1961–19640) JOURNAL OF MODERN GREEK STUDIES, Vol. 30, No. 2, October 2012, pp. 299–338. doi:10.1353/mgs.2012.0020“
- ‘Who Really Rules this Country': Collusion between State and Deep State in Post- Civil War Greece and the Murder of Independent MP Grigorios Lambrakis. 1958-1963,” (‘Qui dirige vraiment ce pays !’ : Collusion entre l'État officiel et l'État profond dans la Grèce de l’après-guerre civile et le meurtre du député indépendant Grigoris Lambrakis. 1958–1963) Vol. 28, No. 4, December 2017, pp. 646–673, DIPLOMACY AND STATECRAFT. DOI : 10.1080/09592296.2017.1386458
- “The 1940’s and their Afterlives. Resistance, Collaboration and the Enduring Problem of Communism,” (Les années 1940 et leurs lendemains. Résistance, collaboration et le problème persistent du communisme) in Balkan Legacies: The Long Shadow of Conflict and Ideological Experiment in Southeastern Europe, edited by Balazs Apor (TCD) & John Paul Newman (NUIM), PURDUE UNIVERSITY PRESS. Publication : 15 June 2021. http://www.thepress.purdue.edu/titles/format/9781612496405
- “Modern Irish Historiography, Politics, and Ireland’s Colonial Status,” (L'historiographie irlandaise moderne, la politique et le statut colonial de l'Irlande) in Ireland and Ukraine. Essays in Comparative History and Politics, edited by Stephen Velychenko, Joseph Ruane, & Ludmilla Hrynevych, IBIDEM/COLUMBIA UNIVERSITY PRESS. Publication: 2022. https://cup.columbia.edu/book/ireland-and-ukraine/9783838216652
