= Eva Melmuková =

Czech theologist and historian

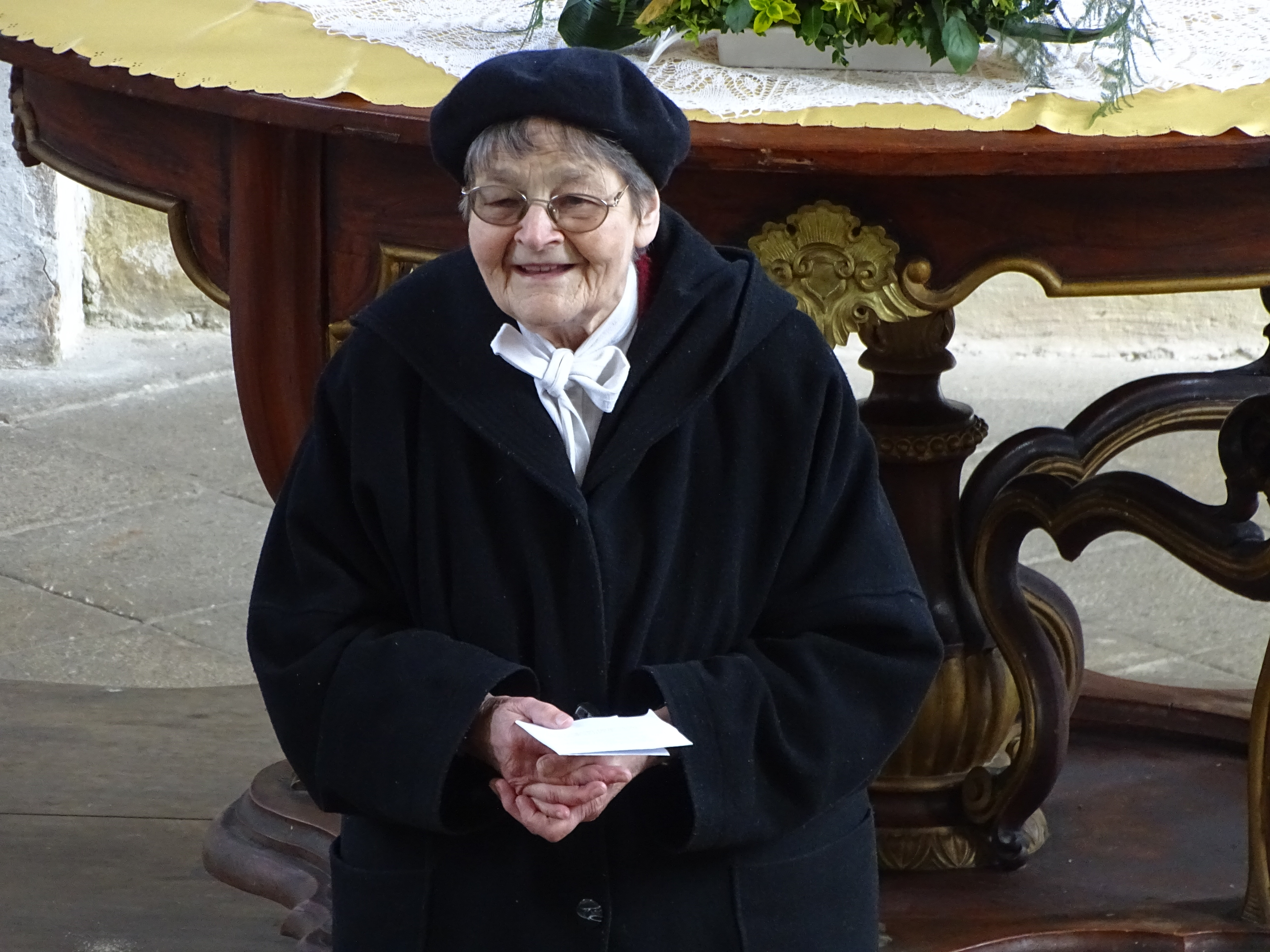
- Eva Melmuková in 2016
- Born: 25 February 1932; Rome, Italy
- Died: 5 November 2022 (aged 90); Telč, Czech Republic
- Occupations: Lutheran theologist, historian

Eva Romana Melmuková (née Šašecí; 25 February 1932 – 5 November 2022) was a Czech Lutheran theologian and historian.

== Biography ==
She was born in Rome, where her father was posted as a representative of Czechoslovakia to International Institute of Agriculture. Her parents suffered from multiple miscarriages and still-births prior to her birth, hence they considered the birth of a living child "a miracle". The baby was, nonetheless, weak and the family was advised by doctors to leave Rome as soon as possible as the baby coped poorly with Mediterranean climate. In December 1932, the family returned to their home country, first to Jihlava and later to Prague.

Melmuková studied at Jan Neruda Grammar School in Prague. Following her graduation in 1950, she studied at the Evangelical Theology faculty of Charles University as well as the Faculty of Art. She graduated in theology in 1954. After graduation, she became the vicar of the Smíchov of Prague.

In 1957 her father was arrested and later convicted in a show trial. Melmuková was unable to continue to work as a cleric and for nearly 30 years she worked various odd jobs. She even had to study high school again, graduating in 1961. Although the regime tried to force her to work as an informant by threatening to keep her father in jail despite his ill health, she refused to fulfill assigned tasks.

In 1986 she was again allowed to return to her clerical work. In 1989 she was among the founders of Civic Forum opposition party in Telč, where her family originally came from and where she lived the last years of her life. She won the first free mayoral election in Telč in 1990, but refused to become the mayor, preferring to only be a part of town council and focus on her research and teaching.

From 1990 to 1995 she taught church history at the Charles University. In addition to religion, she was interested in the 17th and 18th century Czech history, urbanization and folk architecture.
