= Eva Matsuzaki =

Latvian-born Canadian architect (born 1944)

- Born: Eva Pūpols; February 27, 1944 (age 82); Riga, Latvia
- Education: Cornell University
- Occupation: Architect
- Spouse: Kiyoshi Matsuzaki
- Children: 2

Eva Matsuzaki (born Eva Pūpols on 27 February 1944) is a retired architect and first former female president of the Royal Architectural Institute of Canada (RAIC). Eva immigrated from Latvia to the United States and later developed her career living in Vancouver, Canada. In 1998, she established her own firm known as Matsuzaki Architects along with her husband, Kiyoshi Matsuzaki. Eva Matsuzaki is a founding member of Vancouver's women in architecture support network and is involved in environmentally sensitive and sustainable building design.

== Early life and education ==
Eva Pūpols was born on 27 February 1944, in Riga, Latvia, that at the time was occupied by Nazi Germany, and she later immigrated to New York City, USA with her family at the age of 5. She wanted to create architecture as early as ten years old. She would stay up late at night and redesign houses and building plans that were featured in magazines. Eva attended Cornell University and graduated with a Bachelor of Architecture degree in 1966. She was one of two women in a graduating class of 40 students.

Through her career, Eva met her late husband and fellow architect, Kiyoshi Matsuzaki. Eva and Kiyoshi met at the coffee machine while both worked at Kevin Roche John Dinkeloo & Associates and were married in 1970. Kiyoshi was a Japanese-Canadian architect, former president of the Royal Architectural Institute of Canada (RAIC) and former council member of the Architectural Institute of British Columbia. Eva and Kiyoshi moved to Vancouver, British Columbia, in 1972 where they worked together for the remainder of their architectural careers. In 2010, Kiyoshi was diagnosed with pancreatic cancer and died in 2012. Eva and Kiyoshi have two children, Tessa and Martin.

== Career ==
After graduating from Cornell University with a Bachelor of Architecture, Eva worked in the office of Kevin Roche John Dinkeloo & Associates in Hamden, Connecticut, between 1966–1972. She became job architect for the Irwin Union National Bank located in Columbus, Indiana and the Lehman Pavilion at the Metropolitan Museum of Art in New York City. Eva then worked with architectural firm McCarter Nairne, between 1972–1974.

Eva worked for Arthur Erickson Architects from 1974–1984 with husband Kiyoshi Matsuzaki. At Arthur Erickson, she was the design coordinator for the Provincial Government Office Building and the Courthouse Complex in Vancouver (also known as Robson Square). Eva also became Project Architect for the Government of Canada Building, a condominium in West Vancouver and a mixed-use condominium in Whistler, British Columbia.

Eva and Kiyoshi partnered with architect Jim Wright to form Matsuzaki Wright Architects, later renamed Matsuzaki Architects Inc. Eva Matsuzaki worked as a supplementary professor at the school of architecture at the University of British Columbia and was a design critic, tutorial leader and mentor. She also became the chairwoman of Vancouver's urban design panel. Eva was the president of the Canadian architectural certification board and the Canada Line Board, chairwoman of the Architectural Institute of British Columbia (AIBC) examining board, and a member of the AIBC council. Matsuzaki served as a regional representative for British Columbia and the Yukon, RAIC first vice-president, and chairwoman of the institute's awards task force.

She became the first female president of the Royal Architectural Institute of Canada (RAIC) at the 1998 festival of architecture in Regina, serving for one year. Matsuzaki is currently a member of the Board of Callanish Society, which is a support group for people surviving with cancer.

=== Architecture firm ===
In 1984, Eva and Kiyoshi Matsuzaki partnered with architect Jim Wright to form Matsuzaki Wright Architects. In 1998, the firm was renamed Matsuzaki Architects Inc. Matsuzaki Wright Architects are known for a portfolio of works in a mid-century modern style, and for creating benchmarks in the emerging field of sustainable design. Matsuzaki has followed two themes throughout her practice: a thoughtful approach to environmentally-sensitive design and a commitment to the architectural and larger community.

== Notable projects ==
=== C.K. Choi Building at the University of British Columbia (Matsuzaki Wright Architects, completed 1996) ===
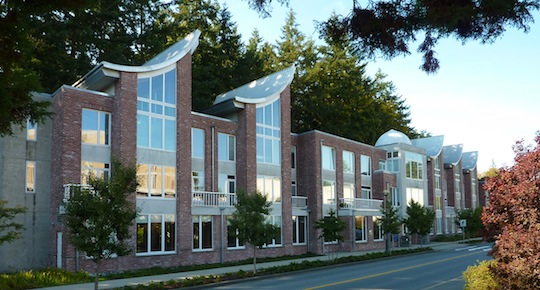
C.K. Choi Building Exterior

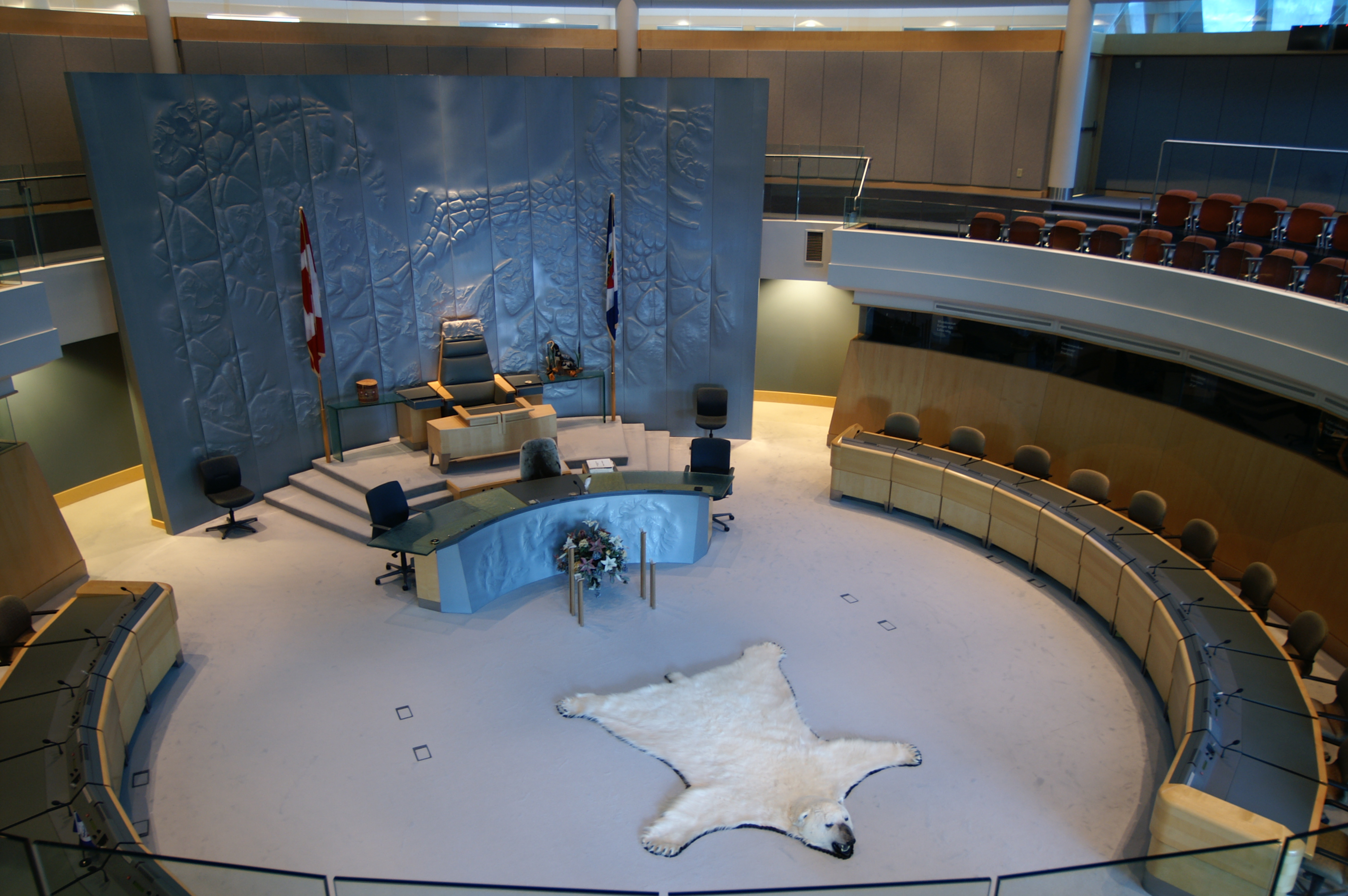
Interior view of the drum-shaped chamber - Legislative Assembly of Northwest Territories

The C.K. Choi Building was one of the first "green" institutional buildings in Canada with environmental features such as composting toilets, natural light and 50 per cent recycled building materials. Matsuzaki Wright Architects completed the structure, which includes 30,000 square feet and three storeys of offices, a display gallery and teaching spaces. Architecture professor Ray Cole from the University of British Columbia worked directly with the firm to advise on the sustainability aspects of the project. The building uses curved roofs and brick construction influenced by Asian and Neoclassical architecture.

=== Legislative Assembly of the Northwest Territories (Ferguson Simek Clark/Pin Matthews in association with Matsuzaki Wright Architects, completed 1993) ===
Located in Yellowknife in the Northwest Territories, the design connects the building to its natural surroundings. Administrative offices wrap around a drum-shaped chamber while there is a large great hall that also serves as a communal gathering space. The great hall is flooded with natural light. The building entails minimal intervention into the natural landscape and features native plants, such as sedges and grasses to preserve the biodiversity. The exterior walls are clad in glass and zinc panels. The use of zinc references the large zinc mines that provide employment for the nearby community.

=== Les Terraces (Matsuzaki Wright Architects, completed 1992) ===
Les Terraces is a luxury condominium tower located on Bellevue Avenue in West Vancouver, British Columbia. Eva spent several years working as one of Arthur Erickson's main architectural designers and this apartment tower displays many key influences and connections to his work. It consists of one residential unit per floor and stepped terraces to create unobstructed views that are oriented towards the sea. The material palette of the design incorporates residual concrete brutalism with combinations of brickwork. The design was awarded the BC Lieutenant-Governor's Medal in Architecture in 1992.

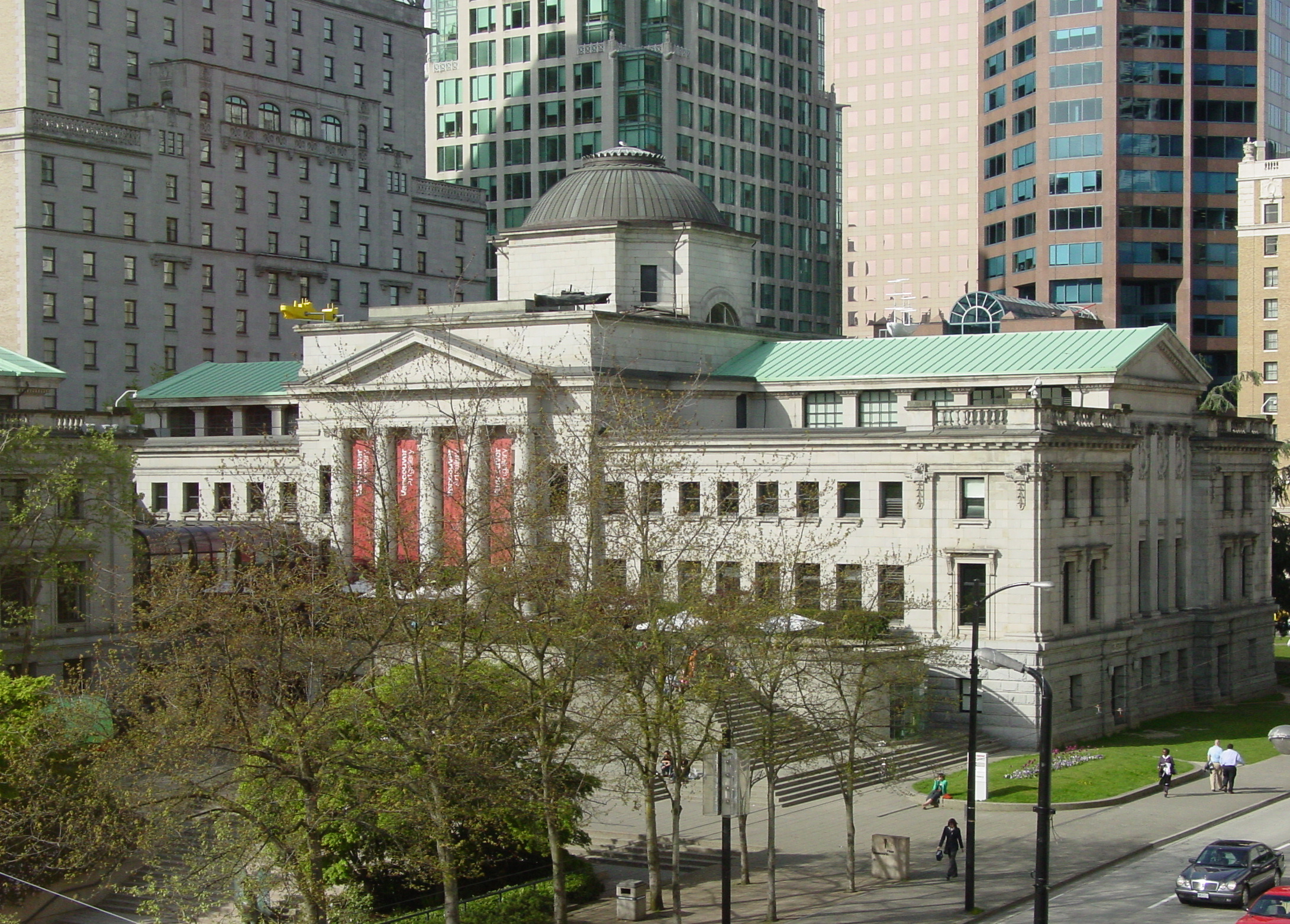
Vancouver Art Gallery Exterior

=== Vancouver Art Gallery (Arthur Erickson Architects, completed 1983) ===
In 1974, Arthur Erickson performed a feasibility study on the building that was once the Vancouver Courthouse, to improve the usage of the building for the growing city. After extensive designs and renovations to the old courthouse, Arthur Erickson Architects opened the Vancouver Art Gallery. Eva Matsuzaki was an architect with Erickson's firm, and was a project supervisor for the courthouse renovations.

=== Lehman Pavilion (Kevin Roche John Dinkeloo and Associates, completed 1975) ===
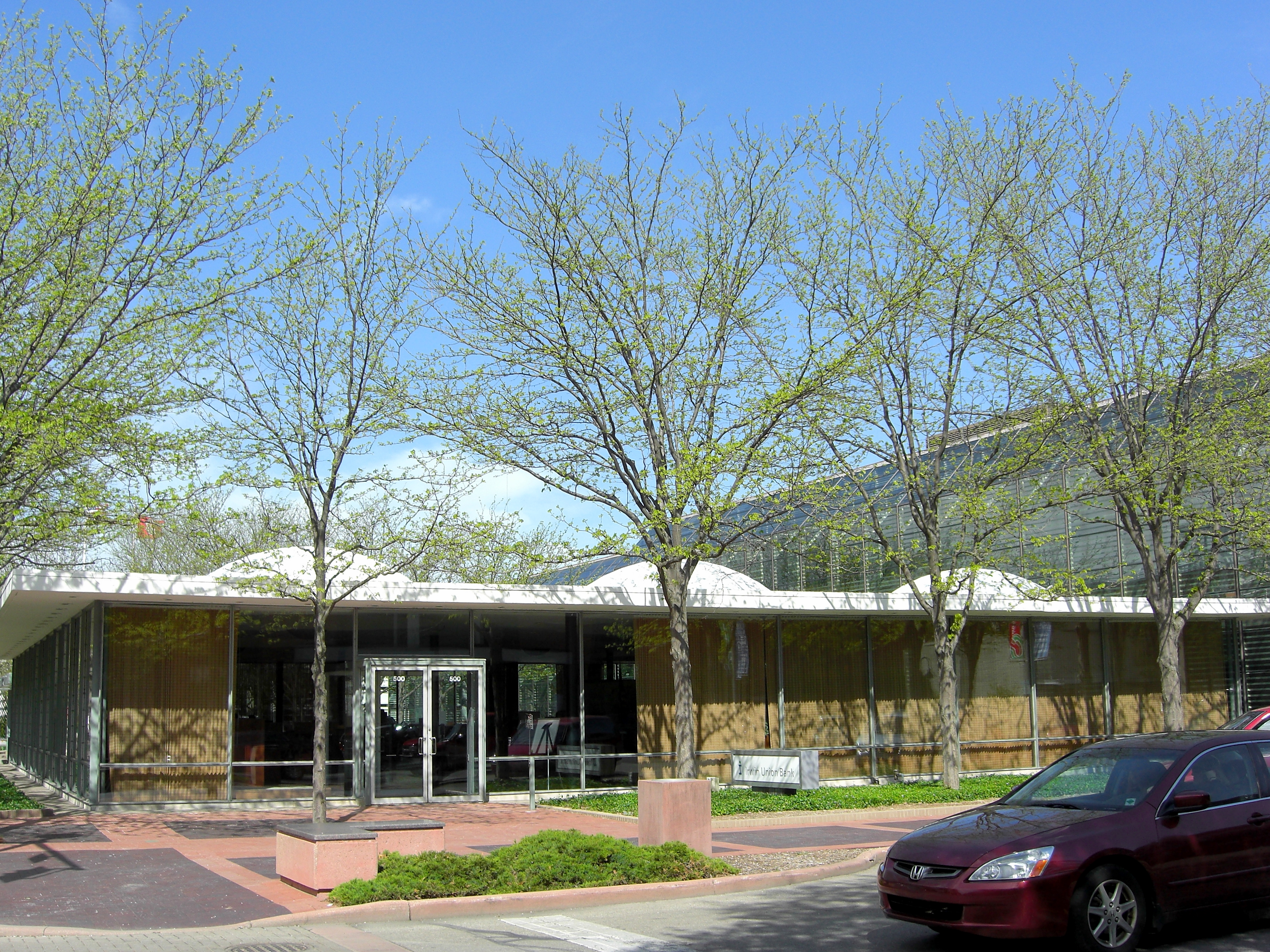
Irwin Union Bank Exterior

The Lehman Pavilion was the first extension to the Metropolitan Museum of Art in New York City. It is a sunken space with a central skylit gallery surrounded by a series of rooms and displays the Robert Lehman Collection. The collection includes seven hundred years of western European art, from the fourteenth to the twentieth centuries and includes paintings, drawings, manuscript illumination, sculpture and glass.

=== Irwin Union Bank (Eero Saarinen, Kevin Roche John Dinkeloo and Associates, completed 1973) ===
The Irwin Union Bank, currently known as the Irwin Conference Center, was constructed in Columbus, Indiana. The original building was a one-storey structure designed by Eero Saarinen in 1954. Kevin Roche John Dinkeloo & Associates created a larger addition in 1973. Eva Matsuzaki was job architect for the 1973 addition when she was working in the firm of Kevin Roche John Dinkeloo and Associates.

== Awards and accomplishments ==
Architectural Awards
Year	Category	Description	Ref(s)
2000	Vancouver YWCA Women of Distinction Winner	Management, The Professions & Trades	
2000	American Institute of Architects, Top Ten, Earth Day	Given for the C.K. Choi Building	
	Royal Architectural Institute of Canada, Millenium Celebration of Canadian Architecture	Given for the C.K. Choi Building	
1998	Architectural Institute of British Columbia Innovative Design - Award of Excellence	Given to the C.K. Choi Building	
	International Resource Award	Awarded in Seattle, Best Building Award for C.K. Choi Building	
	BOMO (Building Owners and Managers Association) initial Earth Award of Excellence	Given for the C.K. Choi Building	
	British Columbia Hydro power Smart Award of Excellence	Given for New Institutional Building to the C.K. Choi Building	
	British Columbia Hydro Power Smart Award of Excellence	Given to a Large Commercial Building to the Frased Valley Credit Union Headquarters	
	Architectural Institute of British Columbia - Award of Excellence	Given for Les Terraces Condominiums	
	Canadian Architect Magazine, Award of Excellence	Given for Les Terraces Condominiums	
