= Nomis (moth) =

Scientific classification
- Domain: Eukaryota
- Kingdom: Animalia
- Phylum: Arthropoda
- Class: Insecta
- Order: Lepidoptera
- Family: Crambidae
- Subfamily: Pyraustinae
- Genus: Nomis; Motschulsky, 1861

Genus of moths

Nomis is a genus of moths of the family Crambidae.

== Species ==
- Nomis albopedalis Motschulsky, 1861
- Nomis baibarensis (Shibuya, 1928)
- Nomis brunnealis Munroe & Mutuura, 1968
