= Evangeline (song) =

Single by Cocteau Twins

from the album Four-Calendar Café
- Released: 20 September 1993
- Studio: September Sound, London
- Genre: Dream pop
- Length: 4:29
- Label: Fontana
- Producer: Cocteau Twins

Cocteau Twins singles chronology
"Iceblink Luck" (1990)	"Evangeline" (1993)	"Snow" (1993)

Evangeline is a 1993 single by Scottish alternative rock band Cocteau Twins. It was recorded and mixed at September Sound in London, and released in September 1993 by record label Fontana. The song, written by group members Elizabeth Fraser, Robin Guthrie and Simon Raymonde, was a moderate hit in several countries and very popular in Portugal. It was included on the band's seventh studio album, Four-Calendar Café (1993). The accompanying music video for "Evangeline" was directed by German film director Nico Beyer.

== Critical reception ==
Jason Ankeny from AllMusic stated that songs like "Evangeline" "continue the trio's advance into more accessible melodic and lyrical ground without sacrificing even an ounce of their trademark ethereality." Josef Woodard from Entertainment Weekly felt it have "an otherworldly shimmer, a mode perfected by these early architects of dream pop." David Beran from the Gavin Report wrote, "Headphones are a must for this sonic picnic and first single from the upcoming album. Drop into background landscapes of milky way-out keyboards and slivers of airy guitar. Oh, did I mention that the foreground vocals are patent 'Teau Twin ringlets of bliss?" He added that the song "slowly plunges as Frazer's voice soars into a firmament crowded with spacey snippets of computerized sound." Chuck Campbell from Knoxville News-Sentinel described the "gorgeous strains" as "typical Cocteau Twins triumphs, aural massages of magical quality." He also noted that the instruments supply "an air of dreamy melancholia that both chills and warms." A reviewer from Lennox Herald complimented it as "a fine effort".

Peter Paphides from Melody Maker remarked Fraser, "seemingly concussed by the heartbreak, harmonising with herself on the chorus". American Musician remarked the song's "sly pop appeal", adding that "the candyland blur of the Cocteaus' sound has never been so alluring". Martin Aston from Music Week declared it as "a slow, stately affair with all their charm and melodic ingenuity intact." R.S. Murthi from New Straits Times felt that a song like "Evangeline" "evince concerns that go beyond the ordinary. And the combination of surreal verbal imagery and atmospheric music makes for an engaging mystique." Stuart Bailie from NME found that "it has the kind of cheesy drum fills and forlorn arpeggios that would sound at home on a Des O'Connor record." Ted Drozdowski from Rolling Stone wrote that it "ride gentle guitar-bass-drums grooves that allow Fraser to insinuate her phrases into choruses based on memorable melodies that pack a sweet-tooth rush." Alec Foege from Spin magazine named it one of the album's three most successful songs, noting that it "swells with the effects-treated grandeur of Simon Raymonde and Robin Guthrie's accompaniment". In his book The Da Capo Companion to 20th-century Popular Music, Phil Hardy described it as "dreamy". Weisbard and Marks wrote in their Spin Alternative Record Guide, that it is "a song so adult-sounding it could have come from Prefab Sprout."

Professional ratings
Review scores
Source	Rating
AllMusic	3/5 stars

== Track listings ==
All tracks are written by Cocteau Twins (Elizabeth Fraser, Robin Guthrie, Simon Raymonde).

No.	Title	Length
1.	"Evangeline"	4:29
2.	"Mud and Dark"	3:43

12-inch vinyl release
No.	Title	Length
1.	"Evangeline"	4:29
2.	"Mud and Dark"	3:43
3.	"Summer-blink"	3:09

September 1993 CD release
No.	Title	Length
1.	"Evangeline"	4:29
2.	"Mud and Dark"	3:43
3.	"Summer-blink"	3:09

== Personnel ==
Cocteau Twins

- Elizabeth Fraser – vocals
- Robin Guthrie – guitar, drum machine
- Simon Raymonde – bass guitar

Production

- Additional engineer – Lincoln Fong
- Original photography – Walter Wick
- Writer, composer and producer – Cocteau Twins

== Charts ==
Chart performance for "Evangeline"
Chart (1993)	Peak position
Australia (ARIA)	135
Europe (Eurochart Hot 100)	89
Portugal (AFP)	4
UK Singles (OCC)	34
UK Airplay (ERA)	70
