= Eva Poveda =

- Poveda in 2024
- Born: 22 July 1975 (age 51); Spain
- Education: USC
- Employer: Galician Healthcare Service

Eva Poveda López (born 22 July 1975) is a Spanish scientist who is a researcher at the Galician Healthcare Service (SERGAS), and coordinates the Consolidated Research Group on Virology and Pathogenesis at the Galicia Sur Health Research Institute, and has been the Scientific Director of the IIS Galicia Sur since 18 July 2022. She is a virologist and is considered an expert in the study of Human Immunodeficiency Virus (HIV) infection and viral hepatitis, and since April 2020 has expanded her research to include SARS-CoV-2/COVID-19 infection. Poveda has been a member of the Galician Government's Advisory Council for Research, Development and Innovation since 2016.

Poveda is the author of 197 articles published in international scientific journals with an h-index of 40. She leads national and international projects, primarily in Europe, the United States, and West Africa. Her research focuses on the epidemiological, clinical, virological, and pathogenic aspects of these infections. She has conducted research stays at Case Western Reserve University in the Laboratory of Interesting Immunology, directed by Michael Lederman. Since 2008, she has been a recipient of funding for research projects, human resources, mobility, and networks (principal investigator of the AIDS Research Network-RIS, RD16). Poveda is a member of the executive committee of the Adult Cohort of the National HIV/AIDS Network (CoRIS) and is the scientific coordinator and principal investigator of the IIS Galicia Sur COVID19 Cohort created in April 2020 with funding obtained from the ISCIII COVID19 Fund and which is part of the ISCIII-COVID19 Registry.

Poveda is a member of expert panels for the development of clinical guidelines and national consensus documents for the treatment and clinical follow-up of people living with HIV, such as the GESIDA/National AIDS Plan Consensus Document regarding antiretroviral treatment in HIV-infected adults, the document on the clinical utility of antiretroviral resistance, and coordinator of the Antiretroviral Resistance Guide of the AIDS Research Network, among others. She participates in scientific and organizing committees of national congresses and scientific meetings (GeSIDA National Congress) and is an editor (Microorganisms, Frontiers in Immunology, Pathogens and Immunity) and reviewer for international scientific journals.

In October 2025, she was appointed a member of the R&D Advisory Council of the Xunta de Galicia. which met for the first time for its constitution on 16 April 2026.

== Education ==
Poveda holds a degree in Biological Sciences from the University of Santiago de Compostela (USC, 1998), a master's degree in Molecular Biology from the Severo Ochoa Molecular Biology Center in Madrid, a master's degree in AIDS from the Complutense University of Madrid (2003), and a PhD in Medical Microbiology from the Complutense University of Madrid (UCM) (2004).

== Career ==
Her scientific career has been recognized and awarded the 2012 L'Oréal-UNESCO Research Award for Women in Science in recognition of the excellence of her scientific work in the field of Life Sciences. Her research has also been recognized in five editions of the Research Awards on HIV and other infections from the Galician Ministry of Health.

Her involvement and active participation in science outreach and culture activities stands out, aiming to disseminate knowledge to the public and promote the visibility of women in science, as well as the advancement of new generations of researchers. She has participated in various projects funded by FECYT, such as Biomedicine with and for Society, and HIV Open Science, and has coordinated INIBIC's participation in the Science in the Street Day in A Coruña on several occasions. he participates in and promotes various activities every 11 February (International Day of Women and Girls in Science), and has been involved in science outreach initiatives (Naukas, Coruña Curiosa) and initiatives to increase the visibility of women in science, such as "Ciencia Sin Sombrero". She is the Founder and editor of the HIV&Co Science Communication Platform.

Poveda accepted the ASOMEGA Gold Badge on behalf of the IIS Galicia Sur, in recognition of the institute's work in generating scientific knowledge to improve the health of society.
