= Eva Amador Guillén =

Spanish politician (born 1957)

Member of the Congress of Deputies (Spain)
- In office 1993–2000
- Constituency: Valencia

Delegate of the Generalitat Valenciana to the Central Government
- In office 2000–2005

Director General of Relationships between the Generalitat and the Central Government
- Incumbent
- Assumed office November 2005

Personal details
- Born: 1957 (age 68–69) Torrent, Valencia Province, Spain
- Party: People's Party
- Spouse: Married
- Children: 3
- Occupation: Politician, IT Professional

Eva Amador Guillén (Torrent, Valencia Province, 1957) is a Spanish politician who belongs to the People's Party (PP).

Married with three children, Amador qualified in information technology. She entered politics in 1991 when she was elected local councillor for her hometown of Torrent.

In 1993 she was elected to the Spanish Congress of Deputies representing Valencia region. She was re-elected in 1996 but did not stand at the 2000 election. In 2000 she was appointed delegate for the Generalitat Valenciana, the Valencian regional administration, to the central government. She then became director general of relationships between the Generalitat and the central government in November 2005.
