= Eva Horváthová =

Slovak physician and politician

Member of the National Council
- Incumbent
- Assumed office 4 April 2012

Personal details
- Born: 29 December 1974 (age 51)
- Party: Ordinary People and Independent Personalities
- Children: 3

Eva Horváthová (née Eva Mitterpachová, born 29 December 1974) is a Slovak physician and politician. She has served as a Member of the National Council for the Ordinary People and Independent Personalities party since 2012.

Horváthová teaches at the Slovak Medical University.

Horváthová is married and has three children.
