= Eva Polttila =

Finnish television news anchor

Eva Polttila (born April 1, 1946) is a retired Finnish television news anchor. She worked in YLE from 1969 to 2009. In television news she started in 1981 and at the time she was the first woman to read news regularly in Finland. Polttila is one of the most famous news anchors in Finland and she was given the title "the most reliable woman in Finland" when her long-time colleague Arvi Lind retired in 2003.

== Personal life ==
Polttila was born and grew up in Helsinki. Her mother was the writer Brita Polttila, who was of Saint Petersburg -born of German-Polish and English origin. Brita married poet Arvo Turtiainen in 1953.

Eva Polttila is married to a retired journalist of economics Juhani Ikonen. In her spare time Polttila does gymnastic exercise and Nordic walking and she has also worked as an ambassador of motion in the Suomi liikkeelle -campaign.

Eva Polttila announced on September 1, 2009, the 50th anniversary of the first YLE TV News broadcast, that she will retire at the end of September. Her last news broadcast was on September 29, 2009, at 20.30 EEST.

== Prizes ==
Eva Polttila was given the journalist prize of the republic of Finland in 2008. Polttila is also a four-time winner of Telvis.
