= Eva Habil =

Egyptian lawyer and politician

Eva Habil (Arabic: إيفا هابيل) is an Egyptian lawyer and politician. In 2008, she became Egypt's first female mayor when she was appointed mayor of Kom Buha, a town of Upper-Egypt with a population of about 10,000. She was chosen over five male candidates, including her brother.

Habil was born in Kom Buha. Like most of the village residents, she is a Coptic Christian. Her father was the mayor there until 2002. She studied at Ain Shams University, practiced law in Cairo, and was a member of the National Democratic Party.
