= Evangeline (1999 musical) =

- Concept Album
- Music: Paul Taranto
- Lyrics: Paul Taranto; Jamie Wax
- Book: Jamie Wax
- Basis: Henry Wadsworth Longfellow's 1847 epic poem Evangeline
- Productions: 1998 Episcopal school of Baton Rouge; 1999 Louisiana State University; 1999 Lafayette concert 1999 Shreveport concert 2000 PBS

Evangeline is a musical with a book by Jamie Wax, lyrics by Wax and Paul Taranto, and music by Paul Taranto.

Peopled by characters introduced by Henry Wadsworth Longfellow in his 1847 epic poem of the same name, it tells the tale of Evangeline Bellefontaine and Gabriel Lajeunesse, born on the same mid-18th century day in the Acadian village of Grand-Pré in Nova Scotia. The two forge a bond that strengthens as they grow older, and they eventually become engaged. Their lives are disrupted when they are separated by British soldiers who invade the community and disperse the residents among the American colonies. Evangeline's search for her fiancé takes her on a long journey from the New England seacoast to the Louisiana bayous, where she settles in St. Martin and faithfully waits for the arrival of her beloved. Years later she joins local priest Father Felician to assist him in his ministrations to the still-homeless Acadians roaming along the Atlantic seabord, a fateful move that unexpectedly brings her closer to her destiny.

In 1995, inspired by a children's theatre production about the Acadian expulsion, music teacher Paul Taranto began working on a musical adaptation of the story. Three years later, he approached actor/playwright/lyricist Wax with a collection of songs he had written and asked if he would be interested in collaborating on the project. Unable to commit himself at the time, he recommended Taranto work with mutual friend Danny Tiberghein, who taught at the same school and had a theatrical background. When Tiberghein was later killed, Wax agreed to complete the musical with Taranto as a memorial to him.

== Production history ==
In November 1998, Evangeline was presented in concert form at the Episcopal High School (Baton Rouge, Louisiana). The reaction was favorable enough for the creative team to pool their resources and finance the recording of a concept album.

The first full-scale production of the show, directed by Paige Parsons-Gagliano (then Parsons-Wax), was mounted at Louisiana State University in 1999. Taranto conducted the orchestra, and Wax played one of the secondary roles. Two months later, there were two concert performances, one in Lafayette and the other at the Strand Theatre in Shreveport. The latter was taped by Louisiana Public Broadcasting and, in October 2000, aired on PBS stations throughout the United States and Canada. The PBS production starred Ana Maria Andricain as Evangeline, Rod Weber as Gabriel, and Andre Chapoy as Father Felician, backed by the Centenary College Choir, the Texas Street Singers, and the Children's Choir of the Episcopal School of Baton Rouge.

Evangeline was staged at the Baton Rouge Little Theatre in 2004. It was directed by Paige Parsons Gagliano, while composer Paul Taranto was musical director. Andre Chapoy appeared once more as Father Felician. In February 2011, the musical received full-scale production at the Manship Theatre in Baton Rouge, Louisiana, presented by the Dunham School's Theatre Department and directed again by Gagliano. Judy Snow acted as musical director while Lisa Hooks-Murray was the show's choreographer. Evangeline was played by Mary Elizabeth Drake, and Gabriel by Roston Jarrell. Father Felician was played by Quinn Miller.

The show was staged at Theatre Baton Rouge in the fall of 2016, directed by Gagliano, with music direction by Taranto and choreography by Christine Chrest. Bailey Purvis played the title character.

For the show's 20th anniversary it was performed at Episcopal High School (Baton Rouge, Louisiana). Paige Gagliano directed and Paul Taranto was musical director before retiring from his long-held position as the school's band teacher. Christine Chrest again acted as choreographer and the school's choir teacher Carter Smith featured as Father Felician. Starring two casts of students, the successful two week run of the show brought in former cast members to celebrate the shows history and the work of Paul Taranto.

== Synopsis ==
In the French-Acadian village of Grand-Pre in Nova Scotia, it is the middle of the eighteenth century. The priest, Father Felician, announces that two children were born the same morning: Gabriel Lajeunesse and Evangeline Bellefontaine, both delivered by midwife Madame Hebert. The two children grow up together under the occupation of British troops. Eventually Gabriel proposes marriage to Evangeline. Her free-spirited friend, Praline, is unhappy about this. On the day before the wedding, the British force the Acadians from their homes and burn the village.

To end the Acadians' opposition to the British, they are forced to disperse among the American colonies. Evangeline and Gabriel become separated, but they vow to stay faithful until they can find one another. Evangeline's search, with Father Felician, takes her from New England to St. Martin in the Louisiana territory. For years, she watches for Gabriel's return, while everyone tells her to move on with her life. Praline, now wealthy and widowed, visits and urges Evangeline to join her to live a life of luxury and excitement in New Orleans, but Evangeline declines.

She leaves with Father Felician to bring medical aid to the still-homeless Acadians along the Atlantic coast. In a hospital in Canada near Grand-Pre, she finally sees Gabriel, who has been surviving as a trapper, but he is dying of a fever. He dies in her arms, declaring his love and faithfulness to her. She confirms to Father Felician that this brief reunion was worth all she had given, her entire life, and nothing less.

== Song list ==
Act I

- Prologue: The Forest Primeval
- The Village of Grand Pré
- The Game of Life
- Someday
- A Sort-of Friend
- If I Know Boys
- To Our Memories
- My Guardian
- Father Forgive Them
- Act One Finale

Act II

- Starting Again
- Blessed Lady
- Worth the Wait
- Matt from Ville Platte
- Common Ground
- There Are Days
- If I Know Men
- Trust Your Heart
- Someday (reprise)
- Epilogue
- Worth the Wait (solo version)
