= Evangeline Rachel Hall =

American educator

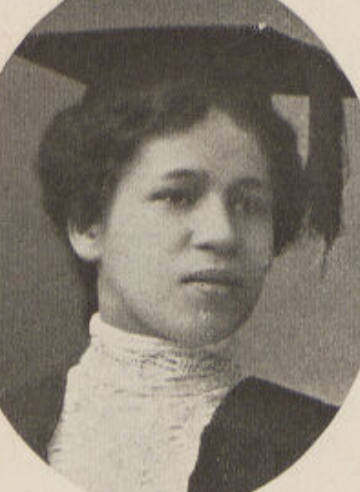
- Evangeline Rachel Hall, from the 1905 yearbook of Radcliffe College
- Born: August 18, 1882; Cambridge, Massachusetts, U.S.
- Died: November 30, 1947 (age 65); Wilmington, Delaware, U.S.
- Occupation: Educator

Evangeline Rachel Hall (August 18, 1882 – November 30, 1947) was an American educator. She was head of teacher training at Cheyney State Teachers College, where she taught for 42 years, from 1905 to 1947.

== Early life and education ==
Hall was born in Cambridge, Massachusetts, the daughter of Charles H. Hall and Ophelia Ann Hall. Her father was born in Georgia and her mother was born in Mississippi. She graduated from Radcliffe College in 1905. She was the third African-American graduate of Radcliffe. She earned a master's degree in education at Harvard University in 1929. She attended a summer school program at New York University in 1931.

== Career ==
Hall taught math, English and education classes at Cheyney State Teachers College in Pennsylvania for 42 years. She was also director of the Coppin Laboratory Practice School, and a leader of the Cheyney Community League, the school's outreach program. Bayard Rustin was one of the Cheyney students Hall knew during her career.

In addition to their teaching duties, Hall and her colleague Laura Wheeler Waring were co-editors of the campus newspaper, The Cheyney Record, beginning in 1918. They traveled together in Europe for the summer of 1929. Waring painted a portrait of Hall in about 1930.

Hall was corresponding secretary of the Pennsylvania State Negro Council, in the council's leadership at the same time as Addie Whiteman Dickerson and Leslie Pinckney Hill. She was a charter member of the Omega Omega chapter of Alpha Kappa Alpha sorority.

== Personal life and legacy ==
Hall died in 1947, at the age of 65, in Wilmington, Delaware. In 1975, the Evangeline Rachel Hall Education Center was built on the Cheyney State campus; it was demolished in 2003.
