= Eva Gothlin =

Swedish historian of ideas (1957–2006)

Eva Gothlin (26 January 1957 – 22 December 2006) was a Swedish historian of ideas.

== Biography ==
Eva Lundgren was born on 26 January 1957 in Norrköping.

Gothlin defended her thesis on the history of ideas at the University of Gothenburg in 1991 with the dissertation Kön och existens: studier i Simone de Beauvoirs Le Deuxième Sexe ("Gender and Existence: studies in Simone de Beauvoir's Le Deuxième Sexe") (Gothenburg, 1991). In 1998, she became the first director of the then newly-formed National Secretariat for Gender Research. In 2001, she became an Associate Professor of History of Ideas. From 2004 until her death, she was a senior lecturer at the Department of Gender Studies at the University of Gothenburg.

Gothlin was a leading Simone de Beauvoir researcher, attracting attention both in Sweden and internationally. Her dissertation was translated into English in 1996 and French in 2001. She also wrote more comprehensive texts on gender science and feminist theory, including the scripture Kön eller genus? ("Sex or Gender?", 1999) used in university courses in gender science. From 2000, Gothlin worked with a research project that analyzed the history of ideas "how friendship between woman and man was portrayed and conceptualized in Western history of ideas".

She was married to the artist Hans Gothlin, with whom she had two children. She died on 22 December 2006 in Gothenburg.

== Selected works ==
- Kön och existens, studier i Simone de Beauvoirs 'Le Deuxième Sexe', Göteborg, Daidalos, 1991. [Diss. Göteborg : Univ.]
- "Simone de Beauvoir och Jean-Paul Sartre : kön och etik" In: Från moderna helgonkulter till självmord / redaktör: Thomas Kaiserfeld. Stockholm : Avd. för teknik- och vetenskapshistoria, Tekniska högsk. 1995. S. 181–190. [Stockholm papers in history and philosophy of technology,]
- "Gender and ethics in the philosophy of Simone de Beauvoir". NORA, 3:1, 1995, pp. 3–13.
- Sex & Existence: Simone de Beauvoir's 'The Second Sex'. London: Athlone. 1996.
- "Simone de Beauvoir". In: Routledge Encyclopedia of Philosophy, New York, London: Routledge. 1998.
- "The master-slave dialectic in The Second Sex" I: Simone de Beauvoir: A Critical Reader / Ed.: Elizabeth Fallaize. New York, London: Routledge. 1998.
- Kön eller genus. Nationella sekretariatet för genusforsknings skriftserie. Göteborg, 2000.
- "Vänskap mellan kvinna och man – en filosofisk sällsamhet". In: Sett och hört : en vänskrift tillägnad Kerstin Nordenstam på 65-årsdagen. Göteborg: Institutionen för svenska språket, Univ., 2000.
- Sexe et existence: la philosophie de Simone de Beauvoir. Paris: Michalon. 2001.
- "Förord" In: Det andra könet / Simone de Beauvoir; översättning: Adam Inczèdy-Gombos & Åsa Moberg i samarbete med Eva Gothlin. Stockholm: Norstedts. 2002 [Ny utg. Stockholm : Norstedts pocket, 2006].
- "Lire Simone de Beauvoir á la Lumierie de Heidegger". Les Tempes Modernes jun-juillet, Nr 619. 2002.
- "Le point de vue du matérialisme historique", In: Simone de Beauvoir: Le Deuxième Sexe, Le Livre Fondateur du féminisme moderne en situation / ouvrage dirigé par Ingrid Galster. Paris: Honoré Champion. 2004.
- "Simone de Beauvoir". In: Dictionnaire Sartre / sous la direction de François Noudelmann et Gilles Philippe. Paris: Honoré Champion. 2004.
