= Nomi Eve =

American fiction writer

- Born: March 13, 1968 (age 58)
- Occupation: Writer
- Writing career
- Genre: Fiction

Nomi Eve (born March 13, 1968) is an American fiction writer. In 2001, her first novel, The Family Orchard was published by Alfred A. Knopf. A year later the paperback was published by Vintage. The first run was 100,000 copies.

In August 2014, her second novel "Henna House" was published by Scribners.

Eve is currently the Director of the Creative Writing MFA program at Drexel University.
