= Evangeline =

Epic poem by Henry Wadsworth Longfellow

Evangeline, A Tale of Acadie
- by Henry Wadsworth Longfellow
- First published in: a book by William D. Ticknor & Co.
- Country: United States
- Language: English
- Genre: Epic poem
- Publication date: 1847

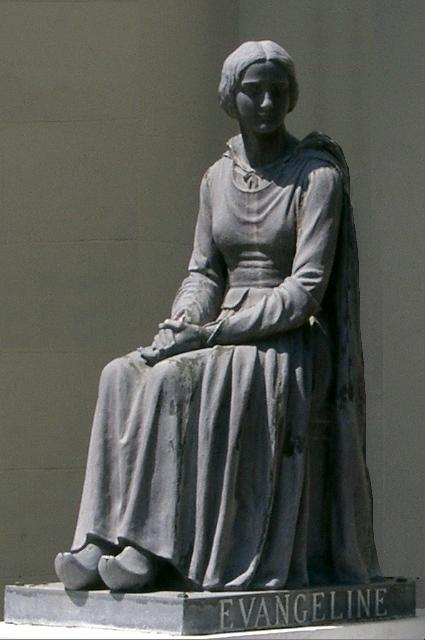
Monument to Acadians, St. Martinville, Louisiana

Evangeline, A Tale of Acadie is an epic poem by the American poet Henry Wadsworth Longfellow, written in English and published in 1847. The poem follows an Acadian girl named Evangeline and her search for her lost love Gabriel during the expulsion of the Acadians (1755–1764).

The idea for the poem came from Longfellow's friend Nathaniel Hawthorne. Longfellow used dactylic hexameter, imitating Greek and Latin classics. Though the choice was criticized, it became Longfellow's most famous work in his lifetime and remains one of his most popular and enduring works.

The poem had a powerful effect in defining both Acadian history and identity in the 19th and 20th centuries. It represents lost loved ones and heartbreak but also keeping hope. While Longfellow was a poet, not a historian, 21st-century scholarship has included those who chose to expound their view that Longfellow's work fails as a scientific historical document.

== Plot ==
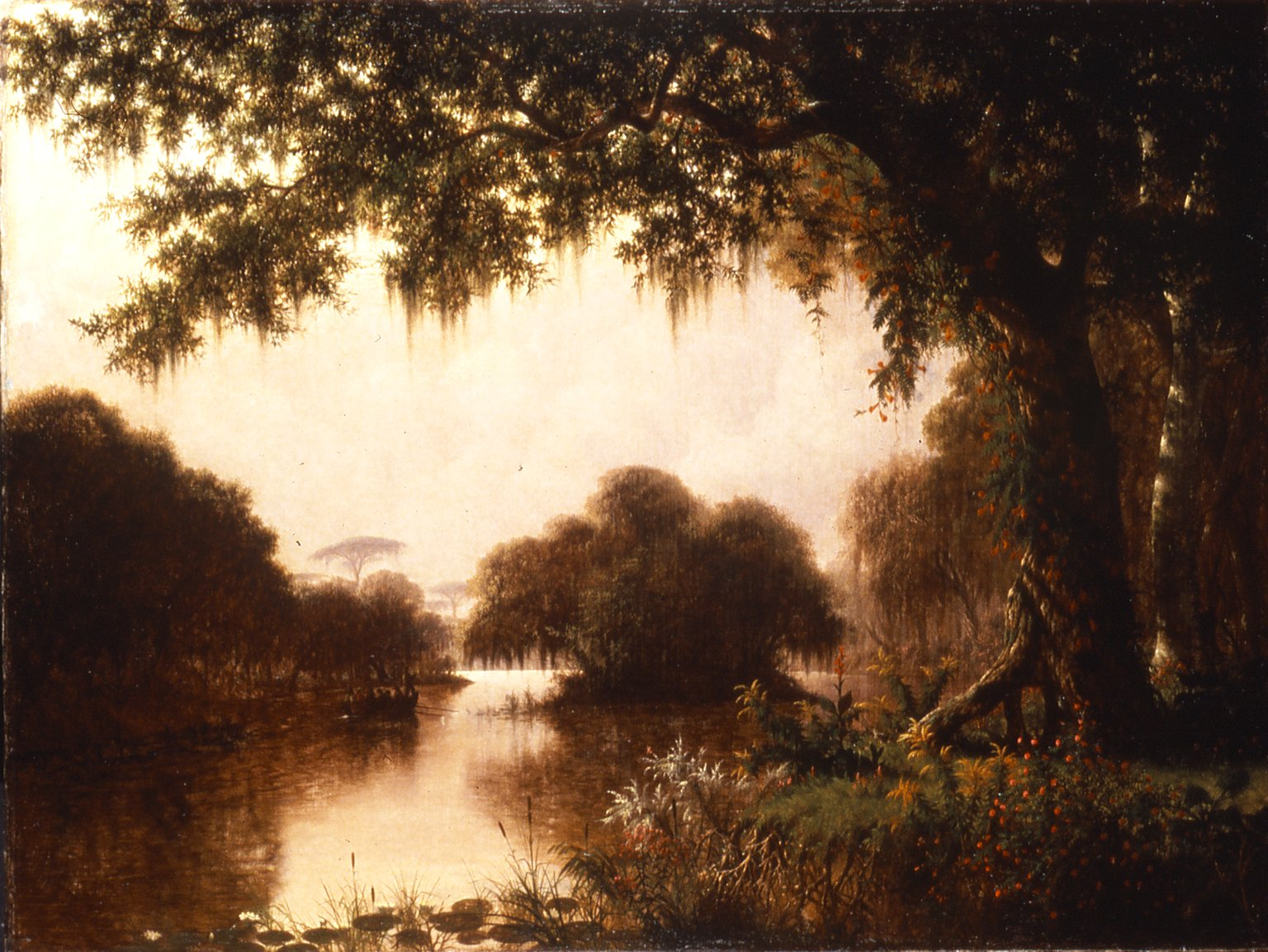
Joseph Rusling Meeker (American, 1827–1889). The Acadians in the Achafalaya, "Evangeline", 1871. Oil on canvas. Brooklyn Museum

Evangeline describes the betrothal of a fictional Acadian girl named Evangeline Bellefontaine to her beloved, Gabriel Lajeunesse, and their separation as the British deport the Acadians from Acadie in the Great Upheaval. The poem then follows Evangeline across the landscapes of America as she spends years in a search for him, at some times being near to Gabriel without realizing he was near. Finally she settles in Philadelphia and, as an old woman, works as a Sister of Mercy among the poor. While tending the dying during an epidemic she finds Gabriel among the sick, and he dies in her arms.

== Composition and publication history ==
Longfellow was introduced to the true story of the Acadians in Nova Scotia by his friend Nathaniel Hawthorne, who was told a story of separated Acadian lovers by Boston minister Rev. Horace Conolly, who heard it from his parishioners. Hawthorne and Longfellow had attended Bowdoin College together, though they were not friends at the time. Years later, in 1837, Hawthorne contacted Longfellow for his opinion on his recently published tales in the North American Review, which Longfellow praised as works of genius; the two became lifelong friends. Hawthorne was not interested in fictionalizing Conolly's idea, because, as he told Conolly, "It is not in my vein: there are no strong lights and heavy shadows." Longfellow took the idea and turned it into a poem after months of studying the histories of Nova Scotian families.

Longfellow, who had never visited the setting of the true story, relied heavily on Thomas Chandler Haliburton's An Historical and Statistical Account of Nova Scotia and other books for further background information. He noted his reliance on other sources in his journal on January 7, 1847: "Went to the library and got Watson's Annals of Philadelphia, and the Historical Collections of Pennsylvania. Also, Darby's Geographical Description of Louisiana. These books must help me through the last part of Evangeline, so far as facts and local coloring go. But for the form and the poetry,—they must come from my own brain."

Evangeline was published in book form on November 1, 1847 by William D. Ticknor & Co., and by 1857 it had sold nearly 36,000 copies. During this time, Longfellow's literary payment was at its peak; for Evangeline, he received "a net of twenty-five and six-tenths per cent" royalties, believed to be an all-time high for a poet. Longfellow said of his poem: "I had the fever a long time burning in my own brain before I let my hero take it. 'Evangeline' is so easy for you to read, because it was so hard for me to write."

== Analysis ==
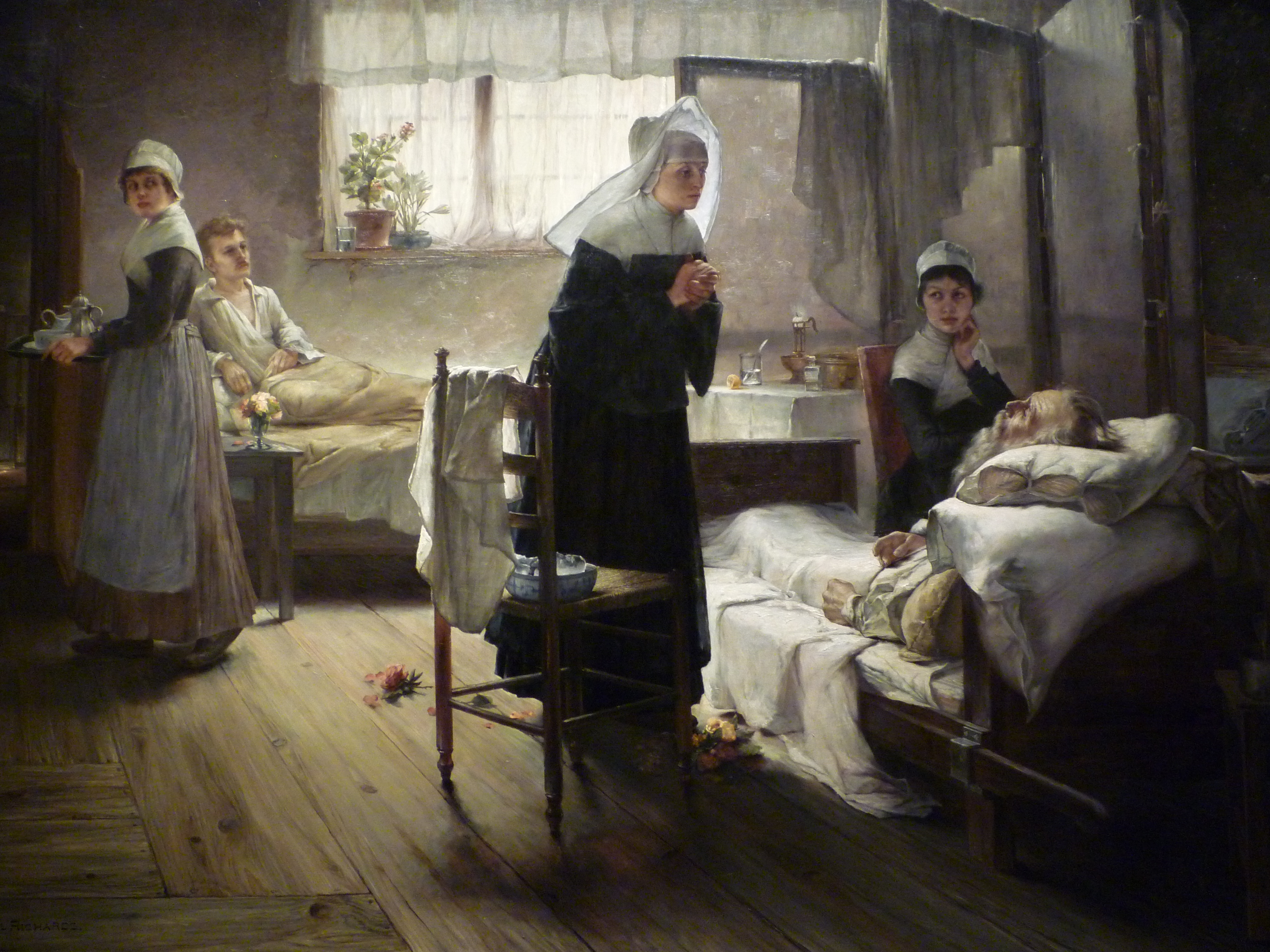
Samuel Richards's painting "Evangeline Discovering Her Affianced in the Hospital"

The poem is written in unrhymed dactylic hexameter, possibly inspired by Greek and Latin classics, including Homer, whose work Longfellow was reading at the time he was writing Evangeline. He also had recently, in 1841, translated "The Children of the Lord's Supper", a poem by Swedish writer Esaias Tegnér, which also used this meter. Evangeline is one of the few nineteenth-century compositions in that meter which is still read today.

Some criticized Longfellow's choice of dactylic hexameter, including poet John Greenleaf Whittier, who said the poem would have been better in a prose style similar to Longfellow's Hyperion. Longfellow was conscious of the potential criticism. When sending a copy of the poem to Bryan Procter, Longfellow wrote: "I hope you will not reject it on account of the meter. In fact, I could not write it as it is in any other; it would have changed its character entirely to have put it into a different measure." Even Longfellow's wife Fanny defended his choice, writing to a friend: "It enables greater richness of expression than any other, and it is sonorous like the sea which is ever sounding in Evangeline's ear." As an experiment, Longfellow reassured himself that he was using the best meter by attempting a passage in blank verse. Even so, while looking over the proofs for a second edition, Longfellow briefly wished he had used a different poetic structure:

It certainly would be a relief to the hexameters to let them stretch their legs a little more at their ease; still for the sake of uniformity I believe they must still sit a while longer with their knees bent under them like travelers in a stage-coach.

— Edward Wagenknecht, Henry Wadsworth Longfellow: Portrait of an American Humanist. (1966) p. 77

The name Evangeline comes from the Latin word "evangelium" meaning "gospel". The Latin word itself is derived from the Greek words "eu"—"good"—and "angela"—"news".

== Prologue ==
Longfellow does not explicitly title the opening three stanzas as the prologue, but publishers generally treat these lines as such. The poem's story begins with the end. The French farmers and fishermen who once inhabited the colony of Acadie in Nova Scotia are gone; the moss-covered trees and the ocean are left to tell the tale.

THIS is the forest primeval. The murmuring pines and the hemlocks,
Bearded with moss, and in garments green, indistinct in the twilight,
Stand like Druids of eld, with voices sad and prophetic,
Stand like harpers hoar, with beards that rest on their bosoms.
Loud from its rocky caverns, the deep-voiced neighboring ocean
Speaks, and in accents disconsolate answers the wail of the forest.

This is the forest primeval; but where are the hearts that beneath it
Leaped like the roe, when he hears in the woodland the voice of the huntsman?
Where is the thatch-roofed village, the home of Acadian farmers,—
Men whose lives glided on like rivers that water the woodlands,
Darkened by shadows of earth, but reflecting an image of heaven?
Waste are those pleasant farms, and the farmers forever departed!
Scattered like dust and leaves, when the mighty blasts of October
Seize them, and whirl them aloft, and sprinkle them far o'er the ocean.
Naught but tradition remains of the beautiful village of Grand-Pré.

Ye who believe in affection that hopes, and endures, and is patient,
Ye who believe in the beauty and strength of woman's devotion,
List to the mournful tradition still sung by the pines of the forest;
List to a Tale of Love in Acadie, home of the happy.

== Critical response ==
Evangeline became Longfellow's most famous work in his lifetime and was widely read. It has been called the first important long poem in American literature. Contemporary reviews were very positive. A reviewer for The Metropolitan Magazine said, "No one with any pretensions to poetic feeling can read its delicious portraiture of rustic scenery and of a mode of life long since defunct, without the most intense delight". Longfellow's friend Charles Sumner said he had met a woman who "has read 'Evangeline' some twenty times and thinks it the most perfect poem in the language". Other admirers of the poem included King Leopold I of Belgium. Speaking privately, all of Longfellow's literary associates but Whittier attacked the piece, including his old friend John Neal, who wrote: "You really ought to be hanged–drawn and quartered" for writing in hexameter.

== Influence ==
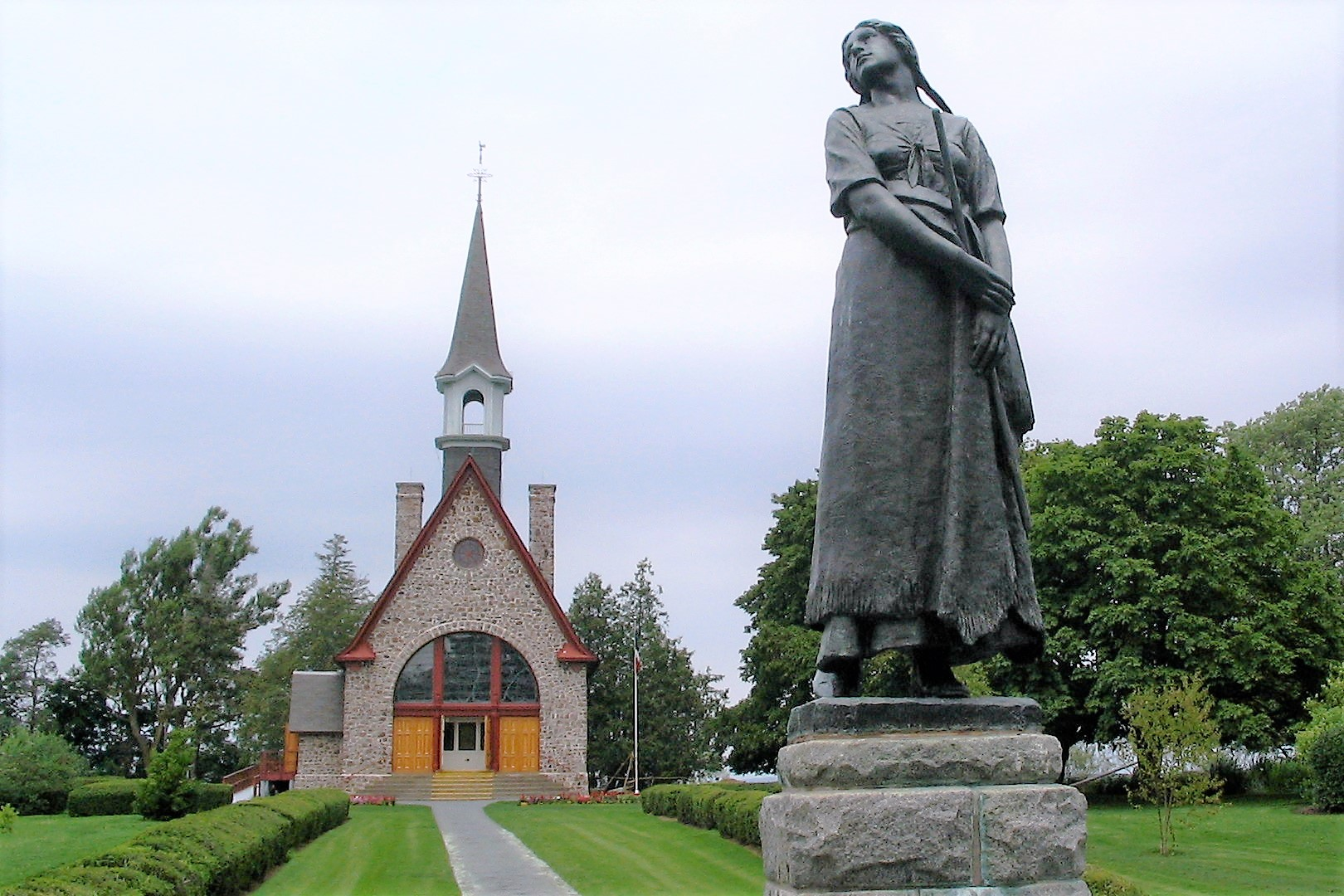
Louis-Philippe Hébert's sculpture of Evangeline, Grand-Pré National Historic Site, Nova Scotia, Canada

Prior to the influence of Longfellow's poem, historians generally focused on the founding of Halifax (1749) as the beginning of Nova Scotian history. Longfellow's poem shed light on the 150 years of Acadian settlement that preceded the establishment of Halifax.

The Expulsion was planned and executed by the British and New England authorities. Longfellow omitted from the poem New England's involvement in the expulsion. Through his poem, Longfellow defines America as a place of refuge for the exiled Acadians. Longfellow's account was later challenged by historian Francis Parkman, in his book Montcalm and Wolfe (1884). Parkman claimed the real reason for the expulsion was the "influence" held by the French over the Acadians, particularly by Abbé Jean-Louis Le Loutre. American historian John Brebner eventually wrote New England's Outpost (1927), which identified how instrumental New Englanders were in the expulsion of the Acadians.

The poem had a powerful impact in defining both Acadian history and identity in the 19th and 20th centuries. More recent scholarship has revealed both the historical misconceptions in the poem and the complexity of the Expulsion and those involved, which the poem obscures. For example, Longfellow's poem depicts Acadia as a utopia and the Acadians as a homogeneous and passive people who are incapable of violence, which ignores the efforts of resistance leader Joseph Broussard and the extensive military history of the Acadians. The poem also allowed for generations of Protestant Anglo-Americans to sympathize with the plight of the Acadians while maintaining anti-Catholic viewpoints. The poem also provided a safe symbolic space for Acadians to develop arguments for more recognition and respect in the United States.

=== Landmarks and statues ===
In 1920, at Grand-Pré, Nova Scotia, Acadians reconstructed the French church with a statue of Evangeline in the courtyard. Almost a decade later, in 1929, a statue of Evangeline, posed for by silent Mexican film star Dolores del Río, who starred in the 1929 film Evangeline, was donated to the town of St. Martinville, Louisiana, by the film's cast and crew. In 1934, the first state park in Louisiana was named the Longfellow-Evangeline State Historic Site.

Felix Voorhies wrote the book Acadian Reminiscences: The True Story of Evangeline and other later works of fiction expanded upon the material of the poem, claiming the "real names" of the characters had been "Emmeline LaBiche" (in Longfellow, her full name is Evangeline Bellefontaine) and "Louis Arceneaux" (in the poem, Gabriel Lajeunesse) Lafayette, Louisiana, which supposedly belonged to Gabriel, and the grave of Emmeline in the Perpetual Adoration Garden & Historic Cemetery in St. Martin de Tours Church Square, on Main Street, St. Martinville (the site having been determined for its convenience by local boosters about the turn of the 20th century). "Evangeline Oak" trees in St. Martinville also lay claim to marking the original meeting place of Emmeline and Louis.

Another site claiming to have relation to the historical figures that Evangeline was based upon is the Arceneaux House in Hamshire, Texas, which is marked by a Texas Historical Marker. The house was given to Mary Gadrac Arceneaux, great-great-granddaughter of Louis Arceneaux by her husband.

=== Place names ===
Evangeline has also been the namesake of many places in Louisiana and the Canadian Maritime Provinces. It is also often used as a street name in Acadian communities.

==== Louisiana ====
In Louisiana, places named Evangeline include:

- Evangeline Parish, Louisiana
- Evangeline, Louisiana, a community in Acadia Parish where the first oil well in Louisiana was drilled
- Evangeline Hall, a residence hall built in 1936 at Louisiana State University

==== Canada ====
Places named Evangeline in Canada include, for example:

- Evangeline, Gloucester County, New Brunswick
- Evangeline-Miscouche, a rural community in Prince Edward Island
- Evangeline, a community within Greater Moncton in Westmorland County, New Brunswick

The Evangeline Trail is a historic route in Nova Scotia that traces the Annapolis Valley, ancestral home of the Acadians. The scenic trail is lined by more than a dozen small Acadian villages, running from Grand-Pré, site of the first expulsions, south to Annapolis Royal near the Habitation at Port-Royal, historic site of the original French settlement in North America. The Evangeline Trail ends in Yarmouth, Nova Scotia on the southwest coast.

=== Film ===
There have also been numerous film adaptations of the poem Evangeline. Evangeline was the first Canadian feature film, produced in 1913 by Canadian Bioscope of Halifax. It was shot in the Annapolis Valley and at Grand-Pré. In 1919, Raoul Walsh made a film based on the poem for 20th Century Fox. It was suggested by and starred his wife Miriam Cooper. The film was one of the duo's biggest hits but is now lost. In 1929, Edwin Carewe made a film version starring Dolores del Río, shot in Louisiana and accompanied by a theme song written by Al Jolson and Billy Rose.

The poem was mentioned in the 1987 film Angel Heart, starring Mickey Rourke and Robert De Niro. Evangeline is also referenced in the 2009 Disney film The Princess and the Frog, wherein a Cajun firefly named Raymond falls in love with Evangeline, who appears as a star. Following his death, they are reunited and appear side by side in the night sky.

=== Music and musical theatre ===
Evangeline has been the subject of numerous songs:

- A popular song in French titled "Evangeline" was written in 1971 by Michel Conte. Originally sung by Isabelle Pierre, a version performed by Annie Blanchard won the ADISQ award for most popular song in 2006.
- Robbie Robertson of The Band wrote the song "Evangeline", performed with Emmylou Harris. In his lyrics, Evangeline is a girl from the Maritimes who awaits her absent lover in Louisiana, but the storyline and time period differ from Longfellow's original. Another Robertson song, "Acadian Driftwood" from 1975, was also influenced by Longfellow's poem.
- A half-hour suite of guitar music by guitarist and composer Loren Mazzacane Connors, based on scenes in the Longfellow story, was released as a compact disc titled Evangeline (RoadCone, 1998), with a title track vocal by Suzanne Langille.
- Indie folk artist Tony Halchak released an EP titled A Tale of Acadie in 2011, based on the poem but told from Gabriel's point of view.

The poem was first adapted into a theatrical musical in 1874, as Evangeline; or, The Belle of Acadia, which was a Broadway success through the late 19th century.

The Canadian folk singer-songwriter Susan Crowe mentions the "statue of Evangeline" in her song "Your One and Only Life", the first track on an album entitled The Door to the River released in 1996.

A 1999 adaptation by Paul Taranto and Jamie Wax, Evangeline: The Musical, resulted in a 1999 cast album, and a Shreveport, Louisiana production of this version was broadcast in 2000 by PBS.

A 2013 musical adaptation, by Canadian Ted Dykstra, premiered in Charlottetown, Prince Edward Island, and was revived in 2015 in Prince Edward Island and in Alberta at Edmonton's Citadel Theatre. The production featured Brent Carver as the father.

Otto Luening's three-act opera Evangeline premiered at Columbia University in New York City in 1948.

An opera based on Evangeline, composed by Colin Doroschuk, debuted in 2012 in reduced concert form, and was first performed in full in 2014 at Opéra-Théâtre de Rimouski. Doroschuk had previously been a member, with his brothers, of the Canadian pop band Men Without Hats.

Edmonton Opera's Brian Deedrick directed an original musical version of Evangeline, written by playwright Winn Bray and composer Tom Doyle, in Calgary, Alberta, Canada, for the Mount Royal College theatre, in 2000.

The poem was mentioned by the band Highly Suspect in the closing song of their 2022 album The Midnight Demon Club. The song is titled "Evangeline" after the poem, and mentions the characters: "Call me Gabriel and you're my Evangeline".

=== Other ===
- The opening phrase of the poem, "This is the forest primeval", has entered the cultural lexicon.
- The Evangeline League operated as a minor-league baseball circuit (primarily in Louisiana) in the 1930s, '40s and '50s.
- A depiction of Evangeline from Longfellow's poem was incorporated into the Dominion Atlantic Railway logo along with the text "Land of Evangeline Route". Additionally, there was once a Via Rail train known as the "Evangeline" that ran from Halifax to Yarmouth, but it ended in 1990.
- VIA Rail's "Evangeline Park" a passenger dome / observation / sleeping car. All but one of these Park Cars can be traced to Canadian National or Provincial parks, except for Evangeline Park. Information from Ian Thom's book "Murals from a Great Canadian Train" suggest that it was named for the Evangeline Memorial Park established by the Dominion Atlantic Railway, which is now the Grand Pré National Historic Site in Nova Scotia.
- L'Évangeline was also an important daily newspaper in New Brunswick, from 1887 to 1982.
- Evangeline Downs is a horse racing track located near Lafayette, Louisiana.
- The 1999 musical version of Evangeline was performed in 2014 at the Conseil Acadien de Par-en-Bas theatre in Tusket, Nova Scotia. An actor travelled from Louisiana to perform the role of Gabriel.
- Historical flaws in the poem (and in the Voorhies work) are revealed, as there is no record of the surnames "LaBiche", "Bellefontaine", nor "Lajeunesse" in any of the censuses taken of the Acadians.
- Carrie Jenkins Harris's final novel A modern Evangeline (1896) is a nod to the poem.
- In the Acadiana region of Louisiana, the local governing council of Scouting America is called the Evangeline Area Council, overseeing Scout troops in eight parishes.
