= Eva Pel =

Dutch visual artist

Eva Pel is a Dutch visual artist living and working in Amsterdam.

Pel's work has dealt with the role of power and control in contemporary society. Her work has taken many different forms, like sculptural interventions, photographic research and publications.

== Education ==
From 1993 to 1997 Pel studied Urban geography at the University of Amsterdam and in 1996 at the School of Urban Planning at University of California, Los Angeles. She finished her degree with the thesis Skateboarders exploring urban public space: Ollies, obstacles and conflicts

She went on to study art in 2001 at the Gerrit Rietveld Academie in Amsterdam, where she graduated with a BA in fine arts in 2005

From 2010 to 2012 Pel studied at the Royal Academy of Art, The Hague for a MA in Artistic Research.

== Residencies, collections and publications ==
- 2012 Salzamt, Linz, Austria

Pel's work is part of several public and private collections including De Nederlandsche Bank, Amsterdam, the Port of Amsterdam and Baker & McKenzie, Amsterdam.

In 2009 she published Observations of a Celebration NL&NY 2009 in collaboration with graphic designer Claudia Doms. The interview newspaper Fame was published in 2005 with graphic design by Natasha Chandani.

== Selected exhibitions ==
- 2014 Janson's and other stories - Lucas Hoeben, 37PK, Haarlem
- 2013 Over het Huis en de Dingen, Frankendael Foundation, Amsterdam
- 2012 Expand, Explore, Expose, Salzamt, Linz, Austria (+ catalogue)
- 2010 Tv Talkshow; the story of the Netherlands, Gallery Witzenhausen, NYC
- 2011 Research and Destroy, Royal Gallery, Royal Art Academy, The Hague
- 2008 LadyFest Amsterdam 2008, Chiellerie, Amsterdam
- 2008 MudPie, Artistic research on art as art and art and life, W139, Amsterdam.
