= James Ransome =

James Ransome may refer to:

- James Ransome (illustrator), American illustrator of children's books
- James Ransome (manufacturer), English manufacturer of agricultural implements and components for railways
- James Allen Ransome, his son, English agricultural-implement maker and agricultural writer

== See also ==
- James Ransone, American actor and musician
