= Railway Express Agency =

American transport network

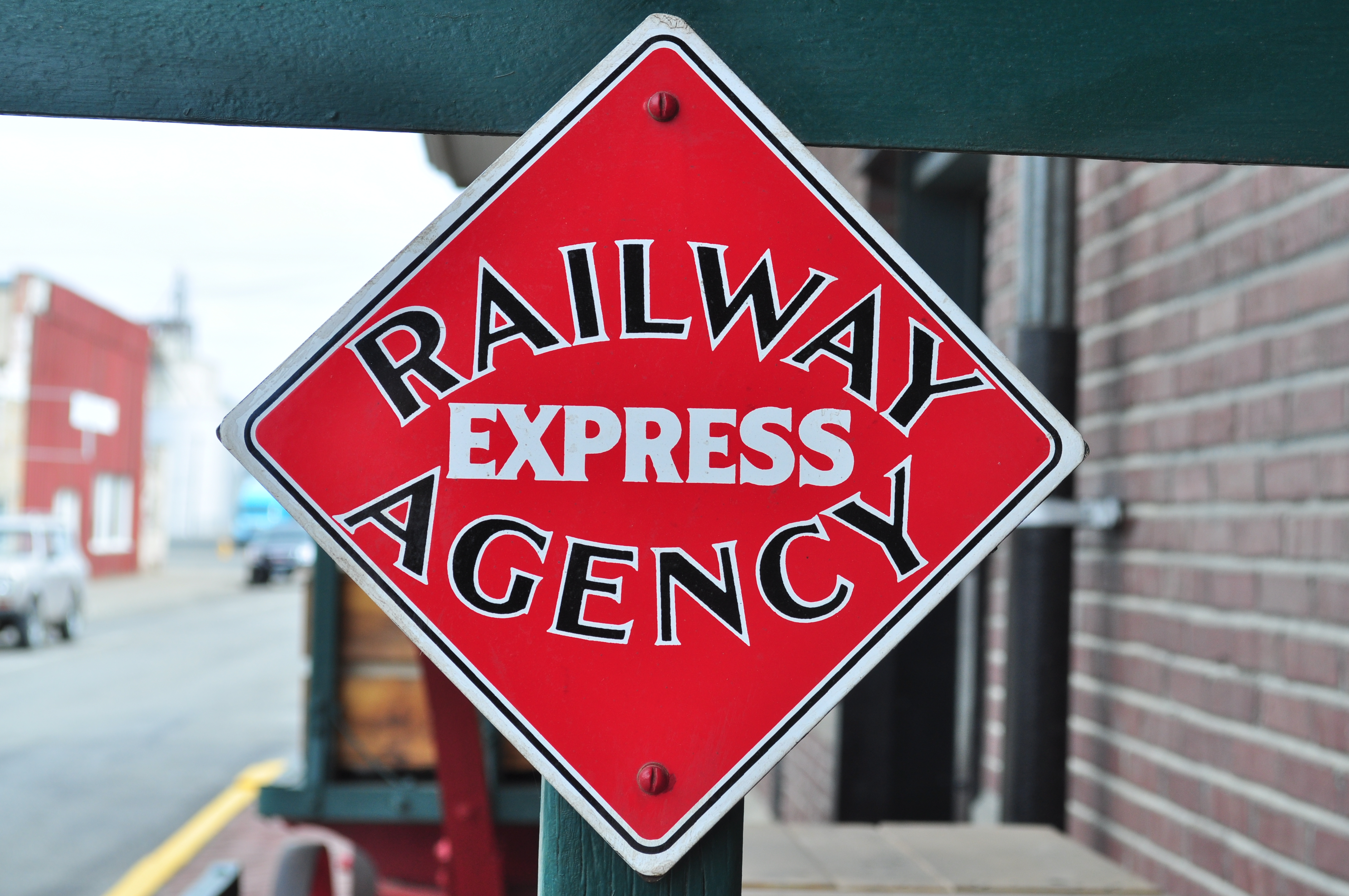
- Formerly: American Railway Express Agency (from 1918); American Railway Express Inc. (until 1929); Railway Express Agency (1929–1960); REA Express, Inc. (1960–1975)
- Predecessors: Railway express operations of: Adams Express Company; American Express Company; Southern Express Company; Wells Fargo & Co; and three others
- Founded: July 1918; 108 years ago
- Defunct: November 1975
- Headquarters: United States

Railway Express Agency (REA Express or REA; founded as the American Railway Express Agency and later renamed American Railway Express Inc.) was a national package delivery service that operated in the United States from 1918 to 1975. REA arranged transport and delivery via existing railroad infrastructure, much as today's UPS or DHL companies use roads and air transport. It was created through the forced consolidation of existing services into a national near-monopoly to ensure the rapid and safe movement of parcels, money, and goods during World War I.

From 1929 to 1973, REA also had monopoly on "air express," with air transportation provided by scheduled air carriers, the ground component provided by REA and revenue split between them. In fact, REA's provision of this service essentially legally defined the term "air express," with a caveat being that there were competing services categorized as "air freight" that surpassed REA's service in both speed and price.

REA ceased operations in 1975, unable to adapt to changes in the rail industry and increased competition from other modes of package delivery.

== History ==
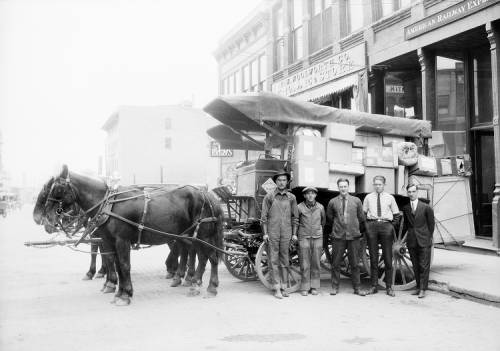
American Railway Express freight wagon, Helena, Montana, 1922

Express delivery in the early 19th century was almost all by horse, whether by stagecoach or riders on horseback. The first parcel express agency in the United States is generally considered to have been started by William F. Harnden (1812–1845), who in 1839 began regular trips between New York City and Boston, Massachusetts, as a courier transporting small parcels, currency and other valuables. Another company, Wells Fargo & Co, was founded in 1853. Other early express companies included Southern Express Company, Adams Express Company; and Butterfield Overland Mail.

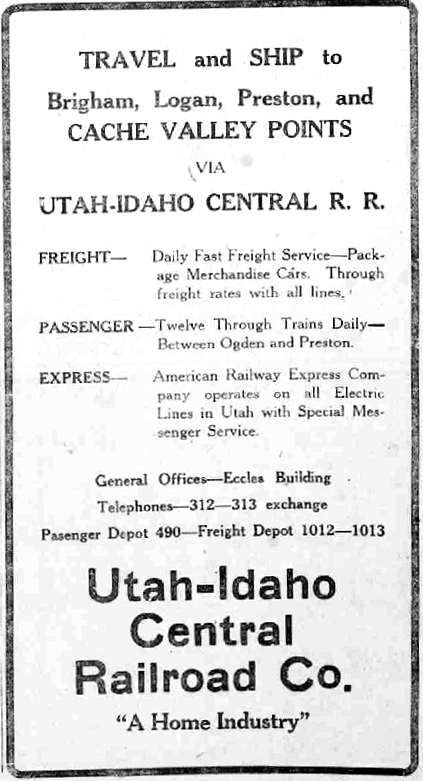
Ad for a railroad, showing American Railway Express service along the Utah Idaho Central Railroad, 1922

As railroads developed and expanded through the United States, linking towns, stagecoach and horseback gave way to rail. The express business flourished in the latter half of the 19th century, and by 1900 there were four principal parcel express companies, all of which included the rapidly advancing railways as one of their means of transport: Adams Express, Southern Express, American Express, and Wells Fargo.

The United States Post Office Department introduced parcel post service in 1913. This enabled an individual to mail an item larger than a letter, up to 11 pounds (5.0 kg) in weight. This was in addition to laws, the Private Express Statutes, that gave Post Office the exclusive right to transport letters. Express companies could not transport letters, unless the letter had the correct United States Postage applied, on top of the rate the express company charged. Private railway express business increased steadily through the end of World War I.

=== World War I ===
During the winter of 1917, the United States suffered a severe coal shortage. On December 26, President Woodrow Wilson nationalized the railroads in order to move federal troops, their supplies, and coal. Treasury Secretary William Gibbs McAdoo was appointed Director General of the newly formed United States Railroad Administration (USRA), which controlled all significant railroads in the country temporarily, starting on 28 December 1917. However, this did not include the various major express companies.

McAdoo did not view the multiple companies as a favorable arrangement, and pushed for their consolidation into a single organization, which was done on 1 July 1918. Railroad-owned Great Northern Express, Northern Express, Western Express, and non-railroad-owned Adams Express, American Express, Wells Fargo, and Southern Express were merged into a single unified entity, American Railway Express Company.

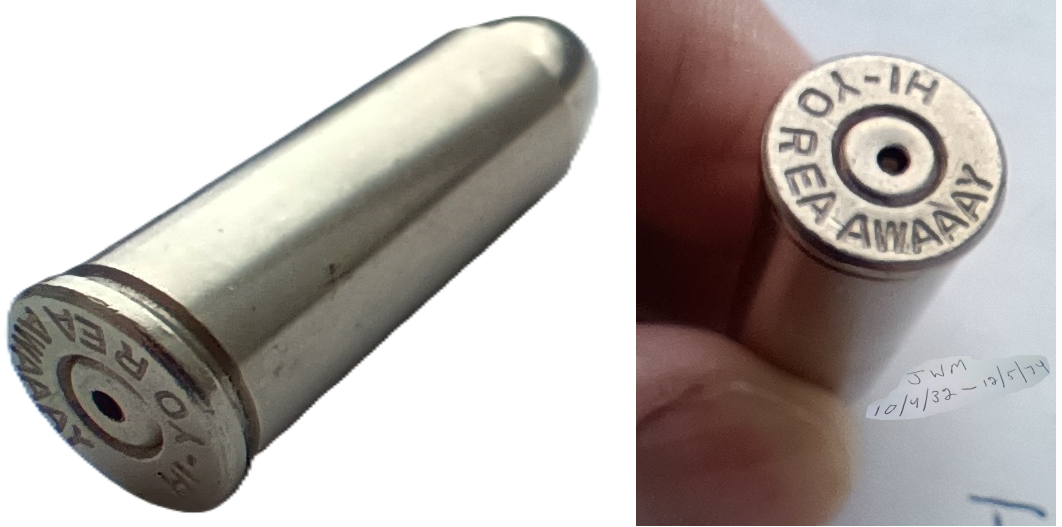
REA Express promotional silver Bullet, circa 1970

The new entity took custody of all the pooled equipment and property of existing express companies (40%, the largest share, came from American Express, who had owned the rights to the express business over 71,280 miles (114,710 km) of railroad lines, and had 10,000 offices, with over 30,000 employees). During the war, redundant facilities were eliminated, staff transferred and procedures refined and improved within the new single company.

Following the return of the railroads to private ownership and operation on 1 March 1920, American Railway Express needed to be unwound. The efforts to improve the organization and eliminate inefficiencies during the war, particularly redundant facilities, now created an issue. These efforts made dismantling the agency and returning it to its pre-war state effectively impossible. With few options, the Interstate Commerce Commission granted approval for a monopoly to exist, but encouraged railroads to start their own independent express services.

=== Railway Express Agency ===
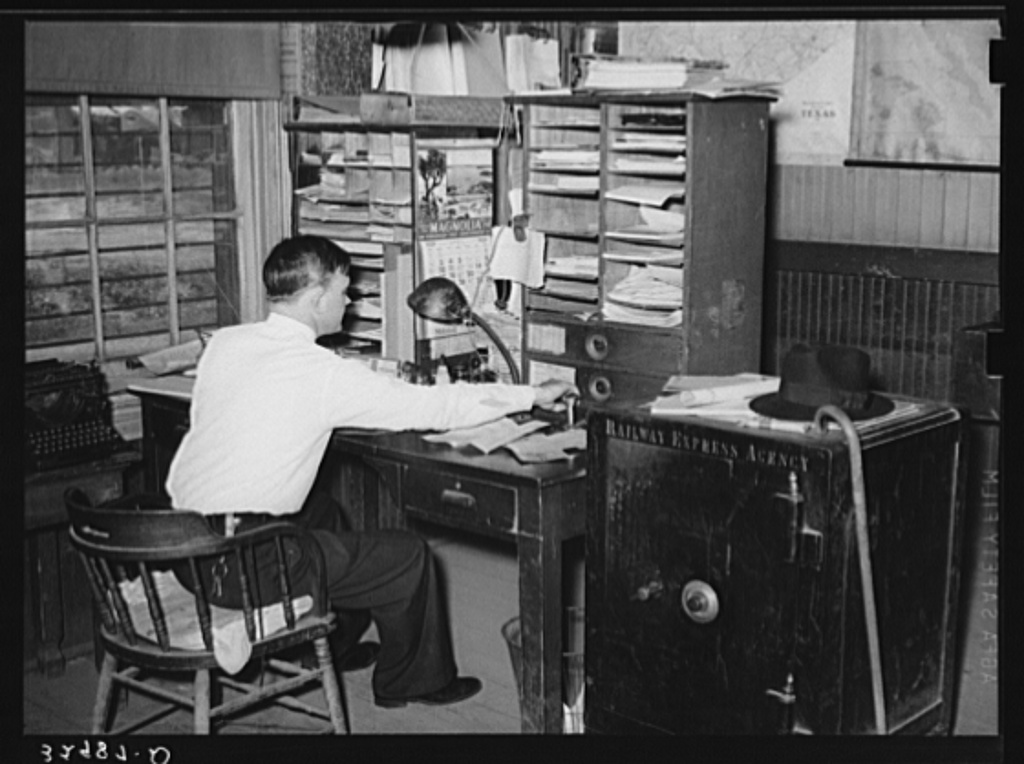
Railway Express Agency office, San Augustine, Texas, 1939

Sixty-nine railroads would take over American Railway Express Inc. on 1 March 1929, under the name Railway Express Agency. This takeover consisted of allocating 1,000 shares of stock, according to the levels of express revenue generated by a railroad. This prevented a single railroad from owning the company, as the Pennsylvania Railroad received only 126 shares, New York Central 98 shares, and third and fourth highest stakes were Southern Pacific and Santa Fe with 46 shares each. Some of the smallest railroads to receive any shares, such as the Bangor & Aroostook, received only a single share. Share ownership was not required to participate in the Railway Express Agency, with share-less railroads still moving REA traffic. However they wouldn't receive profits from REA, which were paid out according to share ownership. A notable standout from the takeover was Southern Railway, which had its own railway express service, Southeastern Express, that remained independent until being taken over in 1938.

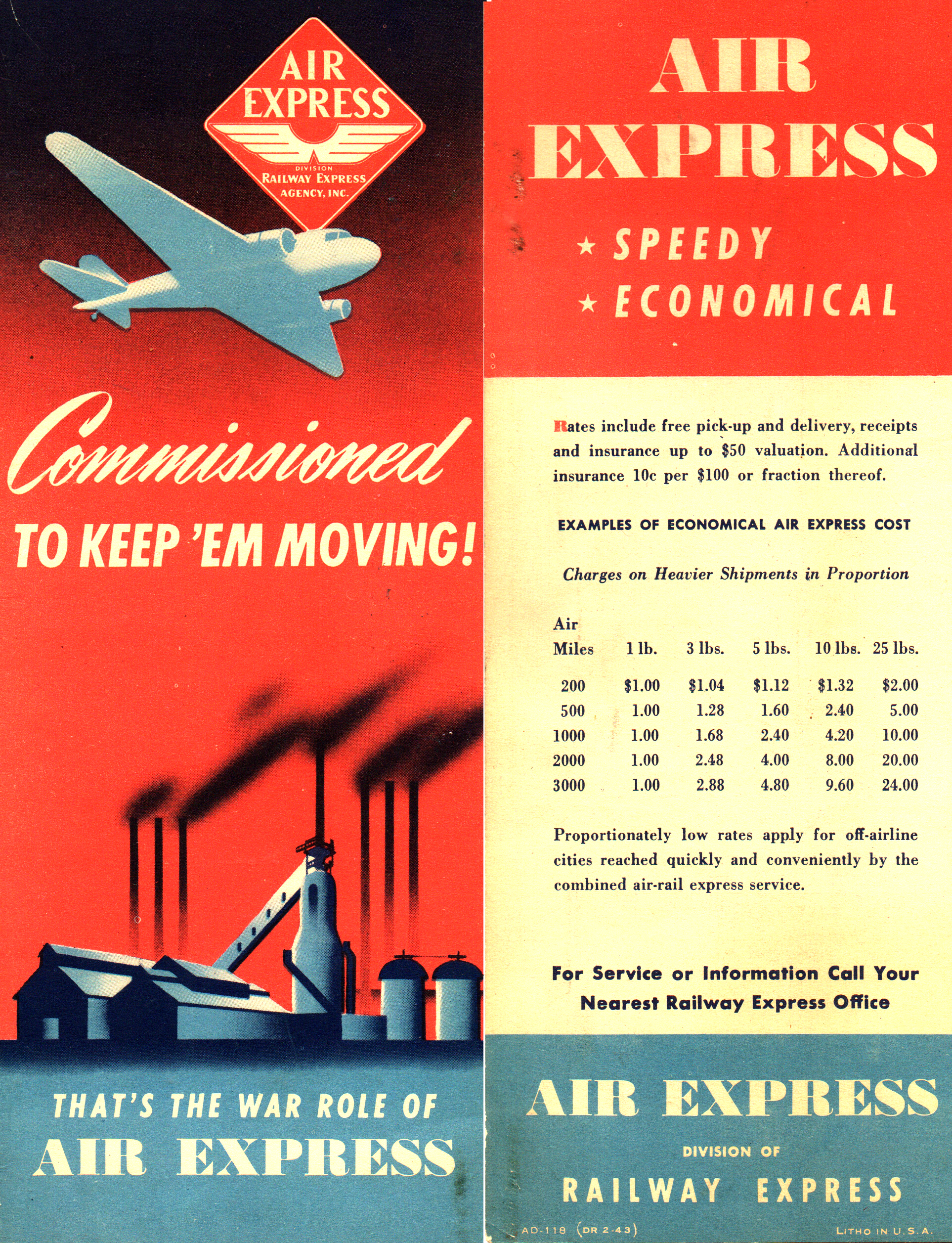
REA Air Express Brochure 1943

In response to customer demand, REA added a Chicago-based refrigerator car line. In 1927, REA began an Air Express Division.

=== Air express ===
From the late 1920s onward, REA contracted with the airlines of the time to offer air express service, giving it, by 1937, a monopoly on all air freight. REA provided the ground component, the airlines the air component, revenues were split between them. In 1938, the Civil Aeronautics Act passed, tightly regulating air transport, with the economic regulator being the brief-lived Civil Aeronautics Authority, superseded in 1940 by the Civil Aeronautics Board (CAB). Under the 1938 Act, airlines could transport mail, passengers or "property", this being the term for cargo. The CAB allowed the arrangement between REA and the now regulated passenger airlines largely in place, but drew a distinction between air freight and air express. In the absence of any distinction in the 1938 Act, "air express" became, by definition, what REA provided. In practice it was a small-package service, but in theory, a delivery of any size could go through REA. Air freight was everything else, typically larger consignments, but also included air freight forwarder Emery Air Freight's "Blue Ribbon" service, a premium door-to-door fastest-possible delivery service actively tracked (and re-routed as necessary) that was priced higher than REA.

The arrangements between REA and the airlines persisted, with periodic re-negotiations, until 1969, when they were unable to come to an agreement. This ultimately resulted in the CAB launching an investigation in 1970, with a final decision at the end of 1973 ending REA's privileged position, turning it into a freight forwarder. While the airlines and REA agreed they wanted express to continue, they could not agree how. A deteriorating surface business meant REA needed better terms for air express, but the CAB's view was that REA's effective monopoly was already anomalous, which the CAB had always seen as temporary. Meanwhile, the breadth of some forwarder business, like Emery, was beginning to rival that of REA, so the CAB did not think there was much to be lost.

=== Post-World War II ===
Following the end of the war, express operations remained profitable into the 1950s. As passenger operations struggled from competition with the growing airline industry and automobile ownership, express revenues did better than passenger revenues in some situations. The reality was less ideal, as increased profitability observed in the early 1950s was the result of shipping rate increases. Traffic declined compared to the 1940s, with shipments falling by 62 percent between 1946 and 1950.

Individual shipments by year
Year	Shipments (in millions)	Percent decrease compared to 1946
1946	231	—N/a
1950	87	62%
1954	77	66%
1958	73	68%
1964	68	70%

REA concentrated on express refrigerator service after 1940, and continued to expand its fleet of express reefers until the mid- to late-1950s. At that time, business declined dramatically, owing to competition from refrigerated motor trucks. By this time, overall rail express volume had also decreased substantially. Federal investment in the interstate highway system after WWII meant that trucks and other vehicles had more flexibility in transporting goods. The increase in private ownership of automobiles doomed many passenger lines, and industrywide restructuring took place.

In 1959, REA negotiated a new contract, allowing it to use any mode of transportation. It also acquired rights to allow continued service by truck after passenger trains were discontinued. REA unsuccessfully attempted entering the piggyback and container business. Another blow came when the Civil Aeronautics Board terminated REA's exclusive agreement with the airlines for air express shipping.

By 1965 many of REA's refrigerator cars, stripped of their refrigeration equipment, were in lease service as bulk mail carriers. Many were relegated to work train service.

=== REA Express and decline ===
In February 1964, Greyhound Lines attempted to buy a majority ownership stake in Railway Express Agency, for $20 ($207.60 in 2025) per share, for at least 50% of all shares, and to demonstrate their commitment to the offer, bought 500,000 unissued shares from a 1963 stock split. Some railroads objected to this effort, and initiated legal action, and eventually Greyhound withdrew their offer. Attempts to buy REA would continue through the rest of the 1960s. By 1969, arrangements were made to sell REA. Five existing REA corporate officers would buy out the shares at $1 ($8.78 in 2025) per share, or around $2.5 million ($21.9 million in 2025) in total. In November, Tom Kole, formerly of Ryder Truck Lines, was brought in to lead marketing for the company. By then Railway Express Agency only received 10% of revenue from its rail operations, the remaining amounts came from trucking (60%) and air express (40%).

On 1 June 1970, the company adopted the new name REA Express, Inc., revealing a new image to distance itself from its railroad past. Newly delivered trucks were now a light gray with a blue arrow pointing diagonally upward. The iconic red diamond was revised to show the abbreviation "REX". Tom Kole, having only joined REA Express the previous year, had taken over as president and CEO of REA Express, Inc from Spenser D. Mosely, who had led the buyout in 1969.

In 1971, REA Express initiated a lawsuit against 160 railroads for $145 million ($1.15 billion in 2025) over a number of issues. They also initiated a lawsuit against United Parcel Service, alleging that UPS had conspired for 60 years to monopolize the small parcels' market. The company also became involved with lawsuits with unions over efforts to layoff large numbers of employees at once. ICC data revealed that REA Express now only handled 1% of intercity small parcels traffic. During the railroad strike of October 1974, the first Altair 8800 microcomputer was lost. It had been shipped from Albuquerque to Popular Electronics magazine in New York via REA and never arrived.

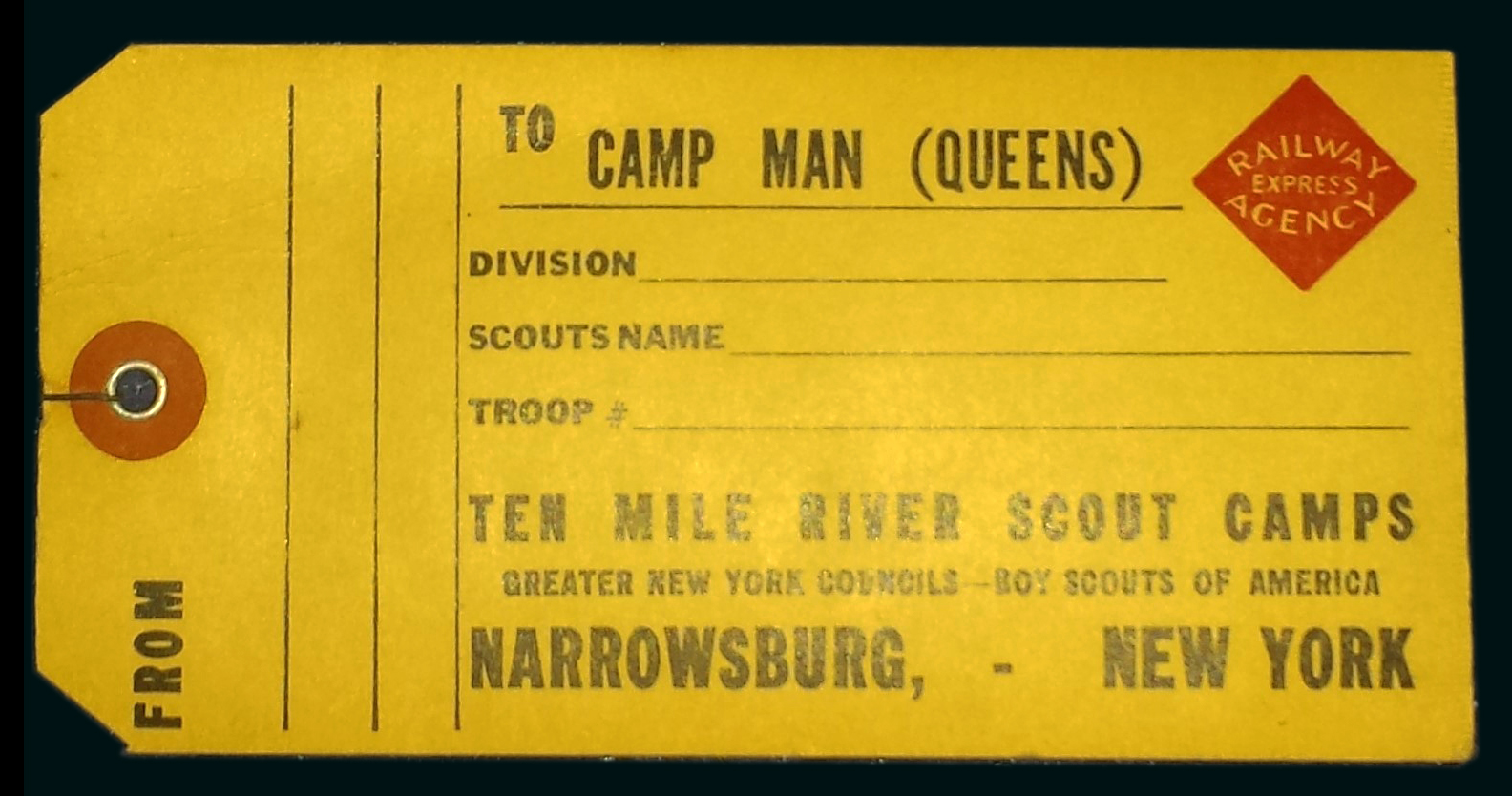
Railway Express Agency luggage tag from New York City to Narrowsburg, for the Queens Boy Scout camp, Camp Man

The effects of the recession literally pulled the rug out from under our carefully planned recovery program and our cash position during the past two months has become critical. Our attempts to obtain Government‐backed loans and relief legislation have not been successful.

— Tom Kole, REA Express, Inc. President, New York Times (February 1975)

From 1969 to the end in 1975, REA Express, Inc. lost an average of $50,000,000 ($415,426,497 in 2023) every year. On February 18, 1975, REA Express, Inc. filed for Chapter 11 bankruptcy, blaming high inflation, lack of available credit, a downturn in express shipments and losses due to continued issues with railroads. In June 1975, wildcat strikes occurred at facilities in New York City, Chicago, St Louis, Kansas City, Philadelphia and Oklahoma in reaction to bankruptcy reorganization efforts during the preceding months, including a 10 percent pay cut, the dismissal of 3,200 employees, and closure of 114 terminals. Despite reorganization efforts, the company wouldn't last long, collapsing eight months later on 6 November 1975.

In 1978, former REA Express president and CEO Tom Kole would be indicted on six counts in federal court: Three counts of embezzlement, two counts of making false statements to the Interstate Commerce Commission, and one count of conspiracy. Kole, along with others, was accused of embezzling over $100,000 ($598,330 in 2025) from REA Express during its final years. Kole was sentenced to two years in prison in early 1978 after pleading guilty to the conspiracy charge on 16 January 1977.

== Operations ==
=== Arrangement with railroads ===
The original 1929 contract with railroads lasted 25 years, ending in 1954. The arrangement granted REA the exclusive right to express services on railroads. The railroads would provide rolling stock, space at stations, access to railroad platforms, as well as any space in any baggage car that was not being used. In turn, REA would provide 85% of gross revenue from its rail car shipments to the railroads. After operating expenses were calculated, any profits would be disbursed monthly to the shareholder railroads, according to REA traffic on the railroads.

In 1954, this arrangement remained largely the same, however changes in railroad operations, as passenger rail was gradually vanishing, combined with increased competition from a growing less-than-truckload trucking industry forced a revaluation of the agreement in October 1959. The structure of the agreement was completely overhauled, with REA now required to buy space on trains as required for their shipments. However, REA was no longer required to get permission from a railroad to use a mode of transport other than rail. The payment structure was also revised, now a simple 50–50 split with the carrier being used for that journey. This would be momentarily successful, but ultimately not enough for REA to make a meaningful turnaround.

=== Vehicles ===
==== Rail ====
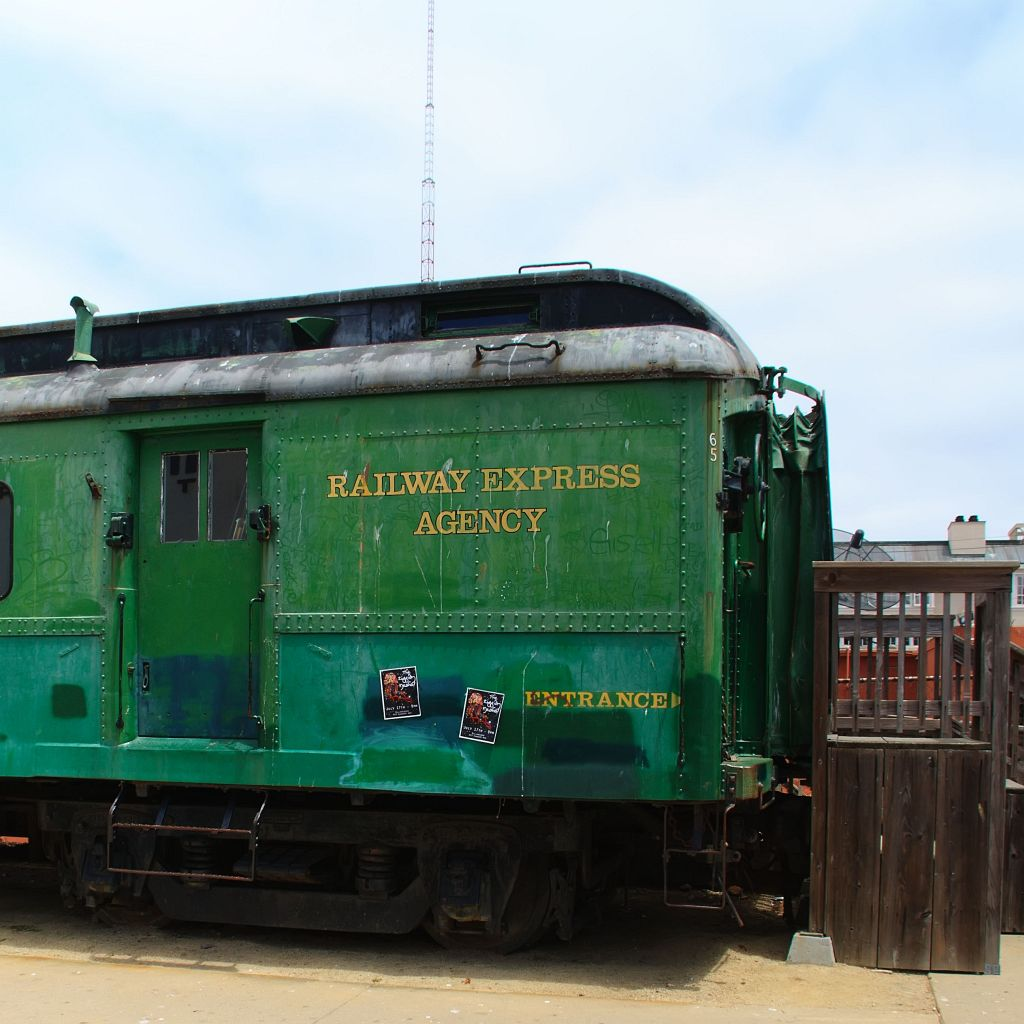
REA baggage car detail

Railroad rolling stock as the backbone of REA's fleet, particularly prior to the 1950s. The cars stood out with a simple dark green paint scheme and Railway Express Agency on the side. From the 1950s onward, the iconic red diamond logo was also painted on the side.

The fleet consisted of baggage cars, refrigerator cars and box cars, all capable of high speed operation and equipped to be added to passenger train consists.

==== Road ====
Despite being known for their railroad connection, Railway Express Agency maintained an extensive fleet of motor vehicles. In 1925, the English electrical engineer, Frank Ayton reckoned that with 1,800 electrical vehicles in operation, they were the biggest user of electric vehicles in the world. They also used 4,700 gasoline-powered vehicles for long-distance work and 17,500 horses.

By December 1941, REA had acquired 12,000 trucks. Most of these were delivery style trucks for local deliveries between terminals and customers, with a smaller amount of semi-trailers. Due to REA's connections to the railroads and ICC regulations for most of its existence, packages were required to be transported by rail. Transport by truck or other mode required explicit permission from the railroad impacted by the change of transport mode. Even following loosening of these regulations still had notable limitations, such as a package being allowed to be transported by truck only if the package had either traveled by rail earlier in its journey, or would do so later.

==== Air ====
American Railway Express would be one of the first air freight companies in the United States, making a test flight on 14 November 1919. This early success would persist, for decades, with REA dominating the field through 1950s. REA didn't operate its own aircraft, similar to its arrangement with railroads to use space in baggage cars, the company had agreements with dozens of airlines to transport express freight on their aircraft.

REA's domination of air express freight would come to an end shortly before its demise, when the Civil Aeronautics Board, responsible for regulation of aviation operations, required airlines that REA was using to ship its express cargo, to discontinue the practice by 5 June 1974.

=== REALCO ===
REALCO, REA Leasing, Co., was a subsidiary of Railway Express Agency, intended to be a fleet of semi-trailers that were owned and serviced by REA and leased to railroads, often decorated with the leasing railroads logo and colors, under either the general reporting mark 'REAZ' or a company specific reporting mark starting with an "R". In 1969, REA sold off REALCO to Integrated Container Services.

== Notable people ==
- Arthur Perdue worked as a Railway Express agent in Salisbury, Maryland.
- Robert E. M. Cowie was president of the company, 1928–1932

== Bibliography ==
- Roseman, V.S. (1993). Railway Express - An Overview (2nd ed.). Rocky Mountain Pub. ISBN 0961269251.
- Roseman, V.S. (2025). Railway Express Agency and Its Place in the Express Industry. Bucklin, MO: White River Productions. ISBN 9781958639191.
- Hayden, Bob (1985). Drury, George H. (ed.). The historical guide to North American railroads. Milwaukee, WI: Kalmbach Books. ISBN 0-89024-072-8. OCLC 13388959.
- Drury, George H. (June 5, 2006). "Railway Express Agency: Yesterday's Federal Express". Trains. Kalmbach Publishing. Archived from the original on August 6, 2020.
- Shaw, Robbert B. (July 1979). "Decline and Decay of REA". Trains. Vol. 39, no. 9. A.C. Kalmbach.
- Wilson, Jeff (2016). Express, Mail & Merchandise Service. Waukesha, WI: Kalmbach Books. ISBN 9781627003780.
- Garrett, Klink; Smith, Toby (2003). Ten Turtles to Tucumcari - A Personal History of the Railway Express Agency (1st ed.). University of New Mexico Press. ISBN 0826330495.
- Wells, Fargo & Company Wells Fargo Messenger. 1912–1918.
- American Railway Express Company., Railway Express Agency. The Express messenger. 1918–1941.
- Civil Aeronautics Board; Federal Maritime Commission; Interstate Commerce Commission (August 1965). Study of REA Express (Staff Study) (Report). hdl:2027/mdp.39015020933712.
