= Arthur Kett Barclay =

English astronomer

- Born: 1806; Bury Hill, Derbyshire
- Died: 1869 (aged 62–63); Bury Hill, Dorking, Surrey
- Occupations: Brewer astronomer
- Spouse: Maria Octavia Wright
- Children: 2

Arthur Kett Barclay (20 June 1806 – 20 November 1869) was a member of the Meteorological Society.

== Biography ==
=== Early life ===
Barclay attended Harrow School after a period of private tutoring. At the age of twenty (in 1826) he joined Barclay, Perkins & Co. brewers of Southwark, London. He travelled through Europe between 1829 and 1833.

=== Marriage and children ===
Arthur married Maria Octavia Wright (ca. 1806–??) on an unknown date and had the following children.

- Robert Barclay (1837–1913)
- Reverend Charles Wright Barclay (1853–1926)

=== Astronomy ===
In 1848 Arthur Kett Barclay built his own astronomical observatory at Bury Hill, Dorking, Surrey. The revolving dome was made by Ransomes & May of Ipswich and the eight-inch (203mm) aperture refracting telescope was by Troughton & Simms of London

== Philosophical and/or political views ==
Barclay supported the Conservative Party, but "would never consent to be brought forward as a candidate". He was also a magistrate and deputy lieutenant for the county of Surrey.

== Honours, decorations, awards and distinctions ==
- Fellow of the Geological Society from 1827
- Master of the Worshipful Company of Brewers in 1840
- Fellow of the Royal Geographical Society from 1840
- Fellow of the Royal Astronomical Society from 1845
- Member of the Meteorological Society from 1850
- Fellow of the Royal Society from 1852
