= Stafford Allen =

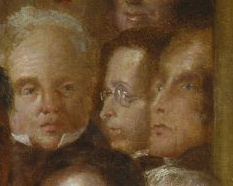
- Abraham Beaumont, Stafford Allen and William Beaumont at the World Anti-Slavery Convention
- Born: 1806; Witham, Essex, England
- Died: 14 October 1889 (aged 82–83); Upper Clapton, England
- Occupation: industrialist
- Known for: Abolitionist and philanthropist
- Spouse: Hannah Hunton (born Ransome)

Stafford Allen (1806 – 14 October 1889) was an English industrialist, abolitionist and philanthropist. He founded the company Stafford Allen and Sons. He supported a number of causes and after fifty years of support he was made a Vice-President of the British and Foreign Anti-Slavery Society.

== Life ==
Allen was born in Witham, Essex in 1806. He was the son of two Quakers, Phebe (born Lucas) and Samuel Allen. He married Hannah Hunton Ransome daughter of James Ransome of Ipswich in 1839 and they had a large family. Including Francis Allen of Cockley Cley Hall (1852-1926) who had business interests in Egypt (including in the Khedivial Mail Steamship Company).

1840 World Anti-Slavery Convention. Move your cursor to identify delegates or click the icon to enlarge. Allen is in the top left quarter.

He started a pharmacy company named Stafford Allen and sons in 1833 which created large profits. The company created a wide range of products but specialised in derivatives from Cedar wood and cloves. Allen also possessed an iron foundry but this was of secondary interest. His business interests initially involved his brother George and another partner called George May.

In 1840 he attended the World Anti-Slavery Convention at Exeter Hall in London. This convention was organised by Joseph Sturge and the British and Foreign Anti-Slavery Society. Allen was one of the patrons of this organisation. When the commemorative picture was painted the major delegates were included in the painting including several bankers, Richard Tapper Cadbury and Stafford Allen.

Allen continued to get involved with the condition of the slaves after they were freed. After many years of remote support he visited the United States to see the conditions that the freed people of the United States faced following the end of their civil war. In the same year Harriet Jacobs who was a former slave and activist visited Britain to raise funds for orphans and freed, but poverty stricken, people in Savannah, Georgia. Jacobs published her appeal for funds in the Anti-Slavery Reporter and asked for them to be sent to Clementia Taylor, Robert Alsop or Stafford Allen.

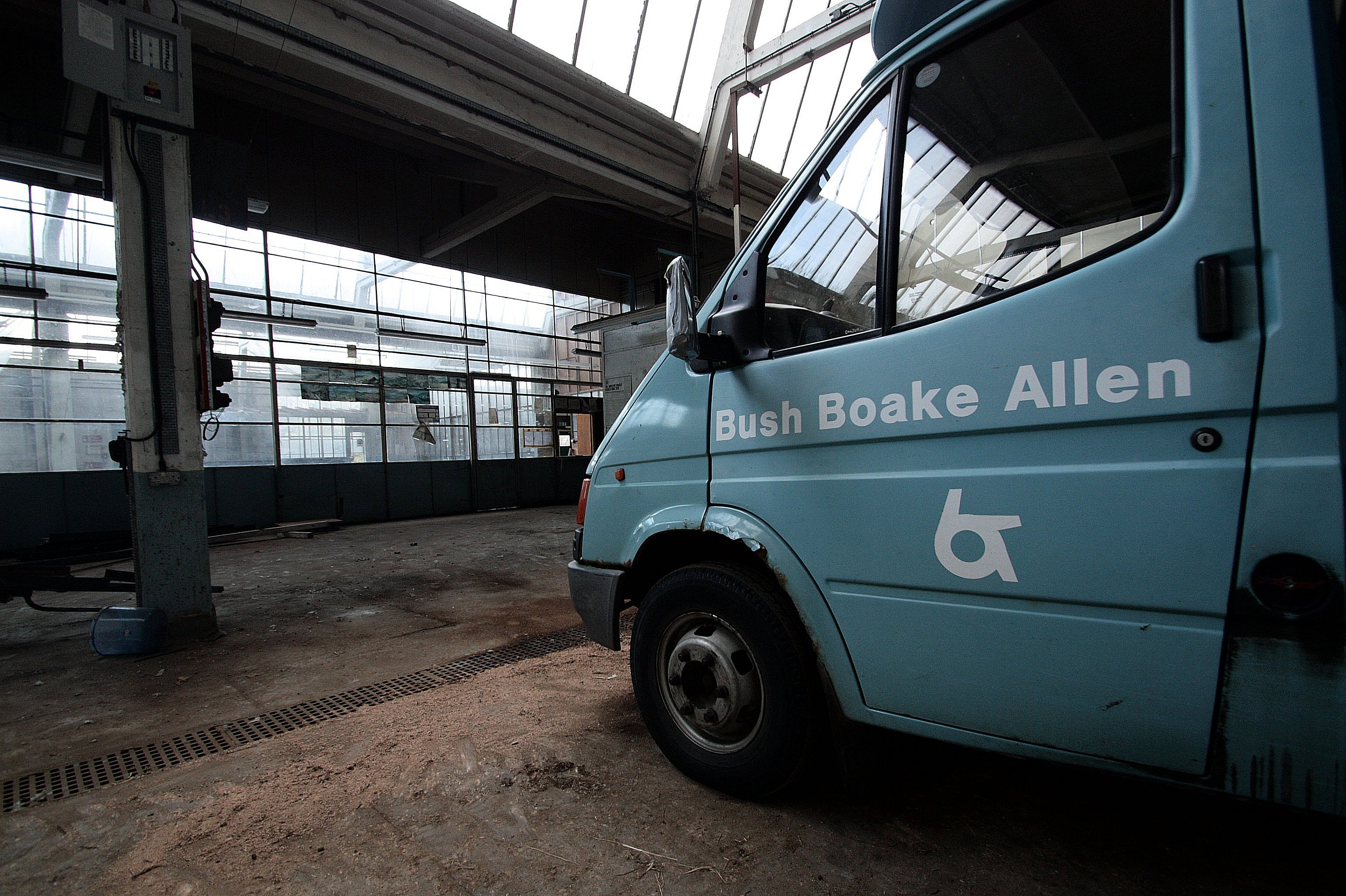
Bush Boakes Allen was a company formed from Stafford Allen and Sons

Allen was involved in more philanthropy during the Franco-Prussian War of 1870. Allen sat on a committee of the Society of Friends (Quakers) who tried to mitigate the suffering. The committee sent assistance including medicines donates by Allen's company. In the same year he visited Egypt and Palestine.

Allen's wife, Hannah, died in 1880. After fifty years of support he was made a Vice-President of the British and Foreign Anti-Slavery Society.

He died in Parkfield, Upper Clapton in October 1889.

== Legacy ==
Stafford Allen and Sons became part of the company Bush, Boake Allen which was acquired by International Flavors and Fragrances in 2000.
