= Robert E. M. Cowie =

Robert E. M. Cowie (died 1934) was a Scottish-born American businessman, best known as president of the Railway Express Agency.

== Life and career ==
Cowie was born in Aberdeen, and as a teenager traveled to the United States in steerage, after plans to emigrate to South Africa fell through. Employed as an office boy in the Cleveland offices of the American Express Company, at the age of 19 he became a clerk, on 60 dollars per month, and married Effie Warner, who outlived him. Together they adopted two children, his nephew and niece.

In 1890, Cowie moved to Chicago as secretary to the general manager, and in 1906 became assistant general manager. In 1915 he became general manager in New York. In 1918 the American Express Company was incorporated into the new American Railway Express, Inc., of which he became president and general manager in 1923. In 1928 American Railway Express was merged into the Railway Express Agency, of which he became president in 1928. He also held chairmanships and directorships of the Golconda Petroleum Corporation, Chase National Bank, the Cuba-Mexican Syndicate, and the Citizens National Bank of Los Angeles.

He was an organizer of the Air Mail Extension Committee of the Aeronautical Chamber of Commerce, formed in 1923, and in January 1925 gave written testimony to the Congressional Committee on Aviation in favour of government assistance for the development of commercial air traffic:

In my opinion the establishment of commercial aviation is of the utmost importance in the development of air power as national defense, and the Government should encourage commercial aviation by furnishing without cost the use of landing and starting fields, beacon lights and other paraphernalia essential for successful flying, in the same manner as they do navigation, by lighthouses, life saving stations, ocean charts, etc. Commercial aviation should be rated in importance, first for handling emergency express shipments, second for handling mail, third for handling passengers. Commercial aviation is purely a business proposition. Flying has been accomplished and the thing remaining to be done is to adapt this facility to commercial purposes. We are ready to consider contractual arrangements for air service as soon as any dependable, well set up and strongly financed organization can furnish us the service, preferably beginning with a route between New York and Chicago with night flying.

He retired to California in 1932, and died there on June 22, 1934, at the age of 71.

== Publications ==
- "Flying Freight", Magazine of Business, September 1928, pp. 241-244, 276-278.
- "American Railway Express". Encyclopaedia Britannica. Vol. 1 (14 ed.). 1930. p. 797.
