= Imperial Service College =

English independent school

Information
- Former name: St. Mark's School
- Established: 1845
- Closed: 1942 (merged with Haileybury to become Haileybury and Imperial Service College)

The Imperial Service College (ISC) was an English independent school based in Windsor, originally known as St. Mark's School when it was founded in 1845.

In 1906, St Mark’s School absorbed boys from the former United Services College, which had failed. In 1911, St Mark’s was also in difficulties, and after securing support from the Imperial Service College Trust it was renamed as Imperial Service College, St Mark’s. On the death of Lord Kitchener in 1916, Prince Alexander of Teck, soon to become Alexander Cambridge, 1st Earl of Athlone, launched a public appeal for a permanent endowment of the school in Kitchener’s memory. He noted that the Imperial Service College had been founded “for the purpose of providing a public school education for the Sons of Officers of limited means belonging to the Navy, Army, and Higher Civil Services.”

In 1942, the school merged with Haileybury to form Haileybury and Imperial Service College.

During the 1950s, part of the site was the home of the Royal Horse Guards Light Aid Detachment Royal Electrical and Mechanical Engineers (LAD REME RHG), while the school’s Kipling Memorial Building (1939) was occupied by the Royal Borough of New Windsor Council.

The area is now being redeveloped as offices.

== Notable alumni ==
- Military
  - Colonel John L. Collard, MC, Order of the Star of Nepal, Nepalese Burma Medal
  - Lt. Colonel Charles J. Boulter, MC, O.B.E.
  - Air Vice-Marshal Sir Laurence Sinclair, GC
  - Group Captain Randolph Stuart Mills DFC
  - Squadron Leader Peter Gardner, DFC
  - Sir John Gorman, MC
  - Wing Commander Clive Beadon, DFC, Burma Star
  - Sir Richard Williams, KBE, CB, DSO: the only Australian to command the RAAF Wing in the field in World War I and the first Australian to become an Air Marshal
  - Group Captain Peter Erskine Vaughan-Fowler, CVO, DSO, DFC and bar, AFC, Croix de Guere, Legion d' Honneur
- Others
  - Frank Ayton: electrical engineer and pioneer of electric vehicles
  - Charles Ede: founder of the Folio Society
  - William Hartnell: actor who played the first Doctor Who
  - Krishen Khanna: Indian artist
  - Hubert Stanley Middleton, organist and Cambridge academic.
  - Prince Andrew Romanov, Russian royal and artist
  - Peter Woods, journalist, newsreader

== Benefactors ==
- Patrick Young Alexander
