= Ransome Victory Plough =

Mouldboard plough of southern Africa

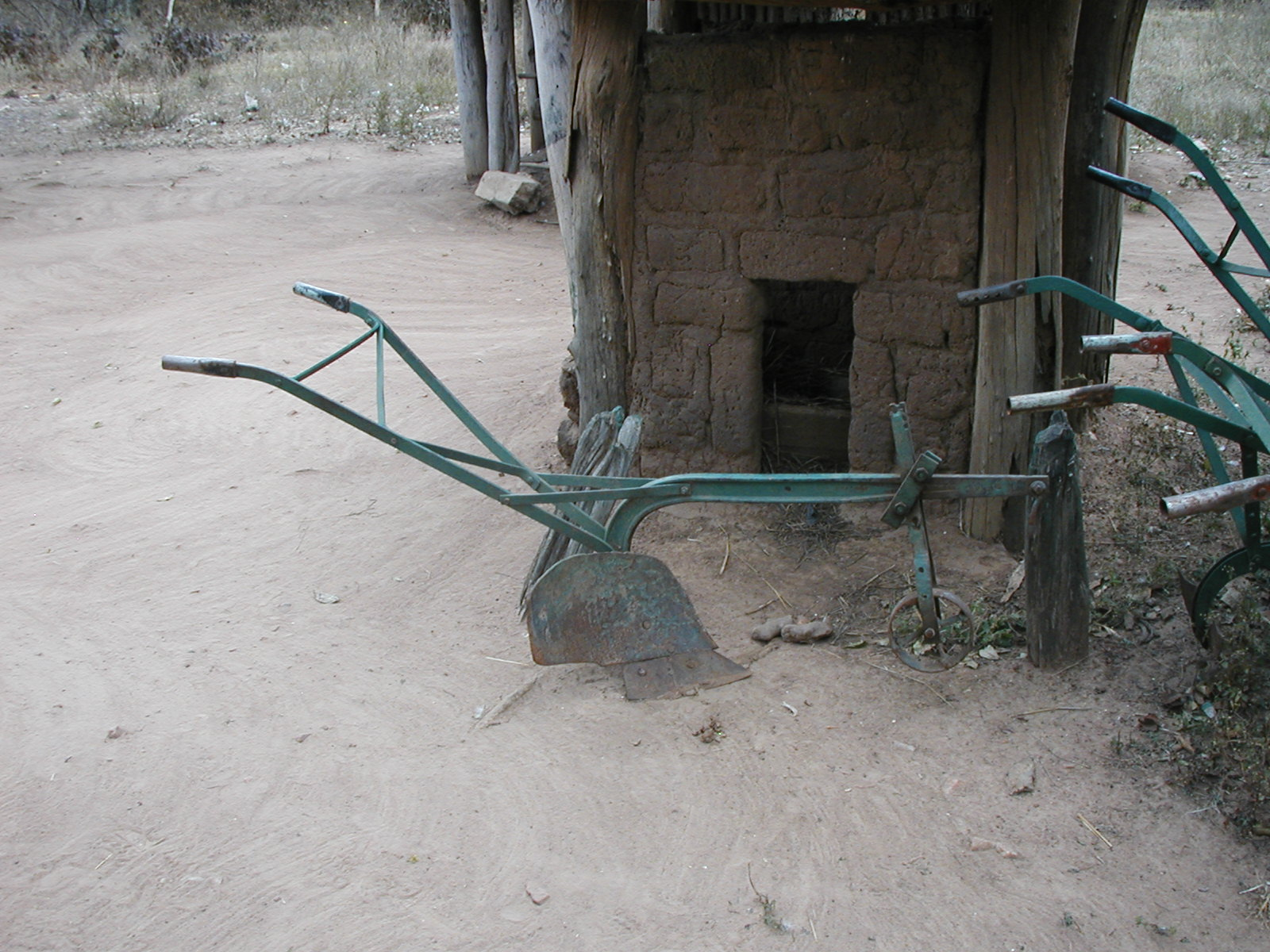
Ransome Victory Plough, Monze, Zambia

Ransome Victory Plough (American spelling "plow") is a type of single-share mouldboard plough commonly used throughout Southern Africa. Introduced into much of Southern Africa in the mid-1920s via European farmers and missionaries, it was quickly adopted over earlier, heavier models that required multiple spans (teams) of oxen. The Ransome Victory's relatively light weight allowed it to be pulled by a single span of oxen, allowing more smallholder farmers who owned fewer cattle to utilize the technology.

The Ransome Victory Plough's most recognizable feature is the vertically adjustable pivot wheel in front of the ploughshare (as opposed to a cutting knife or wheel). This pivot wheel, combined with an offset tension bar to which the chain from the yoke is connected, causes the forward motion of oxen to force the blade into the soil. However, the tension bar is typically far weaker than the main plough beam, and is likely the first part of the plough to break. The difficulty of accessing spare parts causes many farmers to simply chain the oxen to the front of the beam, after which the ploughman must use his own strength to keep the plowshare in the soil. Another notable feature is the relatively short mouldboard, which lessens the amount of draft force necessary to pull the plow.

== History ==
Introduction of the Ransome Victory and its subsequent widespread adoption led to the rapid expansion of agriculture, particularly in the semi-arid regions of Southern Africa. For example, in Northern Rhodesia (now Zambia), the use of the R.V. plough on the Tonga Plateau allowed for a vast expansion in the cultivation of maize by African farmers in the region. This expansion was in large part due to the ability to cultivate exponentially greater amounts of land utilizing the plough, as compared to hand cultivation. The success of maize agriculture was to such an extent that the region eventually gained the moniker "The Breadbasket of Zambia".

== Advantages / disadvantages ==
The advantages of the Ransome Victory plough are that it is relatively cheap ($100–200 USD), allows farmers to cultivate larger areas of land, requires only a single span of oxen to pull, and in wet soils, can be handled by even a youth. It also provides benefits common to all plows, such as burying of weed biomass and loosening of the soil surface. The disadvantages of the Ransome Victory are its relatively shallow draft (20 cm), the fragility of the torsion bar, and the short ploughshare, which tends to leave an uneven, smeared furrow in clayey soils unless well-handled. Furthermore, the Ransome Victory plough is nearly unusable in dry soils, limiting its use until after seasonal rains have sufficiently saturated the soil.

In the context of subsistence farming in Southern Africa, the Ransome Victory plough has the further disadvantage of contributing to soil degradation. For example, in Southern Zambia, annual ploughing of fields without fallowing or subsoiling ("ripping") has led to severe losses of topsoil due to surface erosion. Furthermore, the repeated ploughing at the same depth has caused the formation of hardpans due to the weight of the landside pushing down on the underlying soil. This hardpan restricts water infiltration, limiting the soil's ability to absorb and retain water; it also severely restricts root growth of crops, which in turn has a negative impact on crop yield.

=== Robert Ransome ===
In 1789 Robert Ransome, an iron-founder in Ipswich started casting ploughshares in a disused malting at St Margaret's Ditches. As a result of a mishap in his foundry, a broken mould caused molten metal to come into contact with cold metal, making the metal surface extremely hard – chilled casting – which he advertised as 'self sharpening' ploughs, and received patents for his discovery.
