= Robert Ransome =

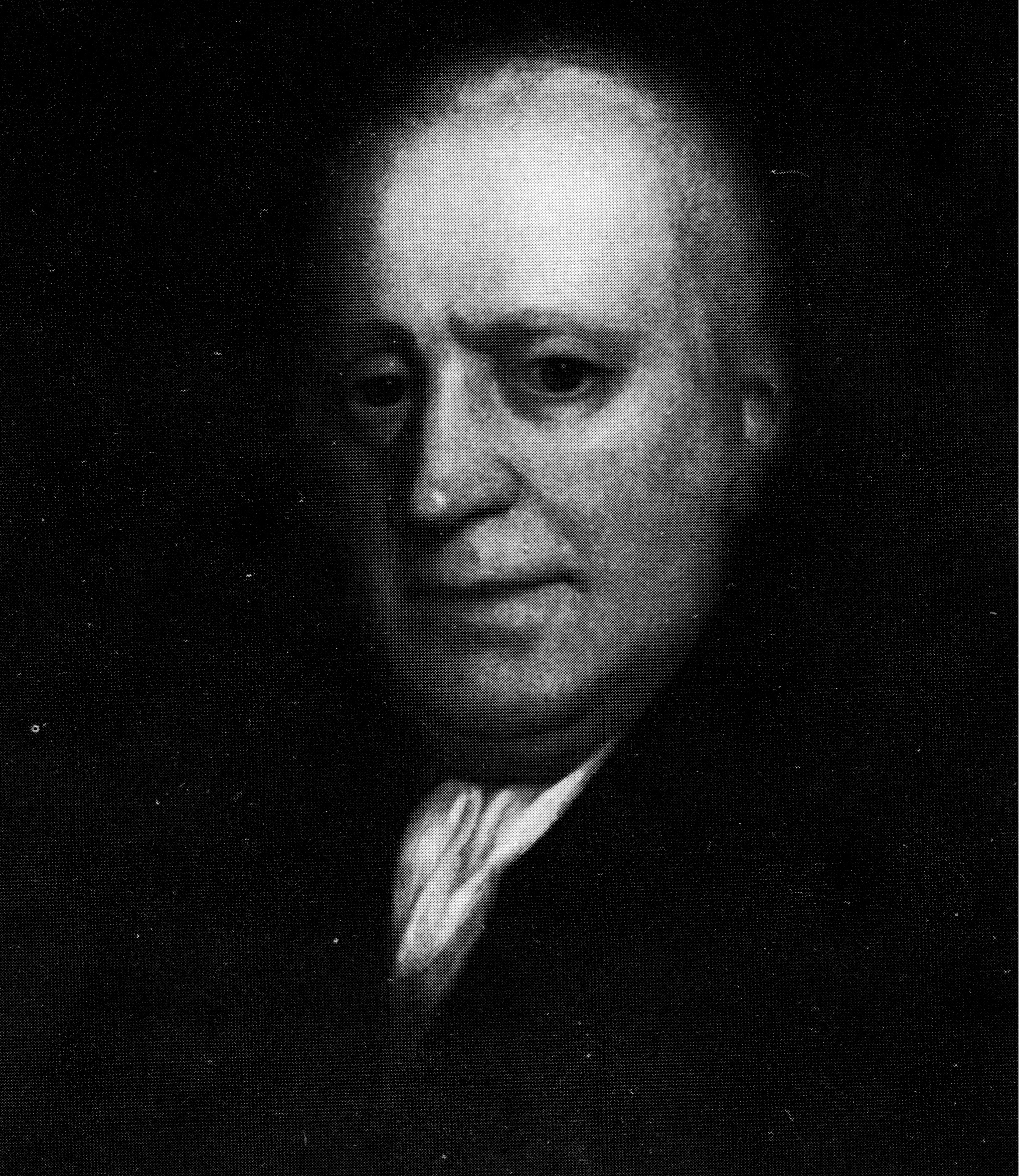
Robert Ransome (1753 – 1830)

Robert Ransome (1753 – 7 March 1830) was an English maker of agricultural implements. He founded the company later known as Ransomes, Sims & Jefferies.

== Early life and career ==
Robert Ransome was born in Wells, Norfolk, son of Richard Ransome, a schoolmaster. His grandfather, Richard Ransome, was a miller of North Walsham, Norfolk, and an early Quaker who suffered frequent imprisonment while on preaching journeys in various parts of England, Ireland, and Holland; he died in Bristol in 1716.

On leaving school Robert was apprenticed to an ironmonger; he later started his own business in Norwich with a small brass-foundry, which afterwards expanded into an iron-foundry near Whitefriars Bridge. He possessed inventive skill, and in 1783 took out a patent for cast iron roofing plates, and published Directions for Laying Ransome's Patent Cast-iron Coverings in 1784. On 18 March 1785 he took out a patent for tempering cast iron ploughshares by wetting the mould with salt water.

== Ipswich ==
In 1789, Ransome moved to Ipswich and rented premises in St Margaret's Ditches and established a foundry there with a single worker, William Rush. On 21 March he announced in the Ipswich Journal that he had cast iron ploughshares for sale, and would buy old cast iron.

In 1803, a chance observation of molten iron cooling on a stone floor led to an important invention in connection with ploughs: the chilling of the underside of ploughshares by casting them on an iron mould, the upper part of the mould being of sand. In this manner the underside of the share was chilled and made harder than steel, while the upper part remained soft and tough. The upper part wearing away faster than the lower, a sharp cutting edge was thus maintained, and less draught required. By the use of these shares the necessity of continually laying and sharpening of wrought iron shares was avoided. This invention was at once adopted.

He took out a further patent on 30 May 1808 for improvements in the wheel and swing ploughs.

Ransome was joined in business by his two sons James Ransome (1782–1849) and Robert (1795–1864), and the firm, known as Ransome & Sons, was one of the earliest to build cast iron bridges, the Stoke Bridge at Ipswich (since replaced) being constructed by them in 1819.

He retired from business in 1825. In his retirement, he learned copperplate engraving, and constructed a telescope for his own use, for which he ground the mirror himself. G B Airy’s first view of the planet Saturn was through this instrument. The later years of his life were spent in Woodbridge, Suffolk, where he died on 7 March 1830.

His grandson James Allen Ransome (son of James Ransome) was a notable partner of the family business, and an agricultural writer.
