= Ransomes, Sims & Jefferies =

British agricultural machinery maker

Ransomes, Sims & Jefferies Limited
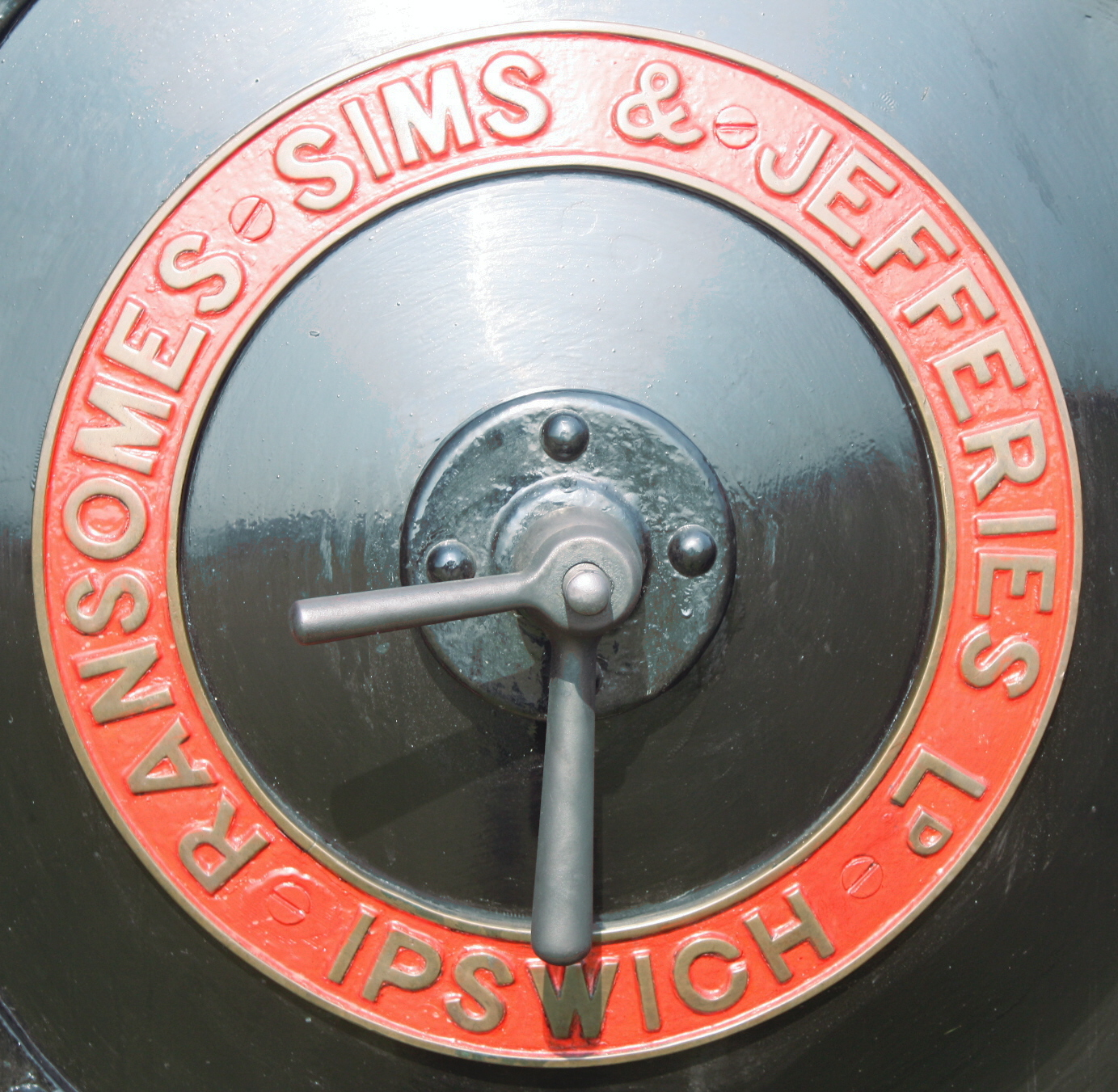
- Company name plate on steam engine boiler
- Type: (from 1911) public listed company
- Industry: Agricultural engineering, General engineering, Manufacturing
- Predecessor: Ransomes partnerships
- Founded: of company 1884, of enterprise before 1789
- Defunct: 1998
- Fate: Taken over
- Successor: Textron Inc.
- Headquarters: Ipswich, England
- Products: Ploughs, Traction engines, Threshing machines, Combine harvesters, Lawn mowers, Trolleybuses, Forklifts etc
- Subsidiaries: Ransomes & Rapier

Ransomes, Sims and Jefferies Limited was a major British agricultural machinery maker also producing a wide range of general engineering products in Ipswich, Suffolk including traction engines, trolleybuses, ploughs, lawn mowers, combine harvesters and other tilling equipment. Ransomes also manufactured Direct Current electric motors in a wide range of sizes, and electric forklift trucks and tractors. They manufactured aeroplanes during the First World War. Their base, specially set up in 1845, was named Orwell Works.

Ransomes' railway equipment business was hived off in 1869 with a different ownership as Ransomes & Rapier and based nearby at Waterside Ironworks.

== History ==
=== 18th century ===
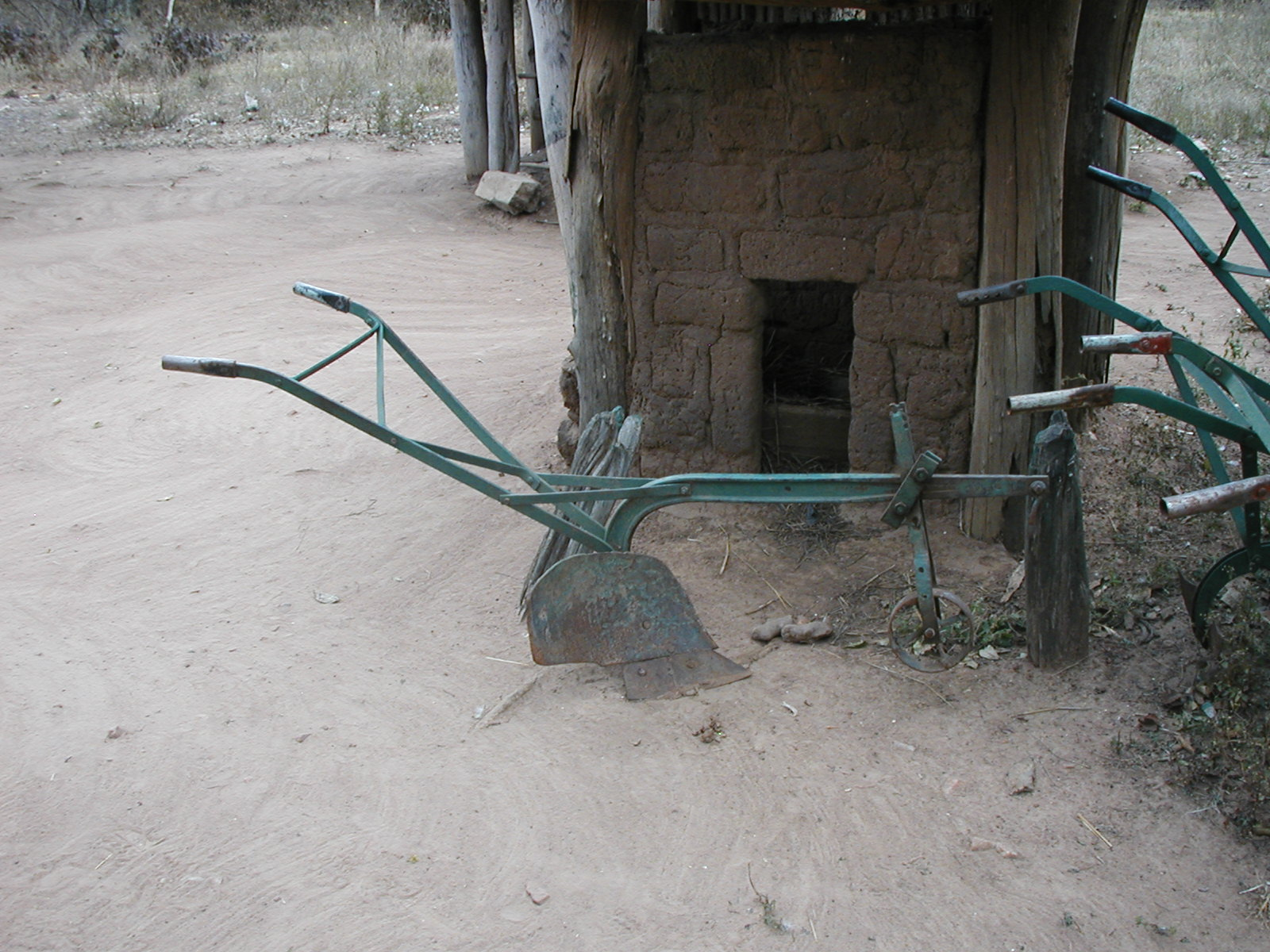
Ransome Victory Plough, Monze, Zambia

The enterprise was started by Robert Ransome (1753–1830), who was born into a Quaker family in Norfolk, and became an apprentice to an ironmonger in Norwich. The Quaker values of frugal living, avoiding debt and keeping regular accounts served him well when he set up one of the first brass and iron foundries in East Anglia near White-Friars Bridge, Norwich. He obtained a patent for iron roofing tiles in 1783, and another for tempered cast iron plough shares some 18 months later. In 1789, he moved with his family and one employee named William Rush to Ipswich, where he started casting ploughshares in a disused malting at St Margaret's Ditches, with capital of £200. It was not an obvious place to go, as the town had been in decline for more than a century, and the Ipswich Corporation was almost insolvent due to huge debts.

The fortunes of Ipswich improved when Commissioners were appointed in 1793 to pave the streets, number the houses, and carry out other public works. It became a garrison town when war with France restarted in the same year, which resulted in increased economic and industrial activity. In 1805, an Act of Parliament was obtained, enabling River Commissioners to be appointed, who were to improve the river, allowing ships to reach the town. Despite a period of social unrest, caused by a really bad winter, high prices for coal, and food riots, Robert's son James Ransome (1782–1849) served his apprenticeship in the foundry, and then moved to Great Yarmouth to start his own business.

As a result of a mishap in his foundry in 1803, when a broken mould caused molten metal to come into contact with cold metal, making the metal surface extremely hard, Robert discovered the process of chilled casting. He used it to refine the manufacture of plough shares, which he advertised as 'self sharpening' ploughs, and obtained a patent for his discovery. His next patent was obtained in 1808, and was for the standardisation of plough fittings, enabling parts to be easily replaced when they wore out.

=== 19th century ===
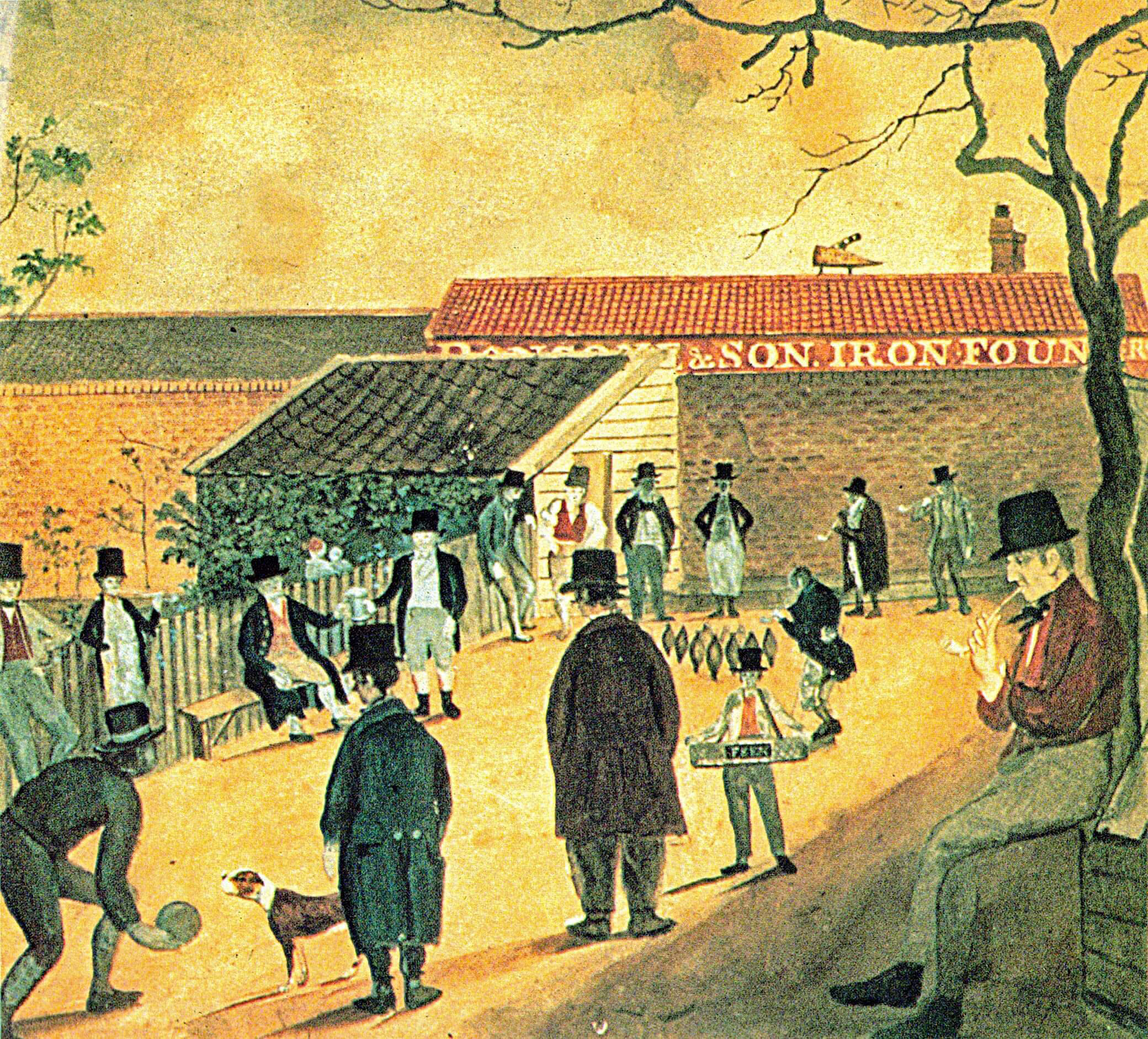
Painting of outdoor bowling near Ransome & Son Iron Foundry, an early embodiment of the company. As the sign says Son in the singular, the painting dates to 1808–1818.

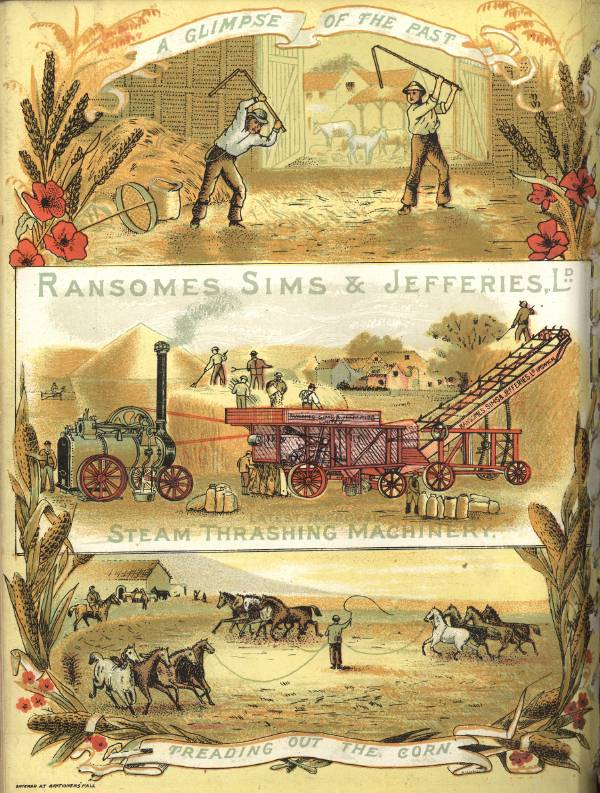
Thrashing machine advertisement c.1885

In 1809 Robert Ransome, now aged 56, was looking for someone younger to take the business forwards. His eldest son James returned from Great Yarmouth to become his father's partner, bringing with him several of his skilled craftsmen. Now called Ransome and Son, the business prospered, with output doubling over the next six years. Another period of social unrest followed, with agricultural depression and the introduction of the Corn Laws in 1815. Robert had employed William Cubitt in 1812 as the company engineer, and they diversified so they were not solely dependent on the sale of agricultural products. They cast the components for Stoke Bridge, Ipswich, which was swept away in a flood in 1818. Cubitt was responsible for the new design, and the bridge lasted for over 100 years. Cubitt's designs for wind-regulating vanes for windmills and a treadmill for grinding corn in prisons were also manufactured, and he then supervised the installation of gas lighting in Ipswich, which included the construction of a gasometer near to the foundry. Cubbitt became a partner in the firm in 1821, but continued to carry out consultancy work in his own right. He was in such demand that he moved on in 1826, to pursue his civil engineering career, for which he was later knighted.

In 1826 James's son known as Allen but technically James Allen Ransome (1806–1875) went to live at Yoxford, Suffolk, where he established a branch of the business. In 1839 Allen Ransome moved from Yoxford to Ipswich and under his direction the firm of J, R & A Ransome (James, Robert and Allen Ransome) was to assume huge proportions. Charles May had joined the company in 1836, and played a major part in the expansion, as he was a brilliant chemist and scientist. In 1837 William Worby the works manager was asked to find a new location for some of the workforce, as the St Margaret's Ditches site was no longer big enough. He found an old shipyard on the eastern bank of the River Orwell, covering 10 acres (4 ha). This became the Orwell Works, and the company embarked on the construction of a dock scheme, to give them over 900 feet (270 m) of quay on the eastern edge of the new wet dock, construction of which had begun in 1837, and continued for some five years. The designer and chief engineer for the wet dock was Henry Robinson Palmer, assisted by James Jones, one of the founder members of the Institution of Civil Engineers. He left the scheme in 1842 to become Ransomes' manager, a position he held until 1852.

After about 1841 the manufacture of ploughs and other agricultural machinery was supplemented by production of portable, traction and other steam engines and thrashing machines.

In the middle decades of the 19th century the company produced heavy iron work for astronomical telescopes, mountings, and observatories.

These included

- The Airy Altazimuth Telescope for the Royal Observatory, Greenwich (1847)
- The dome of Arthur Kett Barclay's observatory in Bury Hill, Dorking, Surrey (1848)
- The Trophy Telescope (1851)
- The Airy Transit Circle for the Royal Observatory, Greenwich (1851)
- The Great Equatorial for the Royal Observatory, Greenwich (1857)

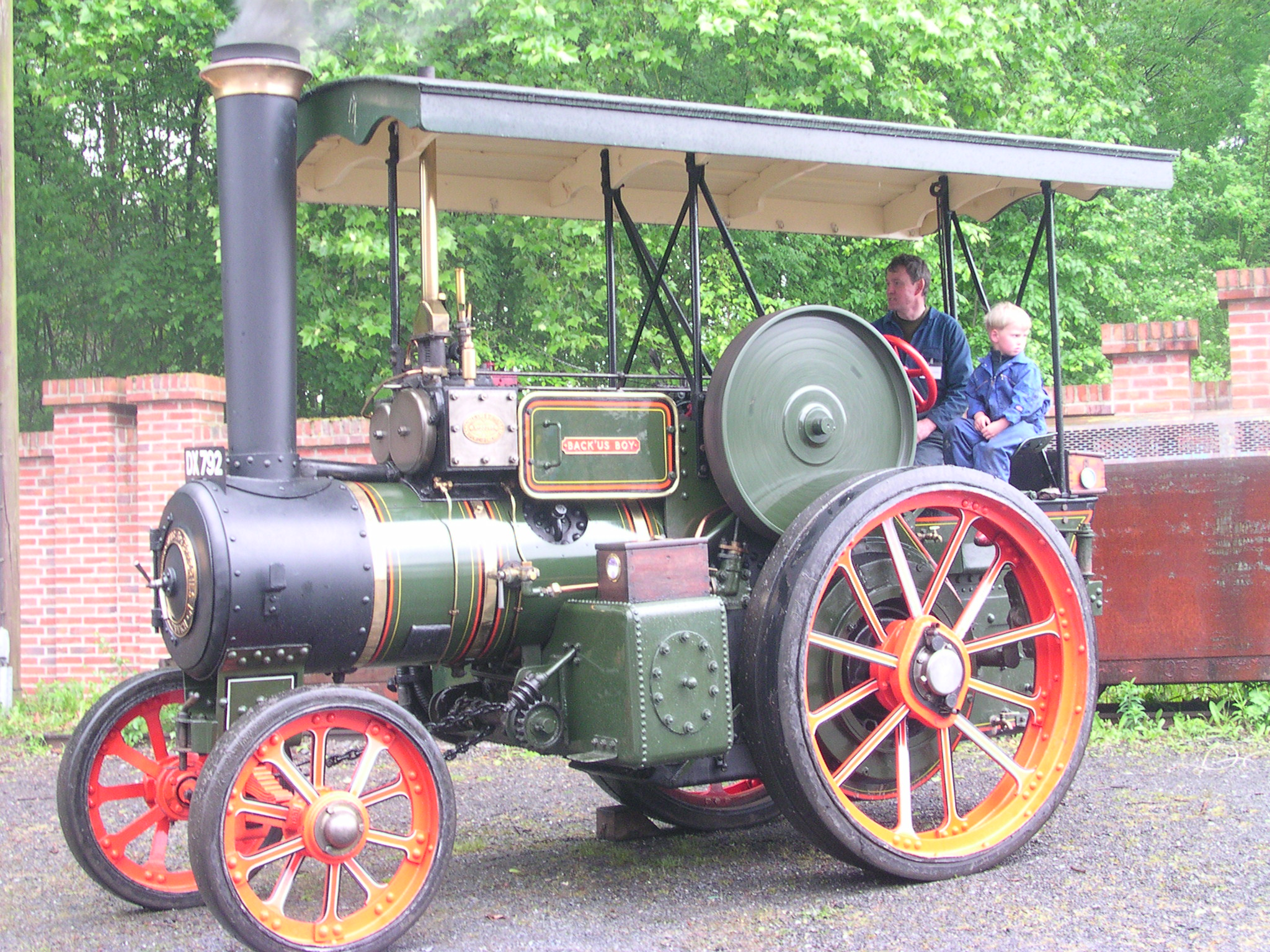
Preserved, 1910-built, 4nhp light steam tractor "Back' us Boy"

In 1851 export trade was initiated which by the early 20th century was more important than the home market and included distributing agencies throughout the world with a branch establishment in Odessa.

In 1869 four engineers, Allen, who remained the senior partner in the parent firm, his elder son R.J. Ransome, R.C. Rapier and A.A. Bennett, took the firm's railway department aside from the parent business and established Ransomes & Rapier at Riverside Works, Ipswich.

An independent factory was set up for the manufacture of lawn mowers of every class Ransomes produced the 'Automaton' hand-powered lawn mower in 1867.

=== 20th century ===
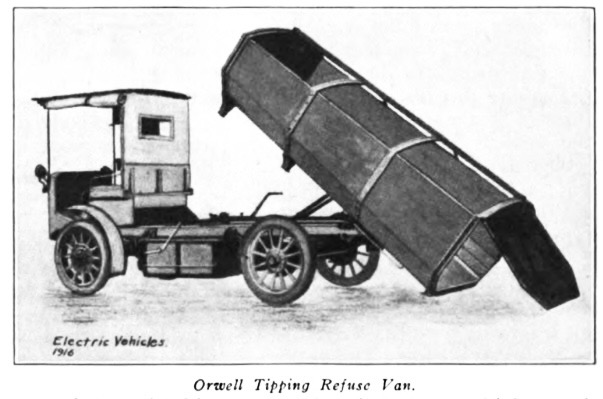
Ransomes "Orwell" (1916)

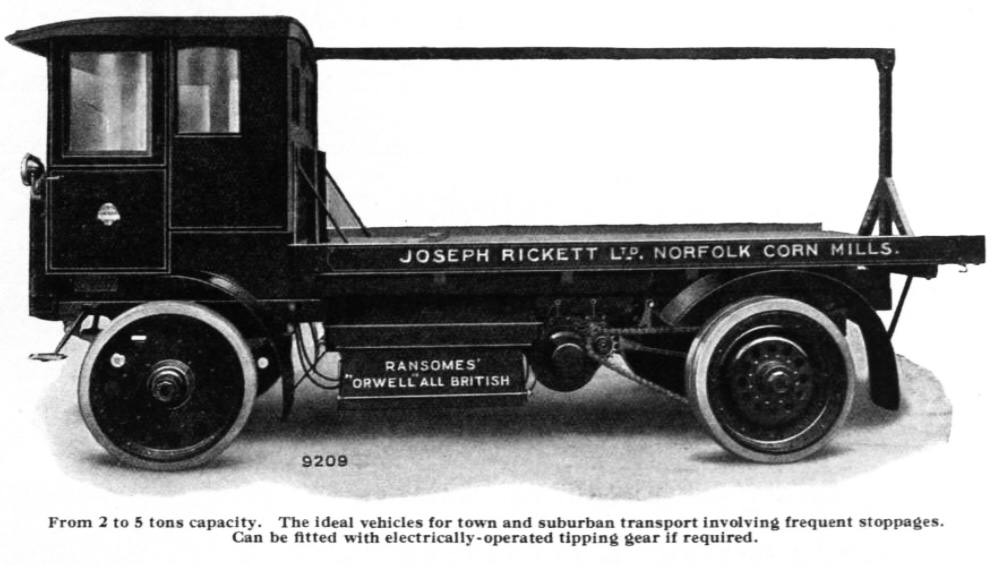
Ransomes electric truck 2-5 t (1925)

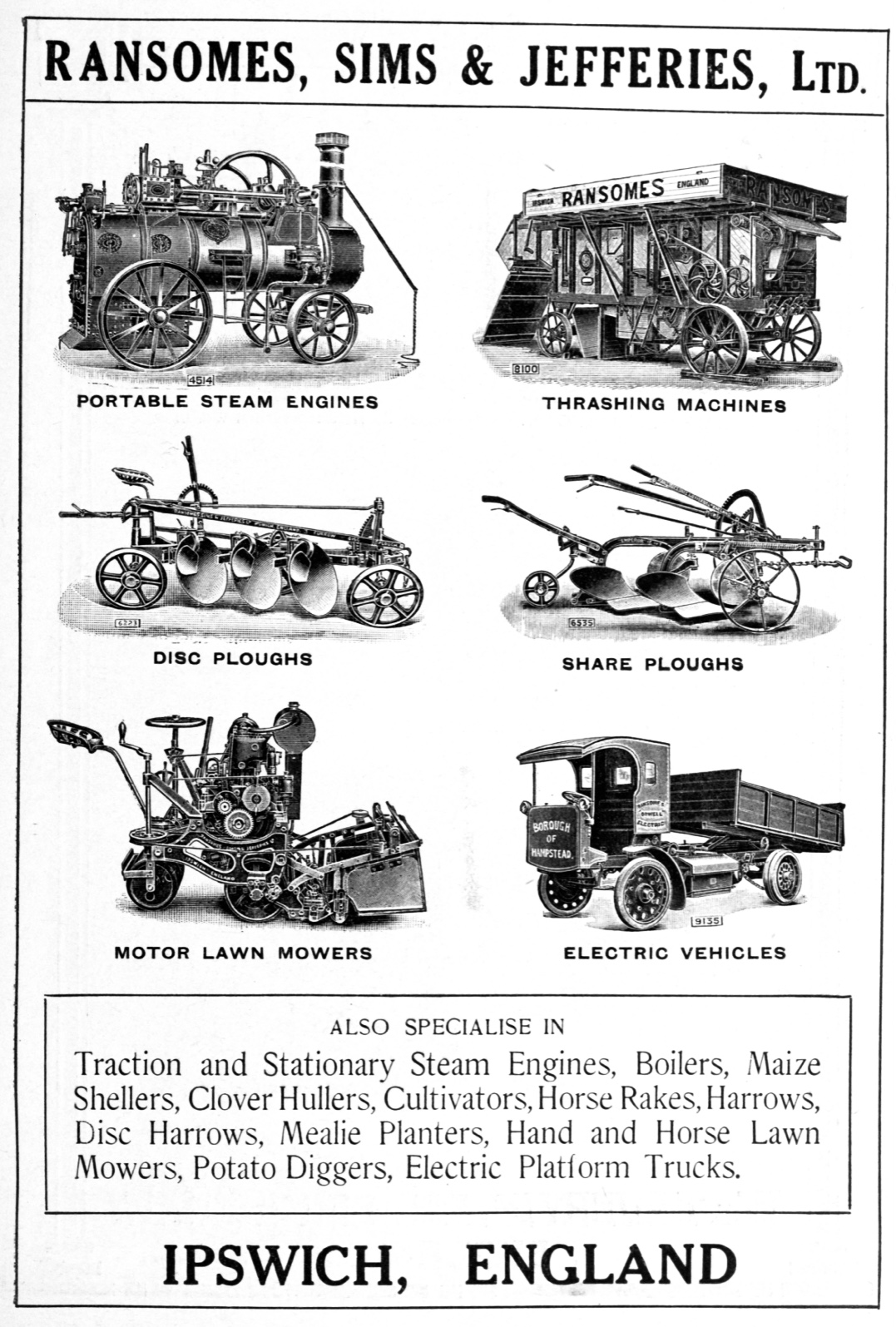
Ransomes, Sims & Jefferies advertisement (1920)

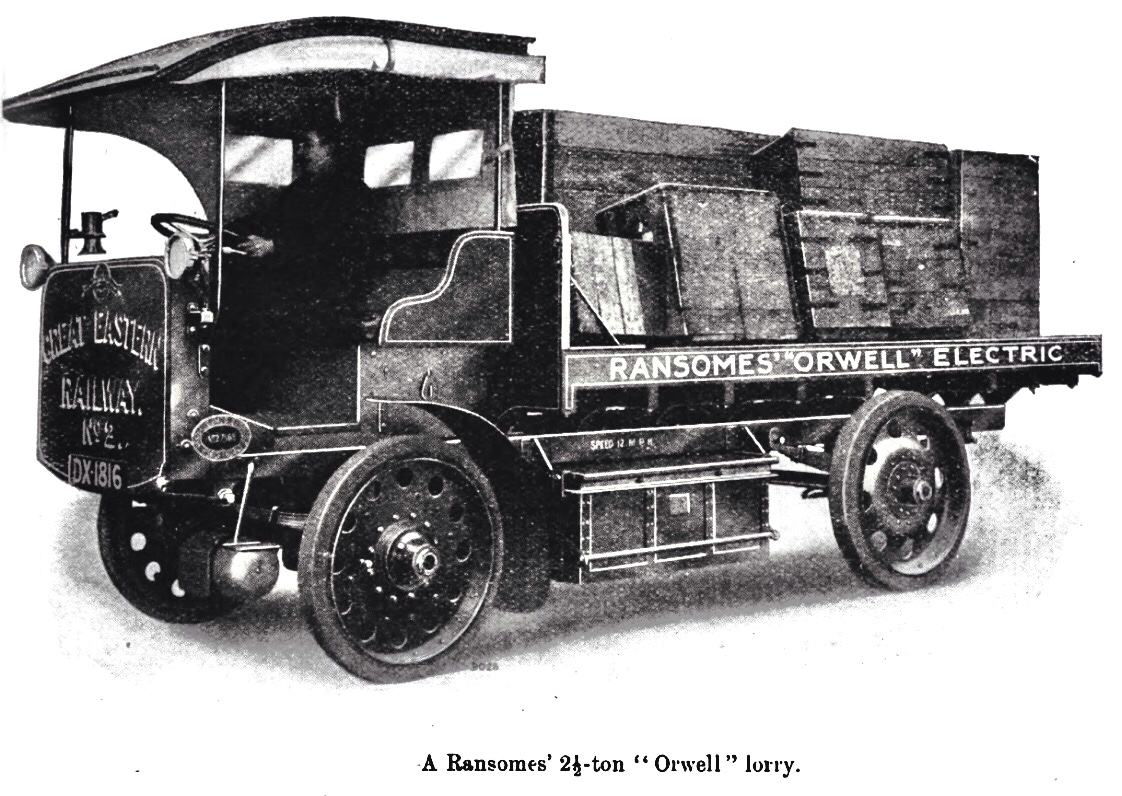
Ransomes "Orwell" 2.5 t

In 1902 Ransomes produced the first commercially available powered lawn mower, driven by an internal combustion petrol engine. In 1910 they won gold medal at the South Russian Regional Agricultural Industrial and Crafts Exhibition for steam thrashing machines and portable steam engines.

During the First World War, they began building "Orwells", a brand of battery-electric commercial road vehicles. They also manufactured aeroplanes, producing 350 Royal Aircraft Factory F.E.2b fighters. These were constructed in a large building occupying 2.5 acres (10,000 m^{2}), while the site at that time contained an administrative block of offices including a large drawing office, and laboratories in which physical, chemical and photo-micrographic testing of materials used in production was carried out. Once the War was over, aeroplane production ceased, and the aeroplane shop was used for the production of Orwell battery lorries from January 1919. In 1924 they added trolleybuses to their portfolio, continuing production of them until 1948, and selling them in Britain and abroad.

In the 1950s Ransomes started producing forklifts, Class 1 Lift Code 5 (Electric Sit Down Counterbalance). With the start of production of the A Series, Ransomes forklifts were sold by the Hyster dealership network under Hyster serial number codes (A21R, A22R, A23R - the R standing for Ransomes Ipswich plant). The codes still show in the Hyster serial number system.

Ransomes also started producing Class 2 Lift Code 3 (Electric Stand On Reach Straddle) machines. Later the company expanded to producing Class 6 Lift Code 1 (Electric Tow Tractors).

When Hyster Corporation bought Lewis Sheppard, the largest market for Ransomes forklifts disappeared. In the early 1980s Ransomes sold their forklift line to Hawkins Mechanical Handling, which produced machines under the Hamech Ransomes brand name. Hawkins Mechanical Handling was later purchased by Crown, and the Hamech name retired, until 2004, when Crown brought it back for use in an Internal Combustion Engined forklift line.

Ransomes also made electric stillage-carrying trucks for use in factories.

In 1989 the whole of the agricultural implement business was sold to Electrolux and merged with their subsidiary Överum.

This left Ransomes solely as a manufacturer of lawn mowers, with the Ransomes, Westwood and Mountfield mower brands. The company accepted a take-over offer from Textron Inc., USA, and their independent existence ended early in 1998. Westwood and Mountfield were later sold in a management buyout.

== Museums and preservation ==
Somewhere in the region of 140 of the company's various steam engines survive in preservation.

The history of the company and preceding businesses is the subject of an exhibition at the Museum of East Anglian Life in Stowmarket, Suffolk and they are also represented in Ipswich Transport Museum.

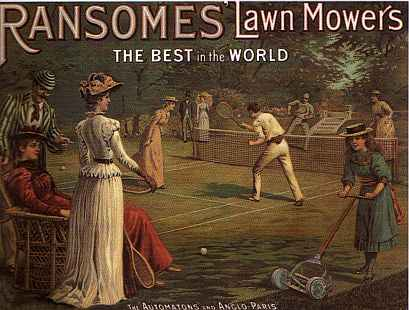
Lawnmower advert

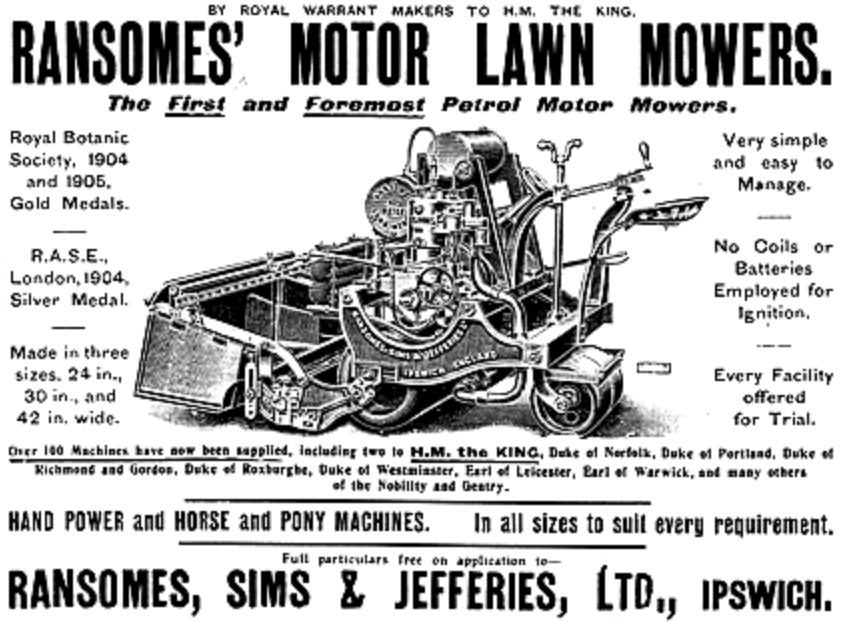
Lawnmower advert

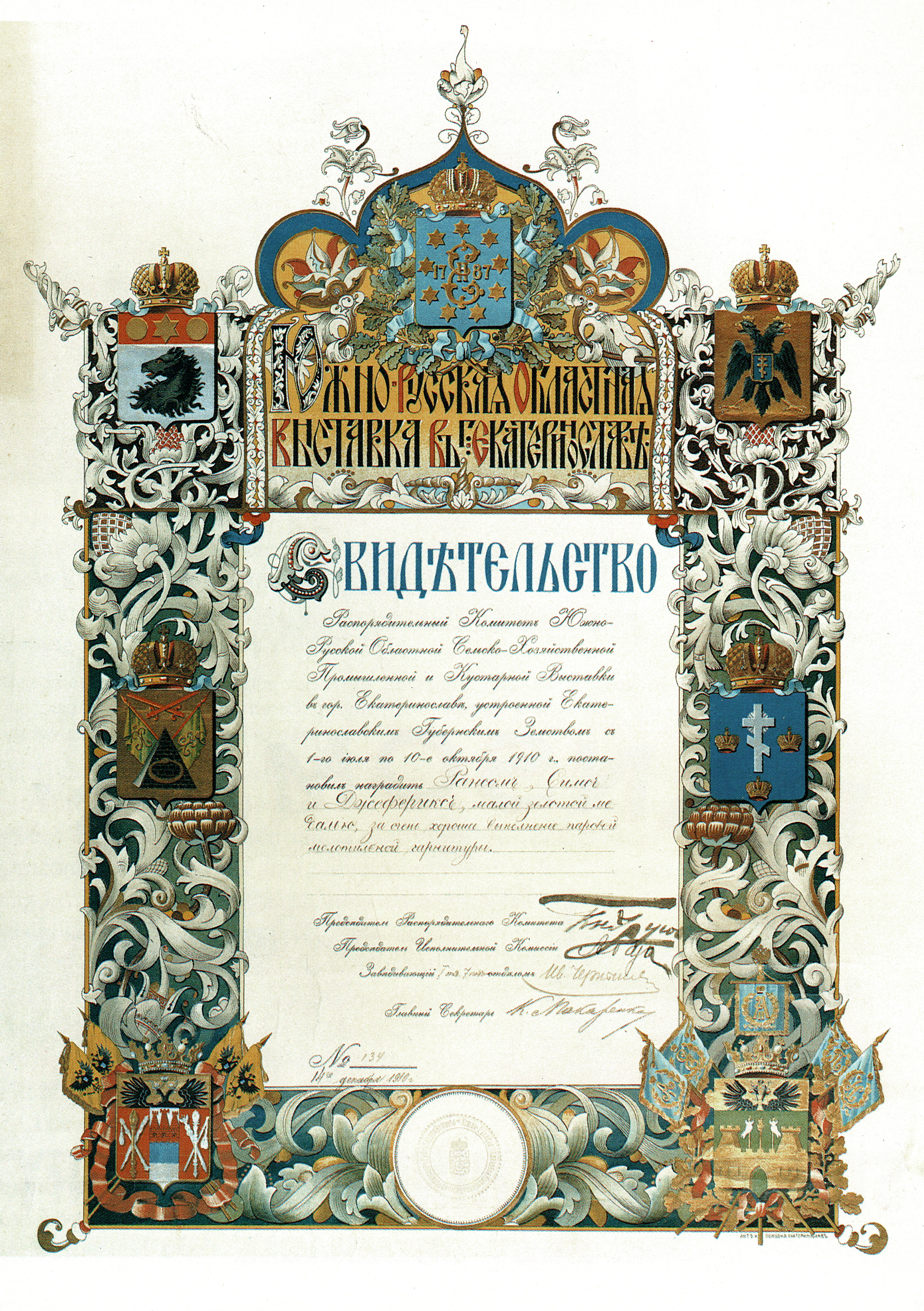
Certificate awarding a gold medal to Ransome, Sims and Jeffries for steam thrashing machines and portable steam engines by the South Russian Regional Agricultural Industrial and Crafts Exhibition, Ekaterinoslav 1910

== Production ==
=== Mowers ===
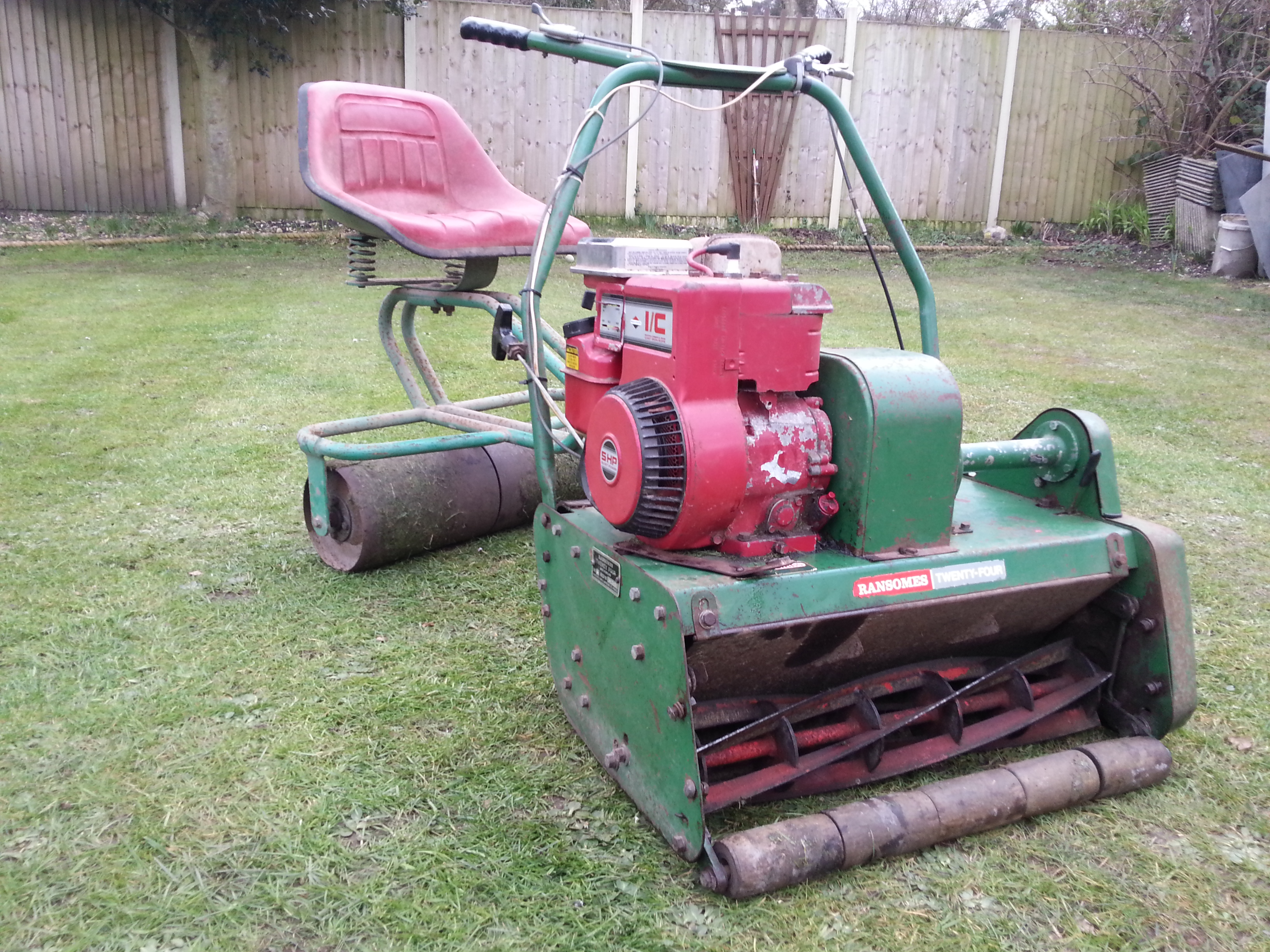
Ransomes 24 MK3 with trailered seat powered by a 5hp Briggs & Stratton I/C engine

Ransomes started producing lawnmowers in 1832, at a time of social unrest when labourers were destroying machinery such as thrashing machines, and agitation for Parliamentary reform meant that some Tory farmers would not buy items made by the Quaker firm of Ransomes. The product had been invented by Edwin Budding of Stroud, and was manufactured under licence. They sold 70 to 80 machines a year for the next two decades.

Ransomes to this day still produce a variety of grass cutting equipment; from machines to industrial gang mowers for use on wider areas such as public parks. They also make a range of pedestrian mowers for use on surfaces such as manicured lawns and bowling greens.

=== Orwell electric vehicles ===
In the 1910s there were a number of electric road vehicles operating in Britain, but most were of American or European, particularly German, manufacture, and with the First World War cutting off supplies from the Continent, Ransomes decided to begin production of a suitable replacement. The construction of the vehicle was quite simple, with an electric motor mounted on a plate, which was attached to the stub axle of each front wheel. Helical gearing then drove the front wheels. 40 batteries were mounted in two panniers, one on either side of the chassis, which could easily be pulled out on a system of rollers, to aid maintenance. The controls were designed to be similar to those on a petrol lorry, with a foot pedal in the clutch position, which disconnected the batteries when pressed down, and reconnected them in three stages when it was released. The brake pedal operated brakes on both of the rear wheels, and the motor speed was controlled by a lever mounted above the steering column, similar to the throttle on petrol-engined vehicles of the time. There were five positions for forward motion, one for reversing, and one for electric braking. In 1916, the vehicles were marketed by Mossay and Co.

In September 1918, it was noted that the only other British manufacturer of electric vehicles was Richard Garrett & Sons of nearby Leiston, although there were two companies selling American imports. However, buying the vehicles was not straightforward, as an application had to be made to the Ministry of Munitions, to obtain a Priority Certificate. They were still subject to restrictions in January 1919, when they asked for a penalty clause to be removed from a contract for supplying vehicles to Ilford UDC, as they were a controlled firm and had no say as to when they could deliver their products. They regularly sold vehicles to local authorities, with many of these sales recorded in the "Wheels of Industry" columns of Commercial Motor magazine. In November 1918 two lorries with automatic tipping bodywork were driven from Ipswich to local authorities in Wolverhampton and Stoke-on-Trent. They proceeded at 9 mph (14 km/h), and were able to find charging points at regular intervals. A delivery to Birmingham in 1919 found that the only place without a proper charging station was Northampton, and a spare battery was used to mitigate that problem.

In September 1919, they were producing four vehicles a week, but the limiting factor was the difficulty in buying the machine tools necessary for manufacture. They were hoping to double that output by the end of the month, and produce 12 vehicles per week shortly afterwards. At the time they were producing two models, a 2.5-ton model with the motors mounted on the front wheels, and a 3.5-ton model where the motors were mounted in the middle of the vehicle and drove the rear wheels though helical reduction gears and roller chains. Both types used regenerative braking, where the motor was driven as a dynamo, which not only slowed the vehicle down, but put power back into the batteries. A standard charging socket was fitted, as approved by the Electric Vehicle Committee, and the vehicle could not be moved while the charging plug was inserted. Tipping bodies were controlled from the cab, and had a central screw which ran parallel to the chassis. Power to the motor was automatically disconnected when the body reaches its highest or lowest extent. The company had been successful in selling to their own local authority, as Ipswich ran a fleet of 13 Ransomes electric vehicles.

For the 1920 motor show, they introduced a new 2.5-ton model where the rear wheels were driven by roller chains, similar to the 3.5-ton model. In 1921 Ransomes produced a 40-seat battery-electric bus for conveying miners between a railway station and the mine entrance in Lancashire. Commercial Motor noted that the seats were not upholstered, as they would soon become dirty and damaged in that application. They also felt there was sufficient interest in Ransomes vehicles to carry a 3-page article on their maintenance in February 1921. By the end of the year, Ransomes had added a 4.5-to-5-ton model to their range, which was similar in construction to the 3.5-ton model. A review of electric vehicle usage by municipalities in 1922 showed that Ransomes were the second most popular type, with some 120 vehicles in operation, only exceeded by the 234 vehicles supplied by Edison of Detroit. By late 1925, the cleaning departments of 40 local authorities were using Ransomes vehicles for the collection of refuse.

In practice, the vehicles proved to be highly reliable. For the Commercial Motor cup, held in 1927, London Wholesale Dairies entered three vehicles into the electric section. They had been driven around 50 miles (80 km) per day, delivering milk to wholesale buyers, doing railway station work, and finally taking empty bottles back to the station. This was achieved by using two crews, and two top-up charges during the day, before full recharging in the evenings. Two of the vehicles were from Ransomes, and had covered 84,000 miles (135,000 km) and 96,000 miles (154,000 km) since delivery. The third vehicle, which won the competition, had covered 150,000 miles (240,000 km) and was made by Edison. One of the vehicles supplied to Ipswich Corporation in 1915 and used constantly since, was still working well in March 1934.

The electrical engineer and pioneer of electric vehicles, Frank Ayton, was a managing director of the company.

=== Trolleybuses ===
In 1923, Ipswich Corporation opened their first trolleybus route in the town, using three vehicles from Railless. Ransomes saw an opportunity opening up on their doorstep, and produced an "improved electric trolleybus". It was based on the Railless design, with a high, straight chassis, but in other respects was simpler. A 35 hp (26 kW) motor powered the back axle through a worm and wheel arrangement. They built their own motors and controllers, which were hand-operated as they were based on those used in trams. They also built their own bodywork, with seats for 30 passengers and a front entrance. After testing, the trolleybus entered public service in Ipswich during 1924. They assessed the vehicle in operation, and then designed a Type C prototype, based on their conclusions. The chassis was lower, enabling the floor level to be 2 feet 2 inches (0.66 m) above the road level, and requiring passengers to negotiate two steps, rather than the three on the first vehicle. This was made possible by moving the motor, this time rated at 40 hp (30 kW), over the front axle. Another significant advance was the replacement of the hand-operated controller with a foot-operated pedal, leaving the driver's hands free to steer the vehicle, use the handbrake and sound the horn. It ran for five months on the Ipswich system from December 1925, and when further vehicles became available, it was fitted with pneumatic tyres, had its entrance moved to the other side, and was sold for use in Poznań, Poland.

Following the trials of the Type C prototype, Ipswich placed an order for 15 Type D trolleybuses, with an entrance forwards of the front axle, and another behind the rear axle, designed for two man operation in peak periods and one man operation at other times. This required the motor to be mounted in the centre of the vehicle, and the floor level was increased to 2 feet 11 inches (0.89 m). They produced a number of variations to suit the needs of individual customers, and in 1928 produced two double-deck vehicles based on the Type D chassis for Nottingham, and a D6 3-axle chassis. As well as fitting their own electrical equipment, they also used equipment from British Thomson-Houston and Allan West if customers required it, but stopped building their own bodywork. The business prospered, and although they sold a total of 123 vehicles to eleven municipal users in Britain, 305 trolleybuses were sold abroad. They also entered into an agreement with the Italian company Stigler some time before 1935, allowing them to build Ransomes-Stigler 3-axle trolleybuses for Milan. These had 24 seats, but could also carry 66 standing passengers.

Overseas customers included the trolleybus systems in Cape Town, who placed an order for 20 single-deck and 30 double-deck vehicles in 1935, Port of Spain in Trinidad and Tobago, George Town, Penang, and Singapore. They sold their last trolleybus in Britain in 1940, when a 2-axle demonstrator built for a tour of South Africa, which was cancelled when the Second World War started, was bought by Ipswich, and their final order in 1948 was for six vehicles for Drammen in Norway, after which they withdrew from the trolleybus market. Ipswich Corporation had bought 66 of their first 86 trolleybuses from Ransomes, and although Ransomes produced a leaflet in 1939 stating that all of the trolleybuses operating in Ipswich had been made by them, this was never actually true. Three Ransomes trolleybuses are known to survive in preservation, two at the Ipswich Transport Museum, who also own the chassis of a fourth, and one at the Science Museum, London's store at Wroughton near Swindon.

== Styles ==
The business begun by Robert Ransome was later owned as partners by various individuals. The different names or styles by which the one enterprise was known before it was bought in 1884 by the limited liability joint-stock company Ransomes, Sims & Jeffries Limited were:

- 1789 Robert Ransome. sole trader on his own account
- 1809 Ransome & Son. Owners Robert (1753–1830) and his son James Ransome (1782–1849)
- 1818 Ransome & Sons. Owners Robert the elder and his sons James and Robert Ransome (1795–1864)
- 1823 J & R Ransome. Owners brothers James and Robert Ransome
- 1830 J R and A Ransome. Owners James and Robert Ransome and James's son Allen (James Allen Ransome) (1806–1875)
- 1835 Ransomes & May. Owners Ransomes and Charles May
- 1852 Ransomes & Sims. Owners Ransomes and William Dillwyn Sims who replaces May
- 1869 Ransomes, Sims & Head. Owners now joined by John Head and as this company exhibited in Lima in 1872. Separate firm Ransomes & Rapier took railway department
- 1881 Ransomes, Head & Jefferies. Owners Robert Charles Ransome, John Head (d. 19 May 1881), James Edward Ransome and John Robert Jefferies (1841–1900)
- 1884 Ransomes, Sims & Jefferies Limited, a limited liability company, was incorporated and it purchased the business from the former partners
- 1911 Public listed company. In June 1911 £250,000 of preference shares were offered to the public and they were listed on the London Stock Exchange

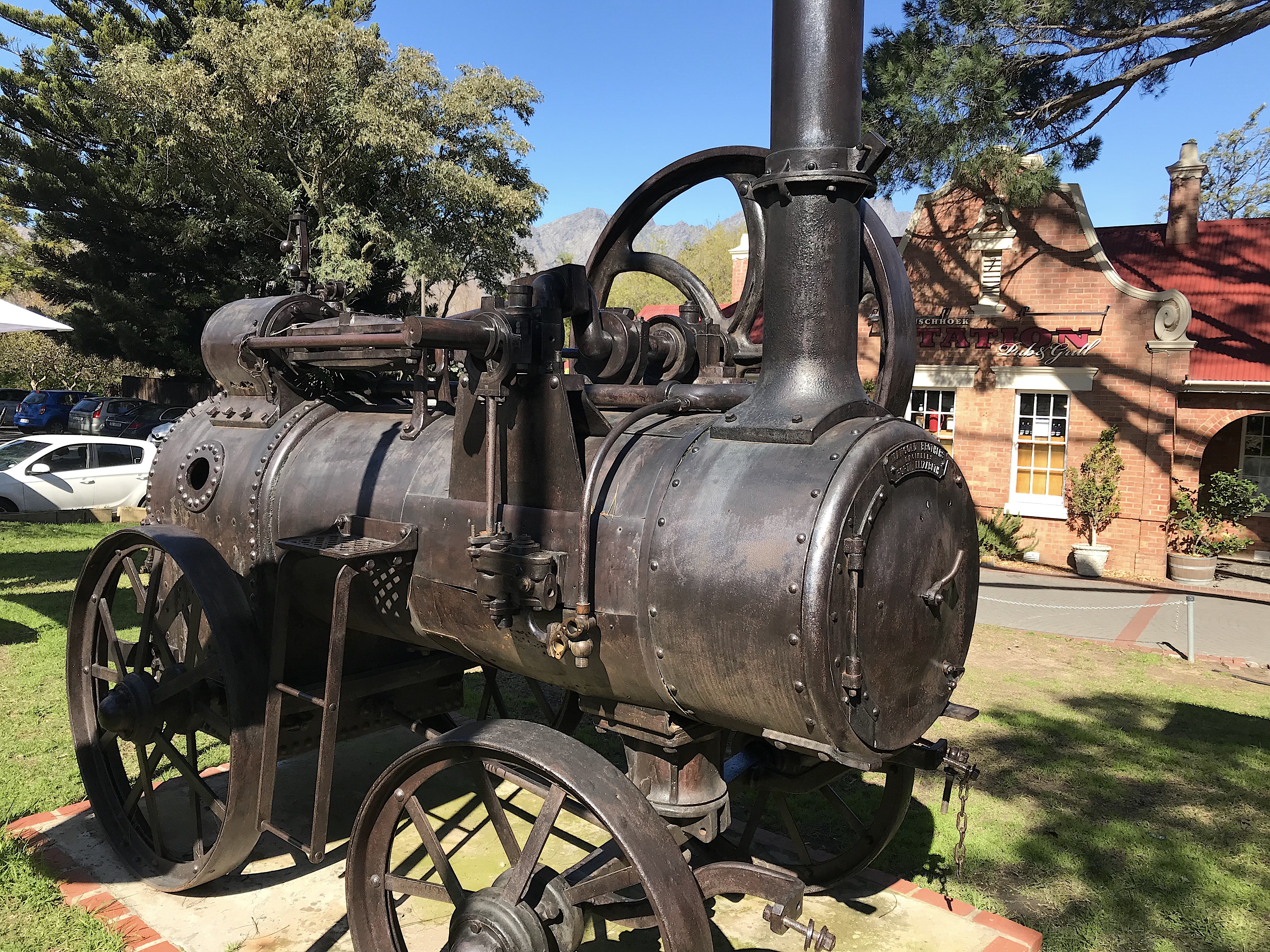
Ransomes, Sims & Jefferies Old steam power engine in a park in Stellenbosch, South Africa

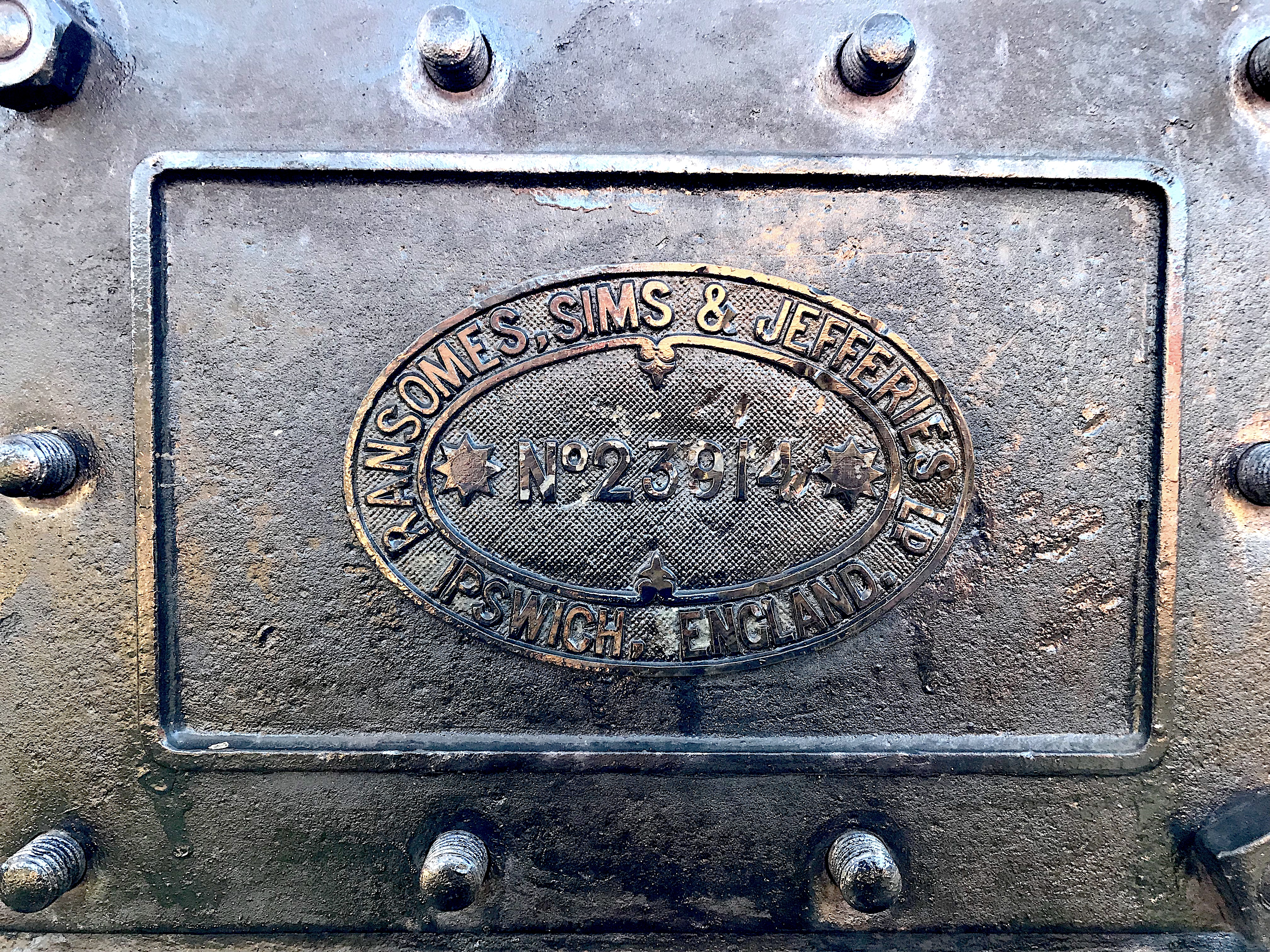
Ransomes, Sims & Jefferies plate with serial number on the steam power engine in Stellenbosch

== Products ==
Ransomes & May 1848 catalogue

- Ploughs
- Scarifiers
- Cultivators
- Rollers
- Clod crushers
- Corn gatherers
- Dag rakes
- Stack stands
- Thrashing machines
- Winnowing machines
- Chaff engines
- Turnip cutters
- Mills

== Publications ==
- "Good Ploughing" by E.J. Roworth, published by Ransomes Sims & Jefferies Ltd. 1973?

== Bibliography ==
- Bell, Brian (2001). Ransomes Sims & Jefferies: Agricultural Engineers. Old Pond Publishing. ISBN 978-1-903366-15-8.
- Goward, Kenneth J (2005). "The Ransomes Connection To Orwell Park Observatory". Archived from the original on 4 April 2008.
- Joyce, J.; King, J. S.; Newman, A. G. (1986). British Trolleybus Systems. London: Ian Allan Publishing. ISBN 978-0-7110-1647-7.
- Lumb, Geoff (1995). British Trolleybuses, 1911-1972. Ian Allan. ISBN 978-0-7110-2347-5.
- Proudfoot, Christopher (2016). "MP065: Ransomes Automaton". The Old Lawnmower Club. Archived from the original on 18 May 2018.
- Skempton, Sir Alec; et al. (2002). A Biographical Dictionary of Civil Engineers in Great Britain and Ireland: Vol 1: 1500 to 1830. Thomas Telford. ISBN 978-0-7277-2939-2.
- Weaver, Carol; Weaver, Michael (1989). Ransomes - A Bicentennial Celebration. Ransomes Sims & Jefferies. ISBN 978-0-9514712-0-3.
- Zebedee, John (2007). "Ipswich Transport Museum". British Trolleybus Society. Archived from the original on 9 January 2017.
