= James Ransome (manufacturer) =

British agricultural machinery manufacturer, died 1849

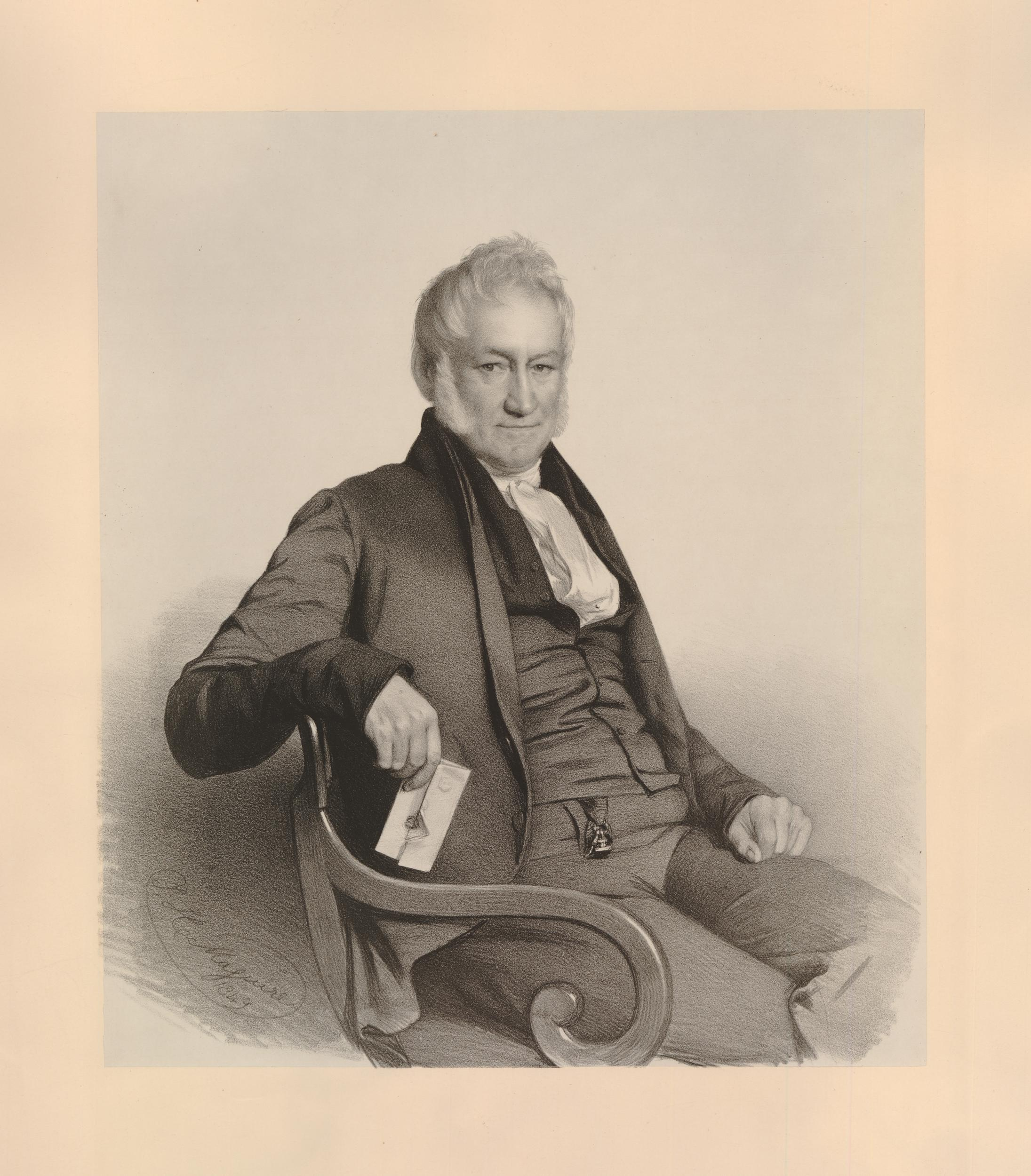
James Ransome

James Ransome (1782 – 22 November 1849) was an English manufacturer of agricultural implements and components for railways.

== Life ==
Ransome was born in 1782, the elder son of Robert Ransome, founder of the manufacturer of agricultural implements (later known as Ransomes, Sims & Jefferies) in Ipswich, Suffolk. He entered his father's business in 1795.

James, with his brother Robert (1795–1864), who became a partner in the business in 1819, took out several patents for improvements in ploughs. Threshing machines, scarifiers, and other agricultural implements were also improved by the firm. James and Robert Ransome were among the earliest members of the Royal Agricultural Society of England, which was founded in 1838, and they gained in later years many of the society's chief medals and prizes.

On the coming of railways, the Ransomes became the largest manufacturers of railway chairs, a patent being obtained for casting them. A patent was also taken out for compressed wood keys and treenails for securing the chairs and rails, and many millions of these were produced.

Ransome died at Rushmere, Ipswich, on 22 November 1849, his wife Hannah, daughter of Samuel Hunton of Southwold, having predeceased him on 8 December 1826. They had several children, including James Allen Ransome (1806–1875), who became a partner in the business in 1829. His daughter Jane was the mother of John Shewell Corder, architect and artist. Another daughter, Hannah Hunton Ransome married Stafford Allen, the quaker abolitionist.
