= James Allen Ransome =

British agricultural-implement maker (1806–1875)

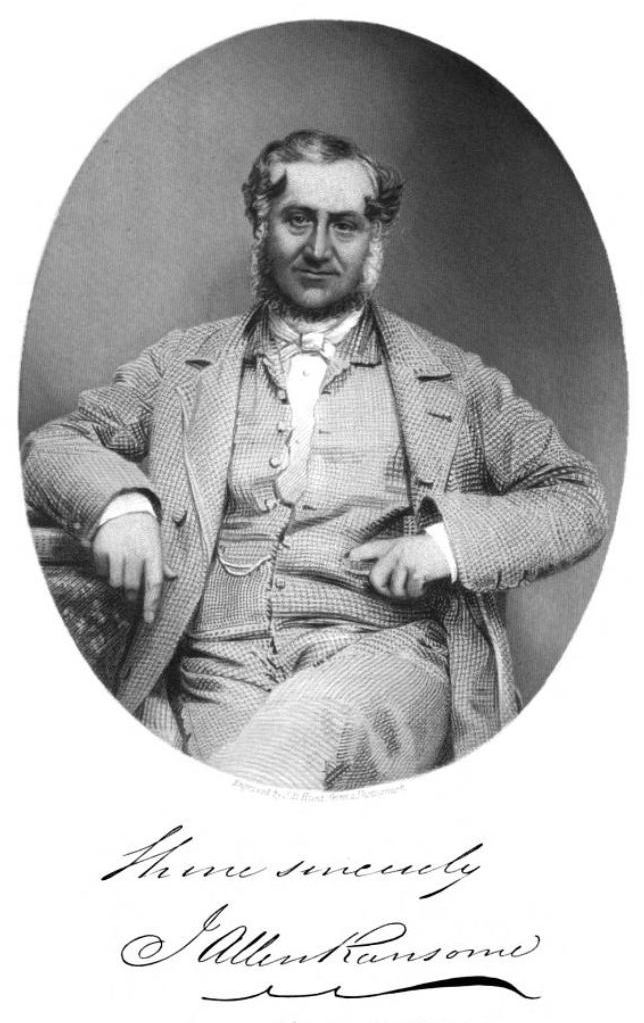
James Allen Ransome

James Allen Ransome (6 July 1806 – 29 August 1875), known as Allen Ransome, was an English agricultural-implement maker and agricultural writer, known for his 1843 publication The Implements of Agriculture.

== Early life ==
James Allen Ransome was born in 1806 in Great Yarmouth, the eldest son of the agricultural-implement maker James Ransome (1782–1849) and his wife Hannah (Née Hunton), and grandson of Robert Ransome (1753–1830), who co-founded Ransomes, Sims & Jefferies. In 1809 the family moved to Ipswich where he completed his education at Colchester in 1820.

== Career ==
After leaving school, he became apprenticed to his grandfather, father, and uncle, who were then carrying on business in Ipswich as Ransome and Sons. From 1826 to 1839, he resided at Yoxford, Suffolk, where a branch of the business was established that he managed. He started a farmers' club there which was the precursor of many similar institutions, notably the Farmers' Club of London, of which Ransome was one of the founders. In 1829, he became partner in the firm then trading under the name J. R. and A. Ransome.

He joined the Royal Agricultural Society in 1838 and served on its council.

In 1839, he moved permanently to Ipswich to reside as one of the leading partners of a firm now known as Ransomes and Sims. Under his direction the business increased in size. In 1843, he published a history of 'The Implements of Agriculture,' part of which had been prepared as a prize essay for the Royal Agricultural Society.

He was described in his obituary as "one of the leaders in a movement which, by bringing the science of the engineer to bear on the manufacture of implements for tilling the ground, has wrought, during the present century, an almost complete revolution in the practice of agriculture."

== Political career ==
Allen was a Councillor for the Ipswich Corporation. He was an alderman of Ipswich from 1865 until his death.

== Personal life and death ==
On 4 September 1828, he married Catherine, daughter of James Neave of Fordingbridge, Hampshire, with whom he had two sons, Robert James and Allen Ransome, and three daughters, one of whom married J. R. Jefferies, an active member of the firm. Catherine died on 17 April 1868.

Ransome died on 29 April 1875 at his house in Carr Street, Ipswich.

== Selected publications ==
- James Allen Ransome. The Implements of Agriculture. J. Ridgway, 1843
- James Allen Ransome. On Principle Strikes Wise & freeman. 1890
