= Frank Ayton =

English electrical engineer

Frank Ayton (10 January 1873, Hexham – 24 January 1956) was an English electrical engineer. He was a pioneer of electric vehicles. He was a founder of the Electrical Vehicle Committee of Great Britain, later the Electric Vehicle Association of Great Britain. He edited the journal Electric Vehicle.

Frank was born in Hexham, Northumberland, and attended the Imperial Service College in Windsor. He then studied at Finsbury Technical College before working for Siemens Brothers in Woolwich. He worked on the Waterloo and City Line before being taken on by Alexander Kennedy to work on various power station and electric traction projects.

Ayton was a member of the Institute of Transport.

Ayton was a managing director of Ransomes, Sims & Jefferies.

== Works ==
- "Electric Vehicles for Brewery Service", Journal of the Institute of Brewing, Vol. 26 No. 3 March 1920 pp 113–133
- "Applications of Engineering to Agriculture", Proceedings of the Institution of Mechanical Engineers, Volume: 111 issue: 1, June 1926, page(s): 683-720
- "The Electric Trolley Bus", The Commercial Motor, 30 October 1928 pp.45-6
