= Yves (given name) =

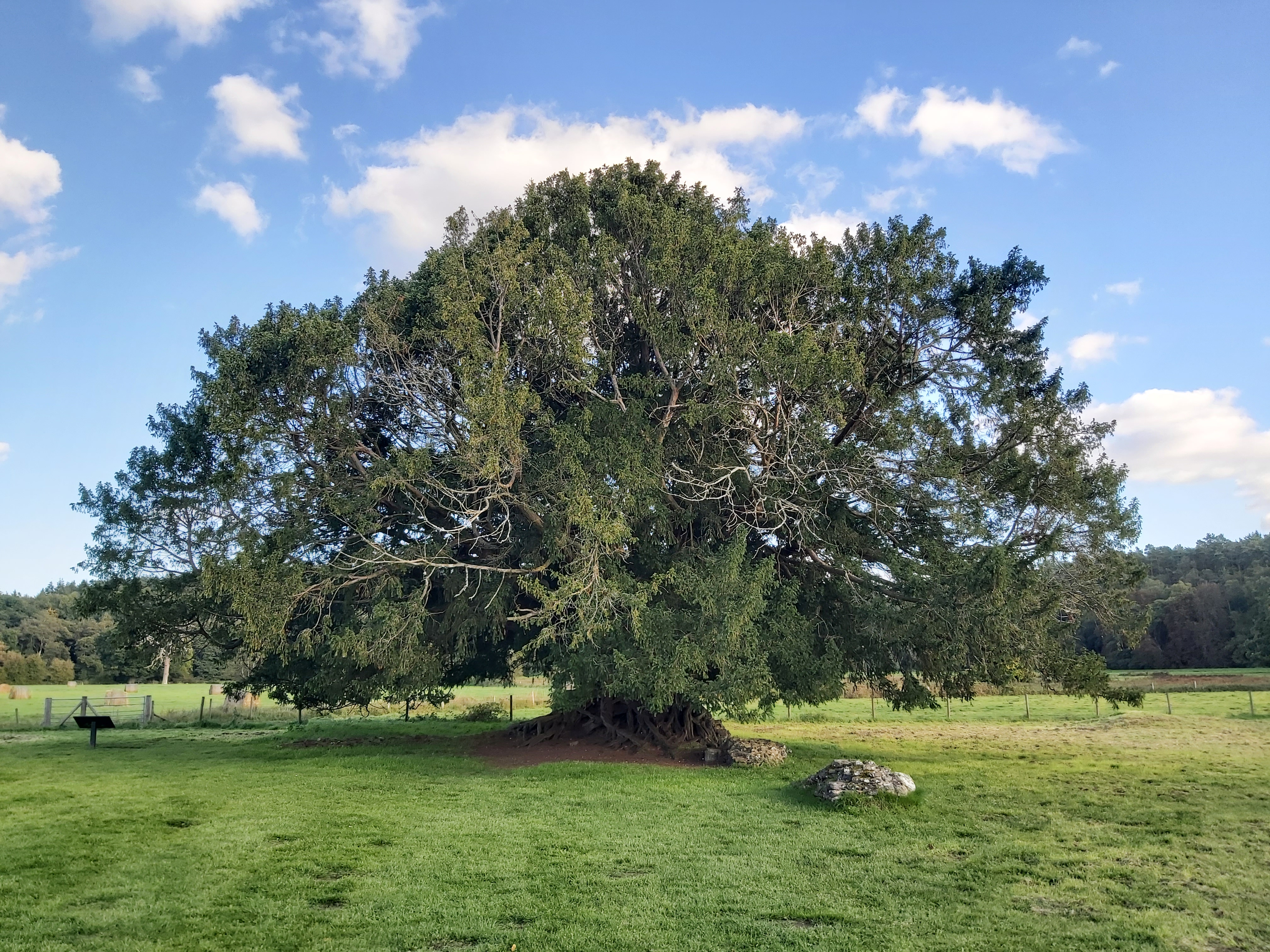
- Yves means yew tree.
- Pronunciation: /ˈiːv/ French: [iv]
- Gender: Male

Origin
- Meaning: yew
- Region of origin: Francophone countries

Other names
- Related names: Erwan, Evette, Ives, Ivet, Iveta, Ivette, Ivo, Iwo, Yvette, Yvo, Yve

Yves (French pronunciation: [iv]; in English as /ˈiːv/ EEV) is a common French male given name of uncertain origin, either from Celtic as in the Gaulish name Ivo (Iuo) and compound names Ivorix (Iuo-rigi or Iue-ricci) and Ivomagus (Iuo-magi), all derived from the Gaulish term for yew, iuos or īuos, or from Germanic, derived from Proto-Germanic *īwaz, *īhwaz (compare Icelandic ýr), masculine variant of *īwō (compare Dutch ijf, German Eibe), from Proto-Indo-European *h₁eyHweh₂, meaning yew. Related names include Erwan[n] (though another etymology has been suggested), Evette, Ives, Ivet, Iveta, Ivette, Ivo, Iwo, Yve, Yvette (the feminine form of Yves), Yvo, Yvon, Yvonne, and many other diminutives (mainly from Brittany).

== People with the given name ==
=== Disambiguation pages ===
- Yves Bélanger
- Yves Durand
- Yves Fortier
- Yves Lapierre
- Yves Michaud
- Yves Simon
- Yves Trudeau

=== Actors ===
- Yves Afonso (1944–2018), French actor
- Yves Barsacq (1931–2015), French film actor
- Yves Beneyton (born 1946), French actor
- Yves Brainville (1914–1993), French film and television actor
- Yves Flores (born 1994), Filipino actor
- Yves Jacques (born 1956), Canadian film, television and stage actor
- Yves Montand (1921–1991), Italian-French singer and actor
- Yves Pignot (born 1946), French actor
- Yves Verhoeven (born 1961), French actor
- Yves Vincent (1921–2016), French film and television actor

=== Artists ===
- Yves Béhar (born 1967), Swiss designer, entrepreneur and an educator
- Pierre-Yves Pelletier, Canadian graphic designer
- Yves Chaland (1957–1990), French cartoonist and writer
- Yves Klein (1928–1962), French artist
- Yves Netzhammer (born 1970), Swiss artist
- Yves Rodier (born 1967), Canadian cartoonist
- Yves Saint Laurent (1936–2008), French fashion designer, namesake of the fashion brand.
- Yves Tanguy (1900–1955), French surrealist painter
- Yves Trudeau (artist) (1930–2017), Canadian sculptor and artist

=== Athletes ===
- Pierre-Yves André (born 1974), French soccer-player
- Yves Allegro (born 1978), Swiss tennis player
- Yves Archambault (born 1952), Canadian ice hockey player
- Yves Beaudoin (born 1965), Canadian ice hockey player
- Yves Bélanger (ice hockey) (born 1952), Canadian ice hockey player
- Yves Bissouma (born 1996), Malian soccer-player
- Yves Colleu (born 1961), French soccer-player
- Yves Deroff (born 1978), French soccer-player
- Yves Dignadice, Filipino basketball player
- Yves Dimier (born 1969), French alpine skier
- Yves Dreyfus (1931–2021), French Olympic medalist épée fencer
- Yves du Manoir (1904–1928), French rugby player
- Yves Dupont (1908–1991), French soccer-player
- Yves Edwards (born 1976), Bahamian mixed martial arts fighter
- Yves Giraud-Cabantous (1904–1973), French racing driver
- Yves Herbet (born 1945), French soccer-player and manager
- Yves Lampaert (born 1991), Belgian cyclist
- Yves Ma-Kalambay (born 1986), Belgian soccer-player
- Yves Mankel (born 1970), German luger
- Yves Missi (born 2004), Belgian-Cameroonian basketball player
- Yves Parlier (born 1960), French sailor
- Yves Racine (born 1969), Canadian ice hockey player
- Yves Rogers (born 1989), Dutch basketball player
- Yves Saint-Martin (born 1941), French jockey
- Yves Sarault (born 1972), Canadian ice hockey player
- Yves Tavernier (born 1962), French alpine skier
- Yves Triantafyllos, French-Greek soccer-player
- Yves Vanderhaeghe (born 1970), Belgian soccer-player

=== Business people ===
- Yves Béhar (born 1967), Swiss designer, entrepreneur, and educator
- Yves Fortier (born 1935), Canadian lawyer, diplomat, and businessman
- Yves Guillemot, co-founder and CEO of Ubisoft
- Yves Lamoureux, software entrepreneur
- Yves Rocher (1930–2009), French cosmetics entrepreneur

=== Directors ===
- Yves Allégret (1907–1987), French film director
- Yves Boisset (1939–2025), French film director
- Yves Caumon (born 1964), French film director
- Yves Ciampi (1921–1982), French film director
- Yves Lavandier (born 1959), French film director
- Yves Montand Niyongabo, Rwandan film director
- Yves Pelletier (born 1961), Canadian director, actor, and comedian
- Yves Robert (1920–2002), French director, actor, screenwriter, and producer
- Yves Simoneau (born 1955), Canadian television director

=== Economists ===
- Yves Balasko (born 1945), French economist
- Yves Guyot (1843–1928), French economist and politician

=== Lawyers ===
- St. Yves or Ivo of Chartres (1040–1114), French canon lawyer
- St. Yves or Ivo of Kermartin (1253–1303), Breton lawyer and priest, patron saint of lawyers and of Brittany
- Yves Bot (1947–2019), French magistrate
- Yves Lainé (born 1937), French lawyer and politician
- Yves Pratte (1925–1988), Canadian lawyer and jurist

=== Musicians ===
- Yves (singer) (born 1997), stage name of Ha Soo-young, of the South Korean girl group Loona
- Yves Daoust (born 1946), Canadian composer and pianist
- Yves Deruyter, Belgian DJ and artist
- Yves Duteil (born 1949), singer, songwriter, and politician
- Yves Nat (1890–1956), French composer and pianist
- Yves Passarell (born 1969), Brazilian songwriter and guitarist
- Yves Prin (born 1933), French composer, conductor, and pianist
- Yves V (born Yves Van Geertsom in 1981), Belgian DJ and artist
- DJ Whoo Kid (born Yves Mondesir in 1957), American DJ
- Yves Tumor (born Sean Bowie), American music producer

=== Politicians ===
- José Yves Limantour (1854–1935), Mexican politician, former Mexican Secretary of Finance
- Yves-Marie Adeline (born 1960), French politician
- Yves Bouthillier (1901–1977), French politician, former French Minister of Finance
- Yves Cochet, French politician
- Yves Ducharme (born 1958), Canadian politician and mayor
- Yves Fauqueur (born 1948), prefect of Saint Pierre and Miquelon
- Yves Guérin-Sérac, French politician and activist
- Yves Lacoste (born 1929), French geographer and geopolitician
- Yves Lessard (born 1943), Canadian politician
- Yves Leterme (born 1960), Belgian politician
- Yves Michaud (politician) (born 1930), Canadian politician in Quebec
- Yves Prévost (1908–1997), Canadian politician and lawyer
- Yves Rocheleau (born 1944), Canadian politician
- Yves Séguin (born 1951), Canadian politician
- Yves-François Blanchet (born 1965), Canadian politician

=== Scientists ===
- Jacques-Yves Cousteau (1910–1997), French explorer, scientist and researcher
- Yves Aubry, Canadian ornithologist
- Yves Chauvin (1930–2015), French chemist
- Yves Colin de Verdière, French mathematician and physicist
- Yves Coppens (1934–2022), French anthropologist
- Yves Delage (1854–1920), French zoologist
- Yves Fortier (geologist) (1914–2014), Canadian geologist
- Yves Hemedinger (born 1965), French politician
- Yves Lambert (1936–2021), French aerospace engineer
- Yves Laszlo, French mathematician
- Yves Marie André (1675–1764), French mathematician and essayist
- Yves Meyer (born 1939), French mathematician and scientist
- Yves Morin (born 1929), Canadian cardiologist, physician, scientist, and former Senator
- Yves Rocard (1903–1992), French physicist

=== Writers ===
- Frédéric-Yves Jeannet (born 1959), French novelist, critic, and interviewer
- Yves Beauchemin (born 1941), Canadian novelist
- Yves Bonnefoy (1923–2016), French poet and essayist
- Yves Engler, Canadian writer and political activist
- Yves Frémion (born 1940), French science fiction writer
- Yves Meynard (born 1964), Canadian science fiction and fantasy writer
- Yves Thériault (1915–1983), Canadian writer
- Yves Urvoy, French historian and writer
- Yves Smith, American author

=== Other professions ===
- Alexandre Saint-Yves d'Alveydre (1842–1909), French occultist
- Yves F. Barbaza (1893–1971), French World War I flying ace
- Yves Brunier (1962–1991), French landscape architect
- Yves Chaudron, French art forger
- Yves Congar (1904–1995), French Dominican priest and theologian
- Yves Gagnon, Canadian ambassador to Argentina and Paraguay
- Yves Godard (1911–1975), French soldier
- Yves Le Prieur (1885–1963), French inventor and military man
- Yves Leopold Germain Gaston, French patriarch
- Yves-Joseph de Kerguelen-Trémarec (1734–1797), French Navy officer, namesake of Kerguelen Islands
- Yves Mourousi (1942–1998), French journalist and news presenter
- Yves Pouliquen (1931–2020), French doctor
- Yves Rossy (born 1959), Swiss pilot and inventor
- Yves Rousseau, French inventor and aviator
- Yves Simon (philosopher) (1903–1961), French Catholic philosopher
- Yves Trudeau (biker) (1946–2008), prolific Canadian serial killer, mass murderer, and Hells Angel

== Fictional characters ==
- Yves Adele Harlow, a character in The X-Files
- Yves Massarde, character in the Clive Cussler novel and film Sahara
- Yves, a criminal cat in a recurring sketch in the latter episodes of Dog City
- Yves Benedict, a character in Julia Golding's Finding Sky trilogy

== See also ==
- Jean-Yves
- Erwan
