= Sailing at the 1972 Summer Olympics – Soling =

Soling at the Games of the XX Olympiad
- Line drawing of the Soling
- Venue: Kiel-Schilksee (Olympiazentrum)
- Dates: First race: 29 August 1972; Last race: 8 September 1972
- Competitors: 80 from 26 nations
- Teams: 26

Medalists
1st place, gold medalist(s)		Buddy Melges; William Bentsen; William Allen	United States
2nd place, silver medalist(s)		Stig Wennerström; Bo Knape; Stefan Krook	Sweden
3rd place, bronze medalist(s)		David Miller; John Ekels; Paul Côté	Canada

The Soling was a sailing event on the Sailing at the 1972 Summer Olympics program in Kiel-Schilksee. Seven races were scheduled. Only six races were sailed due to weather conditions. 80 sailors, on 26 boats, from 26 nations competed.

== Race schedule ==
Because of insufficient wind the scheduled race in the Soling was postponed on 5 September 1972. Due to the interruption of the Games on 6 September 1972 because of the Munich massacre, the race was postponed till 7 September. On that date, the race conditions were unsuitable. Heavy fog and poor wind conditions made it impossible to race until 8 September. Finally for the Soling only six regattas took place. The medal ceremony was also postponed until 8 September.

●	Event competitions	●	Event finals

Date	August						September										
Date	26th Sat	27th Sun	28th Mon	29th Tue	30th Wed	31st Thu	1st Fri	2nd Sat	3rd Sun	4th Mon	5th Tue	6th Wed	7th Thu	8th Fri	9th Sat	10th Sun	11th Mon
Soling (planning)				●	●	●	●	Spare day	Spare day	●	●	●	Spare day	Spare day			
Soling (actual)				●	●	●	●	Spare day	Spare day	●	No wind		Fog	●			

== Course area and course configuration ==
For the Soling course, area A (Alpha) was used. The location (54°29'50'’N, 10°22'00'’E) points to the center of the 2 nm radius circle. The distance between mark 1 and 3 was about 2nm.

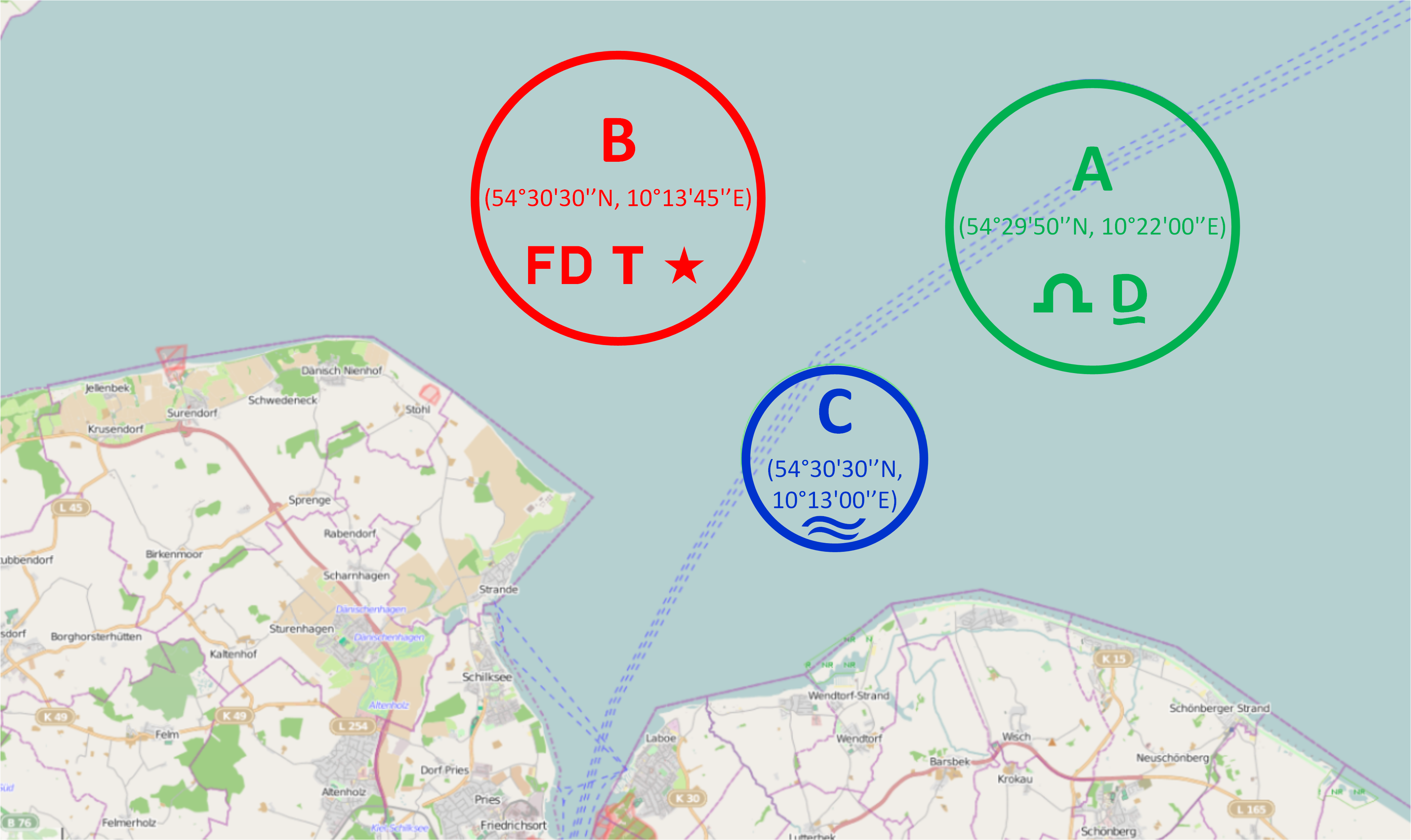

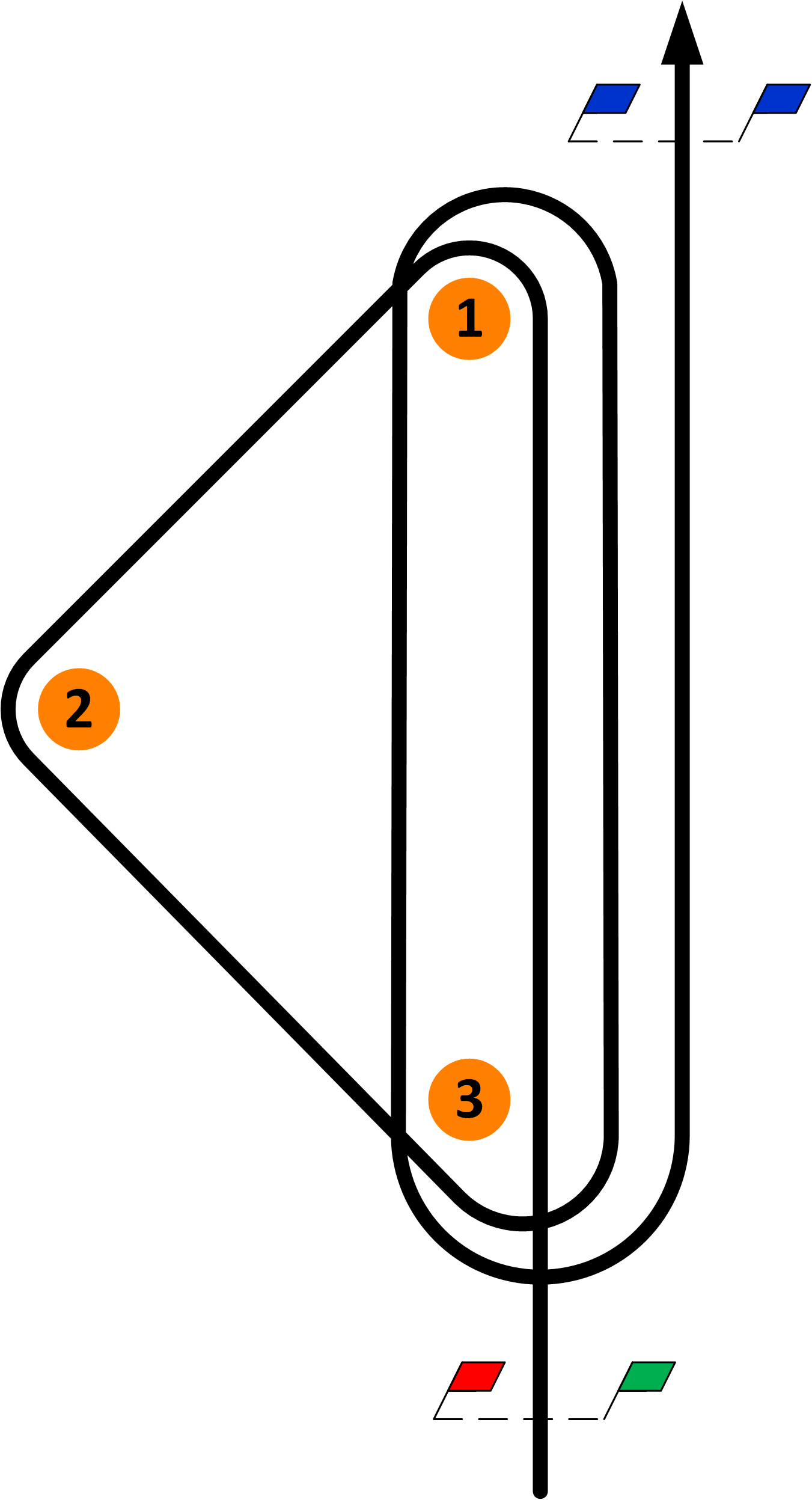

== Final results ==
These are the results of the Soling event.

Rank	Country	Helmsman	Crew	Race 1		Race 2		Race 3		Race 4		Race 5		Race 6		Total	Total – discard
Rank	Country	Helmsman	Crew	Pos.	Pts.	Pos.	Pts.	Pos.	Pts.	Pos.	Pts.	Pos.	Pts.	Pos.	Pts.	Total	Total – discard
1st place, gold medalist(s)	United States	Buddy Melges	William Bentsen; William Allen	1	0.0	2	3.0	3	5.7	~~4~~	~~8.0~~	1	0.0	1	0.0	16.7	8.7
2nd place, silver medalist(s)	Sweden	Stig Wennerström	Stefan Krook; Lennart Roslund Race 1 - 4 Bo Knape Race 5 & 6	2	3.0	1	0.0	~~16~~	~~22.0~~	8	14.0	2	3.0	6	11.7	52.7	31.7
3rd place, bronze medalist(s)	Canada	David Miller	John Ekels; Paul Côté	3	5.7	3	5.7	8	14.0	3	5.7	10	16.0	~~15~~	~~21.0~~	68.1	47.1
4	France	Bertrand Cheret, first two races Jean-Marie le Guillou, last four races	Bernard Drubay; Jean-Yves Pellerin	11	17.0	4	8.0	11	17.0	2	3.0	~~DSQ~~	~~35.0~~	4	8.0	88.0	53.0
5	Great Britain	John Oakeley	Charles Reynolds; Barry Dunning	~~20~~	~~26.0~~	11	17.0	9	15.0	1	0.0	3	5.7	11	17.0	80.7	54.7
6	Brazil	Axel Schmidt	Patrick Mascarenhas; Erik Schmidt	5	10.0	9	15.0	4	8.0	14	20.0	6	11.7	~~17~~	~~23.0~~	87.7	64.7
7	Soviet Union	Timir Pinegin	Valentin Zamotaykin; Rais Galimov	8	14.0	7	13.0	7	13.0	5	10.0	~~17~~	~~23.0~~	9	15.0	88.0	65.0
8	Poland	Zygfryd Perlicki	Józef Błaszczyk; Stanisław Stefański	~~19~~	~~10.0~~	14	20.0	5	10.0	9	15.0	5	10.0	14	20.0	100.0	75.0
9	Spain	Ramón Balcells Rodón	Ramón Balcells; Juan Llort	9	15.0	~~23~~	~~29.0~~	2	3.0	10	16.0	12	18.0	18	24.0	105.0	76.0
10	Norway	Crownprince Harald	Eirik Johannessen; Rolf Lund	6	11.7	12	18.0	18	24.0	~~19~~	~~25.0~~	14	20.0	2	3.0	101.7	76.7
11	West Germany	Norbert Wagner	Hans-Joachim Berndt; Friedrich May	12	18.0	6	11.7	20	26.0	~~22~~	~~28.0~~	4	8.0	7	13.0	104.7	76.7
12	Finland	Peter Tallberg	Johan Tallberg; Arndt Norrgård	4	8.0	10	16.0	10	16.0	16	22.0	9	15.0	~~22~~	~~28.0~~	105.0	77.0
13	Denmark	Paul Elvstrøm	Valdemar Bandolowski; Jan Kjærulff	7	13.0	17	23.0	1	0.0	6	11.7	~~DSQ~~	~~35.0~~	DNS	32.0	114.7	79.7
14	East Germany	Roland Schwarz	Werner Christoph; Lothar Koepsel	13	19.0	5	10.0	17	23.0	11	17.0	8	14.0	~~20~~	~~26.0~~	109.0	83.0
15	Bermuda	Kirkland Cooper	Alex Cooper; Jordy Walker	16	22.0	13	19.0	12	18.0	~~23~~	~~29.0~~	7	13.0	10	16.0	117.0	88.0
16	Australia	Robert Miller	Denis O'Neil; Ken Berkeley	~~15~~	~~21.0~~	15	21.0	13	19.0	12	18.0	11	17.0	13	19.0	115.0	94.0
17	Austria	Uli Strohschneider	Peter Denzel; Robert Haschka	~~26~~	~~32.0~~	16	22.0	15	21.0	13	19.0	13	19.0	8	14.0	127.0	95.0
18	Belgium	Dirk De Bock	Charles De Bondsridder; Walter Haverhals	17	23.0	21	27.0	14	20.0	~~21~~	~~27.0~~	15	21.0	5	10.0	128.0	101.0
19	Italy	Giuseppe Milone	Roberto Mottola di Amato; Antonio Oliviero	18	24.0	20	26.0	~~22~~	~~28.0~~	17	23.0	18	24.0	3	5.7	130.7	102.7
20	Switzerland	Ronni Pieper	Hans Gut; Peter Gerber	10	16.0	19	25.0	6	11.7	18	24.0	~~21~~	~~27.0~~	21	27.0	130.7	103.7
21	New Zealand	Steve Marten	Con Linton; Jack Scholes	14	20.0	18	24.0	19	25.0	~~20~~	~~26.0~~	20	26.0	12	18.0	139.0	113.0
22	Argentina	Ricardo Boneo	Héctor Campos; Pedro Ferrero	~~24~~	~~30.0~~	25	31.0	21	27.0	7	13.0	16	22.0	16	22.0	144.0	114.0
23	Mexico	Armando Bauche	Daniel Escalante; Esteban Gerard	22	28.0	8	14.0	~~26~~	~~32.0~~	26	32.0	22	28.0	23	29.0	163.0	131.0
24	Virgin Islands	Dick Holmberg	David Jones; David Kelly	21	27.0	~~24~~	~~30.0~~	23	29.0	24	30.0	19	25.0	19	25.0	166.0	136.0
25	Bahamas	Bobby Symonette	Craig Symonette; Percy Knowles	23	29.0	22	28.0	24	30.0	15	21.0	23	29.0	~~DNS~~	~~32.0~~	169.0	137.0
26	Philippines	Mario Almario	Alfonso Qua; Ambrosio Santos	25	31.0	~~26~~	~~32.0~~	25	31.0	25	31.0	24	30.0	24	30.0	185.0	153.0

Legend: DNS – Did not start; DSQ – Disqualified;
Discard is crossed out and does not count for the overall result.
Gender: – male; – female;

== Daily standings ==
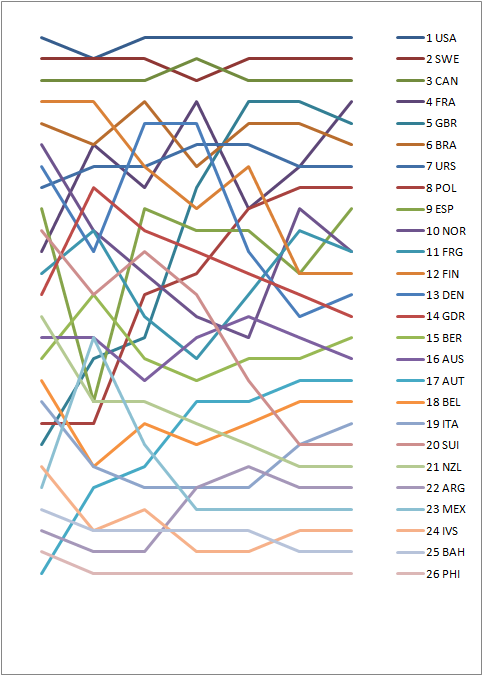
Graph showing the daily standings in the Soling during the 1972 Summer Olympics
