= Jean-Yves =

Jean-Yves is a French masculine given name. Notable persons with that name include:

- Jean-Yves André (born 1977), Mauritian footballer
- Jean-Yves Anis (born 1980), French footballer
- Yves Jean-Bart (born 1947), Haitian football executive
- Jean-Yves Berteloot (born 1958), French actor
- Jean-Yves Besselat (1943–2012), French politician
- Jean-Yves Béziau (born 1965), Swiss professor, mathematician, and researcher
- Jean-Yves Bigras (1919–1966), Canadian film director and film editor
- Jean-Yves de Blasiis (born 1973), French footballer
- Jean-Yves Blondeau (born 1970), French designer
- Jean-Yves Bony (born 1955), French politician
- Jean-Yves Bosseur (born 1947), French composer and writer
- Jean-Yves Calvez (1927–2010), French Jesuit priest and philosopher
- Jean-Yves Camus (born 1958), French political scientist
- Jean-Yves Cartier (born 1949), Canadian ice hockey defenceman
- Jean-Yves Chay (born 1948), French football manager and goalkeeper
- Jean-Yves Cheutin (born 1974), French slalom canoeist
- Jean-Yves Clément (born 1959), French writer
- Jean-Yves Couliou (1916–1995), French painter
- Jean-Yves Cousin (born 1949), French politician
- Jean-Yves Cuendet (born 1970), Swiss skier
- Jean-Yves Daniel-Lesur (1908–2002), French musician
- Jean-Yves Desgagnés, Canadian political activist
- Jean-Yves Duclos (born 1965), Canadian economist and politician
- Jean-Yves Duthel (born 1950), administrator and political spokesperson
- Jean-Yves Empereur (born 1952), French archeologist
- Jean-Yves Escoffier (1950–2003), French cinematographer
- Jean-Yves Esparon (born 1994), Seychellois sprinter
- Jean-Yves Ferri (born 1959), French writer and comics artist
- Jean-Yves Fourmeau, French classical saxophonist
- Jean-Yves Girard (born 1947), French logician
- Jean-Yves Haby (born 1955), French politician
- Jean-Yves Hasselin, French sailor
- Jean-Yves Jaffray (1939–2009), French mathematician and economist
- Jean Yves Jason (born 1965), Haitian politician
- Jean-Yves Keraudren, pseudonym of the Breton nationalist writer and far-right activist Théophile Jeusset
- Jean-Yves Kerjean (born 1958), French football manager and footballer
- Jean-Yves Lacoste (born 1953), French philosopher and theologian
- Jean-Yves Laforest (born 1949), Canadian politician
- Jean-Yves Le Bouillonnec (born 1950), French politician
- Jean-Yves Le Déaut (born 1945), French politician
- Jean-Yves Le Déroff (born 1957), French sailor
- Jean-Yves Le Drian (born 1947), French politician
- Jean-Yves Le Gall (born 1959), French engineer and businessman
- Jean-Yves Le Gallou (born 1948), French politician
- Jean-Yves Lechevallier (born 1946), French sculptor
- Jean-Yves Leconte (born 1966), French politician
- Jean-Yves Leroux (born 1976), Canadian ice hockey player
- Jean-Yves Li Waut (born 1978), Tahitian footballer
- Jean-Yves Mallat (born 1962), Lebanese sprinter
- Jean-Yves Malmasson (born 1963), French composer and conductor
- Jean-Yves Marin (born 1955), French archaeologist and museum director
- Jean-Yves Mollier (born 1947), French historian
- Jean-Yves Mvoto (born 1988), French footballer
- Jean-Yves Naouri (born 1959), French businessman
- Jean-Yves Nau (1952–2020), French physician and scientific journalist
- Jean-Yves Ollivier (born 1944), French businessman
- Jean-Yves Pellerin (born 1948), French sailor
- Jean-Yves Pollock (born 1946), French linguist and professor
- Jean-Yves Prigent (born 1954), French slalom canoeist
- Jean-Yves Raimbaud (1958–1998), French animator and screenwriter
- Jean-Yves Randriamarozaka, Malagasy footballer
- Jean-Yves Rey (born 1970), Swiss ski mountaineer and long distance runner
- Jean-Yves Riocreux (born 1946), French Roman Catholic bishop
- Jean-Yves Roy (born 1949), Canadian politician
- Jean-Yves Roy (ice hockey) (born 1969), Canadian ice hockey player
- Jean-Yves Tadié (born 1936), French writer, biographer and academic
- Jean-Yves Terlain (born 1944), French navigator and architect
- Jean-Yves Thériault (born 1962), Canadian musician
- Jean-Yves Thériault (kickboxer) (born 1955), Canadian kickboxer
- Jean-Yves Thibaudet (born 1961), French pianist
- Jean-Yves Touzaint (born 1948), French equestrian
- Jean-Yves Veillard (1939–2020), French historian
- Jean-Yves Verd'hurt (born c. 1940), French Egyptologist

== See also ==
- Jean (male given name)
- Yves (given name)
