= Balcells =

Balcells is a Spanish surname. Notable people with the surname include:

- Carlos Balcells, Filipino bass guitarist
- Carmen Balcells (1930–2015), Spanish literary agent
- Eugènia Balcells (1943–2026), Spanish artist
- Joan Balcells (born 1975), Spanish tennis player
- Luis Balcells (1902–1927), Spanish swimmer
- Manuel Balcells i Díaz (born 1958), Spanish politician
- Pedro Balcells (born 1954), Spanish swimmer
- Ramón Balcells (born 1951), Spanish sailor
- Ramón Balcells Rodón (1919–1999), Spanish sailor
