= Ramón Balcells =

Ramón Balcells may refer to:

- Ramón Balcells Comas (born 1951), Spanish Olympic sailor
- Ramón Balcells Rodón (1919–1999), Spanish Olympic sailor
