= Ives =

Name list

Ives is both a surname and a given name. Notable people with the name include:

== Surname ==
- Alice Emma Ives (1876–1930), American dramatist, journalist
- Burl Ives (1909–1995), American singer, author and actor
- Charles Ives (1874–1954), American composer
- Charles Ives (footballer) (1907–1942), football player from New Zealand
- Chauncey Ives (1810–1894), American sculptor in Italy
- Clarrie Ives (1890–1956), Australian rugby league footballer
- Clay Ives (born 1972), Canadian-born American luger
- David Ives (born 1950), contemporary American playwright
- Dick Ives (1926–1997), American basketball player
- Edward D. Ives (1925–2009), American folklorist
- Edward Ives (toymaker) (1839–1918), U.S. toymaker
- Edward Ives (rower) (born 1961), American Olympic oarsman
- Edward H. Ives (1819–1892), Wisconsin politician
- Eric Ives (1931–2012), English historian
- Eugene S. Ives (1859–1917), New York and Arizona politician
- F. Badger Ives (1858–1914), Wisconsin politician
- Florence Carpenter Ives (1854–1900), American journalist
- Frederic Eugene Ives (1856–1937), photography and halftoning pioneer
- George Cecil Ives (1867–1950), poet, writer, penal reformer and early gay rights campaigner
- George Frederick Ives (1881–1993), last surviving veteran of the Boer War
- Gideon S. Ives (1846–1927), American politician
- Grayston Ives (born 1948), British composer, singer and choral director
- Greg Ives (born 1979), American NASCAR crew chief
- Halsey Ives (1847–1911), American art museum director
- Henry S. Ives (c. 1862–1894), American financier
- Herbert E. Ives (1882–1953), physicist and inventor; son of Frederick Ives
- James Merritt Ives (1824–1895), American lithographer, partner in the firm Currier and Ives
- John Ives (1751–1776), English antiquarian and officer of arms
- Joseph Christmas Ives (1829–1868), American botanist, surveyor, engineer and Confederate officer
- Joshua Ives (1854–1931), first Professor of Music at the University of Adelaide, South Australia
- Mick Ives (1939–2024), English racing cyclist
- Norman Ives (1923–1978), American artist, professor, print publisher
- Ralph B. Ives (1873–1934), American businessman
- Thomas Ives (born 1996), American football player
- Tony Ives (1952–2026), English jockey
- William Ives (disambiguation), several people

== Given name ==
- Ivo of Ramsey (before 1000), Cornish saint
- Ivo of Chartres (1040–1115), French bishop and saint
- Ives of Kermartin (1253–1303), French parish priest and patron saint of Brittany, lawyers, and abandoned children
- Ives I de Belesme, 10th century Norman baron, controlling the lands and tower of Belesme
- Ives Goddard (1941–2025), American linguist and curator
- Ives Roqueta (1936–2015), Occitan author
- Ives Antero de Souza (born 1985), Brazilian footballer

== See also ==
- Senator Ives (disambiguation)
- Ivo, a variant
- Yves (given name), a variant
