= Iveta =

Iveta is a feminine given name, a variant of the name Yvette. It appears in Czech, Slovak, Latvian and Armenian languages. Masculine counterparts include Ivo and Ivan. Notable people with the name include:

- Iveta Apkalna (born 1976), Latvian organist
- Iveta Bartošová (1966–2014), Czech singer and actress
- Iveta Benešová (born 1983), Czech tennis player
- Iveta Dapkutė (born 1993), Lithuanian tennis player
- Iveta Dudová (born 1977), Czech footballer
- Iveta Grigule-Pēterse (born 1964), Latvian politician
- Iveta Grófová (born 1980), Slovak film director
- Iveta Karafiátová (born 1988), Slovak ice hockey player
- Iveta Koka (born 1982), Latvian ice hockey player
- Iveta Korešová (born 1989), Czech handballer
- Iveta Lutovská (born 1983), Czech model and beauty pageant titleholder
- Iveta Malachovská (born 1965), Slovak TV presenter and actress
- Iveta Matoušková (born 1987), Czech handballer
- Iveta Mazáčová (born 1986), Czech athlete
- Iveta Miculyčová (born 2005), Czech BMX cyclist
- Iveta Mukuchyan (born 1986), Armenian-German singer and model
- Iveta Pole (born 1981), Latvian actress
- Iveta Putalová (born 1988), Slovak athlete
- Iveta Radičová (born 1956), Slovak politician
- Iveta Šranková (born 1963), Slovak field hockey player
- Iveta Staša-Šaršūne (born 1976), Latvian curler
- Iveta Tonoyan (born 1981), Armenian politician and journalist
- Iveta Vacenovská (born 1986), Czech table tennis player
- Iveta Zelingerová (born 1972), Czech cross-country skier
