= Pierre Mainville =

Montreal City Councillor for Sainte-Marie ward
- In office 2009–2013
- Preceded by: position created
- Succeeded by: Valérie Plante

Ville-Marie Borough Councillor for Saint-Marie—Saint-Jacques ward
- In office 2005–2009
- Preceded by: position created
- Succeeded by: position abolished

Personal details
- Party: Vision Montreal (2005-2008); Projet Montréal (2008-2012); Independent (2012-2013); Équipe Denis Coderre pour Montréal (2017)

Pierre Mainville is a politician in Montreal, Quebec, Canada. He served on Montreal city council from 2005-2013, representing Sainte-Marie in the downtown Ville-Marie borough first as a member of Vision Montréal then as a member of Projet Montréal then as an independent. He was defeated in the November 2013 municipal election.

== Private career ==
Mainville has worked as a technician-coordinator at Radio-Canada for more than three decades. He has also been a representative of the Regroupement des commerçants de la rue Ontario, working on local issues involving crime, prostitution, and development.

== Borough councillor ==
Mainville was elected to the Ville-Marie borough council in the 2005 Montreal municipal election as a member of the Vision Montreal party. Montreal mayor Gérald Tremblay's Montreal Island Citizens' Union (MICU) won four of the five borough seats in this election, and Mainville was initially the only member of the opposition. He was the sole councillor to vote against a local $15 million surtax for new recreational and cultural services in 2006, arguing that the funds should have come from the entire city. The following year, he was the only councillor to vote against the introduction of harsh financial penalties for littering and graffiti. He argued that the law would be difficult to enforce and would result in arbitrary and unfair penalties. He also criticized a requirement that local merchants clean up vandalism outside their shops, arguing that this shifted responsibility away from the offenders.

In September 2007, Ville-Marie borough mayor Benoît Labonté and councillor Karim Boulos resigned from Tremblay's party to sit as independents. Mainville initially provided outside support to Labonté and Boulos, allowing them to maintain majority control on council. In October 2007, he was appointed to the borough's public safety committee.

Labonté and Boulos eventually joined Vision Montreal and formed an official governing caucus in conjunction with Mainville. This proved to be a short-lived alliance, however — Mainville resigned from Vision Montreal on 10 December 2008, saying that he did not have confidence in Labonté's leadership. For the next year, he served on the borough council as an independent.

== City councillor ==
Mainville was elected to the Montreal city council in the 2009 municipal election as a member of Projet Montréal. Some of this party's organizers had sought to draft Mainville as early as 2006, noting his speaking skills and his progressive views.

By virtue of being a city councillor, Mainville also continues to serve on the Ville-Marie borough council. In late 2009, he introduced a successful motion demanding that city council ask the provincial government to hold an inquiry into allegations of corruption in Montreal's construction sector. In June 2010, Mainville voted against a motion to establish a homeless youth shelter on a stretch of Ste. Catherine Street in Montreal's Gay Village district. He initially supported the plan, but changed his mind after hearing concerns that locating a shelter near bars and nightclubs would be counter-productive for combating drug addiction among the shelter's clientele.

Mainville has spoken in support of preserving Montreal's Redpath mansion.

He resigned from Projet Montréal to serve as an independent councillor on September 14, 2012.

== Electoral record ==
2009 Montreal municipal election: Councillor, Sainte-Marie division
Party	Candidate	Votes	%
Projet Montréal	Pierre Mainville	3,689	65.05
Union Montreal	Yves Pelletier	1,144	20.17
Parti Fierté Montréal	Michel Bédard co-listed with Milan Mirich	334	5.89
Independent	Frederic Rappaz	259	4.57
Parti Montréal Ville-Marie	Rim Zid	245	4.32
Total valid votes		5,671	100
Election results, 2009, City of Montreal.

2005 Montreal municipal election: Ville-Marie Borough Councillor, Sainte-Marie—Saint-Jacques
Party	Candidate	Votes	%
Vision Montreal	Pierre Mainville	3,355	40.55
Montreal Island Citizens Union	Jean-Yves Duthel	3,072	37.13
Projet Montréal	Brian Doody	1,847	22.32
Total valid votes		8,274	100
Source: City of Montreal official results (in French), City of Montreal.
