= 1973–1974 Whitbread Round the World Race =

1973–74 Whitbread Round the World Race
Event title
- Edition: 1st
- Yachts: Multi-class

Competitors
- Competitors: 15

Results
- Winner: Sayula II

The 1973–74 Whitbread Round the World Race, the first edition of the Whitbread Round the World Race, started off from Portsmouth, England on 8 September 1973. Seventeen yachts of various sizes and rigs took part. During the race three sailors were swept over board and died: Paul Waterhouse, Dominique Guillet and Bernie Hosking. Waterhouse and Guillet were never to be seen again.

The crew of the Mexican yacht Sayula II, a brand new Swan 65 owned and skippered by Mexican Captain Ramón Carlín, won the overall race in 133 days and 13 hours. Her actual time was 152 days. In 2016, this adventure was presented in a documentary film called The Weekend Sailor.

== Legs ==
Leg	Start	Finish	Leg winner	Skipper
1	Portsmouth, England	Cape Town, South Africa	Adventure	Patrick Bryans
2	Cape Town, South Africa	Sydney	Pen Duick VI	Éric Tabarly
3	Sydney	Rio de Janeiro, Brazil	Great Britain II	Chay Blyth
4	Rio de Janeiro, Brazil	Portsmouth, England	Sayula II	Ramón Carlín

== Results ==
Overall Pos	Line Honours Pos	Sail Number	Yacht	Country	Yacht Type	LOA (Metres)	Skipper	Elapsed Time d:hh:mm:ss	Corrected time d:hh:mm:ss
1	2	MX 7208	Sayula II	Mexico	Sparkman & Stephens Swan 65	19.68	Ramón Carlín	152:09:11:08	133:12:32:43
2	6	K 684	Adventure	(United Kingdom) Great Britain	Camper-Nicholson 55 Sloop	16.76	Patrick Bryans; Malcolm Skene; George Vallings; Roy Mullender	162:19:06:30	135:08:03:45
3	5	F 5959	Grand Louis	France	Presles 61 Schooner	18.59	André Viant	162:01:19:00	138:14:52:06
4	3	F 5784	Kriter	France	Auzepy-Brenneur 68 Ketch	20.73	Jack Grout; Alain Gliksman	156:14:10:03	141:01:53:35
5	7	I 4971	Guia	Italy	Sparkman & Stephens 45 Sloop	13.72	Giorgio Falck	177:19:23:48	142:19:20:40
6	1	K 3566	Great Britain II	(United Kingdom) Great Britain	Gurney 77 Sloop Maxi	23.52	Chay Blyth	144:10:43:44	144:10:43:44
7	4	K 3560	Second Life	(United Kingdom) Great Britain	Van de Stadt Ocean 71 Ketch Maxi	21.64	Roddy Ainslie	161:02:02:04	150:08:06:19
8	10	I 5905	CS e RB	Italy	Clark 50 Ketch	15.24	Doi Malingri di Bagnolo	187:00:21:46	155:06:57:06
9	8	K 3388	British Soldier	(United Kingdom) Great Britain	Clark 59 Yawl	17.98	John Day; G.C. Philp; Neil Carlier; James Myatt	179:19:49:53	156:20:53:19
10	9	I 5551	Tauranga	Italy	Sparkman & Stephens Swan 55	16.03	Erik Pascoli	185:20:42:52	156:22:23:43
11	14	PZ 30	Copernicus	Poland	Liskiewicz-Rejewski 45 Ketch	13.72	Zygfryd Perlicki	204:19:48:50	166:19:01:22
12	11	F 4390	33 Export	France	Mauric 57 Yawl	17.37	Jean-Pierre Millet; Dominque Guillet	197:10:02:24	174:22:28:22
13	12	PZ 3	Otago	Poland	Kujawa 55 Ketch	16.76	Zdzislaw Pienkawa	203:21:31:14	178:08:49:10
14	13	G 77	Peter von Danzig	West Germany	Gruber 59 Bermudan Yawl	17.98	Reinhard Laucht	204:15:30:55	179:14:50:40
DNF	15	F 5999	Pen Duick VI	France	Mauric 74 Ketch Maxi	22.17	Éric Tabarly	Retired-Leg 3	
DNF	16	K 808	Burton Cutter	(United Kingdom) Great Britain	Sharp-Williams 80 Ketch Maxi	24.38	Leslie Williams; Alan Smith	Retired-Leg 2	
DNF	NC	F 4279	Pen Duick III	France	Tabarly 57 Ketch	17.45	Marc Linski	Only Competed in Leg 4	
DNF	NC	56	Concorde	France	Auzepy-Brenneur Contessa 32	9.75	Pierre Chassin	Only Competed in Leg 2	
DNF	NC	SA 7	Jakaranda	South Africa	Sparkman & Stephen 56 Sloop	17.07	John Goodwin	Only Competed in Leg 1	
