= Iivo =

Male given name

- Gender: Male
- Language: Estonian, Finnish, Karelian
- Name day: 22 August (both Estonia and Finland)

Origin
- Origin: Iivari
- Region of origin: Karelia

Other names
- Related names: Ivalo, Ivar, Ivari, Iivari, Ivo, Iivi, Iive

Iivo is a predominantly Estonian, Finnish, and Karelian masculine given name.

In both Finnish and Estonian, it is a cognate of Ivo. In Finnish, it is also often a shortened form of Iivari.

As of 1 January 2023, 27 men in Estonian bear the first name Iivo, making it the 1,292nd most popular male name in the country. In Finland, between the years 2020 and 2022, 379 men were shown to bear the name in the Population Information System.

People named Iivo include:

- Iivo Ahava (1896–1919), Karelian-Finnish military officer and Karelian nationalist
- Iivo Härkönen (1882–1941), Karelian-Finnish writer, teacher and collector of Karelian folklore
- Iivo Hokkanen (born 1985), Finnish ice hockey player
- Iivo Nei (1931–2026), Estonian chess master
- Iivo Niskanen (born 1992), Finnish cross-country skier
- Iivo Väänänen (1887–1959), Finnish sport shooter
- Iivo Wegelius (formerly Iivo Järvitalo; born 1971), Finnish ice hockey player and coach
