= Iven (given name) =

Iven is a male given name. It is a diminutive variation of the names Ivo and Yvo and is also the Breton form of Evan. It is closely related to the names Ivon, Yvon, Ive, Ives, and Yves. As a surname, it appears as Ivens, meaning "Iven's son".

The name has two different meanings and etymologies:

- When derived from continental Celtic, it would be translated with "yew". A variation on this are the given name Yves, common in France, as well as the Welsh Evan. The translation of the Celtic version of Evan to "Young Warrior" and the alternate meaning of "Bow" or "Archer" suggest a connection to the English longbow most often made from yew.
- When derived from the Slavic languages, it is related to Ivan—itself a derivative of Johannes, the English John—and means "Yahweh is gracious". In this derivation, the Welsh Evan and the Scottish Ewan also have the same meaning.

Notable people with the name include:

- Iven Austbø, Norwegian footballer
- Iven Carl Kincheloe Jr., American pilot
  - Iven C. Kincheloe Award
- Iven Mackay, Australian Army officer
- Iven Manning, Australian politician
- Iven Moise, Seychellois runner
