= Sayula =

Sayula may refer to:

- Sayula, Jalisco, Mexico, birthplace of novelist Juan Rulfo
- Sayula de Alemán, Veracruz, Mexico, birthplace of President Miguel Alemán Valdés
- Sayula Popoluca, a language spoken in Sayula de Alemán
- Sayula II, a Swan 65 yacht designed by Sparkman & Stephens
