= Juan Llort =

Spanish sailor

Personal information
- Full name: Juan Llort Corbella
- Nationality: Spanish
- Born: 27 May 1950 Tarragona, Spain
- Height: 1.72 m (5.6 ft)

Sailing career
- Sport: Sailing
- Club: Royal Tarragona Yacht Club
- Class: Soling

Juan Llort Corbella (born 27 May 1950, in Tarragona) is a sailor from Spain. Llort represented his country at the 1972 Summer Olympics in Kiel. Llort took 9th place in the Soling with Ramón Balcells Rodón as helmsman and Ramón Balcells as fellow crew member.
