= Iwo =

Iwo or IWO may refer to:

== People ==
- Iwo Byczewski (born 1948), Polish diplomat
- Iwo Dölling (1923–2019), Swedish diplomat
- Iwo Gall (1890–1959), Polish theater director, stage designer, and pedagogue
- Iwo Kaczmarski (born 2004), Polish footballer
- Iwo Lominski (1905–1968), Polish-born microbiologist
- Iwo Odrowąż (died 1229), medieval Polish humanist, statesman, and bishop
- Iwo Cyprian Pogonowski (1921–2016), Polish-born polymath and inventor
- Iwo Zaniewski (born 1956), Polish painter, photographer, director, and artistic director

== Places ==
- Iwo Islands, another name for the Volcano Islands of Japan, of which Iwo Jima is one
  - Iwo Jima, a small island in Japan, site of the Battle of Iwo Jima during World War II
- Iwo Kingdom, a traditional state based on the city of Iwo in Osun State, Nigeria
  - Iwo, Osun, a city in the Nigerian state of Osun

== Other uses ==
- IWO, the International Workers Order, a pro-Communist fraternal organization and insurance company

== See also ==
- Ivo
