= Hans Gut =

Swiss sailor

Personal information
- Full name: Hans Gut
- Nationality: Swiss
- Born: 29 March 1950 (age 76)
- Height: 1.87 m (6.1 ft)

Sailing career
- Sport: Sailing
- Club: Zürcher Yachtclub
- Class: Soling

Hans Gut (born 29 March 1950) is a sailor from Switzerland. Gut represented his country at the 1972 Summer Olympics in Kiel. Gut took 20th place in the Soling with Ronni Pieper as helmsman and Peter Gerber as fellow crew member.
