= William Allen (sailor) =

American sailor (born 1947)

Personal information
- Full name: William Charles Allen
- Nickname: Bill
- Nationality: United States
- Born: November 20, 1947 (age 78) Minneapolis, Minnesota, U.S.
- Height: 1.88 m (6.2 ft)

Sailing career
- Sport: Sailing
- College team: Colorado College
- Club: Lake Geneva Yacht Club
- Class: Soling
Medal record
Representing United States
Olympic Games
Gold medal – first place	1972 Munich	Soling
- Updated on 9-JUN-2020

William Charles Allen (born November 20, 1947) is an American sailor and Olympic champion.

Allen received a gold medal in the Soling class at the 1972 Summer Olympics in Munich.
