= Johan Tallberg =

Finnish sailor

Personal information
- Full name: Johan Julius Tallberg
- Nickname: Jussi
- Nationality: Finnish
- Born: 13 May 1948 (age 78) Helsinki, Finland
- Height: 1.71 m (5.6 ft)

Sailing career
- Sport: Sailing
- Club: Nyländska Jaktklubben
- Class: Soling

Johan Julius Tallberg (born 13 May 1948, in Helsinki) is a sailor from Finland. Tallberg represented his country at the 1972 Summer Olympics in Kiel. Tallberg took 12th place in the Soling with Peter Tallberg as helmsman and Arndt Norrgård as fellow crew member.
