= Uli Strohschneider =

Austrian sailor (1940–1998)

Personal information
- Full name: Ulrich Strohschneider
- Nationality: Austrian
- Born: May 12, 1940 Salzburg, Austria
- Died: September 20, 1998 (aged 58) St. Gilgen, Austria
- Height: 1.90 m (6.2 ft)

Sailing career
- Sport: Sailing
- Class: Soling
Medal record
Representing Austria
European Championships
Silver medal – second place	1974 Medemblik	Soling

Ulrich "Uli" Strohschneider (12 May 1940 in Salzburg – 20 September 1998 in St. Gilgen) was a sailor from Austria. Strohschneider represented his country at the 1972 Summer Olympics in Kiel. Strohschneider took 17th place in the Soling with Peter Denzel and Robert Haschka as fellow crew members.

== International Soling Association ==
Strohschneider served many terms within the ISA. During that period, he succeeded to change the class rules to make the Soling unsinkable.

== Professional life ==
Strohschneider was a pharmacologist in the Austrian federal government.
