= Ivo =

- Pronunciation: English: /ˈaɪvoʊ/ EYE-voh; Croatian: [ǐːʋo] Italian: [ˈiːvo]
- Gender: Male

Origin
- Origin: Ivan (for Slavic)
- Region of origin: medieval France, Normandy; Balkans

Other names
- Related names: Yves, Ivica, Ivor, Ivaylo, Ives, Iivo, Đivo

Ivo is a masculine given name, in use in various European languages. The name used in western European languages originates as a Germanic name.

== Origins ==
The name is recorded from the High Middle Ages among the Normans of France and England (Yvo of Chartres, born c. 1040). The name's etymology may be either Germanic or Celtic, in either case deriving from a given name with a first element meaning "yew" (Gaulish Ivo-, Germanic Iwa-). The name may have been spread by the cult of Saint Ivo (d. 1303), patron saint of Brittany.

The Slavic name is a hypocorism, like its variant Ivica. In Croatia, the name exhibits both Slavic and Celtic-Germanic origins; the Slavic variant Ivona of the Celtic-origin feminine name Yvonne, is regular and fairly common.

== Variations ==
Ivo has the genitive form of "Ives" in the place name St Ives. In France, the usual variation of the name is Yves. In the Hispanic countries of Latin America, the name commonly spelled Evo, which is the masculine version of the feminine name Eva or Eve, should not be confused with Ivo.

Feminine equivalents of the name include Iva, and Yvette, amongst others.

== People ==
=== Medieval ===
- Saint Ivo of Chartres (1040s–1115), French bishop and confessor
- Saint Ivo of Kermartin (1253–1303), Breton advocate for the poor
- Saint Ivo of Ramsey, Cornish bishop
- Ivo Taillebois (died 1094), Huscarl of William the Conqueror
- Ivo de Grandmesnil (died 1102), English crusader
- Ivo de Vesci, 11th Century Norman noble, Lord of Alnwick
- Ivo (Dean of Wells), the inaugural Dean of Wells between 1140 and 1164

=== Modern ===
- Ivo Andrić (1892–1975), Serbo-Croatian writer and Nobel prize winner
- Ivo Andrić-Lužanski (born 1956), Croat politician of Bosnia and Herzegovina
- Ivo Basay (born 1966), Chilean footballer
- Ivo Belet (born 1959), Belgian politician
- Ivo Bligh, 8th Earl of Darnley (1859–1927), English cricketer
- Ivo Bobul (born 1953), Ukrainian singer of Romanian ethnicity
- Ivo Caprino (1920–2001), Norwegian filmmaker
- Ivo Daalder (born 1960), American diplomat
- Ivo Daneu (born 1937), Slovenian basketball player and coach
- Ivo Eensalu (born 1949), Estonian actor and theatre director
- Ivo Fabijan (1950–2006), Croatian musician, singer, composer and producer
- Ivo Garrani (1924–2015), Italian actor
- Ivo Goldstein (born 1958), Croatian historian
- Ivo Graham (born 1990), British comedian
- Ivo Gregurević (1952–2019), Croatian actor
- Ivo van Hove (born 1958), Belgian theatre director
- Ivo Iličević (born 1986), Croatian footballer
- Ivo Josipović (born 1957), Croatian politician and President of Croatia from 2010 to 2015
- Ivo Karlović (born 1979), Croatian tennis player
- Ivo Kuusk (1937–2023), Estonian opera singer
- Ivo Linna (born 1949), Estonian singer
- Ivo Livi (1921–1991), Italian-born French actor and singer
- Ivo Lola Ribar (1916–1943), Croatian politician and military leader
- Ivo Lorscheiter (1927–2007), Brazilian bishop
- Ivo Malec (1925–2019), Croatian composer and conductor
- Ivo Méndez (born 1991), Bolivian football referee
- Ivo Michiels (1923–2012), Belgian writer
- Ivo Minář (born 1984), Czech tennis player
- Ivo Nesrovnal (born 1964), Slovak lawyer and politician
- Ivo Niehe (born 1946), Dutch television presenter and producer
- Ivo Opstelten (born 1944), Dutch politician
- Ivo Papazov (born 1952), Bulgarian clarinetist
- Ivo Indzhev (born 1955), Bulgarian journalist and writer
- Ivo Pauwels (born 1950), Flemish author
- Ivo Perilli (1902–1994), Italian screenwriter
- Ivo Peters (1915–1989), British photographer
- Ivo Petrić (1931–2018), Slovenian composer
- Ivo Pinto (born 1990), Portuguese footballer
- Ivo Pitanguy (1926–2016), Brazilian plastic surgeon
- Ivo Pogorelić (born 1958), Croatian pianist
- Ivo Ringe (born 1951), German painter
- Ivo Robić (1923–2000), Croatian singer and songwriter
- Ivo Rodrigues (footballer) (born 1995), Portuguese footballer
- Ivo Rodrigues (runner) (born 1960), Brazilian marathon runner
- Ivo Ron (born 1967), Ecuadorian footballer
- Ivo Samkalden (1912–1995), Dutch politician
- Ivo Sanader (born 1953), Croatian politician
- Ivo Snijders (born 1980), Dutch rower
- Ivo Stourton (born 1982), English author
- Ivo Strejček (born 1962), Czech politician
- Ivo Tijardović (1895–1976), Croatian composer
- Ivo Trumbić (1935–2021), Croatian water polo player and coach
- Ivo Ulich (born 1974), Czech footballer
- Ivo Uukkivi (born 1965), Estonian actor
- Ivo Vajgl (born 1943), Slovenian politician
- Ivo Van Damme (1954–1976), Belgian athlete
- Ivo Värk (born 1974), Estonian naval officer
- Ivo Viktor (born 1942), Czech football goalkeeper
- Ivo Vojnović (1857–1929), Croatian and Serbian writer
- Ivo Watts-Russell (born 1954), English musician and producer, founder of 4AD record label
- Ivo Widlak (born 1978), Polish journalist
- Percival Ivo Vital e Noronha (1923–2019), Indian historian and heritage conservationist

== Characters ==
- Doctor Ivo Robotnik, also known by the alias Doctor Eggman, the main antagonist of the Sonic the Hedgehog video game series
- Professor Ivo, a villainous scientist in DC Comics and opponent of the Justice League of America
- Ivo Shandor, the eccentric designer of the building where the Ghostbusters confront Gozer and its minions
- Ivo Salvini, main character in Federico Fellini's last film The Voice of the Moon, played by Roberto Benigni
- Ivo Sharktooth, Private Jäger in Phil and Kaja Foglio's gaslamp fantasy webcomic, Girl Genius
- Ivo Andonov, an antagonist in the Pod Prikritie series
- Ivo Hugh, the foreman and chief mechanical engineer of the Skarloey Railway, in the book The Little Old Engine from the Rev. W. Awdry's The Railway Series of children's books

== See also ==
- Ive (given name)
- Iven (given name)
