= Józef Błaszczyk =

Polish sailor

Jozef Błaszczyk
Personal information
- Full name: Józef Wojciech Błaszczyk
- Nationality: Polish
- Born: 23 March 1947 (age 79) Gdynia
- Height: 1.70 m (5.6 ft)

Sailing career
- Sport: Sailing
- Club: Stali Gdynia
- Class: Soling

Józef Wojciech Błaszczyk (born 23 March 1947) is a sailor from Poland. Błaszczyk represented his country at the 1972 Summer Olympics in Kiel. Błaszczyk took 8th place in the Soling with Zygfryd Perlicki as helmsman and Stanisław Stefański as fellow crew member.
