= Dirk De Bock =

Belgian sailor

Personal information
- Full name: Dirk De Bock
- Nationality: Belgian
- Born: 9 October 1944 (age 82) Wilrijk, Belgium
- Height: 1.72 m (5.6 ft)

Sailing career
- Sport: Sailing
- Class: Soling
Competition record
Representing Belgium
Olympic Games
1972 Kiel	Soling
- Updated on 2 March 2014

Dirk De Bock (born 9 October 1944) is a sailor from Belgium. He was born in Wilrijk. De Bock represented his country at the 1972 Summer Olympics in Kiel. De Bock took 18th place in the Soling with Charles de Bondsridder and Walter Haverhals as fellow crew members.
