= Peter Denzel =

Austrian sailor (born 1939)

Personal information
- Nationality: Austrian
- Born: 24 March 1939 (age 87)
- Height: 1.87 m (6.1 ft)

Sailing career
- Sport: Sailing
- Class: Soling

Peter Denzel (born 24 March 1939) is a sailor from Austria. Denzel represented his country at the 1972 Summer Olympics in Kiel. Denzel took 17th place in the Soling with Uli Strohschneider as helmsman and Robert Haschka as fellow crew member.
