= Charles De Bondsridder =

Belgian sailor

Personal information
- Full name: Charles De Bondsridder
- Nationality: Belgian
- Born: 13 May 1943 (age 83)
- Height: 1.79 m (5.9 ft)

Sailing career
- Sport: Sailing
- Class: Soling
- Updated on 2 March 2014

Charles De Bondsridder (born 13 May 1943) is a sailor from Belgium. De Bondsridder represented his country at the 1972 Summer Olympics in Kiel. De Bondsridder took 18th place in the Soling with Dirk De Bock as helmsman and Walter Haverhals as fellow crew members.
