= Robert Haschka =

Austrian sailor (born 1950)

Personal information
- Nationality: Austrian
- Born: 6 February 1950 (age 76)
- Height: 1.63 m (5.3 ft)

Sailing career
- Sport: Sailing
- Class: Soling

Robert Haschka (born 6 February 1950) is a sailor from Austria. Denzel represented his country at the 1972 Summer Olympics in Kiel. Denzel took 17th place in the Soling with Uli Strohschneider as helmsman and Peter Denzel as fellow crew member.
