= Dick Holmberg =

American Olympic sailor (1931–2003)

Personal information
- Full name: Richard J. Holmberg
- Nickname: Dick
- Born: March 17, 1931 Chicago, Illinois, U.S.
- Died: December 30, 2003 (aged 72) Nellysford, Virginia, U.S.
- Height: 1.88 m (6.2 ft)

Sport

Sailing career
- Class: Soling

Richard J. Holmberg (March 17, 1931 in Chicago, Illinois – December 30, 2003 in Nellysford, Virginia) was a sailor from United States Virgin Islands. Holmberg represented his country at the 1972 Summer Olympics in Kiel. Holmberg took 24th place in the Soling with David Jones and David Kelly as fellow crew members.
