= Zygfryd Perlicki =

Polish sailor

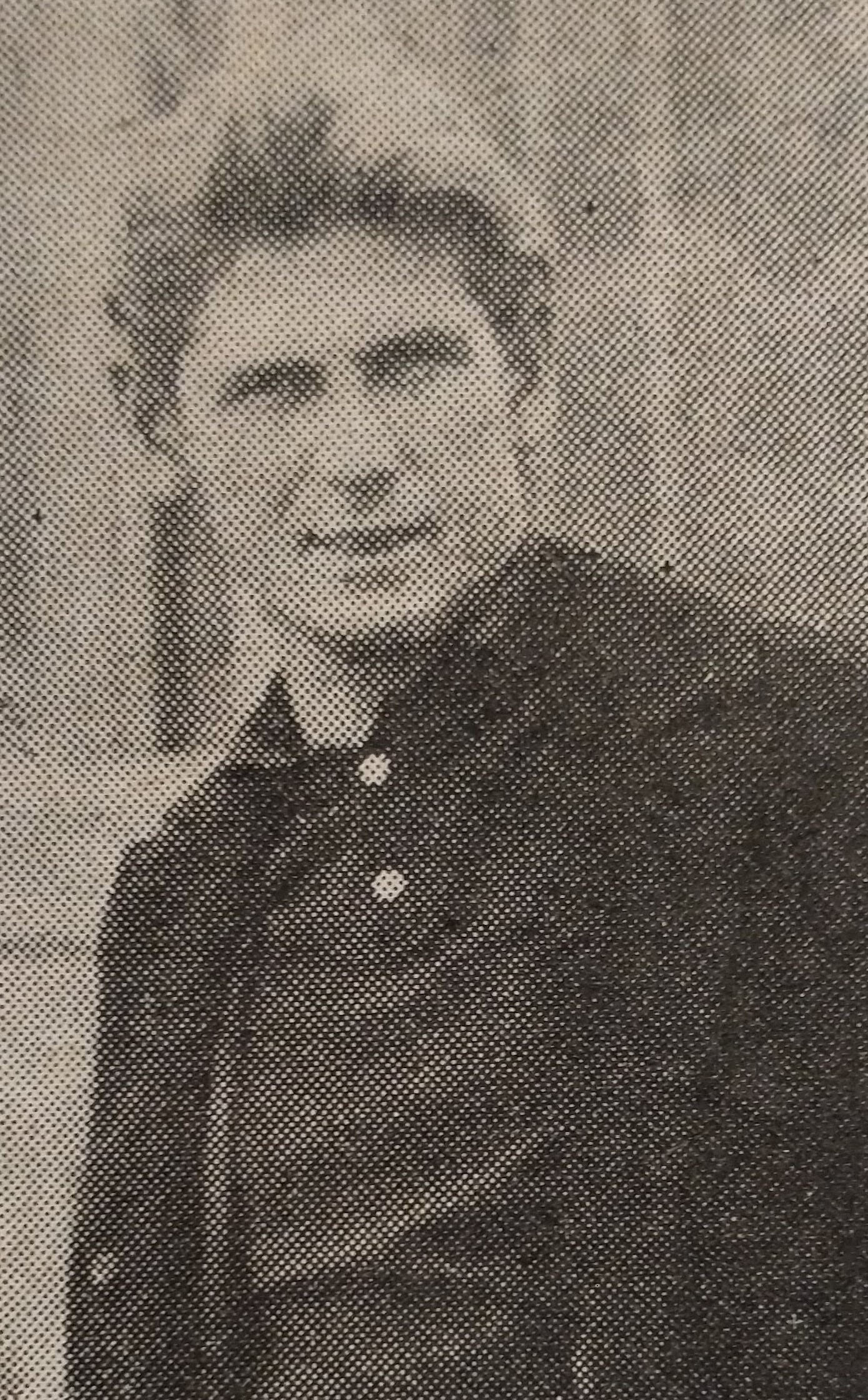
- Perlicki in 1973

Personal information
- Nationality: Polish
- Born: 26 January 1932 Gdynia, Poland
- Died: 10 August 2017 (aged 85)
- Height: 1.75 m (5.7 ft)

Sport

Sailing career
- Class: Soling
- Club: Stali Gdynia

Zygfryd Perlicki (26 January 1932, in Gdynia – 10 August 2017) was a sailor from Poland. He represented his country at the 1972 Summer Olympics in Kiel. He took 8th place in the Soling with Józef Błaszczyk and Stanisław Stefański as fellow crew members.

Perlicki sailed on Copernicus during the first Whitbread Round the World Race in 1973-74.
