= David Kelly (United States Virgin Islands sailor) =

American sailor

Personal information
- Nationality: American Virgin Islander
- Born: February 4, 1955 (age 70)
- Height: 1.88 m (6 ft 2 in)

Sailing career
- Class: Soling

David Kelly (born February 4, 1955) is a sailor from United States Virgin Islands. Kelly represented his country at the 1972 Summer Olympics in Kiel. Kelly took 24th place in the Soling with Dick Holmberg as helmsman and David Jones as fellow crew member.
