= Arndt Norrgård =

Finnish sailor

Personal information
- Full name: Arndt Johan Norrgård
- Nickname: Ati
- Nationality: Finnish
- Born: 21 May 1942 (age 84) Helsinki, Finland
- Height: 1.85 m (6.1 ft)

Sailing career
- Sport: Sailing
- Club: NJK, Helsinki
- Class: Soling
- Updated on 28 February 2014

Arndt Johan Norrgård (born 21 May 1942 in Helsinki) is a sailor from Finland. Norrgård represented his country at the 1972 Summer Olympics in Kiel. Norrgård took 12th place in the Soling with Peter Tallberg as helmsman and Johan Tallberg as fellow crew member.
