= Daniel Escalante =

Mexican sailor (born 1950)

Personal information
- Full name: Daniel Escalante
- Nationality: Mexican
- Born: September 9, 1950 (age 76)
- Height: 1.67 m (5.5 ft)

Sailing career
- Sport: Sailing
- Class: Soling
- Updated on 2 March 2014

Daniel Escalante (born 9 September 1950) is a sailor from Mexico. Escalante represented his country at the 1972 Summer Olympics in Kiel, Germany. He took 23rd place in the Soling event with Armando Bauche as helmsman and Esteban Gerard as fellow crew member.
