= Jack Scholes =

New Zealand sailor

Personal information
- Full name: John Edgar Scholes
- Nickname: Jack
- Nationality: New Zealand
- Born: 2 September 1917 Kyogle, New South Wales, Australia
- Died: 15 July 1989 (aged 71) Auckland, New Zealand
- Height: 1.87 m (6.1 ft)

Sailing career
- Sport: Sailing
- Class: Soling

John Edgar Scholes (2 September 1917 – 15 July 1989) was an Australian-born New Zealand sailor.

Scholes was born in Kyogle, New South Wales, Australia in 1917. He represented New Zealand at the 1972 Summer Olympics in Kiel. Scholes took 21st place in the Soling with Steve Marten as helmsman and Con Linton as fellow crew member. Scholes died at Auckland, New Zealand, on 15 July 1989.
