= Roberto Mottola di Amato =

Italian sailor

Personal information
- Nationality: Italian
- Born: 29 October 1954 (age 72) Naples, Italy
- Height: 1.92 m (6 ft 4 in)
- Weight: 87 kg (192 lb)

Sailing career
- Sport: Sailing
- Club: Circolo Remo Vela Italia
- Classes: Tempest; Soling

Roberto Mottola di Amato (born 29 October 1954) is a former sailor from Italy. Mottola di Amato represented his country at the 1972 Summer Olympics in Kiel. Mottola di Amato took 19th place in the Soling with Giuseppe Milone as helmsman and Antonio Oliviero as fellow crew member. Again with Giuseppe Milone as helmsman, Mottola di Amato took 5th place at the 1976 Summer Olympics in Kingston, Ontario in the Tempest.

== Personal life ==
He married Marina Tondato in June 2014. She was married previously to Ashley Hicks.
