= Mosel Vitelic =

Taiwan information technology company

Mosel Vitelic Inc.
- Traded as: TWSE: 2342
- Industry: Semiconductors
- Founded: May 23, 1983; 43 years ago
- Headquarters: Hsichih Taipei, Taiwan
- Area served: Worldwide
- Products: DRAM, power discrete Integrated Circuits, power management ICs
- Number of employees: 740
- Website: www.mosel.com.tw

Mosel Vitelic Inc. manufactures power discrete, power management IC and analog IC technologies. Mosel Vitelic Inc. (TWSE:2342) joined the Taiwan Stock Exchange in September 1995.

Its products include power MOSFETs, insulated-gate bipolar transistors, diodes, analog ICs, transient voltage suppressors (TVS), solar energy products, wide bandgap layout products, as well as other components and modules.

The company offers its products in China, Europe, the Americas, Japan, and South Korea.

Mosel Vitelic Inc. is based in Hsinchu, Taiwan.

== History ==
=== 1983–91: History and incorporation ===
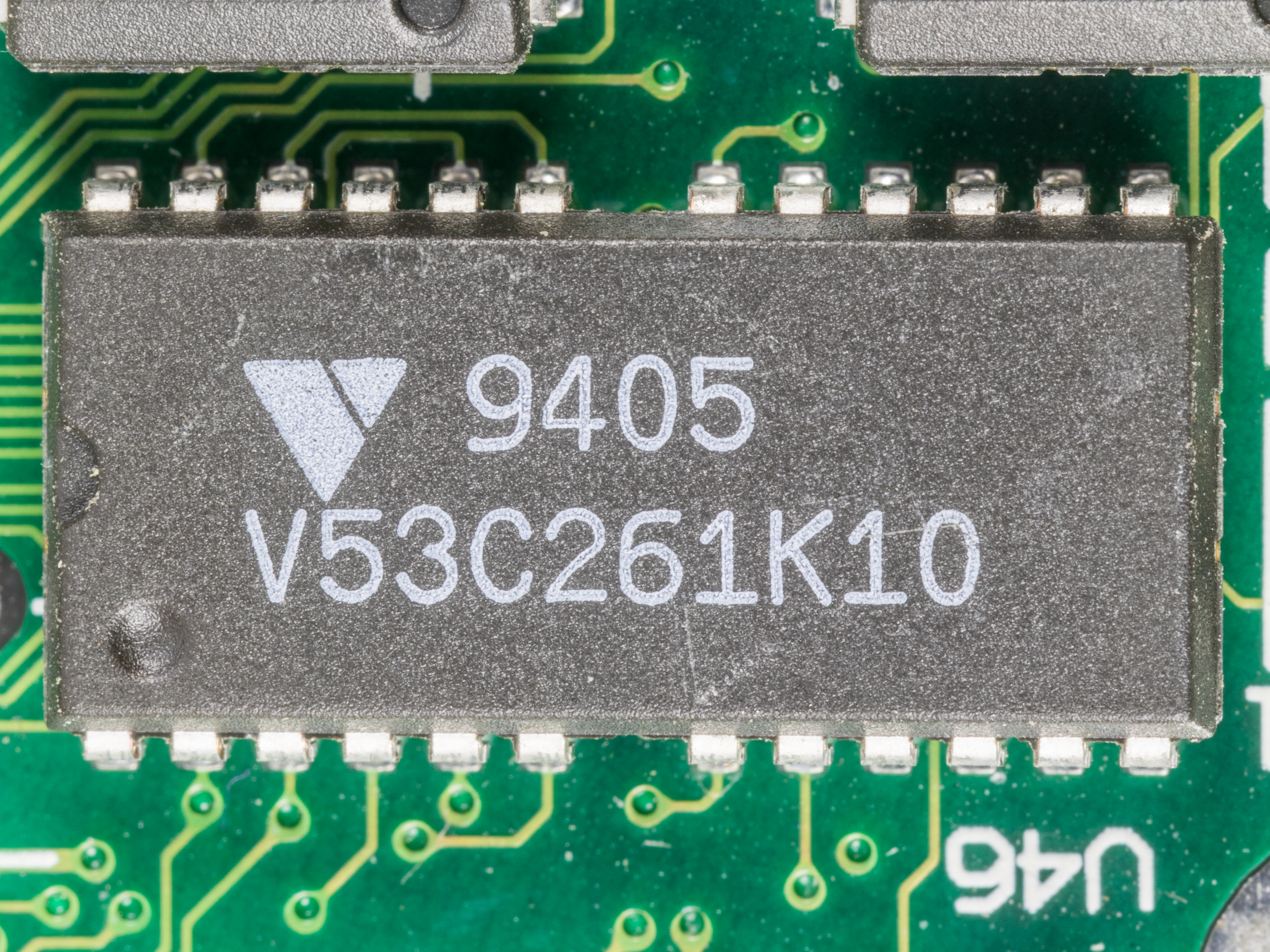
64K x 4 Multiport Video Memory V53C261K10 by Vitelic

- On the 23 May 1983, MOS Electronics Corp. was incorporated in California, USA, which, over the next two years (1984–1985) transferred 16K/64K technology to UMC.
- In 1986, the joint development of 64K/256K CMOS SRAM technology with Japan's FUJI and SHARP was carried out as well as the licensing of 64K/256K CMOS SRAM technology & products to Hyundai.
- In 1987 Mosel Taiwan Incorporated was founded by a merger of Mosel Electronics Taiwan Inc. and Vitelic Corporation.
- In 1988, Mosel Taiwan Inc. developed 1M CMOS SRAM technology.
- From 1989 - 1990, the R&D building was constructed; design of the first high-speed CMOS SRAM was carried out in Taiwan; joint development of 0.8~0.9 micron CMOS SRAM with TSMC; development of LATCH RAM, MUX RAM & ASM products; and a merger with Mosel-USA.

The founding and incorporation of Mosel Vitelic was in 1991.

==== Mosel Vitelic Corporation ====
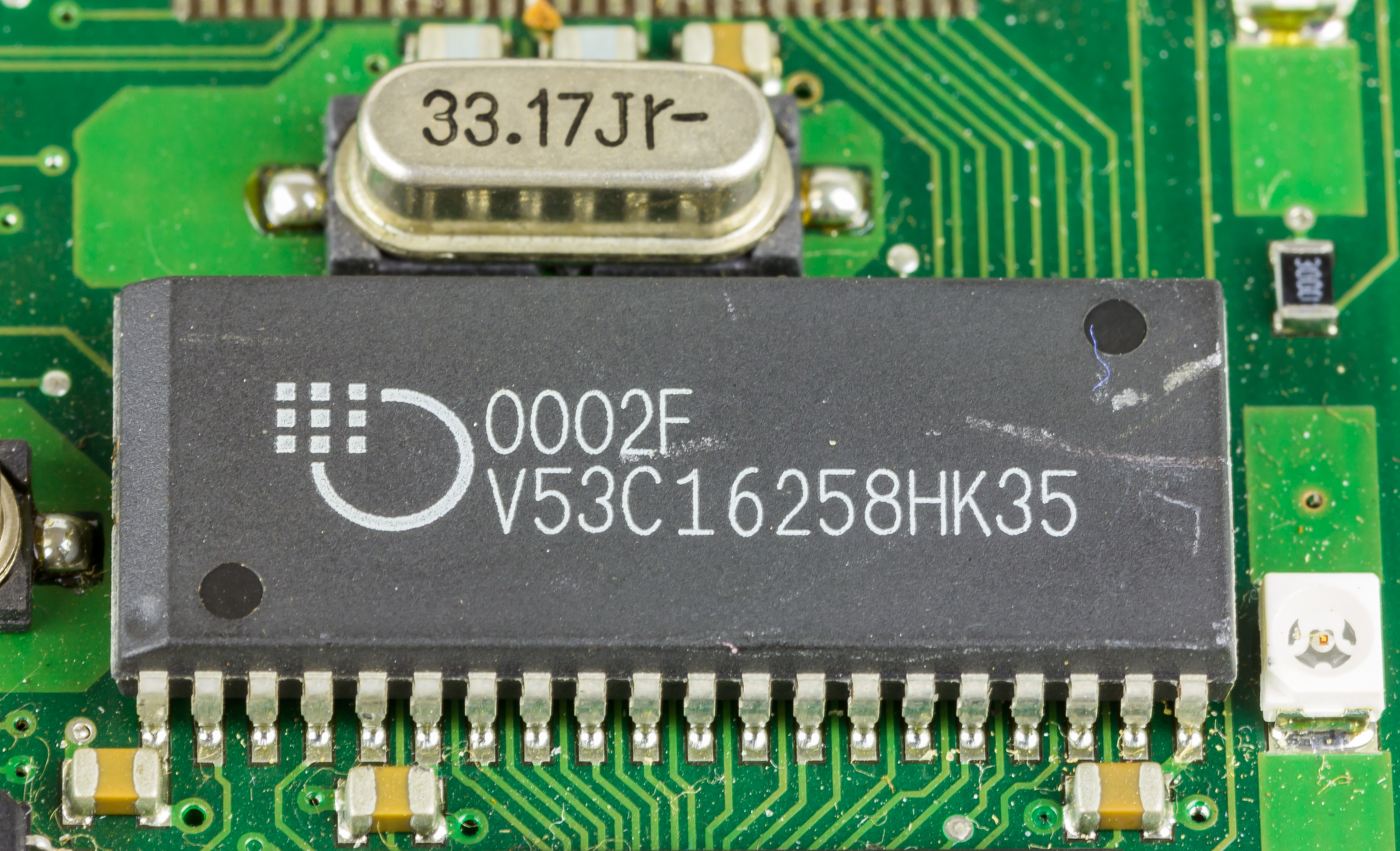
DRAM V53C16258HK35 by Mosel Vitelic

In 1985, Mosel Vitelic Inc. founded the Mosel Vitelic Corporation, its subsidiary for the production of integrated circuits for memory. It primarily made DRAM and Flash memory. They used a .12u/.14u process and manufacture 128Mb/256Mb SDR, DDR RAM and 256Mb/512Mb DDR2 RAM.

Around May 2009, the company closed its doors due to the lack of funding from the parent corporation.

=== 1991–95: Public listing and capacity building ===
- In 1992, Mosel Vitelic developed IVR 1M Hi-speed DRAM and Mask ROM.
- In 1993, Mosel Vitelic undertook the construction of a 6" wafer fabrication plant while the SEC granted MVI listing as a public disclosure company. In the same year it received a VRAM grant from the National Science Council N. S. C. (now known as the Ministry of Science and Technology).
- In 1994, the Submicron wafer fabrication plant and pilot were carried out.
- In 1995, Mosel Vitelic Inc. had a ground breaking ceremony for its 8" wafer fabrication plant.

=== 1996–present: New technologies ===
- In 1996, Mosel Vitelic Incorporated and Siemens agreed to form ProMOS Technologies, Inc.
- In 1997, Japanese Samurai bonds were issued.
- In 1998, a joint venture was announced between Mosel Vitelic Inc. and Siliconware to establish ChipMOS Technologies, Inc.
- In 1999, Mosel Vitelic Inc. acquired ownership of United Memories, Inc. and received RWTUV QS 9000 certification.
- In 2000, Mosel Vitelic Inc. and Sharp Corp. agreed to form DenMOS Technologies. Also, Infineon and Mosel Vitelic entered into a License Agreement. Mosel Vitelic Inc. also received RWTUV ISO-14001 Certification.
- In 2003, Mosel Vitelic Inc. received ISO/TS16949 Certification. It also withdrew from the DRAM market.
- In 2005, Mosel Vitelic Inc. expanded its capacity to 45,000 wafers per month.
- In 2006, Mosel Vitelic Inc. entered into an RFID technology transfer agreement with ITRI; logged a monthly output target of 60,000 wafers; announced new business activities in Solar Cell and RFID devices; and ceased the trading of Commodity DRAMs. Jean-Yves Duthel promoted plans for Mosel Vitelic Inc. to establish a plant in Quebec, however this was ultimately unsuccessful.
- In 2007, Mosel Vitelic Inc. completed its solar cell production line and entered into volume production with an average efficiency of 15.4% and above.
