= Yvo =

Yvo or YVO may refer to:

== People ==
- Yvo, a Dutch given name meaning Yves or Yvon
- Yvo of Kermartin (1253–1303), Christian saint
- Yvo of Chartres (1040–1115), Christian saint
- Yvo de Boer (born 1954), Dutch diplomat and environmentalist
- Yvo Kortmann, Dutch politician
- Yvo van Engelen (born 1985), Dutch footballer

== Other ==
- Val-d'Or Airport (IATA code: YVO), Quebec, Canada
- Yellowstone Volcano Observatory, an organization created to monitor and advise on the Yellowstone supervolcano
