= Con Linton =

New Zealand sailor

Personal information
- Full name: Cornelius Linton
- Born: 9 January 1938 Nelson, New Zealand
- Died: 30 December 2016 (aged 78) Auckland, New Zealand
- Height: 1.82 m (6.0 ft)

Sailing career
- Sport: Sailing
- Class: Soling

Cornelius "Con" Linton (9 January 1938 – 30 December 2016) was a New Zealand sailor. He represented his country in the Soling class at the 1972 Summer Olympics in Kiel, with Steve Marten as helmsman and Jack Scholes as fellow crew member, finishing in 21st place.

Born in Nelson in 1938, Linton was educated at Nelson College from 1951 to 1952. He died at his home in Auckland on 30 December 2016.
