= Armando Bauche =

Mexican sailor (born 1952)

Personal information
- Full name: Armando Bauche
- Nationality: Mexican
- Born: 5 August 1952 (age 74)
- Height: 1.70 m (5.6 ft)

Sailing career
- Sport: Sailing
- Class: Soling

Armando Bauche (born 5 August 1952) is a sailor from Mexico. Bauche represented his country at the 1972 Summer Olympics in Kiel, Germany. Bauche took 23rd place in the Soling with Daniel Escalante and Esteban Gerard as fellow crew members.
