= Steve Marten =

New Zealand sailor

Personal information
- Full name: Stephen Lawrence Marten
- Nationality: New Zealand
- Born: 8 October 1948 (age 78) Auckland, New Zealand
- Height: 1.73 m (5.7 ft)

Sailing career
- Sport: Sailing
- Class: Soling

Stephen Lawrence "Steve" Marten (born 8 October 1948, in Auckland) is a sailor from New Zealand. Marten represented his country at the 1972 Summer Olympics in Kiel. Marten took 21st place in the Soling with Con Linton and Jack Scholes as fellow crew members.
