= David Jones (sailor) =

United States Virgin Islands sailor

Personal information
- Full name: David Jones
- Nationality: American Virgin Islander
- Born: October 11, 1940 (age 85)
- Height: 1.83 m (6.0 ft)

Sport

Sailing career
- Class: Soling

David Jones (born October 11, 1940) is a sailor from United States Virgin Islands. Jones represented his country at the 1972 Summer Olympics in Kiel. Jones took 24th place in the Soling with Dick Holmberg as helmsman and David Kelly as fellow crew member.
