= Ivica =

- Pronunciation: Serbo-Croatian: [îʋit͡sa]
- Gender: Male and female

Origin
- Meaning: "YHWH has been Gracious"

Other names
- Related names: Ivan, Ivo, Ivana

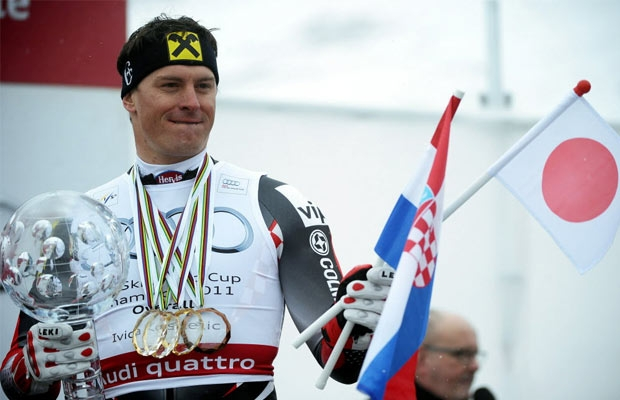
Ivica Kostelić with the trophy of the 2011 Alpine Skiing World Cup

Ivica is a Slavic masculine and feminine given name, a diminutive form of Ivan or Ivana. The direct English equivalent of the name is Johnny, while the equivalent of its augmentative Ivan is John.

It is one of the frequent male given names in Croatia, and is also present in Serbia and Bosnia and Herzegovina. It is present as feminine name in Slovenia and Slovakia.

In Croatia, the name Ivica became one of the most common masculine given name in the decades between 1950 and 1989, peaking at second most common 1970-1979.

Ivica is also a common character in Croatian jokes, like Perica.

In Slovenian, Ivica is both a masculine and feminine given name.

== Notable people named Ivica ==
- Ivica Avramović, Serbian footballer
- Ivica Dačić, Serbian politician, Prime Minister of Serbia
- Ivica Dragutinović, Serbian footballer
- Ivica Džidić, Croatian footballer
- Ivica Grlić, Bosnian Croat footballer
- Ivica Kostelić, Croatian alpine skier
- Ivica Kralj, Montenegrin footballer
- Ivica Matković (football coach) (born 1953), Croatian football coach
- Ivica Matković (Ustasha) (1913–1945), administrator at the Jasenovac World War II concentration camp in Croatia
- Ivica Mornar, Croatian footballer
- Ivica Olić, Croatian footballer
- Ivica Osim, Bosnian Croat footballer and coach
- Ivica Račan, Croatian politician
- Ivica Rajić, Croatian soldier
- Ivica Šerfezi, Croatian singer
- Ivica Zubac, Croatian basketball player
