= Yves Simon =

Yves Simon may refer to:

- Yves Simon (philosopher)
- Yves Simon (singer)
