= Esteban Gerard =

Mexican sailor (born 1953)

Personal information
- Full name: Esteban Gerard Contreras
- Born: February 28, 1953 (age 73) Mexico City, Mexico
- Height: 1.74 m (5.7 ft)

Sailing career
- Sport: Sailing
- Class: Soling

Esteban Gerard Contreras (born 28 February 1953, in Mexico City) is a sailor from Mexico. Gerard represented his country at the 1968 Summer Olympics in Acapulco. Gerard took 18th place in the Dragon with Javier Velázquez as helmsman and Roberto Sloane as fellow crew member. Gerard represented Mexico again at the 1972 Summer Olympics in Kiel, Germany. Gerard took 23rd place in the Soling with Armando Bauche as helmsman and Daniel Escalante as fellow crew member.
