= Ronni Pieper =

Swiss sailor

Personal information
- Full name: Ronald Pieper
- Nationality: Swiss
- Born: 21 March 1948
- Died: 26 August 2007 (aged 59)
- Height: 1.78 m (5.8 ft)

Sailing career
- Sport: Sailing
- Club: Segelclub St. Moritz
- Class: Soling

Ronald "Ronni" Pieper (21 March 1948 – 26 August 2007) was a sailor from Switzerland. Pieper represented his country at the 1972 Summer Olympics in Kiel. Pieper took 20th place in the Soling with Hans Gut and Peter Gerber as fellow crew members.
