= Walter Haverhals =

Belgian sailor (1948–2018)

Personal information
- Full name: Walter Haverhals
- Nationality: Belgian
- Born: 30 April 1948 Wilrijk
- Died: 14 November 2018 (aged 70)
- Height: 1.70 m (5.6 ft)

Sailing career
- Sport: Sailing
- Class: Soling

Walter Haverhals (30 April 1948 – 14 November 2018) was a sailor from Belgium. Haverhals represented his country at the 1972 Summer Olympics in Kiel. Haverhaels took 18th place in the Soling with Dirk de Bock as helmsman and Charles de Bondsridder as fellow crew member.
