= Iivari =

Iivari is a Finnish surname and male given name, related to the name Ivar and derived from the Old Norse Ívarr.

== Given name ==
- Iivari Kyykoski (1881–1959), Finnish gymnast
- Iivari Malmikoski (1927–2010), Finnish boxer
- nickname of Ivar Iivari Partanen (1880–1947), Finnish gymnast
- Iivari Rötkö (1893–1957), Finnish long-distance runner
- Iivari Yrjölä (1899–1985), Finnish decathlete

== Surname ==
- Antti Iivari (born 1992), Finnish ice hockey player
- Ulpu Iivari (born 1948), Finnish politician

== See also ==
- Otto-Iivari Meurman, Finnish architect
- Ivar
