= Antonio Oliviero =

Italian sailor

Personal information
- Full name: Antonio Oliviero
- Nationality: Italian
- Born: 18 July 1943 (age 83) Sorrento, Naples, Italy
- Height: 1.83 m (6.0 ft)

Sailing career
- Sport: Sailing
- Class: Soling

Antonio Oliviero (born 18 July 1943 in Sorrento, Naples) is a sailor from Italy. Oliviero represented his country at the 1972 Summer Olympics in Kiel. Oliviero di Amato took 19th place in the Soling with Giuseppe Milone as helmsman and Roberto Mottola di Amato as fellow crew member.
