= Ivins =

Ivins may refer to:

== People ==
Sorted by date of birth:

- Anthony W. Ivins (1852–1934), official of The Church of Jesus Christ of Latter-day Saints
- William Ivins Jr. (1881–1961), curator at the Metropolitan Museum of Art
- Antoine R. Ivins (1888–1967), official of The Church of Jesus Christ of Latter-day Saints
- Molly Ivins (1944–2007), American newspaper columnist
- Bruce Edwards Ivins (1946–2008), American biomedical researcher
- Marsha Ivins (1951), American astronaut
- Michael Ivins (1963), member of the band The Flaming Lips.

== Places ==
- Ivins, Utah

== See also ==
- Ivens (disambiguation)
