= Giuseppe Milone =

Italian sailor

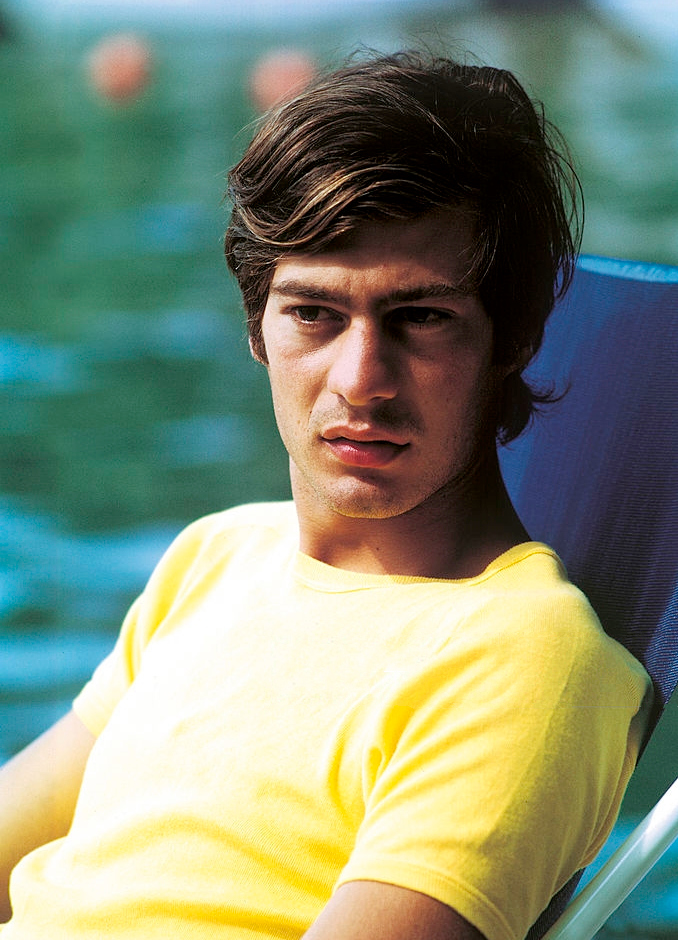
- Milone at the 1972 Olympics

Personal information
- Full name: Giuseppe Milone
- Nationality: Italian
- Born: 27 December 1949 (age 76) Milan, Italy
- Height: 1.870 m (6 ft 1.6 in)
- Weight: 75 kg (165 lb)

Sailing career
- Sport: Sailing
- Classes: Tempest; Soling

Giuseppe Milone (born 27 December 1949) is a retired sailor from Italy. Milone represented his country at the 1972 Summer Olympics in Kiel and placed 19th in the Soling, together with Roberto Mottola di Amato and Antonio Oliviero as fellow crew members. Again with Roberto Mottola di Amato, Milone took 5th place at the 1976 Summer Olympics in Kingston, Ontario as helmsman in the Tempest.
