= Jean-Yves Duthel =

Jean-Yves Duthel (born 31 May 1950) is an administrator and political spokesperson in the Canadian province of Quebec.

== Early career ==
Jean-Yves Duthel was born in Alsace (France). He was the last of four children for his mother, Magdalena Duthel (died 13 January 2012 at the age of 103). He came from a long standing military family within the German Empire up to 1918. On his father, Jean Albert Duthel's side (died 25 May 1999 at the age of 89) his fore-parents were farmers. In 1968 he became a Boursier ACADEMIE FRANCAISE-ZELLIDJA and travelled through Africa for 6 months. The following year the same foundation sponsored his journey to the USA. During his studies at the University of Strasbourg he was also active on different pirate radios, at this time the radio system in France was not open. He was very active in the 1968 student strike.

Duthel obtained a degree in political science and journalism and began his career as a journalist in Alsace. He left to settle in Quebec in 1972. He was a journalist at Radio-Canada and Canadian Press. He joined the Parti Québécois officers in 1976. He successively acted as a councillor to the President of the PQ, Prime Minister René Levesque, Press Secretary to State minister for economic development, Bernard Landry, Deputy Chief of the staff of the same as Minister for Foreign Relations. A supporter of Quebec sovereignty, he became active in the Parti Québécois and held press attaché positions for various members of René Lévesque's government. When the PQ chose to de-emphasize its focus on Quebec sovereignty in the mid-1980s, he joined and served on the advisory board of the more hardline Rassemblement démocratique pour l'indépendance.

== Union des producteurs agricoles ==
After the Quebec Liberal Party was returned to power in the 1985 provincial election, Duthel became the public relations director for the Union des producteurs agricoles (UPA). In 1988, he organized an international conference against acid rain and fought to prevent Quebec's Steinberg supermarket chain from being sold to an Ontario consortium. In the same period, he supported a shift away from food aid policies, which he described as colonialist, in favour of promoting domestic agriculture in under-developed countries.

Like other UPA leaders, Duthel opposed the Canada-United States Free Trade Agreement; he also criticized Canadian Prime Minister Brian Mulroney for suggesting that the UPA was biased in favour of the opposition New Democratic Party. In the 1988 Canadian federal election, he organized a party leaders debate on agriculture and free trade that Mulroney declined to attend. Duthel later accused the federal government of undermining Quebec's farm marketing boards and called on the Quebec government to take on more oversight powers.

In 1989, Duthel criticized the Quebec government's approach to land speculation and farmland rezoning. He was in charge for UPA of the international conference on Rural World, hold in Montréal in January 1989. The conclusions of this conference are still today the main bases of the UPA.

== MUCTC and Biochem ==
Duthel became a spokesperson for the Montreal Urban Community Transit Corp. (MUCTC) in 1991. He promoted public transit over car use and, during labour difficulties in the winter of 1991-92, accused the corporation's maintenance workers union of inappropriate pressure tactics.

In October 1992, he was hired as Vice-President, Public Affairs and Communications of Biochem Pharma Inc. In this capacity, he announced the company's Montreal research tests with the anti-AIDS compound 3TC. He subsequently accused rival company Connaught of seeking to undercut its competition by dumping an American flu vaccine in Canada at a discounted price. Connaught denied the allegation.

During this period, Duthel also worked as director of communications for the Montreal Citizens' Movement, a municipal political party.

== Société générale de financement ==
The Parti Québécois was returned to office in the 1994 general election. Shortly thereafter, Duthel became director of communications at the Ministry of International Relations under minister Bernard Landry, a longtime friend. In May 1995, he announced that Quebec diplomats would soon receive the same perks and privileges as representatives of sovereign countries. He became a spokesperson for the Fonds de Solidarité des Travailleurs du Québec in 1996.

In 1998, Duthel became Vice President, Communications, Public and International Relations for Quebec's Société générale de financement (SGF). He indicated in December 1999 that the SGF was attempting to persuade Nasdaq to extend its electronic trading to Montreal; Nasdaq agreed to the plan the following year. Duthel also promoted plans to construct a Technodome theme park in Montreal and to have Taiwanese chip maker Mosel Vitelic Inc. establish a plant in Quebec; neither plan was ultimately successful. In 2002, he wrote that the SGF had invested $7.5 billion and created 43,000 jobs in the past four years. Duthel became, on a contractual basis Deputy Secretarial General of the Government of Québec under Bernard Landry Prime minister. He was in charge of all governmental communications. He went back to SGF in January 2003 after having fulfilled his mandate at the Quebec government.

Duthel left the SGF in 2003 after the Quebec Liberal Party was again returned to office. Some criticisms later surfaced about the expenses of Duthel and his superior officer, SGF leader Claude Blanchet. Duthel attacked Michel Morin, a journalist at the French sector of Radio-Canada at the Conseil de Presse du Québec about a topo on TV about the story of large expenses. In November 2003, the Conseil de Presse AND the Radio-Canada Ombudsam blamed severely the topo and the decision chain of the News direction at Radio-Canada. They officially excused themselves on the air on December 4 th 2003.

== Since 2003 ==
Duthel ran for election to the Ville-Marie borough council in the 2005 Montreal municipal election as a candidate of Montreal mayor Gérald Tremblay's Montreal Island Citizens Union (MICU). He lost to Pierre Mainville of the opposition Vision Montreal party. MICU won four of the borough council's five seats, and borough mayor Benoît Labonté subsequently hired Duthel as Ville-Marie's director of public affairs. Duthel was an organizer for the 2006 Montreal Outgames and specifically in charge of the First LGBT Human rights international conference which gathered in Montréal, in June 2006, around 2000 participants under the endorsement of Louise Arbour at that time Commissioner for Human Rights at the UN. . Duthel created his own PR firm - PHILEAR - with contracts in the private sector. In February 2010 he accepted a full-time mandate of Daniel Gibbs- at that time First vice-president of the Overseas Territorial Community of Saint-Martin (French Caribbean island= French overseas department) of special councillor. He became director of the new political movement Union pour la Democratie, founded by Gibbs, in March 2011. This UD became the official opposition in the Territorial Island Council at the 25th of March 2012 elections. And Daniel Gibbs was, in June 2012, elected MP of St. Barth and St. Martin to the French National Assembly (UMP).

Duthel went back to Montreal in May 2012. He is an acting consultant in the PR and political field.

== Electoral record ==
2005 Montreal municipal election: Ville-Marie Borough Councillor, Sainte-Marie—Saint-Jacques
| Party | Candidate | Votes | % |
|---|---|---|---|
| Vision Montreal | Pierre Mainville | 3,355 | 40.55 |
| Montreal Island Citizens Union | Jean-Yves Duthel | 3,072 | 37.13 |
| Projet Montréal | Brian Doody | 1,847 | 22.32 |
| Total valid votes | | 8,274 | 100 |
Source: City of Montreal official results (in French), City of Montreal.

== Bibliography ==
- Deux Hommes et Trois Couffins: Une Tranche de Vie Réelle (2013)
- Québec Solidaire: À Vendre - Vendu(2018)
- Bernard Landry: L'Héritage d'un Patriote (2019)
- La Fragilité De la Démocratie: David Payne ou l'Homme aux Trois Vies (2022)
