= Stanisław Stefański =

Polish sailor

Personal information
- Full name: Stanisław Stefański
- Nationality: Polish
- Born: 24 August 1947 (age 78) Gdańsk
- Height: 1.75 m (5.7 ft)

Sailing career
- Sport: Sailing
- Club: Stali Gdynia
- Class: Soling

Stanisław Stefański (born 24 August 1947, in Gdańsk) is a sailor from Poland. Perlicki represented his country at the 1972 Summer Olympics in Kiel. Perlicki took 8th place in the Soling with Zygfryd Perlicki as helmsman and Józef Błaszczyk as fellow crew member.
