= Peter Gerber (sailor) =

Swiss sailor

Personal information
- Full name: Peter Gerber
- Nationality: Switzerland
- Born: 22 May 1944 (age 82)
- Height: 1.77 m (5.8 ft)

Sailing career
- Sport: Sailing
- Club: Zürcher Yachtclub
- Class: Soling

Peter Gerber (born 22 May 1944) is a sailor from Austria. Gerber represented his country at the 1972 Summer Olympics in Kiel. He took 20th place in the Soling with Ronni Pieper as helmsman and Hans Gut as fellow crew member.
