= Ramón Carlín =

Mexican sailor

Personal information
- Nationality: Mexico
- Born: Ramón Carlín Lima; 31 August 1923 Puebla, Mexico
- Died: 6 May 2016 (aged 92) Mexico City, Mexico
- Spouses: Paquita Carlín (divorced) Francisca Larios

Sport
- Sport: Sailing

Ramón Carlín Lima (31 August 1923 – 6 May 2016) was a Mexican sailor.

== Early life and career ==
Carlín was born in Puebla, the son of Moises Carlín and Magdalena Lima, a teacher. In his teenage years, he moved to Mexico City. After moving, he worked in a soap factory, and was a salesman. In 1960, he founded Comercial Doméstica, a washing machine company.

In his forties, Carlín began sailing after he bought his first sailboat Sayula I, competing in small races in Acapulco. In September 1973, he won the Whitbread Round the World Race at the The Ocean Race in Portsmouth, winning with his Swan 65 sailing yacht Sayula II. His win was featured in the 2016 documentary film The Weekend Sailor.

== Personal life and death ==
Carlín was married twice. He was first married to Paquita, but their marriage ended in divorce. He was then married to Francisca Larios. His second marriage lasted until his death in 2016.

Carlín died in Mexico City on 6 May 2016, at the age of 92.
