= Copernicus (yacht) =

Polish yacht

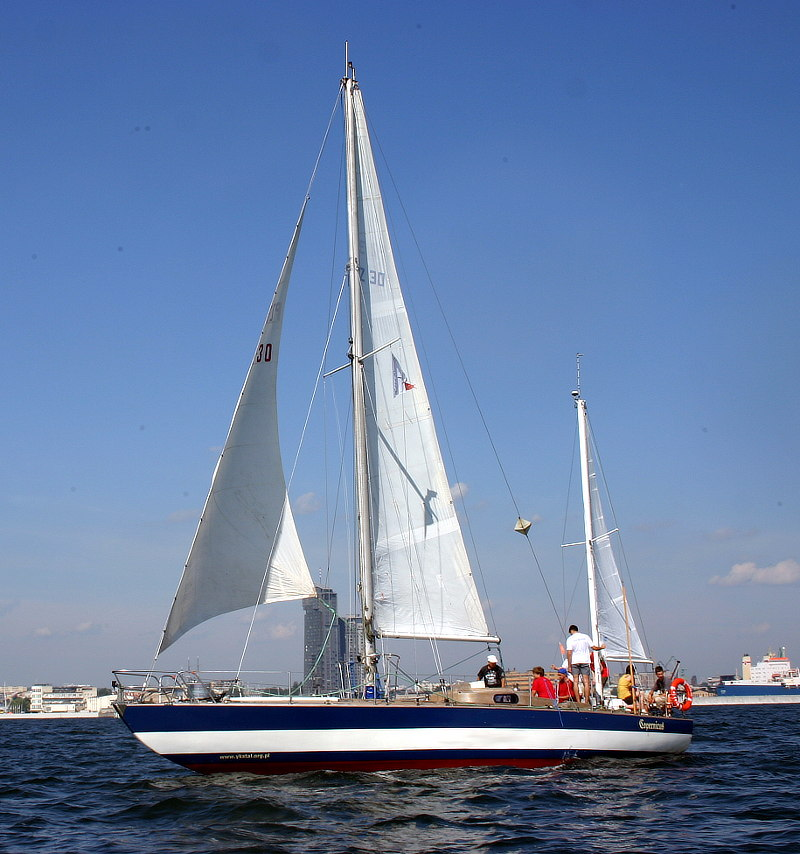
- Copernicus
- Nation: Poland
- Class: Opal III
- Sail no: PZ–30
- Designer(s): Edmund Rejewski, Wacław Liskiewicz & Zygfryd Perlicki
- Builder: Gdansk Boatyard Stogi; Gdańsk, Poland
- Owner(s): Yacht Club Stal

Racing career
- Skippers: Zygfryd Perlicki

Specifications
- Displacement: 14,500 kg (32,000 lb)
- Length: 14.11 m (46.3 ft)
- Beam: 3.72 m (12.2 ft)
- Sail area: 80 m^{2} (860 sq ft)

Copernicus is a Polish yacht of Opal Class. The owner is Yacht Club Stal Gdynia, Poland.

== History and cruises ==
The yacht Copernicus was built especially for the Whitbread Round The World Race 1973. She was slightly bigger than standard Opal II class - to get the 33 feet rating by IOR. The wooden hull was built in Gdańsk Boatyard Stogi, with help from the members of Yacht Club Stal Gdynia. The design was by Edmund Rejewski and Wacław Liskiewicz, also Zygfryd Perlicki.

The yacht took 11th place in Whitbread Round The World Race 1973. The skipper was Zygfryd Perlicki, and the crew was Zbigniew Puchalski, Bogdan Bogdzinski, Ryszard Mackiewicz and Bronislaw Tarnacki.

The yacht was used for youth training, cruising, partly chartering after the race. She sails mostly on Baltic Sea and North Sea.

She won the "Cruise of the year" prize in 2006 (in Poland) for the round-the-Iceland cruise.

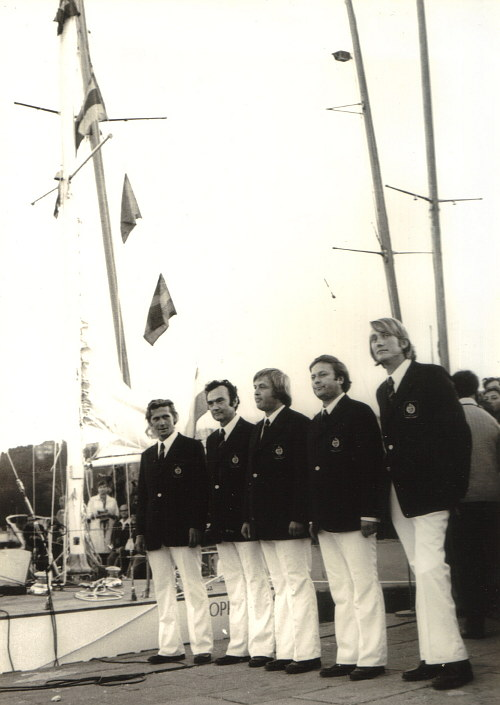
The Copernicus's crew before the Whitbread Race 1973

== Technical specifications ==
- Reg. number: PZ 30
- Call Sign: SPG2191
- Shipyard: Gdansk Boatyard Stogi (later Conrad Yacht Shipyard)
- Build of: oak framing with pine elements, mahogany planking, deck: plywood with teak.
- Class: Opal III
- Sail area: 80m^{2}
- Length: 14.11 m
- Breadth: 3.72 m
- Draft: 2.16 m
- Engine: Sole Diesel 45 (45 HP)
- Crew: 9 person
