= Iwo Lominski =

Polish-born British microbiologist (1905–1968)

Iwo Robert Waclaw Lominski FRSE (1905–1968) was a Polish-born microbiologist working in Britain in the 20th century. In articles he is referred to as I. R. W. Lominski.

== Life ==
He was born in Kraków in Poland in 1905. He studied medicine at the University of Kraków and gained his doctorate (MD) in 1931. He obtained a prestigious position in the Pasteur Institute in Paris.

At the outbreak of the Second World War he joined Polish forces fighting in France but was invalided out in 1940. In 1941 he went to Britain and obtained a Carnegie Teaching Fellowship at Glasgow University. In 1948 he also took on a role of senior consultant at Glasgow Western Infirmary. In 1963 he was awarded an honorary doctorate (DSc) by the university and in 1966 he was created professor of microbiology.

In 1958 he was elected a fellow of the Royal Society of Edinburgh. His proposers were Carl Hamilton Browning, John Walton, Norman Davidson, and John Monteath Robertson.

He died on 19 October 1968 aged only 63. In 1997, the "Iwo Lominski Bursary" was created by Glasgow University in his memory.
