= Bo Knape =

Swedish sailor

Medal record

Sailing

Representing Sweden

Olympic Games
Silver medal – second place	1972 Munich	Soling

Bo Knape (born 16 August 1949) is a Swedish sailor. He won a silver medal in the Soling class at the 1972 Summer Olympics.
