= Yvette =

- Gender: Female
- Language: French

Origin
- Meaning: yew
- Region of origin: Francophone countries

Other names
- Related names: Yves, Ives, Ivette, Ivete, Iva, Ivo, Ivy

Yvette (/iːˈvɛt/, /ɪ-/) is a feminine given name, the French feminine form of Yves, which means 'yew' or 'archer' in some cases.

== Variations ==
- Catalan: Ivet
- Czech: Iveta (rarely Yveta)
- Dutch: Yvette, Yvet
- English: Yvette, Yvet, Yvett
- French: Yvet, Yvette
- German: Yvet, Yvett, Ivet
- Greek: Yvet
- Hungarian: Ivett
- Italian: Ivette
- Polish: Iweta
- Portuguese: Ivete
- Russian: Иветта (Ivetta)
- Spanish: Ivette, Iveth
- Swedish: Yvet, Ivet
- Ukrainian: Іветта (Ivetta)

== Name days ==
- Czech Republic: 7 June
- Hungary: 13 January, 6 May and 29 June
- Poland: 13 January
- Slovakia: 27 May
- Bulgaria: 24 June ("Eniovden")
- Latvia: 12 December

== Notable people ==
- Yvette Alexander (born 1961), U.S. politician
- Yvette Amice, (1936–1993), French mathematician
- Yvette Andréyor (1891–1962), French silent film actress
- Yvette Angel (born 1963), American basketball player and coach
- Yvette Baker (born 1968), British orienteer
- Yvette Barbaza (1914–2009), French geographer
- Yvette Biro, Hungarian essayist, screenwriter, and professor emerita
- Yvetta Blanarovičová, Slovak actress and singer
- Yvette Borup Andrews (1891–1959), American photographer
- Yvette Brind'Amour (1918–1992), Canadian actor
- Yvette Cason, U.S. film and television actress
- Yvette Chauviré (1917–2016), French prima ballerina
- Yvette Clarke (born 1964), U.S. politician
- Yvette Cooper (born 1969), British politician
- Yvette Coppersmith (born 1980), Australian artist
- Yvette D'Ath (born 1970), Australian politician
- Yvette Devereaux, U.S. conductor
- Yvette Espinosa (1911–1992), English ballerina and ballet teacher
- Yvette Estermann (born 1967), Swiss politician
- Yvette Fielding (born 1968), British broadcaster and actress
- Yvette Flores, U.S. child actress for the Kidsongs videos and TV show
- Yvette Flunder (born 1955), U.S. bishop and singer
- Yvette Fontaine (born 1946), Belgian racing driver
- Yvette Freeman (born 1957), U.S. actress
- Yvette Giraud (1916–2014), French singer
- Yvette Girouard, U.S. softball coach
- Yvette Guilbert (1867–1944), French cabaret singer and actress
- Yvette Higgins (born 1978), Australian water polo player
- Yvetta Hlaváčová (born 1975), Czech swimmer
- Yvette Jaggi (born 1941), Swiss politician
- Yvette Jarvis, U.S./Greek athlete, politician, actress and model
- Yvette Kane (born 1953), U.S. judge
- Yvette Kong (born 1993), Hong Kong competitive Olympic swimmer
- Yvette Lapointe (1912–1994), Canadian pioneer of Quebec comics
- Yvette Lee Bowser (born 1965), U.S. television writer and producer
- Yvette Lewis (athlete) (born 1985), Panamaian track and field athlete
- Yvette Lu, Canadian independent film and stage actress, singer, composer, writer and producer
- Yvette Marie Stevens (born 1953), American singer, better known as Chaka Khan
- Yvette Michele (born 1972), U.S. R&B singer
- Yvette Mimieux (1942–2022), U.S. film and television actress
- Yvette Nicole Brown (born 1971), U.S. actress
- Yvette Nipar (born 1964), American actress
- Yvette of Huy (1158–1228), Christian prophetess and anchoress
- Yvette Overdyck, New Zealand architect
- Yvette Rekangali, Gabonese politician
- Yvette Roudy (born 1929), French politician
- Yvette Sylvander, one half of Swedish cover model twins Yvette and Yvonne Sylvander
- Yvette Tollar, Canadian jazz vocalist
- Yvette Vickers (1928–2010s), U.S. actress, pin-up model and singer
- Yvette Williams (1929–2019), New Zealand athlete
- Yvette Wilson (1964–2012), U.S. comedian and actress
- Yvette Young, American musician

=== Fictional characters ===
- Yvette Carte-Blanche, a fictional character in the British comedy series ''Allo 'Allo!
- Yvette, the codename of the fictional organiser of the Belgian escape organisation for allied bomber pilots, Lifeline, in the BBC television series Secret Army
- Yvette Saywell, the protagonist of D. H. Lawrence's The Virgin and the Gipsy
- Yvette, the maid and secondary character in the movie Clue
- Yvette, one of the main six Groovy Girls, a doll series manufactured by Manhattan Toy
- Yvette Durelle, the title character's love interest in Mordecai Richler's The Apprenticeship of Duddy Kravitz
- Yvette Gabriella Montilyet, Josephine's younger sister in Dragon Age Inquisition.
- Yvette Samoris by Guy de Maupassant
- Yvette Woodgrove, supporting character in Futari wa Pretty Cure (originally named Yoshimi Takenouchi)
