= John Ekels =

Canadian sailor (born 1940)

Personal information
- Nationality: CAN
- Born: 2 December 1940 (age 85) Batavia, Dutch East Indies since 1942 Jakarta, Indonesia
- Height: 188 cm (6 ft 2 in)
- Weight: 98 kg (216 lb)

Sailing career
- Sport: Sailing
- Class: Soling
Medal record
Sailing
Representing Canada
Olympic Games
Bronze medal – third place	1972 Munich	Soling

John Ekels (born 2 December 1940) is a Canadian sailor. He won a bronze medal in the Soling Class at the 1972 Summer Olympics. Ekels was inducted in the Canadian Sailing Hall of Fame on 3 October 2021.
