= Yves Durand =

Yves Durand may refer to:

- Yves Durand (politician) (born 1946), French politician
- Yves Durand (academic) (1932–2004), French academic
