= Yves Michaud =

Yves Michaud may refer to:

- Yves Michaud (philosopher) (born 1944), French philosopher
- Yves Michaud (politician) (1930-2024), Quebec politician
