= Hans-Joachim Berndt =

German sailor (born 1949)

Hans-Joachim Berndt (born 8 June 1949) is a former German sailor who competed in the 1972 Summer Olympics.
