= Eugènia Balcells =

Spanish artist (1943–2026)

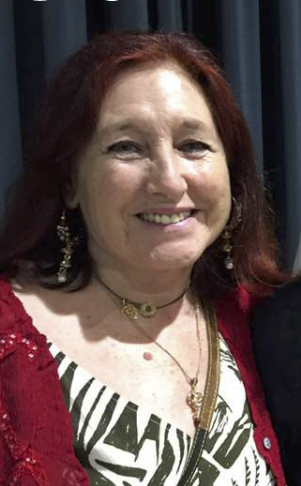
- Balcells in 2019
- Born: 12 May 1943; Barcelona, Spain
- Died: 1 March 2026 (aged 82); Barcelona, Spain
- Education: University of Barcelona
- Occupation: Visual artist

Eugènia Balcells (12 May 1943 – 1 March 2026) was a Spanish-Catalan visual artist.

== Life and career ==
Balcells was born in Barcelona on 12 May 1943. A graduate in technical architecture from the University of Barcelona, she began presenting her work to the public in the 1970s. She specialized in video and visual art working with Eulàlia Grau in the United States. Her later works were acquired by the Generalitat de Catalunya.

Balcells died of cancer in Barcelona on 1 March 2026, at the age of 82.

== Notable works ==
- Supermercart (1976)
- Ofertes (1977)
- Boy Meets Girl (1977)
- Fugue (1979)
- Going Through Languages (1981)
- Jardí de Llum (2002)
- Freqüències (2009)

== Awards ==
- Creu de Sant Jordi (2025)
