= Jean-Yves Verd'hurt =

French archaeologist

Jean-Yves Verd'hurt (born c. 1940) is a retired French property agent and amateur Egyptologist.

In September 2004, he claimed, along with his colleague Gilles Dormion, to have discovered a corridor inside the Great Pyramid of Giza which he believes could lead directly to the burial chamber of Pharaoh Khufu.
