= Jean-Yves Lacoste =

French philosopher

Jean-Yves Lacoste (French: [lakɔst]; born 1953) is a French philosopher.

Lacoste is associated with what Dominique Janicaud called the "theological turn in phenomenology", along with other influential French phenomenologists like Michel Henry, Jean-Luc Marion and Jean-Louis Chrétien. Lacoste's work straddles philosophy and theology, and displays an interest in what might be called postmodern themes. He works in Paris and Cambridge and has a life membership at Clare Hall, Cambridge.

Lacoste's influential 1994 book Experience and the Absolute argues against the modern prizing of "religious experience" and defends the view that God is knowable as lovable but does not give himself by way of experience or feeling.

In 2010, Lacoste delivered the James W. Richards lectures at the University of Virginia while he was a visiting professor of Religious Studies. His paper, "From Theology to Theological Thinking", called for erasing rigid distinctions between philosophical and theological disciplines.

In a recent Preface to In Search of Speech, the latest English translation (by the distinguished British Anglican theologian Oliver O'Donovan), Jean-Luc Marion describes the unique challenges of Lacoste's unassuming erudition and identifies Lacoste as "at the forefront of those who think philosophically without being trapped in a philosophy." He states that "the great methodological lesson of Lacoste's entire work" is that "a true theologian must become philosophical enough not to remain so philosophical as to fail to enter into his own hermeneutical situation."

== Publications ==
- Note sur le temps: Essai sur les raisons de la mémoire et de l'espérance, Paris, PUF,1990.
- Expérience et absolu: Questions disputées sur l'humanité de l'homme (Experience and the Absolute: Disputed Questions on the Humanity of Man, Paris, PUF, 1994.)
- Le Monde et l'absence d'oeuvre, Paris, PUF, 2000.
- Dictionnaire critique de théologie, ed., (Encyclopedia of Christian Theology, New York : Routledge, 2005)
- Narnia, monde théologique ? Paris, Ad Solem, 2005.
- Présence et parousie. Paris, Ad Solem, 2006
- La phénoménalité de Dieu : Neuf études, Paris, Cerf, 2008. (The Appearing of God, Oxford, 2018).
- Histoire de la théologie, ed. Paris, Seuil, 2009.
- Être en danger, Paris, Cerf, 2011.
- From Theology to Theological Thinking. University of Virginia Press, 2014.
- Recherches sur la parole Leuven, Peeters, 2015. (In Search of Speech), Bloomsbury, 2025.
- L'intuition sacramentelle Paris, Ad Solem, 2015.
- Thèses sur le vrai, Paris, PUF, 2018.
- Le différend du temps et de l'histoire, Paris, PUF, 2024.
