= David Miller (sailor) =

Canadian sailor

Medal record

Sailing

Representing Canada

Olympic Games
Bronze medal – third place	1972 Munich	Soling

David Miller (born 18 September 1943 in Vancouver, British Columbia) is a Canadian sailor. He won a bronze medal in the Soling Class at the 1972 Summer Olympics.
