= Ralph B. Ives =

American businessman

Ralph B. Ives (January 17, 1873 – January 2, 1934) was chairman and president of the Aetna Fire Co. of Hartford from 1923 until September 1933, when he retired because of ill health.

He was born in Hartford and began working for Aetna as a clerk in 1904. He was chairman of the New England Insurance Exchange in 1910 and 1911. He became a vice president of Aetna in 1919, running their Western department from Chicago until 1923, when he succeeded William B. Clark as president of Aetna.

He married Edith King on November 3, 1897, and they had a son and two daughters.
