= Jean-Yves Pollock =

French linguist

Jean-Yves Pollock (born 18 February 1946 in Paris) is a French linguist.

A specialist in comparative syntax, Pollock is best known for his work on verb movement and the structure of IP in French and English.
