= Paul Côté =

Canadian sailor (1944–2013)

Medal record

Sailing

Representing Canada

Olympic Games
| Bronze medal – third place | 1972 Munich | Soling |

Paul Côté (28 January 1944 – 19 July 2013) was a Canadian sailor. He won a bronze medal in the Soling Class at the 1972 Summer Olympics. Côté was co-founder of Greenpeace and headed many successful business ventures in Canada and the United States, including Genstar and Newland Group.
