= Antti Iivari =

Finnish ice hockey player

- Born: March 11, 1992 (age 33); Rovaniemi, Finland
- Height: 5 ft 11 in (180 cm)
- Weight: 183 lb (83 kg; 13 st 1 lb)
- Position: Forward
- Shoots: Left
- SM-liiga team: Lahti Pelicans
- NHL draft: Undrafted
- Playing career: 2012–present

Antti Iivari (born March 11, 1992) is a Finnish ice hockey player. He is currently playing with Lahti Pelicans in the Finnish SM-liiga.

Iivari made his SM-liiga debut playing with Lahti Pelicans during the 2012–13 SM-liiga season.
