= Royal Tarragona Yacht Club =

Coordinates: 41°06′15″N 01°15′00″E

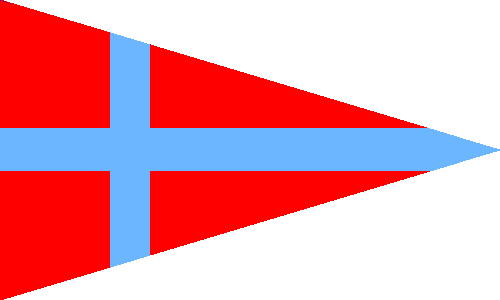
- Burgee
- Short name: RCNT
- Founded: 1878
- Location: Tarragona, Spain
- Website: http://www.rcntarragona.com

The Royal Tarragona Yacht Club (Catalan: Reial Club Nàutic de Tarragona (RCNT), Spanish: Real Club Náutico de Tarragona) is a yacht club based in Tarragona. It is one of the oldest yacht clubs in Catalonia, Spain.

This club is located at one end of the Port of Tarragona. It is a well-equipped yacht club, with its own yacht harbor as well as an adjacent area housing the club's premises, a locally well-known Sailing School, as well as a restaurant and cafeteria.

The club's harbor has a 500 m2 mooring area.

The Reial Club Nàutic de Tarragona has participated in many sailing competitions during its long existence. It has also won a great number of awards.

== History ==
The Royal Tarragona Yacht Club was established in 1878. In the beginning it was locally known as "Club dels Xiflats" ("Club of the Dim-witted" in Catalan), for at that time no one in this harbor town understood why the club's first members would engage for pleasure in rowing and sailing, the arduous task of sailors and fishermen.

The RCNT's first building was destroyed during a seasonal flood of the Francolí River in 1917. Following its reconstruction the building was badly damaged by bombs during the 1936–1939 Spanish Civil War, after which it was only repaired in 1945.

In the 1960s the club opened its Escola de Marineria, a Sailing School which quickly earned a good reputation for promoting interest in water sports among the youth in Tarragona.

During the last decades of the 20th century the Royal Tarragona Yacht Club expanded quickly thanks to the assistance of the Tarragona Port Authority in the construction of its new harbor premises outside of the heavily-polluted commercial harbor. The new RCNT building was inaugurated by the King of Spain, in 1997.

The Royal Tarragona Yacht Club celebrated its 125th anniversary in 2003 amid much fanfare among its members and local authorities.
