= Senator Ives =

Senator Ives may refer to:

- Edward H. Ives (1819–1892), Wisconsin State Senate
- Eugene S. Ives (1859–1917), New York State Senate
- Gideon S. Ives (1846–1927), Minnesota State Senate
- Irving Ives (1896–1962), U.S. Senator from New York from 1947 to 1959
