= Ivens =

Ivens is a Germanic surname. Notable people with the surname include:

- Dirk Ivens, Belgian musician
- Frances Ivens (1870–1944), English obstetrician and gynecologist
- Jonas Ivens (born 1984), Belgian footballer and manager
- Joris Ivens (1898–1989), Dutch filmmaker
- Martin Ivens (born 1958), English journalist
- Roberto Ivens (1850–1898), Portuguese explorer and naval officer
- T C Ivens, (1921–1988) English reservoir fly angler and author
- Terri Ivens (born 1967), American actress and author
- William Ivens (1878–1957), English-Canadian leading figure in the Winnipeg General Strike

== See also ==
- Ivins (disambiguation)
