= Sayula II =

Sailboat designed in America, made in Finland

- Nation: Mexico
- Designer(s): Sparkman & Stephens

Racing career
- Skippers: Ramón Carlín
- Notable victories: 1973–74 Whitbread

Sayula II is a Swan 65 yacht designed by Sparkman & Stephens. She won the 1973–74 Whitbread Round the World Race skippered by Ramón Carlín. In 2016, the race was featured in a documentary film called The Weekend Sailor.

== 1973–74 Sayula II crew ==
The race crew was: Ramón Carlín, Francisca “Paquita” Larios, Enrique Carlin, Adolfo “Cantis” Orenday, Roberto Cubas Carlin, Francisco Reyes Carlin, Butch Darylmple-Smith, Keith Lorence, David Bowen, Bob Martin, Ray Conrady, and Tjerk Romke de Vries.
