= Yves Fortier =

Yves Fortier may refer to:

- Yves Fortier (geologist) (1914–2014), former head of the Geological Survey of Canada
- Yves Fortier (lawyer) (born 1935), Canadian trial lawyer, arbitrator, corporate director, businessman and diplomat
