= Yves Trudeau =

Yves Trudeau may refer to:

- Yves Trudeau (artist) (1930–2017), Canadian artist and sculptor
- Yves Trudeau (biker) (1946–2008), Canadian Hell's Angel, serial killer, and mass murderer

== See also ==
- Yves (disambiguation)
- Trudeau (disambiguation)
