= Ivo Indzhev =

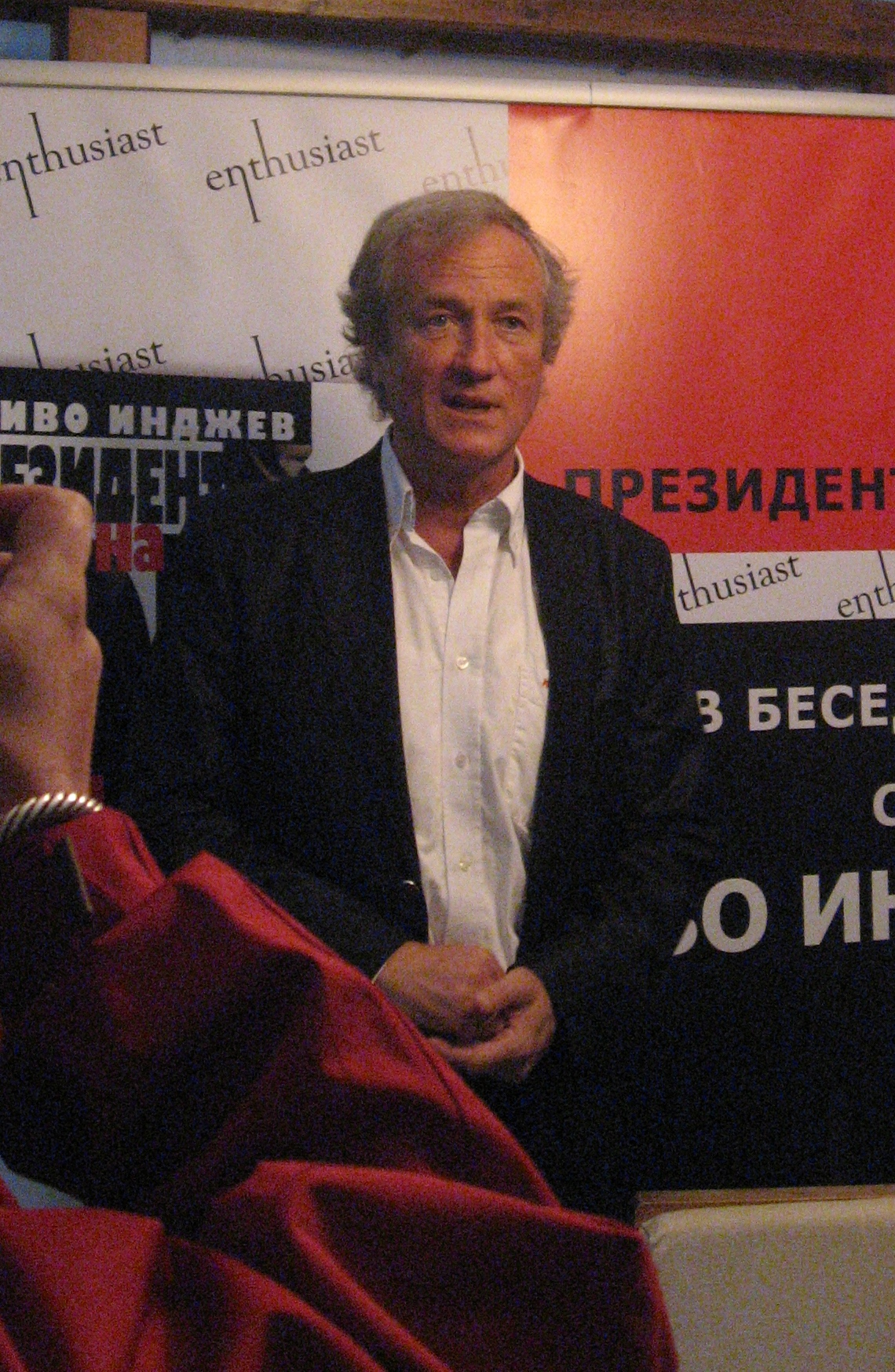
- Born: April 16, 1955 (age 71); Sofia, Bulgaria
- Occupation: blogger
- Website: http://ivo.bg/

Ivo Indzhev (Bulgarian: Иво Инджев) is a Bulgarian journalist, blogger and former TV presenter. He is also an author of best-selling books; since 2009 he has published seven books in Bulgarian. As a journalist, Ivo Indzhev is one of the Bulgarians authors who are quoted regularly in foreign media, especially when discussing the relations between Russia and Bulgaria. He is the author of commentaries for Radio Free Europe and BBC. He is also a deputy chairman of the Ethics Commission in the electronic media – broadcasting in Bulgaria.

== Biography ==
=== Education ===
Ivo Indzhev graduated history and Arabic language in Moscow and speaks four languages.

=== Professional career ===
- 1983 – 1987

Correspondent for BTA (Bulgarian Telegraph Agency, Sofia) in Beirut, Lebanon

- 1990 – 1993

Director general of BTA (Bulgarian Telegraph Agency, Sofia)

- 1993 – 1994

Editor in chief of the Bulgarian national daily newspaper “Express”

- 1994 – 1995

Editor in chief of the Bulgarian national daily newspaper “Demokratsia” (Democracy)

- 1994 – 1996

Vice president of the Association of European Journalists

- 1995 – 2000

Commentator and analyst at Radio Free Europe

- 2000 – 2006

Host of the TV Show “On Target” on bTV (Bulgarian Television, Balkan News Corporation)

- 2008 - today

Writing in his own blog http://ivo.bg/. He had nearly 3,000 posts and about 14 million views by the summer of 2013. In 2015, his blog had registered already 4,000 publications, 22 million viewers, and more than 100,000 comments.

== TV Show “On Target” scandal ==
On 8 October 2006, in his to become last edition of the TV show "On Target", of which he was the anchor, Mr. Indzhev asked his guest about information he got by email. The email was about an apartment, which allegedly belonged to the President of the Republic Georgi Parvanov, who was running for re-election at that time. A couple of days later the contract between Ivo Indzhev and bTV was terminated, after bTV accused him of gross violation of journalistic ethics and basic principles of serious journalism. Mr. Indzhev said that bTV was a subject of pressure from the President's office for months, and the result was inevitable.

== Awards ==
- Awarded a certificate for most nominated person of the year at the 2009 Bulgarian Helsinki Committee
- Annual awards for contribution to human rights

== Books ==
(in Bulgarian)

- Indzhev, Ivo (2009). Silence is evil (Мълчанието е злото). Център за социални практики. ISBN 978-954-9853-20-9.
- Indzhev, Ivo (2010). President of the RB (Президент на РъБъ). Enthusiast. ISBN 978-954-8657-11-2.
- Indzhev, Ivo (2011). Liquid Friendship (Течна дружба). Enthusiast. ISBN 978-954-8657-77-8.
- Indzhev, Ivo, Kotev, Georgi (2012). Nuclearlin (Ядреналин). Enthusiast. ISBN 978-954-2958-64-2.
- Indzhev, Ivo (2013). Prime-Minister of the RB (Премиер на РъБъ). Ciela Norma AD. ISBN 978-954-28-1301-9.
- Indzhev, Ivo (2014). Liquid Friendship 2 (Течна дружба 2). Ciela Norma AD. ISBN 978-954-28-1533-4.
- Indzhev, Ivo (2015). Liquid Friendship 3 - The Russian hybrid wars against Bulgaria through the centuries (Течна дружба 3). Ciela Norma AD. ISBN 978-954-28-1697-3.
