= Jean-Yves Pellerin =

French sailor (born 1948)

Jean-Yves Pellerin (born 29 October 1948) is a French sailor who competed in the 1972 Summer Olympics.
