= Ramón Balcells Rodón =

Spanish sailor

Personal information
- Full name: Ramón Balcells Rodón
- Nickname: Balcells
- Nationality: Spanish
- Born: 17 November 1919 Valls, Spain
- Died: 31 March 1999 (aged 79) Barcelona, Spain
- Height: 1.76 m (5.8 ft)

Sailing career
- Sport: Sailing
- Club: Real Club Marítimo de Barcelona
- Classes: Snipe, Finn, Soling

Ramón Balcells Rodón (17 November 1919 in Valls – 31 March 1999 in Barcelona) was a sailor from Spain.

Balcells won the Snipe Spanish National Championship in 1945 and represented his country at the 1952 Summer Olympics in Harmaja. Balcells took 10th place in the Finn. With his son Ramón Balcells and Juan Llort as fellow crew members, Balcells returned to the 1972 Summer Olympics in Kiel. Balcells then took 9th place in the Soling.
