= Yves Simon (philosopher) =

French philosopher (1903–1961)

Yves René Marie Simon (French: [simɔ̃]; 14 March 1903 – 11 May 1961) was a French Catholic political philosopher.

== Life ==
Simon studied under Jacques Maritain at the Institut Catholique de Paris. He taught at the Institut Catholique de Lille from 1930 to 1938. In 1938, he went to the University of Notre Dame in South Bend, Indiana, as a visiting professor. He was unable to return to France because of World War II, and after the war he remained as a professor at Notre Dame until 1948. He then joined the Committee on Social Thought, at the University of Chicago. He remained at the University of Chicago until retiring in 1958 due to illness. He died of cancer in South Bend, Indiana on 11 May 1961. In 1975, Maurice Cranston called him one of the world's "most original and distinguished political theorists."

Simon left many materials unfinished at his death, and many of his publications have only appeared after his death. His son, Anthony O. Simon, has taken on the role of director of the Yves R. Simon Institute, which contributes to the effort to publish such materials. Simon's papers are at the University of Notre Dame.

== Scholarship ==
Simon trained to work in the realm of Thomism or scholastic philosophy. According to John Dawson's biography of Gödel, Simon attended Kurt Gödel's logic lectures at Notre Dame in the late 1930s (as would be expected of a mind near the center of the Cracow Circle). Thus, in 1955, he was one of several contributors to the translating of John of St. Thomas into English.

However, he is better known for his work in moral and political philosophy. There, he defended the traditional Thomistic account of moral action and the virtues. He was an ardent defender of the proposition that this traditional account was compatible with liberal democracy in the West, arguing that French Catholics had erred in holding that the Catholic faith supported their adherence to monarchy, à la Action Française.

== Bibliography ==
- A General Theory of Authority.
- Philosophy of Democratic Government.
- The Definition of Moral Virtue.
- The Tradition of Natural Law: A Philosopher's Reflections.
- Freedom and Community.
- Work, Society, and Culture.
- A Critique of Moral Knowledge.
- The Great Dialogue of Nature and Space.
- An Introduction to Metaphysics of Knowledge.
- Philosopher at Work (a collection of articles).

Works about his thinking include:

- Vukan Kuic, Yves R. Simon: Real Democracy (Rowman & Littlefield 1999).
- Thomas R. Rourke, A Conscience as Large as the World: Yves R. Simon Versus the Catholic Neoconservatives (Rowman & Littlefield 1997).
- Anthony O. Simon, Acquaintance with the Absolute: The Philosophy of Yves R. Simon (Fordham University Press 1996) (introduction by Rev. James V. Schall, S.J.; essays on six aspects of Simon's thought by six different scholars; and a 100-page bibliography compiled by Anthony O. Simon).

== See also ==
- Neo-Thomism
