= Ramón Balcells Comas =

Spanish sailor

Ramón Balcells
Personal information
- Full name: Ramón Balcells Comas
- Nationality: Spanish
- Born: 6 August 1951 (age 75) Barcelona, Spain
- Height: 1.72 m (5.6 ft)

Sailing career
- Sport: Sailing
- Club: Real Club Marítimo de Barcelona
- Class: Soling
- Updated on 28 February 2014

Ramón Balcells Comas (born 6 August 1951 in Barcelona) is a sailor from Spain.

Balcells represented his country at the 1972 Summer Olympics in Kiel. Balcells took 9th place in the Soling with his father Ramón Balcells Rodón as helmsman and Juan Llort as fellow crew member.
