= Ville-Marie borough council =

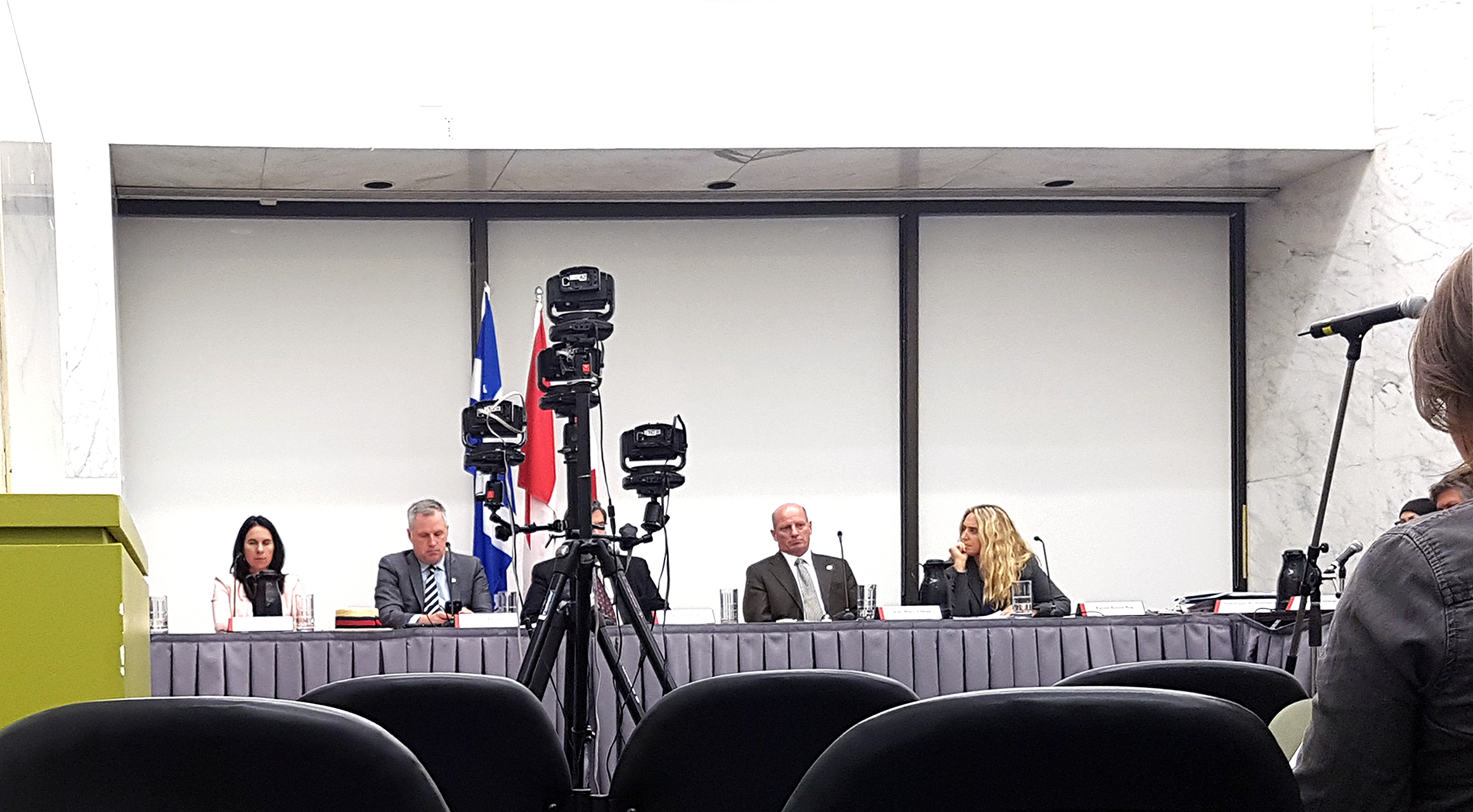
The Ville-Marie borough council meeting, 13 September 2016. On the left, then-city councilor and current (since 2017) mayor of Montreal Valérie Plante.

The Ville-Marie borough council is the local governing body of Ville-Marie, a borough in the City of Montreal, Canada.

The Ville-Marie council has a different structure from all other Montreal borough councils. Before 2009, the council consisted of an elected borough mayor, two elected city councillors, and two elected borough councillors. Under legislation passed by the government of Quebec in 2008 and implemented after the 2009 municipal election, however, the council now consists of three elected city councillors, the mayor of Montreal (who automatically serves as mayor of Ville-Marie), and two councillors from other boroughs who are selected by the mayor. The current mayor of Ville-Marie is Valérie Plante, who was elected as mayor of Montreal in the 2017 Montreal municipal election and re-elected in the 2021 election.

At the first council meeting following the 2009 election, several members of the public expressed opposition to having a borough mayor and two councillors who were not locally elected. Despite some local efforts, the change made in 2008 has not yet been reversed.

== Current members ==
District	Position	Name	Party
—	Borough mayor (as mayor of Montreal)	Valérie Plante	Projet Montréal
Peter-McGill	City councillor	Serge Sasseville	
Saint-Jacques	City councillor	Robert Beaudry	Projet Montréal
Sainte-Marie	City councillor	Sophie Mauzerolle	Projet Montréal
—	Borough councillors (appointed by the mayor from Montreal City Council)	Vicki Grondin (City councillor for Lachine)	Projet Montréal
—	Borough councillors (appointed by the mayor from Montreal City Council)	Alia Hassan-Cournol (City councillor for Mercier–Hochelaga-Maisonneuve)	Projet Montréal
