= List of people with given name Ivan =

This is a list of notable people with the given name Ivan.

== Notable people ==
=== Mononymously known as Ivan ===
- Ivan (footballer, born 1984), Brazilian football player
- Ivan (footballer, born 1997), Brazilian football player
- Ivan (model) (Liera Manuel Ivan, born 1984), Japanese fashion model and musician
- Iván (singer) (Juan Carlos Ramos Vaquero, born 1959 or 1962), Spanish singer
- Ivan (Belarusian-Russian singer) (Alexander Ivanov), Belarusian-Russian singer
- Ivan, German codename of Serbian spy Duško Popov

=== Royalty ===
- Ivan Vladislav, Bulgarian emperor (1015–1018)
- Ivan Asen I, Bulgarian emperor (1189–1196)
- Kaloyan, Bulgarian emperor (1197–1207)
- Ivan Asen II, Bulgarian emperor (1218–1241)
- Ivan II, Bulgarian emperor (1298–1299)
- Ivan Stephen, Bulgarian emperor (1330–1331)
- Ivan Alexander, Bulgarian emperor (1331–1371)
- Ivan Shishman, Bulgarian emperor in Tarnovo (1371–1395)
- Ivan Stratsimir, Bulgarian emperor in Vidin (1356–1396)
- Ivan III Fyodorovich, Grand Prince of Ryazan (1427–1456)
- Ivan IV Vasilyevich, Grand Prince of Ryazan (1467–1500)
- Ivan V Ivanovich, Grand Prince of Ryazan (1496–1533)
- Ivan I, "The Moneybag", Grand Duke of Moscow (1325–1340)
- Ivan II, "The Fair", Grand Duke of Moscow (1353–1359)
- Ivan III, "The Great", Grand Prince of Moscow (1462–1505)
- Ivan IV, "The Terrible", Russian tsar (1547–1584)
- Ivan V, Russian tsar (1682–1696)
- Ivan VI, Russian emperor (1740–1741)

=== Nobility ===
- Ivanko, a Bulgarian boyar who killed Tsar Ivan Asen I in 1196
- John Horvat (Ivan Horvat, d. 1394), Hungarian-Croatian nobleman, Ban of Macsó (1376–1381, and 1385–1386)
- John of Palisna (Ivan od Paližne, d. 1391), Hungarian-Croatian nobleman, Ban of Croatia (1385–1386)
- Ivanko, a Bulgarian despot of the Despotate of Dobruja, ruled 1385–1399
- Ivan Bohun (died 1664), colonel of Ukrainian Cossacks
- Ivan Bot, Hungarian-Croatian nobleman, Ban of Croatia (1493)
- Ivan Cherkasov (1692–1758), Russian Baron, privy councillor, cabinet secretary
- Ivan Mazepa, Hetman of Zaporizhian Host in Ukraine
- Ivan Mažuranić, Austro-Hungarian nobleman, Ban of Croatia (1873–1880), and poet
- Ivan Mikhailovich Viskovatyi (died 1570), Russian diplomat and head of the foreign ministry
- Ivan Pidkova (died 1578), Ukrainian Cossack leader
- Ivan Rimsky-Korsakov (1754–1831), Russian courtier and lover of Catherine the Great
- Ivan Samoylovych (died 1690), Cossack hetman of Left-bank Ukraine
- Ivan Shuvalov (1727–1797), Russian nobleman, favorite of Elizabeth of Russia
- Ivan Sirko (c. 1610–1680), Ukrainian Cossack military leader
- Ivan Sulyma, Ukrainian Cossack leader
- Ivan Tararui-Khovansky (died 1682), Russian boyar who led the Streltsy during the Moscow Uprising of 1682
- Ivan Tolstoy (1806–1867), Russian diplomat, senator, and minister of postal service
- Ivan Vorontsov (1719–1786), president of the Collegium of Estates in Moscow

=== Clergy ===
- Ivan Lee (1955 or 1956–2020), Australian Anglican bishop
- Ivan Rilski (John of Rila), Bulgarian Orthodox hermit and patron saint (876–946)
- Ivan Šaško (born 1966), Croatian Roman Catholic prelate and theologian also Auxiliary Bishop of Zagreb since 2008

=== Military ===
- Ivan Bagramyan, a Soviet/Armenian general
- Ivan Bella, a Slovak Air Force officer
- Ivan Belov, a Soviet Komandarm 1st rank
- Ivan Čermak, a Croatian general
- Ivan Chernyshyov, a Russian General Admiral
- Ivan Naumovich Dubovoy, a Soviet Komandarm 2nd rank
- Ivan Vasilievich Dubovoy, a Soviet major general of tank forces and a Hero of the Soviet Union
- Ivan Fersen, a Russian military commander and general of the infantry
- Ivan Kolev, a Bulgarian general during First World War
- Ivan Konev, a Marshal of the Soviet Union
- Ivan Korade, a Croatian Army general
- Ivan Smirnov, a Russian revolutionary, participant in the civil war
- Ivan Sorokin, a Russian revolutionary, Commander of the 11th Red Army
- Ivan Lytvynchuk, a Colonel of the Ukrainian Insurgent Army
- Ivan Mihailov, a Bulgarian revolutionary
- Ivan Milutinović, a Yugoslav Partisan general
- Ivan Ivanovich Möller-Sakomelsky a General of the Russian Empire
- Ivan Omelianovych-Pavlenko a colonel general in the army of the Ukrainian People's Republic
- Ivan Paskevich, a Russian military leader, General-feldmarshal
- Ivan Pokaz, a Croatian general, deputy head of intelligence at the General Staff of the Armed Forces
- Ivan S. Pavlović, a Serbian officer
- Ivan Tertel, Belarusian military leader, lieutenant general, chairman of the KGB RB
- Ivan Valkov, a Bulgarian general during First World War and later Minister of War
- Ivan Visin, a naval captain of the Austrian Navy

=== Politics ===
- Ivan Abramov (born 1978), senator of Russian Federation from Amur Oblast
- Ivan Ahčin (1897–1960), Slovene sociologist, publicist, journalist, author, and politician
- Ivan Benediktov (1902–1983), Soviet politician
- Ivan Danielsson (1880–1963), Swedish diplomat
- Ivan Dassanayake (1910–??), Sri Lankan Sinhala Member of Parliament for Wariyapola
- Iván Duque Márquez (born 1976), President of Colombia
- Ivan Evstratiev Geshov (1849–1924), 18th Prime Minister of Bulgaria
- Ivan Fadeev (1906–1976), Soviet economist and politician
- Ivan Knotek (1936–2020), Slovak politician
- Ivan Korčok (born 1964), Slovak politician
- Ivan Kostov (born 1949), 47th Prime Minister of Bulgaria
- Ivan Laluha (1932–2025), Slovak politician
- Ivan Peshev (born 1986), Bulgarian politician
- Ivan Rybkin (born 1946), 6th Chairman of the Russian Parliament
- Ivan Silayev (1930–2023), Prime Minister of the Russian SFSR
- Ivan Sierada (1879–1943) Belarusian politician
- Ivan Štefunko (born 1977), Slovak politician
- Ivan Valente (born 1946), Brazilian politician, teacher and engineer
- Ivan Varga (1953–2021), Slovak politician
- Ivan Vasyunyk (born 1959), Ukrainian politician
- Ivan Velio (1830–1899), Russian Active Privy Councillor
- Ivan Warner (1919–1994), New York politician and judge
- Ivan Zhdanov (born 1988), Russian politician

=== Sports ===
- Ivan Almeida (born 1989), Cape Verdean basketball player
- Ivan Aska (born 1990), American basketball player in the Israeli National League
- Iván Barton (born 1991), Salvadoran football referee
- Iván Campo (born 1974), Spanish footballer
- Ivan Capelli (born 1963), Italian former Formula One driver
- Ivan Cleary (born 1971), Australian Rugby League player and coach
- Iván Córdoba (born 1976), Colombian footballer
- Ivan Domingues (born 2006), Portuguese racing driver
- Iván Fandiño (1980–2017), Spanish bullfighter
- Ivan Fedotov (born 1996), Russian ice hockey goaltender
- Iván González Ferreira (born 1987), Paraguayan footballer
- Iván Helguera (born 1975), Spanish footballer
- Iván Herrera (born 2000), Panamanian baseball player
- Iván Hurtado (born 1974), Ecuadorian footballer
- Ivan Ivanov (born 1988), Bulgarian footballer and manager
- Ivan Kley (1958–2025), Brazilian tennis player
- Ivan Lee (born 1981), American Olympic saber fencer and coach
- Ivan Leko (born 1978), Croatian soccer player and coach
- Ivan Lendl (born 1960), Czech-American tennis player
- Ivan Leshinsky (born 1947), American-Israeli basketball player
- Ivan Ljubičić (born 1979), Croatian tennis player
- Ivan Majeský (born 1976), Slovak ice hockey defenseman
- Iban Mayo (born 1977), Spanish cyclist
- Ivan Miljković (born 1979), Serbian volleyball player
- Ivan Näsberg (born 1996), Norwegian footballer
- Ivan Osiier (1888–1965), Danish épée, foil, and sabre fencer, 25x Danish champion
- Ivan Pace Jr. (born 2000), American football player
- Ivan Perišić (born 1989), Croatian footballer
- Ivan Pravilov (1963–2012), Ukrainian ice hockey coach charged with child molestation
- Ivan Rakitić (born 1988), Croatian football player
- Iván Rodríguez (born 1971), Puerto Rican baseball player
- Ivan Rudež (born 1979), Croatian basketball coach
- Ivan Runje (born 1990), Croatian footballer
- Ivan Sproule (born 1981), Northern Irish footballer
- Ivan Toney (born 1996), English footballer
- Ivan Wilfred Johnson (1898–1979), Canadian hockey player
- Iván Zamorano (born 1967), Chilean footballer
- Iván Zarandona (born 1980), Equatoguinean footballer
- Ivan Zaytsev (disambiguation), several sportsmen
- Ivan Zemlyanskii (born 2010), Russian chess grandmaster
- Ivan Zucco (born 1995), Italian professional boxer

=== Arts ===
- Ivan Barias, Dominican-American music producer and songwriter
- Ivan Brunetti (born 1967), cartoonist
- Ivan Bunin (1870–1953), Russian writer and Nobel laureate in literature
- Ivan Della Mea (1940–2009), Italian singer-songwriter
- Ivan Dixon (1931–2008), American actor, director and producer
- Ivan Dorn (born 1988), Ukrainian singer and actor
- Ivan Doroschuk (born 1957), lead vocalist for Men Without Hats
- Ivan Dorschner (born 1990), Filipino-American actor, host and model
- Ivan Franko (1856–1916), Ukrainian writer
- Ivan (gorilla), painter
- Ivan Graziani (1945–1997), Italian singer-songwriter
- Ivan Jones, British writer and poet
- Ivan Klíma (1931–2025), Czech novelist and playwright
- Ivan Kozlov (1779–1840), Russian poet
- Ivan Král (1948–2020), Czech-American musician
- Ivan Meštrović (1883–1962), Croatian sculptor and architect
- Ivan Moody (born 1980), singer of heavy metal band Five Finger Death Punch
- Ivan Morley (born 1966), American painter
- Van Morrison (George Ivan Morrison, born 1945), Northern Irish singer-songwriter and musician
- Ivan Ozhogin (born 1978), Russian singer and actor
- Ivan Reitman (1946–2022), Czechoslovak-born Canadian film and television director, producer and screenwriter
- Ivan Shishmanov (1862–1928), Bulgarian writer, ethnographer, politician and diplomat
- Ivan Turgenev (1818–1893), Russian novelist
- Ivan Urgant (born 1978), Russian television personality, presenter, actor and musician
- Ivan Vazov (1850–1921), Bulgarian poet, novelist and playwright, often referred to as "the Patriarch of Bulgarian literature"

=== Science, academia, business and other ===
- Ivan Aboimov (1936–2022), Russian diplomat and ambassador
- Ivan Agayants (1911–1968), Soviet intelligence officer of Armenian origin
- Ivan Aksakov (1823–1886), Russian littérateur and notable Slavophile
- Ivan Boesky (1937–2024), Wall Street trader who inspired the character of Gordon Gekko in the film Wall Street.
- Ivan Chermayeff (1932–2017), graphic designer
- Ivan Corea, Sri Lankan Anglican priest
- Ivan Gazidis (born 1964), chief executive of the AC Milan
- Ivan Glasenberg (born 1957), CEO of Glencore, director of Xstrata and Minara Resources
- Ivan Greenberg (1896–1966), English journalist
- Ivan Hričovský (1932–2024), Slovak celebrity gardener
- Ivan Ilyin (1883–1954), Russian religious and political philosopher
- Ivan Massow (born 1967), chairman of the Institute of Contemporary Arts
- Ivan Menezes (1959–2023), CEO of Diageo, non-executive director at Coach, Inc.
- Ivan Milat, Croatian Australian serial killer famous for the backpacker killings
- Ivan Miller (1898–1967), Canadian journalist and sportscaster
- Ivan Vsevolodovich Meshcherskiy (1859–1935), Russian mathematician
- Ivan J. Parron, entertainment attorney and entrepreneur
- Ivan Pavlov (1849–1946), Russian physiologist and Nobel laureate in Medicine & Physiology
- Ivan Rogers (born 1960), British civil servant, former Permanent Representative of the United Kingdom to the European Union
- Ivan Seidenberg (born 1946), chairman & CEO at Verizon Communications
- Ivan Selin (born 1937), former chairman of the Nuclear Regulatory Commission, Fulbright scholar
- Ivan Semwanga, Ugandan-born South African philanthropist
- Ivan Šramko, (born 1957), Governor of the National Bank of Slovakia (2005–2010)
- Ivan Wettengel (1876–1935), Naval Governor of Guam

Other notable people with the given name "Ivan"

== Fictional characters ==
- Ivan Braginsky, the given name for the national personification of Russia from the anime series Hetalia: Axis Powers
- Ivan, a secondary character of Foster's Home for Imaginary Friends
- Ivan the Fool, a character of the eponymous story
- Ivan Vanko, an antagonist from the Marvel Comics franchise The Invincible Iron Man who appears as the primary antagonist in the sequel to the film adaptation
- Ivan Denisovich Shukhov, a character of One Day in the Life of Ivan Denisovich
- Ivan, a Nintendo character in the Golden Sun series
- Ivan, a Nintendo character in Devil's Third and Pokémon series
- Ivan Vassilevich Lomov, a character in Anton Chekhov's one-act play, A Marriage Proposal
- Ivan Raidenovich Raikov, a character in video game Metal Gear Solid 3: Snake Eater
- Ivan Ilych, the title character of Leo Tolstoy's book, The Death of Ivan Ilyich
- Ivan Karamazov, brother of protagonist Alyosha Karamazov, in Fyodor Dostoevsky's novel, The Brothers Karamazov
- Ivan, in the 2006 film Curious George
- Ivan Ivanovitch, a Russian painter who appears in The Smurfs. He has a magic chicken named Kiev, in which lays painted eggs.
- Ivan Veen, in Vladimir Nabokov's Ada or Ardor
- Ivan Drago, in Rocky IV
- Ivan Nikolayevich Ponyryov (Bezdomny), in Mikhail Bulgakov's novel, The Master and Margarita
- Ivan Shawbly, from the television series Mona the Vampire
- Ivan Ooze, the villain in Mighty Morphin Power Rangers: The Movie
- Sir Ivan of Zandar, the Gold Ranger in Power Rangers Dino Charge and Power Rangers Dino Super Charge
- Ivanhoe, an 1820 novel by Sir Walter Scott
- Ivan, a Western lowland Gorilla, the star and basis of the 2012 K.A. Applegate novel The One and Only Ivan and its film adaptation.
- Ivan Bruel, in the animated series Miraculous: Tales of Ladybug & Cat Noir
- Ivan Ramirez from the animated Disney cartoon Primos
- Ivan Steranko "Rocksteady", who was a former partner and old friend of Shredder in TMNT 2012
- Ivan Goncharov, antagonist based on the author of the same name of the anime Bungou Stray Dogs
- Ivan Bakirtis, in the book series Sali Sali Saluki
