= Vania =

Vania may refer to:

- Vania (caste), a social group of India
- Vania (foraminifera), a genus of fossil foraminifers
- Vania (plant), a genus of plants in the family Brassicaceae
- Vânia, or Vania, a given name (including a list of people with the name)
- Vania, an alternative spelling of the given names Vanja and Vanya
- Cyclone Vania, a tropical storm

== See also ==
- Vanniar, a social group of India
- Wania
- Vania clan
