= Pokaz =

Pokaz is a surname. Notable people with the surname include:

- Igor Pokaz (born 1968), Croatian diplomat
- Ivan Pokaz (born 1942), Croatian general
- Tomislav Pokaz (born 1975), Croatian official
