= Ivașcu =

Ivașcu is a Romanian surname, originating from the Slavic given name "Ivashka/Ivashko", "little Ivan" or Romanianization of the surname Ivashko. Notable people with the surname include:

- George Ivașcu (1911–1988), Romanian journalist, literary critic, and communist militant
- George Ivașcu (actor) (born 1968), Romanian actor
- Stelian Ivașcu (1925–2008), Romanian surgeon
