= Ivana =

- Gender: Female

Origin
- Origin: Slavic
- Meaning: Gift from God, gift from the heavens, very small, precious

Ivana (Cyrillic: Ивана) is a feminine given name of Slavic origin that is also popular in southern Ireland, France, French-speaking Canada, the Mediterranean and Latin America. It is the feminine form of the name Ivan, which are both the Slavic cognates of the names Joanna and John. It may also be spelled as Ivanna (Cyrillic: Иванна).

In Croatia, the name Ivana was the most common feminine given name between 1970 and 1999.

Variants Iva and Ivanka (Cyrillic: Иванка) are diminutives derived from Ivana. The name day is celebrated on April 4. In Croatia, the name day is celebrated on December 27. In Slovakia, the name day is celebrated on December 28. In North Macedonia, the name day is celebrated on July 7 – also known as Ivanden.

== People named Ivana ==
=== Given name ===
- Ivana (singer) (born 1969), Bulgarian singer
- Ivana Abramović (born 1983), Croatian tennis player
- Ivana Andrlová (born 1960), Czech actress
- Ivana Alawi (born 1996), Filipino actress and model
- Ivana Bacik (born 1968), Irish politician
- Ivana Banfić (born 1969), Croatian dancer and singer
- Ivana Baquero (born 1994), Spanish actress
- Ivana María Bianchi, Argentine politician
- Ivana Bojdová (born 1985), Slovak football player
- Ivana Brkljačić (born 1983), Croatian hammer thrower
- Ivana Brlić-Mažuranić (1874–1938), Croatian writer
- Ivana Chubbuck, American acting coach
- Ivana Dežić (born 1994), Croatian handball player
- Ivana Dlhopolčeková (born 1986), Slovak ice dancer
- Ivana Dojkić (born 1997), Croatian basketball player
- Ivana Dulić-Marković (born 1961), Serbian politician
- Ivana Đerisilo (born 1983), Serbian volleyball player
- Ivana Hong (born 1992), American artistic gymnast
- Ivana Hudziecová (born 1985), Czech figure skater
- Ivana Isailović (born 1986), Serbian volleyball player
- Ivana Janečková (born 1984), Czech cross country skier
- Ivana Jirešová (born 1977), Czech actress
- Ivana Kapitanović (born 1994), Croatian handball player
- Ivana Kekin (born 1984), Croatian politician
- Ivana Kindl (born 1978), Croatian singer
- Ivana Kiš (born 1979), Croatian composer
- Ivana Kobilca (1861–1926), Slovenian painter
- Ivana Kubešová (born 1962), Czech middle distance runner
- Ivana Kumpoštová, Czech Paralympic swimmer
- Ivana Lie (born 1960), Indonesian badminton player
- Ivana Lisjak (born 1987), Croatian tennis player
- Ivana Lovrić (born 1984), Croatian handball player
- Ivana Loudová (1941–2017), Czech composer
- Ivana Luković (born 1992), Serbian volleyball player
- Ivana Maksimović (born 1990), Serbian sport shooter
- Ivana Maletić (born 1973), Croatian politician
- Ivana Matović (born 1983), Serbian basketball player
- Ivana Miličević (born 1974), Bosnian-American actress
- Ivana Miloš (born 1986), Croatian volleyball player
- Ivana Mišura (born 1989), Croatian model and beauty pageant titleholder
- Ivana Nešović (born 1988), Serbian volleyball player
- Ivana Peters (born 1974), Serbian singer
- Ivana Posavec Krivec (born 1975), Croatian politician
- Ivana Reitmayerová (born 1992), Slovak figure skater
- Ivana Rosić, Serbian politician
- Ivana Santilli (born 1975), Canadian singer and musician
- Ivana Selakov (born 1978), Serbian singer
- Ivana Spagna (born 1954), Italian singer and songwriter
- Ivana Tomljenović-Meller (1906–1988), Croatian graphic designer and art teacher
- Ivana Trišić, Serbian beauty pageant titleholder
- Ivana Trump (1949–2022), Czech-American businesswoman, socialite and model
- Ivana Vanjak (born 1995), German volleyball player of Croatian origin
- Ivana Večeřová (born 1979), Czech basketball player
- Ivy Jenkins, (born Ivana Jenkins, 1983), Serbian-Canadian bassist
- Ivana Vuleta (born 1990), Serbian long-jumper
- Ivana Wong (born 1979), Hong Kong singer

=== Surname ===
- Milan Ivana (born 1983), Slovak football player

== People named Ivanna ==
- Ivanna Borovychenko (born 1990), Ukrainian racing cyclist
- Ivanna S. Pankin (born 1989), American roller derby skater
- Ivanna Israilova (born 1986), Uzbekistani-born Russian tennis player
- Ivanna Klympush-Tsintsadze (born 1972), Ukrainian politician
- Ivanna Madruga (born 1971), Argentine tennis player
- Ivanna Sakhno (born 1997), Ukrainian American actress
- Ivanna Vale (born 1992), Venezuelan model and beauty pageant titleholder

== People named Ivanka ==
- Ivanka Bonova (born 1949), Bulgarian sprinter
- Ivanka Khristova (1941–2022), Bulgarian shot-putter
- Ivanka Koleva (born 1968), Bulgarian Paralympian track and field athlete
- Ivanka Matić (born 1979), Serbian basketball player
- Ivanka Moralieva (born 1983), Bulgarian swimmer
- Ivanka Muerova, Bulgarian sprint canoer
- Ivanka Ninova, Bulgarian opera singer
- Ivanka Petrova (1951–2007), Bulgarian shot-putter
- Ivanka Raspopović (1930–2015), Serbian architect
- Ivanka Trump (born Ivana Trump, 1981), American businesswoman
- Ivanka Valkova (born 1949), Bulgarian sprinter
- Ivanka Vancheva (1953–2020), Bulgarian javelin thrower
- Ivanka Venkova (born 1952), Bulgarian sprinter

== Other uses ==
- Ivanka (horse) (born 1990) racehorse
- Ivana Baiul, fictional character in the comic books DV8 and Gen^{13}
- Ivana the Invisible, a character in Danger Mouse

== See also ==
- Ivan (name)
- Mária Ivánka (born 1950), Hungarian chess player
