= Ivashkin =

Ivashkin, feminine: Ivashkina is a Russian patronymic surname derived from the given name Ivashka or Ivashko, a diminutive for Ivan. Notable people with the surname include:

- Alexander Ivashkin,Russian cellist, writer, academic
- Anton Ivashkin, Belarusian cyclist
- Elizaveta Fedorovna Ivashkina, birth name of Elizaveta Litvinova (1845–1919?), Russian mathematician and educator
