= Ivan =

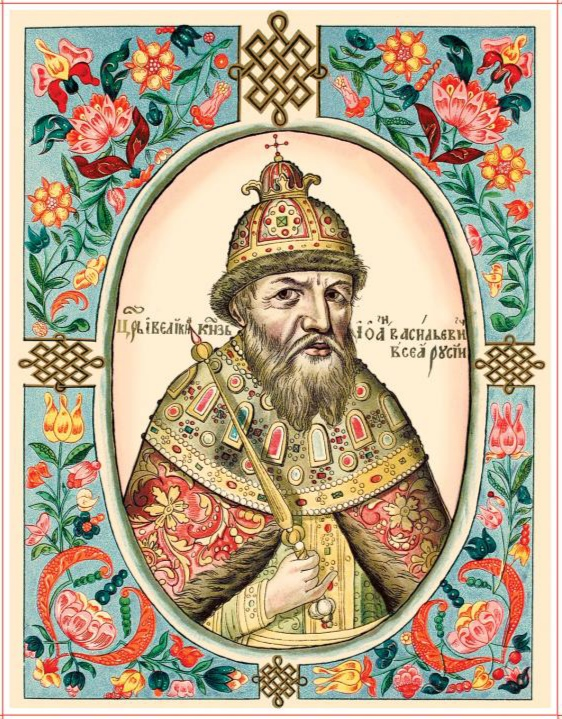
- Ivan the Terrible, the first Tsar of all Russia, reigning from 1547 to 1584
- Pronunciation: English: /ˈaɪ.vən, ɪˈvɑːn/; Bulgarian: [ɪˈvan]; Russian: [ɪˈvan]; Serbo-Croatian: [ǐʋan]
- Gender: Male

Other gender
- Feminine: Ivana

Origin
- Origin: Slavic (Old Church Slavonic Їωан), derived from Greek; ultimately from Hebrew
- Meaning: “God is Gracious"

Other names
- Related names: Jovan, Jan, Janez, Evan, Giovanni, Ifan, and "John" in other languages

Ivan (Cyrillic: Иван) is a male given name of Slavic origin, related to a variant of the Greek name Iōánnēs (English: John), which in turn derives from the Hebrew יוֹחָנָן (Yôḥānnān), meaning "God is gracious". The name is strongly associated with Slavic countries and cultures.

Ivan is a very common name in Russia, Ukraine, Croatia, Serbia, Bosnia and Herzegovina, Slovenia, Bulgaria, Belarus, North Macedonia, and Montenegro. It has also gained popularity in several Romance-speaking countries since the 20th century.

== Etymology ==
Ivan is the common Slavic Latin spelling, while Cyrillic spelling is two-fold: in Bulgarian, Russian, Macedonian, Serbian and Montenegrin it is Иван, while in Belarusian and Ukrainian it is Іван. The Old Church Slavonic (or Old Cyrillic) spelling is Їѡан.

Ivan is the Slavic relative of the Latin name Johannes, corresponding to English John and originates from New Testament Greek Ἰωάννης (Iōánnēs). The Greek name is in turn derived from Hebrew יוֹחָנָן (Yôḥānān), meaning "YHWH (God) is gracious". The name is ultimately derived from the Biblical Hebrew name יוחנן (pronounced [joχanan]), short for יהוחנן (pronounced [jehoχanan]), meaning "God was merciful". Common patronymics derived from the name are Ivanović (Serbian and Croatian), Ivanov (Russian and Bulgarian), and Ivanovich (Russian, used as patronymic), corresponding to "Ivan's son".

== Popularity ==
The name is common among Russians, Ukrainians, Belarusians, Bulgarians, Croats, Slovenes, Macedonians, Serbs, Bosnians, Montenegrins, and to a smaller extent Czechs and Slovaks.

Ivan is the most common male name in Bulgaria (as of 2013) and Croatia (as of 2013). In Serbia, it was the 9th most common male name in the period of 1971–1980; 6th in 1981–1990; 9th in 1991–2000. It is also the 6th most common name in Slovenia.

In Croatia, with over thirty thousand namesakes, the name Ivan was the most popular between 1930 and 1940, and waned in popularity from 2003 to 2013. The name Ivan was the most common masculine given name until 1959, and between 1980 and 1999.

Since the 20th century, it is becoming more popular in the Romance-speaking world; Italian (both the original form and the italianized version, Ivano), Spanish (as Iván), and Portuguese (sometimes Ivã).

Ivan (pl. die Ivans) was also occasionally used by various parties during World War II as a general name for the Soviets.

== Forms ==
Its female forms are Ivana (West and South Slavic) and Ivanna (East Slavic), while Ivanka and Iva are diminutives by origin. Slavic male diminutives (including historical) are Vanya or Vanja, Ivaniš, Ivanko, Ivanča, Ivanče, Ivashka, Ivashko, Ivanushka, etc. A shorter form of the name is Ivo.

== See also ==
- List of people with given name Ivan
- List of storms named Ivan
- Template:John-surname lists surnames derived from the given name and its variants
