= 2017 Baseball Hall of Fame balloting =

Elections to the Baseball Hall of Fame

National Baseball

Hall of Fame and Museum
- New inductees: 5
- via BBWAA: 3
- via Today's Game Era Committee: 2
- Total inductees: 317
- Induction date: July 30, 2017

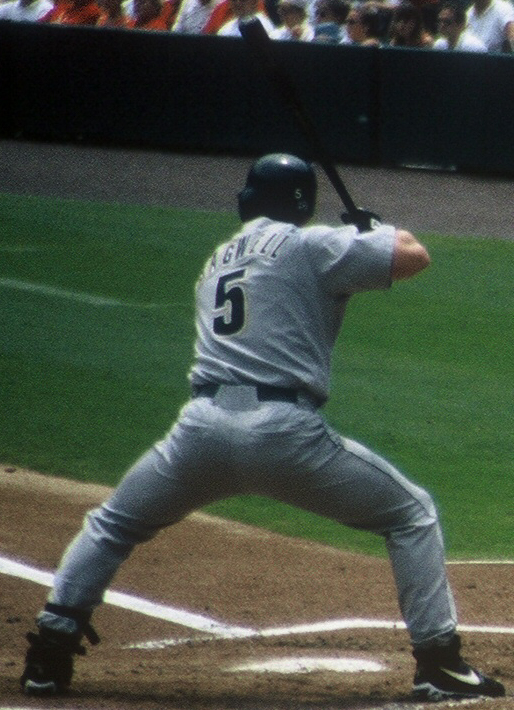
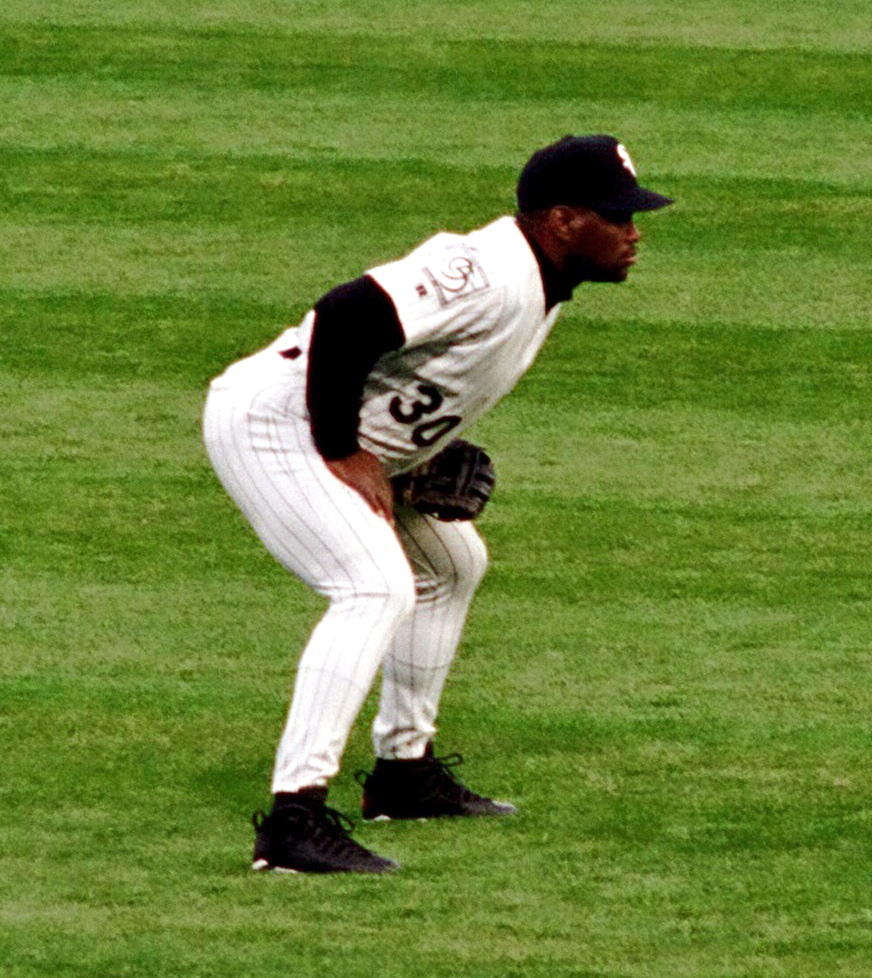
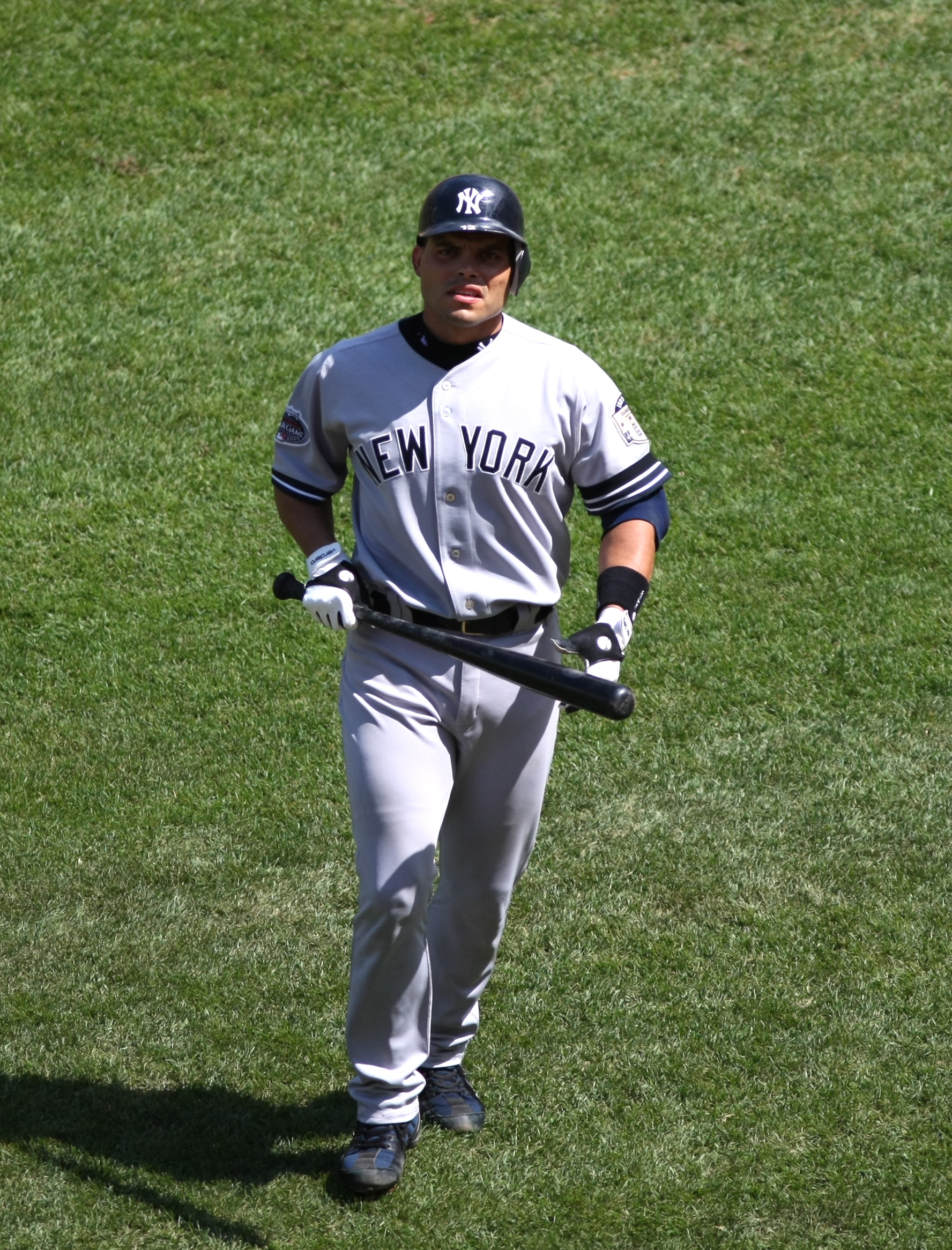
2017 BBWAA inductees (L–R): Jeff Bagwell, Tim Raines, and Iván Rodríguez

Elections to the Baseball Hall of Fame for 2017 proceeded according to rules most recently amended in 2016. As in the past, the Baseball Writers' Association of America (BBWAA) voted by mail to select from a ballot of recently retired players, with results announced on January 18, 2017. The BBWAA elected Jeff Bagwell, Tim Raines, and Iván Rodríguez to the Hall of Fame.

The three voting panels that had replaced the more broadly defined Veterans Committee following a July 2010 rules change were replaced by a new set of four panels in July 2016. The newly created Today's Game Committee convened early in December 2016 to select from a ballot of retired players and non-playing personnel who made their greatest contributions to the sport after 1987. John Schuerholz and Bud Selig were elected by this committee.

A formal induction ceremony was held in Cooperstown, New York, on July 30, 2017.

== BBWAA election ==
Key
| | Elected to the Hall of Fame on this ballot (named in **bold italics**). |
| | Elected subsequently, as of 2026 (named in plain italics). |
| | Renominated for the 2018 BBWAA election by adequate performance on this ballot and has not been elected, as of 2026. |
| | Eliminated from annual BBWAA consideration by poor performance or expiration on this ballot and has not been elected, as of 2026. |
| † | First time on the BBWAA ballot. |
| * | Eliminated from annual BBWAA consideration by poor performance or expiration on this ballot. |

On July 26, 2014, the Hall announced changes to the rules for election for recently retired players, reducing the number of years a player will be eligible to be on the ballot from fifteen years to ten. One candidate presently on the BBWAA ballot (Lee Smith) in years 10–15 was grandfathered into this system and retained his previous 15 years of eligibility. In addition, BBWAA members who were otherwise eligible to cast ballots were required to complete a registration form and sign a code of conduct before receiving their ballots, and the Hall made public the names of all members who cast ballots (but not their individual votes) when it announced the election results. The code of conduct specifically states that the ballot is non-transferable, a direct reaction to Dan Le Batard turning his 2014 Hall of Fame ballot over to the sports website Deadspin and allowing the site's readers to make his Hall votes (an act that drew him a lifetime ban from future Hall voting). Violation of the code of conduct will result in a lifetime ban from BBWAA voting.

A more recent rules change, announced on July 28, 2015, tightened the qualifications for the BBWAA electorate. Beginning with the 2016 election, eligible voters must not only have 10 years of continuous BBWAA membership, but also be currently active members, or have held active status within the 10 years prior to the election. A BBWAA member who has not been active for more than 10 years can regain voting status by covering MLB in the year preceding the election. As a result of the new rule, the vote total in 2016 decreased by 109 from the previous year, to 440.

The ballot included two categories of players:

- Candidates from the 2016 ballot who received at least 5% of the vote but were not elected, as long as they first appeared on the BBWAA ballot no earlier than 2003.
- Selected individuals, chosen by a screening committee, whose last MLB appearance was in 2011.

Players who were eligible for the first time who were not included on the ballot were: Josh Bard, Danys Báez, Milton Bradley, Russell Branyan, Juan Castro, Ramón Castro, Alex Cora, Craig Counsell, Jack Cust, Doug Davis, Adam Everett, Ryan Franklin, Ross Gload, Wes Helms, Mark Hendrickson, Scott Linebrink, Felipe López, Julio Lugo, Jason Michaels, Trever Miller, Corey Patterson, Joel Piñeiro, Dennys Reyes, Aaron Rowand, Marcus Thames, Brett Tomko, Javier Vázquez, and Chris Woodward.

442 ballots were cast, 2 more than in 2016. There were 442 total ballots cast, with 3,595 individual votes for players, an average of 8.13 players named per ballot.

Jeff Bagwell, Tim Raines and Iván Rodríguez were elected. Raines and Lee Smith were on the ballot for their final time; Smith dropped off the ballot, while Raines was the fifth player to be elected in his final ballot, after Red Ruffing, Joe Medwick, Ralph Kiner, and Jim Rice. Rodríguez was elected in his first year of eligibility.

Voting results from 2017:

| Player | Votes | Percent | Change | Year |
|---|---|---|---|---|
| **Jeff Bagwell** | 381 | 86.2% | ▲14.6% | 7th |
| **Tim Raines** | 380 | 86.0% | ▲16.2% | 10th |
| **Iván Rodríguez**† | 336 | 76.0% | – | 1st |
| Trevor Hoffman | 327 | 74.0% | ▲6.7% | 2nd |
| Vladimir Guerrero† | 317 | 71.7% | – | 1st |
| Edgar Martínez | 259 | 58.6% | ▲15.2% | 8th |
| Roger Clemens | 239 | 54.1% | ▲8.9% | 5th |
| Barry Bonds | 238 | 53.8% | ▲9.5% | 5th |
| Mike Mussina | 229 | 51.8% | ▲8.8% | 4th |
| Curt Schilling | 199 | 45.0% | ▼7.3% | 5th |
| Lee Smith | 151 | 34.2% | ▲0.1% | 15th |
| Manny Ramirez† | 105 | 23.8% | – | 1st |
| Larry Walker | 97 | 21.9% | ▲6.4% | 7th |
| Fred McGriff | 96 | 21.7% | ▲0.8% | 8th |
| Jeff Kent | 74 | 16.7% | ▲0.1% | 4th |
| Gary Sheffield | 59 | 13.3% | ▲1.7% | 3rd |
| Billy Wagner | 45 | 10.2% | ▼0.3% | 2nd |
| Sammy Sosa | 38 | 8.6% | ▲1.6% | 5th |
| Jorge Posada†* | 17 | 3.8% | – | 1st |
| Magglio Ordóñez†* | 3 | 0.7% | – | 1st |
| Edgar Rentería†* | 2 | 0.5% | – | 1st |
| Jason Varitek†* | 2 | 0.5% | – | 1st |
| Tim Wakefield†* | 1 | 0.2% | – | 1st |
| Casey Blake†* | 0 | 0% | – | 1st |
| Pat Burrell†* | 0 | 0% | – | 1st |
| Orlando Cabrera†* | 0 | 0% | – | 1st |
| Mike Cameron†* | 0 | 0% | – | 1st |
| J. D. Drew†* | 0 | 0% | – | 1st |
| Carlos Guillén†* | 0 | 0% | – | 1st |
| Derrek Lee†* | 0 | 0% | – | 1st |
| Melvin Mora†* | 0 | 0% | – | 1st |
| Arthur Rhodes†* | 0 | 0% | – | 1st |
| Freddy Sanchez†* | 0 | 0% | – | 1st |
| Matt Stairs†* | 0 | 0% | – | 1st |

== Today's Game Era Committee ==
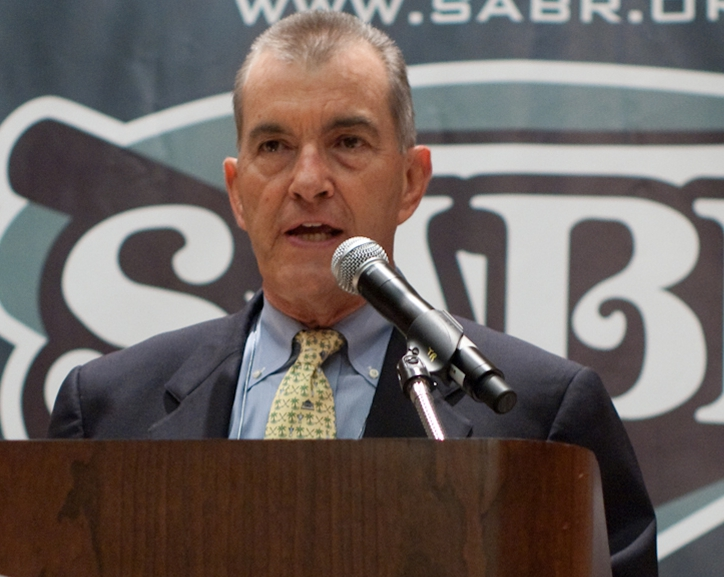
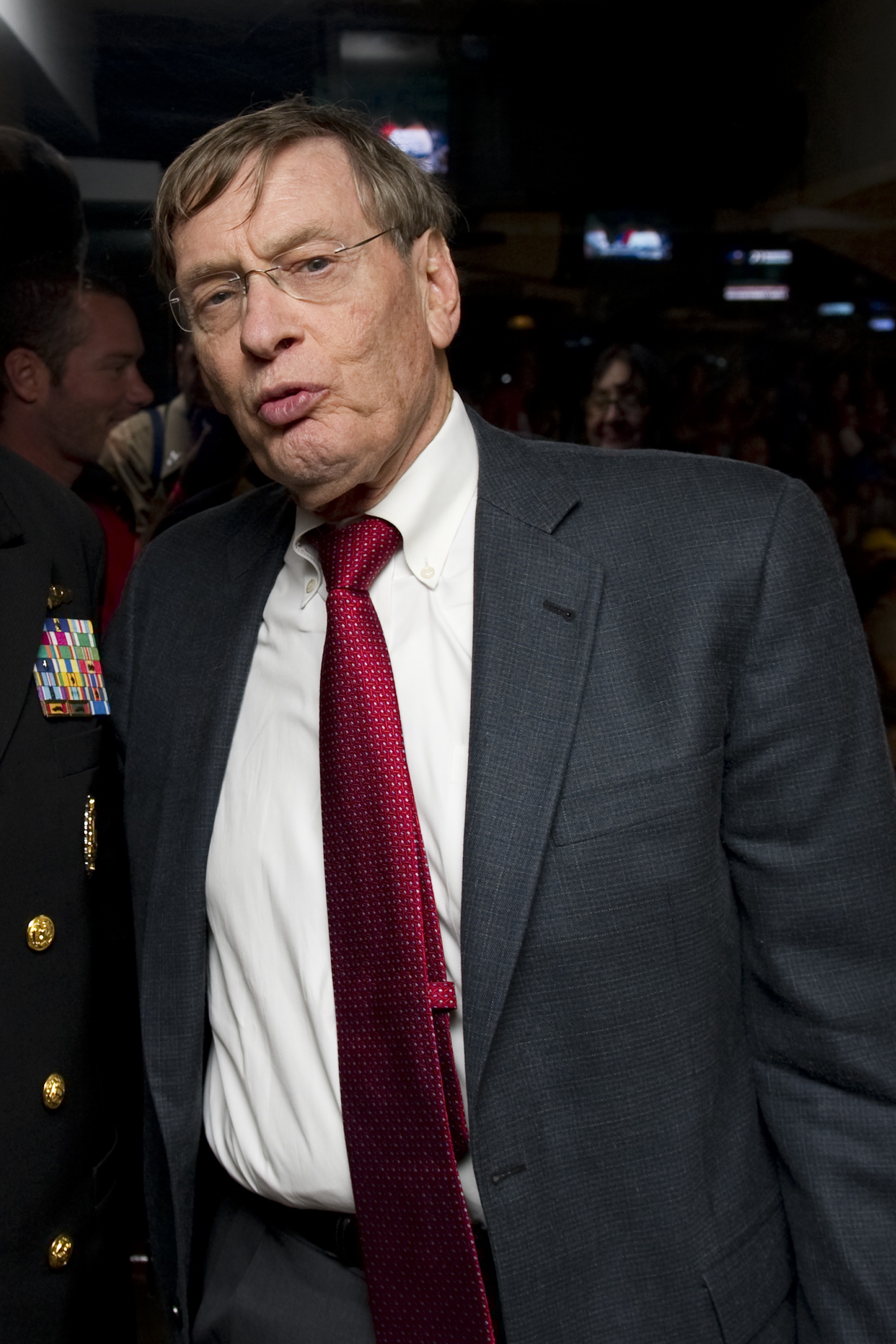
2017 Era Committee inductees John Schuerholz (left) and Bud Selig

On July 23, 2016, the Hall of Fame announced changes to the Era Committee system. The system's timeframes were restructured to place a greater emphasis on the modern game, and to reduce the frequency at which individuals from the pre-1970 game (including Negro league baseball figures) will have their careers reviewed. Considering candidates whose greatest contributions occurred in 1988 and later, the Today's Game Era Committee met in 2016 as part of the elections for the next calendar year.

On October 3, 2016, the Hall announced the 10 candidates to be considered when the Today's Game Era Committee met at the 2016 winter meetings in National Harbor, Maryland on December 4; the voting results were announced immediately after the committee met. The cutoff for election and induction remained the standard 75%, or 12 of 16 votes.

The committee consisted of the following individuals:

- Hall of Famers: Roberto Alomar, Bobby Cox, Andre Dawson, Dennis Eckersley, Pat Gillick, Ozzie Smith, Don Sutton and Frank Thomas
- Executives: Paul Beeston, Bill DeWitt, David Glass, Andy MacPhail and Kevin Towers
- Media and historians: Bill Center, Steve Hirdt, and Tim Kurkjian
- Non-voting committee chair: Jane Forbes Clark (Hall of Fame chairman)

| Candidate | Category | Votes | Percent | Ref |
|---|---|---|---|---|
| John Schuerholz | Executive | 16 | 100% | |
| Bud Selig | Executive | 15 | 93.75% | |
| Lou Piniella | Manager | 7 | 43.75% | |
| Harold Baines | Player | <5 | | |
| Albert Belle | Player | <5 | | |
| Will Clark | Player | <5 | | |
| Orel Hershiser | Player | <5 | | |
| Davey Johnson | Manager | <5 | | |
| Mark McGwire | Player | <5 | | |
| George Steinbrenner | Executive | <5 | | |

All candidates except for Steinbrenner were alive when the ballot and the voting results were announced.

== J. G. Taylor Spink Award ==
The J. G. Taylor Spink Award has been presented by the BBWAA at the annual summer induction ceremonies since 1962. Through 2010, it was awarded during the main induction ceremony, but is now given the previous day at the Hall of Fame Awards Presentation. It recognizes a sportswriter "for meritorious contributions to baseball writing". The recipients are not members of the Hall of Fame but are featured in a permanent exhibit at the National Baseball Museum.

The three finalists for the 2017 award were announced during the 2016 All-Star break.

- Jim Reeves
- Claire Smith
- Juan Vene

On December 6, during the 2016 winter meetings, Smith was named as the 2017 recipient. She received 272 of a possible 449 votes (with three ballots left blank). At the time of announcement, Smith was ESPN's news editor for remote production, with chief responsibility for incorporating news and analysis in the network's MLB-related broadcasts, as well as SportsCenter. She became the first African-American woman, and the first woman of any ethnicity, to regularly cover MLB for a newspaper when she began covering the New York Yankees for The Hartford Courant in 1983. Smith went from there to The New York Times and The Philadelphia Inquirer before joining ESPN.

== Ford C. Frick Award ==
Various changes in July 2016 were also made to the annual Ford C. Frick Award elections, presented annually to a preeminent baseball broadcaster since 1978. According to the Hall, the new criteria for selection are "Commitment to excellence, quality of broadcasting abilities, reverence within the game, popularity with fans, and recognition by peers."

Additionally, a ballot of eight candidates will now be set, down from 10 in years past. The three ballot slots previously determined by fan voting on Facebook will now be filled by a committee of historians.

A new election cycle has been established, rotating annually between Current Major League Markets (team-specific announcers) with the 2017 Frick Award; National Voices (broadcasters whose contributions were realized on a national level) with the 2018 Frick Award; and Broadcasting Beginnings (early team voices and pioneers of baseball broadcasting) with the 2019 Frick Award. This cycle will repeat every three years.

The Hall announced the ballot for the 2017 award on November 7, 2016, with voting to take place at the 2016 winter meetings on December 7. On December 7, it was announced that Bill King was the winner of the award.

- Gary Cohen
- Jacques Doucet
- Ken Harrelson
- Pat Hughes
- Bill King
- Mike Krukow
- Ned Martin
- Dewayne Staats

At the time the ballot was announced, all candidates were living except King and Martin.

== Buck O'Neil Lifetime Achievement Award ==
Another Hall of Fame honor, the Buck O'Neil Lifetime Achievement Award, was also presented at the 2017 Awards Presentation. The award was created in 2008 in honor of Buck O'Neil, a Negro leagues star who went on to become one of baseball's leading ambassadors until his death in 2006. The first award was presented posthumously to O'Neil at the 2008 induction ceremony, and prior to 2017 had been presented two additional times. According to the Hall,

The Buck O'Neil Lifetime Achievement Award is presented by the Hall of Fame's Board of Directors not more than once every three years to honor an individual whose extraordinary efforts enhanced baseball's positive impact on society, broadened the game's appeal, and whose character, integrity and dignity are comparable to the qualities exhibited by O'Neil.

As with the media awards, recipients are not members of the Hall of Fame but are permanently recognized by the Hall. In this case, the recipients are listed alongside a life-size statue of O'Neil that stands at the entrance to the museum. Written nominations for the award are accepted by mail at any time; the nomination must specifically state how the nominee meets the traits exemplified by O'Neil.

On May 25, 2017, the Hall announced that Rachel Robinson, widow of Hall of Famer Jackie Robinson, would be the 2017 recipient. Before Jackie's passing in 1972, the couple established the Jackie Robinson Development Corporation, which builds and manages affordable housing. The following year, she established the Jackie Robinson Foundation to provide college scholarships and leadership training. In announcing the award, Hall of Fame chair Jane Forbes Clark said, "Rachel Robinson has worked tirelessly to raise the level of equality not only in baseball, but throughout society."
