= Ivanushka =

Ivanushka is a hypocoristic for the given name Ivan. It is commonly used in Russian fairy tales. Notable characters with the name include:

- Ivanushka-durachok, or Ivan the Fool, the protagonist in:
  - How Ivanushka the Fool Travelled in Search of Wonder
- Ivanushka, protagonist in:
  - "Sister Alionushka, Brother Ivanushka", the Russian version of "Brother and Sister"
  - Jack Frost (1964 film)
  - Ivanushka in the Land of Tales, trilogy of books by Sergey Zagraevsky

== Other uses ==
- "Ivanushka", a 2009 demo adapted into "Touch-Tone Telephone" by Lemon Demon in 2016
- "Ivanushka", a song performed in Where Has Love Gone? (film)
- "Ivanushka Durachok", a song on Real Life Hits, an album released in 1985

== See also ==
- Ivanushki International, Russian boy band
- Ivanushkin, surname derived from the name
- Ivan the Fool (disambiguation)
