= Wanja =

Wanja is a given name and surname. Notable people with the name include:

== First name ==
- Barbara Wanja (born 1959), former freestyle swimmer from East Germany then known as Barbara Krause
- Dorothy Wanja Nyingi (born 1974), Kenyan ichthyologist
- Wanja Hlibka, singer with the Don Cossack Choir
- Wanja Lundby-Wedin (born 1952), Swedish trade unionist and politician
- Wanja Michuki, Kenyan businesswoman
- Wanja Ronald Ngah (born 12 September 1991), Cameroonian footballer
- Wanja Mary Sellers (born 1962), American-Italian actress and director

== Surname ==
- Iwa Wanja (1905–1991), Bulgarian actress based in Germany
- Janet Wanja (1984–2024), Kenyan volleyball player
- Lutz Wanja (born 1956), German swimmer
- Mbangi Wanja, Sultan of Bagirmi, central Africa, from 1722 to 1736

== Fictional characters ==
- Wanja, character in Ngũgĩ wa Thiong'o's novel Petals of Blood (1977)

== See also ==
- Torsten and Wanja Söderberg Prize, Nordic design award
- Vanja, a given name
- Vanya (disambiguation)
- Wangarr, a concept in Yolngu culture, also spelt Wanja
