= Ivanushkin =

Ivanushkin, feminine: Ivanushkina is a Russian partonymic surname derived from the given name Ivanushka, a diminutive for Ivan. Notable people with the surname include:

- Aleksei Ivanushkin, Russian footballer
- Yevgeny Ivanushkin, Russian bandy player
