= Esporte Clube Santo André =

Santo André
- Full name: Esporte Clube Santo André
- Nicknames: Ramalhão ("Big Ramalho”, João Ramalho's nickname)
- Founded: 18 September 1967; 59 years ago
- Ground: Estádio Bruno José Daniel
- Capacity: 11,440
- President: Sidney Riquetto
- Head coach: Matheus Costa
- League: Campeonato Paulista Série A2
- 2025: Paulista Série A2, 8th of 16
- Website: www.ecsantoandre.com.br
| Home colors | Away colors |

Esporte Clube Santo André, commonly referred to as simply Santo André, is a Brazilian association football club in Santo André, São Paulo. They currently play in the Campeonato Brasileiro Série D, the fourth tier of Brazilian football, as well as in the Campeonato Paulista A2, The Second tier of São Paulo's premier state league.

Santo André greatest rival is São Caetano, the other team in ABC region. The club's mascot name is Ramalhão ("Big Ramalho") after João Ramalho, the bandeirante who founded the city of Santo André in 1553.

== History ==
Santo André was founded on 18 September 1967, by people that wanted to have a team in their city representing the professional football of the Municipality.

The first Santo André directorship was elected on 4 October 1967, and was composed by the following members: Newton Brandão, the President; Wigand dos Santos, Antonio Ferreira dos Santos and Hildebrando Mota Carneiro, the vice-presidents; Nelson Cerchiari and Durval Daniel, secretaries; Matheus Guimarães Jr. and João Manha, the treasurers.

The first official match of the club took place on April 8, 1968, at Américo Guazzelli stadium in a friendly match against Santos. Pelé did not play, but watched the game and participated in the festivities. Santo André won 2 - 1.

In 1984 Santo André were invited to play in Série A based on their State Championship performance. The team reached the third round (ranked 10th overall), but were not invited to compete the following year as the criteria changed.

In 2003, Santo Andre finished as runners-up to Ituano in Série C and thus were promoted to Série B.

In 2004, Santo André won their first national title when they defeated powerhouse Flamengo in the Copa do Brasil final 4-2 on aggregate, gaining the right to compete in the following year's Copa Libertadores. Their first season in Série B was over before it started as the team was docked 12 points for playing an ineligible player. This meant at the time of the Copa do Brasil success their point tally on the local tournament was negative. The team recovered to comfortably avoid relegation.

In the 2005 Copa Libertadores, the team was eliminated in the group stage, finishing third, but recorded one of the biggest victories in the competition, a 6-0 victory against Venezuelan club Deportivo Táchira.

In 2008 Santo André were runners-up to Corinthians in the Série B and thus earned promotion to Série A. After a hard-fought campaign Santo André were relegated back to Série B on the last day of the season.

The 2010 Paulista State Championship proved to be a highly successful campaign. The team finished second in the table behind Santos after a mid season seven match winning streak put them in a commanding position. In the playoffs Santo André overcame Grêmio Prudente, before facing the all conquering Santos team who had scored nearly 100 goals already in all competitions. The first game ended in a 3–2 victory for Santos despite Santo André having a man sent off. The second match on 2 May 2010, proved to be an epic encounter as Santo André leveled the tie in the first minute, before being pegged back. A thrilling game finally ended 3–2 to Santo André (5–5 on aggregate) and saw three red cards given to Santos, and one to Santo André. Despite hitting the post twice, Santo André could not break down a professional Santos rear guard action. Santos thus won the title due to their superior overall record.

Santo André slipped into free fall and were relegated to Série C in 2010 and almost relegated to the Série D in 2011. Also in 2011, the club was relegated to the Campeonato Paulista 2nd division after a poor campaign had them in last place. In 2012, the team was relegated to Serié D for the first time in history, experiencing two relegations in three years. After being eliminated in the second phase of the Serie D in 2013, Santo André stopped competing in national competitions, because they were noit participating in the top state league, which has qualifiers for the Serie D.

== Honours ==
=== Official tournaments ===
National
| Competitions | Titles | Seasons |
|---|---|---|
| Copa do Brasil | 1 | 2004 |
State
| Competitions | Titles | Seasons |
| Copa Paulista | 2 | 2003, 2014 |
| Campeonato Paulista Série A2 | 5 | 1975, 1981, 2008, 2016, 2019 |

=== Runners-up ===
- Campeonato Brasileiro Série B (1): 2008
- Campeonato Brasileiro Série C (1): 2003
- Campeonato Paulista (1): 2010
- Copa Paulista (1): 2002
- Campeonato Paulista Série A2 (2): 1979, 2001

=== Youth team ===
- Copa São Paulo de Futebol Júnior (1): 2003

== Squad ==
As of 22 July 2020

Note: Flags indicate national team as defined under FIFA eligibility rules; some limited exceptions apply. Players may hold more than one non-FIFA nationality.

| No. | Pos. | Nation | Player |
|---|---|---|---|
| — | GK | BRA | Fabricio Santos |
| — | GK | BRA | Ivan |
| — | GK | BRA | Júlio Silva |
| — | GK | BRA | Luis Augusto |
| — | DF | BRA | Bahia |
| — | DF | BRA | Buiú |
| — | DF | BRA | Héliton |
| — | DF | BRA | Marlon |
| — | DF | BRA | Marquinhos |
| — | DF | BRA | Mendes |
| — | DF | BRA | Pedro Vitor |
| — | DF | BRA | Rodrigo |
| — | DF | BRA | Willian Goiano |
| — | MF | BRA | Danilo |
| — | MF | BRA | Denis |
| — | MF | BRA | Guilherme Garré |

| No. | Pos. | Nation | Player |
|---|---|---|---|
| — | MF | BRA | Gustavo |
| — | MF | BRA | Jocinei |
| — | MF | BRA | Nando Carandina (captain) |
| — | MF | BRA | Paulo Vinícius |
| — | MF | BRA | Rodrigo Yuri |
| — | MF | BRA | Rondinelly |
| — | MF | BRA | Ruan |
| — | MF | BRA | Vinicius |
| — | MF | BRA | Vitinho |
| — | MF | BRA | Vitinho Schimith |
| — | FW | BRA | Branquinho |
| — | FW | BRA | Dioran |
| — | FW | BRA | Fernandinho |
| — | FW | BRA | Rafhael Lucas |
| — | FW | BRA | Ramon |
| — | FW | BRA | Vitor Carvalho |
| — | FW | BRA | Wanderley |
| — | MF | BRA | Carlos Jatobá (on loan from Sporting CP) |

=== Out on loan ===
Note: Flags indicate national team as defined under FIFA eligibility rules; some limited exceptions apply. Players may hold more than one non-FIFA nationality.

| No. | Pos. | Nation | Player |
|---|---|---|---|
| — | DF | BRA | Eliandro (to EC São Bernardo) |
| — | MF | BRA | Jhonson (to EC São Bernardo) |

| No. | Pos. | Nation | Player |
|---|---|---|---|
| — | MF | BRA | Pereira (to Costa Rica-MS) |
| — | FW | BRA | Matheus Santiago (to Portuguesa Santista) |

== Former coaches ==
- Callum Paul Hayman (2014)
- A notable coach would be Sérgio Guedes.

== Stadium ==
Santo André's stadium is Estádio Bruno José Daniel, inaugurated in 1969, with a maximum capacity of 18,000 people.

== 2004 Copa do Brasil ==
| Home | Score | Away |
|---|---|---|
First Phase
| Novo Horizonte (GO) | 0–5 | Santo André |
Second Phase
| Santo André | 3–0 | Atlético Mineiro |
| Atlético Mineiro | 2–0 | Santo André |
Third Phase
| Guarani | 1–1 | Santo André |
| Santo André | 0–0 | Guarani |
Quarterfinals
| Santo André | 3–3 | Palmeiras |
| Palmeiras | 4–4 | Santo André |
Semifinals
| Santo André | 3–4 | 15 de Novembro |
| 15 de Novembro | 1–3 | Santo André |
Final
| Santo André | 2–2 | Flamengo |
| Flamengo | 0–2 | Santo André |
