= Vanya =

Vanya (Cyrillic: Ваня) is a Slavic unisex given name, hypocorism of the given names Ivan and Ivana, found in Russia and elsewhere. It is also found as a female given name in Bulgaria.

Notable people with the name include:

== People ==
=== Given name ===
- Vanya Cullen, winemaker
- Vanya Dermendzhieva (born 1958), Bulgarian former basketball player
- Vanya Dmitrienko (born 2005), Russian singer
- Vanya Gospodinova (born 1958), retired Bulgarian middle-distance runner
- Vanya Kewley (1937–2012), British journalist, documentary maker, and nurse
- Vanya Marinova (born 1950), retired Bulgarian gymnast
- Vanya Milanova (born 1954), violinist and recording artist
- Vanya Mirzoyan (born 1948), Armenian scientist-mathematician
- Vanya Mishra (born 1992), Indian actress, engineer, entrepreneur, and beauty pageant titleholder
- Vanya Petkova (1944–2009), Bulgarian poet and writer
- Vanya Shivashankar, competitive speller
- Vanya Shtereva (born 1970), Bulgarian singer and writer
- Vanya Sokolova (born 1971), former Bulgarian volleyball playernational team
- Vanya Voynova (1934–1993), Bulgarian basketball player

=== Surname ===
- Mária Vanya, Hungarian handballer

== Art and entertainment ==
- Uncle Vanya, a 1897 tragicomedy by the Russian playwright Anton Chekhov
- The Vanyar are a kindred of elves in the fiction of J. R. R. Tolkien. The singular form of "Vanyar" is "Vanya".
- Vanya/Viktor Hargreeves in The Umbrella Academy comic book by Gerard Way
- Vanya Schmidt, the main character in the YA Little Thieves book series by Margaret Owens
- Vanya and Sonia and Masha and Spike, a 2012 comedy play written by Christopher Durang

== Other uses ==
- The codename for the Tsar Bomba, a powerful nuclear weapon
- Vanya-class minesweeper, minesweepers built for the Soviet Navy between 1960 and 1973

== See also ==
- Vanja
- Wanja
