= Claire Smith (sportswriter) =

American sportswriter (born 1954)

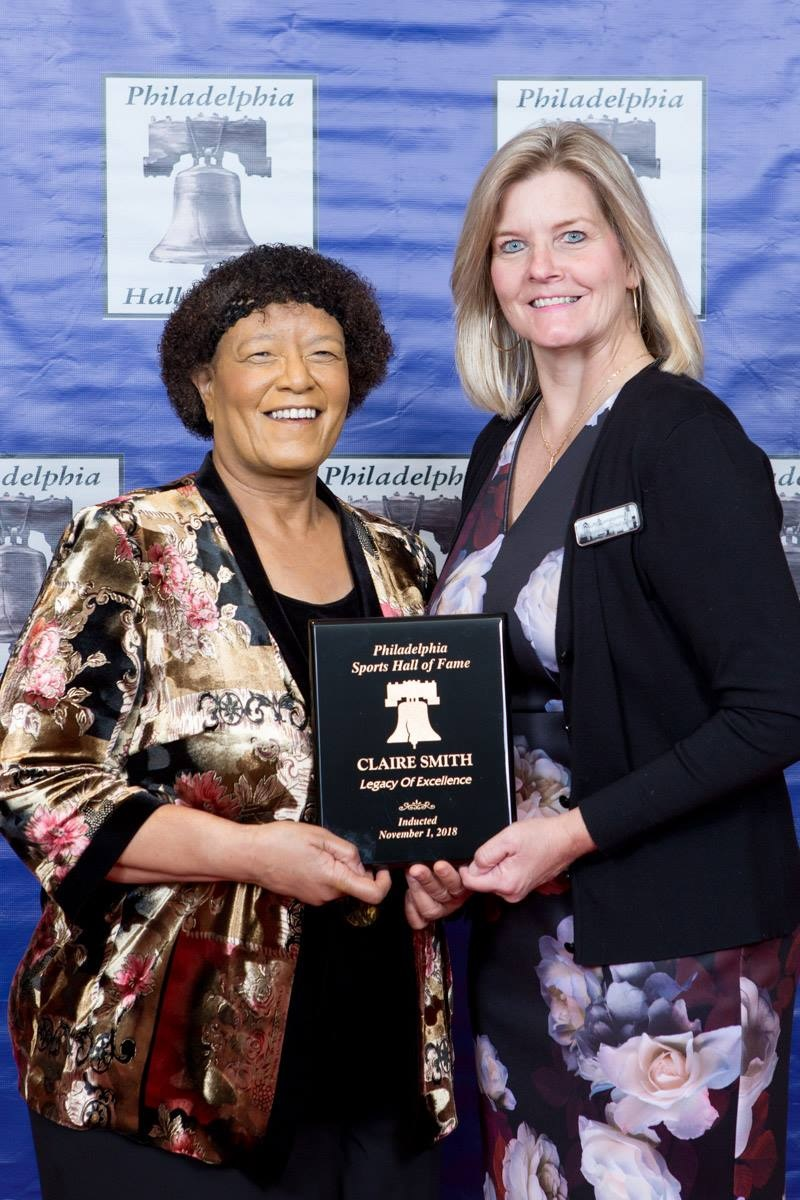
- Smith (left)
- Born: July 1, 1954 (age 72); Langhorne, Pennsylvania, U.S.
- Education: Pennsylvania State University; Temple University
- Occupation: Sportswriter
- Writing career
- Notable awards: J. G. Taylor Spink Award (2017)

Claire Smith (born July 1, 1954) is an American sportswriter, who covered Major League Baseball for the Hartford Courant, The New York Times, and The Philadelphia Inquirer. She is currently a news editor for ESPN. Smith was the first woman to be honored with the J. G. Taylor Spink Award by the Baseball Writers' Association of America.

== Early life ==
Smith was born in Langhorne, Pennsylvania, and graduated from Neshaminy High School. Her mother, Bernice, was a chemist who worked for General Electric; Bernice was born in New York City but was raised in her family's home country of Jamaica. Smith's father, William, was an illustrator and sculptor; she credits him for sparking an interest in baseball, especially for Jackie Robinson and the Dodgers, even though William was a New York Giants fan. She has an older brother, William Jr., born on the day Bobby Thomson hit the famous walk-off home run to win the pennant against the Brooklyn Dodgers.

Smith attended the Pennsylvania State University and then Temple University, getting her first journalism job with the Bucks County Courier Times.

== Career ==
Smith covered the New York Yankees from 1983 to 1987 as the first female Major League Baseball beat writer, working for the Hartford Courant. She later worked as a columnist for The New York Times from 1991 to 1998, and was an editor and columnist for The Philadelphia Inquirer from 1998 to 2007.

External videos
- This baseball writer is in a league of her own, PBS NewsHour

After the first game of the 1984 National League Championship Series against the Chicago Cubs in Wrigley Field, the San Diego Padres physically removed Smith, then working for the Hartford Courant, from the visitors' clubhouse despite a National League rule requiring equal access to all properly accredited journalists during the playoffs. San Diego first baseman Steve Garvey left the clubhouse, told her she still had a job to do, and proceeded with an interview. Peter Ueberroth, the newly appointed Baseball Commissioner, declared a new rule the next day requiring equal access for all major league locker rooms.

Smith was the 2017 recipient of the J. G. Taylor Spink Award, bestowed annually by the Baseball Writers' Association of America (BBWAA) with recipients honored during ceremonies at the National Baseball Hall of Fame in Cooperstown, New York. Smith was the first woman to receive the Spink Award.

Smith was the subject of A League of Her Own, a short biographical documentary that was screened in 2018 at the Hall of Fame's annual Baseball Film Festival. The film was narrated by Jackie Robinson's daughter Sharon.

== Honors ==
Claire Smith was elected the 2017 recipient of the J. G. Taylor Spink Award in balloting by the Baseball Writers' Association of America (BBWAA) on December 6, 2016. She is the first woman, and fourth African-American, to receive this award, the BBWAA's highest honor, presented annually since 1962 for “meritorious contributions to baseball writing.” The award is permanently celebrated in the "Scribes & Mikemen" exhibit in the Library of the National Baseball Hall of Fame and Museum in Cooperstown, New York.

In 2023, she received the Red Smith Award for "outstanding contributions to sports journalism".

== See also ==
- National Association of Black Journalists Hall of Fame
