= Ivan the Fool (disambiguation) =

Ivan the Fool may refer to:

- Ivan the Fool, a character from Russian folk fairy tales
- "Ivan the Fool" (story), an 1886 short story by Leo Tolstoy
- Ivan the Fool (opera), a 1913 opera by César Cui

== See also ==
- Ivanushka
