= Vânia =

Vânia or Vania is a unisex given name of Italian, Spanish and Portuguese origins, derived from the Slavic name "Wanja". Notable people with the name include:

- Vânia Abreu (born 1967), singer and performer from Brazil
- Vânia Bastos (born 1956), Brazilian singer
- Vânia Fernandes (born 1985), Portuguese singer
- Vânia Ishii (born 1973), judoka from Brazil
- Vania King (born 1989), tennis player from the United States
- Anna Vania Mello (born 1979), volleyball player from Italy
- Vania Rossi (born 1983), professional cyclocross bicycle racer from Italy
- Vânia Silva (born 1980), hammer thrower from Portugal
- Vania Stambolova (born 1983), Bulgarian athlete
- Vania Vainilla, Spanish drag queen
- Vania Vargas (born 1978), Guatemalan poet, narrator, editor, and journalist
- Vânia (footballer), Brazilian women's footballer, who also represented Equatorial Guinea

== Fictional characters ==
- Vania (Ninjago), character from Ninjago
