= Ivan (footballer, born 1984) =

Brazilian footballer

Personal information
- Full name: Gilsivan Soares da Silva
- Date of birth: 12 December 1984 (age 41)
- Place of birth: Espinosa, Minas Gerais, Brazil
- Height: 1.87 m (6 ft 1 1/2 in)
- Position: Goalkeeper

Senior career*
Years	Team	Apps	(Gls)
2005	Catanduvense		
2006–2007	Lemense		
2008–2009	Costa Rica		
2010	XV de Jaú		
2011	Campo Mourão		
2011	Operário Ferroviário	10	(0)
2011	→ Joinville (loan)	16	(0)
2012–2015	Joinville	103	(0)
2015	Paysandu	5	(0)
2016–2017	Goiás	10	(0)
2018–2019	Chapecoense	0	(0)
2020	Joinville	0	(0)
2020–2021	Santo André	3	(0)
- * Club domestic league appearances and goals as of 13:00, 29 March 2019 (UTC)

Gilsivan Soares da Silva (born 12 December 1984), commonly known as Ivan, is a Brazilian footballer who plays as a goalkeeper.

== Career statistics ==
=== Club ===
As of 29 March 2019.

Club	Season	League			Cup		Continental		Other		Total	
Club	Season	Division	Apps	Goals	Apps	Goals	Apps	Goals	Apps	Goals	Apps	Goals
Operário Ferroviário	2010	Série D	10	0	0	0	–		0	0	10	0
Operário Ferroviário	2011	Série D	0	0	0	0	–		21 (Note: Appearances in the Campeonato Paranaense)	0	21	0
Operário Ferroviário	Total		10	0	0	0	0	0	21	0	31	0
Joinville (loan)	2011	Série C	16	0	0	0	–		0	0	16	0
Joinville	2012	Série B	35	0	0	0	–		19 (Note: Appearances in the Campeonato Catarinense)	0	54	0
Joinville	2013	Série B	33	0	4 (Note: Appearances in the Copa do Brasil)	0	–		15	0	52	0
Joinville	2014	Série B	35	0	1	0	–		16	0	52	0
Joinville	2015	Série A	0	0	0	0	–		2	0	2	0
Joinville	Total		119	0	5	0	0	0	52	0	176	0
Paysandu	2015	Série B	5	0	0	0	–		0	0	5	0
Goiás	2016	Série B	10	0	1	0	–		4 (Note: Appearances in the Campeonato Goiano)	0	15	0
Goiás	2017	Série B	0	0	0	0	–		1	0	1	0
Goiás	Total		10	0	1	0	0	0	5	0	17	0
Chapecoense	2018	Série A	0	0	0	0	0	0	1	0	1	0
Chapecoense	2019	Série A	0	0	0	0	0	0	5	0	5	0
Chapecoense	Total		0	0	0	0	0	0	6	0	6	0
Career total			144	0	6	0	0	0	84	0	234	0

Notes

Títulos

Joinville

1 campeonato brasileiro série C 2011

1copa santa Catarina 2012

1campeonato brasileiro série B 2014
