= Tomislav Pokaz =

Croatian politician

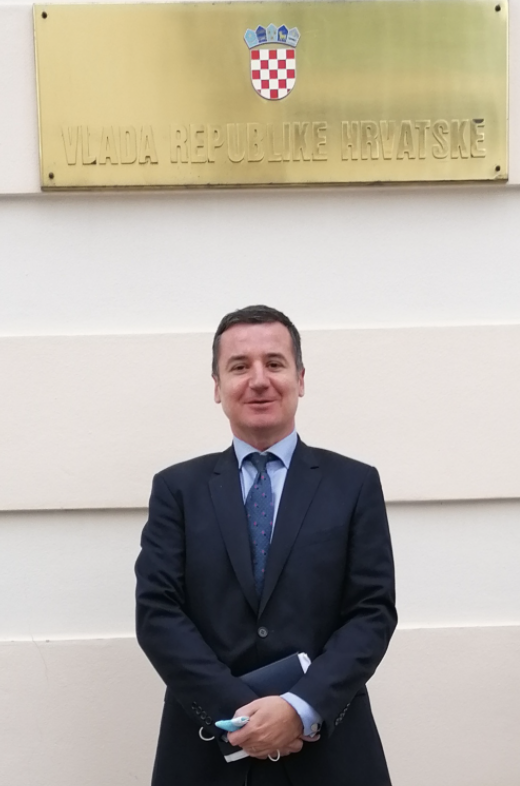

Economic Advisor to the Prime Minister
- Incumbent
- Assumed office 17 November 2016
- Prime Minister: Andrej Plenković

Deputy Chief of Staff of the Prime Minister
- In office 2 February 2016 – 27 October 2016
- Prime Minister: Tihomir Orešković

Personal details
- Born: 25 April 1975 (age 51) Zagreb, Croatia
- Children: 3
- Parent: Ivan Pokaz (father)
- Relatives: Igor Pokaz (brother)
- Education: University of Zagreb

Tomislav Pokaz (born 25 April 1975) is a Croatian official who is currently serving as the economic advisor to Prime Minister Andrej Plenković.

Tomislav Pokaz is the son of retired general Ivan Pokaz. His brother, Igor Pokaz, is a diplomat.

== Career ==
Pokaz began his career of public service in 2002 as senior expert advisor at the Ministry of Defence. He then transitioned to the Trade and Investment Promotion Agency from 2005 until 2011.

Pokaz then worked as the Head of Sector for Industry and Investments at the Ministry of Economy, and also served as President of the supervisory board of Petrokemija - a position which he left when he became Deputy Chief of Staff in the cabinet of Tihomir Orešković. Following the formation of the Cabinet of Andrej Plenković, Pokaz remained in Government as he was appointed the economic advisor to the Prime Minister.

Pokaz is currently serving on the Supervisory Boards of Petrokemija and the Institute of Immunology. He is also involved within the expert committee on the reconstruction of Zagreb following the 2020 earthquake, in the capacity of Deputy President of the committee.
