= Igor Pokaz =

Croatian diplomat (born 1968)

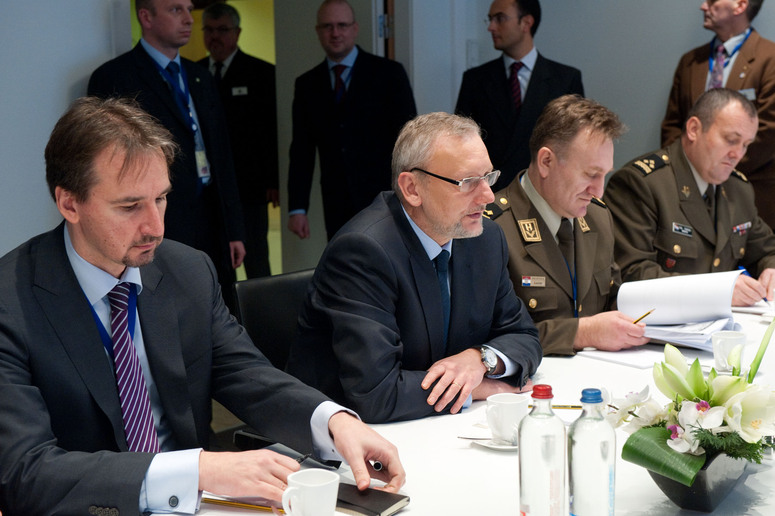
- Igor Pokaz

Ambassador to the United Kingdom
- In office 2017 – 31 May 2023
- Preceded by: Ivan Grdešić
- Succeeded by: Davor Ljubanović (acting)

Ambassador to NATO
- In office 2008–2012
- Preceded by: Davor Božinović
- Succeeded by: Boris Grigić

Ambassador to the Russian Federation
- In office 2012–2015
- Preceded by: Nebojša Koharović
- Succeeded by: Tonči Staničić

Personal details
- Born: May 23, 1968 (age 58) Osijek, Croatia
- Citizenship: Croatia
- Children: 1 child
- Parent: Ivan Pokaz (father)
- Relatives: Tomislav Pokaz (brother)
- Education: The Fletcher School of Law and Diplomacy; Oxford University; University of Zagreb

Military service
- Allegiance: Croatia
- Branch/service: Croatian Army
- Years of service: 1991-1995
- Rank: Lieutenant
- Battles/wars: Croatian War of Independence

Igor Pokaz (born 23 May 1968) is a Croatian diplomat that has served as ambassador to NATO and Russia. He also served as Croatia's ambassador to the United Kingdom between September 2017 and May 2023.

== Education ==
Pokaz has a Bachelor of Economics degree from the University of Zagreb and received his Master's degree in International Relations from the Global Master of Arts Program at The Fletcher School, Tufts University. He also attended Oxford University's Foreign Service Programme from 1998 to 1999.

== Career ==
Igor Pokaz started working in the Ministry of Foreign Affairs in 1994. His first posting abroad was to the Permanent Mission of the Republic of Croatia to the United Nations from 1999 to 2003, in the capacity of diplomatic counsellor. From 2003 to 2007, Pokaz served in the Ministry of Defence, as the Head of Department for International Defense Cooperation and followingly as Under Secretary for Defense Policy. He briefly worked in the private sector, as Head of the Office of CEO Emil Tedeschi at Atlantic Grupa from 2007 to 2008. Pokaz returned to the public sector at the calling of then Prime Minister Ivo Sanader and President Stjepan Mesić, as he was appointed Permanent Representative to NATO. The rationale behind the appointment was the key role Pokaz played in Croatia's accession to NATO, as well as his expertise on defense policy gained during his service at the Ministry of Defence. Pokaz went on to serve as Croatia's ambassador to the Russian Federation from 2012 to 2015, and served as the Ambassador of the Republic of Croatia to the United Kingdom from 2017 until May 2023.

== Personal life ==
Igor Pokaz is the son of retired Croatian general Ivan Pokaz. He is married and has one child.

Pokaz served in the Croatian Armed Forces during the Croatian War of Independence from 1991 to 1995. In 1992, he was promoted to the rank of Lieutenant in the Croatian Armed Forces.
