= Wania =

Wania is both a surname and a given name. Notable people with the name include:

- Dominik Wania (born 1981), Polish pianist and composer
- Wania Monteiro (born 1986), Cape Verdean rhythmic gymnast
