= Ivanka Ninova =

Bulgarian mezzo-soprano opera singer

Ivanka Ninova (Bulgarian: Иванка Нинова) is a Bulgarian mezzo-soprano opera singer born in Vidin.

== Education ==
She began her musical education at a music school and later at the Pancho Vladigerov National Academy of Music in Sofia.

== Career ==
Since 1989 she has been a soloist at the Sofia National Opera. Her roles include Princess Eboli in Don Carlo, Preziosilla in La Forza del Destino, Amneris in Aida, Azucena in Il Trovatore, Fenena in Nabucco, Suzuki in Madame Butterfly, and Carmen. Ninova has given many concert hall performances, including roles in the requiems of Mozart, Verdi, and Dvorak, in Rossini's Stabat Mater, Handel's Messiah, Beethoven's 9th Symphony and many others. More recently she has been a lecturer at the Pancho Vladigerov Music Academy. Though she has performed abroad and throughout Europe, her career has been largely limited to Bulgaria.

== Selected recordings ==
- Rossini: Opera Arias for Mezzo-Soprano and Orchestra. Ivanka Ninova, mezzo-soprano; Orchestra of the Sofia National Opera; conductor: Nayden Todorov. Music Minus One, MMO4077.
- Verdi: Arias for Mezzo-Soprano with Orchestra. Ivanka Ninova, mezzo-soprano; Festival Orchestra of Bulgaria; conductor: Nayden Todorov. Music Minus One, MMO4055.
- Verdi: Messa da Requiem. Daniela Nedialkova, Ivanka Ninova, Roumen Doikov and Emil Ponorski; Choir and Orchestra of the Sofia National Opera; conductor: Ivan Marinov. Brilliant Classics, 2006.
- Mozart: "Voi che sapete", from The Marriage of Figaro. Ivanka Ninova, mezzo-soprano; Sofia Symphony Orchestra; conductor: Dimiter Dimitrov. Included in the compilation Mozart - Highlights aus den großen Opern.
