= Ivan Zaytsev =

Ivan Zaytsev may refer to:

- Ivan Matveyevich Zaitsev (1879-1934), Orenburg Cossack
- Ivan Zaytsev (athlete) (born 1988), Uzbekistani javelin thrower
- Ivan Zaytsev (volleyball) (born 1988), Italian volleyball player
- Ivan Zaytsev (water polo) (born 1975), Russian born Kazakhstani water polo player
