= Ivana Rosić =

Serbian politician

Ivana Rosić (Serbian Cyrillic: Ивана Росић; born 1989) is a politician in Serbia. She has served in the Assembly of Vojvodina since 2020 as a member of the Serbian Progressive Party.

== Private career ==
Rosić is a graduated economist. She lives in Pančevo.

== Politician ==
=== Municipal politics ===
Rosić was given the thirty-ninth position on the Progressive Party's electoral list for Pančevo in the 2016 Serbian local elections and was elected when the list won a majority victory with exactly thirty-nine of seventy mandates. In July 2018, she was appointed as chair of the assembly's council on gender equality. She was promoted to the tenth position on the Progressive list in the 2020 local elections and was re-elected when the list won forty-seven mandates.

=== Assembly of Vojvodina ===
Rosić received the twenty-second position on the Progressive Party's list for the Vojvodina assembly in the 2020 provincial election and was elected when the list won a majority victory with seventy-six of 120 mandates. She is a member of the assembly's gender equality committee and the committee on economy.
