= Iván Rodríguez =

Puerto Rican baseball catcher (born 1971)

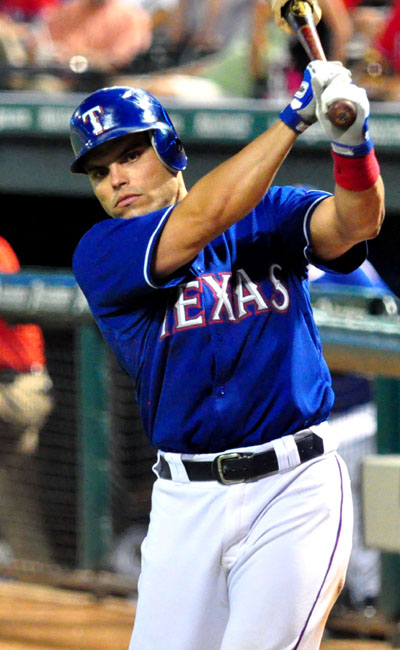
- Rodríguez with the Texas Rangers in 2009
- Catcher
- Born: November 27, 1971 (age 54); Manatí, Puerto Rico
- Batted: Right Threw: Right

MLB debut
- June 20, 1991, for the Texas Rangers

Last MLB appearance
- September 28, 2011, for the Washington Nationals

MLB statistics
- Batting average: .296
- Hits: 2,844
- Home runs: 311
- Runs batted in: 1,332
- Stats at Baseball Reference

Teams
- Texas Rangers (1991–2002); Florida Marlins (2003); Detroit Tigers (2004–2008); New York Yankees (2008); Houston Astros (2009); Texas Rangers (2009); Washington Nationals (2010–2011)

Career highlights and awards
- 14× All-Star (1992–2001, 2004–2007); World Series champion (2003); AL MVP (1999); NLCS MVP (2003); 13× Gold Glove Award (1992–2001, 2004, 2006, 2007); 7× Silver Slugger Award (1994–1999, 2004); Texas Rangers No. 7 retired; Texas Rangers Hall of Fame; Washington Nationals Ring of Honor

Member of the National

Baseball Hall of Fame
- Induction: 2017
- Vote: 76.0% (first ballot)
Shadow Member of the U.S. House of Representatives from Puerto Rico
In office August 15, 2017 – August 20, 2018
Preceded by	Seat established
Succeeded by	Luis Berríos-Amadeo

Iván Rodríguez Torres (born November 27, 1971), nicknamed "Pudge" and "I-Rod", is a Puerto Rican former professional baseball catcher who played 21 seasons in Major League Baseball (MLB). He played for the Texas Rangers (in two separate stints, comprising the majority of his career), Florida Marlins, Detroit Tigers, New York Yankees, Houston Astros and Washington Nationals. Rodríguez is widely regarded as one of the greatest catchers in MLB history and was inducted into the National Baseball Hall of Fame in 2017.

Rodríguez was awarded the American League Most Valuable Player Award in 1999. He won the 2003 World Series with the Florida Marlins and played in the 2006 World Series while with the Tigers. In 2009, he set an MLB record by catching his 2,227th game, passing Carlton Fisk for the most. He had the best career caught-stealing percentage of any major league catcher, at 45.68% (versus a league average of 31%), and he had nine seasons with a caught-stealing rate of 50% or higher. Only one major league catcher (Yadier Molina) has more putouts. Rodríguez recorded 2,844 hits in his career, the most of any catcher in MLB history.

In October 2024, he was inducted into the Michigan Sports Hall of Fame in Detroit. After retiring from baseball, he served as a Shadow Representative from Puerto Rico.

== Early life ==
Rodríguez was born in Manatí, Puerto Rico and raised in Vega Baja, Puerto Rico. His father, José was his baseball coach and his mother, Eva Torres, was an elementary school teacher. Iván's first job involved delivering flyers in the shopping malls in Puerto Rico.

He learned baseball at an early age, his biggest rival being Juan González, whom he often played against in his youth. As a Little League player and just 8 years old, he moved from pitcher and third baseman (his favorite position) to catcher because his father, who was also his coach, thought he was throwing too hard and scaring opposing players with his pitches.

His favorite player growing up was Johnny Bench, even before he was changed to the catcher position. The reason for this was that, according to Rodríguez, the Big Red Machine teams for whom Bench played were constantly on TV in Puerto Rico, and he saw how good Bench was. Rodríguez attended Lino Padron Rivera High School, where he was discovered by scout Luis Rosa. Rosa reported that "He showed leadership at 16 that I'd seen in few kids. He knew where he was going." Rodríguez signed a contract with the Texas Rangers in July 1988, at the age of 16, and began his professional baseball career.

== Professional career ==
=== Minor leagues ===
Rodríguez made his professional debut in 1989 at the age of 17 as catcher for the Gastonia Rangers of the South Atlantic League. In his first game, he went 3-for-3 at the plate against Spartanburg. Playing in the Florida State League in 1990, Rodríguez was selected the best catcher in the league and named to the All-Star team. He placed 15th in the league in batting at .287, and led his team in runs batted in, with 55. He also played in the Liga de Béisbol Profesional Roberto Clemente (LBPRC) over the offseason.

I got my nickname on the very first day of camp. Chino Cadahia, who was a Rangers coach at the time, gave me that name. He saw that I was short and stocky, so, from Day One, he started calling me "Pudge." It caught on, and the rest is history.

— Ivan Rodríguez, in how he got his “Pudge” nickname

At the beginning of the 1991 season, Rodríguez played 50 games with the Tulsa Drillers, a AA team, where he batted .274 in 175 at-bats. He was considered the number one prospect of the Texas League. Before the middle of the season, he was called up to the Texas Rangers, thus bypassing AAA.

=== Texas Rangers (1991–2002) ===
Making his debut with the Texas Rangers on June 20, 1991, he became the youngest player to catch in a major league game that season at 19 years of age. He immediately established himself as an excellent hitter who was also proficient in throwing out would-be base-stealers. He started many of the Rangers games at the end of the season, including 81 of the last 102. Rodríguez became the youngest player in the history of the Texas Rangers to hit a home run, on August 30, 1991, facing the Kansas City Royals and right-hander Storm Davis. He was named to the Major League Baseball (MLB) Rookie All-Star team by both Topps and Baseball America and finished in fourth place in the AL Rookie of the Year voting. He also placed first in throwing out runners, catching 48.6 percent of runners attempting to steal.

In 1992, Rodríguez started 112 games behind the plate and was the youngest player in the major leagues for the second year in a row. Playing in the Puerto Rico Winter League, he had a .262 batting average playing in 17 games for Mayagüez. In the 1993 season, Rodríguez batted .273, had 66 runs batted in and hit 10 home runs, ranking fourth, fifth, and fifth on his team respectively. He had a stretch of eight straight hits over two games facing the Kansas City Royals on July 26 and July 28. He played the final month of the regular season in the Puerto Rican Winter league, where he had a .425 batting average and 14 runs batted in for Mayagüez. Rodríguez was named to the Puerto Rican Winter League all-star team and was also the league Most Valuable Player (MVP). In 1994, Rodríguez led the American League in batting average among catchers, at .298. He placed high on his team in many statistics, placing second in batting average (.298), tied for third in doubles (19), and fourth in hits, total bases, runs, home runs, walks, games, and at bats. He also caught Kenny Rogers' perfect game on July 28. Rodríguez played in the Puerto Rican Winter League over the winter, but he suffered a severe knee injury which kept him from playing for the rest of the season.

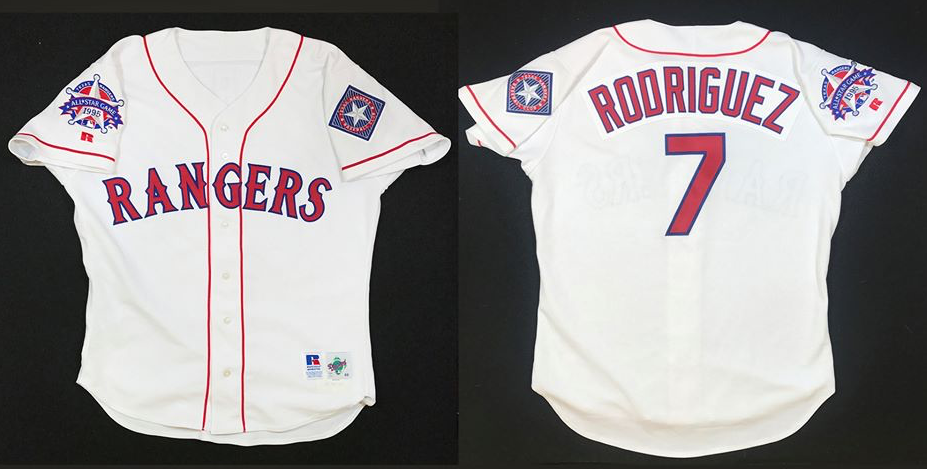
1995 Texas Rangers #7 Ivan Rodriguez home jersey

Playing for the Rangers during the 1995 season, Rodríguez led his team in batting, total bases, and doubles, at .303, 221, and 32 respectively. He was named the Texas Rangers' player of the year. Rodríguez also had his first multi-home run game while playing the Boston Red Sox on July 13, hitting both off All-Star pitcher Roger Clemens. He also played for Caguas in the Puerto Rican Winter League during the offseason.

In 1996, Rodríguez set an MLB record for most doubles by a catcher, amassing 47 over the course of the season. This broke the previous mark of 42, set by Mickey Cochrane in 1930. He also set the major league record for at-bats by a catcher in a single season, with 639, which surpassed Johnny Bench's record of 621 in 1970. He led the Texas Rangers in doubles, at bats, hits, and runs scored. He was selected to the Major League Baseball All-Star team that played a series in Japan against the Japanese all-stars after the season was over. He again played in the Puerto Rican Winter League this season. In the 1997 season, Rodríguez also placed first among catchers in many categories in Major League Baseball. These categories were hits, runs, runs batted in, and doubles. He placed second in home runs among catchers, below only Sandy Alomar Jr. of the Cleveland Indians, who had 20 home runs. He appeared on the cover of Sports Illustrated on the week of August 4. This marked the fourth time a player from the Texas Rangers had been on the cover of Sports Illustrated. Rodríguez played in the Puerto Rican Winter League yet again, where he had a .285 batting average, four home runs, and 18 runs batted in over the course of 32 games playing for Caguas.

In the 1998 season, Rodríguez led the Texas Rangers in batting average at .325, which placed eighth in the American League. He also had 75 multi-hit games and 186 hits, finishing seventh and ninth in MLB respectively. He finished second on the Rangers in hits, total bases, triples, and slugging percentage. Rodríguez was third on the team in doubles, home runs, and stolen bases, and fourth in runs batted in. He recorded his 1,000th career hit in a game facing the Cleveland Indians on May 10 of that season. Rodríguez also became the first catcher in the history of Major League Baseball to have two or more seasons with 40 or more doubles. He was selected to the American League All-Star Team again, and he was also named to all-star teams by The Associated Press, The Sporting News, and Baseball America.

In 1999, Rodríguez was selected as the American League MVP. Rodríguez was also the first catcher to have more than 30 home runs, 100 runs batted in, and 100 runs scored in the history of Major League Baseball. In addition, he holds the distinction of being the first catcher in the history of the league to amass more than 20 home runs and 20 stolen bases. From May 8 to June 1, 1999, Rodríguez had a career-high 20-game hitting streak. He had 25 stolen bases, which was fifth most among catchers in the history of the league. He led the league in times grounded into a double play, with 31. Rodríguez was only the ninth catcher in the history of Major League Baseball to win the Most Valuable Player award, and he was the first to win it since Thurman Munson in 1976. He was named on all of the ballots, getting seven first place votes and six second place votes. Rodríguez was the sixth Puerto Rican to win the award, and the fourth player from the Texas Rangers to win it. He also won the Silver Slugger Award for the sixth time in a row and was selected Most Valuable Player by Baseball Digest. He was again named to all-star teams by the Associated Press, The Sporting News, and Baseball America. While he was hitting home runs, he rarely drew walks. He is one of only six players active in 2009 who have had at least 30 home runs in a season in which they had more homers than walks (34 home runs, 24 walks in 1999). The others are Alfonso Soriano (39–23 in 2002, 36–33 in 2005, 33–31 in 2007), Garret Anderson (35–24 in 2000), Ryan Braun (34–29 in 2007), Joe Crede (30–28 in 2006), and José Guillén (31–24 in 2003).

In 2000, Rodríguez suffered a season-ending injury in a game against the Anaheim Angels. While trying to make a throw to second base, his thumb made contact with the swing of Mo Vaughn's bat. He fractured his right thumb and underwent surgery the next day. This injury caused him to miss the rest of the season. Rodríguez appeared in just 91 games, which was the fewest that he appeared in since his first season in the league, 1991. His nine home runs in April matched a team record that was shared (through 2008) with Alex Rodriguez (2002), Carl Everett (2003), and Ian Kinsler (2007). Even though he was injured, he was still named to the second-team of Baseball America's Major League Baseball All-Star Team.

Rodríguez returned to full action in 2001 and had another all-star season. He was selected to his ninth straight MLB All-Star Game, which tied the all-time record set by Johnny Bench. He also tied Bench's record of ten straight Rawlings Gold Glove Awards in a row. He batted .308, making 2001 his seventh straight season with a batting average of over .300. He had 25 home runs, 136 hits, and 65 RBI. He also posted a career-best 60.3% caught stealing rate, in a year when the league average was 29%.

Rodríguez's final year in his first stint with the Texas Rangers came in 2002. His .314 batting average was seventh best among American League players. This was his eighth season in a row with batting average of .300 or above. He also had 32 doubles, two triples, and 60 runs batted in while playing in 108 games for the Rangers. Rodríguez was placed on the disabled list on April 23 after suffering a herniated disk on April 15. The injury did not require surgery, and he rehabilitated while playing for Class-A Charlotte. He later returned to the Rangers and played there for the remainder of the season. After the 2002 season, his contract with Texas expired and he became a free agent.

=== Florida Marlins (2003) ===
On January 22, 2003, Rodríguez signed a one-year, $10 million contract with the Florida Marlins. By then a major-league veteran of over a decade, he helped lead the young team to victory in the World Series. During the 2003 regular season, he set many Marlins single season records for a catcher, such as batting average, at .297, and runs batted in, at 85. On March 31, Rodríguez became the tenth Marlins player ever to hit a home run in the team's first game of the season. On April 8, he set a Marlins single game record by drawing five walks in a game against the New York Mets.

He had a nine-game hitting streak from June 24 to July 2, during which he batted .500 with seven doubles, two triples, and four home runs. From June 24 to July 1, he drove in a run in eight consecutive games, another single season record for the Marlins. In the postseason, he was named National League Championship Series Most Valuable Player for the first time in his career. He also closed out the National League Division Series by holding onto the ball during a dramatic game-ending collision at the plate with J. T. Snow in Game 4. He chose not to return to the Marlins following the 2003 season.

=== Detroit Tigers (2004–2008) ===
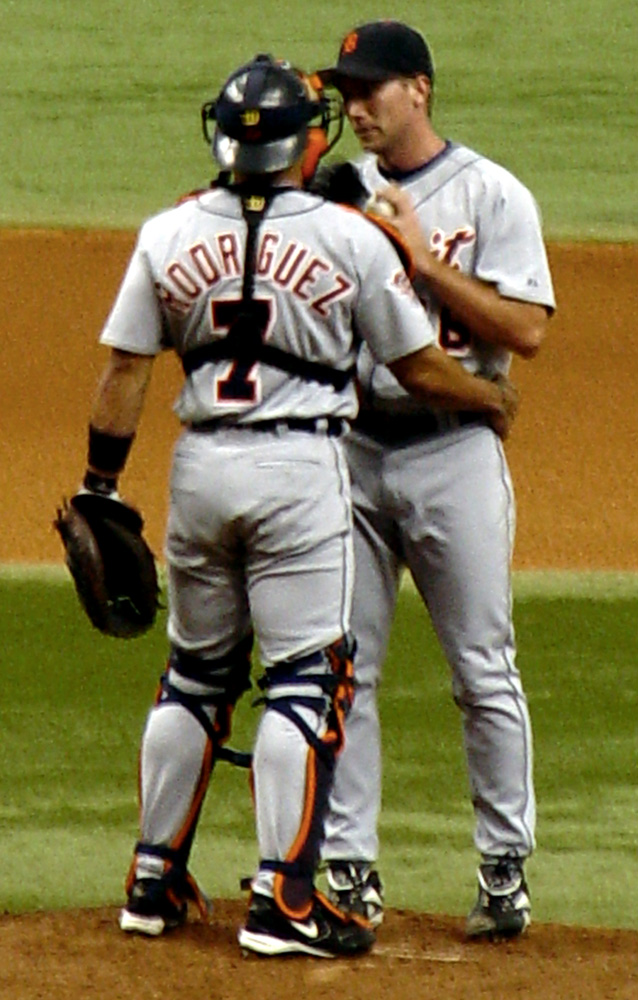
Rodríguez talking with Mike Maroth while playing for the Detroit Tigers, July 11, 2005.

Before the 2004 season, Rodríguez signed a four-year, $40 million contract with the Detroit Tigers. In 2004, he was selected to the MLB All-Star Game for the 11th time in his career and for his 10th time as a starting player, joining Johnny Bench and Mike Piazza as the only Major League Baseball catchers to start an All-Star game 10 times or more in their career. During the month of June, he batted .500 and was named the American League Player of the Month. He also won his 10th consecutive Rawlings Gold Glove Award, making him the first player on the Detroit Tigers to win the award since Gary Pettis won it in 1989. He won his seventh career Silver Slugger Award, tied with Víctor Martínez of the Cleveland Indians. He was fourth in the American League in batting average and fourth among all Major League Baseball catchers. On October 1, he recorded his 1,000th career RBI in a game against the Tampa Bay Devil Rays.

Prior to the 2005 season, Jose Canseco, in his controversial book Juiced, claimed to have personally injected Rodríguez with anabolic steroids during their time as teammates on the Texas Rangers. Rodríguez denied the allegations and said he was "in shock" over Canseco's claims. Rodríguez arrived at spring training in 2005 weighing 193 lbs.; his 2004 playing weight had been 215 lbs. Given that Major League Baseball implemented a more stringent regime of testing for performance-enhancing drugs in 2005, the "significant weight loss" experienced by Rodríguez "raised more than a few eyebrows". Rodríguez asserted that his weight loss was the result of changes in his diet and exercise. Asked by a reporter in 2009 whether his name was on the list of 104 players who tested positive for steroids during baseball's 2003 survey testing, Rodríguez responded, "Only God knows."

Despite the off-season controversy, the 2005 season turned out to be another All-Star year for Rodríguez. He was selected to the Major League Baseball All-Star Game for the 12th time in his career, and he participated in the Century 21 Home Run Derby on the day before the All-Star game, finishing second to Bobby Abreu of the Philadelphia Phillies in his home stadium of Comerica Park. For the season, he batted .276 with 14 home runs and 50 runs batted in. On October 26, 2005, Major League Baseball named him the catcher on their Latino Legends Team.

In 2006, Rodríguez returned to throwing out runners attempting to steal a base at a very high percentage, as he did in his earlier career; he was first in the league in this category, throwing out 45.7 percent of all runners attempting to steal a base. On May 9, 2006, Rodríguez played first base for the Tigers. That game, a 7–6 loss to the Baltimore Orioles, was the first time that he played a position other than catcher in his 1,914 Major League games. On August 15, 2006, he also made his first Major League appearance at second base after regular second baseman Plácido Polanco was injured in a game in Boston. Rodríguez was honored with a Fielding Bible Award as the best fielding catcher in MLB in 2006. Rodríguez would help the Tigers upset the Yankees in the 2006 ALDS and the A's in the 2006 ALCS to help Detroit win the pennant.

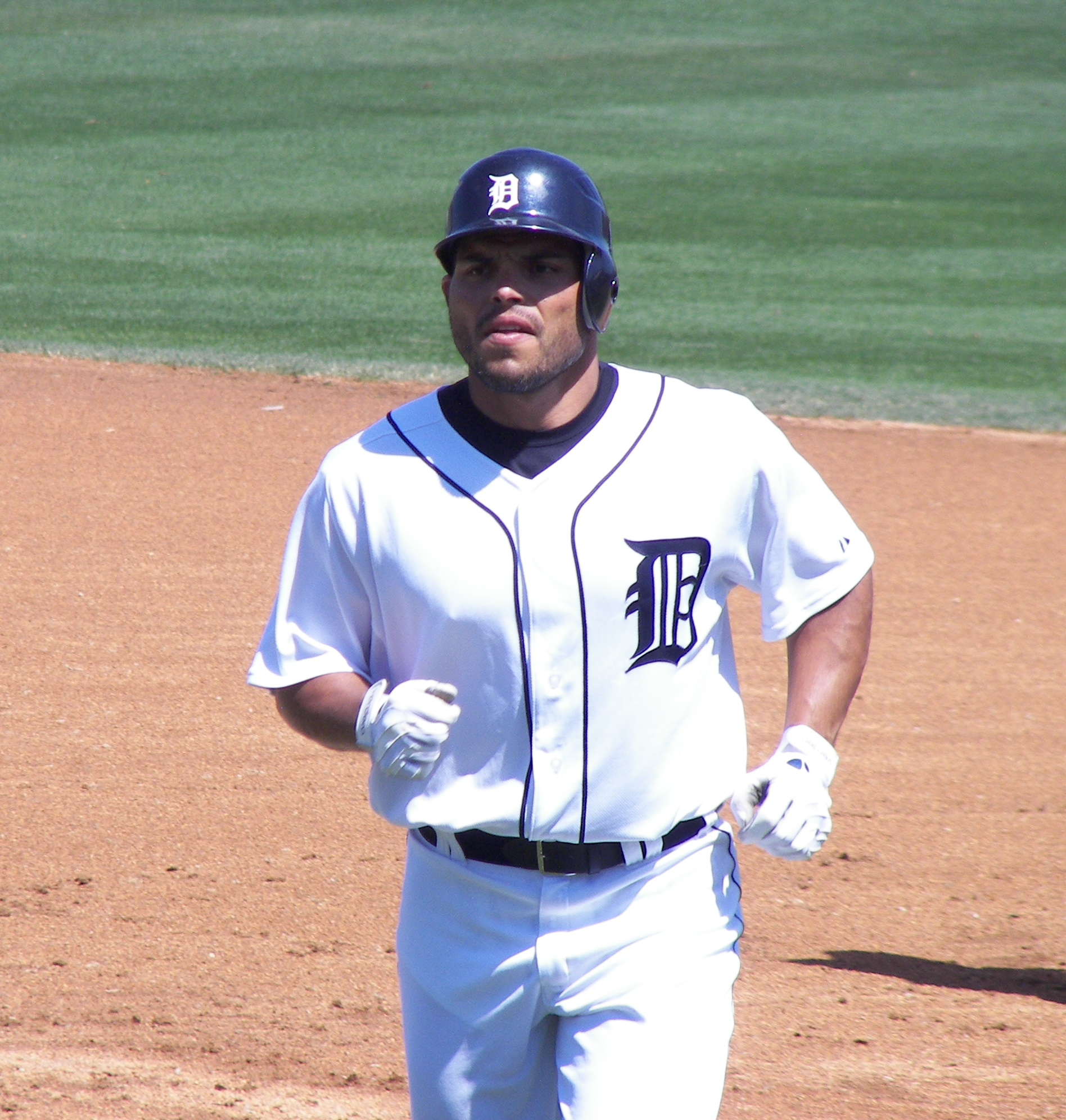
Rodríguez as a Tiger in 2007

On April 16, 2007, he batted in six runs on the way to a 12–5 victory over the Kansas City Royals. On June 12 he caught Justin Verlander's first no-hitter, the second no-hitter he caught in his career. In 2007, Rodríguez walked in only 1.8 percent of his plate appearances, the lowest percentage in the major leagues. On October 9, the Tigers announced that they were picking up the fifth-year, $13 million option on Rodríguez's contract, keeping him on the Tigers team through at least the 2008 season. The team could have bought out the option for $3 million and allowed him to become a free agent.

In spring training in 2008 he led the major leagues with eight home runs. On April 10 against Boston, he got his 2,500th hit.

=== New York Yankees (2008) ===
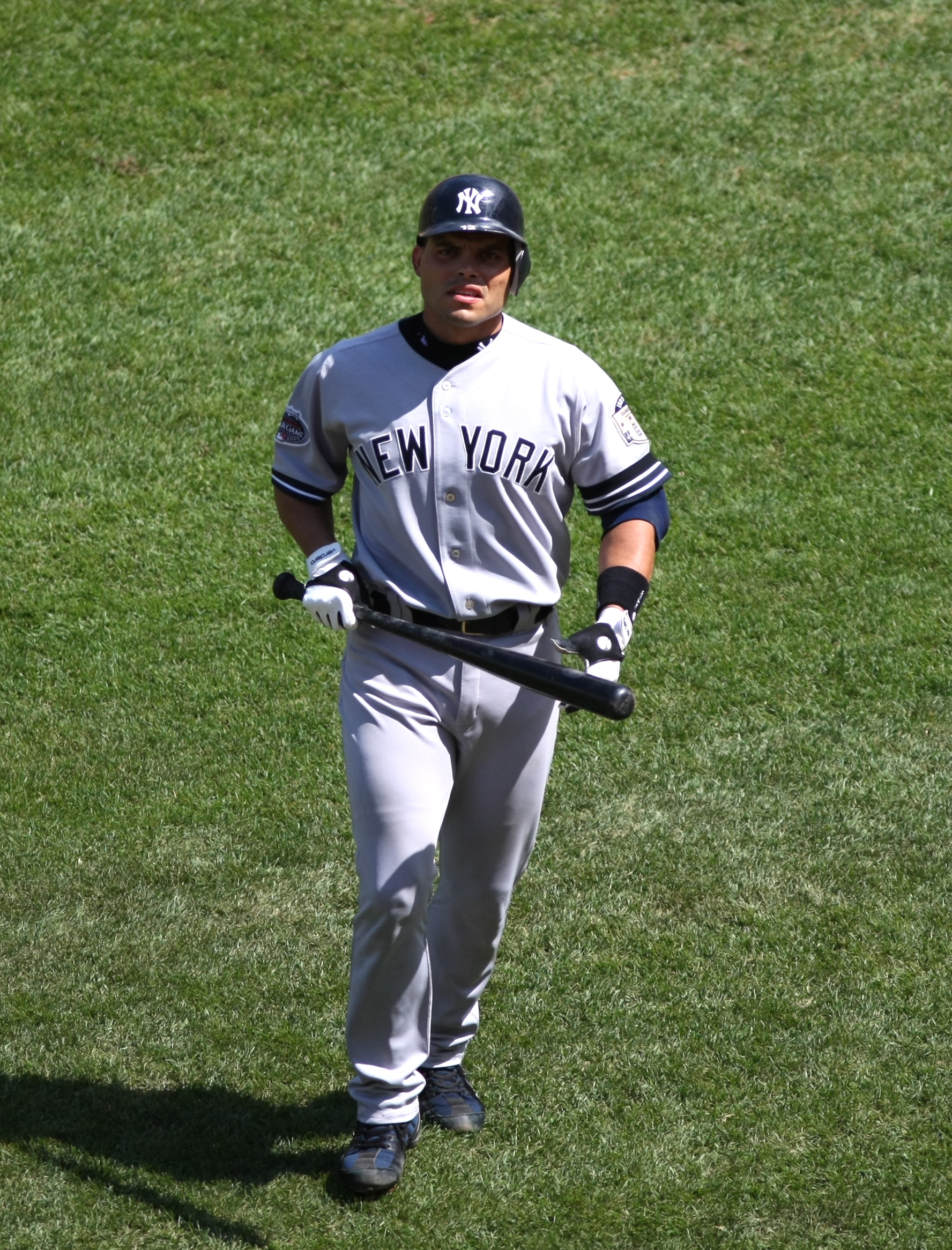
Rodríguez with the New York Yankees in 2008.

On July 30, 2008, Rodríguez was traded to the New York Yankees for relief pitcher Kyle Farnsworth after starting Yankee catcher Jorge Posada had season-ending surgery. While Rodríguez wanted to leave Detroit due to Tigers manager Jim Leyland's decision to use rotating catchers, he wound up sharing catching duties with back-up Yankee catcher José Molina, starting only 26 of the remaining 55 games of the 2008 season. With his customary number 7 having been retired by the Yankees for Mickey Mantle, Rodríguez changed his jersey number to 12. He finished the year with a .278 batting average with his time on the Yankees being his worst part of the season.

=== Return to Puerto Rican League ===
In preparation for the 2009 World Baseball Classic, Rodríguez returned to the Puerto Rico Baseball League (formerly LBPPR) during the offseason, following ten years of absence. Playing for the Criollos de Caguas, he gathered a batting average of .370 with three runs batted in and one home run in six games during the regular season. Upon leaving the team on vacation, Rodríguez noted that his intention was to return to action if the Criollos advanced to the playoffs. He returned to action in a "sudden death" game for the final postseason space, but the team lost and was eliminated. On January 8, 2008, the Leones de Ponce reclaimed Rodríguez in the last turn of a special post-season draft, where players from eliminated teams were selected to reinforce those that qualified. In the first week of December 2009, Rodríguez re-joined the Criollos de Caguas in the PRBL.

=== Houston Astros (2009) ===
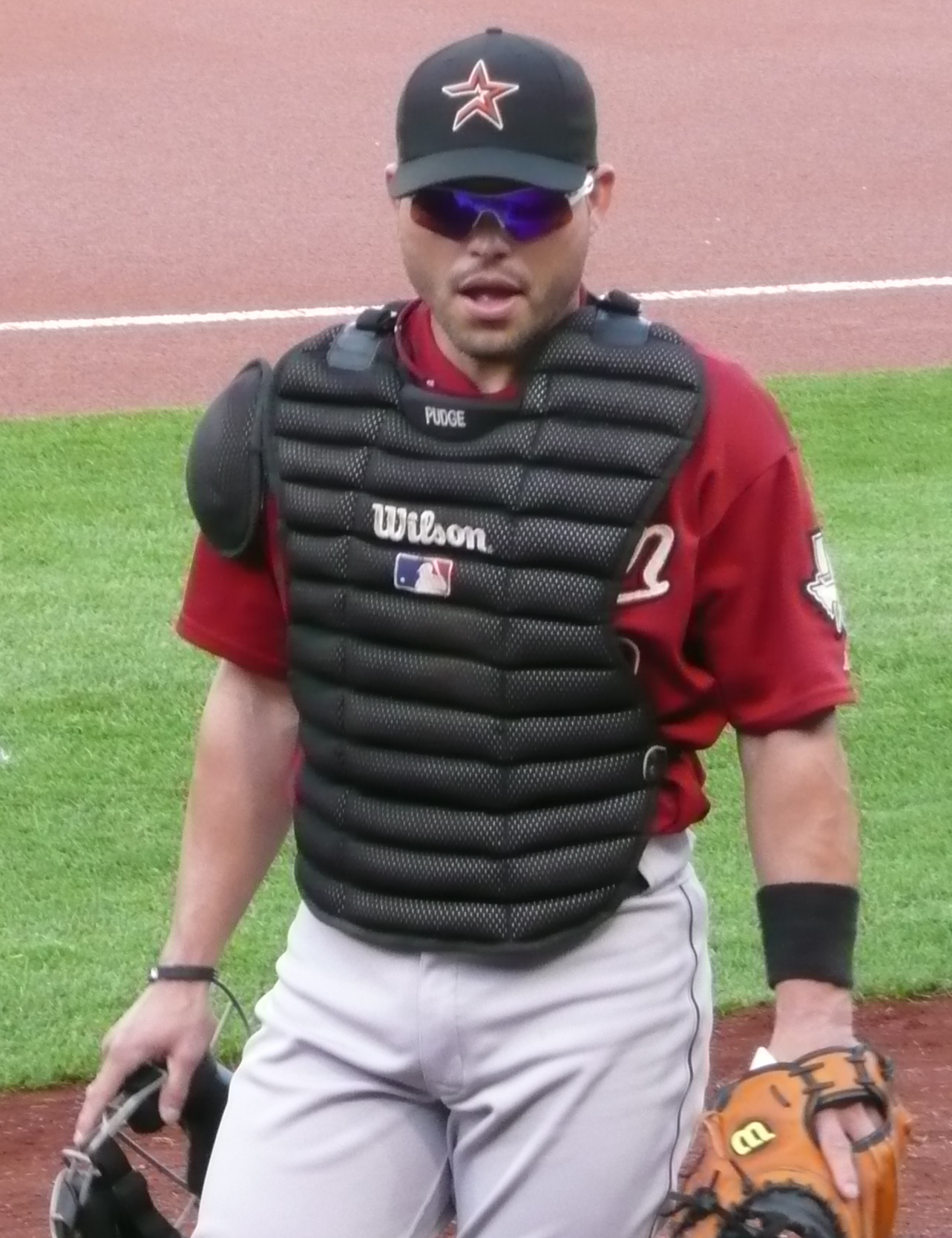
Rodríguez during his tenure with the Houston Astros in 2009.

On March 20, 2009, Rodríguez signed a one-year deal worth $1.5 million with the Houston Astros. Rodríguez was given the opportunity to make an additional $1.5 million in performance bonuses. In a situation similar to his tenure with the Yankees, his customary number 7 had been retired by the Astros in honor of Craig Biggio, so Rodríguez initially wore jersey number 12, then later changed to number 77 mid-season.

On May 17, 2009, Rodríguez hit his 300th career home run off of Chicago Cubs pitcher Rich Harden at Wrigley Field. On June 17, 2009, Rodríguez caught his 2,227th career game, passing Carlton Fisk for the most games caught in a career; the game was against his former team (the Rangers) at Rangers Ballpark in Arlington.

=== Second stint with Rangers (2009) ===
On August 18, 2009, Rodríguez was traded to the Texas Rangers for minor league reliever Matt Nevarez and two PTBNL. Teammate David Murphy switched his uniform number to #14 so Rodríguez could wear the #7 he previously wore with the Rangers. In his first game back with the Rangers, Rodríguez went 3-for-4 with an RBI double and two singles. He hit his first home run with the Rangers since 2002 on August 29, a solo shot against Minnesota Twins reliever José Mijares.

He finished the 2009 season ranked first in major league history with 13,910 putouts as a catcher, ahead of Brad Ausmus (12,671).

=== Washington Nationals (2010–2011) ===
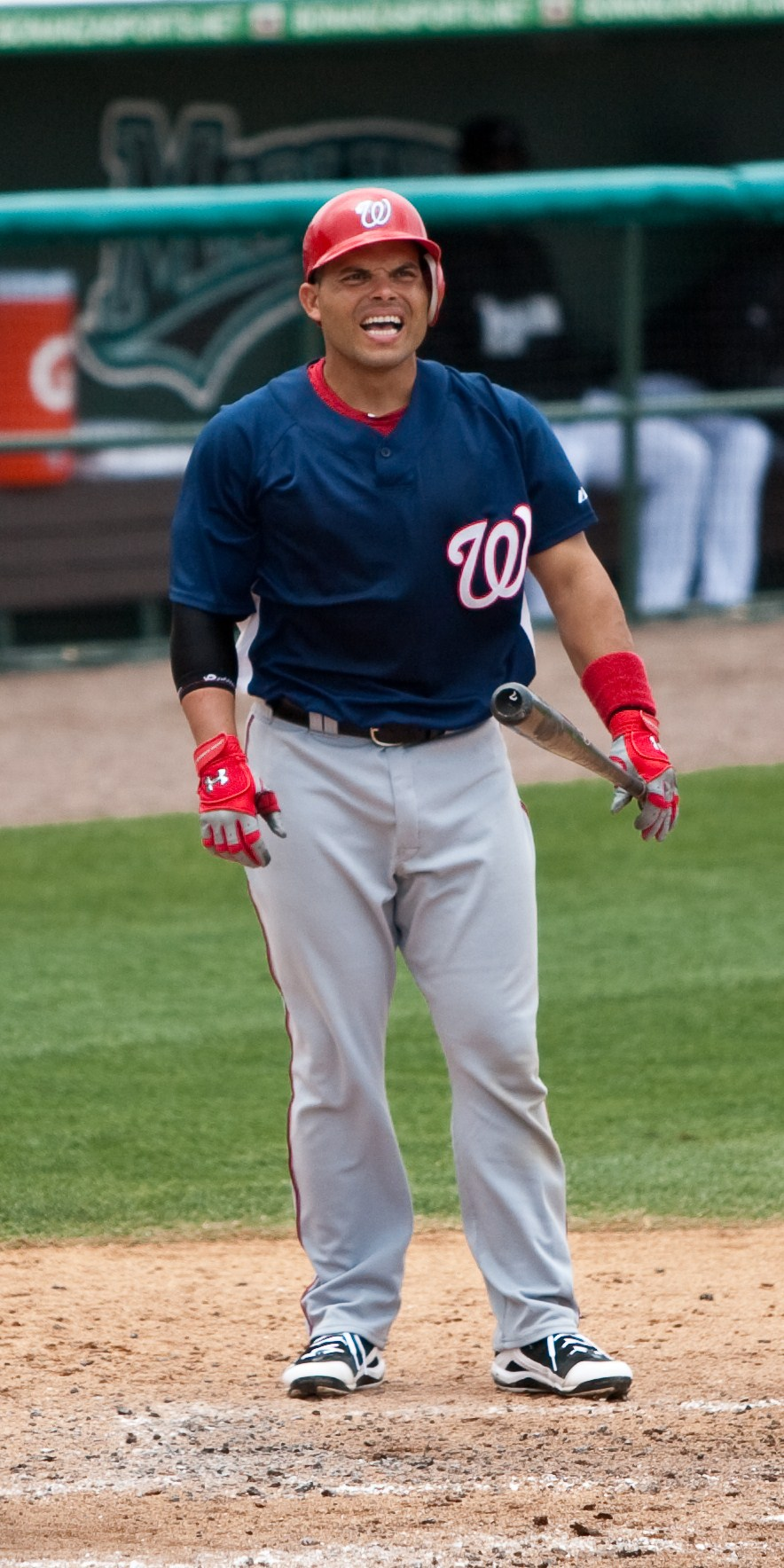
Rodríguez during batting practice while with the Nationals.

Following the 2009 season, Rodríguez filed for free agency, declining the Rangers' offer of salary arbitration. On December 11, 2009, Rodríguez signed a two-year, $6 million contract with the Washington Nationals.

Rodríguez hit his first home run as a member of the Nationals on May 6 against Tim Hudson of the Atlanta Braves. Facing the New York Mets at Citi Field four days later, he went 4-for-4 and drove in the eventual game-winning RBI. On May 24, Rodríguez was hitting .325, but was placed on the 15-day disabled list due to a back sprain. Rodríguez returned from the DL in time to catch for Stephen Strasburg's Major League debut on June 8, 2010. Nationals pitching coach Steve McCatty instructed Strasburg to throw whatever Rodriguez called, which he did the entire game, except for the first pitch. Strasburg struck out 14 batters and walked none over seven complete innings, which has been described as one of the greatest major league pitching debuts of all time. In a postgame interview, Pudge reacted that "[e]verybody [was] impressed with what this kid did." In 2011, Rodríguez platooned at catcher for the Nationals with Wilson Ramos. Nationals GM Mike Rizzo later said signing Rodriguez to the team "turned out to be one of the best things we’ve done. He taught us to be a professional franchise."

=== Career statistics ===
In 2,543 games over 21 seasons, Rodríguez posted a .296 batting average (2,844-for-9,592) with 1,354 runs, 572 doubles, 51 triples, 311 home runs, 1,332 RBI, 127 stolen bases, 513 bases on balls, .334 on-base percentage and .464 slugging percentage. Defensively, he recorded a .991 fielding percentage. In 40 postseason games, he hit .255 (39-for-153) with 17 runs, 9 doubles, 4 home runs, 25 RBI and 14 walks.

== International career ==
=== World Baseball Classic (Puerto Rico) ===
Rodríguez represented Puerto Rico in the 2006 World Baseball Classic. Rodríguez was one of several Major League Baseball players that committed to represent their birthplaces before the organization of the tournament. He also played for Puerto Rico in the 2009 World Baseball Classic and was named to the classic's All-World Baseball Classic team.

== Retirement and honors ==
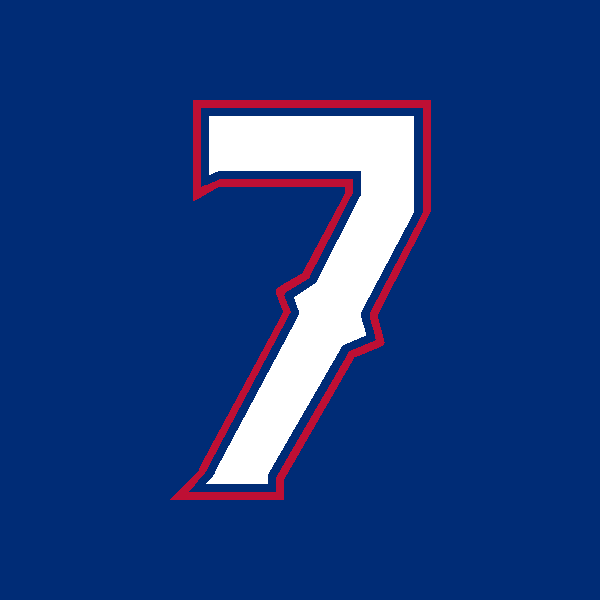
Iván Rodríguez's number 7 was retired by the Texas Rangers in 2017.

Rodríguez announced his retirement on April 18, 2012. He signed a one-day contract with the Rangers on April 23, retiring as a member of the team. Rodríguez also threw out the ceremonial first pitch during the Rangers home game against the New York Yankees. Instead of throwing out the ceremonial first pitch from the mound, he went to his usual position behind the plate and threw from behind home plate to second base to Michael Young. Rodríguez was inducted into the Texas Sports Hall of Fame on February 27, 2014. He also joined FOX Sports Southwest in 2014 as an analyst for pre and postgame television coverage. He joined the Rangers front office as a special assistant to the general manager in February 2013 and continues in that role as of the 2024 season.

In 2017, Rodríguez became eligible for induction into the Baseball Hall of Fame. Richard Justice of MLB.com argued that he was "unquestionably" a Hall of Fame-caliber player, writing on MLB.com in 2012 that he batted better than .290 with more than 2,500 hits, 550 doubles, 300 home runs and 1,300 RBI, an accomplishment equaled only by five all-time greats: Stan Musial, Hank Aaron, George Brett, Babe Ruth and Barry Bonds. Justice acknowledged that like Bonds, Rodríguez may have difficulty winning election to the Hall of Fame due to suspicion that he used steroids during his career, USA Today expressed similar sentiments. On January 18, 2017, Rodríguez was elected to the Hall of Fame on his first ballot, receiving 76% of the vote. He became the first former Washington Nationals player in the Hall of Fame.

Rodríguez was inducted into the Hall of Fame in Cooperstown on July 30, 2017. On August 12, 2017, the Rangers retired his jersey #7 with the team (and the opponent, Houston Astros) wearing throwback jerseys to the 1999 era in which Rodriguez played.

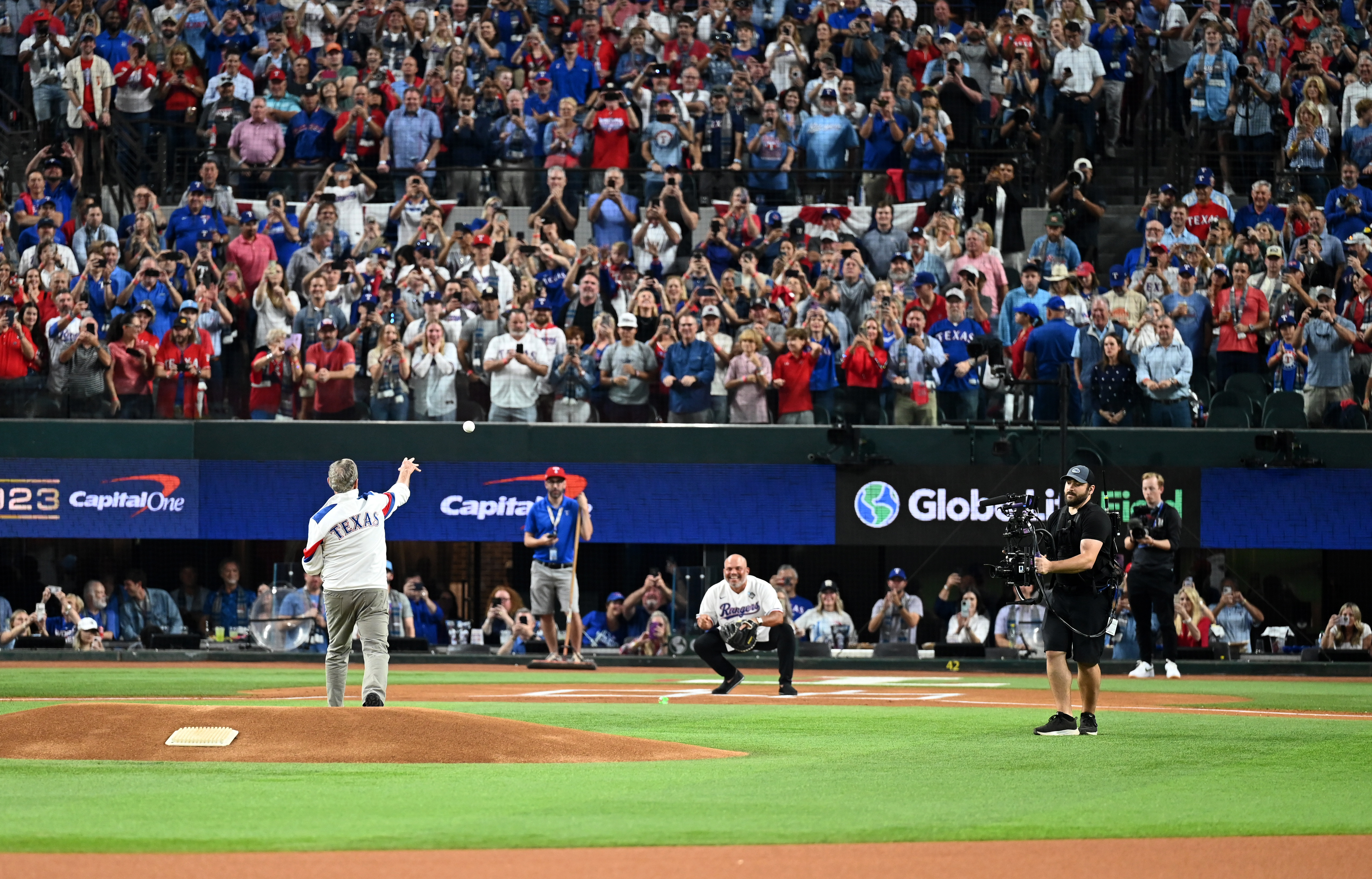
George W. Bush throwing a ceremonial first pitch to Rodríguez prior to Game 1 of the 2023 World Series

In August 2017, Rodríguez was selected by then-Governor Ricardo Rosselló as one of Puerto Rico's five shadow representatives. Before the start of Game 1 of the 2023 World Series, Former President of the United States George W. Bush threw the ceremonial first pitch to Rodríguez.

== Personal life ==
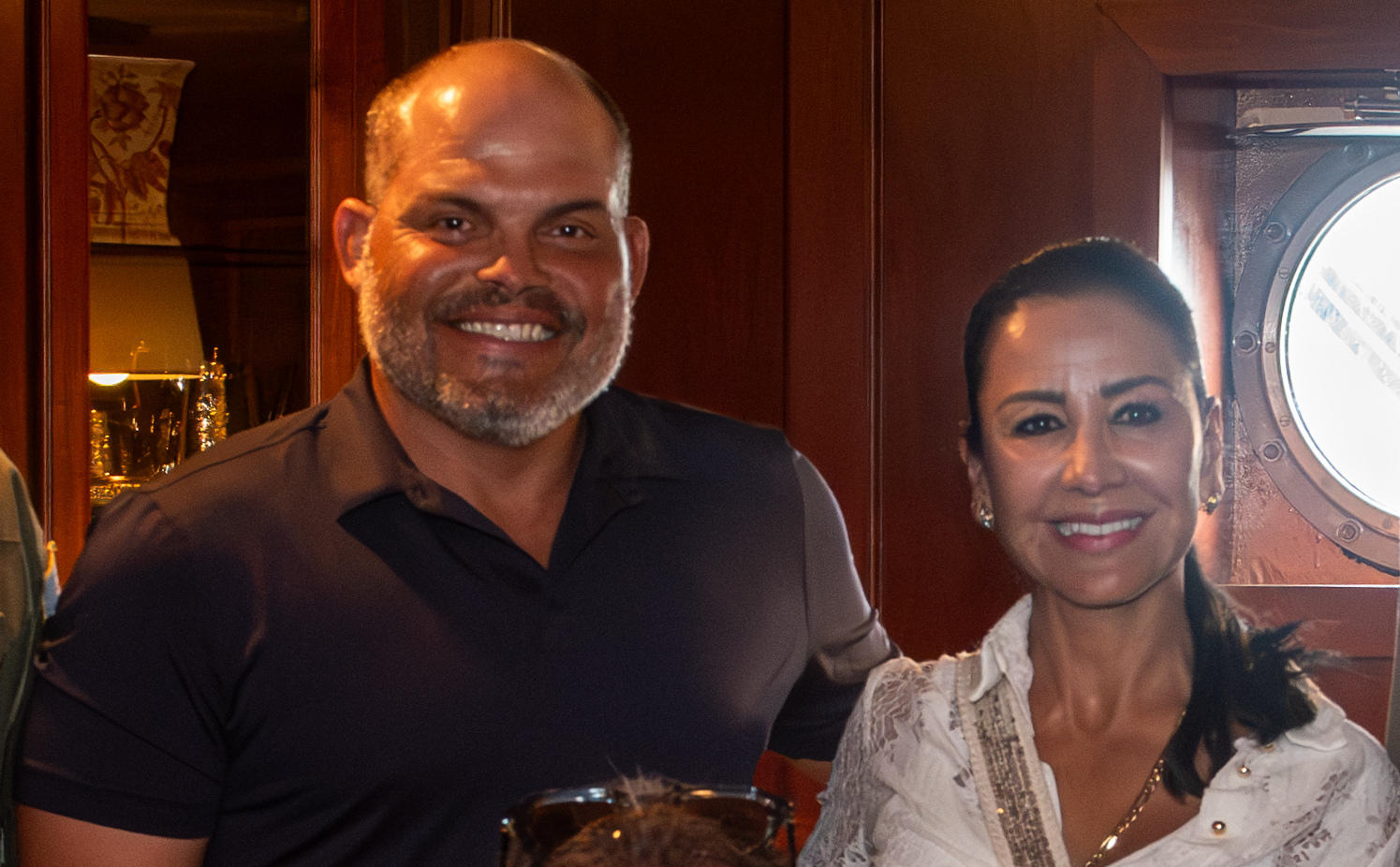
Rodríguez and his wife, Patricia, in 2023

Rodríguez married Maribel Rivera on June 20, 1991. That same night, having been called up from double A (Rodriguez bypassed AAA) by the Texas Rangers, Rodríguez made his major league debut, in which he threw out two White Sox would-be base stealers. Rodríguez has three children: Dereck, Amanda, and Ivanna. In 1993, Rodríguez and his wife founded the Ivan "Pudge" Rodríguez Foundation, whose purpose is to help families in Puerto Rico, Dallas and Fort Worth, Texas. Rodríguez has also stated that the Make-a-Wish Foundation is one of his charities of choice. Their 15-year marriage ended in 2006 and Rodríguez married Colombia native Patricia Gómez in 2007.

== See also ==
- List of Major League Baseball career at-bat leaders
- List of Major League Baseball career doubles leaders
- List of Major League Baseball career extra base hits leaders
- List of Major League Baseball career games played as a catcher leaders
- List of Major League Baseball career hits leaders
- List of Major League Baseball career home run leaders
- List of Major League Baseball career putouts as a catcher leaders
- List of Major League Baseball career putouts leaders
- List of Major League Baseball career runs scored leaders
- List of Major League Baseball career runs batted in leaders
- List of Major League Baseball career total bases leaders
- List of Major League Baseball players from Puerto Rico
- List of second-generation Major League Baseball players
- List of Major League Baseball record holders
- Baseball in Puerto Rico

Sporting positions
Preceded by Juan González	Recipient of the Major League Baseball Player of the Month Award; April 1998	Succeeded by Bernie Williams
Preceded by Joe Randa	Recipient of the Major League Baseball Player of the Month Award; August 1999; Served alongside: Rafael Palmeiro	Succeeded by Albert Belle
Preceded by Melvin Mora	Recipient of the Major League Baseball Player of the Month Award; June 2004	Succeeded by Mark Teixeira
U.S. House of Representatives
New seat	Shadow Member of the U.S. House of Representatives from Puerto Rico; 2017–2018	Succeeded by Luis Berríos Amadeo
