= Vanja =

Vanja is a given name. It was originally a nickname for Ivan.

People with this name include:

- Vanja Babić (born 1981), Serbian taekwondo athlete
- Vanja Blomberg (born 1929), Swedish gymnast and Olympic champion
- Vanja Brodnik (born 1989), Slovenian alpine ski racer
- Vanja Bulić (born 1947), Serbian journalist and author
- Vanja Drach (1932–2009), Croatian theatre and film actor
- Vanja Drkušić (born 1999), Slovenian footballer
- Vanja Dukic, professor of applied mathematics at the University of Colorado Boulder
- Vanja Džaferović (born 1983), Bosnian and Croatian footballer
- Vanja Ejdus (born 1976), Serbian actress
- Vanja Gesheva-Tsvetkova (born 1960), Bulgarian sprint canoeist
- Vanja Grubač (born 1971), Montenegrin footballer
- Vanja Guša (born 1966), Serbian basketball coach
- Vanja Ilić (handballer) (born 1993), Serbian handball player
- Vanja Ilić (swimmer) (1927–2018), Yugoslav swimmer
- Vanja Iveša (born 1977), retired Croatian football goalkeeper
- Vanja Lazarova (1930–2017), Macedonian folk singer
- Vanja Marinković (born 1997), Serbian professional basketball player
- Vanja Marković (born 1994), Serbian professional footballer
- Vanja Mičeta (born 1969), synchronized swimmer from Serbia
- Vanja Milinković-Savić (born 1997), Serbian footballer
- Vanja Panić (born 2002), Slovenian footballer
- Vanja Perišić (born 1985), Croatian middle distance runner
- Vanja Plisnić (born 1980), Serbian former professional basketball player
- Vanja Radauš (1906–1975), Croatian sculptor, painter and writer
- Vanja Radinović (born 1972), Serbian football manager and former player
- Vanja Radovanović (born 1982), Montenegrin singer and songwriter
- Vanja Rogulj (born 1982), 3-time Olympics breaststroke swimmer from Croatia
- Vanja Rupena (born 1978), Croatian model
- Vanja Smiljanic (born 1990), Australian team handball player
- Vanja Stanković (born 1998), Serbian taekwondo practitioner
- Vanja Sutlić (1925–1989), Croatian philosopher
- Vanja Udovičić (born 1982), professional water polo player from Serbia
- Vanja Vonckx (born 1973), former Belgian racing cyclist
- Vanja Vučićević (born 1998), Serbian footballer
- Vanja Vukovic (born 1971), fine-art photographer and photo-designer living in Germany
- Vanja Y. Watkins (born 1938), writer of hymns of the LDS Church
- Vanja Zvekanov (born 2000), Serbian professional footballer

== See also ==
- Johannes Vanja (1893–1937), Estonian politician
- Vanya (disambiguation)
- Wanja, a given name
