= List of storms named Ivan =

The name Ivan has been used for three tropical cyclones in the Atlantic Ocean, one in the West Pacific Ocean, one in the South-West Indian Ocean, and one in the Australian region.

In the Atlantic:

- Hurricane Ivan (1980) – Category 2 hurricane that looped over the north-central Atlantic.
- Hurricane Ivan (1998) – Category 1 hurricane that stayed well out to sea.
- Hurricane Ivan (2004) – Category 5 hurricane, struck the Windward Islands, Jamaica, the Cayman Islands, Cuba, Alabama and Texas.

The name Ivan was retired after the 2004 season and replaced by Igor.

In the West Pacific:

- Typhoon Ivan (1997) (T9723, 27W, Narsing) – Category 5 super typhoon, struck the Philippines.

In the South-West Indian:

- Cyclone Ivan (2008) – made landfall on Madagascar, killing 93.

In the Australian region:

- Cyclone Ivan (1979) – remained over the open ocean.

== See also ==
- Tropical Storm Iman (2021) – a South-West Indian Ocean tropical cyclone with a similar name.
