= Ivan Pokaz =

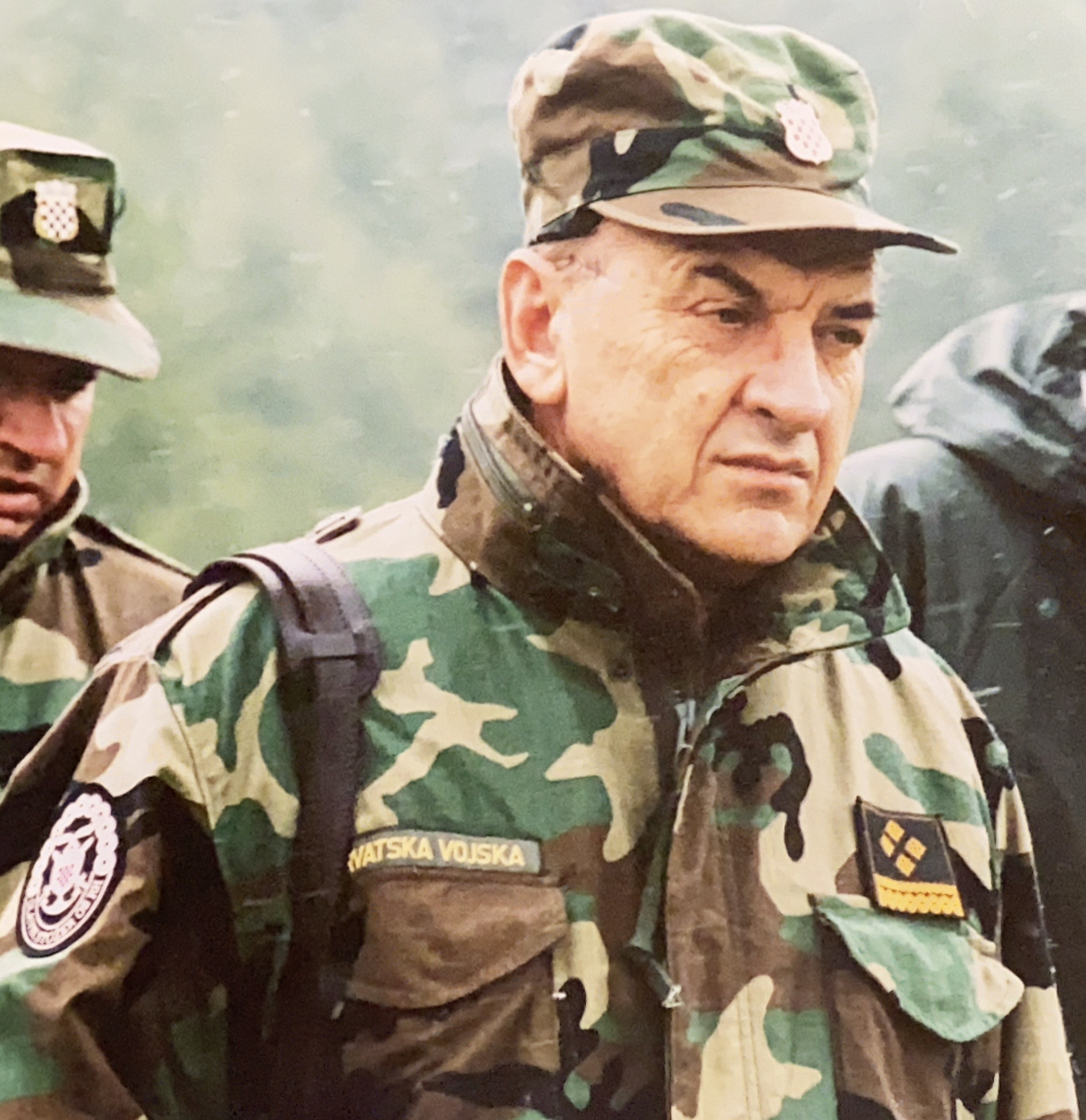
- General Ivan Pokaz
- Born: December 21, 1942 (age 83); Vrpolje
- Education: Military Academy, Zagreb; University of Zagreb
- Children: Igor Pokaz; Tomislav Pokaz
- Military career
- Allegiance: Republic of Croatia
- Branch: Croatian Army
- Rank: Brigadier general
- Commands: Military Intelligence at the General Staff of the Armed Forces
- Conflicts: Croatian War of Independence

Ivan Pokaz (born 21 December 1942) is a retired Croatian general who served as deputy head of intelligence at the General Staff of the Armed Forces during the Croatian War of Independence, and as head of military intelligence from 1996 until 2000.

He is married to Slavica, with whom he has two sons - Tomislav and Igor Pokaz.

== Military career ==
Ivan Pokaz was actively involved in the Croatian War of Independence from the Summer of 1991. He initially served as expert advisor for research, development and production in the Croatian Ministry of Defence. From 1992, he held positions within the General Staff, including Head of Department for electronic reconnaissance, and then Deputy Head of Intelligence.

From 1996 to 2000, Pokaz was the Head of Intelligence within the General Staff. He went on to serve as Croatia's military attaché to Austria, Slovakia, and the Organization for Security and Co-operation in Europe from 2001 until his retirement in 2003.

== After retirement ==
From 2006 to 2008, Pokaz worked closely with the defence of general Mladen Markač at the International Criminal Tribunal for the former Yugoslavia. Pokaz also produced an expert report that contributed to the defence of Ante Gotovina.

Pokaz was appointed to serve on the Defence Committee of the Croatian Parliament from 6 November 2017 until 22 July 2020.

Brigadier general Pokaz has authored numerous scientific research papers and scholarly articles in the fields of corporate security and the management of security risks. One of his most notable works is his analysis of the use of military intelligence during Operation Storm, detailed in his book "Storm - the response to the strategy of real threat".

He most recently co-authored the book "National Security of the Republic of Croatia in the 21st century", released in 2019. It is the first major study covering national security in the 21st century in Croatia and South-Eastern Europe.
