= Ivashko =

Ivashko (Ukrainian: Івашко) is a Ukrainian surname that may refer to:

- Markiyan Ivashko (born 1979), Ukrainian archer
- Petr Ivashko (born 1971), Belarusian biathlete
- Ruslan Ivashko (born 1986), Ukrainian footballer
- Vladimir Ivashko (1932–1994), Soviet and Ukrainian statesman, acting General Secretary of the Communist Party of the Soviet Union in 1991
