= Evan (disambiguation) =

Evan is a name, used generally as a male given name, also occurring as a surname.

Evan may also refer to:

== Places ==
- Evaň, Czech Republic
- Evan, Minnesota, USA
- Dun Evan, Highland, Scotland, a hillfort near Crawdor

== Other uses ==
- Cyclone Evan (2012), a South Pacific typhoon

== See also ==
- Evans (disambiguation)
- Euan
- Ewan (disambiguation)
- Even (disambiguation)
- Evens (disambiguation)
- Ewen
- Ewens
- Euin
- Evin (disambiguation)
- Evins
- Ewin
- Ewins
- Evon
