= Evonne =

Evonne is a given name, an English respelling of Yvonne. Well-known women named Evonne include:

- Evonne Britton (born 1991), American hurdler
- Evonne Goolagong, one of the world's leading women's tennis players in the 1970s and early-1980s
- Evonne Hsu, Taiwanese pop singer

== See also ==
- Evin (disambiguation)
- Evan
- Even (disambiguation)
- Evon (given name)
- Yvon (disambiguation)
- Ivon
