= Yves =

Yves may refer to:

- Yves, Charente-Maritime, a commune of the Charente-Maritime department in France
- Yves (single album), a single album by Loona
- Yves (film), a 2019 French film

== People ==
- Yves (given name), including a list of people with the name
- Yves Tumor, U.S. musician
- Yves (singer), South Korean singer and producer

== See also ==
- Eve (disambiguation)
- Evette (disambiguation)
- Yvette (disambiguation)
- Yvon (disambiguation)
- Yvonne (disambiguation)
