= Evon =

Evon is a given name. Notable people with the name include:

== Men ==
- Evon Blake (1906–1988), Jamaican journalist
- Evon Clarke (born 1965), Jamaican sprinter
- Evon McInnis (born 1980), Jamaican cricketer
- Evon Redman, Jamaican politician
- Evon Z. Vogt (1918–2004), American anthropologist
- Evon Daniel Williams (1896–1929), American professional baseball player; see Denny Williams

== Women ==
- Evon Dickson (1934–2012), New Zealand cricketer
- Evon Streetman (born 1932), American photographer

== See also ==
- Evan (disambiguation)
- Even (disambiguation)
- Evin (disambiguation)
- Evonne
- Ivon
- Yvon (disambiguation)
- Yvonne (disambiguation)
