= Iwona =

- Gender: Female

Origin
- Origin: Spanish, French
- Meaning: young archer, yew

Other names
- Related names: Ivonne, Yvonne

Iwona is a Polish female name derived from the French name Yvonne. Notable people with the name include:

- Iwona Blazwick (born 1955), British art critic and lecturer, director of the Whitechapel Art Gallery in London
- Iwona Blecharczyk (born 1987), Polish truck driver, business owner and YouTuber
- Iwona Buczkowska (born 1953), Polish-born French architect and urban planner
- Iwona Chmielewska (born 1960), Polish author and illustrator, who publishes mainly for children
- Iwona Daniluk (born 1973), Polish biathlete
- Iwona Filipowicz (born 1976), Polish competitive ice dancer
- Katarzyna Iwona Jurkowska-Kowalska (born 1992), Polish artistic gymnast
- Iwona Kuczyńska (born 1961), professional tennis player from Poland
- Iwona Lewandowska (born 1985), Polish long distance runner who specialises in the marathon
- Iwona Marcinkiewicz (born 1975), athlete from Poland
- Iwona Matkowska (born 1982), Polish freestyle wrestler
- Iwona Niedźwiedź (born 1979), Polish handball player
- Iwona Pyżalska, Polish sprint canoeist who competed in the mid-2000s
- Iwona Śledzińska-Katarasińska (1941–2024), Polish politician
- Iwona Sobotka (born 1981), Polish soprano
- Iwona Stroynowski (born 1950), Polish-born American immunologist, Professor at University of Texas Southwestern Medical Center

== See also ==
- Iona
- Iwon (disambiguation)
- WONA (disambiguation)
