= Yvonne =

Yvonne (/ɪ.ˈvɒn/, ih-VON) (cro. Žavon) is a feminine given name, the female form of Yvon, which is derived from the French name Yves and Yvette. It is from the French word iv, meaning "yew" (or tree). Since yew wood was used for bows, Ivo may have been an occupational name meaning "archer". Yvonne/Ivonne is also a Spanish girl name.

This name first arrived in England with the Norman invasion, along with variations such as Yvette and male versions of the same name. It was reintroduced into English-speaking countries in the early 20th century. It is currently 173rd in the United States popular names list. It has also lost popularity in France, where in 1900 it was the 7th most popular name.

Yvonne has several name days: May 29 in Sweden and December 11th in Ireland and Scotland.

== People ==
- Yvonne Adair (1897–1989), English composer, pianist, and teacher
- Yvonne Agazarian (1929–2017), English psychotherapist
- Yvonne Aitken (1911–2004), Australian agricultural scientist
- Yvonne Anderson (born 1990), American–Serbian basketball player
- Yvonne Andersson (born 1951), Swedish politician
- Yvonne Andres, American educator
- Yvonne Arnaud (1890–1958), French actress
- Yvonne Artaud (1924–2009), French artist, educator, ethnologist, and psychologist
- Yvonne Atwell (born 1943), Canadian activist, politician, and hospital administrator
- Yvonne Audette (born 1930), Australian abstract artist
- Yvonne Banvard (1901–1962), Australian actress
- Yvonne Barr (1932–2016), Irish virologist
- Yvonne Barrett (1946–1985), Australian singer
- Yvonne Baseden (1922–2017), French secret agent
- Yvonne Bezard (1893–1939), French archivist
- Yvonne Bijenhof (born 1966), Dutch politician
- Yvonne Blake (1940–2018), English–Spanish costume designer
- Yvonne Braithwaite Burke (born 1932), American lawyer and politician
- Yvonne Brewster (1938–2025), Jamaican actress
- Yvonne Bryceland (1925–1992), South African actress
- Yvonne Bürgin (born 1970), Swiss politician
- Yvonne Cagle (born 1959), American astronaut, physicist, and professor
- Yvonne Caples (born 1972), American boxer
- Yvonne Catterfeld (born 1979), German singer and actress
- Yvonne Chaka Chaka (born 1965), South African singer
- Yvonne Chauffin (1905–1995), French writer
- Yvonne Cherrie (born 1981), Tanzanian actress
- Yvonne Choquet-Bruhat (1923–2025), French mathematical physicist
- Yvonne Chouteau (1929–2016), American ballet dancer
- Yvonne Clark (1929–2019), American mechanical engineer
- Yvonne Craig (1937–2015), American ballet dancer
- Yvonne Cryns (born 1951), American midwife and political activist
- Yvonne Daldossi (born 1992), Italian speed skater
- Yvonne Daunt (1899–1962), French dancer
- Yvonne Dausab, Namibian lawyer and politician
- Yvonne Davis (born 1955), American politician
- Yvonne De Carlo (1922–2007), Canadian–American actress
- Yvonne De Rosa (born 1975), Italian photographer
- Yvonne Desportes (1907–1993), French composer, writer, and music educator
- Yvonne Domenge (1946–2019), Mexican sculptor
- Yvonne Drewry (1918–2007), English artist and art teacher
- Yvonne Duarte (born 1963), Brazilian martial artist
- Yvonne Ejim (born 2002), Canadian basketball player
- Yvonne Ekwere (born 1987), Nigerian actress and media personality
- Yvonne Elkuch (born 1968), Liechtensteiner cyclist
- Yvonne Elliman (born 1951), American actress, singer, and songwriter
- Yvonne Farrell (born 1951), Irish academic and architect
- Yvonne Fovargue (born 1956), British politician
- Yvonne Frank (born 1980), German field hockey player
- Yvonne Furneaux (1926–2024), French–English actress
- Yvonne Gage (born 1959), American singer
- Yvonne Gall (1885–1972), French operatic lyric soprano
- Yvonne Gardelle (1897–1979), American actress and dancer
- Yvonne George (1896–1930), Belgian actress and singer
- Yvonne Gilan (1931–2018), Scottish actress, writer, and vocal coach
- Yvonne Gómez (born 1966), Spanish–American figure skater
- Yvonne Gonzalez Rogers (born 1965), American judge and lawyer
- Yvonne Gouverné (1890–1982), French pianist
- Yvonne Graves (born 1998), English cricketer
- Yvonne Green (1957–2024), English barrister, poet, translator, and writer
- Yvonne Hackenbroch (1912–2012), German–born British museum curator and historian of jewellery
- Yvonne Haddad, Syrian-born American Islamic scholar
- Yvonne Hasler (born 1968), Lichtensteiner heptathlete and sprinter
- Yvonne Hayes Hinson, American politician
- Yvonne Hijgenaar (born 1980), Dutch racing cyclist and speed skater
- Yvonne Hill (born 1937), Australian sport shooter
- Yvonne Hirdman (born 1943), Swedish historian and gender researcher
- Yvonne Howell (1905–2010), American actress
- Yvonne J. Huang, American pulmonologist and physician-scientist
- Yvonne Hubert (1895–1988), Belgian–born Canadian pedagogue and pianist
- Yvonne Hudson (born 1955), American actress and comedian
- Yvonne Hutton (1941–1992), British comics artist
- Yvonne Ingdal (1939–2022), Danish actress
- Yvonne Jacquette (1934–2023), American painter and printmaker
- Yvonne Jammet (1900–1967), French landscape painter and sculptor
- Yvonne Johnson (1942–2024), American politician
- Yvonne Jones (born 1968), Canadian politician
- Yvonne Jospa (1910–2000), Belgian resistance fighter
- Yvonne Jourjon (1899–1985), French pilot and flight instructor
- Yvonne Kanazawa (born 1974), Japanese athlete
- Yvonne Kauger (born 1937), American attorney and judge
- Yvonne Keeley (born 1952), Dutch singer
- Yvonne Kennedy (1945–2012), American politician and college president
- Yvonne Kenny (born 1950), Australian opera singer
- Yvonne Keuls (1931–2025), Dutch writer
- Yvonne Khamati (born c. 1982), Kenyan politician
- Yvonne Koolmatrie (born 1944), Australian artist and weaver
- Yvonne Kroonenberg (born 1950), Dutch author and psychologist
- Yvonne Kunze (born 1978), German short-track speed skater
- Yvonne Lacroix (1892–1944), French figure skater
- Yvonne Lammerich (born 1946), German-born Canadian curator, writer, and visual artist
- Yvonne Lefébure (1898–1986), French pianist and teacher
- Yvonne Lim (born 1976), Singaporean actress
- Yvonne Lindholm (born 1966), Swedish politician
- Yvonne Lindsay, New Zealand romance novelist
- Yvonne Lopez (born 1957), American politician
- Yvonne Loriod (1924–2010), French pianist
- Yvonne Lui (born 1976), Hong Kong–based businesswoman and philanthropist
- Yvonne Lyon, Scottish musician
- Yvonne Maginley (died 2019), Antiguan composer and the former deputy governor-general of Antigua and Barbuda
- Yvonne Mboissona (born 1957), Central African politician
- Yvonne Mburu (born 1982), Kenyan immunologist
- Yvonne McGuinness (born 1972), Irish visual artist
- Yvonne Meusburger Garamszegi (born 1983), Austrian tennis player
- Yvonne Minton (born 1938), Australian opera singer
- Yvonne Mitchell (1915–1979), English actress and author
- Yvonne Monlaur (1939–2017), French actress
- Yvonne Mosquito (born 1964), English politician
- Yvonne Mounsey (1919–2012), South African–American ballet dancer and teacher
- Yvonne Musarurwa, Zimbabwean politician and political rights activist
- Yvonne Naef (1957–2025), Swiss operatic mezzo-soprano
- Yvonne Navarro (born 1957), American author
- Yvonne Nelson (born 1985), Ghanaian actress and entrepreneur
- Yvonne Odic, (1890–1983), French mechanical engineer.
- Yvonne Okoro (born 1984), Ghanaian–Nigerian actress
- Yvonne Oldfield, Jamaican cricketer
- Yvonne Orji (born 1983), Nigerian–American actress and comedian
- Yvonne Pendleton (born 1957), American astrophysicist
- Yvonne Perry (born 1966), American actress
- Yvonne Picard (1920–1943), French philosopher and resistance fighter
- Yvonne Pitrois (1880–1937), French writer
- Yvonne Ploetz (born 1984), German politician
- Yvonne Porcella (1936–2016), American art quilter
- Yvonne Pouzin (1884–1947), French physician
- Yvonne Preiswerk (1937–1999), Swiss anthropologist
- Yvonne Prévost (1878–1942), French tennis player
- Yvonne Printemps (1894–1977), French actress and singer
- Yvonne Rainer (born 1934), American dancer
- Yvonne Rainsford (born 1983), Zimbabwean cricketer
- Yvonne Rand (1935–2020), American meditation teacher and priest
- Yvonne Reynders (born 1937), Belgian cyclist
- Yvonne Ridley (born 1958), English author, journalist, and politician
- Yvonne Rokseth (1890–1948), French composer, musicologist, organist, violinist, writer, and resistance fighter
- Yvonne Ross, American actress
- Yvonne Rudellat (1897–1945), French secret agent
- Yvonne Rust (1922–2002), New Zealand potter
- Yvonne Ruwaida (born 1970), German–born Swedish politician
- Yvonne Ryding (born 1962), Swedish beauty queen, dancer, and model
- Yvonne Sanchez (born 1967), American basketball coach
- Yvonne Sanson (1925–2003), Greek–Italian actress
- Yvonne Sapia (born 1946), American poet
- Yvonne Saunders (born 1951), Jamaican–born English–Canadian track and field athlete
- Yvonne Sciò (born 1969), Italian actress and model
- Yvonne Seifert (born 1964), German freestyle skier
- Yvonne Serruys (1873–1953), Belgian–French sculptor
- Yvonne Sherman (1930–2005), American figure skater
- Yvonne Stokes, Australian mathematician
- Yvonne Strahovski (born 1982), Australian actress
- Yvonne Tasker (born 1964), English scholar
- Yvonne Thomas (1913–2009), French–born American abstract artist
- Yvonne Thompson, Guyanese–born British business leader
- Yvonne Tobis (born 1948), Israeli swimmer
- Yvonne Todd (born 1973), New Zealand photographer
- Yvonne Tousek (born 1980), Canadian artistic gymnast
- Yvonne Trevino (born 1967), American boxer and kickboxer
- Yvonne Treviño (born 1989), Mexican track and field athlete
- Yvonne Tsikata, Ghanaian economist
- Yvonne Turner (born 1987), American–Hungarian basketball player
- Yvonne Vallée (1899–1996), French actress
- Yvonne van Dorp (born 1966), Dutch sprinter and long jumper
- Yvonne van Gennip (born 1964), Dutch speed skater
- Yvonne van Mentz, South African cricketer
- Yvonne van Vlerken (born 1978), Dutch triathlete
- Yvonne Vandekerckhove (1920–2012), Belgian swimmer
- Yvonne Vera (1964–2005), Zimbabwean author
- Yvonne Verbeeck (1913–2012), Belgian actress
- Yvonne Vermaak (born 1956), South African tennis player
- Yvonne Visser (born 1965), Canadian biathlete
- Yvonne Walker (born 1959), American labor union leader and activist
- Yvonne Weldon, Australian politician
- Yvonne Yao (born 1981), Taiwanese actress
- Yvonne Yung (born 1968), Chinese actress and beauty queen
- Yvonne Ziegler (1902–1988), French resistance fighter, artist, and educator
- Yvonne Zima (born 1989), American actress

== Fictional characters ==
- Miss Yvonne, Pee-wee's Playhouse character
- Yvonne Atkins, character from the British drama series Bad Girls; portrayed by Linda Henry
- Yvonne Casey, character from the British soap opera Coronation Street; portrayed by Yvonne O'Grady
- Yvonne Cotton, character from the British soap opera EastEnders; portrayed by Pauline McLynn
- Yvonne Doyle (Fair City), character from the Irish soap opera Fair City; portrayed by Ciara O'Callaghan
- Yvonne Jeffries, character from the New Zealand soap opera Shortland Street; portrayed by Alison Quigan
- Yvonne Parker, character from American drama series Orange Is the New Black, portrayed by Lorraine Toussaint
- Yvonne Teasley, Beverly Hills, 90210 character; portrayed by Denise Dowse

== Variations ==
- Croatian language: Ivona
- Czech language: Ivana, Ivona, Yvona
- German language: Ivonne
- Greek language: Υβόννη (Yvonni)
- Irish language: Aoibheann, Aoibhinn
- Italian language: Ivana
- Latvian language: Ivonna
- Macedonian language: Ивoна (Ivona)
- Malaysian language: Eevon
- Polish language: Iwona
- Portuguese language: Ivone
- Romanian language: Ivona, Ivonn
- Serbian language: Ивoна (Ivona)
- Slovene language: Ivona
- Spanish language: Ivón, Ivona, Ivone
- Swahili language: Yvonne (Ivoni)

== See also ==
- Evonne
- Siobhan
