= Yeivin =

Yeivin is a surname. notable people with the surname include:

- Esther Yeivin (1877–1975), Israeli politician and women's rights activist
- Israel Yeivin (1923–2008), Israeli linguist and Hebrew scholar
- Shemuel Yeivin (1896–1982), Israeli archaeologist
- Yehoshua Yeivin (1891–1970), Israeli doctor, writer and politician

== See also ==
- Sergei Yevin (born 1977), Russian footballer
- Evin (name)
