= Ivon =

Ivon is a masculine given name. Notable people with the name include:

- Ivon Hitchens (1893-1979), English painter
- Ivon Le Duc (21st century), Canadian politician
- Ivon Moore-Brabazon, 3rd Baron Brabazon of Tara (born 1946), British politician
- Ivon Vernon Wilson (1885-1974), New Zealand dentist

== See also ==
- Evin (disambiguation)
- Evan
- Even (disambiguation)
- Yvon (disambiguation)
- Evon (given name)
- Evonne
