= Yvette (disambiguation) =

Yvette is a French feminine given name.

Yvette may also refer to:

== Places ==
- Yvette (river), a river in France
- Gif-sur-Yvette, a commune in France
  - Canton of Gif-sur-Yvette
- Villebon-sur-Yvette, a commune in France
- 1340 Yvette, a main-belt asteroid

== People with the surname ==
- Mercedes Yvette (born 1981), U.S. fashion model

== Entertainment ==
- "Yvette", a short story by Guy de Maupassant published in 1884
- Yvette, the Fashion Princess, a 1922 German silent comedy film
- Yvette (1928 film), a French silent drama directed by Alberto Cavalcanti
- Yvette (1938 film), a German historical drama directed by Wolfgang Liebeneiner

== Other uses ==
- Tropical Storm Yvette, the name Yvette has been used for several tropical cyclones worldwide
- Creme Yvette, a liqueur

== See also ==
- Evette (disambiguation)
- Yvonne (disambiguation)
- Yvon (disambiguation)
- Yves (disambiguation)
- Eve (disambiguation)
