= Chevron (insignia) =

V-shaped or inverted-V-shaped symbol

An "Argent a chevron gules" in heraldic terminology

A chevron (also spelled cheveron, especially in older documents) is a V-shaped mark or symbol, often inverted. The word is usually used in reference to a kind of fret in architecture, or to a badge or insignia used in military or police uniforms to indicate rank or length of service, or in heraldry and the designs of flags (see flag terminology).

== Ancient history ==
Appearing on pottery and petrographs throughout the ancient world, the chevron can be considered to be one of the oldest symbols in human history, with V-shaped markings occurring as early as the Neolithic era (6th to 5th millennia BC) as part of the Vinča symbols inventory. The Vinča culture responsible for the symbols appear to have used the chevron as part of a larger proto-writing system rather than any sort of heraldic or decorative use, and are not known to have passed the symbol on to any subsequent cultures.

Many comparatively recent examples appear from approximately 1800 BC onward, beginning as part of an archaeological recovery of pottery designs from the palace of Knossos on Crete in the modern day country of Greece. Furthermore the Nubian Kingdom of Kerma produced pottery with decorative repertoire confined to geometric designs such as chevrons.

== Heraldry ==
A chevron is one of the heraldic ordinaries, the simple geometrical figures which are the foundation of many coats of arms. A chevron is constructed by choosing a visually appealing angle such as the golden angle or any other angle the artist prefers. It can be subject to a number of modifications including inversion. When the ends are cut off in a way that looks like the splintered ends of a broken piece of wood, with an irregular zig-zag pattern, it is called éclaté. When shown as a smaller size than standard, it is a diminutive called a chevronel.

Chevrons appeared early in the history of heraldry, especially in Normandy. In Scandinavia the chevron is known as sparre; an early example appears in the arms of Arvid Gustavsson Sparre.

Trans, Hinterrhein, Graubünden, Switzerland

Chevron wavy: Bioley-Magnoux, Jura-Nord Vaudois District, Vaud, Switzerland

Chevron inverted: Newport, Wales.

Chevron and chevron inverted, interlaced: Bolligen, Bern district, Canton of Bern, Switzerland

Chevronny: Avry, Sarine district, Canton of Fribourg, Switzerland

== Rank insignia ==
=== Military ===
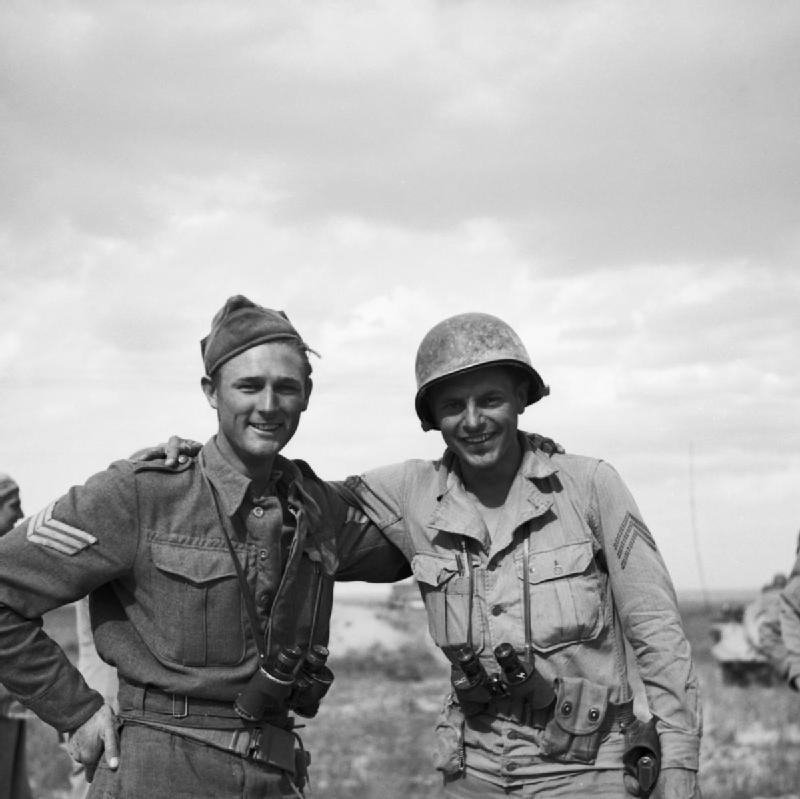
A British lance sergeant (left) with an American sergeant (right) in 1943; both have rank chevrons on their uniforms

In Western European tradition, chevrons are used as an insignia of the ranks variously known, depending on the country, as non-commissioned officer or sub-officer ranks. This usage has become the worldwide norm, but there are many exceptions where other insignia, typically stripes but sometimes stars, are used for such ranks instead.

Many countries, such as France and Italy, use chevrons proper, or colloquially, the chevrons "point up". Many others, such as most Commonwealth countries, use inverted chevrons, or colloquially, the chevrons "point down."

In the United States, the Army and Marines use chevrons proper (although prior to the 20th century this was not true), while the Air Force, Navy, and Coast Guard use inverted chevrons. Arcs, known as "rockers", are also added to chevrons to indicate higher rank.

English-speaking countries tend to use three chevrons for a sergeant and two for a corporal.

Canadian and Australian Forces often refer to chevrons as "hooks". In the Dutch armed forces they are nicknamed "banana peels".

In the British Army, Royal Marines and Royal Air Force, chevrons are worn point down to denote non-commissioned officer rank, with one for lance corporal, two for corporal, three for sergeant, and three with a crown for staff sergeant (known as colour sergeant in infantry regiments and the Royal Marines) or flight sergeant (RAF). Branch and tradition results in variations in rank titles (corporal of horse being the equivalent of sergeant in the Household Cavalry) and spellings (serjeant in The Rifles). Large chevrons are also worn on the sleeves of Royal Navy sailors to denote good conduct rather than rank.

Although usually associated with non-commissioned officers, the chevron was originally used as an insignia to denote general officer ranks in the British Army. It was adopted from the insignia worn by cavalry during the 18th century, in particular the Household Cavalry. It was worn on the cuffs, forearms and tails of their coats, embroidered in gold bullion for the guards and silver for dragoons regiments. George III favoured the uniform of the Horse Guards, and his Windsor uniform followed a similar pattern. After 1768, a similar pattern uniform as worn by the King was introduced to general officers, with the number and spacing of the chevrons denoting rank. For example, a major general would wear his chevrons in pairs: two on the sleeves, and two on the tails. A lieutenant general would wear them in groups of three, and a full general's would be equidistant. This practice continued into the early Victorian era.

==== Examples ====
Lance corporal
(British Army)

Private
(United States Army)

=== Police ===
Much like militaries police use of chevrons are often for non-commissioned officers and vary between nation and service.

Most police services use chevrons on rank insignia to denote a Constable or Senior Constable with one chevron and Sergeant with stacked three chevrons. There are some exceptions such as the Queensland Police Service Senior Constable which rank insignia denotes two stacked chevrons. In some services Senior Sergeants also denote chevrons on rank insignia often with a 'Queen’s Crown' incorporated.

New Zealand Police Senior Constable

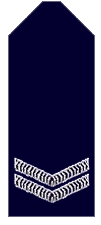
New South Wales Police Force Senior Constable

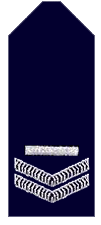
New South Wales Police Force Incremental-Senior-Constable

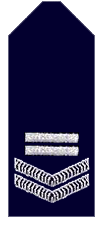
New South Wales Police Force Leading-Senior-Constable

New Zealand Police Sergeant

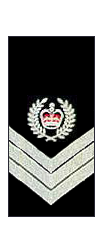
Victoria Police Senior Sergeant

== Vexillology ==
In vexillology, a chevron is a V-shaped stripe placed on a flag. It most often issues from the hoist and points toward the fly, or rises from the base and points upward. Chevrons may also be inverted and can appear in other orientations or placements across the field. The device may be narrow or broad, single or repeated, and may reach the flag’s edges or be couped (not touching them). A well-known example of a true chevron in flag design is the flag of the North American Vexillological Association. Other examples include the flag of Evaň, Czech Republic, Tulsky, Russia or the flag of the Southern African Vexillological Association, which contains two chevrons, one inverted. A chevron is not to be confused with a triangle, wedge, or pile, which are solid shapes rather than angled stripes.

Flag of the North American Vexillological Association with a chevron inverted

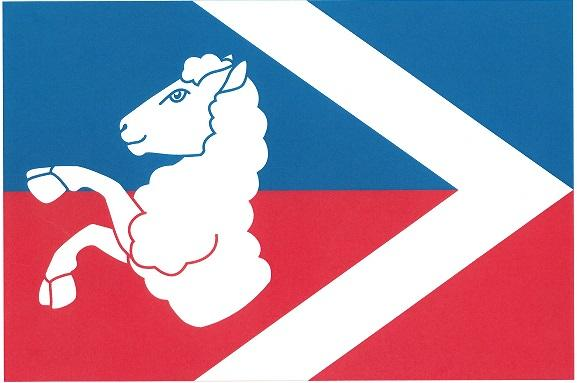
Flag of Evaň, Czech Republic, with a fly-pointing chevron separate from the hoist

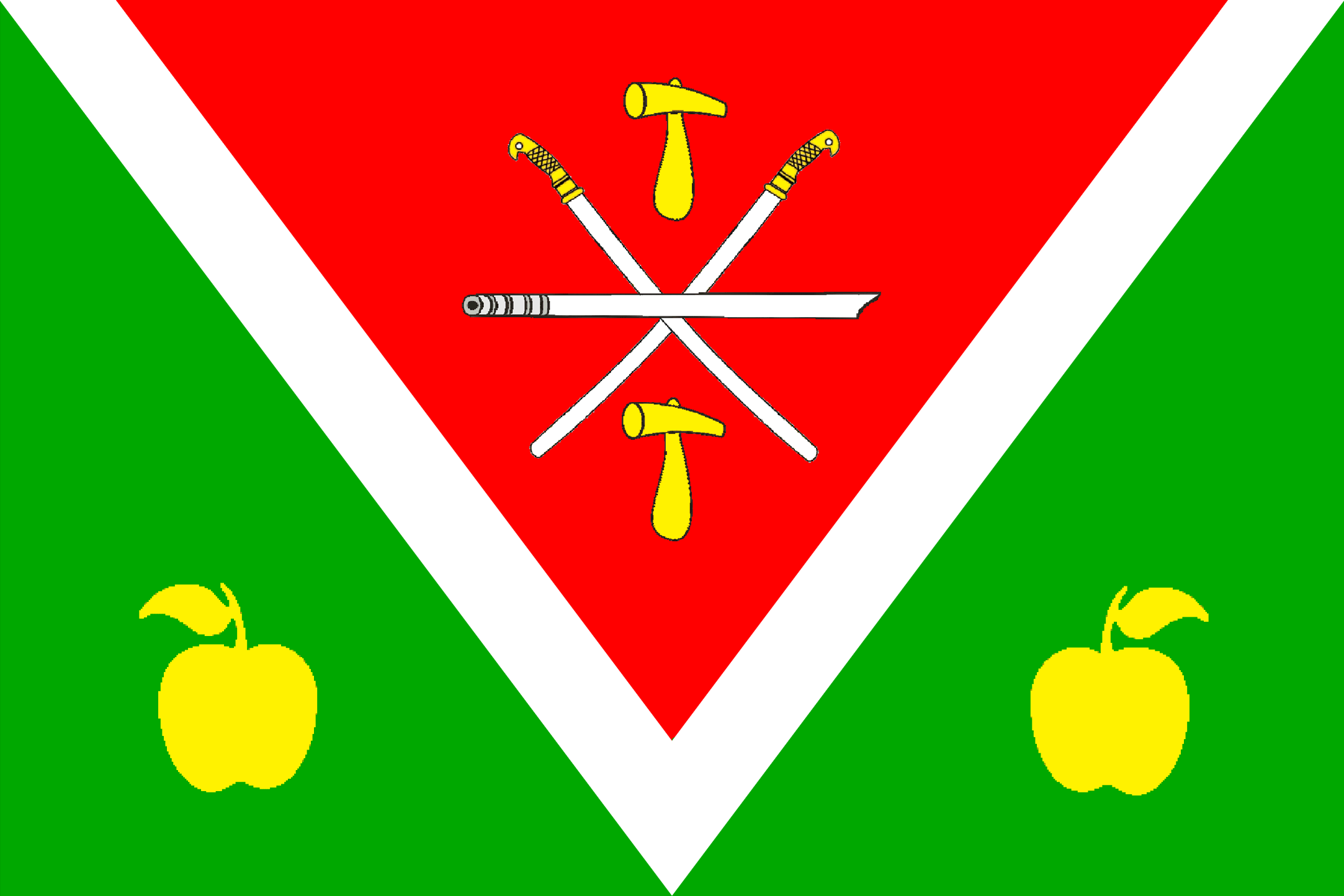
Flag of Tulsky, Russia

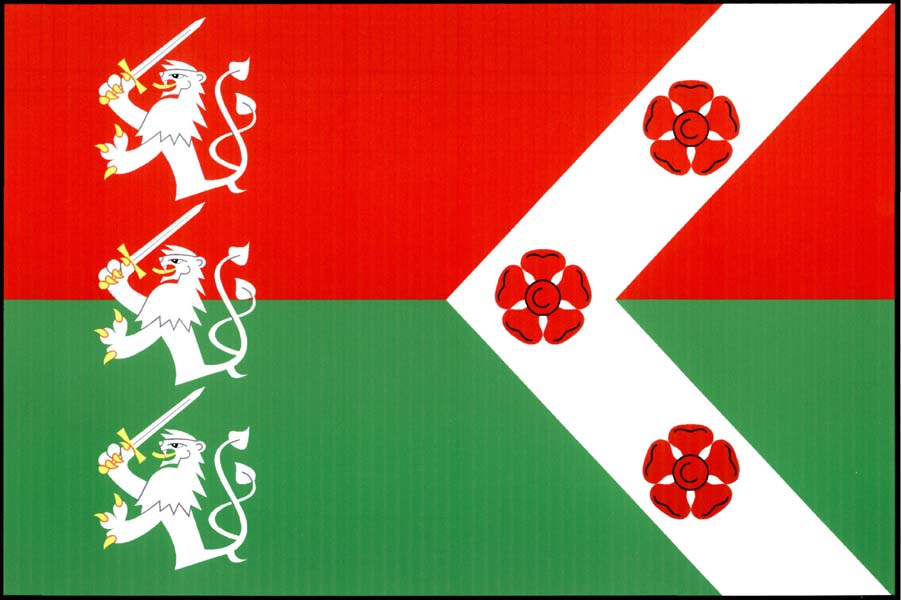
Flag of Verušičky, Czech Republic, with a fly chevron

Flag of Vimperk, Czech Republic, with hoist chevron counterchanged

Flag of Předklášteří, Czech Republic, with chevron "in the shape of a gothic arch"

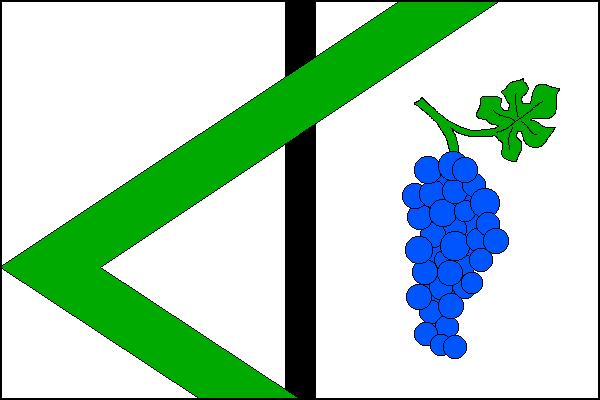
Flag of Sobůlky, Czech Republic, with an irregular chevron

== Other uses as insignia ==
Chevron used on Russian military vehicles during the 2022 Russian invasion of Ukraine

In some armies, small chevrons are worn on the lower left sleeve to indicate length of service, akin to service stripes in the U.S. military. The Israel Defense Forces use chevrons in various orientations as organizational designators on their vehicles, specifically which company within a battalion they belong to.

NATO armed forces use the "Λ" chevron as insignia to represent the alliance between different armies, during peacekeeping missions.

The US-led coalition that took part in Operation Desert Storm used a black "Λ" chevron in a similar manner as NATO forces use it on their ground vehicles. The design was created by a soldier from the 3rd Armored Division after the US military sought markings to identify coalition vehicles due to increased fratricide incidents. Its symbolism, according to the artist SGT Grzywa, was meant to be a V for Victory, a tribute to WWII Coalition Forces.

"V" chevrons were historically used as the insignia of the Russian Volunteer Army during the Russian Civil War, and in modern times as one of the military insignia by Russian forces during the 2022 Russian invasion of Ukraine, and Russian civilians have used it in support of their government.

French car maker Citroën uses a double chevron as its logo.

Chevrons on their side are also used as road signs to denote bends.

From the early 1950s until the early 2000s, Simplex, Faraday and many other companies manufactured the chevron series fire alarm manual pull station. The handle was shaped in a way where the handle looked like an inverted chevron.

== See also ==
- Arrow (symbol)
- Circumflex, a chevron-shaped diacritical mark
- Caron/haček, a diacritical mark known as "inverted chevron"
