= Ivona =

Ivona or Ивoна is a Slavic variant of the female given name Yvonne. Notable people with the name include:

- Ivona Bogoje (born 1976), Croatian basketball player
- Ivona Brandić (born 1977), Bosnian-Austrian computer scientist
- Ivona Březinová (born 1964), Czech writer
- Ivona Dadić (born 1993), Austrian Olympic track and field athlete of Croatian descent
- Ivona Fialková (born 1994), Slovak biathlete
- Ivona Jerković (born 1984), Serbian basketball player
- Ivona Juka, Croatian and Montenegrin film director
- Ivona Matić (born 1986), Croatian basketball player
- Ivona Pavićević (born 1996), Montenegrin handball player

== See also ==
- Iwona
- Amazon Echo, which uses voice recognition technology from Polish firm Ivona
