= Evette =

Evette or variation, may refer to:

== People ==
- Pamela Evette (born 1967), American politician

=== People with the given name ===
- Evette Branson (1924-2021), British philanthropist and mother of Richard Branson
- Evette Dionne, American author
- Evette de Klerk (born 1965), South African athlete
- Evette Moran Nib, namesake of the Mark and Evette Moran Nib Award for Literature
- Evette Pabalan-Onayan, member of the Philippine group SexBomb Girls
- Evette Rios, television host

=== Fictional characters ===
- Evette, a fictional character from the 2003 film Pieces of April
- Evette, a fictional character from the 2014 film Paranormal Activity: The Marked Ones
- Evette Chase, a fictional character from the TV show The Sex Lives of College Girls
- Evette Peeters, a fictional character from the TV show American Girl; see List of American Girl characters

== Places ==
- Évette, Évette-Salbert, Valdoie, Belfort, Bourgogne-Franche-Comté, France; a village
- Lac des Évettes (Évettes Lake), Vanoise Massif, Savoie, France; a lake
- Refuge des Évettes, an alpine refuge in the Alps

== Other uses ==
- Evette clarinet brand

== See also ==
- Eve (disambiguation)
- Yvette (disambiguation)
