= Evin (name) =

Evin is a given name and a surname.

== Given name ==
- Evin Agassi (1945-2024), Iranian-born Assyrian singer
- Evin Ahmad (born 1990), Sweden-born actress of Kurdish origin
- Evin Crowley (born 1945), British actress
- Evin Demirhan (born 1995), Turkish sport wrestler
- Evin Erginoğuz (born 2002), Turkish boxer
- Evin Esen (1949–2012), Turkish actress
- Evin Lewis (born 1991), Trinidad and Tobago cricket player
- Evin Rubar (born 1975), Sweden-born journalist of Kurdish origin

== Surname ==
- Claude Évin (born 1949), French politician
- Devrim Evin (born 1978), Turkish actor
- Mike Evin (born 1979), Canadian singer-songwriter
- Tasha-Ray Evin (born 1985) and Lacey-Lee Brass (née Evin) (born 1983), one half of the Canadian rock band Lillix

== See also ==
- Sergei Yevin (born 1977), Russian association football player
- Evin (disambiguation)
- Evan (disambiguation)
