= Iwon =

Iwon may refer to:

- Iwon or Iwŏn (Korean: 이원), the common South Korean romanization of
  - Riwon (리원읍, Riwŏn-ŭp), a town in North Korea
  - Riwon County (리원군, Riwŏn-kun), a county in North Korea
- Iwon station (이원역, Iwon-yeok) on the Gyeongbu Line in South Korea
- iWon, an internet portal and search engine
