= Evenness =

Evenness may refer to:

- Species evenness
- evenness of numbers, for which see parity (mathematics)
  - evenness of zero, a special case of the above

== See also ==
- Even (disambiguation)
