= Yvon =

Yvon may refer to:

- Yvon Chouinard, American mountain climber (born 1938)
- Yvon (given name), a masculine given name
- Yvon (surname), a surname

== See also ==
- Chapelle-Yvon
- Evon
- Ivon
- Jaille-Yvon
- Pierre-Yvon
- Yvan
- Yvonne (disambiguation)
