= Holiday Inn Express =

Hotel chain

Holiday Inn Express by IHG
- Type: Subsidiary
- Industry: Hotels
- Founded: 1990; 36 years ago
- Number of locations: 2,826 (2019)
- Area served: Worldwide
- Parent: Holiday Inn
- Website: www.hiexpress.com

Holiday Inn Express by IHG is an American-based mid-priced hotel chain within the IHG Hotels & Resorts family of brands. Originally founded as an "express" hotel, their focus is on offering limited services at a reasonable price. Standard amenities lean toward the convenient and practical which cater to business travelers and short-term stays. As of September 2019, there are 2,826 Holiday Inn Express hotels featuring over 292,000 rooms worldwide. The chain's concept was intended to target the "upper economy" market segment.

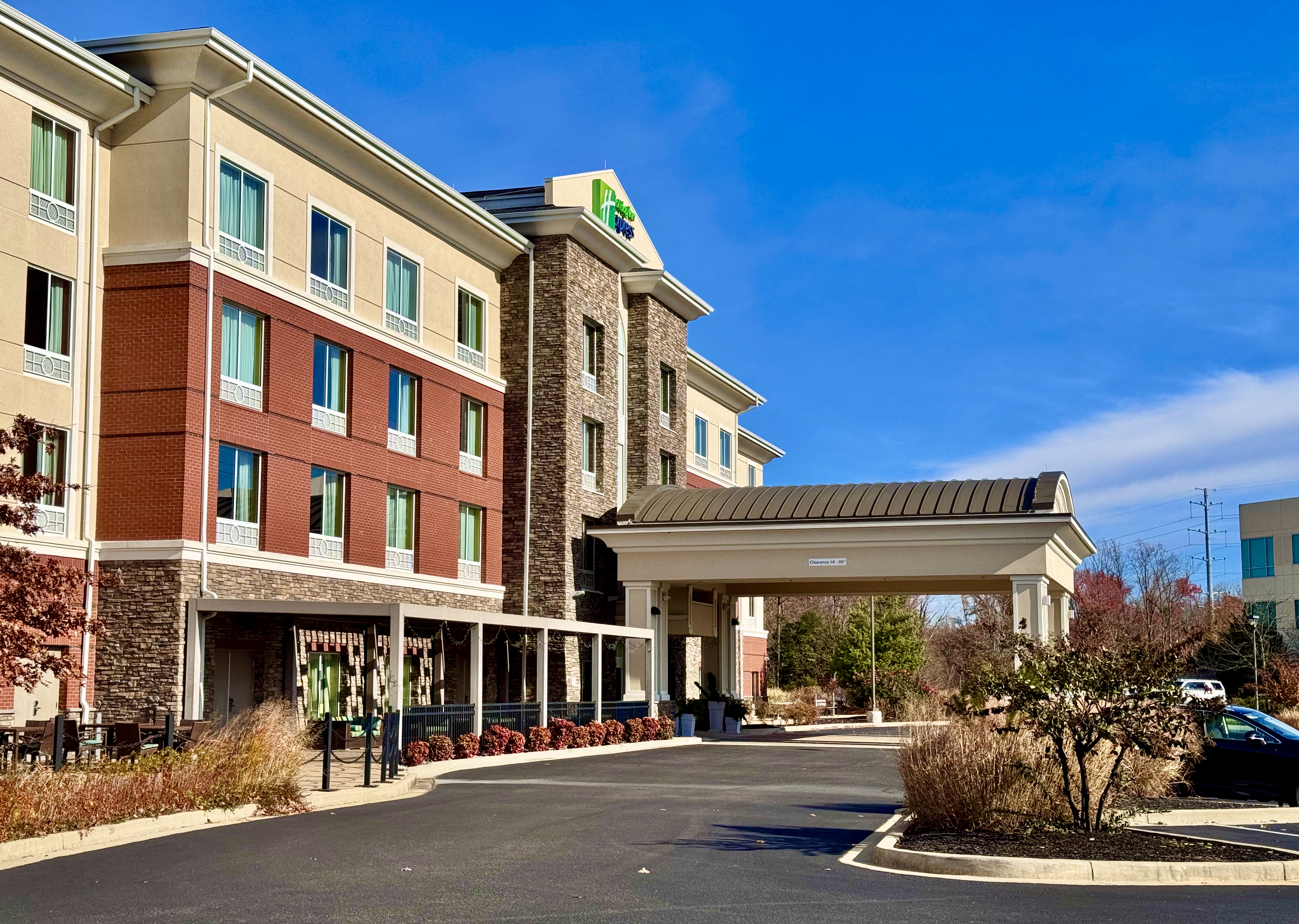
Holiday Inn Express & Suites in California, Maryland

In Europe, the hotels were known as Express by Holiday Inn, but this variation was phased out during a rebranding which was announced in 2006.

== History ==
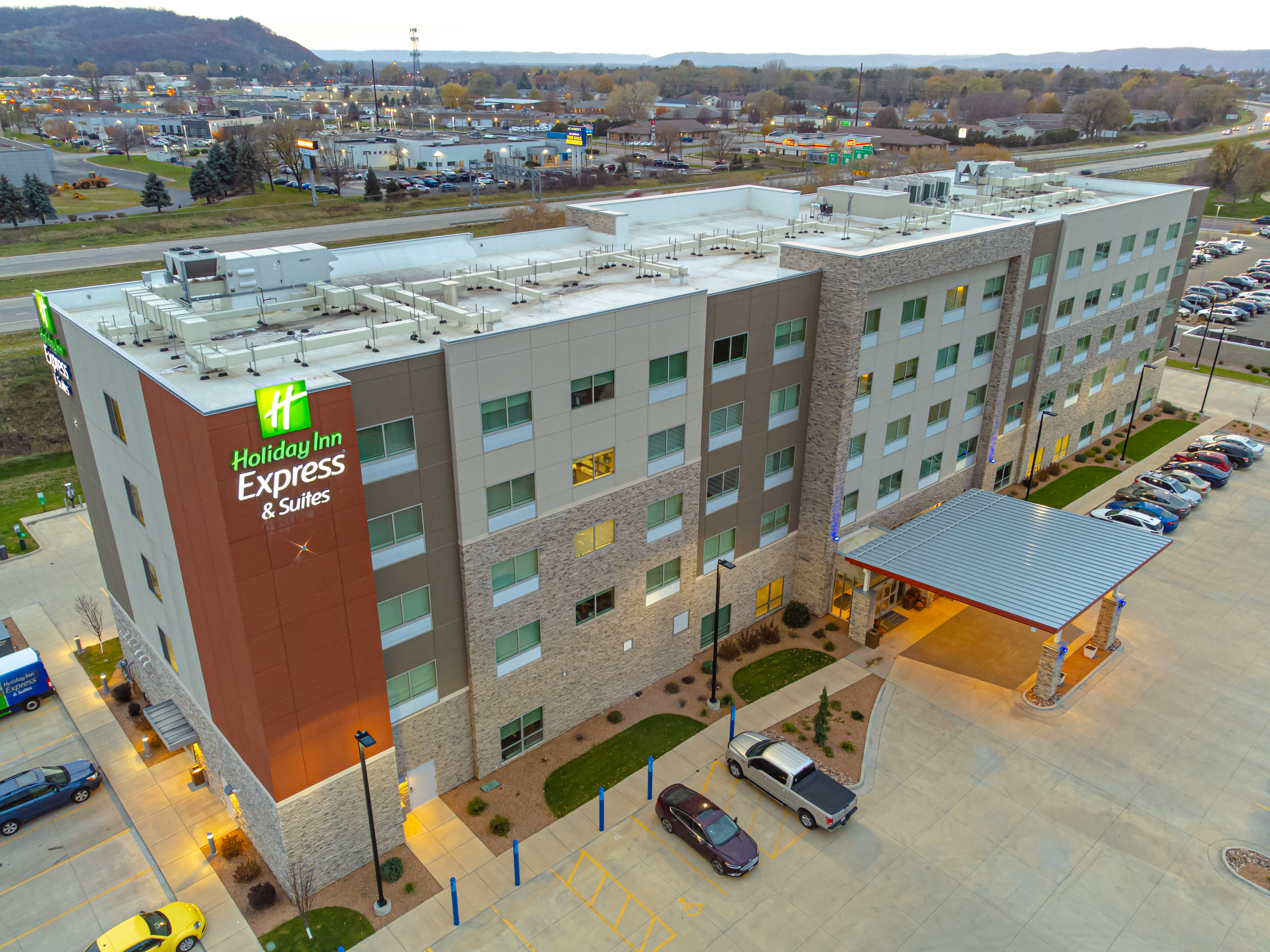
Holiday Inn Express in Onalaska, Wisconsin

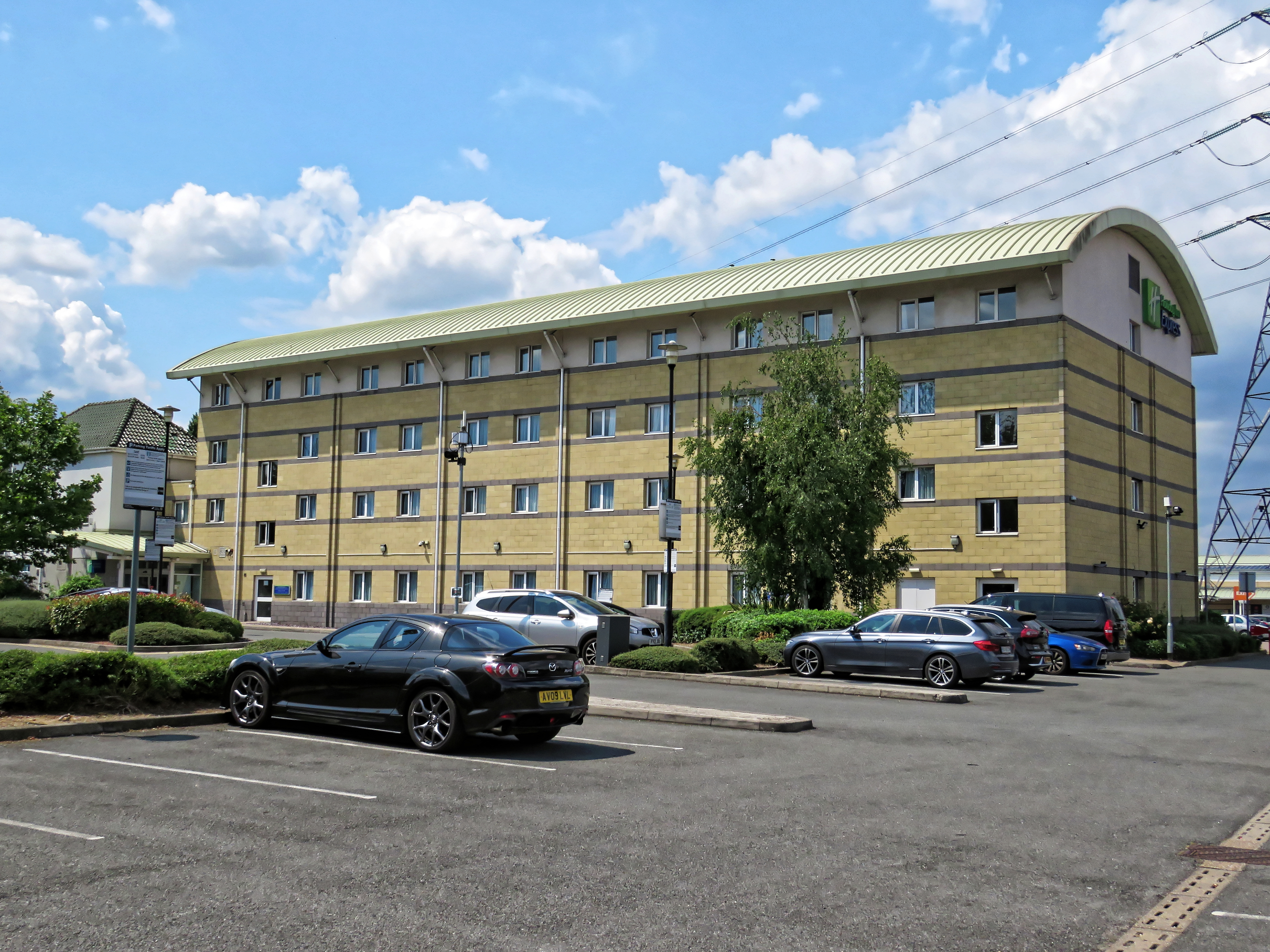
Holiday Inn Express in London

Holiday Inn Express was founded in 1990 under the ownership of Bass. Plans at the time called for 250 locations to be open by 1995. The first three hotels under the Holiday Inn Express name all opened in 1990. These were located in Nashville, Tennessee, Abilene, Texas, and Poughkeepsie, New York. All three were converted from existing Holiday Inn properties.

In 1996, the brand's first European location opened in Scotland.

Starting in 1998, Holiday Inn Express started an ad campaign that featured ordinary people achieving superior feats, such as averting a nuclear disaster or performing like rock stars. When questioned on whether or not they are professionals, they would attribute their skills to their stay there with the reply: "No, but I did stay at a Holiday Inn Express last night!" The commercials originally ended with the tag line "It won't make you smarter. But you'll feel smarter." which was changed to "Stay smart, Stay at Holiday Inn Express." in 2000. The ads were created by Fallon Minneapolis, a unit of the French Publicis Group. These ads have received positive reviews, and have been so successful they have crossed over into popular culture, having been featured in late night comedian jokes and political cartoons. The ad campaign continued to air until 2009. It was revived in 2014 with new ads featuring comedian Jim Gaffigan. In 2015, ads featuring comedian Rob Riggle were produced.

== Properties ==
Typical Holiday Inn Express hotels are built from corporate architectural prototypes, and tend to consist of 60–80 rooms, with a mix of suites and standard rooms in North American properties. Because the chain has been undergoing tremendous growth, the majority of Holiday Inn Express hotels are brand new or newly renovated.

The original Holiday Inn Express properties are considered two-star hotels or no-frills hotels with rooms comparable in quality to those of three-star hotels, but there would be no room service, restaurant, bar, swimming pool, health club, conference and meeting facilities, or other on-site amenities, offering only continental breakfast and an exercise room. Newer Holiday Inn Express locations feature most amenities from the higher-end Holiday Inn brand, such as a restaurant and bar, conference rooms, and even a full fitness center with a swimming pool, making them both three-star hotel chains. The major differentiation between the two brands continues to be location, with Express properties typically found in suburbs and along freeways, while the regular Holiday Inns are placed in urban areas (including downtowns), often near tourist attractions.
