= Evin (disambiguation) =

Evin is a neighbourhood in north Tehran, Iran.

Evin may also refer to:

- Evin (name)
- Evin, East Azerbaijan, a village in Iran
- Évin-Malmaison, a commune in Pas-de-Calais, France
- Eivind or Evin, a Norse name

== See also ==
- Evin Prison, a prison in north Tehran
- Évin Law, a 1991 French alcohol and tobacco policy law, named after Claude Évin
- Evins, a surname
- Evan (disambiguation)
- Even (disambiguation)
- Evon, a given name
