= Evins =

Evins is a surname of Welsh origin, functioning as a variant spelling of the name Evans. Notable people with the surname include:

- Dan Evins (1935–2012), American entrepreneur and founder of Cracker Barrel Old Country Store
- David Evins (1909–1991), American shoe designer
- James Edgar Evins (1883–1954), American politician
- Joe L. Evins (1910–1984), American politician, Democratic U.S. Representative from Tennessee from 1947 to 1977
- John H. Evins (1830–1884), American politician, U.S. Representative from South Carolina

== See also ==
- Evin (disambiguation)
- Evans (disambiguation)
