= Ewens =

Ewens is a surname. Notable people with this surname include:

- Leonard Ewens, Australian politician, mayor of Walkerville
- Maurice Ewens (1611–1687), English Jesuit and author
- Percival Ewens, English cricket player
- Sarah Ewens, Scottish footballer
- Warren Ewens (born 1937), Australian mathematician

== See also ==
- Ewens Ponds, Australia
