= IHG Hotels & Resorts =

British multinational hospitality company

InterContinental Hotels Group PLC
- Trade name: IHG Hotels & Resorts
- Type: Public
- Traded as: LSE: IHG; NYSE: IHG (ADR); FTSE 100 component
- ISIN: GB00BHJYC057
- Industry: Hospitality
- Founded: 15 April 2003; 23 years ago
- Founders: William Bass; Juan Trippe
- Headquarters: Windsor, England, UK
- Number of locations: 7,109 hotels 1,048,731 rooms (2026)
- Area served: Global
- Key people: Deanna Oppenheimer (Chair); Elie Maalouf (CEO)
- Products: Hotels and resorts
- Brands: see Operations
- Revenue: ▲US$5.189 billion (2025)
- Operating income: ▲US$1.198 billion (2025)
- Net income: ▲US$0.759 billion (2025)
- Number of employees: 385,000 (2026)
- Website: ihgplc.com

InterContinental Hotels Group PLC (IHG), marketed as IHG Hotels & Resorts, is a British multinational hospitality company headquartered in Windsor, Berkshire, England. It is listed on the London Stock Exchange and the New York Stock Exchange. It is also a constituent of the FTSE 100 Index.

As of September 2025, the group employs 375,000 people and operates, franchises and leases more than 6,800 hotels globally.

== History ==
=== Bass Hotels ===
The origins of the business may be traced to 1777 when William Bass established the Bass Brewery in Burton-upon-Trent. The company later changed its name to Bass Charrington. Its first entry into the lodging sector came with acquisition of tied public houses. In 1969, it launched the Crest Hotels chain.

In 1988, after the British government limited the number of pubs that brewers could directly own, Bass further invested in the expansion of its hotel business with the purchase of Holiday Inn International from shareholders. Bass sold off the bulk of Crest Hotels in 1990, and the few remaining properties were absorbed into the Holiday Inn chain. Bass expanded its hotel business again in 1998, acquiring the luxury Inter-Continental hotel chain, which had been founded by Juan Trippe, from the Saison Group. The hotel division was then renamed from Holiday Hospitality to Bass Hotels & Resorts, to reflect its expansion beyond the Holiday Inn brand.

Bass changed its name to Six Continents in 2001, after having sold its brewing assets and the Bass name, and Bass Hotels & Resorts became Six Continents Hotels.

=== InterContinental Hotels Group ===
IHG logo from 2017 to 2021

Six Continents announced in October 2002 that it would split itself in two, with one company holding its pubs and restaurants, and the other holding its hotel and soft drink businesses. The split was completed on 15 April 2003, establishing InterContinental Hotels Group (named after the de-hyphenated InterContinental brand) as an independent company, alongside the pub company, Mitchells & Butlers. IHG's hotel portfolio at the time comprised 3,325 properties, primarily under the Holiday Inn, Crowne Plaza, and InterContinental brands. Of those, 190 were owned or leased by the company, with the remainder under management or franchise agreements.

After the separation from Six Continents, IHG began an asset disposal program, selling off hotels to move towards an "asset-light" model focused on franchising and management. From 2003 to 2015, the company sold around 200 hotels for a total of almost $8 billion, leaving only 7 owned or leased properties in the portfolio.

In 2004, IHG acquired the Candlewood Suites brand, a midscale extended stay hotel brand with 108 franchised properties in the United States, for $15 million. IHG divested its soft drink holdings in 2005, selling its 48 percent stake in Britvic for £371 million through an initial public offering.

In 2015, IHG acquired Kimpton Hotels, a boutique hotel brand with 62 managed properties, for $430 million. In February 2021, IHG announced an annual loss of $153 million caused by restrictions related to the COVID-19 pandemic. However, the company expected that the Holiday Inn Express brand would help in the recovery process.

In 2024, IHG signed an expansive cooperation and franchise agreement with German hotel operator Novum Hospitality, rebranding and partially refurbishing all of their current properties (namely the niu, Yggotel, Novum Hotels, Select Hotels and acora living the city) into IHG brands Holiday Inn, Holiday Inn Express, Candlewood Suites and Garner in the upcoming years. This will increase IHG's portfolio in Germany by over 100 hotels.

In 2024, the group reported revenues of $2.3 billion with a $1.1 billion operating profit. Across the same year, it opened 371 new hotels.

In February 2025, IHG acquired the Ruby brand and related intellectual property from Ruby SARL for an initial consideration of £110.5 million. At the time, Ruby operated 20 hotels across major European cities. The brand became IHG's 20th brand and is positioned as a premium lifestyle offering.

In 2025 Onyria Group entered into a new partnership with Intercontinental Hotels Group (IHG). Through a franchise agreement, the two Onyria hotels in Cascais joined the Intercontinental Hotels & Resorts portfolio. This partnership includes an investment of over €5 million for renovation, decoration, and the creation of new spaces. The Onyria Group retains ownership and management of the hotels. The agreement led to the creation of Onyria Marinha Cascais, Vignette Collection, which is already operating in partnership with IHG, and the Kimpton Quinta da Marinha Cascais, that will open in 2026.

== Corporate affairs ==
=== Headquarters ===
The company's worldwide headquarters and European offices are located in Windsor, Berkshire, England. IHG maintains regional offices in Atlanta, Singapore and Shanghai.

=== List of CEOs ===
1. Richard North (2003–2005)
2. Andy Cosslett (2005–2011)
3. Richard Solomons (2011–2017)
4. Keith Barr (2017–2023)
5. Elie W. Maalouf (since July 2023)

== Operations ==
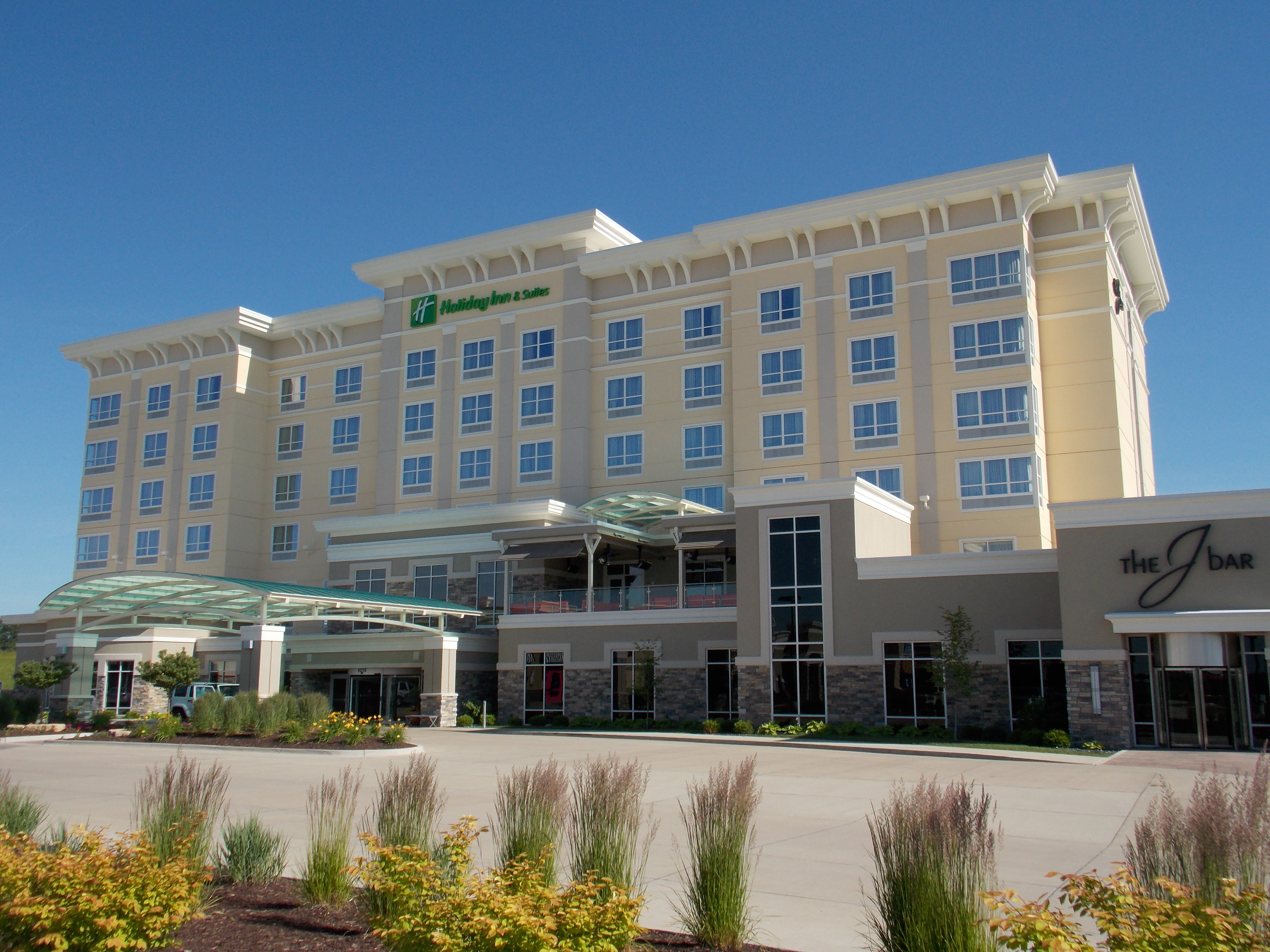
Holiday Inn & Suites in Davenport, Iowa

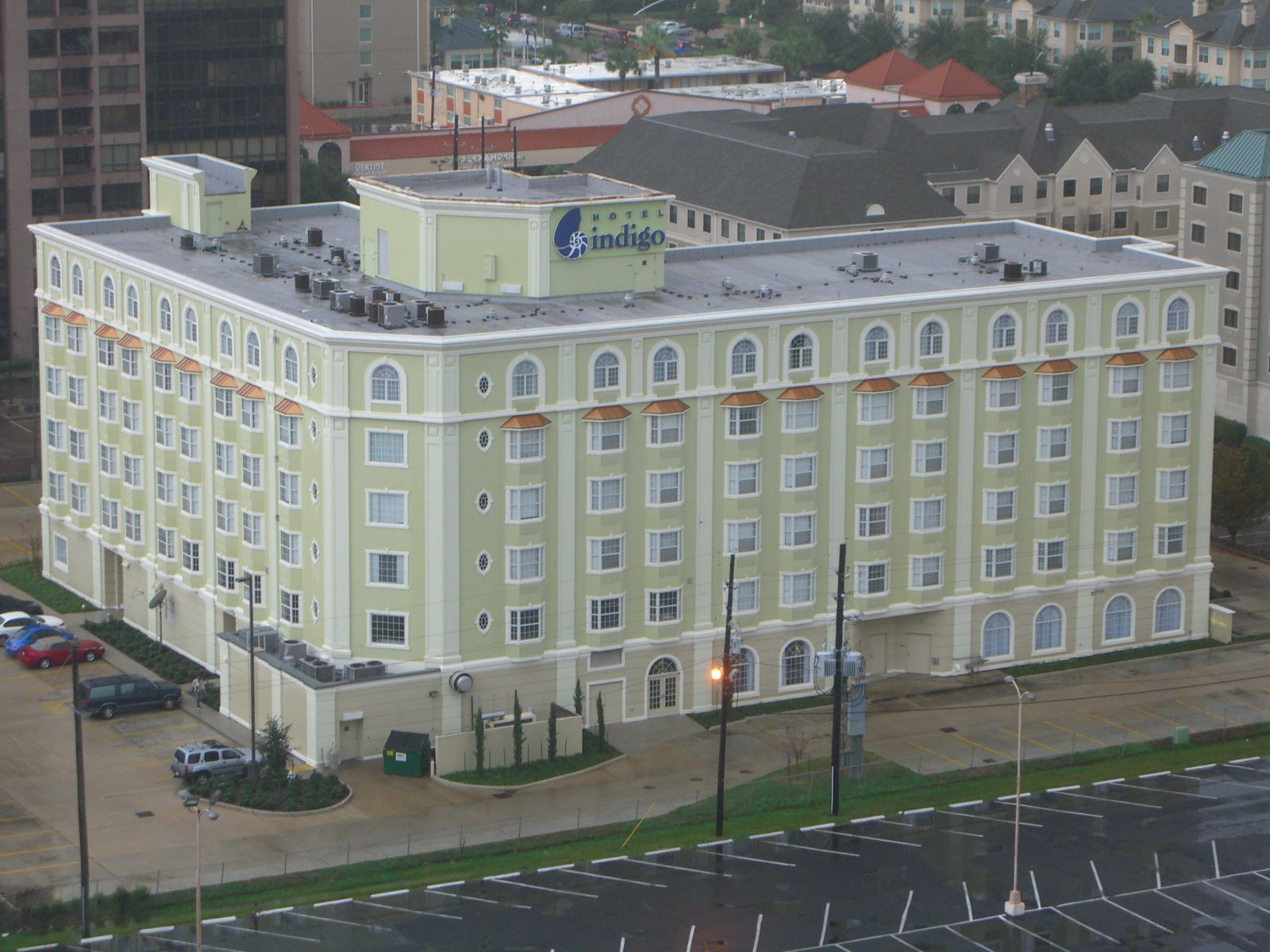
Hotel Indigo in Uptown Houston

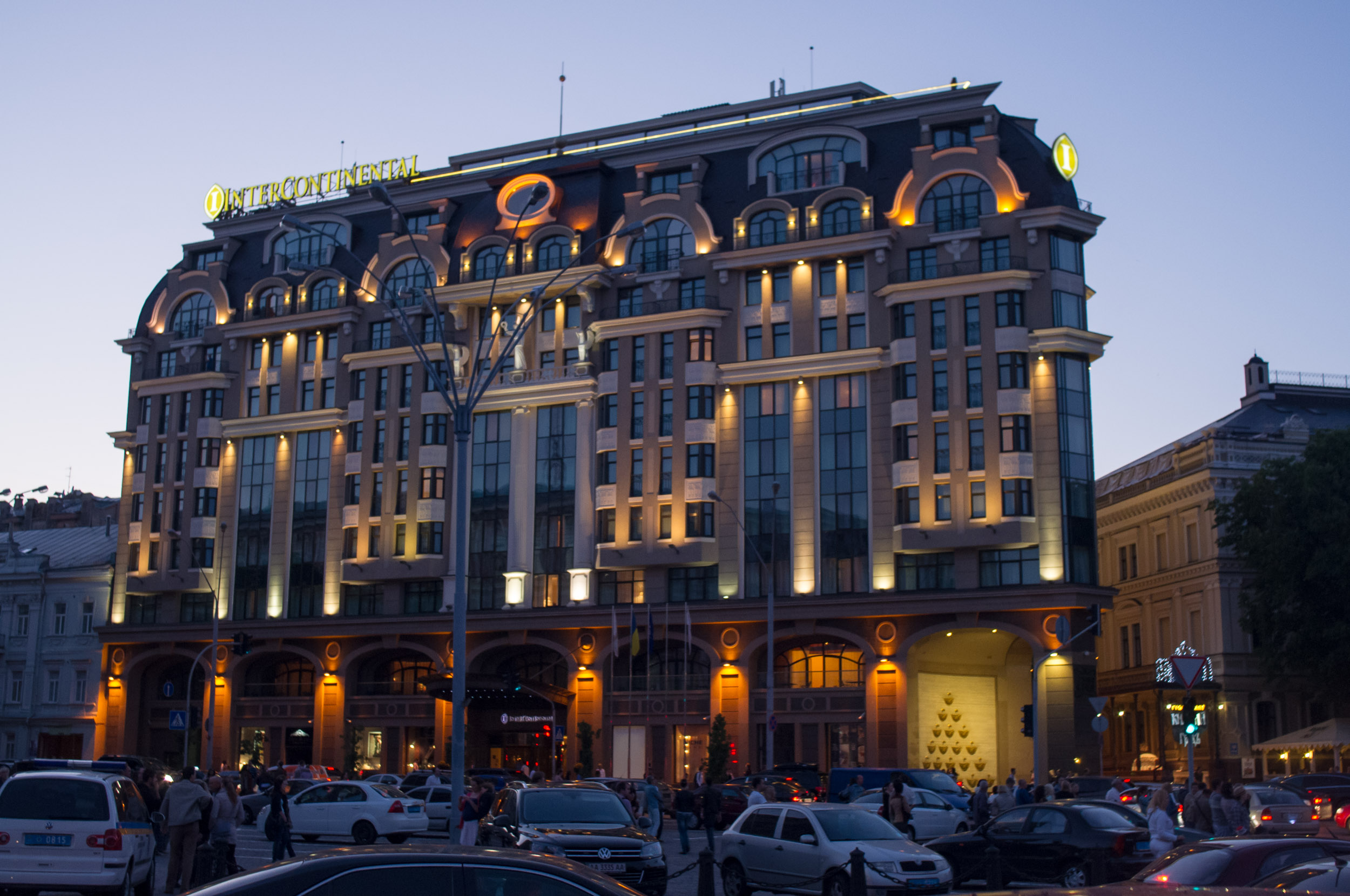
InterContinental in Kyiv

According to the group's 2024 annual report, IHG has almost 6,500 hotels across more than 100 countries under 19 brands marketed across five segments:

Brand	# properties (as of 2024)
Luxury and Lifestyle
Hotel Indigo	169
InterContinental Hotels & Resorts	227
Kimpton Hotels & Restaurants	77
Regent Hotels & Resorts	11
Six Senses	27
Vignette Collection	20
Premium
Crowne Plaza Hotels & Resorts	415
Even Hotels	33
Hualuxe Hotels & Resorts	22
Voco	87
Ruby	16
Essentials
Avid Hotels	76
Holiday Inn	1,249
Garner Hotels	23
Holiday Inn Express	3,237
Suites
Atwell Suites	6
Candlewood Suites	392
Holiday Inn Club Vacations	30
Staybridge Suites	335
Exclusive Partners
Iberostar Beachfront Resorts	55

The group also reports having 2,200 additional properties in the "pipeline".

IHG Hotels & Resorts has a loyalty program which claims over 145 million members, who book 60% of all room nights.

== Criticism ==
In July 2012, the Office of Fair Trading alleged that IHG had broken competition law by preventing online travel agents from discounting the price of room-only hotel accommodations. In February 2014, IHG agreed to end the practice of price fixing.

In May 2012, the UK Advertising Standards Authority (ASA) warned IHG that it must include VAT in its advertised prices. In August 2012, a report by Which? magazine showed that IHG was continuing to violate VAT rules.

In November 2017, London mayor Sadiq Khan accused IHG of failing to fulfil a commitment to pay a living wage.
