= Evans (surname) =

Family name

Origin
- Languages: Welsh, English
- Derivation: Ivan; Eve; Owain
- Meaning: "Son of Evan"; life; God is merciful
- Region of origin: Wales, Cornwall

Evans is a male name and surname of Welsh, and possibly Cornish, origin. Within Wales it is the fifth most common surname and is the tenth most common in England. Within the United States, it is ranked as the 48th-most common surname. In Greece, Evans is used as the English of diminutive from baptismal name Evangelos form (Ευάγγελος).

== Origin ==
A modern variation, is used as a masculine version of the Hebrew name Eve. Though, the traditional name Evans is of Welsh origin. In its anglicised form, the name means "son of Evan". Regarding its Welsh roots, it is a derivative of the name Ifan, a cognate of John. In the Welsh language, the f produces the v sound; Ifan (Ivan) became Evan.

Another school of thought is that ‘Evan’ ( Yvain, Yvainne) is the Latinised Norman-French derivation of ‘Owain’. An example of this is ‘Yvain des Galles’, better known as ‘Owain Llawgoch’ in his native Wales. In the Welsh language the patronymic "ab Evan" resulted in the anglicized surname "Bevan", which is also common in Wales. Evans is a popular name in England, Scotland, Wales, Ireland, United States of America, Canada, and Australia.

The similarity to the Slavic name Ivan is not accidental, as it is also a cognate of John.
