= Avid Hotels =

Franchise based hotel brand

avid hotels by IHG
- Industry: Hotel
- Founded: 2017
- Number of locations: 87 (2026)
- Area served: North America
- Parent: IHG Hotels & Resorts
- Website: avidhotels.com

Avid Hotels by IHG (stylized as avid) is a midscale hotel brand launched in 2017 by IHG Hotels & Resorts.

== History ==
In June 2017, IHG Hotels & Resorts announced the launch of its 13th brand, a new midscale hotel brand. The name, avid hotels, was announced 3 months later in September 2017. Avid Hotels' logo was the first of the group to carry IHG's master brand mark ("An IHG Hotel"). The avid hotels franchise was launched in Canada in December 2017 and in Mexico in February 2018.

The first avid hotel opened in August 2018 in Oklahoma City. Owned by Champion Hotels, it had 87 rooms and opened exactly 199 days after groundbreaking. In October 2018, IHG signed a deal with GS Star GmbH to develop 15 avid hotels in Germany, its first development deal in Europe.

In August 2019, IHG announced the construction of the first avid hotel in Mexico through a partnership with Operadora MBA. As of March 2021, there are 34 locations open and 181 locations in the pipeline. and by March 2026 this had increased to 87 hotels in operation with 7,677 rooms and 117 in the pipeline.

== Concept ==
Avid Hotels is described as a midscale hotel brand. They are built with approximately 100 rooms and have an emphasis on communal spaces. They utilize a bright blue and red color scheme. The hotel does not provide a full hot breakfast, but rather a self-serve mostly cold breakfast including the "Good all round" table that includes granola bars, various pastries, and some drinks. There is a daily selection of a few hot items, such as egg scramble bowls and breakfast sandwiches. There is a "Beverage bar" with an advanced self-service coffee machine that utilizes touch-screen technology, as well as a hot water and still/sparkling water machine; all are open to guests at any time. Some hotels have an indoor or outdoor pool, while all hotels have a fitness room. Rooms are equipped with smart TVs, blackout curtains, a refrigerator, and notably lack an enclosed closet (a countertop and hooks are in its place) and a microwave (a communal microwave is available in the breakfast area). The concept is targeted towards business or casual travelers staying for short periods of time who are looking to save money.
