= Riwon County =

Riwon County 리원군
- County
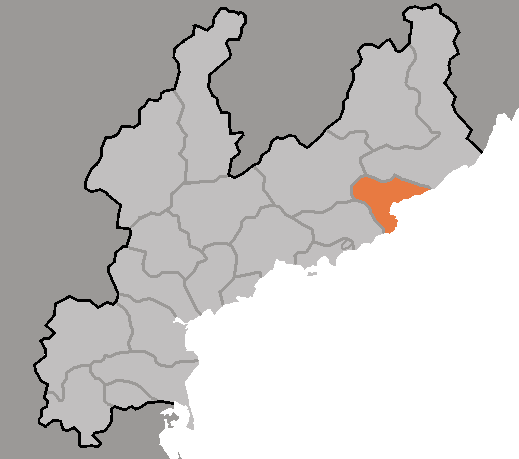
- Map of South Hamgyong showing the location of Riwon
- Coordinates: 40°20′0″N 128°35′0″E
- Country: North Korea
- Province: South Hamgyong Province
- Administrative divisions: 1 ŭp, 3 workers' districts, 21 ri

Area
  - Total: 474.8 km^{2} (183.3 sq mi)

Population (2008)
  - Total: 117,320
  - Density: 247.1/km^{2} (640.0/sq mi)

Riwŏn or Iwon County is a county in South Hamgyŏng province, North Korea. It is located at the province's northeastern tip and borders the Sea of Japan to the southeast.

== Name ==
Riwon County
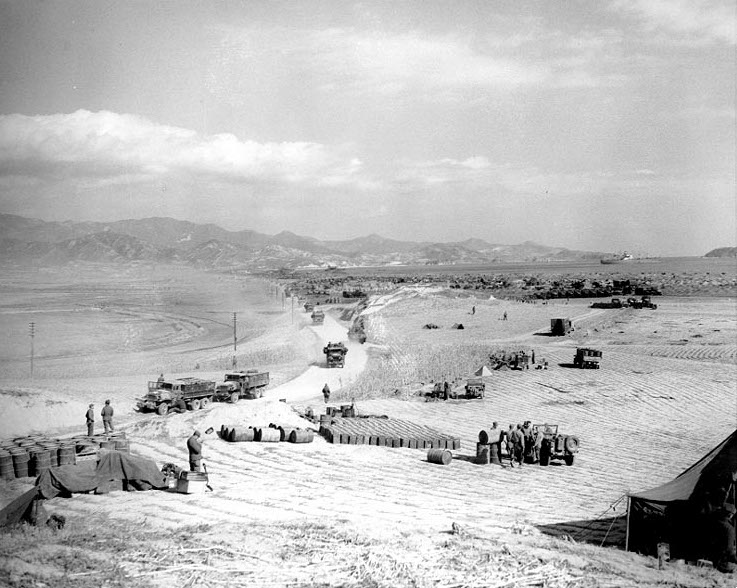
- The US 7th Infantry Division—augmented by South Korean soldiers—landing at Riwon in late 1950.

Korean name
- Hancha: 利原郡

North Korean name
- Chosŏn'gŭl: 리원군
Transcriptions
- Revised Romanization: Riwon-gun
- McCune–Reischauer: Riwŏn-gun

South Korean name
- Hangul: 이원군
Transcriptions
- Revised Romanization: Iwon-gun
- McCune–Reischauer: Iwŏn-gun

"Riwŏn" is the official North Korean romanization of the county's name, using the McCune–Reischauer system. The breve is often omitted. It is named for its seat, Riwon. Due to the silting of the mouth of the Namdae, Riwon was located a little inland by the 1950s, with a larger port named Kunsŏn. The two communities have since merged under the name Riwon. In South Korean sources, the county's name often appears as 이원, now officially romanized as Iwon using Revised Romanization. The MR romanization used before the year 2000 was Iwŏn.

== Physical features ==
Riwŏn is mountainous, although there are also small plains, and is home to the Taedŏk Mountains (대덕산맥). The highest peak is Taedŏksan (1,442 m). There are some 10 significant streams; the chief of these is the Namdaech'ŏn, which drains into the Sea of Japan. There are various bays and islands along the coast. Thanks to its coastal location, the county enjoys a mild maritime climate. Forestland (70% of which is coniferous) takes up 73% of the county's area.

== Administrative divisions ==
Riwŏn county is divided into 1 ŭp (town), 3 rodongjagu (workers' districts) and 21 ri (villages):

- Riwŏn-ŭp
- Ch'aho-rodongjagu
- Hwalsŏng-rodongjagu
- Rahŭng-rodongjagu
- Changch'ung-ri
- Chungp'yŏng-ri
- Ch'ŏngsal-li
- Haksadae-ri
- Hajŏl-li
- Kiam-ri
- Kokch'ang-ri
- Kokku-ri
- Kuŭp-ri
- Kyŏngsŏng-ri
- Mun'am-ri
- P'ung'am-ri
- Ryongpung-ri
- Ryulji-ri
- Songdong-ri
- Sŏnggung-ri
- Songjŏm-ri
- Tabo-ri
- Taedŏng-ri
- Wŏnsa-ri
- Yusŏng-ri

== Economy ==
=== Mining and manufacturing ===
Machine manufacturing dominates the local economy, accounting for half of annual industrial production. Deposits of iron, iron sulfide, talc, limestone, graphite, quartzite and silica are found in the county. The Riwon Mine produces talc.

=== Agriculture ===
Agriculture is carried out in the plains and along the streams; major crops include rice, soybeans and maize.

== Transport ==
Riwŏn is served by roads, and by the P'yŏngra line of the Korean State Railway.

== See also ==
- Geography of North Korea
- Administrative divisions of North Korea
