= Even Hotels =

US hotel brand

EVEN Hotels by IHG
- Type: Subsidiary
- Industry: Hotel
- Founded: 2012
- Number of locations: 33 (September 2024)
- Area served: North America
- Parent: InterContinental Hotels Group
- Website: evenhotels.com

Even Hotels by IHG (styled EVEN Hotels) is a hotel brand launched in 2012 by InterContinental Hotels Group with an emphasis on "wellness". As of September 2024, there were 33 hotels.

== Timeline ==
The company had aimed to roll out the new hotel brand initially in North America with a target of 100 hotels in five years, with the first opening in June 2014 in Norwalk, Connecticut, with a 129-room hotel. but as of June 2021, there were 20 open hotels, though 30 additional hotels are "in the pipeline".

In 2014, additional hotels opened in Rockville, Maryland, with three more locations in New York that opened in 2015; a 150-room new build in the Garment District and the flagship 230-room tower near Grand Central Terminal, and a 204-room property in Brooklyn, New York, that opened in 2015. In 2016 a 132-room new built hotel was opened in Omaha, Nebraska.
