= Evens (disambiguation) =

The Evens are an ethnic group of Siberia and the Russia Far East.

Evens may also refer to:

- Even numbers
- Even odds (or 'evens'), when a bet will pay out one unit per unit wagered in the event of it winning
- The Evens, Washington, DC, punk duo
  - The Evens (album), their self-titled debut album

People with the surname Evens include:

- Bernt Evens (born 1978), Belgian footballer
- Bob Evens (born 1947), English Anglican churchman
- George Bramwell Evens (1884–1943), British radio broadcaster

People with the given name Evens include:

- Evens Julmis, Bahamian FIFA football referee

== See also ==
- Even (disambiguation)
- Evans (disambiguation)
- Evens & Howard Fire Brick Co. of St. Louis, Missouri, United States
