= Refuge des Évettes =

Coordinates: 45°22′6.5″N 7°6′26.5″E

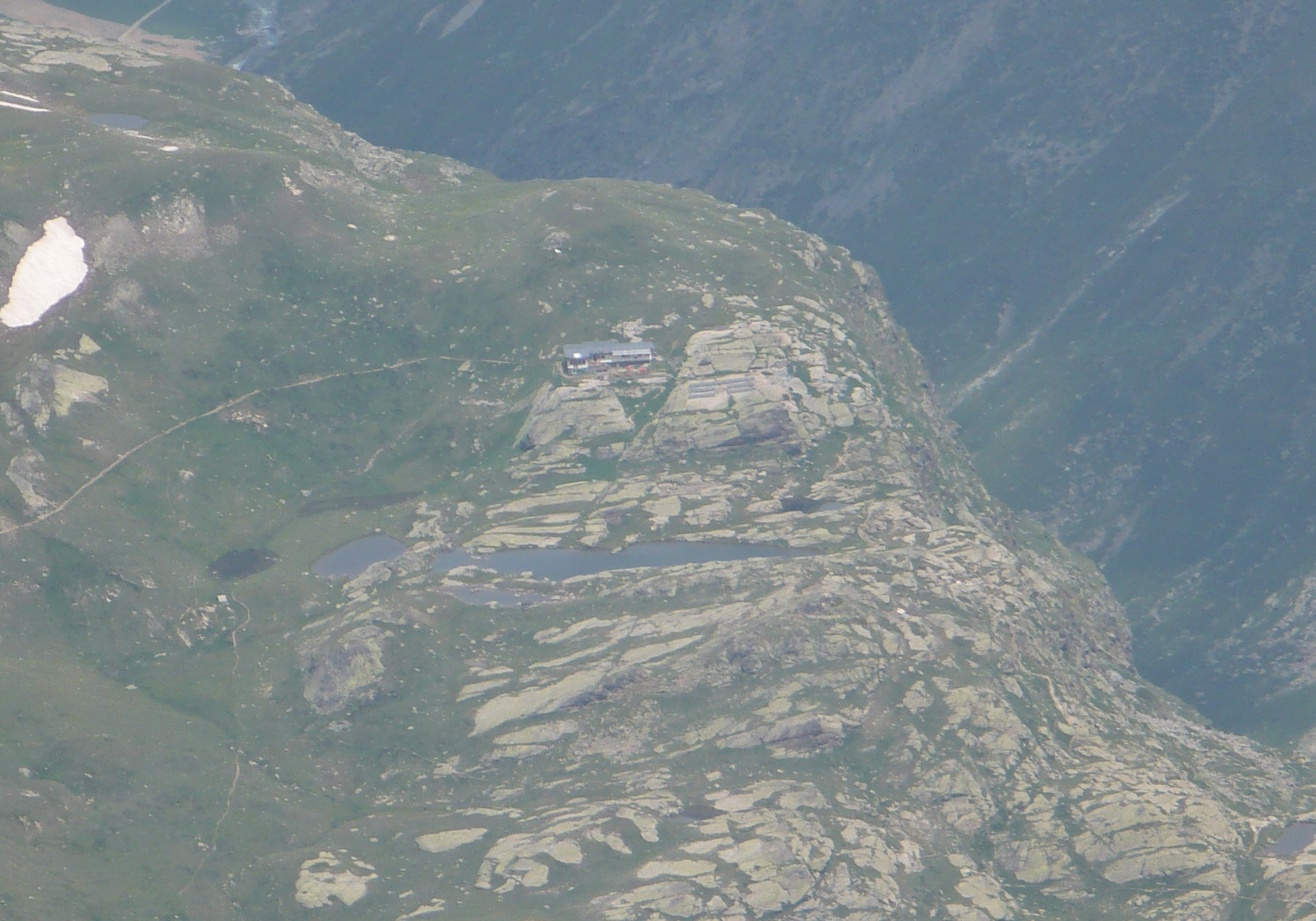
Rifugio des Evettes

Refuge des Évettes is a refuge in the Alps.
