= Ivonne =

- Gender: Female

Origin
- Origin: Spanish, French
- Meaning: young archer, yew

Other names
- Related names: Yvonne

Ivonne is a Spanish female name derived from the French name Yvonne.

== People ==
- Ivonne Belen (born 1955), Puerto Rican movie director and producer
- Ivonne Coll (born 1947), Puerto Rican actress
- Ivonne Harrison (born 1975), Puerto Rican track and field runner
- Ivonne Higuero, Panamanian-American government official
- Ivonne Leal (born 1966), Cuban javelin thrower
- Ivonne Montero (born 1974), Mexican actress, model and singer
- Ivonne Ortega Pacheco (born 1972), Mexican politician
- Ivonne Teichmann (born 1977), German athlete
- Ivonne Young (1943–2025), Panamanian politician
