= Yvonne J. Huang =

American pulmonologist and physician-scientist

- Education: Stanford University (BS); University of Alabama School of Medicine (MD); Yale University (residency); University of California, San Francisco (fellowship)
- Known for: Research on the microbiome in asthma and COPD
- Awards: Young Physician-Scientist Award (American Society for Clinical Investigation, 2016); Jo Rae Wright Award for Outstanding Science (American Thoracic Society, 2019); Mid-Career Award, Assembly on Allergy, Immunology and Inflammation (American Thoracic Society, 2025)
- Scientific career
- Fields: Pulmonology, Microbiome research
- Workplaces: University of Wisconsin–Madison; University of Michigan; University of California, San Francisco

Yvonne J. Huang is an American pulmonologist and physician-scientist. Her research focuses on studies of host-microbiome interactions in asthma and chronic obstructive pulmonary disease (COPD) and their impact on disease heterogeneity. Since March 2026 she has been chief of the Division of Allergy, Pulmonary and Critical Care Medicine in the Department of Medicine at the University of Wisconsin-Madison.

== Education and career ==
Huang received a Bachelor of Science in biological sciences from Stanford University (1993–1997) and an MD from the University of Alabama School of Medicine (1997–2001). She completed residency training in internal medicine at Yale New Haven Hospital (2001–2004) and a fellowship in pulmonary and critical care medicine at the University of California, San Francisco (2005–2008), followed by postdoctoral training in microbial ecology.

She previously held joint faculty appointments in the Departments of Internal Medicine (Pulmonary and Critical Care Medicine) and Microbiology and Immunology at the University of Michigan (2014–2026). In March 2026 she joined the University of Wisconsin-Madison as division chief.

Huang has served on numerous national committees, including for the National Institutes of Health and the National Academies of Sciences, Engineering, and Medicine.

== Research ==
Huang's work examines relationships between the microbiome (airway or gut), clinical and biologic features of asthma and COPD, and treatment responses. She has led numerous studies, including multi-center investigations, of adults with asthma or COPD to understand microbiome differences that influence heterogeneity in disease outcomes. Studies have used culture-independent methods and multi-omic analyses (including metagenomics, meta-transcriptomics, and metabolomics) of samples from patient cohorts. Her laboratory has also pursued microbial cultivation studies using bacterial strains recovered from airway samples of patients.

In a 2011 study, bronchial bacterial community composition and diversity were found to correlate with the degree of bronchial hyperresponsiveness in adults with suboptimally controlled asthma. This work was among the early reports linking airway microbiota composition to a key clinical feature of asthma.

A 2015 study identified associations between the bronchial microbiome and disease features in patients with severe asthma, including an inverse relationship between bronchial bacterial burden and biomarkers of allergic (type 2 inflammation) such as tissue eosinophils. Links between bronchial microbiota composition and epithelial gene expression signatures were also observed. Subsequent work examined the effects of inhaled corticosteroids on the airway microbiome. In a randomized, placebo-controlled study of patients with or without mild asthma, baseline microbiome differences were associated with clinical response to inhaled steroid treatment, and changes in the microbiome were observed with steroid use.

Additional studies have described airway microbiome changes during exacerbations of COPD. Later work has associated airway microbiome characteristics with measures of COPD severity, including symptom burden, radiographic markers of airway disease, and lung function. Multi-omic analyses have identified lung metabolomic features that correlate with microbiome findings in milder-stage COPD.

== Awards and honors ==
- 2016 - Young Physician-Scientist Award, American Society for Clinical Investigation
- 2017 - Science and Innovation Center Rising Star in Research Award, American Thoracic Society
- 2019 - Jo Rae Wright Award for Outstanding Science, American Thoracic Society
- 2020 - Fellow of the American Thoracic Society (ATSF)
- 2023 - Fellow of the American Academy of Allergy, Asthma, and Immunology (FAAAAI)
- 2023 - Distinguished Clinical and Translational Research Mentor Award, Michigan Institute for Clinical and Health Research (MICHR)
- 2025 - Mid-Career Award, Assembly on Allergy, Immunology and Inflammation, American Thoracic Society
