= Ivonne Young =

Panamanian politician (1943–2025)

Minister of the Presidency
- In office 1 September 1999 – 31 August 2004

Personal details
- Born: 1943
- Died: 30 July 2025 (aged 81–82)

Ivonne Young (1943 – 30 July 2025) was a Panamanian politician. She served as Minister of the Presidency from 1999 to 2004.
