= Yvon (surname) =

Yvon is a surname. Notable people with the surname include:

- Adolphe Yvon (1817–1893), French painter
- Carlo Yvon (1798–1854), Italian composer, oboist, and English horn player
- Claude Yvon (1714–1791), French encyclopedist
- Dominique Yvon (born 1968), French ice dancer
- George Yvon (1887–1957), British diver
