= Hovin, Iran =

Hovin هوين
- Village
- Location within Iran
- Coordinates: 38°59′37″N 47°21′29″E
- Country: Iran
- Province: East Azerbaijan
- County: Ahar
- Bakhsh: Hurand
- Rural District: Chahardangeh

Population (2006)
  - Total: 98
- Time zone: UTC+3:30 (IRST)
  - Summer (DST): UTC+4:30 (IRDT)

Hovin (Persian: هوين, also Romanized as Hovīn; also known as Evīn) is a village in Chahardangeh Rural District, Hurand District, Ahar County, East Azerbaijan Province, Iran. At the 2006 census, its population was 98, in 18 families.
