= Even (surname) =

Even is a surname. Notable people with the surname include:

- Avraham Even-Shoshan (1906–1984), Russian-Israeli Hebrew linguist and lexicographer
- Johannes Even (1903–1964), German politician
- Matan Even (born 2007), comedian and internet personality
- Maya Even (born 1958), Canadian-born British lecturer, journalist and television presenter
- Nahshon Even-Chaim (born 1971), first major computer hacker convicted in Australia
- Pierre Even (composer) (born 1946), Luxembourgish composer
- Pierre Even (producer), Canadian film producer
- Shimon Even (1935–2004), Israeli computer science researcher
- Uzi Even (born 1940), Israeli professor of chemistry and politician

== See also ==
- Even (given name)
- Even (disambiguation)
