= Ewins =

Surname list

Ewins is a surname. Notable people with the surname include:

- Brett Ewins (1955–2015), a British comic book artist
- David Ewins (1942–2023), a British mechanical engineer
- Mat Ewins, a British actor, writer, and stand-up comedian

== See also ==
- Ewin
- Ewing (surname)
