= Yvonne Musarurwa =

Zimbabwean politician and political rights activist (born 23 December 1986)

Yvonne Musarurwa is a Zimbabwean politician and political rights activist. She is Proportional Representative Member of Parliament and the current National Youth Chairperson of the Movement for Democratic Change Alliance. She is also the chairperson of Environment, Tourism and Climate portfolio of the parliament of Zimbabwe

== Career background ==
Yvonne Musarurwa was born on 23 December 1986 in Harare, Zimbabwe. She grew up in the Budiriro suburb of Harare where she began her political career whilst in high school. During high school, she became known in 2003 when she instigated one of the largest high school demonstrations at Mufakose High 1 School which was inspired by the MDC party Final Push demonstrations, she then mobilised the demonstration against the school's headmaster David Paul Makanza which resulted in his dismissal by the Ministry of Higher and Primary Education.

In 2005, Musarurwa joined the Movement for Democratic Change which was formed by Morgan Tsvangirai and was appointed Ward Chairperson for Youth in Budiriro constituency. In 2008 she became the party's gender rights representative for Harare district then in 2011 she was raised to provincial representative then was appointed national representative before her arrest.

In 2011, Yvonne Musarurwa was arrested for the murder of Zimbabwe Republic Police inspector Petros Mutedzi during an MDC-T rally in Glen View, Harare on 28 May 2011 along with other party members. She was released in 2014 on bail then in December 2016, she was convicted of the murder charge and was sentenced to 20 years in prison with two other members. She was released in March 2018 under a Presidential Amnesty granted to 3,000 other prisoners.

After being freed, in 2018 she was appointed National Organising Secretary for the MDC-T which was led by Thokozani Khupe. When MDC-T split in 2020, she joined the one that was led by Douglas Mwonzora and was appointed National Chairperson for Youth Affairs. In 2021 she arrested over allegations of assaulting party vice President Thokozani Khupe's aide Kudzanai Mashumba then was ruled not guilty in June same year four weeks after the incident. She started an initiative with Tungamirai Madzokere and Last Maengahama that advocates for prisoners' right to vote in Zimbabwean prisons, their plea was admitted in the high court in 2022 after their application had been on standby since 2017.
