= Yvon Repérant =

French harpsichordist and organist

Yvon Repérant is a French harpsichordist and organist, singing leader and musicologist.

Yvon Repérant studied at the Schola Cantorum Basiliensis and the Conservatoire National Supérieur de Musique et de Danse, Paris. He was the lead continuo player for Les Arts Florissants from 1979, the date of the founding of the ensemble, till the famous 1987 production of Lully's Atys at the Opéra Comique. As continuo player he appeared on many of the first generation of baroque recordings, including Atys, Michel Lambert Airs de cour, M.-A. Charpentier Antiennes "O" de l'Avent, Monteverdi's Selva morale e spirituale etc. He also worked as artistic director in baroque opera productions, for René Jacobs and others, and continues to perform as accompanist to recitals.
