= Verušičky =

- Municipality
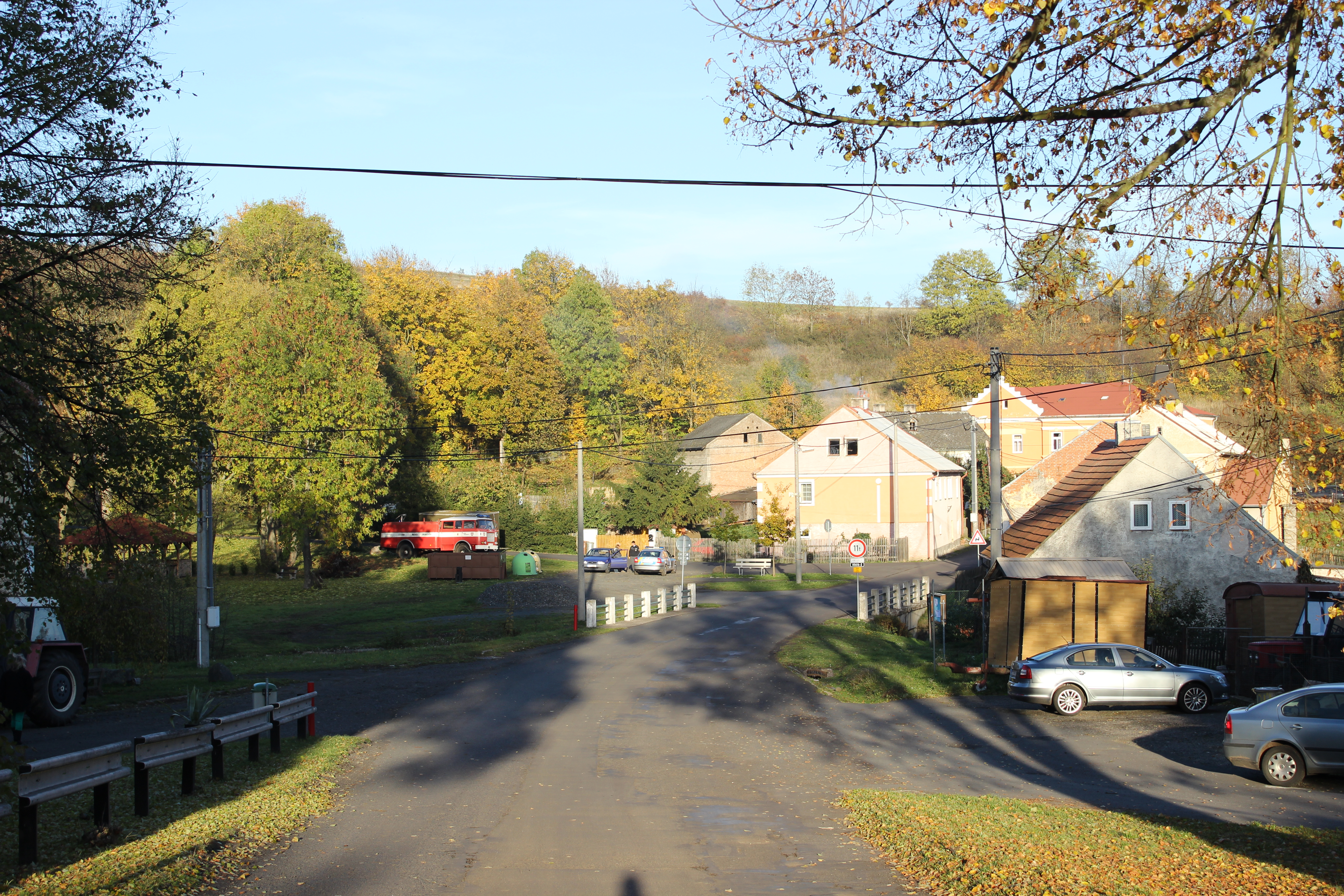
- Luka, a part of Verušičky

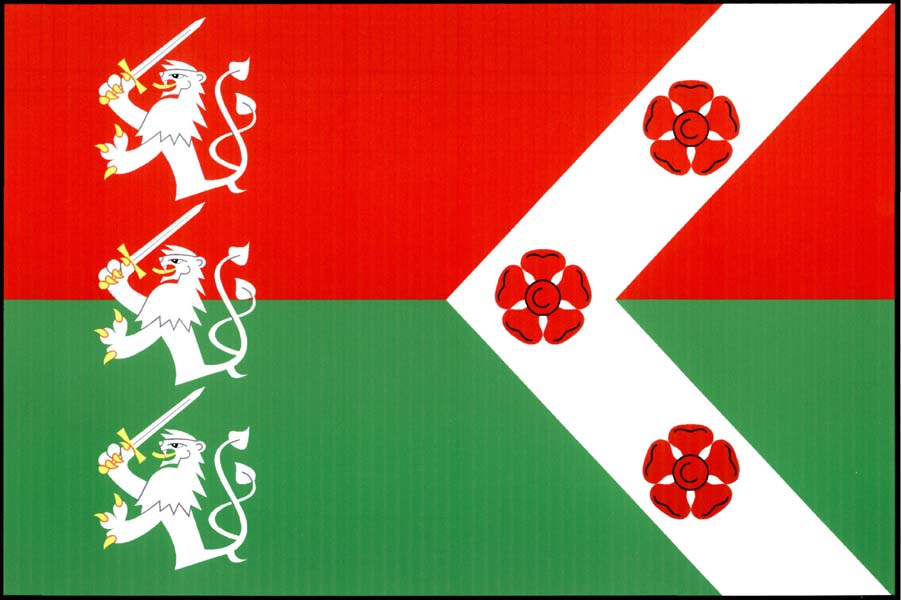
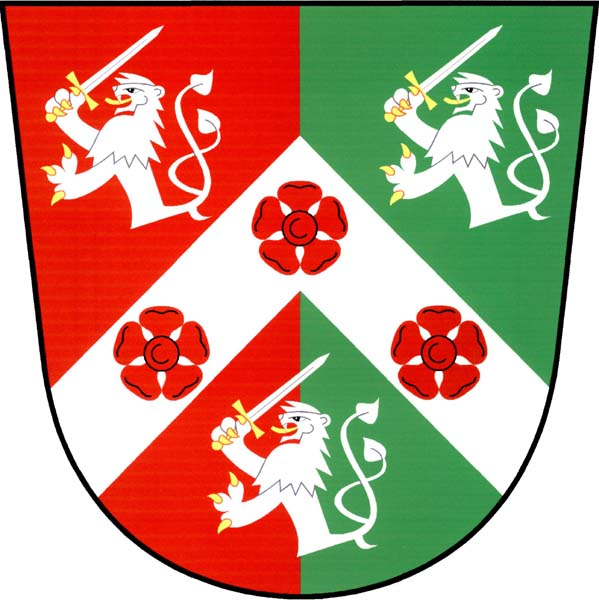
- Flag Coat of arms

- Location in the Czech Republic
- Coordinates: 50°8′30″N 13°10′28″E
- Country: Czech Republic
- Region: Karlovy Vary
- District: Karlovy Vary
- First mentioned: 1556

Area
  - Total: 24.78 km^{2} (9.57 sq mi)
- Elevation: 574 m (1,883 ft)

Population (2026-01-01)
  - Total: 456
  - Density: 18.4/km^{2} (47.7/sq mi)
- Time zone: UTC+1 (CET)
  - Summer (DST): UTC+2 (CEST)
- Postal code: 364 52
- Website: www.obecverusicky.cz

Verušičky (German: Klein Werscheditz) is a municipality and village in Karlovy Vary District in the Karlovy Vary Region of the Czech Republic. It has about 500 inhabitants.

== Administrative division ==
Verušičky consists of nine municipal parts (in brackets population according to the 2021 census):

- Verušičky (181)
- Albeřice (98)
- Budov (22)
- Hřivínov (4)
- Luka (59)
- Malý Hlavákov (15)
- Týniště (37)
- Vahaneč (24)
- Záhoří (8)

== Etymology ==
The name Verušičky is a diminutive of Verušice (today a part of Žlutice). The names of both these villages were derived from the personal name Veruš.

== Geography ==
Verušičky is located about 23 kilometres (14 mi) southeast of Karlovy Vary. It lies mostly in the Doupov Mountains, only the western part of the municipal territory extends into the Teplá Highlands. The highest point is the hill Janský vrch at 717 m (2,352 ft) above sea level.

== History ==
The first written mention of Verušičky is from 1556, when there was a fortress. The most important owners of the village were the families of Schlick (1705–1708), Breidenbach (1758–1775) and Nostitz (1775–1799).

== Demographics ==
Historical population

Year	Pop.	±%
1869	2,283	—
1880	2,110	−7.6%
1890	1,929	−8.6%
1900	1,847	−4.3%
1910	1,814	−1.8%

Year	Pop.	±%
1921	1,757	−3.1%
1930	1,686	−4.0%
1950	650	−61.4%
1961	476	−26.8%
1970	362	−23.9%

Year	Pop.	±%
1980	350	−3.3%
1991	327	−6.6%
2001	480	+46.8%
2011	474	−1.2%
2021	448	−5.5%

Source: Censuses

== Transport ==
The I/6 road (which replaces the incomplete section of the D6 motorway from Prague to Karlovy Vary; part of the European route E48) runs through the municipality.

== Sights ==
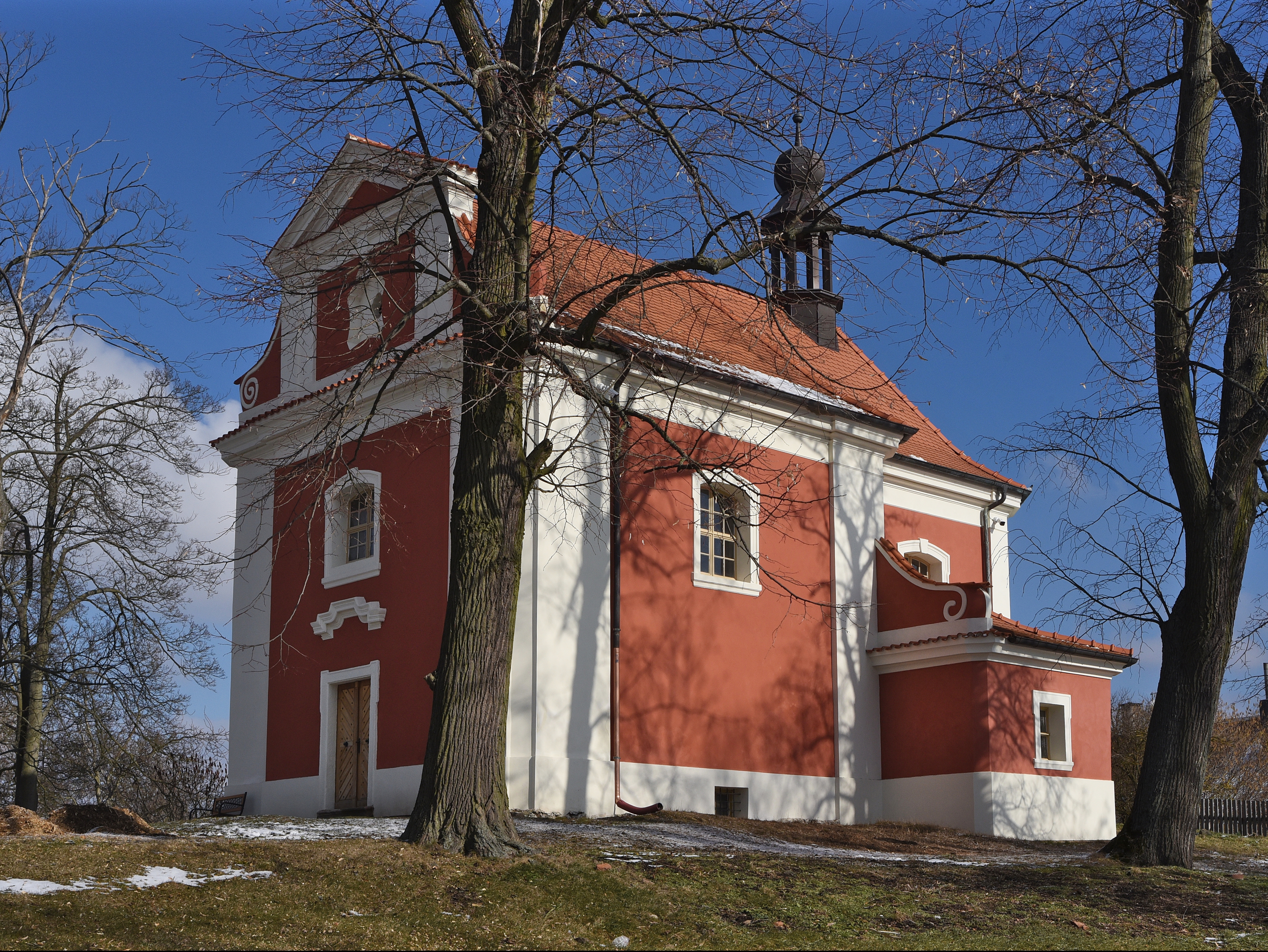
Church of the Holy Trinity

The main landmark of the Verušičky is the Church of the Holy Trinity. It is a valuable rural Baroque building. It dates from the early 18th century.

The Verušičky Castle was a Renaissance fortress, which was converted into a Baroque castle at the beginning of the 18th century. At the end of the 19th century, it was reconstructed in the pseudo-Gothic style. Today the castle is dilapidated and unused.
