= Percival Ewens =

English cricketer

Personal information
- Full name: Percival Charles Ewens
- Born: 23 November 1882; Yeovil, Somerset, England
- Died: 21 July 1961 (aged 78); Galmington, Taunton, Somerset, England
- Batting: Right-handed

Domestic team information
- Years: Team
- 1923–1926: Somerset

Career statistics
Competition	FC
Matches	7
Runs scored	114
Batting average	16.28
100s/50s	0/0
Top score	27
Catches/stumpings	3/–
- Source: CricketArchive, 22 December 2015

Percival Charles Ewens played seven first-class cricket matches for Somerset between 1923 and 1926 as a right-handed batsman, batting mostly well down the lower order. He did not make his first appearance until he was over the age of 40, and all his first-class cricket appearances were in away matches.

Ewens, born at Yeovil, Somerset on 23 November 1882, made his debut for Somerset in a low-scoring match at Chesterfield against Derbyshire in July 1923, batting at No 10 in each innings and being not out both times. He played in Somerset's next match, at Maidstone against Kent, batting at No 5 in the first innings, but then again at No 10 in the second innings, when he reached double figures for the first time in first-class cricket.

Ewens next appeared for Somerset in 1925 in a single match against Sussex, in which, batting at No 8, he made his highest score to date, 24. And then in 1926, he made four mostly lower order appearances in away matches, in one of which, against Middlesex at Lord's, he made his highest first-class score of 27. He did not bowl in any of the seven matches.

He died at Galmington, Somerset, on 21 July 1961.
