= Riwŏn =

Riwon 리원읍
- Town
- Location within North Korea
- Country: North Korea
- Province: South Hamgyŏng
- County: Riwŏn County

Riwŏn is the seat of Riwŏn County in South Hamgyŏng province, North Korea.

== Name ==
Riwŏn
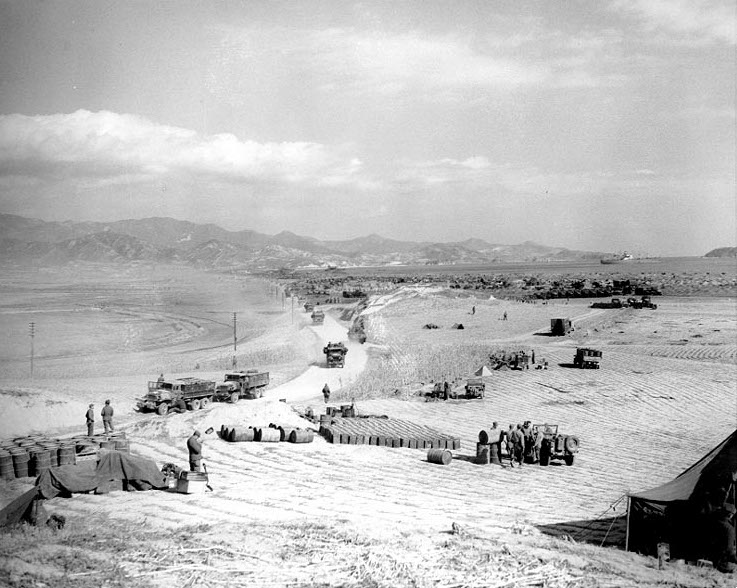
- The US 7th Infantry Division—augmented by South Korean soldiers—landing at Riwon in late 1950.

Korean name
- Hancha: 利原邑
- Literal meaning: Successful Plain

North Korean name
- Chosŏn'gŭl: 리원읍
Transcriptions
- Revised Romanization: Riwon-eup
- McCune–Reischauer: Riwŏn-ŭp

South Korean name
- Hangul: 이원읍
Transcriptions
- Revised Romanization: Iwon-eup
- McCune–Reischauer: Iwŏn-ŭp

"Riwŏn" is the official North Korean romanization of the town's name, using the McCune–Reischauer system. The breve is often omitted. Due to the silting of the mouth of the Namdae, Riwon was located a little inland by the 1950s, with a larger port named Kunsŏn. The two communities have since merged under the name Riwon. In South Korean sources, the town's name often appears as 이원, now officially romanized as Iwon using Revised Romanization. The MR romanization used before the year 2000 was Iwŏn.

== Geography ==
Present-day Riwon lies a little northeast of the mouth of the Namdae River on the north shore of Riwon Bay, an inlet of the Sea of Japan's East Korean Bay.

== History ==
During Japan's 16th-century invasion of Korea, Katō Kiyomasa led its northeastern campaign. The Righteous Army of Chŏng Munbu recaptured Riwon on the 12th day of the 11th lunar month of 1592.

As part of Operation Tailboard during the initial phase of the Korean War, the US Marines' 1st Division landed at Wonsan on October 25, 1950. Finding little opposition, Gen. Almond flew along the coast to find an advanced spot to land the US Army's 7th Infantry Division and settled on the beaches at Riwon. The 7th Division's 17th RCT began landing unopposed on October 29. Tanks and tractors were used to pull vehicles ashore across the beaches' loose sand until the 2nd ESB was able to bulldoze landing ramps, hiring local labor and purchasing timber and rice-straw sacks from local businesses. The majority of the division was landed by November 8 and began advancing north towards the Chinese border at the Yalu. The involvement of China's regular army in the war forced their retreat over the course of the next month.

== Economy ==
Present-day Riwon is mostly a fishing center. The economy is also supplemented by local members of North Korea's navy. It has paved roads and is connected to the P'yŏngra line of the North Korean rail system. A separate railway (리원선) connects it with Chaho to the south.
