= WONA =

WONA may refer to:

- WONA-FM, a radio station (95.1 FM) licensed to serve Vaiden, Mississippi, United States
- WLEE-FM, a radio station (95.1 FM) licensed to serve Winona, Mississippi, which held the call sign WONA-FM from 1976 to 2018
- WULT, a radio station (1540 AM) licensed to serve Richmond, Virginia, United States, which held the call sign WONA from 2016 to 2017
- WLEE (AM), a radio station (1570 AM) licensed to serve Winona, Mississippi, which held the call sign WONA from 1958 to 2016

== See also ==
- "Wona", a 2016 song by Mumford & Sons
