= Lac des Évettes =

Lake in France

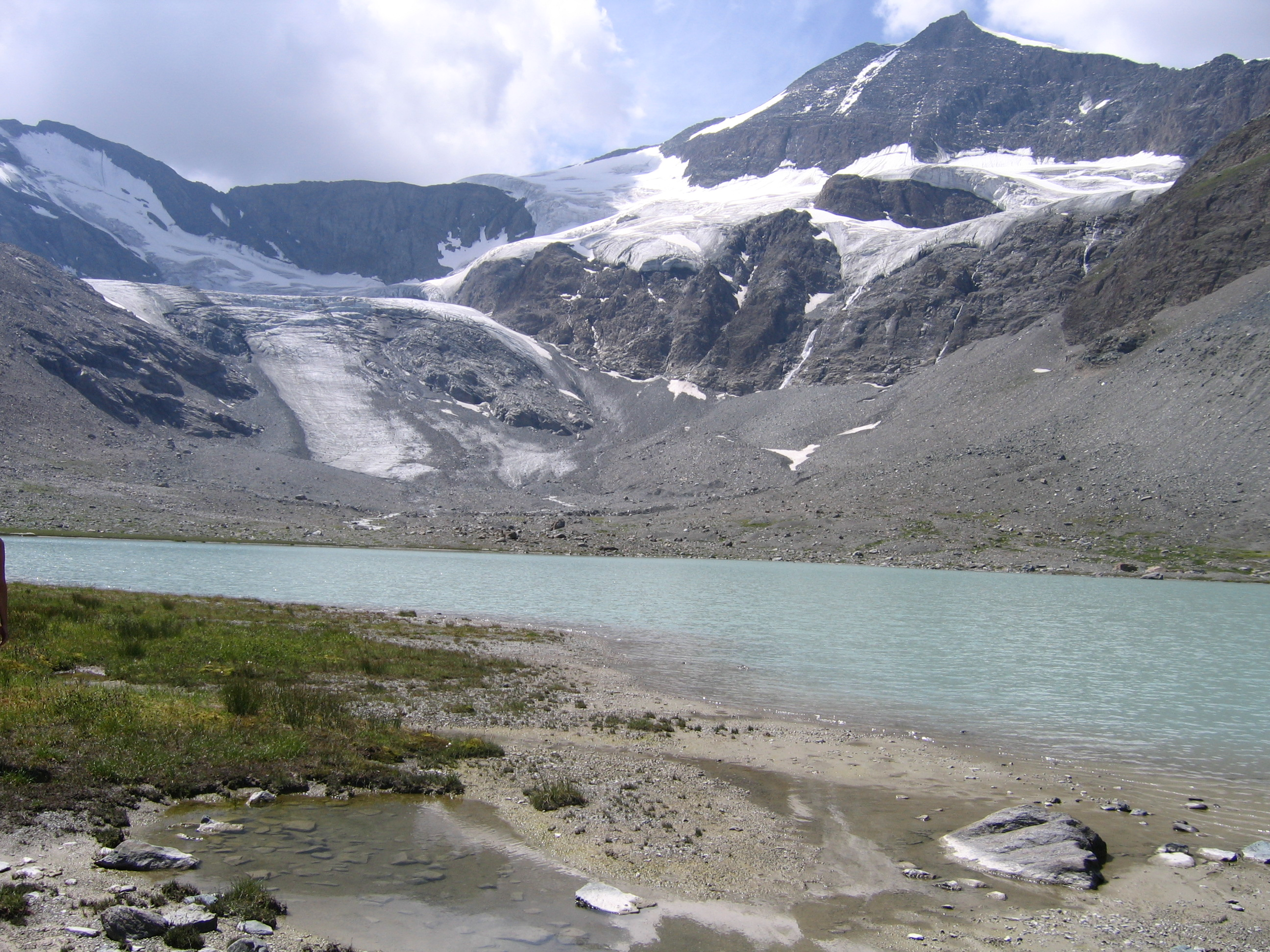

- Location within Savoie
- Location: Bonneval-sur-Arc, Savoie
- Coordinates: 45°21′17″N 7°6′56″E
- Basin countries: France
- Surface area: 3 ha (7.4 acres)

Lac des Évettes is a lake in the Vanoise Massif of the Savoie department of France. The lake formed between 1939 and 1949, after the glacier that covered the area melted. Today the glacier ends almost 1 km from the lake's shore.
