= Yvon (given name) =

Yvon is a masculine given name. Notable people with the name include:

- Yvon Beaulne (1919–1999), Canadian diplomat
- Yvon Dumont (born 1951), Canadian politician
- Yvon Barrette (21st century), Canadian actor
- Yvon Bertin (born 1953), French cyclist
- Yvon Bilodeau (born 1951), Canadian ice hockey player
- Yvon Bonenfant (21st century), Canadian politician
- Yvon Brochu (born 1944), Canadian politician
- Yvon Charbonneau (1940–2016), Canadian politician
- Yvon Chouinard (born 1938), American mountain climber
- Yvon Collin (born 1944), French politician
- Yvon Cormier (1938–2009), Canadian professional wrestler
- Yvon Corriveau (born 1967), Canadian ice hockey player
- Yvon Côté (born 1939), Canadian politician
- Yvon Delbos (1885–1956), French politician
- Yvon Deschamps (born 1935), Canadian author
- Yvon Douis (1935–2021), French footballer
- Yvon Ducharme, a fictional character
- Yvon Duhamel (1939–2021), Canadian motorcycle racer
- Yvon Dupuis (1926–2017), Canadian politician
- Yvon Durelle (1929–2007), Canadian boxer
- Yvon Gariepy (born 1926), President of the Royal Canadian Mint
- Yvon Gattaz (1925–2024), French businessman
- Yvon Godin (born 1955), Canadian politician
- Yvon Goujon (born 1937), French footballer
- Yvon Jaspers (born 1973), Dutch television presenter
- Yvon Krevé (21st century), Canadian hip hop singer
- Yvon L'Heureux (1914–1984), Canadian politician
- Yvon Labre (born 1949), Canadian ice hockey player
- Yvon Lafrance (1944–2022), Canadian politician
- Yvon Lamarre (1935–2020), Canadian politician
- Yvon Lambert (born 1950), Canadian ice hockey player
- Yvon Lambert (photographer) (born 1955), Luxembourgian photojournalist
- Yvon Le Roux (born 1960), French footballer
- Yvon Lemire (born 1939), Canadian politician
- Yvon Lévesque (born 1940), Canadian politician
- Yvon Marcoux (born 1941), Canadian politician
- Yvon Michel (21st century), Canadian boxing promoter
- Yvon Neptune (born 1946), Prime Minister of Haiti
- Yvon Pedneault (21st century), Canadian sports journalist
- Yvon Petra (1916–1984), French tennis player
- Yvon Picotte (born 1941), Canadian politician
- Yvon Pinard (born 1940), Canadian politician
- Yvon Poitras (born 1948), Canadian politician
- Yvon Pouliquen (born 1962), French football manager
- Yvon Repérant, French harpsichordist
- Yvon Robert (1914–1971), Canadian professional wrestler
- Yvon Tassé (1910–1998), Canadian politician
- Yvon Vallières (born 1949), Canadian politician
- Yvon Vautour (born 1956), Canadian ice hockey player
- Yvon Villarceau (1813–1883), French astronomer
