= Sergei Yevin =

Russian footballer

Personal information
- Full name: Sergei Aleksandrovich Yevin
- Date of birth: 2 July 1977 (age 49)
- Height: 1.72 m (5 ft 7 1/2 in)
- Positions: Forward; midfielder

Senior career*
| Years | Team | Apps | (Gls) |
| 1995 | FC Volga Ulyanovsk | 18 | (2) |
| 1996 | FC Energiya Ulyanovsk (D4) | | |
| 1997–1999 | FC Energiya Ulyanovsk | 91 | (28) |
| 2000–2003 | FC Lada-Energiya Dimitrovgrad | 115 | (41) |
| 2004–2006 | FC Lada Togliatti | 69 | (13) |
| 2006 | FC Gazovik Orenburg | 16 | (6) |
| 2007 | FC Lada Togliatti | 9 | (5) |
| 2007–2008 | FC Volga Ulyanovsk | 30 | (5) |
| 2008–2009 | FC Gazovik Orenburg | 40 | (10) |
| 2010–2012 | FC Volga Ulyanovsk | 55 | (6) |
- * Club domestic league appearances and goals

Sergei Aleksandrovich Yevin (Russian: Серге́й Александрович Евин; born 2 July 1977) is a former Russian professional football player.

== Club career ==
He played two seasons in the Russian Football National League for FC Lada Togliatti and FC Volga Ulyanovsk.
