= Evaň =

- Municipality
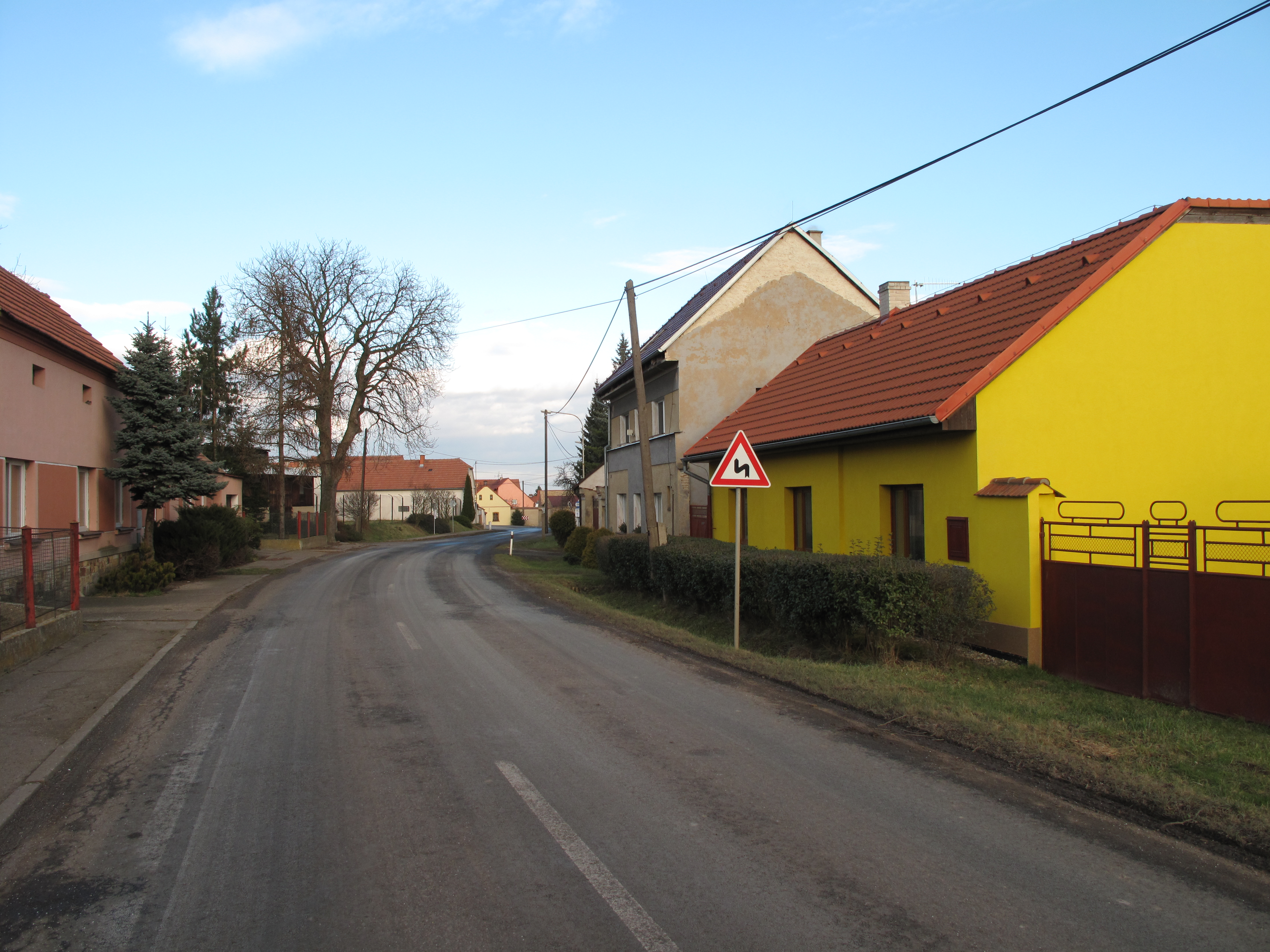
- A street in Evaň

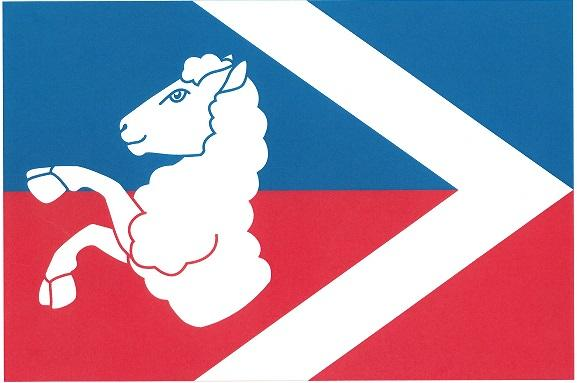
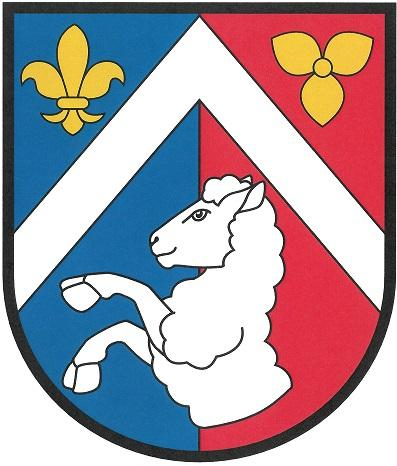
- Flag Coat of arms

- Location in the Czech Republic
- Coordinates: 50°23′3″N 14°1′44″E
- Country: Czech Republic
- Region: Ústí nad Labem
- District: Litoměřice
- First mentioned: 1437

Area
  - Total: 7.52 km^{2} (2.90 sq mi)
- Elevation: 286 m (938 ft)

Population (2026-01-01)
  - Total: 291
  - Density: 38.7/km^{2} (100/sq mi)
- Time zone: UTC+1 (CET)
  - Summer (DST): UTC+2 (CEST)
- Postal code: 410 02
- Website: www.obecevan.cz

Evaň is a municipality and village in Litoměřice District in the Ústí nad Labem Region of the Czech Republic. It has about 300 inhabitants.

Evaň lies approximately 19 kilometres (12 mi) south of Litoměřice, 32 km (20 mi) south of Ústí nad Labem, and 44 km (27 mi) north-west of Prague.

== Administrative division ==
Evaň consists of two municipal parts (in brackets population according to the 2021 census):

- Evaň (249)
- Horka (32)

== Demographics ==
Historical population
Year	Pop.	±%
1869	548	—
1880	563	+2.7%
1890	540	−4.1%
1900	624	+15.6%
1910	655	+5.0%
1921	648	−1.1%
1930	670	+3.4%
1950	478	−28.7%
1961	443	−7.3%
1970	386	−12.9%
1980	361	−6.5%
1991	263	−27.1%
2001	260	−1.1%
2011	267	+2.7%
2021	281	+5.2%
Source: Censuses
