= Yvonne (disambiguation) =

Yvonne is a female given name.

Yvonne may also refer to:

- Yvonne (band), a 1993—2002 Swedish group featuring Henric de la Cour
- Yvonne (cow) a German cow that escaped and was missing for several weeks in 2011
- Yvonne (musical), a 1926 West End musical

== See also ==
- Ivonne, a given name
