= Even =

Even may refer to:

== General ==
- Even (company), a Brazilian construction and real estate company
- Even (given name), a Norwegian male personal name
- Even (surname), a Breton surname
- Even people (Evens), an ethnic group from Siberia and Russian Far East
  - Even language, a language spoken by the Evens
- Evening, the period of a day that begins at the end of daylight and overlaps with the beginning of night

== Science and technology ==
- In mathematics, the term even is used in several senses related to odd:
  - Even and odd numbers, an integer is even if dividing by two yields an integer
  - Even and odd functions, a function is even if f(−x) = f(x) for all x
  - Even and odd permutations, a permutation of a finite set is even if it is composed of an even number of transpositions
  - Singly even number, an integer divisible by 2 but not divisible by 4
- Even code, if the Hamming weight of all of a binary code's codewords is even

== Entertainment ==
- Even (band), an Australian alternative rock band
- "Even", a song by Chris Brown from his 2017 album Heartbreak on a Full Moon
- Even Hotels, a brand of IHG Hotels & Resorts
- Even, an art magazine co-founded by Jason Farago

== See also ==
- Evens (disambiguation)
