= Evans =

Evans or Evan's may refer to:

== People ==
- Evans (surname)
- List of people with surname Evans
- Evans Welch, Trinidad and Tobago politician

== Places ==
=== United States ===
- Evans Island, an island of Alaska
- Evans, Colorado
- Evans, Georgia
- Evans County, Georgia
- Evans, New York
- Evans Mills, New York
- Evans City, Pennsylvania
- Evans, West Virginia

=== Elsewhere ===
- Évans, in France
- Cape Evans, in Antarctica

=== Creeks ===
- Evans Creek (Peters Creek), a tributary of Peters Creek in California
- Evans Creek (Tuscarawas River), a stream in Ohio
- Evans Creek (Devils River), a stream in Texas

== Businesses and organizations ==
- Robert B. Evans, founder of Evans Industries
- Evans (retailer), of the United Kingdom
- Evans Cycles, a United Kingdom bicycle retailer
- Bob Evans Restaurants, a chain operated by Bob Evans Farms, Inc. of the United States
- H. C. Evans, a defunct manufacturer of casino, amusement park and fairground equipment in the United States
- D'Addario (manufacturer), a drumhead manufacturer also known as "Evans"
- Evans GP, Australian auto racing team

== Transportation ==
- Evans station (Muni Metro), a light rail station in San Francisco, California
- Evans station (RTD), a light rail station in Denver, Colorado

== Other ==
- Chukwudi Onuamadike, a Nigerian generally known as Evans
- Early American Imprints, Series I: Evans, 1639–1800 (bibliographic collection)
- Evans Gambit, a chess gambit
- Evans Blue, a Canadian rock group
- Evans syndrome, an autoimmune disease
- Evans-Tibbs House, historic residence in Washington, D.C.

== See also ==
- Evan (disambiguation)
- Evansville (disambiguation)
  - Evansville, Indiana, the third-most populous city in Indiana
- Evans Bay (disambiguation)
- Evans Lake (disambiguation)
- Justice Evans (disambiguation)
