= Evans Creek =

Evans Creek may refer to:

- Evans Creek (Peters Creek), a stream in California
- Evans Creek (Tuscarawas River), a stream in Ohio
- Evans Creek (Rogue River tributary), a stream in Oregon
- Evans Creek (Devils River), a stream in Texas
- Evans Creek (Lake Erie), a watershed administered by the Long Point Region Conservation Authority, that drains into Lake Erie

== See also ==
- Evans River
