= List of lakes of Ohio =

The following is a list of lakes in Ohio. According to the Ohio Department of Natural Resources, there are approximately 50,000 lakes and small ponds, with a total surface area of 200,000 acres, and among these there are 2,200 lakes of 5 acres (2.0 ha) or greater with a total surface area of 134,000 acres. Of the lakes that are greater than 5 acres, 446 are public lakes with a total surface area of 119,000 acres. Swimming, fishing, and/or boating are permitted in some of these lakes, but not all.

The United States Environmental Protection Agency estimated (from an electronic file generated from 1:100,000 scale maps) that Ohio has 5,130 lakes totaling 188,461 acres (76,267 ha). The difference in the number of lakes estimated by USEPA and ODNR is likely related to numerous small ponds (high number, small acreage) not detected on the 1:100,000 scale maps.

The second table below lists all of Ohio's 110 natural lakes of 5 acres or greater. The third table lists Ohio's 113 largest artificial lakes, which are 100 acres or greater. Ohio's artificial lakes outnumber its natural lakes by about 20 to 1, and they cover about 30 times more total surface area.

== Great Lakes ==
One of the five Great Lakes is partially within Ohio.

Name	GNIS ID # and link	Coordinates	Surface area	Counties
Lake Erie	1075813	41°52′35″N 80°53′34″W	9,910 sq mi (25,700 km^{2})	Ashtabula, Cuyahoga, Erie, Lake; Lorain, Lucas, Ottawa

== Natural inland lakes ==
There are 110 natural inland lakes in Ohio with a surface area of 5 acres (2.0 ha) or larger.

Name	GNIS ID # and link	Surface area	Township	County
Alder Pond		15 acres (6.1 ha)	Tallmadge	Summit
Aurora Pond		345 acres (140 ha)	Aurora	Portage
Baker Lake	1037586	8 acres (3.2 ha)	Goshen	Champaign
Bass Lake	1060847	128 acres (52 ha)	Munson	Geauga
Bath Pond	1037677	13 acres (5.3 ha)	Bath	Summit
Big Lake	1060872	15 acres (6.1 ha)	Milford	Defiance
Black Lake	1038077	27 acres (11 ha)	Miami	Logan
Black Pond		7 acres (2.8 ha)	Copley	Summit
Braden Lake		14 acres (5.7 ha)	Union	Logan
Brady Lake	1038256	70 acres (28 ha)	Franklin	Portage
Breed Loves Pond		7 acres (2.8 ha)	Salem	Champaign
Brown Lake	1060898	6 acres (2.4 ha)	Clinton	Wayne
Brush Lake	1038417	15 acres (6.1 ha)	Rush	Champaign
Camden Reservoir		9 acres (3.6 ha)	Camden	Lorain
Chippewa Lake		324 acres (131 ha)	Westfield	Medina
Collins Pond		6 acres (2.4 ha)	Ravenna	Portage
Congress Lake	1070720	200 acres (81 ha)	Lake	Stark
Crystal Lake	1039516	20 acres (8.1 ha)	Bethel	Clark
Crystal Lake	1039517	25 acres (10 ha)	Rootstown	Portage
Crystal Lake	1039518	25 acres (10 ha)	Silver Lake	Summit
Davenport Pond	1039589	10 acres (4.0 ha)	Pickaway	Pickaway
Dohner Lake	1070733	17 acres (6.9 ha)	Chippewa	Wayne
Doke Lake		6 acres (2.4 ha)	Union	Logan
East Twin Lake	1058271	67 acres (27 ha)	Franklin	Portage
Ensley-Genert Pond		6 acres (2.4 ha)	Bloom	Seneca
Ferry Lake		8 acres (3.2 ha)	Franklin	Portage
Fishel Lake		19 acres (7.7 ha)	Valley	Guernsey
Fox Lake		40 acres (16 ha)	Baughman	Wayne
Fudger Lake	1040716	6 acres (2.4 ha)	Goshen	Champaign
Geauga Lake	1040805	50 acres (20 ha)	Bainbridge	Geauga
Grape Lake	1041056	14 acres (5.7 ha)	Coventry	Summit
Haddix Lake		7 acres (2.8 ha)	Pleasant	Clark
Hitler Pond	1041627	6 acres (2.4 ha)	Pickaway	Pickaway
Kiwanis Lake	1042310	8 acres (3.2 ha)	Newbury	Geauga
Ladd Lake	1042365	10 acres (4.0 ha)	Milford	Defiance
Lake Anna	1037431	12 acres (4.9 ha)	Barberton	Summit
Lake Aquilla	1060826	27 acres (11 ha)	Claridon	Geauga
Lake George	1040821	12 acres (4.9 ha)	Franklin	Portage
Lake Hodgson	1043717	190 acres (77 ha)	Ravenna	Portage
Lake Kelso	1061137	26 acres (11 ha)	Burton	Geauga
Lake Nesmith	1061168	80 acres (32 ha)	Coventry	Summit
Lake O'Pine	1044017	16 acres (6.5 ha)	Lake	Stark
Lake Pippen	1058265	143 acres (58 ha)	Franklin	Portage
Lemon Lake	1066066	5 acres (2.0 ha)	Union	Logan
Little Fox Lake		7 acres (2.8 ha)	Baughman	Wayne
Little Lake	1042670	10 acres (4.0 ha)	Milford	Defiance
Little Punderson Lake	1070819	26 acres (11 ha)	Newbury	Geauga
Long Lake		42 acres (17 ha)	Washington	Holmes
Luna Lake	1042835	61 acres (25 ha)	Franklin	Summit
McMillen Lake	1043138	5 acres (2.0 ha)	Union	Logan
McQuery Lake		6 acres (2.4 ha)	Harrison	Champaign
Meadowbrook Lake		45 acres (18 ha)	Danbury	Ottawa
Metcalf Lake		12 acres (4.9 ha)	Lake	Ashland
Meyers Lake	1058174	134 acres (54 ha)	Canton	Stark
Mud Lake	1043694	35 acres (14 ha)	Clear Creek	Ashland
Mud Lake	1043697	10 acres (4.0 ha)	Northwest	Williams
Muzzy Lake	1061166	82 acres (33 ha)	Rootstown	Portage
Nettle Lake	1043808	94 acres (38 ha)	Northwest	Williams
Newell Lake		5 acres (2.0 ha)	Union	Logan
Nobles Pond		5 acres (2.0 ha)	Jackson	Stark
Odell Lake	1057895	107 acres (43 ha)	Washington	Holmes
Punderson Lake	1044798	101 acres (41 ha)	Newbury	Geauga
Restful Lake	1044951	11 acres (4.5 ha)	Newbury	Geauga
Round Lake	1045222	25 acres (10 ha)	Lake	Ashland
Rubber City Sand & Gravel		13 acres (5.3 ha)	Springfield	Summit
Ruby Lake	1057973	5 acres (2.0 ha)	Union	Logan
Rushcreek Lake		21 acres (8.5 ha)	Rush Creek	Logan
Sandy Lake	1045956	90 acres (36 ha)	Rootstown	Portage
Sayres Lake	1079588	7 acres (2.8 ha)	Concord	Champaign
Shocalog Lake		7 acres (2.8 ha)	Copley	Summit
Silver Lake	1046281	35 acres (14 ha)	Harrison	Logan
Silver Lake	1046282	91 acres (37 ha)	Silver Lake	Summit
Singer Lake	1046298	62 acres (25 ha)	Green	Summit
Sippo Lake		88 acres (36 ha)	Perry	Stark
Sites Lake	1046306	7 acres (2.8 ha)	Mifflin	Richland
Smoot Lake	1046392	5 acres (2.0 ha)	Washington	Licking
Snow Lake	1058027	11 acres (4.5 ha)	Burton	Geauga
Spring Lake	1046566	29 acres (12 ha)	Clear Creek	Ashland
Springfield Lake	1046596	200 acres (81 ha)	Springfield	Summit
Stewart Pond	1061208	29 acres (12 ha)	Franklin	Portage
Summit Lake		100 acres (40 ha)	Akron	Summit
Sunny Lake	1046862	63 acres (25 ha)	Aurora	Portage
Turkeyfoot Lake	1061221	318 acres (129 ha)	Green	Summit
Twin Lake (1)		5 acres (2.0 ha)	Union	Logan
Twin Lake (2)		5 acres (2.0 ha)	Union	Logan
West Twin Lake	1058269	91 acres (37 ha)	Franklin	Portage
White Pond		18 acres (7.3 ha)	Copley	Summit
Wingfoot Lake		262 acres (106 ha)	Suffield	Portage
Wyoga Lake	1048166	60 acres (24 ha)	Stow	Summit
Yellow Pond		5 acres (2.0 ha)	Copley	Summit
Z		13 acres (5.3 ha)	Twinsburg	Summit
Z		11 acres (4.5 ha)	Hudson	Summit
Z		10 acres (4.0 ha)	Suffield	Portage
Z		10 acres (4.0 ha)	Twinsburg	Summit
Z		9 acres (3.6 ha)	Plain	Stark
Z		8 acres (3.2 ha)	Green	Summit
Z		6 acres (2.4 ha)	Green	Summit
Z		6 acres (2.4 ha)	Green	Summit
Z		6 acres (2.4 ha)	Springfield	Summit
Z		5 acres (2.0 ha)	Bloom	Scioto
Z		5 acres (2.0 ha)	Coventry	Summit
Z		5 acres (2.0 ha)	Franklin	Summit
Z		5 acres (2.0 ha)	Franklin	Summit
Z		5 acres (2.0 ha)	Green	Summit
Z		5 acres (2.0 ha)	Green	Summit
Z		5 acres (2.0 ha)	Green	Summit
Z		5 acres (2.0 ha)	Hudson	Summit
Z		5 acres (2.0 ha)	Lake	Ashland
Z		5 acres (2.0 ha)	Stow	Summit
Z		5 acres (2.0 ha)	Twinsburg	Summit
Z – denotes that a lake is unnamed or that its name is not known.

== Artificial inland lakes ==
There are 113 artificial inland lakes in or partially within Ohio, with a surface area greater than 100 acres (40 ha).

Name	GNIS ID # and link	Coordinates	Surface area	County or Counties
Acton Lake	1070657		604 acres (244 ha)	Butler and Preble
Alum Creek Lake	1070661	40°10′36″N 82°57′24″W	3,387 acres (1,371 ha)	Delaware
Atwood Lake	1070667		1,540 acres (620 ha)	Carroll and Tuscarawas
Barbertown Wolf Creek Reservoir			196 acres (79 ha)	Summit
Beach City Lake			420 acres (170 ha)	Tuscarawas
Beaver Creek Reservoir			110 acres (45 ha)	Seneca
Beaver Lake			103 acres (42 ha)	Columbiana
Belmont Lake			117 acres (47 ha)	Belmont
Berlin Reservoir			3,590 acres (1,450 ha)	Portage
Big Island Wildlife Area Reservoir			382 acres (155 ha)	Marion
Bresler Reservoir			582 acres (236 ha)	Allen
Brown Lake			2,120 acres (860 ha)	Clark
Buckeye Lake			3,136 acres (1,269 ha)	Fairfield, Licking, Perry
Bucyrus Reservoir #4			150 acres (61 ha)	Crawford
Burr Oak Lake			664 acres (269 ha)	Athens and Morgan
Caesar Creek Reservoir			2,830 acres (1,150 ha)	Clinton and Warren
Charles Mill Lake	1039002		1,350 acres (550 ha)	Ashland and Richland
Cinnamon Lake			131 acres (53 ha)	Ashland
Clear Fork Reservoir	1070716		1,010 acres (410 ha)	Morrow and Richland
Clendening Lake	1085458	40°16′7″N 81°16′36″W	1,800 acres (730 ha)	Harrison
Cowan Lake	1061001	39°23′19″N 83°55′29″W	688 acres (278 ha)	Clinton
Deer Creek Lake			1,277 acres (517 ha)	Pickaway
Deer Creek Reservoir			313 acres (127 ha)	Stark
Defiance Power Dam Reservoir			679 acres (275 ha)	Defiance
Delaware Lake			1,300 acres (530 ha)	Delaware
Dillon Lake	1037280		1,325 acres (536 ha)	Muskingum
Dow Lake			161 acres (65 ha)	Athens
East Branch Reservoir			416 acres (168 ha)	Geauga
East Reservoir			201 acres (81 ha)	Summit
Eastwood Lake			170 acres (69 ha)	Montgomery
Evans Lake	1040260		566 acres (229 ha)	Mahoning
Ferguson Reservoir			305 acres (123 ha)	Allen
Findlay Reservoir #1			186 acres (75 ha)	Hancock
Findlay Reservoir #2			650 acres (260 ha)	Hancock
Forked Run Lake			104 acres (42 ha)	Meigs
Grand Lake St. Marys	1083992	40°31′52″N 84°29′59″W	12,700 acres (5,100 ha)	Auglaize and Mercer
Grant Lake			181 acres (73 ha)	Brown
Griggs Reservoir			385 acres (156 ha)	Franklin
Guilford Lake			396 acres (160 ha)	Columbiana
Hammertown Lake			186 acres (75 ha)	Jackson
Hargus Lake			130 acres (53 ha)	Pickaway
Harsha Lake		39°01′48″N 84°06′15″W	2,107 acres (853 ha)	Clermont
Highlandtown Lake			170 acres (69 ha)	Columbiana
Hoover Reservoir		40°06′29″N 82°52′54″W	3,000 acres (1,200 ha)	Delaware and Franklin
Independence Dam Reservoir			605 acres (245 ha)	Defiance
Indian Lake	1041943	40°28′03″N 83°52′31″W	5,104 acres (2,066 ha)	Logan
Jackson Lake			243 acres (98 ha)	Jackson
Killdeer Reservoir			253 acres (102 ha)	Wyandot
Killdeer Wildlife Pond #7			373 acres (151 ha)	Wyandot
Killdeer Wildlife Pond #8			225 acres (91 ha)	Wyandot
Killdeer Wildlife Pond #9			225 acres (91 ha)	Wyandot
Kirwan Reservoir			2,650 acres (1,070 ha)	Portage
Kiser Lake	1070804	40°11′17″N 83°57′56″W	394 acres (159 ha)	Champaign
Knox Lake			474 acres (192 ha)	Knox
LaDue Reservoir	1084011		1,500 acres (610 ha)	Geauga
Lake Hamilton			104 acres (42 ha)	Mahoning
Lake Hodgson			190 acres (77 ha)	Portage
Lake Hope			127 acres (51 ha)	Vinton
Lake LaComte			128 acres (52 ha)	Hancock
Lake La Su An			134 acres (54 ha)	Williams
Lake Logan	1078073	39°32′20″N 82°28′02″W	354 acres (143 ha)	Hocking
Lake Loramie			785 acres (318 ha)	Shelby
Lake Medina			109 acres (44 ha)	Medina
Lake Milton			1,685 acres (682 ha)	Mahoning
Lake Mohawk	1061156	40°40′26″N 81°11′29″W	507 acres (205 ha)	Carroll
Lake Rockwell			539 acres (218 ha)	Portage
Lake Rupert			325 acres (132 ha)	Vinton
Lake Snowden			131 acres (53 ha)	Athens
Lake Vesuvius			105 acres (42 ha)	Lawrence
Lake White			337 acres (136 ha)	Pike
Lake Waynoka	1077889	38°56′15″N 83°46′56″W	300 acres (120 ha)	Brown
Leesville Lake			1,000 acres (400 ha)	Carroll
Long Lake			180 acres (73 ha)	Summit
Lost Creek Reservoir			121 acres (49 ha)	Allen
Madison Lake	1042876	39°52′25″N 83°22′29″W	106 acres (43 ha)	Madison
McKelvey Lake			133 acres (54 ha)	Mahoning
Meander Creek Reservoir	1070843		2,010 acres (810 ha)	Mahoning and Trumbull
Metzger Reservoir			157 acres (64 ha)	Allen
Mogadore Reservoir			900 acres (360 ha)	Portage
Mosquito Creek Lake	1043509	41°22′16″N 80°45′18″W	7,850 acres (3,180 ha)	Trumbull
Mount Orab #1			181 acres (73 ha)	Brown
New London Reservoir			221 acres (89 ha)	Huron
Newport Lake			105 acres (42 ha)	Mahoning
Nimisila Reservoir			825 acres (334 ha)	Summit
North Branch Kokosing Lake			154 acres (62 ha)	Knox
North Reservoir			160 acres (65 ha)	Summit
Ohio Power Recreation Lakes			2,000 acres (810 ha)	Morgan
O'Shaughnessy Reservoir		40°09′14″N 83°07′33″W	920 acres (370 ha)	Delaware
Paint Creek Lake			1,190 acres (480 ha)	Highland and Ross
Piedmont Lake			2,310 acres (930 ha)	Harrison
Pine Lake			474 acres (192 ha)	Mahoning
Pleasant Hill Lake			850 acres (340 ha)	Ashland
Pymatuning Reservoir	1044806		3,580 acres (1,450 ha)	Ashtabula (OH) and Crawford (PA)
Resthaven Wildlife Area Pond			200 acres (81 ha)	Erie
Roaming Rock Lake			464 acres (188 ha)	Ashtabula
Rocky Fork Lake		39°11′11″N 83°28′21″W	2,080 acres (840 ha)	Highland
Ross Lake			140 acres (57 ha)	Ross
Rush Creek Lake #6-A			300 acres (120 ha)	Fairfield
Salt Fork Reservoir			2,952 acres (1,195 ha)	Guernsey
Senecaville Lake	1058011		3,550 acres (1,440 ha)	Guernsey and Noble
Snider Ditch Lake			245 acres (99 ha)	Trumbull
Stonelick Reservoir			160 acres (65 ha)	Clermont
Tappan Lake	1046947	40°21′30″N 81°13′34″W	2,350 acres (950 ha)	Harrison
Tycoon Lake			204 acres (83 ha)	Gallia
Veterans Memorial Reservoir			165 acres (67 ha)	Hancock
Veto Lake			160 acres (65 ha)	Washington
Walburn Reservoir			670 acres (270 ha)	Stark
Wellington Upground Reservoir			160 acres (65 ha)	Lorain
West Reservoir			104 acres (42 ha)	Summit
Willard City Reservoir			200 acres (81 ha)	Huron
Wills Creek Lake			90 acres (36 ha)	Coshocton
Winton Woods Lake			183 acres (74 ha)	Hamilton
Wolf Run Reservoir			209 acres (85 ha)	Noble

== Notes ==
A: Notes:

345 USGS GNIS officially-named lakes in Ohio

1,255 USGS GNIS officially-named reservoirs in Ohio
