= Evans Lake =

Evans Lake or Lake Evans may refer to:

- Evans Lake (British Columbia), Canada
- Lake Evans (Quebec), Canada
- Evans Lake (South Georgia), United Kingdom
- Lake Evans (California), in Kern County, California, United States
- Lake Evans (Riverside, California), near North Hill in Riverside, California, United States
- Evans Lake (Powell County, Montana) in Powell County, Montana, United States
- Evans Lake (Sanders County, Montana) in Sanders County, Montana, United States
- Evans Lake (Ohio), United States
- Evans Lake (Okanogan County, Washington), United States
