= Bermuda Public Transportation Board =

Bus operating agency of the Bermudian government

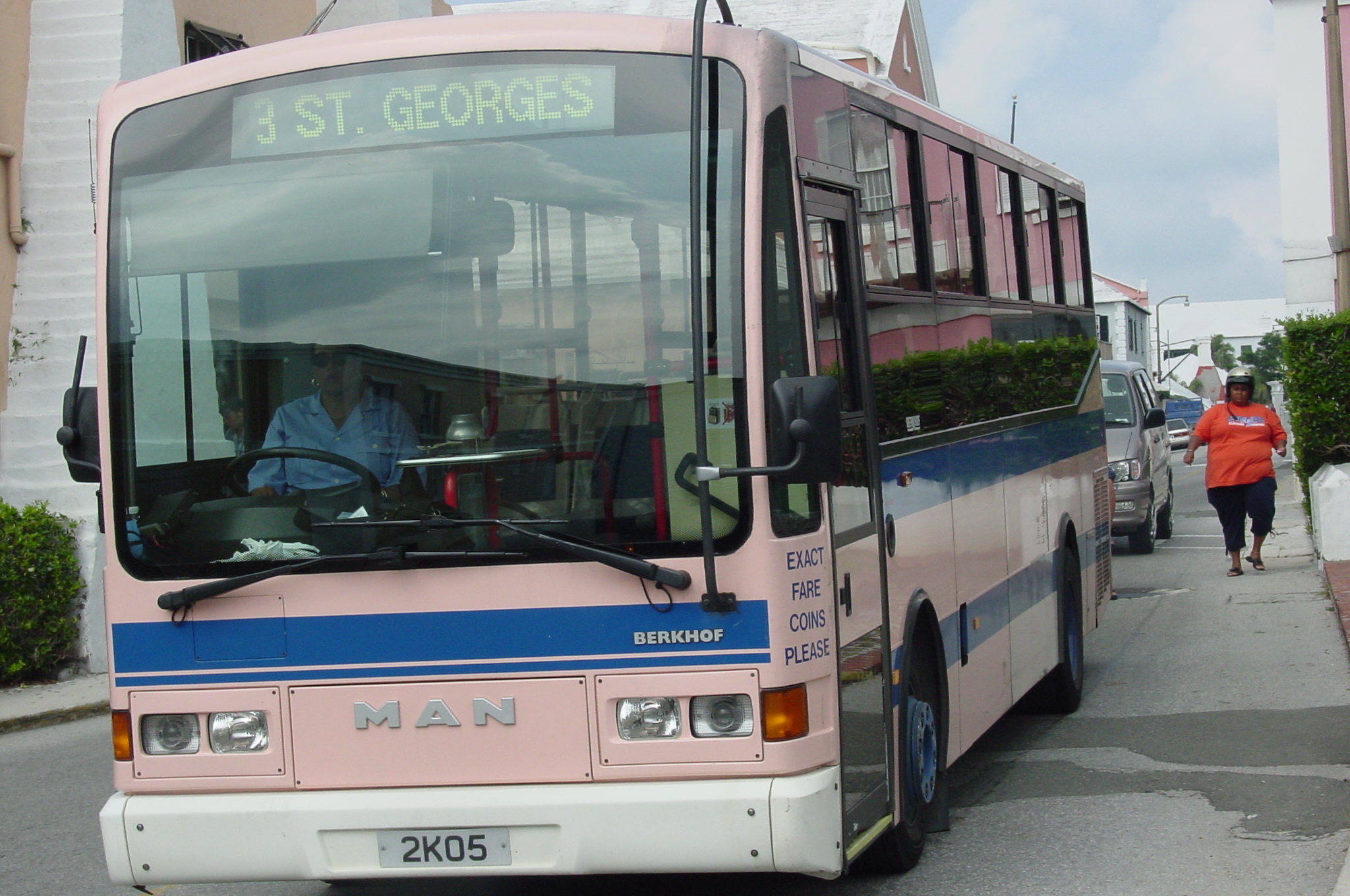
- One of the pink buses of Bermuda
- Headquarters: 26 Palmetto Rd, Devonshire
- Service area: Bermuda
- Service type: bus service
- Website: Bermuda Public Transportation Board

The Bermuda Public Transportation Board (PTB) is the government agency of the Ministry of Tourism and Transport that operates all bus services in Bermuda. School children use public buses as well as PTB-operated school buses. In addition, the PTB provides charter buses and sightseeing services.

== History ==
Buses were introduced to Bermuda in 1945 by the Bermuda Omni Bus Service, a division of the Bermuda Railway Service. The railway system closed in 1948. The Public Transportation Board was created in 1946 and operates all bus services. Buses, the backbone of the island's public transportation system, are supplemented by a public ferry service.

== Buses ==
Bermuda buses are specifically designed for the peculiarities of the island, being narrow enough to navigate the Bermuda roads. They have no provisions for transport of luggage, bicycles, or golf bags. Sightseeing buses are also provided by the Board.

MAN manufactures the diesel buses, and Berkhof outfits them as coaches. Bermuda received 15 new low-floor buses in March 2009. These buses have 32–34 seats, fewer than the older buses, but allow wheelchair access. The livery of all buses is pink and blue recalling the colors of the Bermuda beaches.

== Fares and operations ==
Bermuda is divided in 14 fare zones of about 2 miles length and fares are based on the number of zones travelled. Buses require exact fare in local currency, tokens, or prepaid tickets; transfers are available. Single- or multiple-day transportation passes, accepted on buses and ferries, can be purchased. Children under age five ride free, and at age 5–15 pay a reduced rate.

A digital fare system was launched in 2024 with the introduction of the Shorelink App. The system was upgraded to included real-time vehicle tracking in May of 2025.

Buses run typically between 7 am and 11 pm at variable (often 15-minute) intervals. Schedules assume an average speed of 35 kilometres per hour (22 mph). Bus stops, many of which are sheltered, are marked by pink (direction towards Hamilton) or blue (direction away from Hamilton) poles. Buses stop by them at request.

Most visitors from cruise ships use the bus system; however, airline passengers cannot transport luggage on the buses and generally prefer the taxi or airport limo system.

== Bus routes ==
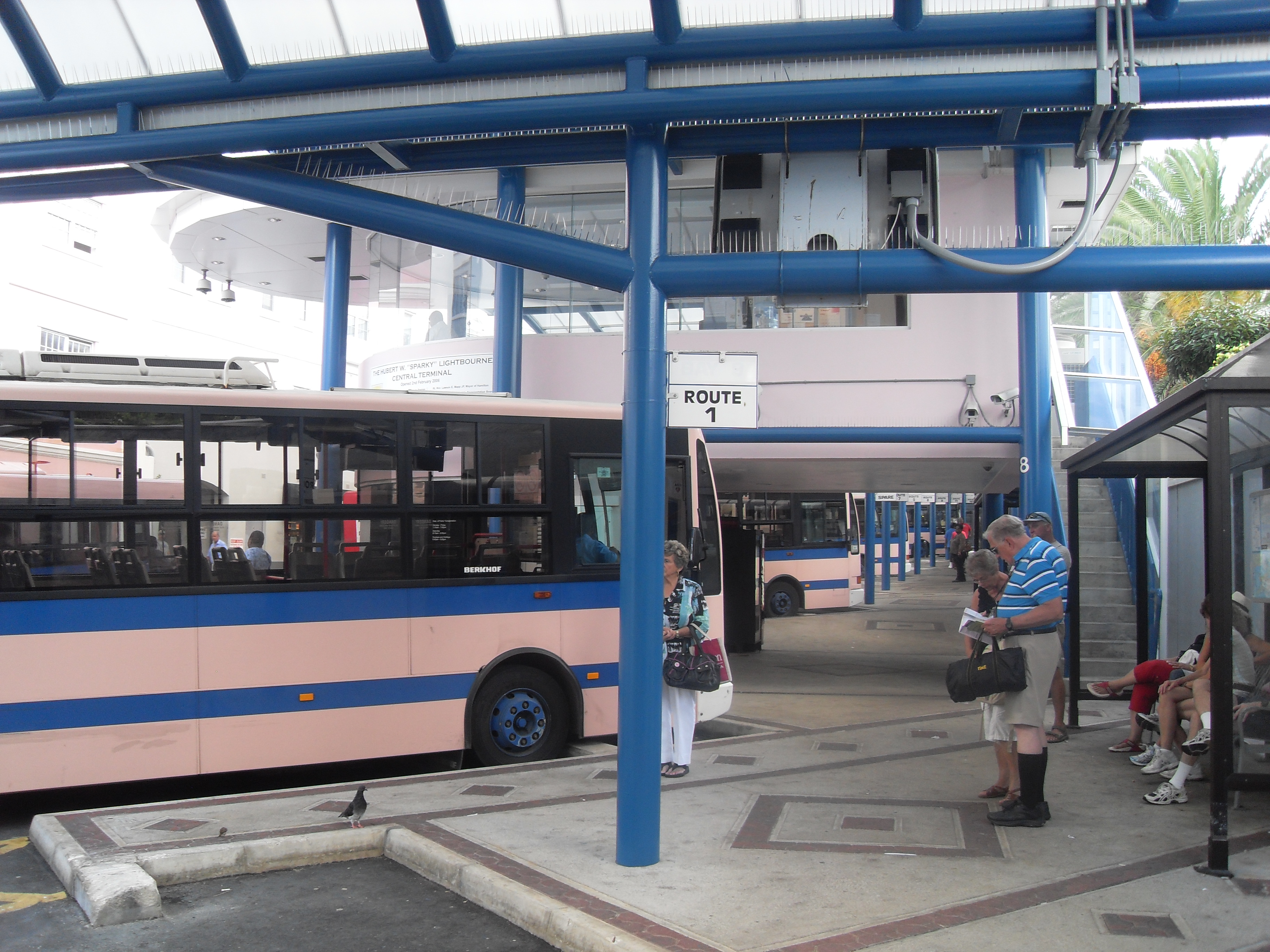
Bus Terminal, Hamilton, Bermuda

All but one route start from the bus terminal in Hamilton.

- Route 1 - Hamilton / Grotto Bay / St. George's
- Route 2 - Hamilton / Ord Road
- Route 3 - Hamilton / Grotto Bay / St. George's
- Route 4 - Hamilton / Spanish Point
- Route 5 - Hamilton / Pond Hill
- Route 6 - St. George's / St. David's
- Route 7 - Hamilton / Barnes Corner via South Shore Road
- Route 8 & 8C - Hamilton / Barnes Corner; Hamilton / Dockyard; Hamilton / Somerset via Middle Road
- Route 9 - Hamilton / Prospect (National Stadium)
- Route 10 - Hamilton / St. George's via North Shore past Aquarium
- Route 11 - Hamilton / St. George's via North Shore Road

== See also ==
- Transport in Bermuda
