= Evans Bay (disambiguation) =

Evans Bay or Evan's Bay may refer to:

- Evans Bay (New Zealand); a bay in Wellington Harbour, North Island
  - Evans Bay Patent Slip, a historic slipway and shipyard
- Evans Bay, New Zealand, a suburb of Wellington, North Island
- Evans Bay Intermediate School, Kilbirnie, Wellington, North Island, New Zealand
- Evans Bay (Nunavut), a bay on Erskine Inlet, Bathurst Island, Qikiqtaaluk Region, Canadian Arctic Archipelago, Nunavut, Canada
- Evan's Bay, Bermuda; see Bermuda Railway

== See also ==
- Evans (disambiguation)
- Evan (disambiguation)
- Bay (disambiguation)
