= Evansville (disambiguation) =

Evansville is the third largest city in the U.S. state of Indiana.

Evansville may refer to:

== Places ==
=== Canada ===
- Evansville, Ontario (disambiguation)

=== United States ===
- Evansville, Alaska
- Evansville, Arkansas
- Evansville, Illinois
- Evansville Precinct, Randolph County, Illinois
- Evansville, Minnesota
- Evansville Township, Douglas County, Minnesota
- Evansville, Missouri
- Evansville, Wisconsin
- Evansville, Wyoming

== Sports teams ==
- Evansville BlueCats, professional indoor football team
- Evansville Crimson Giants, one of several defunct NFL teams
- Evansville Otters, minor league baseball team

== Other uses ==
- Evansville Regional Airport, near Evansville, Indiana
- University of Evansville

== See also ==
- Evinsville, South Carolina
