= Meander Creek (Mahoning River tributary) =

Stream in Mahoning and Trumbull County, Ohio, U.S.

Coordinates: 41°10′23″N 80°45′27″W

Meander Creek is a stream in the U.S. state of Ohio, specifically the counties of Mahoning and Trumbull. It is a tributary of the Mahoning River. The creek is impounded by the Meander Creek Reservoir.

The creek was so named on account of its meandering course.

== See also ==
- List of rivers of Ohio
