= Judge Evans =

Judge Evans may refer to:

- Anthony Evans (judge) (born 1934), Lord Justice of Appeal of England and Wales
- Beverly Daniel Evans Jr. (1865–1922), judge of the United States District Court for the Southern District of Georgia
- Evan Alfred Evans (1876–1948), judge of the United States Court of Appeals for the Seventh Circuit
- John Maxwell Evans (born 1942), judge of the Canadian Federal Court of Appeal
- Orinda Dale Evans (born 1943), judge of the United States District Court for the Northern District of Georgia
- Samuel Evans (British politician) (1859–1918), president judge of the Probate, Divorce and Admiralty Division of the High Court of Justice of England and Wales
- Terence T. Evans (1940–2011) was a judge of the United States Court of Appeals for the Seventh Circuit
- Timothy C. Evans (born 1943), chief judge of the Cook County, Illinois, Circuit Court
- Vincent Evans (1915–2007), judge of the European Court of Human Rights
- Walter Evans (American politician) (1842–1923), judge of the United States District Courts for the District of Kentucky and the Western District of Kentucky
- Walter Howard Evans (1870–1959), judge of the United States Customs Court
- William Evans (judge) (1846/47–1918), judge of the county court of mid-Wales

== See also ==
- Justice Evans (disambiguation)
