= Peters Creek (California) =

River in California, United States

Coordinates: 37.251332°N 122.218022°W

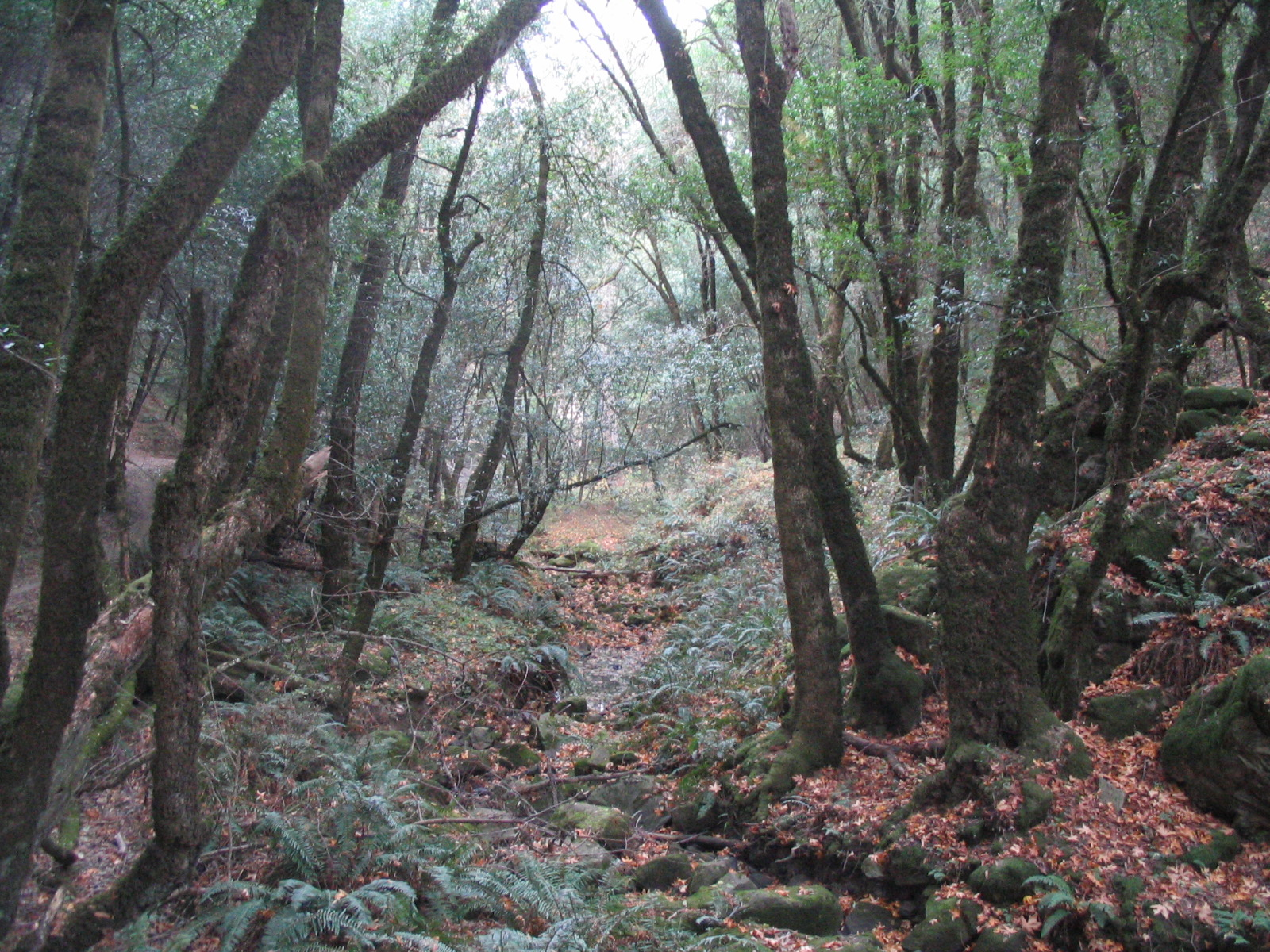
Peters Creek nearly dry in the autumn

Peters Creek is a 7.3-mile-long (11.7 km) stream in San Mateo County, California, and is a tributary of Pescadero Creek. It flows southwestwards through a small canyon to join Pescadero Creek in Portola Redwoods State Park, near La Honda.

== Tributaries ==
- Evans Creek
- Lambert Creek
- Bear Creek

== See also ==
- List of watercourses in the San Francisco Bay Area
