= Bear Creek (Peters Creek tributary) =

River in California, United States

Bear Creek is a tributary of Peters Creek in San Mateo County, California in the United States. 37.27661°N 122.198855°W

== See also ==
- List of watercourses in the San Francisco Bay Area
