= Lambert Creek =

Creek in California, United States

Coordinates: 37.295776°N 122.185521°W

Lambert Creek is a tributary of Peters Creek in San Mateo County, California in the United States.

== See also ==
- List of watercourses in the San Francisco Bay Area
