= Horseshoe Bay, Bermuda =

Well known Beach in Bermuda

Coordinates: 32°15′8″N 64°49′18″W

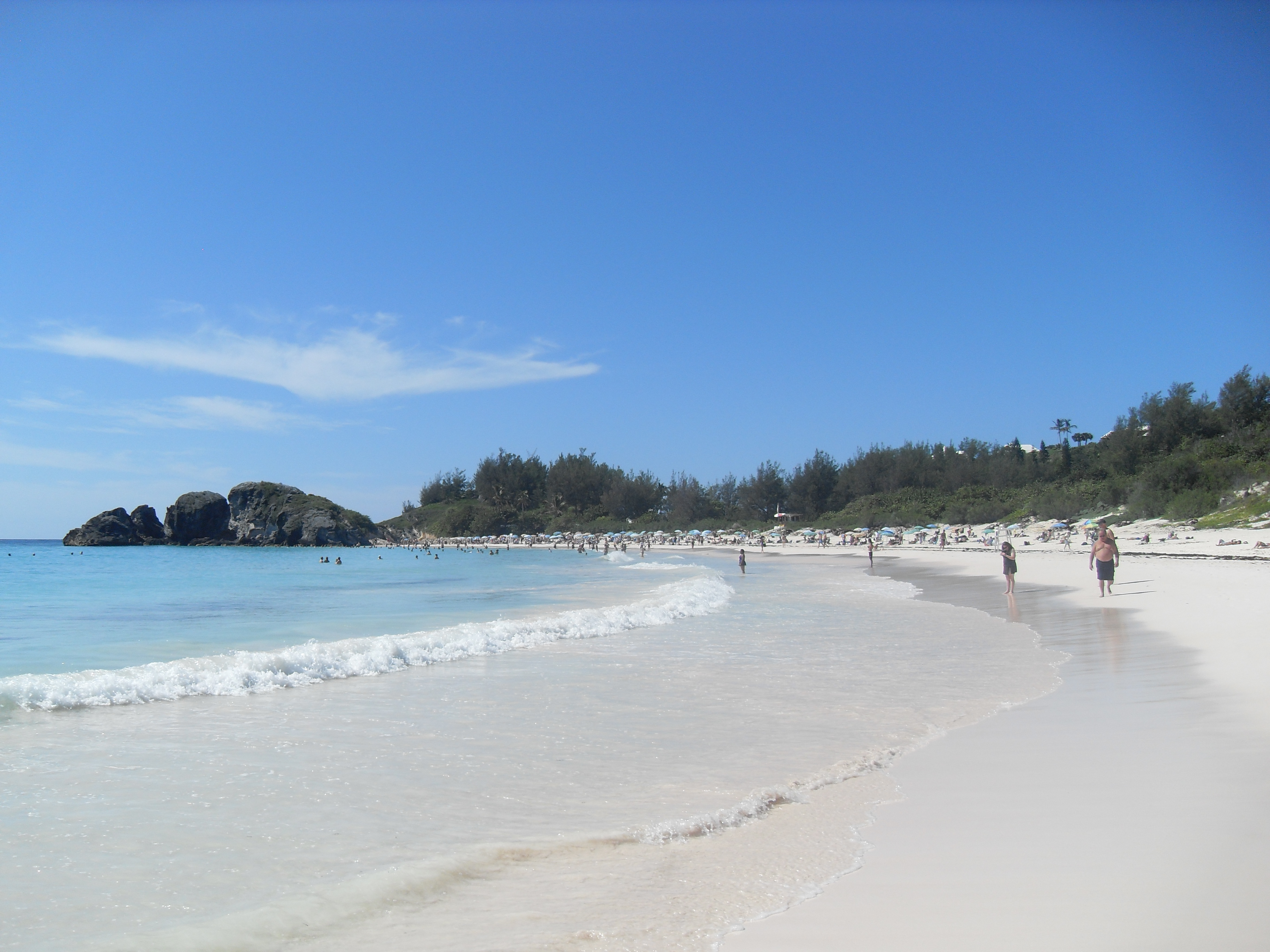
The bay

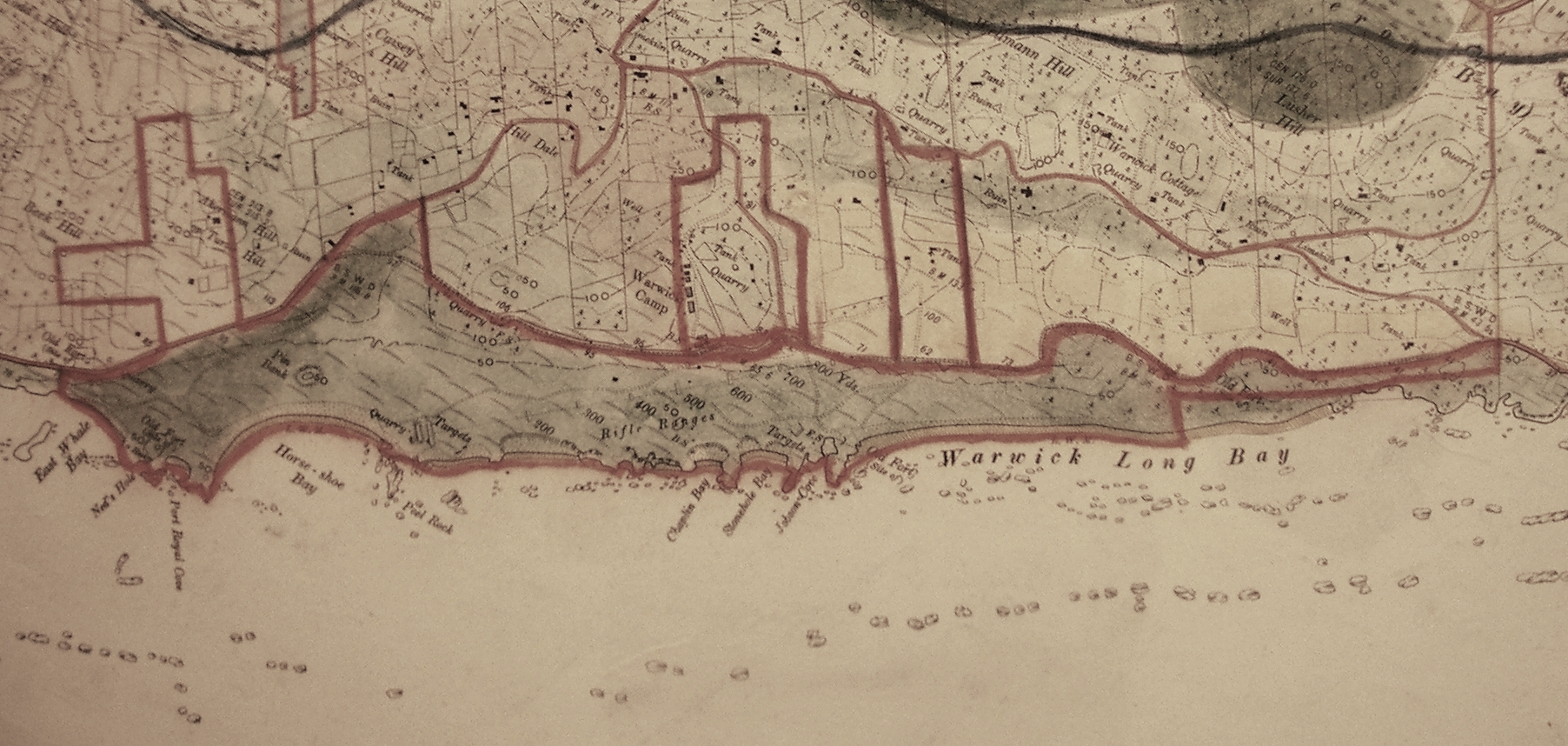
Horseshoe Bay is shown at the West of this map of Warwick Camp

Horseshoe Bay is a well-known beach in Bermuda. As a tourist spot, it lies on the main island's south (Atlantic Ocean) coast, in the parish of Southampton. It is one of two beaches of the same name in Bermuda, with the other located at Tucker's Island. Since the 1940s, part of a peninsula that housed the former US Naval Operating Base, and is now called Morgan's Point.

The beach is famous for its pink-hued sands, which are created by the tiny red foraminifera organisms mixed with the very fine white sand of Horseshoe Bay. The beach is equipped with one lifeguard station, which is staffed during the summer between 10 AM and 6 PM. There is also a café where lunch can be purchased during the summer months. The same building also provides toilet facilities, showers, and a foot-washing area to remove sand before departure. A shuttle bus is available from 11 am to 6 pm to transport beach-goers between the beach and the nearest bus stop, carrying passengers down the hill for $10 each, and up for $20. The Government provides a special bus service for tourists at the top of the hill, leaving about every 15 minutes. This service operates from about 12 to 6 pm. If you miss the last special bus, the regular buses run about every 45 minutes until about 10 pm.

A beach volleyball competition takes place once a week in the summer months and is a regular activity for both tourists and locals. Horseshoe Bay is also the usual location for a New Year's party organized by those members of the significant expat population who have opted not to go overseas for the season. The Bermuda Good Friday KiteFest is a great family event held annually on Good Friday at Horseshoe Bay. The largest annual event in Bermuda also takes place at Horseshoe Bay on Emancipation Day (usually the last Wednesday night & Thursday in July or the first Wednesday night & Thursday in August) called The Bermuda Beachfest Emancipation Celebration. Beachfest (as it is known) is an action-packed 2-day event full of live entertainment, beach sports, cultural traditions, activities, and more. It attracts the largest cross-section of locals and visitors on the island.

Part of an army base, Warwick Camp, the area is still used for training by the Bermuda Regiment, especially in the winter months. The headland separating the western end from East Whale Bay holds the remains of fortifications that housed a coastal artillery battery, with another on the high ground behind. Horseshoe Bay itself lies in the danger area behind the butts of the rifle range of 800 yd (730 m), and the western end of the beach is littered with bullets fired from Enfield, Snider–Enfield, Martini–Henry, Lee–Metford, and Lee–Enfield rifles and other weapons of similar calibres. However, this range is no longer used due to the limited range of the 5.56mm NATO rifle cartridge, which has been used for the last three decades.
