= Evinsville, South Carolina =

Unincorporated community in South Carolina, US

Coordinates: 34°41′01″N 81°53′16″W

Evinsville is an unincorporated community in Spartanburg County, in the U.S. state of South Carolina.

== History ==
A post office called Evinsville was established in 1884, and remained in operation until 1906. Evinsville once contained a town store, a sawmill, and a cotton gin.
