= Meander Creek Reservoir =

- Mahoning Valley Sanitary District Reservoir
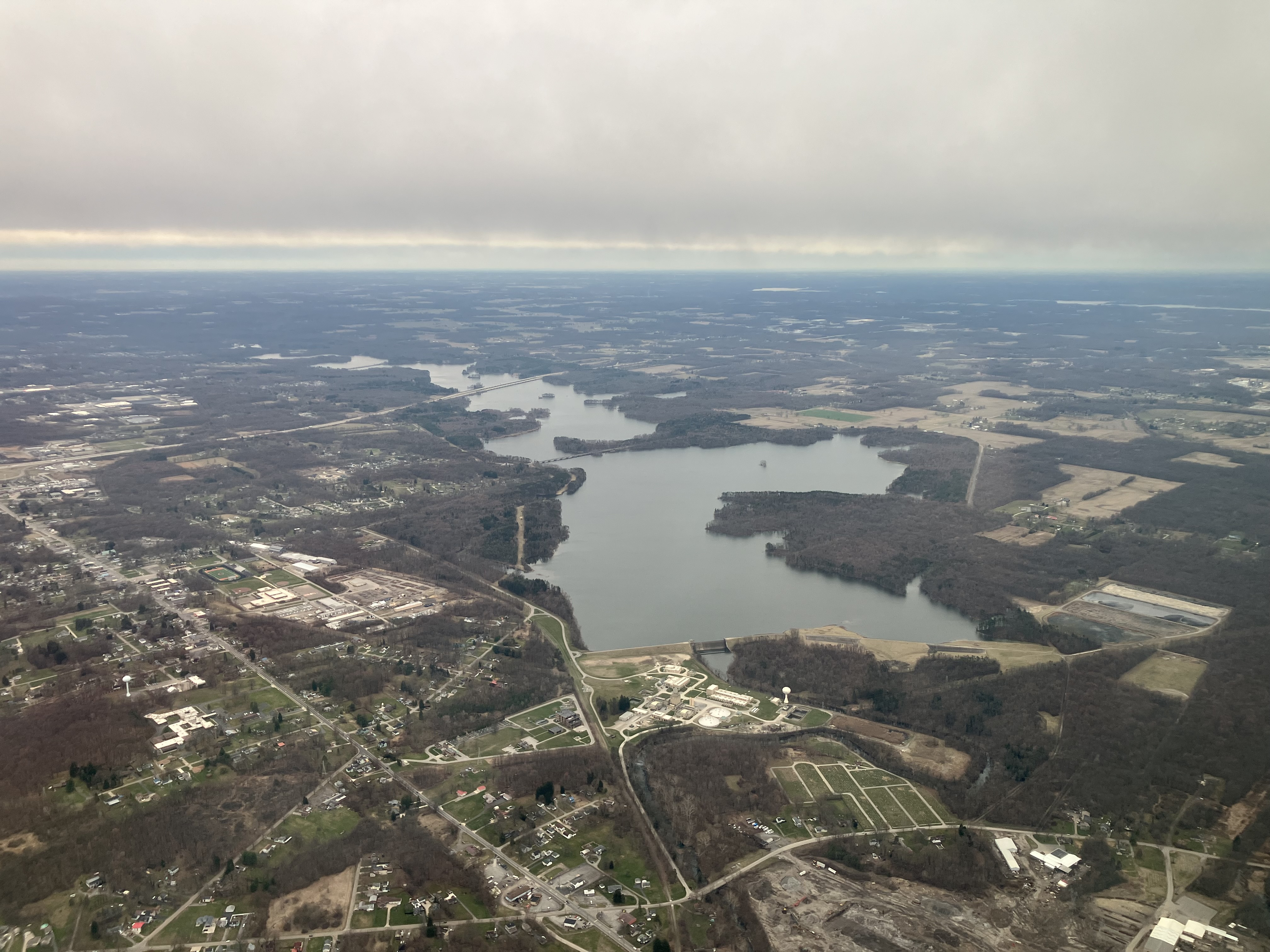
- Reservoir from 3000ft in the air

- Location within Ohio Location within the United States
- Location: Mahoning / Trumbull counties, Ohio
- Coordinates: 41°06′33″N 80°48′43″W
- Type: Reservoir
- Basin countries: United States
- Surface area: 2,010 acres (8.1 km^{2})
- Surface elevation: 906 ft (276 m)

Meander Creek Reservoir is a lake located along Meander Creek in Mahoning County and Trumbull County near Austintown, Ohio. The Meander Creek Reservoir is owned by the Mahoning Valley Sanitary District MVSD and is the largest provider of drinking water of Mahoning and Trumbull County Ohio.

== History ==
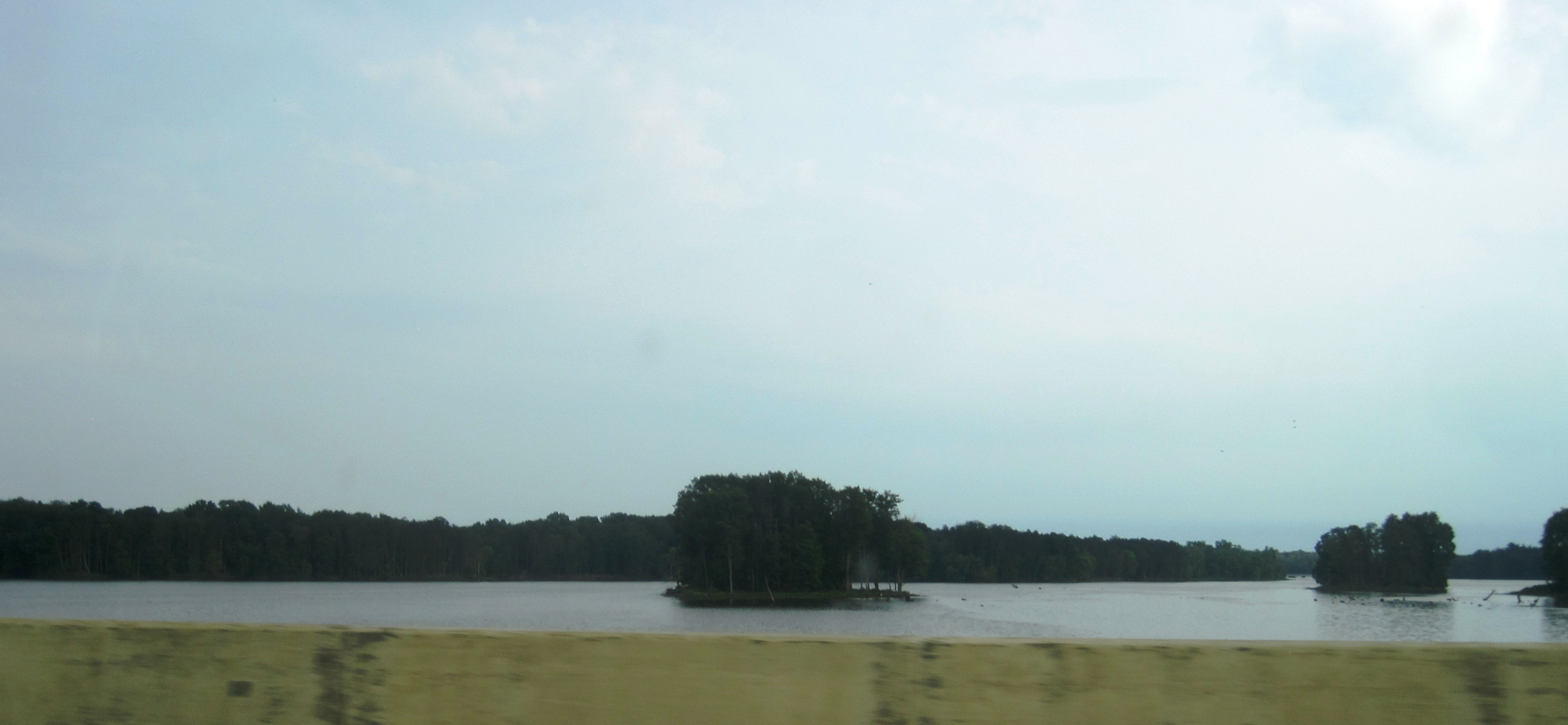
Reservoir as seen from I-80 looking southeast

In 1920, a petitioning effort began in the Mahoning Valley, an area consisting of cities such as Youngstown and Niles, Ohio for the formation of Water district. It was hoped that all the Mahoning Valley communities would unite, but there were too many obstacles. It settled on Youngstown and Niles as the two members of the future Water District in 1925.

The district bought its first piece of land in 1927 from Josiah Kirkpatrick, who changed his name to Kirk. Kirk Road in Austintown, Ohio was named after him.

Although, many water sources had been considered, including Lake Erie, it was decided to build a Mineral Ridge (Weathersfield Township), Ohio Dam on Meander Creek to create the reservoir with a purification plant. The total cost was nearly $9.2 million.

Construction was started in 1929 and continued through 1932 when the MVSD opened for business. In 1944, McDonald village was added as the third member.

The Auditor of State of Ohio has issued their Profile of the District in a recent Audit report, 2017.

The Mahoning Valley Sanitary District (“the District”) was formed in 1926 and began supplying water in 1932. The District provides water to the member cities – the City of Youngstown and the City of Niles; and by special contract to the Village of McDonald. The members serve surrounding areas such as Girard, Canfield, Mineral Ridge, Lordstown and portions of 10 other townships.

== Governance ==
The District is a political subdivision of the State of Ohio established under the authority of the Sanitary Act of Ohio and governed by the Ohio Revised Code Chapter 6115.

A Court of Jurisdiction that includes the Trumbull and Mahoning County Court of Common Pleas and a board of directors that is appointed by the member cities oversees the District.

The District's Board of Directors consists of four members, two from the City of Youngstown and two from the City of Niles. The Sanitary District Act empowers the District to provide water supply, treatment, transmission feeder systems and storage reservoirs, but not distribution.

== Operation ==
The District utilizes a five-year forecast as the original document from which to form succeeding year's operating and debt budget. After updating the forecast for changes in revenue and expense assumptions, department heads will operate from the established budget which is prepared and approved by the Board of Directors prior to July 1 of each fiscal year. The line item budgets are reviewed periodically to ensure management becomes aware of any significant changes during the fiscal year.

== Geography ==
The reservoir's south end continues as a little river going southward. The reservoir is managed by the Mahoning Valley Sanitary District. Hunting, boating and fishing are prohibited. Most of the reservoir is located in Austintown Township in Mahoning County or in Weathersfield Township in Trumbull County.

The dam creating the reservoir, Mineral Ridge Dam, is an earthen dam built in 1932. It is 60 feet high, 3480 feet long at its crest, impounds a maximum capacity of 62,000 acre-feet, and is owned and operated by the Mahoning Valley Sanitary District.
