= Evans (kidnapper) =

Nigerian serial kidnapper

Chukwudumeme Onwuamadike, popularly known as Evans, is a convicted Nigerian kidnapper. Onwuamadike is a native of Nnewi, Anambra State. He is sometimes referred to as "The Billionaire Kidnapper" because the Nigeria Police Force (NPF) believe he is one of the richest criminals in the kidnapping activities in Nigeria. In some of his operations, he made amounts of up to 1 million dollars. The Inspector General of Police Special Intelligence Response Team (IRT) of the Nigeria police force also described him as a very smart, crafty, and intelligent kidnapper having evaded arrest for four years even though he was on a most wanted list in three states (Lagos State, Edo State, and Anambra State).

Onwuamadike was arrested in Lagos during the weekend of 10–11 June 2017.

== Trial ==
On the 30th of August, 2017, Onwuamadike, along with fifteen members of his gang, were arraigned, facing a grand total of 52 charges of multiple murders, armed robberies, kidnappings, unlawful possession of firearms, unlawful possession of ammunition, and conspiracy, amongst other charges. He has been sentenced to life imprisonment by Justice Hakeem Oshodi for the unlawful conspiracy and kidnapping of Donatus Dunu, the CEO of Maydon Pharmaceuticals, in the Ilupeju area of Lagos State in February 2017 and receiving a ransom of €223,000. He has also been sentenced to an additional 21-year sentence by Justice Oluwatoyin Taiwo of the Lagos State Special Offences Court for the kidnapping of Sylvanus Ahanonu Hafia. According to the Director of Public Prosecutions, Ms. Titilayo Shitta-Bey, Onwuamadike contravened sections 409 and 269 of the Criminal Laws of Lagos State, 2011. Onwuamadike was re-arraigned before Justice A. O. Ogala on a five-count charge bordering on murder, attempted murder, and conspiracy to commit kidnapping on the 10th of October, 2025. Evans, however, still has outstanding cases before Justice Adedayo Akintoye, also of the same court.

== Conviction ==
On Friday, February 25, 2022, the Lagos state high court found Evans and two others guilty of kidnapping and conspiracy. In the ruling, the trial judge claimed "He showed no remorse in the dock and tried to lie his way out of the crimes despite the video evidence". Evans was thereafter sentenced to life imprisonment.
