= Evansville, Ontario =

Evansville can refer to the following places:

- Evansville, Manitoulin District, Ontario
- Evansville, Nipissing District, Ontario
