= Transport in Bermuda =

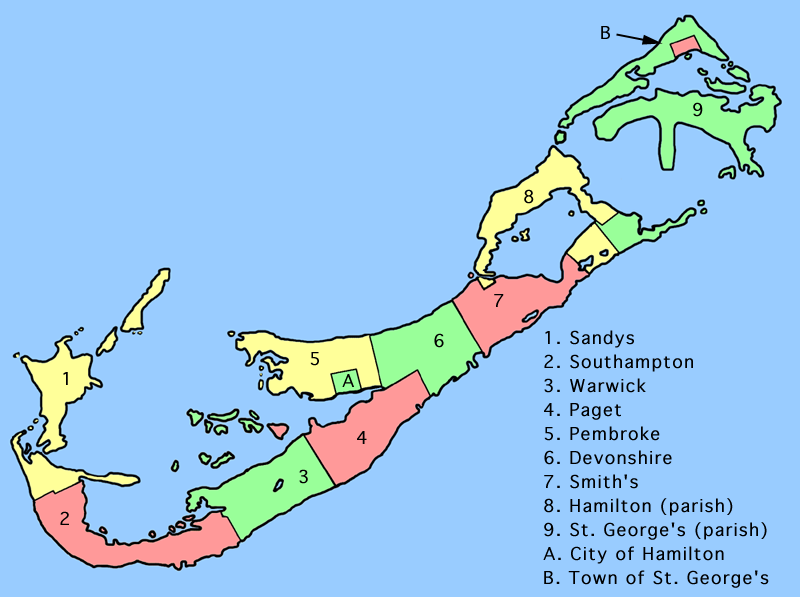
Map of Bermuda

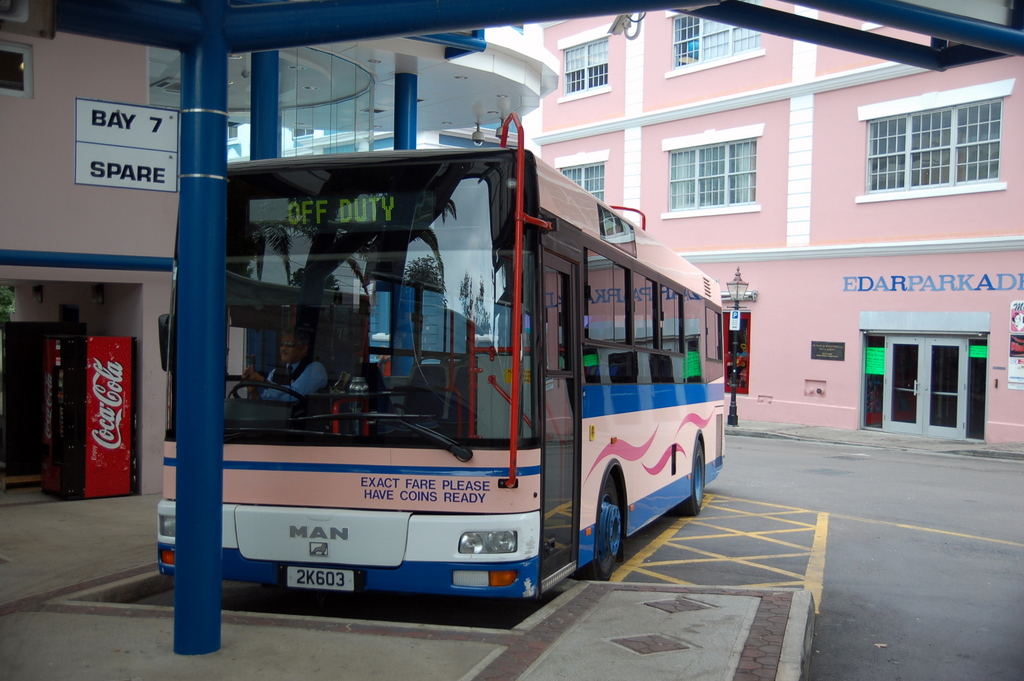
Pink buses of Bermuda

Bermuda consists of several islands with an area of 53.2 km^{2} (20.5 sq mi) with 447 km (278 mi) of paved roads—225 km (140 mi) of which are public roads and 222 km (138 mi) are private paved roads. A former railway track has been converted into a walking trail. There are also two marine ports (Hamilton and St. George's), and an airport, the L.F. Wade International Airport, located at the former U.S. Naval Air Station. A causeway links Hamilton Parish, Bermuda to St. George's and the airport.

In common with the United Kingdom and most British Overseas Territories, traffic drives on the left.

== Public transport ==
Bermuda's Ministry of Tourism and Transport manages the public ferry service, "SeaExpress", and the public bus system.

=== Bus service ===
After the Bermuda Railway, completed in the 1930s, was overworked during the Second World War (due to the lack of motor vehicles and the poor roads), the cost of repairs was so great that the railway was closed following the war and replaced by a government bus service operated by the Public Transport Board. From the main bus terminal in Hamilton eleven bus routes spread out in all directions of the island. As the island is relatively narrow and in most sections has a northern and southern route that are serviced, access to the system is usually within a short distance. The MAN buses have a pink and blue livery and stop at pink or blue markers.

Fares are based on sections traveled, and transfers are available; and visitors can obtain multiday passes that are valid on buses and ferries.

=== Ferry service ===
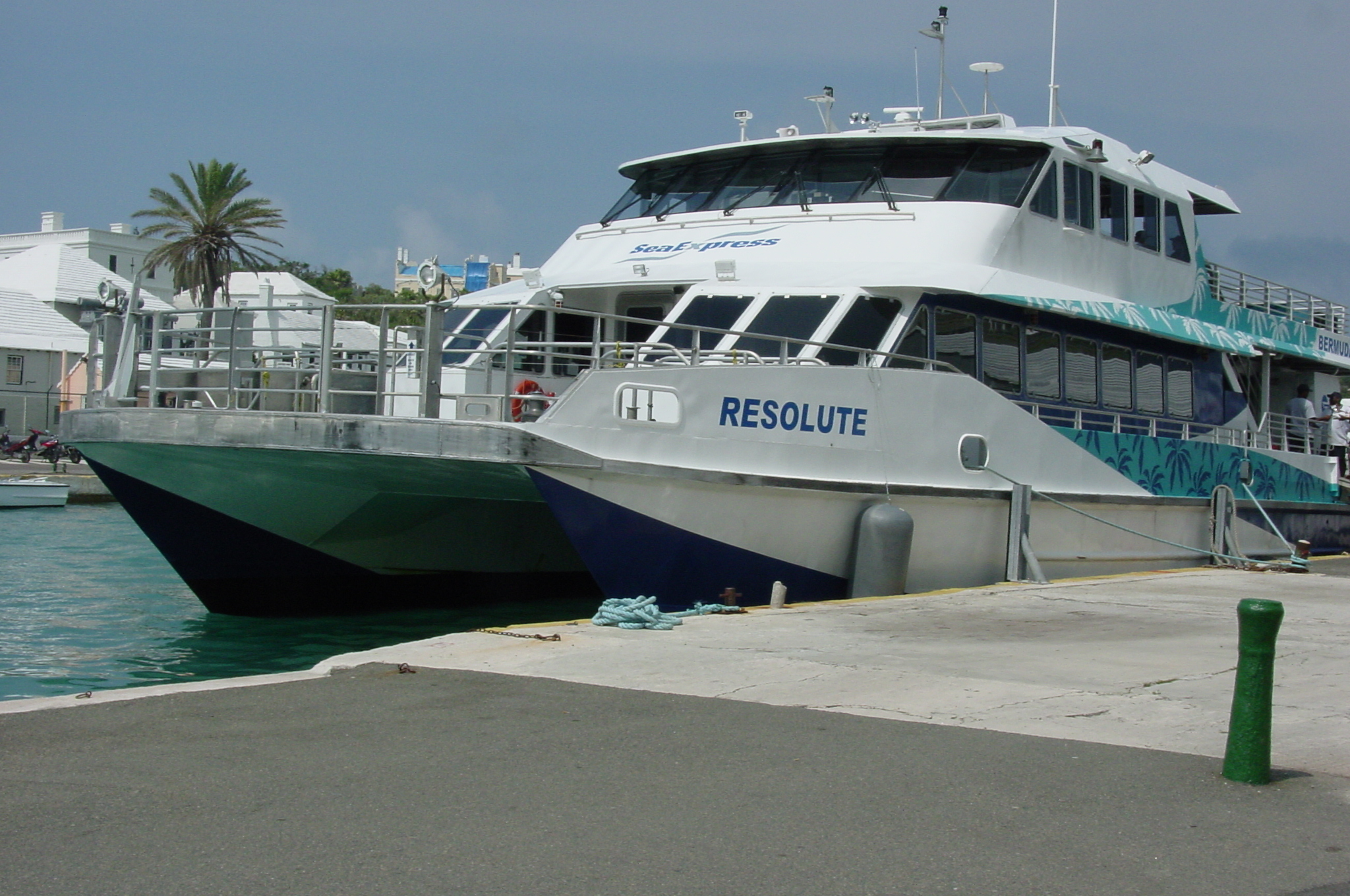
Ferry boat at the Dockyard

The territorial Government's Department of Marine and Ports has operated public ferries for decades, having replaced various commercially operated ferries that had ranged from rowboats to steamers. SeaExpress operates four routes for ferries and boats that originate from the ferry terminal in Hamilton. The "Blue Route" services the West End and the Dockyard of Sandys, the "Orange Route" links to the Dockyard and St. George's, the "Green Route" travels to Rockaway of Southampton, and the "Pink Route" brings passengers to points in Paget and Warwick. Fare for travelling by ferry is inexpensive, and allow travel for frequent travel at most hours. In 2003, high-speed catamaran ferry service was introduced.

== Private cars and taxis ==
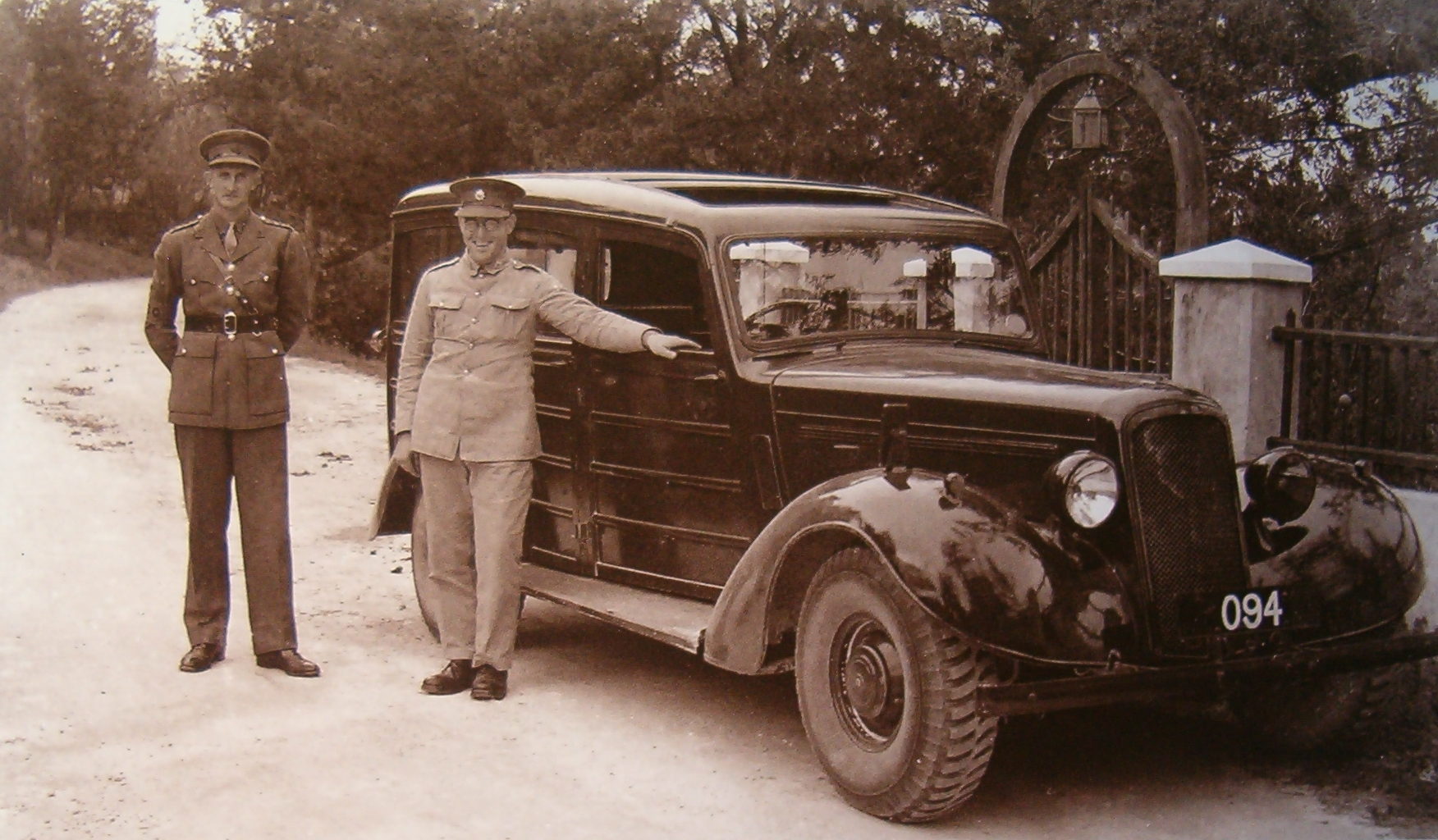
Soldiers with a military motor car in Bermuda in 1942

Although exception was made for the armed forces during the Second World War, motor vehicles, including private cars, were banned from Bermuda's public roads until 1946, when motor taxis were permitted as the tourism industry restarted following the war, with the general ban on motor vehicles lifted in 1948. Today, Bermuda has a large number of private cars, almost one for every two inhabitants; however, only residents are allowed to drive them. This is largely because, with close to 300,000 visitors a year, allowing car rental on one of the world's most densely populated islands would quickly bring traffic to a standstill, as well as bankrupt the island's taxi industry. Car prices are much higher than in the United States, Canada, and Europe, due to heavy import duties, and residents are also limited to one car per household. The size of cars is also restricted (due to the narrow and winding roads on Bermuda), meaning that many models popular in the United States, Canada, and Europe are not available in Bermuda. Only the Governor and Premier are exempt from these restrictions.

Visitors may only rent small two-seat electric cars or low-power motor scooters; there are no other rental vehicles available; they may also use the extensive public bus system, or take taxis. The highest speed limit anywhere on the island is 35 km/h (approximately 22 mph), and it is lower in built-up and other congested areas.

== Railways ==
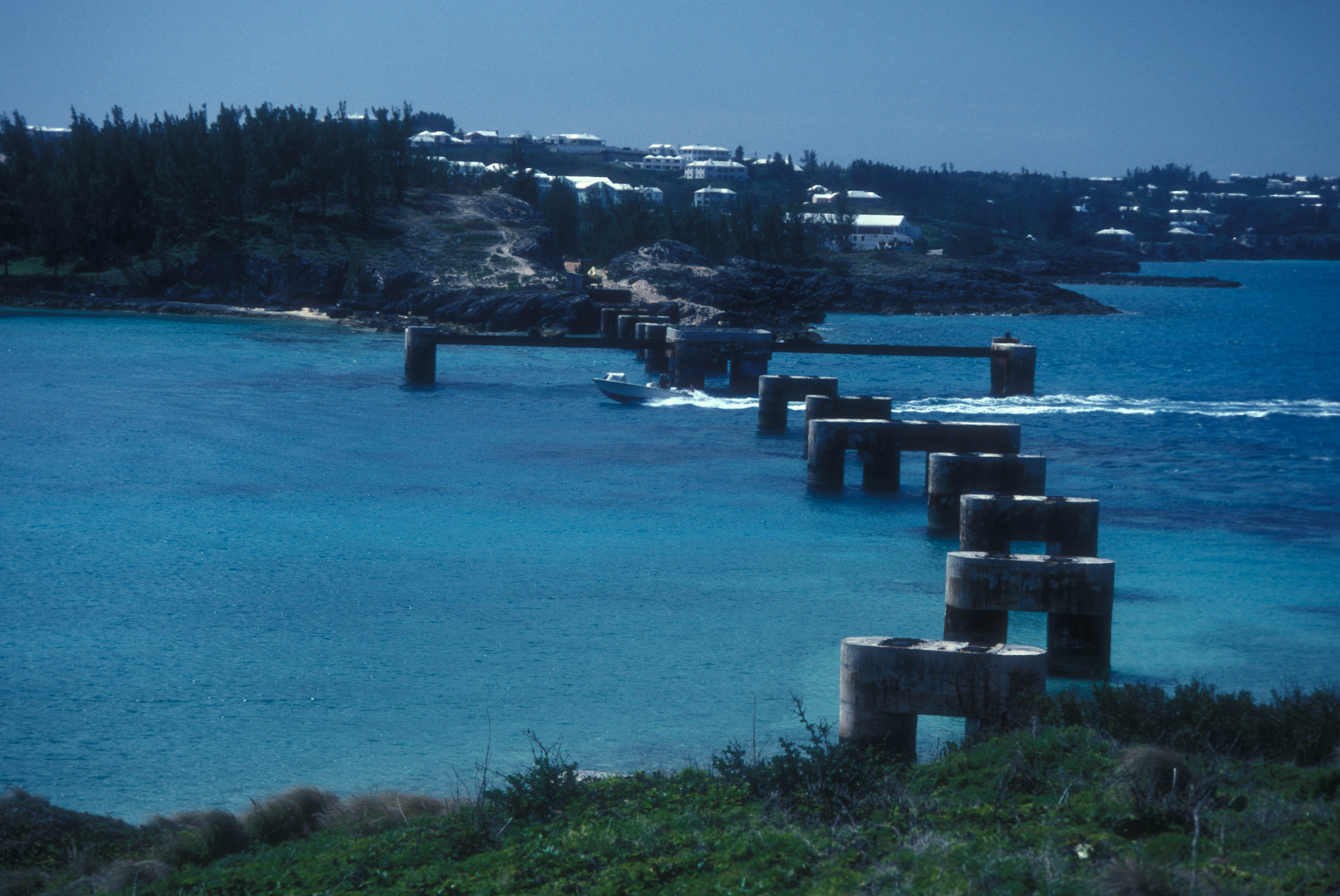
Remaining piers of one of the railway's bridges

Between 1931 and 1948, Bermuda Railway provided rail passenger and freight services between St George's and Somerset in Sandys Parish, via Hamilton. The railway was replaced by a bus service and the line dismantled in 1948. Much of the old railway right-of-way has been converted to the "Bermuda Railway Trail" for hiking and biking.

== Roadways ==
As at 2007, Bermuda had 447 km (278 mi) of paved roads—of which 225 km (140 mi) were public roads and 222 km (138 mi) were private paved roads.

== Ports and harbours ==
There are ports in Hamilton, St George's, and Dockyard (in Sandys Parish). During summer months, large cruise ships dock at the Dockyard (which cruise lines call King's Wharf) at the northwestern end of the island.

== Airport ==
The only airport in Bermuda is L.F. Wade International Airport (formerly named Bermuda International Airport) located in the parish of St. George's, 11 km (6.8 mi) northeast of Hamilton. In 2006, the airport handled about 900,000 passengers. It has one passenger terminal, one cargo terminal, eight aircraft stands and can support all aircraft sizes up to the Airbus A380. As at 2006, seven airlines operated seasonal or year-round scheduled services to Bermuda from Canada, the United Kingdom, and the United States. It has a 3,048 m (10,000 ft) paved runway.

The airport is served by a public bus service and taxis. There is no car hire (car rental) in Bermuda.

== Merchant marine ==
Bermuda is a flag of convenience, with 160 vessels on its registry as at 2016.
