= Evans Lake (Okanogan County, Washington) =

- Location within Washington (state)
- Location: Okanogan County, Washington
- Coordinates: 48°30′41″N 119°34′23″W
- Type: lake
- Basin countries: United States
- Surface elevation: 1,745 ft (532 m)

Evans Lake is a lake in the U.S. state of Washington.

Evans Lake was named after Berry Evans, a pioneer who settled the area.

== See also ==
- List of lakes in Washington
