= Justice Evans =

Justice Evans may refer to:

- A. A. Evans (1862–1935), associate justice of the Alabama Supreme Court
- Beverly Daniel Evans Jr. (1865–1922), associate justice of the Supreme Court of Georgia
- Gregory Evans (judge) (1913–2010), chief justice of the High Court of Ontario
- John Evans (judge) (1728–1783), associate justice of the Supreme Court of Pennsylvania
- Kelli Evans (born 1968/69), associate justice of the Supreme Court of California
- Lemuel D. Evans (1810–1877), associate justice of the Supreme Court of Texas
- Richard Evans (judge) (1777–1816), associate justice of the New Hampshire Supreme Court
- Robert E. Evans (1856–1925), associate justice of the Nebraska Supreme Court
- William D. Evans (1852–1936), associate justice of the Iowa Supreme Court

== See also ==
- Judge Evans (disambiguation)
