= Evans Lake (Ohio) =

Lake in Ohio, United States

- Location within Ohio Location within the United States
- Location: New Springfield, Ohio
- Coordinates: 40°58′52″N 80°37′07″W
- Type: Private
- Basin countries: United States
- Surface area: 566 acres (229 ha)
- Surface elevation: 1,071 ft (326 m)
- Islands: none

Evans Lake is a private lake in southeastern Mahoning County, Ohio, owned by Aqua Ohio, a subsidiary of Aqua America (formerly Consumers Ohio Water Company). It is located about five miles from the Pennsylvania border at an elevation of 1,071 feet. At normal levels, it has a surface area of 582 acres. Evans Lake was created in 1948 when construction was completed on the Evans Lake Dam on Yellow Creek. The lake is used for drinking water, fishing and recreation.
