= Bermuda Railway =

Railway line in Bermuda

Coordinates: 32°21′32″N 64°42′57″W

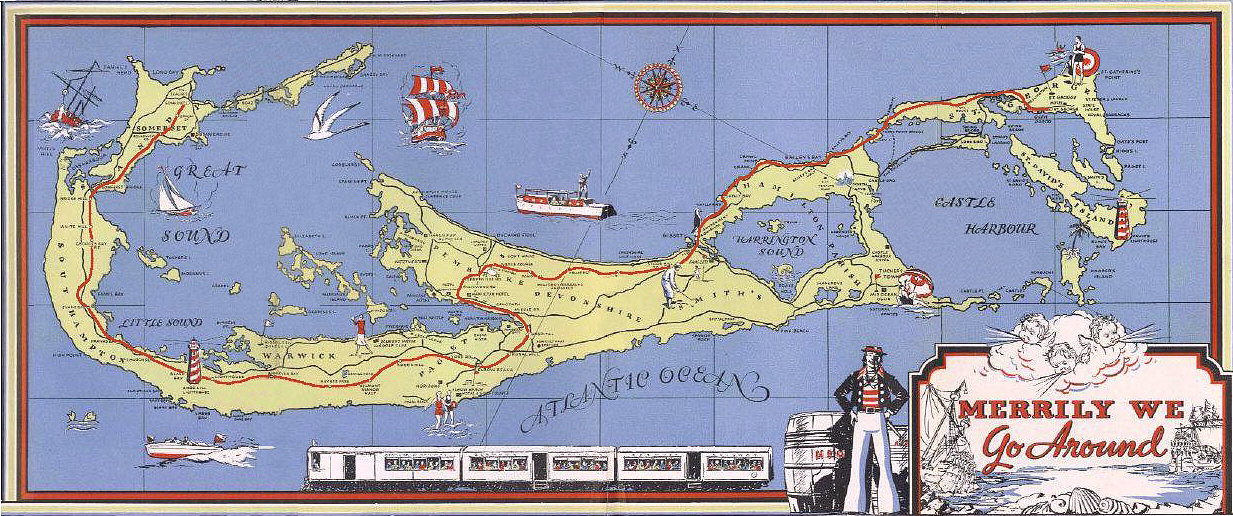
- Bermuda Railway (in red) between St. George's, Hamilton, and Somerset in Sandys Parish

Overview
- Status: Partially converted to rail trail
- Locale: Bermuda
- Termini: St. George's; Somerset

Service
- Type: Common carrier
- Services: 2
- Depot(s): Hamilton

History
- Opened: 31 October 1931
- Closed: 1 May 1948

Technical
- Line length: 21.7 mi (34.9 km)
- Track gauge: 1,435 mm (4 ft 8 1/2 in) standard gauge

The Bermuda Railway was a 21.7-mile (34.9 km) common carrier line that operated in Bermuda for a brief period (31 October 1931 – 1 May 1948). In its 17 years of existence, the railway provided frequent passenger and freight service over its length spanning most of the archipelago from St. George's in the east to Somerset, Sandys Parish, in the west.

Construction and maintenance proved to be exceedingly costly, as the Bermuda Railway was built along a coastal route to minimize the amount of land acquisition needed for the right of way. In so doing, however, extensive trestles and bridgework were necessary. More than 10 percent of the line was elevated on 33 separate structures of timber or steel construction spanning the ocean. In addition, the proximity to the ocean made rot and corrosion a significant problem. This, along with the introduction of private automobiles to the island after World War II, would ultimately doom the line.

== Construction ==
The Bermuda Railway was a single-track, standard-gauge line with 14 passing sidings. Construction began in 1926, two years after the Bermuda government granted a 40-year charter to the Bermuda Railway Company, but was not completed until 1931. The initial cost of construction and rolling stock purchase was about B$40 million (adjusted for inflation to dollars as of 2008), a staggering sum for such a short line with limited revenue potential. It was said to be one of the most expensive rail lines built, at a cost-per-mile of B$2 million.

== Operation and equipment ==
A westbound Bermuda Railway train on one of the line's many coastal bridges, c. 1940s, illustrating the line's construction and maintenance difficulties

Rolling stock consisted of gasoline-powered passenger coaches built by Drewry Car Co. in England in 1929–1931, including eight self-propelled coaches powered by 120 horsepower (89 kW) petrol engines and six first-class cars. The new venture also acquired a few freight cars and, during World War II, two diesel locomotives imported from the United States. Two classes of passenger accommodations were offered: first-class or "Pullman", with individual wicker chairs, and standard coaches, called "toast racks" because of their walkover seats (that is, the seat backs can be moved across the seat to face either direction of travel).

Regular passenger service began between Hamilton and Somerset on 31 October 1931, operating from 6 a.m. to midnight at one- to two-hour intervals, depending on the time of day. Operations began between Hamilton and St George on 19 December 1931. Bermuda Railway trains were widely used in the 1930s by commuters, schoolchildren, and shoppers, as private automobiles were not allowed in Bermuda until 1946. Tourists in particular enjoyed the spectacularly scenic ride alongside the ocean's edge and through Bermuda's flower-covered hills. Special sightseeing excursions were run for cruise ship passengers.

Following heavy usage by U.S. and British armed forces during World War II resulting from the influx of military personnel and the build-up of naval and air force facilities in Bermuda, the railway's fortunes rapidly declined after war's end. The large number of wooden trestles were found to have deteriorated significantly. Meanwhile, passenger volume fell by more than half between 1946 and 1947 on the "Rattle and Shake", as the line came to be known, due to patrons switching to automobile travel.

The cost of infrastructure rehabilitation, combined with falling passenger levels and ever-increasing deficits, led the government to conclude that the Bermuda Railway should be abandoned in favour of bus service. After 17 years of operation, the last train ran on 1 May 1948. The rolling stock was later shipped to British Guiana (now Guyana), where they continued to run for several more years in the 1950s.

== Legacy ==
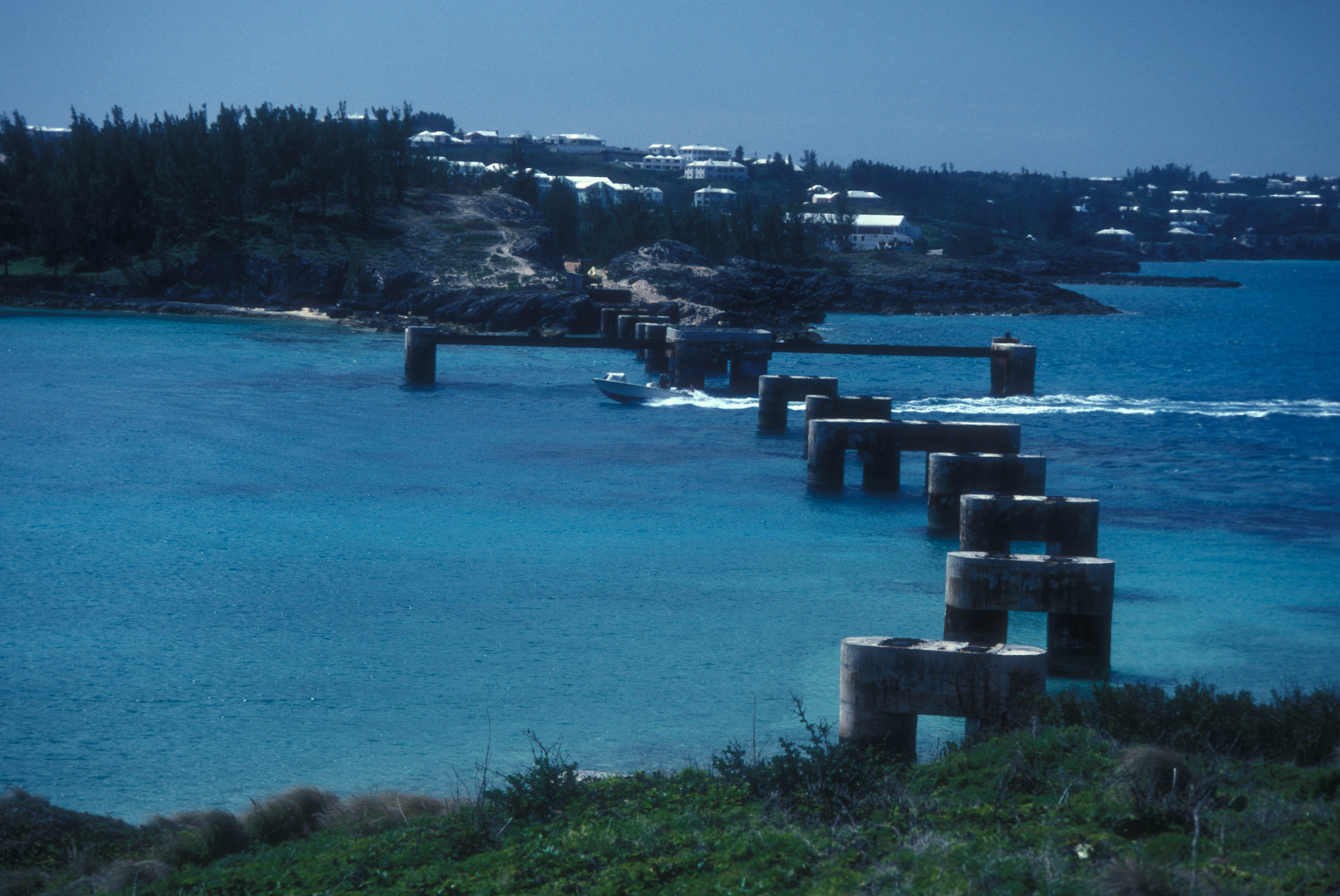
Remaining piers of one of the railway's bridges

In 1984, 18 miles (29 km) of the defunct rail line's right-of-way were dedicated as the Bermuda Railway Trail for hiking and, on some paved portions, biking. The Bermuda Tourism Department publishes a pamphlet describing the Trail's highlights, which Frommer's travel guide calls one of its "Favorite Bermuda Experiences", extolling its "panoramic seascapes, exotic flora and fauna, and soothing sounds of the island's bird life".

A small Bermuda Railway museum operated in the old Aquarium Railway Station, just east of Flatts Village. The museum closed shortly before the death of the owner in 2011.

In 2015, The Railway Magazine reported that two of the former Bermuda Railway freight cars still existed in Georgetown, Guyana, prompting calls for their possible restoration and future exhibit in Bermuda.

== See also ==
- Transport in Bermuda
