= Evans Creek (Peters Creek tributary) =

River in California, United States

Coordinates: 37.260499°N 122.214133°W

Evans Creek is a tributary of Peters Creek in San Mateo County, California.

== See also ==
- List of rivers of California
- List of watercourses in the San Francisco Bay Area
