= Evans Creek (Tuscarawas River tributary) =

Stream in Coshocton and Tuscarawas County, Ohio, U.S.

Coordinates: 40°17′12″N 81°41′19″W

Evans Creek is a stream in Coshocton and Tuscarawas counties in the U.S. state of Ohio. It is a tributary of the Tuscarawas River.

Evans Creek was named for Isaac Evans, who built a sawmill there.

== See also ==
- List of rivers of Ohio
