= Irwin (surname) =

Irwin is an Irish, Scottish, and English surname stemming from the surname Eoforwine, a combination of the Old English words for boar and friend. Notable people with the surname include:

- Alexander Irwin (died 1752), British Army officer
- Alexander J. Irwin (1799–1843), United States territorial legislator
- Andy Offutt Irwin, American storyteller and singer/songwriter
- Arthur Irwin (1858–1921), Canadian-American shortstop and manager in Major League Baseball
- Ashton Irwin (born 1994), Australian drummer in the band 5 Seconds of Summer
- Bill Irwin (wrestler), professional wrestler
- Bill Irwin (born 1950), American actor and clown
- Cecil Irwin (musician) (1902–1935), American jazz reed player and arranger
- Cecil Irwin (footballer) (1942–2025), English footballer
- Charles Irwin (disambiguation), several people
- Clint Irwin (born 1989), American soccer goalkeeper
- Denis Irwin (born 1965), Irish footballer
- Dennis Irwin (1951–2008), American jazz musician
- Elaine Irwin, American supermodel and spokeswoman for Almay Cosmetics
- Francis Xavier Irwin (1934–2019), American Roman Catholic bishop
- Frederick Irwin (1788–1860), acting Governor of Western Australia
- George Rankine Irwin (1907–1998), American scientist specializing in fracture mechanics
- Hale Irwin (born 1945), American golfer
- Hannah Irwin (born 1998), Northern Irish athlete
- Heath Irwin (born 1973), American football player (nephew of Hale)
- Herbert Carmichael Irwin (1894–1930), Irish-born aviator and athlete
- Inez Haynes Irwin (1873–1970), American feminist author
- J. David Irwin, electrical engineering educator
- James Irwin (disambiguation), several people
- James Bruce Irwin (1921–2012), New Zealand botanist
- Sir James Murray Irwin (1858–1938), British Army doctor who served in Sudan, the Boer War and the Great War
- Jared Irwin (1750–1818), Governor of Georgia
- Jeff Irwin, American musician
- Jennifer Irwin (born 1975), Canadian actress
- John N. Irwin (1844–1905), American politician and Governor of Idaho Territory (1883) and Arizona Territory (1890–1892)
- John Rice Irwin (1930–2022), American cultural historian
- John N. Irwin, II (1913–2000), American diplomat
- Jonnie Irwin (1973–2024), English television presenter and property consultant
- Josephine Irwin (1890–1984), American suffragist
- Julia Irwin, Australian politician
- Julienne Irwin, American singer
- Kenny Irwin Jr. (1969–2000), American racing driver
- Les Irwin (1898–1985), Australian politician
- Lew Irwin, radio broadcaster and founder of The Credibility Gap
- Malcolm Robert Irwin (1897–1987), American immunogeneticist
- Mark Irwin (born 1950), Canadian cinematographer
- Matt Irwin (born 1987), Canadian ice hockey player
- May Irwin (1862–1938), actress, singer and major star of vaudeville
- Michael Irwin (disambiguation), several people
- Noel Irwin (1892–1972), British World War II general
- Pat Irwin, (born 1955) American composer and musician
- Pat Irwin, (1921–1999), Oklahoma judge
- Patrick H. Irwin (1837–1908), American civil engineer and surveyor
- Robert Irwin (disambiguation), several people
- Ron Irwin (1936–2020), Canadian politician
- Scott Irwin, professional wrestler and brother of Bill Irwin
- Steve Irwin (1962–2006), Australian conservationist and television personality
  - Bob Irwin (born 1939), Steve's father, Australian naturalist
  - Terri Irwin (born 1964), Steve's widow, American-born naturalist
  - Bindi Irwin (born 1998), Steve and Terri's daughter, Australian television personality
  - Robert Irwin (born 2003), Steve and Terri's son, Australian conservationist and television personality
- Steve Irwin, Australian rugby league footballer
- Stu Irwin (1903–1967), American actor
- Trenton Irwin (born 1995), American football player
- William Irwin (disambiguation), various people named William or Bill Irwin
- E. F. L. Wood, 1st Earl of Halifax, created Baron Irwin in 1926

== See also ==
- Baron Irwin
- Earvin
- Ervin (disambiguation)
- Ervine
- Erving (disambiguation)
- Erwan
- Erwin (disambiguation)
- Irmin (disambiguation)
- Irvin
- Irvine (disambiguation)
- Irving (disambiguation)
- Irwin (disambiguation)
- Irwin (given name)
