= Irving (name) =

Irving is an originally Scottish surname, a variant of the name Irvine, which is derived from the eponymous River Irvine (Scottish Gaelic: Irbhinn) in Dumfriesshire. Irving is also used as a male given name.

Notable people with the name include:

== Surname ==
- Amy Irving (born 1953), American film and stage actress
- Arthur Irving (1930–2024), Canadian industrialist, son of K.C. Irving
- Birk Irving (born 1999), American freestyle skier
- Bob Irving (sportscaster) (born 1950), Canadian sportscaster
- Bud Irving (1926–2024), Canadian football player
- Charles Irving (surgeon) (?–1794?), Scottish naval surgeon, inventor and colonial entrepreneur
- Clifford Irving (1930–2017), American author who created a hoax autobiography of Howard Hughes
- Dan Irving (1854–1924), British politician, Labour MP
- David Irving (born 1938), British writer, best known for his denial of the Holocaust
- David Irving (footballer) (born 1951), British footballer
- Edmund George Irving (1910–1990), British naval hydrographer
- Edward Irving (1792–1834), Scottish clergyman
- Edward Irving (plant collector) (1816–1855), Scottish surgeon
- Edward A. Irving (1927–2014), Canadian geologist
- Francis Irving (born 1974), British programmer and activist for freedom of information
- George S. Irving, (1922–2016), American actor
- Godfrey Irving (1867–1937), senior Australian Army officer
- Gordon Budd Irving (1898–1918), Canadian World War I flying ace
- Henry Irving (1838–1905), British actor
- Isabel Irving (1871–1944), American actress
- James K. Irving (1928–2024), Canadian industrialist, son of K.C. Irving
- Jayne Irving (born 1956), British television presenter
- John Irving (disambiguation), several people
- Jules Irving (1925–1979), American actor, director, educator, and producer,
- K. C. Irving (Kenneth Colin Irving, 1899–1992), Canadian industrialist, founder of the Irving Group of Companies
- Kyrie Irving (born 1992), American professional basketball player
- Levin Thomas Handy Irving (1828–1892), justice of the Maryland Court of Appeals
- Martin Howy Irving (1831–1912), English rower and educationist in Australia; father of Godfrey Irving
- Mary Jane Irving (1913–1983), American actress
- Nicholas Irving (born 1986), American author and former soldier
- Robert Irving (disambiguation), several people
- Skylar Irving (born 2002), American ice hockey player
- Svea Irving (born 2002), American freestyle skier
- Thomas Ballantyne Irving (1914–2002), publisher of the first American English translation of the Qur'an
- Thomas Irving (Medal of Honor) (1842–?)
- Washington Irving (1783–1859), American author, historian and diplomat
- William Irving (disambiguation), several people

== Given name ==
- Irving Abella (1940–2022), Canadian writer
- Irving Amen (1918–2011), printmaker
- Irving Azoff (born 1947), American music executive and manager
- Irving Berlin (1888–1989), Russian-born American songwriter
- Irving Block, American matte painter and screenwriter, wrote the story on which Forbidden Planet was based.
- Irving Caesar (1895–1996), American lyricist
- Irving D. Chais (1925–2009), American businessman
- Irving Chernev (1900–1981), Russian-American chess player and author
- Irving Copi (1917–2002), American philosopher
- Irving Cottler (1918–1989), American drummer
- Irving Crane (1913–2001), American pool player
- Irving Dardik (1936–2023), American surgeon
- Irving Davidson (1929–2022), Australian rules footballer
- Irving Davis (1896–1958), American footballer
- Irving Fein (1911–2012), American television and film producer
- Irving Feinstein (1910–1939), American mobster
- Irving Feldman (born 1928), American poet
- Irving Fields (1915–2016), American pianist
- Irving Fine (1914–1962), American composer
- Irving Finkel (born 1951), British philologist and Assyriologist, curator in the Middle East department of the British Museum
- Irving Fisher (1867–1947), American economist
- Irving Folwartshny (1914–1994), American athlete
- Irving Freese (1903–1964), Mayor of Norwalk, Connecticut
- Irving Garcia (soccer, born 1988) (born 1988), American footballer
- Irving Garcia (boxer) (born 1979), Puerto Rican boxer
- Irving Gill (1870–1936), American architect
- Irving Goff (1900–1989),
- Irving Goldman (1911–2012), American anthropologist
- Irving B. Goldman (1898–1975), American otolaryngologist
- Irving Gottesman (1930–2016), American psychologist
- Irving Gould (1919–2004), Canadian businessman
- Irving Green (1916–2006), American record industry executive
- Irving Harper (1916–2015), American industrial designer
- Irving Hexham (born 1943), English-Canadian academic and writer
- Irving Howe (1920–1993), Jewish-American literary critic
- Irving Janis (1918–1990), American psychologist
- Irving Johnson (1905–1991), American adventurer and author
- Irving Kane Pond (1857–1939), American architect
- Irving Kaplan (government official)
- Irving Kaplan (chemist) (1913–1997), American chemist
- Irving Kaplan (radiation oncologist), American radiation oncologist
- Irving Kaplansky (1917–2006), mathematician
- Irving Kaplan (chemist) (1913–1997), an MIT professor
- Irving Langmuir (1881–1957), chemist and physicist and winner of the 1932 Nobel Prize for Chemistry
- Irving Lavin (1927–2019), American art historian
- Irving R. Levine (1922–2009), broadcast journalist
- Irving Layton (1912–2006), Canadian poet
- Irving Lehman (1876–1945), American lawyer and Jewish politician
- Irving Lerner (1909–1976), American filmmaker
- Irving Lowens (1916–1983), American musicologist and critic
- Irving Malin (1934–2014), American literary critic
- Irving Martin (born 1940s), American record producer
- Irving Mansfield (1908–1988), American producer and writer
- Irving Mills (1894–1985), American music publisher
- Irving Millman (1923–2012), American virologist and microbiologist
- Irving Mondschein (1924–2015), track and field champion
- Irving Morrow (1884–1952), American architect
- Irving Moskowitz (1928–2016), American physician, businessman, and philanthropist
- Irving Mosberg (1908–1973), New York politician and judge
- Irving Nattrass (born 1952), English footballer
- Irving D. Neustein (1901–1979), American lawyer and politician
- Irving Penn (1917–2009), American photographer
- Irving Peress (1917–2014), American dentist and military officer who became of the target of Army–McCarthy hearings
- Irving Henry Webster Phillips Sr. (1920–1993), American photojournalist
- Irving S. Reed (1923–2012), American mathematician and engineer
- Irving Reiner (1924–1986), American mathematician
- Irving "Ving" Rhames (born 1959), American actor
- Irv Rubin (Irving David Rubin) (1945–2002), former Jewish Defense League leader
- Irving Sablosky (1924–2016), American diplomat
- Irving Saladino (born 1983), Panamanian long jumper
- Irving Sandler (1925–2018), American art critic and art historian
- Irving Saraf (1932–2012), Polish-born American film producer
- Irving Sayles (1872–1914), African-American vaudeville entertainer
- Irving H. Saypol (1905–1977), American attorney
- Irving Schwartz (1929–2010), Canadian businessman
- Irving Selikoff (1915–1992), American physician
- Irving Slosberg (born 1947), American politician
- Irving Stern (1928–2023), American politician
- Irving Stone (1903–1989), American writer
- Irving Stowe (1915–1974), American lawyer
- Irving Taylor (songwriter) (1914–1983), American songwriter
- Irving Taylor (ice hockey) (1919–1991), Canadian ice hockey player
- Irving Thalberg (1899–1936), American film producer
- Irving Thalberg, Jr. (1930–1987), American philosopher
- Irving C. Tomlinson (1860–1944), American Universalist minister
- Irving Townsend (1920–1981), American record producer and author
- Irving Vendig, (1902–1995), American soap opera writer
- Irving Wallace (1916–1990), American novelist and non-fiction writer
- Irving B. Weiner, American psychologist
- Irving Zola (1935–1994), American activist and writer
- Irving Zurita (born 1991), Mexican footballer

== See also ==
- Earvin
- Ervin (disambiguation)
- Ervine
- Erving (disambiguation)
- Erwan
- Erwin (disambiguation)
- Irvin
- Irvine (disambiguation)
- Irwin (disambiguation)
