= Irwin (given name) =

Irwin is a given name. Notable people with the name include:

- Irwin Allen (1916–1991), American television and film producer
- Irwin Barker (1952–2016), Canadian comedian and writer
- Irwin Caplan (1919–2007), American cartoonist
- Irwin Chusid (born 1951), American record producer, journalist, and radio personality
- Irwin Cohen (1952–2012), American Olympic judoka
- Irwin Corey (1914–2017), American comic and film actor
- Irwin Cotler (born 1940), former minister of justice and Attorney General of Canada
- Irwin Donenfeld (1951–2004), American comic book publishing executive
- Irwin Edman (1896–1954), American philosopher and professor of philosophy
- Irwin Freedberg, (c. 1933–2005) American professor of dermatology at New York University
- Irwin Glusker (1924–2022), American art director
- Irwin Goodman (1943–1991), Finnish singer
- Irwin Hasen (1918–2015), American cartoonist
- Irwin Hoffman (1924–2018), American conductor
- Irwin M. Jacobs (born 1933), American electrical engineer
- Irwin Kra (born 1937), American mathematician
- Irwin Kula (born 1957), American rabbi and author
- Irwin Lachman (1930–2025), American engineer
- Irwin Lampert, Canadian judge
- Irwin McIntosh (1926–1988), Canadian politician
- Irwin S. Moise (1906–1984), American lawyer and judge
- Irwin Molasky (1927–2020), American real estate developer and philanthropist
- Irwin Rose (1926–2015), American biologist, co-recipient of the 2004 Nobel Prize in Chemistry
- Irwin Schiff (1928–2015), American tax protester
- Irwin Shaw (1913–1984), American playwright, screenwriter and author
- Irwin Silber (1925–2010), American writer
- Irwin Stelzer (born 1932), American economist and business columnist
- Irwin Stone (1907–1984), American biochemist, chemical engineer, and author
- Irwin Thomas (born 1971), Australian singer
- Irwin Weiner, Chicagoan mobster
- Irwin Welber (1924–2016), American electrical engineer
- Irwin Winkler (born 1931), American film producer and director
- Irwin Yablans (born 1934), American film producer and distributor

Fictional characters

- Irwin (Billy and Mandy), a character from The Grim Adventures of Billy and Mandy
- Irwin Lapsey, a character from the 1981 musical satire film Shock Treatment
- Irwin R. Schyster, professional wrestling IRS agent gimmick portrayed by wrestler Mike Rotunda

== See also ==
- Earvin
- Ervin (disambiguation)
- Ervine
- Erving (disambiguation)
- Erwan
- Erwin (disambiguation)
- Irmin (disambiguation)
- Irvin
- Irvine (disambiguation)
- Irving (disambiguation)
- Irwin (disambiguation)
- Irwin (surname)
