= Ervin (surname) =

Ervin is a surname. Notable people with the name include:

- Andrew Ervin (born 1971), American novelist and critic
- Anthony Ervin (born 1981), American swimmer
- Bill Ervin, retired NASCAR Grand National Series driver
- Booker Ervin (1930–1970), American musician
- Clark Ervin, American government official
- David Ervin (born 1961), American musician
- Doug Ervin, American politician
- Frank Ervin (1904–1991), American harness racing driver and trainer
- Frankie Ervin (1926–2009), American musician
- Gary Ervin (born 1983), American basketball player
- Howard M. Ervin (1915–2009), American scholar and pastor
- James Ervin (politician) (1778–1841), American politician
- Jason Ervin, American politician
- Joe Michael Ervin (1951–1981), American serial killer
- Joseph Wilson Ervin (1901–1945), American politician
- Lauren Ervin (born 1985), American basketball player
- Lisa Ervin (born 1977), American former figure skater
- Lorenzo Kom'boa Ervin (born 1947), African-American activist
- Mallory Ervin (born 1985), American beauty pageant winner
- Phillip Ervin (born 1992), American baseball player
- Richard Ervin (1905–2004), American jurist
- Robert Tait Ervin (1863–1949), American jurist
- S. H. Ervin (1881-1977), Australian philanthropist
- Sam Ervin (1896–1985), American politician
- Sam J. Ervin IV (born 1955), American jurist
- Samuel James Ervin III (1926–1999), American jurist
- Tom Ervin (born 1952), American attorney and politician
- Tyler Ervin (born 1993), American football player
- William S. Ervin (1886-1951), American lawyer and politician
- Winfield Ervin, Jr. (1902–1985), American politician
- Bob Ervin (1933-2017), American Aviator and War Hero
- Brent Patrick Ervin (1962-2024), American Precision Machinist

== See also ==
- Earvin
- Ervin (disambiguation)
- Ervin (given name)
- Ervine
- Erving (disambiguation)
- Erwan
- Erwin (disambiguation)
- Irvin
- Irvine
- Irving (disambiguation)
- Irwin (disambiguation)
