= Urwin =

Urwin is a surname. Notable people with the surname include:

- Graham Urwin (born 1949), English footballer
- Greg Urwin (1946–2008), Australian politician
- Harry Urwin (1915–1996), British trade unionist
- Lindsay Urwin (born 1956), Australian bishop
- Thomas Urwin (disambiguation), multiple people

== See also ==
- Urwin's Store
- Erwin (disambiguation)
- Irwin (surname)
- Urwan, village in the Indian state of Jharkhand
