= Irv =

Irv is a diminutive form (hypocorism) of the masculine given names Irving, Irvin, Irvine, etc. It may refer to:

- Irvin Irv Anderson (1923–2008), American politician
- Irving Irv Comp (1919–1989), American National Football League player
- Irv Constantine (1907–1966), American National Football League player
- Irving Cottler (1918–1989), American drummer
- Irvin Irv Cross (1939–2021), American sportscaster and former National Football League player
- Irvin Irv Eatman (born 1961), American former National Football League and United States Football League player
- Irvine Irv Frew (1907–1995), Scottish-born Canadian National Hockey League player
- Irving Irv Goode (born 1940), American former National Football League player
- Irv Gotti (born 1970), American hip hop and R&B record producer born Irving Domingo Lorenzo, Jr.
- H. Irving Grousbeck (born 1934), American entrepreneur, Stanford Business School professor and co-owner of the Boston Celtics National Basketball Association franchise
- Irving Irv Kluger (1921–2006), American jazz drummer
- Irving Irv Kupcinet (1912–2003), American newspaper columnist and television talk-show host
- Irv Mondschein (1924–2015), American track and field champion
- Irving Irv Noren (1924–2019), American former Major League Baseball player and coach
- Irving Irv Novick (1916–2004), American comic book artist
- Irvin Irv Pankey (born 1958), American former National Football League player
- Irving Irv Ray (1864–1948), American professional baseball player
- Irvine Irv Robbins (1917–2008), Canadian-born American co-founder of the Baskin-Robbins ice cream parlor chain
- Irwin Irv Rothenberg (1921–2009), American basketball player in the Basketball Association of America (now the National Basketball Association)
- Irving Irv Rubin (1945–2002), Canadian-born American chairman of the Jewish Defense League
- Irvin Irv Smith (born 1971), American former National Football League player
- Irvin Irv Smith Jr. (born 1998), American football player
- James Irvin Irv Spencer (1937–1999), American National Hockey League and World Hockey Association player
- Irving Irv Torgoff (1917–1993), American basketball player in the Basketball Association of America (now the National Basketball Association)
- Irvin Irv Williams (1919–2019), African-American jazz saxophonist and composer
- Irvin Irv Wisniewski (1925–2014), American college basketball and golf head coach
- Irving Irv Young (1877–1935), American Major League Baseball pitcher

== See also ==
- Irvin (name)
- Irvine (name)
- Irving (name)
- Francis Irv (2022–2026), art gallery in New York City
