= IRV =

IRV or Irv or variant, may refer to:

- Incident Response Vehicle, a type of operational vehicle used by police in the United Kingdom
- Instant-runoff voting, a type of ranked preferential voting counting method used in single-seat elections with more than two candidates
- Irvine railway station, North Ayrshire, Scotland (National Rail station code IRV)
- Anton Irv (1886–1919), Estonian soldier
- Irv (given name)

== See also ==
- Irvin
- Irvine (disambiguation)
- Irving (disambiguation)
- Irve (disambiguation)
