= William Irvine =

William, Willie, or Bill Irvine may refer to:

== Academics ==
- William Irvine (historian) (1840–1911), British historian
- William Mann Irvine (1865–1928), American academic
- William D. Irvine (1944-2021), Canadian historian

== Law and politics ==
- William Irvine (Australian politician) (1858–1943), Australian politician from Victoria
- William Irvine (Canadian politician) (1885–1962), Canadian politician from Alberta
- William Irvine (New York politician) (1820–1882), American politician from New York
- William Irvine (Rhodesian politician) (1920–2013), British-born Rhodesian and Zimbabwean politician
- William S. Irvine (1851–1942), American politician from Wisconsin
- William C. Irvine (politician) (1852–1924), American politician from Wyoming

== Religion ==
- William Irvine (bishop) (fl. 1718), Scottish bishop
- William Irvine (Scottish evangelist) (1863–1947) founder of Two by Twos and other sects
- William C. Irvine (missionary) (1871–1946), New Zealand missionary and author

== Sports ==
- William Irvine (rugby union) (1898–1952), New Zealand rugby union player
- Willie Irvine (1943-2025), Northern Ireland footballer
- Willie Irvine (footballer, born 1956), Scottish footballer
- Willie Irvine (footballer, born 1963), Scottish footballer

== Others ==
- William Irvine (soldier) (c. 1298–?), Scottish soldier
- William Irvine (general) (1741–1804), American Revolutionary War general
- William Irvine (chemist) (1743–1787), British doctor and chemist
- William Irvine (1776–1811), Scottish physician
- Bill Irvine (1926–2008), British ballroom dancer

== See also ==
- William Irvin (disambiguation)
- William Irwin (disambiguation)
- William Irving (disambiguation)
