= Irving Kaplan =

Irving Kaplan may refer to:

- Irving Kaplan (government official), official of the United States government, accused of involvement in Soviet espionage
- Irving Kaplan (chemist), American chemist
- Irving D. Kaplan, American radiation oncologist
- Irvin Kaplan, American sports team owner
