= Irvin =

- Pronunciation: In English: /ˈɜːrvɪn/; In Albanian, French, Serbo-Croatian, Spanish: /ˈirvin/
- Gender: Male

Other gender
- Feminine: Irvina

Origin
- Derivation: Old Gaelic: Iruinn (water); B-C-S: Irvas (reindeer)
- Meaning: Freshwater, sea friend, tested and experienced, reindeer, trusty
- Region of origin: Europe

Other names
- Alternative spelling: İrvin (Turkish)
- Variant forms: Ervin; Arvin (آروین)

Irvin is a male given name of Indo-European origin.

In Old Gaelic, the meaning of the name is "freshwater" or "friend of the sea." It can also be used as a variant of Ervin, the Eastern European version of the German name Erwin.

In the Middle East, Arvin (آروین) is the Persian variant of the name, meaning "tested and experienced." Meanwhile, Arfin (عرفين) (earfayn) is the Arabic variant, meaning "trusty." In Arabic, the letter v is absent and is substituted with f.

In the Balkans, particularly in Albania, Bosnia and Herzegovina, and Croatia, the name is used as an alternative to Ervin, the more popular variant in the region, with Irvin being a modern variation of the name. Among the former Yugoslav countries, the name may have been derived from the word irvas, meaning reindeer in Bosnian-Croatian-Serbian. It is used as a male given name in the region, but these countries also have a female equivalent: Irvina (for example, Irvina Bajramović).

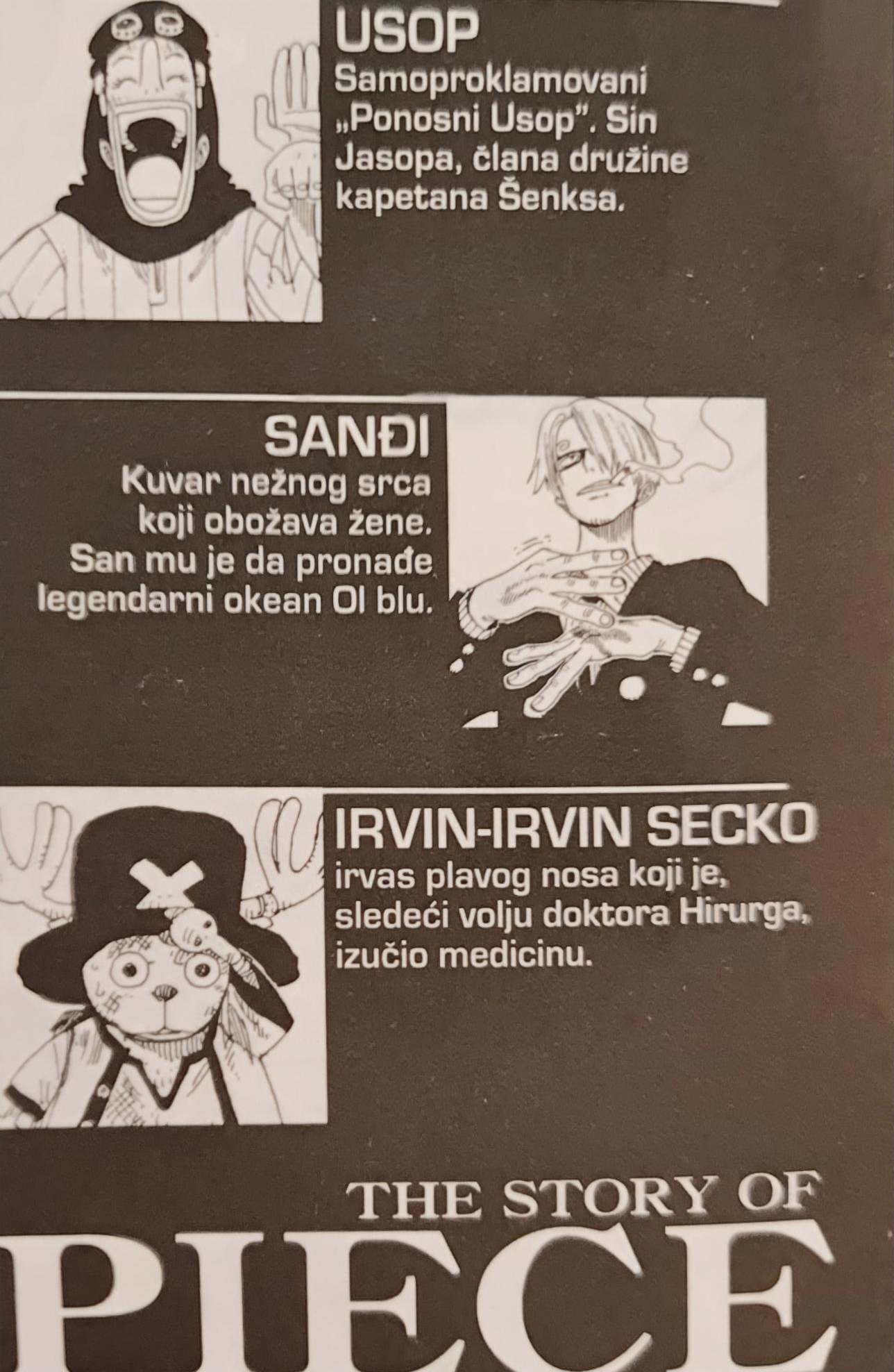
The Japanese manga One Piece features the character Tony Tony Chopper, a human-reindeer hybrid, whose name is translated as Irvin Irvin Secko in Bosnian-Croatian-Serbian publications

The name originated in Europe, but it is also found in Asia, North America, and South America. It is especially popular in Indonesia, where both the male version (Irvin) and the female version (Irvina) are used.

== Given name ==
- Irvin William Akerley (1904–1995), Canadian politician
- Irvin Alberti (born 1983), Dominican actor and humorist
- Irvin Barraclough (1927–2007), English rugby league footballer
- Irvin Baxter Jr. (1945–2020), American minister
- Irvin Bertrand (born 2000), French table tennis player
- Irvin Bomb (born 1967), American painter
- Irvin Borish (1913–2012), American optometrist
- Irvin J. Borowsky (1924–2014), American publisher
- Irvin Brooks (1891–1966), American baseball player
- Irvin Brown (1935–2005), English footballer
- Irvin Buhlalu (born 1974), South African boxer
- Irvin Cardona (born 1997), French footballer
- Irvin Castille (1926–2015), American baseball player
- Irvin Charles (born 1997), American football player
- Irvin S. Cobb (1876–1944), American author
- Irvin Cohen (1917–1955), American mathematician
- Irvin M. Cohen (1922–2019), American psychiatrist
- Irvin Dorfman (1924–2006), American tennis player
- Irvin Duguid (born 1969), Scottish musician
- Irvin Ehrenpreis (1920–1985), American literary scholar
- Irvin A. Etler (1931–2020), American football player and coach
- Irvin Faust (1924–2012), American novelist
- Irvin Feld (1918–1984), American impresario
- Irvin Flores (1924–1994), Puerto Rican political activist and nationalist
- Irvin Gernon (born 1962), English footballer
- Irvin Head (1956–2022), Cree and Métis sculptor
- Irvin Herrera (born 1991), Salvadoran footballer
- Irvin Hušić (born 1982), Bosnian racing cyclist
- Irvin Iffla (1924–2012), Jamaican cricketer
- Irvin Jim (born 1968), South African trade union leader
- Irvin Kaplan (1927–1994), American businessman
- Irvin Kershner (1923–2010), American film director
- Irvin van Kerwel (born 1963), South African cricket umpire
- Irvin Khoza (born 1948), South African sports administrator
- Irvin Kipper (1916–2016), American bomber pilot and businessman
- Irvin "Zabo" Koszewski (1922–2009), American bodybuilder of Polish descent
- Irvin Latić (born 2002), Luxembourgish footballer of Bosnian descent
- Irvin Capers Lord (1827–1914), industrialist and mayor of Houston
- Irvin Lukežić (born 1961), Croatian author
- Irvin Masličić (born 1981), Montenegrin artist
- Irvin Leigh Matus (1941–2011), American scholar and autodidact
- Irvin Mayfield (born 1977), American jazz musician
- Irvin McDowell (1818–1885), American soldier
- Irvin Mhlambi (born 1984), South African footballer
- Irvin C. Miller (1884–1974), American actor and playwright
- Irvin C. Mollison (1898–1962), American judge
- Irvin Morris (born 1958), Navajo Nation author and professor
- Irvin Mujčić (born 1987), Bosnian human rights activist and survivor of the Srebrenica genocide
- Irvin Museng (born 1991), Indonesian footballer
- Irvin B. Nathan (born 1943), American lawyer
- Irvin Parra (born 1993), American soccer player
- Irvin Pelletier (born 1946), Canadian politician and notary
- Irvin S. Pepper (1876–1913), American politician
- Irvin Phillips (born 1960), American football player
- Irvin Randle (born 1961), American teacher and fashion model
- Irvin Reid (born 1941), American academic
- Irvin Reyna (born 1987), Honduran footballer
- Irvin Rock (1922-1995), American experimental psychologist
- Irvin Rockman (1938–2010), Australian politician
- Irvin E. Rockwell (1862–1952), American politician
- İrvin Cemil Schick (born 1955), Turkish cultural historian of Islam with a focus on the early modern Ottoman Empire
- Irvin Servold (born 1932), Canadian Nordic combined and cross-country skier
- Irvin Shapiro (1906–1989), American film distributor
- Irvin Smith (born 1967), American gridiron football player
- Irvin Stokes (1926–2007), American jazz musician
- Irvin Studer (1900–1997), Canadian politician
- Irvin Studin (born 1976), Italian-Canadian academic and former footballer
- Irvin Tahmaz (born 1976), Bosnian long jumper
- Irvin Ternström (1909–1975), Swedish sprinter
- Irvin Thompson (1893–1934), American outlaw known as Blackie Thompson
- Irvin Ungar (born 1948), American former pulpit rabbi and antiquarian bookseller
- Irvin Valdez (born 1991), Salvadoran footballer
- Irvin Venyš (born 1981), Czech clarinetist
- Irvin Warrican (1965–2022), Vincentian cricketer
- Irvin F. Westheimer (1879–1980), American businessman and philanthropist
- Irvin Williams (1926–2018), American gardener
- Irvin Willat (1890–1976), American film director
- Irvin D. Yalom (born 1931), American existential psychiatrist and author
- Irvin Yeaworth (1926–2004), German film director

== Surname ==
- Britt Irvin (born 1984), Canadian actress
- Bruce Irvin (born 1987), American football player
- Cole Irvin (born 1994), American baseball player
- David Irvin (c.1798–1872), justice of the Wisconsin Territorial Supreme Court
- Dick Irvin (1892–1957), Canadian ice hockey player and coach
- Edward A. Irvin (1838–1908), American politician from Pennsylvania
- Fanny M. Irvin (1854–1929), American suffragist
- Jake Irvin (born 1997), American baseball player
- James Irvin (politician) (1800–1862), American politician
- James Irvin (fighter) (born 1978), American mixed martial artist
- John Irvin (1940–2026), English film director
- LeRoy Irvin (1957–2026), American football player
- Leslie Irvin (1895–1966), American parachutist
- Marvin Irvin (born 1949), American serial killer
- Michael Irvin (born 1966), American sports commentator
- Monte Irvin (1919–2016), American baseball player and Hall of Fame inductee
- Rea Irvin (1881–1972), American graphic artist
- Sam Irvin (born 1956), American director and producer
- Tex Irvin (1906–1978), American football player
- Tommy Irvin (1929–2017), American politician
- Virginia Hendrickson Irvin (1904–1992), American painter
- William W. Irvin (1779–1842), Justice of the Supreme Court of Ohio

== See also ==
- Irvine (name)
- Irving (name)
- Ervin (given name)
- Ervin (surname)
- Erwin (disambiguation)
