= Ervin =

Ervin may refer to:

- Ervin (given name)
- Ervin (surname)
- Ervin Township, Howard County, Indiana, one of eleven townships in Howard County, Indiana, USA
- Ervin Industries, a manufacturer based in Ann Arbor, Michigan

== See also ==
- Justice Ervin (disambiguation)
- Earvin
- Ervine
- Erving (disambiguation)
- Erwan
- Erwin (disambiguation)
- Irvin
- Irvine
- Irving (disambiguation)
- Irwin (disambiguation)
