= Husić =

Husić is a Bosnian patronymic surname. Notable people with the surname include:

- Anel Husić (born 2001), Swiss football player
- Ed Husic (born 1970), Australian politician
- Edin Husić (born 1985), Bosnian football player
- Irvin Hušić (born 1982), Bosnian cyclist
- Nedžad Husić (born 2001), Bosnian taekwondo athlete
- Raif Husić (born 1996), Bosnian-German football player
- Ramiz Husić (born 1973), Bosnian football player and manager
- Senad Husić (born 1990), Bosnian football player
