= Ervine =

Ervine is a given name and a surname. Notable people with the name include:

== Given name ==
- Ervine Metzl (1899–1963), American graphic artist and illustrator best known for his posters and postage stamp designs
- Ervine Mosby (1877–1916), English rugby league footballer

== Surname ==
- Brian Ervine (born 1951), playwright, songwriter and teacher living in Belfast, Northern Ireland
- Craig Ervine (born 1985), Zimbabwean international cricketer
- Dale Ervine (born 1964), former U.S. soccer midfielder who spent most of his career playing indoor soccer
- David Ervine (1953–2007), Northern Irish unionist politician and the leader of the Progressive Unionist Party
- Kate Ervine, Canadian political scientist
- Linda Ervine, language rights activist from East Belfast, Northern Ireland
- Sean Ervine (born 1982), Zimbabwean cricketer
- St. John Greer Ervine (1883–1971), Irish author, writer, critic and dramatist
- Marcus Ervine-Andrews (1911–1995), Irish recipient of the Victoria Cross, the highest and most prestigious award for gallantry

== See also ==
- ERV (disambiguation), includes people known as Erv
- Earvin
- Ervin (disambiguation)
- Erving (disambiguation)
- Erwan
- Erwin (disambiguation)
- Irvin
- Irvine (disambiguation)
- Irving (disambiguation)
- Irwin (disambiguation)
- Jervine
