= Mujčić =

Mujčić is a surname. Notable people with the surname include:

- Irvin Mujčić (born 1987), Bosnian human rights activist
- Mirza Mujčić (born 1994), Swedish footballer
