= Irwin =

Irwin may refer to:

== Places ==
United States

- Irwin, California
- Irwin, Idaho
- Irwin, Illinois
- Irwin, Iowa
- Irwin, Nebraska
- Irwin, Ohio
- Irwin, Pennsylvania
- Irwin, South Carolina
- Irwin County, Georgia
- Irwin Township, Venango County, Pennsylvania
- Fort Irwin, California

Australia

- Shire of Irwin, Western Australia

== People ==
- Irwin (given name)
- Irwin (surname)

== Fruit ==
- Irwin (mango), a mango variety from Florida

== Other uses ==
- IRWIN, a painting collective that is a member of Neue Slowenische Kunst
- Irwin 41, an American sailboat design
- Irwin Toy, a Canadian toy manufacturer and distributor
- Irwin Industrial Tools, a subsidiary of Stanley Black & Decker
- Irwin Magnetic Systems, a computer storage manufacturer

== See also ==
- Earvin
- Ervin (disambiguation)
- Ervine
- Erving (disambiguation)
- Erwan
- Erwin (disambiguation)
- Irvin
- Irvine (disambiguation)
- Irving (disambiguation)
