= William Irwin =

William, Will, Bill, or Billy Irwin may refer to:

== Law and politics ==
- William W. Irvin or Irwin (1778–1842), American politician in Ohio
- William W. Irwin (1803–1856), American politician in Pittsburgh, Pennsylvania
- William Irwin (California politician) (1827–1886), American politician in California
- William Irwin (Unionist politician) (born 1956), Unionist politician in Northern Ireland
- Bill Irwin (politician), American politician in Missouri

== Sports ==
- Bill Irwin (baseball) (1859–1933), American baseball player
- Billy Irwin (Australian rules footballer) (1884–1946), Australian footballer
- Bill Irwin (skier) (1920–2013), Canadian skier
- Bill Irwin (footballer) (born 1951), Northern Irish footballer
- Bill Irwin (wrestler) (born 1954), American professional wrestler
- Billy Irwin (boxer) (born 1968), Canadian boxer

== Others ==
- Will Irwin (1873–1948), American journalist
- William Andrew Irwin (1884–1967), Canadian theologian
- William Roy Irwin (1898–1969), Canadian-born World War I flying ace
- William Arthur Irwin (1898–1999), Canadian journalist and diplomat
- William C. K. Irwin (1907–1998), American pianist, conductor, and songwriter
- William G. Irwin (1843–1914), capitalist and sugar planter in the Kingdom of Hawai'i
- William Glanton Irwin (1866–1943), American banker and co-founder of the Cummins Engine Company
- Bill Irwin (priest) (1928–2004), Canadian priest
- Bill Irwin (born 1950), American actor and clown
- William Irwin (philosopher) (born 1970), American professor of philosophy

== See also ==
- Bill Erwin (1914–2010), American character actor
- Billie Irwin (1942–2025), New Zealand netball player
- William Irvin (disambiguation)
- William Irvine (disambiguation)
- William Irving (disambiguation)
- William Irwin Thompson (born 1938), social philosopher, cultural critic and poet
- Irwin (surname)
