= Domenik =

Domenik is a masculine given name. Notable people with the name include:

- Domenik Hixon (born 1984), American football player
- Domenik Osen (1891–1970), Austrian mime artist

== See also ==
- Domenic
- Dominic
