= William Irvin =

William Irvin may refer to:

- William W. Irvin (1779–1842), U.S. representative from Ohio
- Willie Irvin (born 1930), American football player
- SS William A. Irvin, a 1937 lake freighter which sailed as a bulk freighter on the Great Lakes
- William A. Irvin (1873–1927), president of U.S. Steel

== See also ==
- William Irvin Swoope (1862–1930), Republican representative from Pennsylvania
- William Irvin Troutman (1905–1971), Republican representative from Pennsylvania
- William Irvine (disambiguation)
- William Irwin (disambiguation)
- William Irving (disambiguation)
