= Charles Irwin =

Charles Irwin may refer to:

- Charles Irwin (VC) (c. 1824–1873), Irish recipient of the Victoria Cross
- Charles King Irwin (1874–1960), Irish bishop
- Charles King Irwin (father) (1837–1915), his father, Irish clergyman
- Charles J. Irwin (1930–2005), American politician, member of the New Jersey General Assembly
- Charlie Irwin (1869–1925), American baseball player
- Charles Irwin (fl. 1880s), founder of Irwin Industrial Tools, an American manufacturer and distributor of tools
