= Justice Irvin =

Justice Irvin may refer to:

- William W. Irvin (1779–1842), justice of the Supreme Court of Ohio
- David Irvin (1794–1872), justice of the Wisconsin Territorial Supreme Court

== See also ==
- Levin Thomas Handy Irving (1828–1892), justice of the Maryland Court of Appeals
- Justice Ervin (disambiguation)
