= Justice Erwin =

Justice Erwin may refer to:

- Robert Erwin (1934–2020), justice of the Supreme Court of Alaska
- Richard K. Erwin (1860–1917), justice of the Indiana Supreme Court

== See also ==
- Justice Ervin (disambiguation)
