= ERV =

Erv or ERV may refer to:

== People ==
- Erv Brame (1901–1949), American baseball player
- Erv Dusak (1920–1994), American baseball player
- Erv Kanemoto (born 1943), American Grand Prix motorcycle mechanic and team owner
- Erv Kantlehner (1892–1990), American baseball player
- Erv Lange (1887–1971), American baseball player
- Erv Mondt (born 1938), American football coach
- Erv Palica (1928–1982), American baseball player
- Erv Pitts (1920–1999), American sports coach
- Erv Prasse (1917–2005), American multi-sport athlete
- Erv Staggs (1948–2012), American basketball player
- Erv Wilson (1928–2016), Mexican and American music theorist

== Other uses ==
- Earth return vehicle, a spacecraft designed for flight from another celestial body to Earth
  - In the Mars Direct proposal
  - In a Mars sample-return mission
- Easy-to-Read Version, a translation of the Bible
- Emergency response vehicle
- Endogenous retrovirus
- Energy recovery ventilation
- English Revised Version, a translation of the Bible
- Expiratory reserve volume
- Kerrville Municipal Airport, IATA airport code ERV, in Texas, United States

== See also ==
- Ervin (given name)
