= Robert Irvine (disambiguation) =

Robert Irvine (born 1965) is a celebrity chef.

Robert Irvine may also refer to:

- Bobby Irvine (footballer, born 1900) (1900–1979), Irish football (soccer) forward
- Bobby Irvine (footballer, born 1942) (1942–2026), Irish football (soccer) goalkeeper
- Bulldog Irvine (1853–1897), Scottish rugby player
- Robert Irvine (rugby league) (1890–?), New Zealand rugby league footballer of the 1910s
- Robert Irvine (soccer) (born 1974), Canadian soccer player

== See also ==
- Bob Irvin, American politician
- Robert Irving (disambiguation)
- Robert Irwin (disambiguation)
