= Judge Ervin =

Judge Ervin may refer to:

- Robert Tait Ervin (1863–1949), judge of the United States District Court for the Southern District of Alabama
- Samuel James Ervin III (1926–1999), judge of the United States Court of Appeals for the Fourth Circuit

== See also ==
- Justice Ervin (disambiguation)
