= Thomas Irwin =

Thomas Irwin may refer to:

== Arts and entertainment ==
- Thomas Caulfield Irwin (1823–1892), Irish poet, writer and classical scholar
- Tom Irwin (actor) (born 1956), American film, television, and stage actor
- Tom Irwin or "Shotgun Tom" Kelly (born 1949), American radio and television personality

== Sports ==
- Tom Irwin (dual player) (1873–1956), Irish Gaelic footballer, hurler, referee and Gaelic games administrator
- Tommy Irwin (baseball) (1912–1996), baseball player
- Tommy Irwin (footballer) (1932–1979), Scottish footballer

== Others ==
- Thomas Irwin (American politician) (1785–1870), U.S. representative from Pennsylvania
- Thomas Irwin (Canadian politician) (1889–1962), Canadian member of the House of Commons in 1957–1958
- Thomas Irwin (trade unionist) (died 1941), British trade unionist and politician

== See also ==
- Tommy Irvin (1929–2017), U.S. official in Georgia
- Thomas Urwin (disambiguation)
