= Ervin Industries =

- Type: Private
- Industry: Metal abrasives manufacturing
- Founded: 1920; 106 years ago in Michigan
- Founder: John F. Ervin
- Headquarters: Ann Arbor, Michigan, United States
- Area served: Worldwide
- Key people: John Pearson (CEO)
- Products: Steel shot, grit, cast stainless abrasives, advanced metal powders
- Website: ervinindustries.com

Ervin Industries is an American manufacturer of metal abrasives, including steel shot, grit, and advanced metal powders. It is based in Ann Arbor, Michigan.

== History ==
Ervin Industries was founded in 1920 by engineer John F. Ervin, following his acquisition of a small foundry in Michigan. Using his engineering expertise, Ervin developed a process for producing cast steel shots as a reusable alternative to sand and grit for cleaning metal surfaces. He received a U.S. patent for this manufacturing process in 1939.

In 1946, Ervin developed SAE standard J444 for classifying cast shot and grit, which set uniform size specifications for abrasives. In 1947, it developed an in-house test machine called Ervin Test Machine to measure shot durability and performance.

In 1968, Ervin expanded its Adrian, Michigan plant to increase output of cast steel shot and grit.

In 1977, Ervin built a second U.S. plant in Butler, Pennsylvania. Concurrently, research on metal powders (fine alloy particles) for powder metallurgy and surface coating applications was initiated. This effort led to the establishment of an R&D division, Ervin Technologies, in 1989 at a facility in Tecumseh, Michigan, which was completed by 1992.

During the late 1980s, Ervin developed a cast stainless abrasive, later renamed as Amacast, for cleaning and shot peening applications that require corrosion resistance.

In the 1990s, Ervin expanded its operations to Europe. In 1992, Ervin acquired Barton Abrasives in Tipton, England and established its first overseas subsidiary, Ervin Amasteel UK.

In 2008, Ervin opened a stainless-steel manufacturing plant in Sprockhövel, Germany.

In 2014, Ervin opened a new steel abrasives plant in Glaubitz, Germany.

In 2016, a regional headquarters (Ervin Germany GmbH) was established in Berlin to manage European operations.

== Locations ==
Ervin Industries operates three manufacturing plants in the United States (Adrian, Butler, Tecumseh) and two in Europe (Glaubitz, Sprockhövel), along with headquarters in Ann Arbor and Berlin.
