= Irvine =

Irvine may refer to:

== Places ==
=== On Earth ===
==== Antarctica ====
- Irvine Glacier
- Mount Irvine (Antarctica)

==== Australia ====
- Irvine Island
- Mount Irvine, New South Wales

==== Canada ====
- Irvine, Alberta
- Irvine Inlet, Nunavut

==== Scotland ====
- Irvine, North Ayrshire, Scotland
  - Irvine Royal Academy
  - Irvine Meadow XI F.C.
  - Irvine RFC
  - Irvine Victoria F.C.
  - Irvine railway station
  - Irvine Bank Street railway station
- Irvine (Parliament of Scotland constituency), pre-1707
- Irvine Valley, Ayrshire, Scotland, an alternative name for Loudoun
- River Irvine, Scotland
- Irvine Bay, Scotland

==== United States ====
- Irvine, California
  - University of California, Irvine
  - Irvine Valley College
  - Irvine Unified School District
  - Irvine High School (Irvine, California)
  - Irvine (train station)
- Lake Irvine, California
- Irvine, Florida
- Irvine, Kentucky
- Irvine Park Historic District, Minnesota
- Irvine Township, Benson County, North Dakota
- Irvine Railroad, Pennsylvania

=== In space ===
- 6825 Irvine, main-belt asteroid

== People ==
- Irvine (name), including a list of people with the name
- Clan Irvine, Scottish clan

== Art, entertainment, and media ==
=== Fictional characters ===
- Irvine Kinneas, fictional character in the 1999 video game Final Fantasy VIII
- Irvine, fictional character from the anime Zoids: Chaotic Century
- Irvine (Grouch), Oscar's niece in the children's show Sesame Street
- Lemon Irvine, fictional character from the anime Mashle

=== Music ===
- "Irvine", 2007 song on the Kelly Clarkson album My December

== Enterprises and organizations ==
- Irvine Company, owner of a ranch comprising nearly a third of Orange County, California
- James Irvine Foundation, philanthropic nonprofit organization to benefit the people of California

== Titles ==
- Earl of Irvine, title in the Peerage of Scotland
- Viscount of Irvine, title in the Peerage of Scotland

== Other uses ==
- Irvine's white, alternative name from the French wine grape Ondenc
- Richard F. Irvine Riverboat, riverboat at Walt Disney World

== See also ==
- Earvin
- Ervin (disambiguation)
- Ervine
- Erving (disambiguation)
- Erwan
- Erwin (disambiguation)
- Irv (disambiguation)
- Irve (disambiguation)
- Irvin
- Irving (disambiguation)
- Irwin (disambiguation)
