= Bill Irwin (priest) =

- Born: 1928
- Died: August 29, 2004 (aged 75–76)

Monsignor William Irwin, OC (1928 – August 29, 2004) was a Canadian Roman Catholic priest who founded, in 1961, what has become the largest multi-function social service agency in Canada, the Catholic Social Services.

In 1988, he was made a Member of the Order of Canada and was promoted to Officer in 1998. In 1990, he was appointed an honorary prelate with the title of monsignor by Pope John Paul II.

In May 2008 plans were announced by the Edmonton Catholic School District for the construction of a French immersion elementary school in Monsignor Irwin's name. September 2010 marked the inaugural school year for the elementary school. The school was opened on October 7, 2010 with his nieces and nephews present.
