= Erwin =

Erwin may refer to:

== People ==
=== Given name ===
- Erwin Chargaff (1905–2002), Austrian biochemist
- Erwin Chemerinsky (born 1953), American legal scholar
- Erwin Dold (1919–2012), German concentration camp commandant in World War 2
- Erwin Hauer (1926–2017), Austrian-born American sculptor
- Egon Erwin Kisch (1885–1948), Czechoslovak writer and journalist
- Erwin Emata (born 1973), Filipino mountain climber
- Erwin James (born 1957), British writer and journalist
- Erwin Josi (born 1955), Swiss alpine skier
- Erwin Klein (died 1992), American table tennis player
- Erwin Koeman (born 1961), Dutch footballer and coach
- Erwin Kramer (1902–1979), East German politician
- Erwin Kreyszig (1922–2008), American academic
- Erwin Neutzsky-Wulff (born 1949), Danish author and philosopher
- Erwin Osen (1891–1970), Austrian painter and mime artist
- Erwin Panofsky (1892-1968), German-Jewish art historian
- Erwin Prickaertz (born 1968), Dutch politician
- Erwin Ramírez (born 1971), Ecuadorian football player
- Erwin Rommel (1891–1944), German field marshal of World War II
- Erwin Rösener (1902–1946), German Nazi SS officer executed for war crimes
- Erwin Rosenthal (1904–1991), German-born British Hebrew scholar and orientalist
- Erwin Sánchez (born 1969), Bolivian football (soccer) player and manager
- Erwin Schleich (1925–1992), German architect
- Erwin Schrödinger (1887–1961), Austrian physicist
- Erwin Schulhoff (1894–1942), Czech composer and pianist
- Erwin Strittmatter (1912–1994), German writer
- Erwin Teufel (born 1939), German politician
- Erwin Tulfo (born 1964), Filipino news anchor and radio commentator
- Erwin Vandenbergh (born 1959), Belgian football player

=== Surname ===
- Alan Erwin (1944–2019), chairman of the Public Utility Commission of Texas
- Alec Erwin (born 1948), South African politician
- Andrew Erwin (born 1978), American film director, screenwriter, producer, part of the Erwin Brothers with his brother Jon
- Angela Erwin (born 1980), German politician
- Austin W. Erwin (1887–1965), American lawyer and politician
- Bill Erwin (1914–2010), American actor
- Brandon Erwin (born 1975), American racecar driver
- Charles K. Erwin (1837–1905), American businessman and politician
- Curtis Erwin, American politician
- Douglas Erwin (born 1958), American paleobiologist
- Dudley Erwin (1917–1984), Australian politician
- E. B. Erwin, American politician
- George Z. Erwin (1840–1894), American politician
- Greg Erwin (born 1970), American crew chief
- Guy Erwin (born 1958), American Lutheran bishop
- Hank Erwin (born 1949), American State Senator in Alabama and Christian evangelical, father of film directors Andre and Jon Erwin known as the Erwin Brothers
- Henry E. Erwin (1921–2002), American airman
- Jacques Erwin (1908–1957), French actor
- James Erwin (politician) (1920–2005), American politician and attorney
- James Erwin (author) (born 1974), American author
- James Brailsford Erwin (1856–1924), American army general
- Jean Erwin (1890–1969), New Zealand civilian and military nurse
- Joe Erwin (born 1956), American entrepreneur and politician
- John Erwin (born 1936), American actor
- John Patton Erwin (1795–1857), American politician
- Jon Erwin (born 1982), American film director, screenwriter, producer, part of the Erwin Brothers with his brother Andrew
- Judy Erwin (born 1950), American politician, educator, and public relations executive
- Lee Erwin (writer) (1906–1972), American screenwriter
- Lee Erwin (footballer) (born 1994), Scottish soccer player
- Mark Wylea Erwin (born 1944), American ambassador
- May Erwin (1885–1973), American civic leader
- Michael Erwin (born 1965), Australian rules footballer
- Mick Erwin (1943–2026), Australian rules footballer and coach
- Mike Erwin (born 1978), American actor
- Pee Wee Erwin (1913–1981), American jazz trumpeter
- Ralph Erwin (1896–1943), Austrian-French composer
- Richard Erwin (1923–2006), American politician
- Robert Erwin (1934–2020), American jurist
- Robert G. Erwin (1854–1906), American lawyer and railroad president
- Sherri Browning Erwin (born 1968), American novelist
- Steve Erwin (born 1960), American comics artist
- Stuart Erwin (1903–1967), American actor
- Terry Erwin (1940–2020), American entomologist
- Terry Erwin (American football) (born 1946), American footballer
- Tex Erwin (1885–1953), American baseball player
- William Erwin (American football) (1884–1953), American footballer
- William Portwood Erwin (1895–1927), American flying ace

== Fictional characters ==
- Erwin Smith (Attack on Titan), a character from the manga and anime series Attack on Titan
- Erwin Sikowitz, a character from the Nickelodeon TV show Victorious
- Erwin, a character from the manga and anime series Girls und Panzer

== Places ==
- Erwin, Indiana
- Erwin, New York
- Erwin, North Carolina
- Erwin, South Dakota
- Erwin, Tennessee
- Erwin Township, Michigan
- Erwin Lake, a lake in Minnesota

== Other ==
- Erwin (storm)
- Erwin, a character in the comic User Friendly
- Erwin Cotton Mills Company Mill No. 1 Headquarters Building in Durham, North Carolina
- Erwin National Fish Hatchery in Erwin, Tennessee

== See also ==
- Erwin Data Modeler, CASE tool from Erwin Inc.
- Earvin
- Ervin (disambiguation)
- Ervine
- Erving (disambiguation)
- Erwan
- Irvin
- Irvine (disambiguation)
- Irving (disambiguation)
- Irwin (disambiguation)
