= SAE J444 =

- Cast Shot and Grit Size Specifications for Peening and Cleaning
- Abbreviation: SAE J444
- Status: Published
- First published: 1984
- Latest version: 2023
- Organization: SAE International
- Committee: Surface Enhancement Committee
- Domain: Abrasive-media classification

SAE J444 is a standard issued by SAE International that establishes a uniform system for designating the particle-size distribution of cast steel shot and grit used in abrasive blasting and shot peening.

== Specifications ==
J444 assigns shot sizes the prefix S followed by a number equal to the nominal sieve opening in ten-thousandths of an inch (for example, S230 equals 0.600 mm). Grit sizes take prefix G with the whole-number sieve designation from ASTM E11. For each size the standard specifies an all-pass sieve, an upper percentage that may be retained on an intermediate sieve and a lower cumulative percentage that must pass finer sieves.

The exact implementation of the fine sieving described in the standard is kept confidential by shot and grit manufacturers. David Kirk reported in a 2009 Shot Peener study that the bandwidth for S-170 permits a 22-to-1 spread in individual particle mass, materially affecting residual stress. Working mixtures of shot drift outside the J444 bandwidth after prolonged use. This means that shot-peening machines must be regularly topped up with new shots and the operational mixture should be periodically sieve tested to maintain conformity.
