= Erv Pitts =

Biographical details
- Born: September 14, 1920; Neodesha, Kansas, U.S.
- Died: January 17, 1999 (aged 78)

Playing career

Football
- 1941–1942: Missouri
- Position: Quarterback

Coaching career (HC unless noted)

Football
- 1948–1949: Aberdeen HS (WA)
- 1950: Caruthersville HS (MO)
- 1953: Peru State (line)
- 1954–1955: Dakota Wesleyan
- 1956–1960: South Dakota (assistant)
- 1964–1968: Peru State

Basketball
- 1954–1956: Dakota Wesleyan
- 1973: Peru State

Baseball
- 1958: South Dakota

Administrative career (AD unless noted)
- 1964–?: Peru State

Head coaching record
- Overall: 20–38–4 (college football); 22–22 (college basketball)

Accomplishments and honors

Championships
- Football; 1 NCC (1964)

Ervin Ralph Pitts (September 14, 1920 – January 17, 1999) was an American football, basketball, and baseball coach and college athletics administrator. He served as a head coach at Dakota Wesleyan University in Mitchell, South Dakota in football (1954 to 1955) and basketball (1954 to 1956). Pitts then served in a similar capacity at Peru State College in Peru, Nebraska, first as a head football coach (1964 to 1968) and then as head men's basketball coach (1973).

A native of Coffeyville, Kansas, Pitts played college football at the University of Missouri. As a quarterback for the Missouri Tigers, he led a split-T offense for head coach Don Faurot.

== Head coaching record ==
=== College football ===
| Year | Team | Overall | Conference | Standing | Bowl/playoffs |
|---|---|---|---|---|---|
Dakota Wesleyan Tigers (South Dakota Intercollegiate Conference) (1954–1955)
| 1954 | Dakota Wesleyan | 5–3 | 5–3 | 4th | |
| 1955 | Dakota Wesleyan | 4–3–2 | 3–2–2 | 4th | |
| Dakota Wesleyan: | | 9–6–2 | 8–5–2 | | |
Peru State Bobcats (Nebraska College Conference) (1964–1968)
| 1964 | Peru State | 2–7 | 1–3 | 4th | |
| 1965 | Peru State | 4–5 | 3–1 | T–1st | |
| 1966 | Peru State | 2–7 | 1–3 | 4th | |
| 1967 | Peru State | 1–7–1 | 1–3 | 4th | |
| 1968 | Peru State | 2–6 | 0–4 | 5th | |
| Peru State: | | 11–32–2 | 6–14 | | |
| Total: | | 20–38–4 | | | |
National championship Conference title Conference division title or championship game berth
