= Kate Ervine =

Canadian academic

Kate Ervine is a Canadian political scientist and professor at Saint Mary's University in Halifax, Nova Scotia.

== Education and career ==
Ervine received her PhD in political science from York University in Toronto. She is an Associate Professor of Political Science and Global Development Studies at Saint Mary's University in Halifax, Nova Scotia, with her research focusing on issues involving environmental governance and climate change policy.

Her book Carbon, published in 2018 by Polity Press, is a study of the environmental, economic, and social ramifications of the fossil fuels industry. She co-created a documentary in 2023 called The Carbon Cage covering similar themes.

== Books ==
- Ervine, Kate (2018). Carbon. Cambridge, UK: Polity Press. ISBN 978-1-5095-0111-3.
