= William Irvine (1776–1811) =

Scottish physician (1776–1811)

- Born: 1776; Glasgow
- Died: 23 May 1811 (aged 34–35); Malta
- Occupation: Physician

William Irvine (1776 – 23 May 1811) was a Scottish physician.

== Biography ==
Irvine was the son of William Irvine, professor of chemistry at Glasgow. He was born there in 1776. He studied medicine in the university of Edinburgh, where he took the degree of M.D. 25 June 1798. His thesis, ‘De Epispasticis,’ was based upon an unpublished essay of his father's on nervous diseases (Preface to Chemical Essays, 1805). He became a licentiate of the College of Physicians of London 25 June 1806, and his professional life was spent in the medical service of the army as physician to the forces. In 1805 he published his father's ‘Essays, chiefly on Chemical Subjects.’ In 1808 he was stationed in Sicily, and in 1810 his most important work appeared, ‘Some Observations upon Diseases, chiefly as they occur in Sicily.’ This book is based upon observations on malarial fever and dysentery made in the general army hospital at Messina, and contains several acute remarks, such as that abscess of the liver is associated with dysentery, that it may burst through the diaphragm into the lung, and the patient nevertheless recover. Shingles was then confused with erysipelas, but he notes accurately a difference in the results of treatment which is due to the definite duration of the former disease. He had carefully compared his own observations with those of George Cleghorn and of James Currie on similar fevers, and had studied minutely the observations of Hippocrates on diseases of the Mediterranean region. He died of fever at Malta, 23 May 1811. After his death were published in 1813 his ‘Letters on Sicily.’
