= I. Henry Phillips =

American photojournalist (1920–1993)

- Born: Irving Henry Webster Phillips Sr. January 16, 1920; Baltimore, Maryland, US
- Died: November 22, 1993 (aged 73); Baltimore, Maryland
- Other name: I. Henry Phillips
- Occupation: Photojournalist
- Employer: The Baltimore Afro-American

Irving Henry Webster Phillips Sr. (January 16, 1920 – November 22, 1993), was an African American photojournalist from Baltimore, Maryland.

== Life and career ==
In the summer of 1946, after serving in the European and African theatres of World War II, he became chief photographer at the Baltimore Afro-American, one of the nation's leading Black newspaper. He held this job, overseeing seven other photojournalists, till his retirement in 1972. Phillips Sr. covered local and national news events such as the 1963 March on Washington, five presidential elections, and Martin Luther King Jr.'s funeral, as well as taking photos of celebrities such as Billie Holiday and Duke Ellington and documenting ordinary Black lives in Baltimore. After retiring from the newspaper, Phillips took photographs for the NAACP. He died at Baltimore's Union Memorial Hospital on November 22, 1993, at the age of 73.

== Legacy ==
Phillips' son and grandson followed in his footsteps, with his son working as a staff photographer for The Baltimore Sun in the 1970s and 1980s. In 1999, Maryland Public Television broadcast Images of Maryland, 1900–2000, a documentary film that featured a 10-minute segment on Phillips Sr. In 2018, Baltimore City Hall hosted an exhibit of photos from the Phillips family archive, spanning the work of all three generations. From December 2025 to February 2026, Phillips' photos of Baltimore’s Black workers and business owners were featured in an exhibit at the Baltimore Museum of Industry, co-curated by his grandson, Webster Phillips.
