= William Irving =

William Irving may refer to:

- William Irving (British politician) (1892–1967), British Labour Co-operative MP 1945–1955
- William Irving (steamship captain) (1816–1872), steamship captain from Scotland, active in Oregon, Washington and British Columbia
- William Irving (American politician) (1766–1821), United States Representative from New York
- William Irving (actor) (1893–1943), American actor
- William Irving (architect) (1830–1883), a Canadian architect known for his late 19th century buildings in Toronto

== See also ==
- William Irvine (disambiguation)
- William Irwin (disambiguation)
- William Irvin (disambiguation)
- William Irving Shuman, American businessman and politician
