= Irvin Randle =

American teacher and fashion model (born 1961)

- Born: November 14, 1961 (age 64); Houston, Texas, U.S.
- Modeling information
- Height: 5 ft 11 in (180 cm)
- Hair color: Black
- Eye color: Brown
- Website: http://irvinrandleshoes.com

Irvin Randle (born November 14, 1961) is an American teacher and fashion model. On the internet he's known for his stylish pictures, which earned him the title #MrStealYourGrandma. Irvin became famous when photos from his personal Instagram account, went viral. Irvin has since been featured in major pop culture magazines and media such as People, Cosmopolitan, Essence, TMZ and more. On July 8, 2016, Irvin appeared on The Wendy Williams Show segment called "Yaaas & Mess of the Week: #MrStealYourGrandma".

== Early life ==
Irvin was born in Houston, Texas and attended Sterling High School. Irvin earned his bachelor's degree at Texas Southern University and his master's degree from Prairie View A&M University.
