= Justice Ervin =

Justice Ervin may refer to:

- Richard Ervin (1905–2004), chief justice of the Supreme Court of Florida
- Sam Ervin (1896–1985), associate justice of the North Carolina Supreme Court
- Sam J. Ervin IV (born 1955), associate justice of the North Carolina Supreme Court

== See also ==
- Judge Ervin (disambiguation)
- Justice Erwin (disambiguation)
- Justice Irvin (disambiguation)
