= John Irving (disambiguation) =

John Irving (born 1942) is an American novelist and Academy Award-winning screenwriter.

John Irving may also refer to:

- John E. Irving (1932–2010), Canadian businessman
- John Irving (basketball) (1953–2015), American college basketball player in the 1970s
- John Irving (footballer, born 1867) (1867–1942), Lincoln City footballer in the 1890s
- John Irving (footballer, born 1988), English footballer in the 21st century
- John Irving (MP) (1766–1845), MP for Antrim and Bramber
- John Irving (Royal Navy officer), Scottish Royal Navy officer and member of the Franklin Expedition
- John Irving (sailor) (1839–1???), American Civil War sailor and Medal of Honor recipient
- John Irving (steamship captain) (1854–1936), Canadian steamship captain and politician in British Columbia
- John J. Irving (c. 1863–1934), mayor of Binghamton, New York
