= Charles King Irwin (father) =

Irish clergyman

Charles King Irwin, D.D. (18 July 1837–3 January 1915) was an eminent Irish clergyman

== Biography ==
Irwin was educated at Trinity College, Oxford and ordained in 1861 After a curacy at Derrynoose he held incumbencies at Kilmore, Brantry, KeadyClonfeacle and Armagh. He was appointed Keeper of Public Library in 1913. He became Archdeacon of Armagh in 1894.

His father, also Charles King Irwin, was Precentor of St Patrick's Cathedral, Armagh; and his son, a third Charles King Irwin, was a bishop in three dioceses.
