= Marvin Irvin =

American serial killer

- MODOC mugshot
- Born: Marvin Lee Irvin; May 4, 1949 (age 77); St. Joseph, Missouri, U.S.
- Status: Incarcerated
- Convictions: First degree murder (2 counts); Second degree murder
- Penalty: Life imprisonment without parole

Details
- Victims: 3
- Span of crimes: 1979–1990
- Country: United States
- State: Missouri
- Imprisoned at: Jefferson City Correctional Center

Marvin Lee Irvin (born May 4, 1949) is an American serial killer and former police officer who murdered two women in St. Joseph, Missouri, in September and October 1990, and after his arrest confessed to an additional 1979 murder, which up to that point he had been the prime suspect in for years. For all three crimes, he pleaded guilty and was sentenced to life imprisonment without parole.

== Early life ==
Marvin Lee Irvin was born on May 4, 1949, in St. Joseph. His family rented a three-story home, and they were friendly to neighbors, who recalled Irvin as a quiet but polite boy. Irvin graduated from Highland High School, Highland, KS, and in 1970 joined the St. Joseph Police Department as an officer, but resigned within months. In April 1974 Irvin was accused of raping a 15-year-old girl in Kansas, whom he had allegedly abducted outside a drug store in St. Joseph. He was arrested, but the charge was dropped after the girl refused to testify. Irvin met up with another young girl named Ruth West in 1974, and the two sparked a relationship, and at age 15, West delivered Irvin's baby. West would later describe their relationship as abusive, claiming Irvin was emotionally manipulative.

== Crimes ==
=== Disappearance of Micki Jo West ===
In 1979, Ruth, her brother Calvin West, and Calvin's wife, 19-year-old Micki Jo West, left for California, with Irvin following not far behind. In March, Ruth and Irvin officially married in Ventura, but by the time they returned to Missouri, their relationship had downgraded, with Ruth claiming Irvin beat her. In August, she and her 4-year-old son fled and took refuge in a motel in Elwood, Kansas, only sharing this information with her mother, her sister, the couple who helped her relocate, and Micki Jo West.

On September 11, Micki Jo West was scheduled to show up to her job at a hospital, but she never arrived. Later that same day, Irvin and two friends broke into Ruth's motel room, dragged her and their son into a car, and drove them back to St. Joseph. When Micki was reported missing, Irvin became a suspect, and he was required to take multiple polygraph tests, but the tests were inconclusive. Ruth West filed for divorce from Irvin in October after another domestic dispute, which resulted in Irvin chasing West barefoot across St. Joseph.

On September 11, 1986, exactly seven years since Micki's disappearance, an anonymous letter was found inside a Kansas City shopping mall. The letter, which was addressed to the St. Joseph police, contained details about the writer being with Marvin Irvin at the time of Micki's disappearance, claiming he killed her. However, the writer left no details about who he/she was, and police were not able to follow up on an exact lead. In 1988, a television reporter named Therman Mitchell received a letter addressed to him. The letter contained details about where Micki's body was, and the writer inviting Mitchell to show him where Micki's body was. Instead of meeting up with the anonymous sender, Mitchell aired a news story on the letter, pleading for the sender to come forward. That same year, Irvin and another woman moved to Ames, Iowa, where Irvin got a job as a railroad worker. There, on March 30, Janet Huegerich filed a police report because Irvin had shot over her head multiple times. The resulting police confrontation ended with a police chase across multiple counties, with over 20 police officers in pursuit. After his eventual arrest, Irvin pleaded guilty to avoiding arrest and two weapons charges and was sentenced to five years probation.

=== Disappearances of Patricia Rose and Crystal Simmons ===
Irvin returned to St. Joseph not long after. There, on September 1, 1990, meat cutter 31-year-old Patricia Diane Rose visited a local bar named Brew's Blue Town to take a break from work and was due to return, but she never did. She was reported missing by her mother on September 17 after she failed to answer days of phone calls. A month later, on October 29, 33-year-old Crystal Lynn Simmons also disappeared, last seen at downtown bar. During the investigation, investigators received a tip, saying that Simmons was last seen with a man named Marvin Lee Irvin, and to inspect his truck as evidence.

They followed up on it and received a warrant to search his vehicle. They temporarily removed the seats and discovered a partially wet towel soaked in blood. Further tests on the blood proved it belonged to Simmons, and Irvin was arrested. In November, skeletal remains of two women were found in a cornfield in Kansas, both were later positively identified as belonging to both women. An autopsy on both declared their cause of death as multiple blows to the head.

== Confessions ==
While in jail awaiting charges, Irvin denied killing anybody. His brother openly believed this, accusing officials of setting-up Marvin, saying, "They want a guy for a lot of cases, I feel like the whole thing is kind of a set up." Detectives learned that Irvin was a suspect in the disappearance of Micki Jo West, and they used that to build up their case further. Over time, Irvin changed his mind and pleaded guilty to all three murders, offering details to where he buried West's body. During his sentencing, he said that in 1979, he took West to a cornfield in Kansas, where he proceeded to kill her and bury her body.

In October 1991, Irvin pleaded guilty to two counts of first-degree murder and one count of second-degree murder and was sentenced to life imprisonment with no chance of parole. Irvin led investigators to a farm in Kansas where he said he disposed of West. Authorities prepared search dogs and a bulldozer to scour the area, but due to heavy rainfall, the search was delayed. Another search attempt was made on October 11, but the search team was unable to find her body. As of 2022, West's body has yet to be found.

== Media ==
Before Irvin's arrest, the case surrounding his first victim Micki Jo West was featured on season 1 episode 13 of the documentary television show Unsolved Mysteries. An updated episode after Irvin's arrest and conviction was featured in Season 4 episode 21.

== See also ==
- List of serial killers in the United States
