= Francis Irv =

Art gallery in New York City (2022–2026

Francis Irv was a contemporary art gallery located in Chinatown and Tribeca of Manhattan in New York City, founded in 2022 by Shane Rossi and Sam Marion Wilken. It closed in January 2026.

Artists exhibited by the gallery include Win Mcarthy, Oliver Osborne, Rachel Fath, Benjamin Echeverria, Rose Salane, and Matthias Groebel. The gallery's name is a combination of the founder's middle names.

== History ==
In 2024 the galley moved to from their former location in Chinatown to Tribeca, at 106 Walker Street. In 2025, Francis Irv was recognized by Frieze Magazine as a "NYC Gallery to Watch," alongside KAJE and Soft Network. In late 2025, the gallery hosted a play directed by and starring artist Georgica Pettus, which critic Andrew Russeth described as "wry and experimental."

The gallery closed in 2026, following a wave of gallery closures in the mid-2020s amid market uncertainty. The gallery updated their social media and website with the following message:

"It’s tempting to write some kind of eulogy or translation stone for everything the gallery did or was. So much of that will be swept up and indecipherable in a few years, and that’s the only part of closing up shop that seems properly daunting. Oh well. We made it to the chorus. Had the best time. Two kids hoisted in a trench coat, it was all well aligned and justified, surprisingly dainty. Ultimately Harvey Dent made the wrong choice, and we think it’s best to abide by the lesson of his failures. Thanks for the ride."

== Notable exhibitions ==
- Win McCarthy (2024)
- Oliver Osborne (2025)
- Rachel Fath (2025)
