= Fanny M. Irvin =

Fanny Marie Irvin (January 15, 1854 - September 26, 1929) was librarian of the Idaho State Law Library, and assisted in drafting several important legislative acts. She drafted a resolution to Congress from the state of Idaho endorsing women's suffrage, and campaigned for the passage of the Nineteenth Amendment to the United States Constitution, granting the right to vote to women.

== Early life ==
Irvin was born on January 15, 1854, in Buffalo, New York, the daughter of Colonel Charles Henry Irvin (1832-1906) and Isabella Anne Harraden (1835-1909) and granddaughter of Rev. Thomas Irvin, for more than 50 years a vicar of Ormesby, Yorkshire, England. She studied law for two years in the Washington College of Law, but was forced to abandon her studies a year before completion when the illness of her father in Boise, Idaho led her to move there.

== Career ==
She was very active and influential in constructive state politics. She was assistant and State Law Librarian from 1911 until her death. In this role, she assisted in drafting several important laws, such as the Parole Law, Idaho Humane Law for the protection of children and animals, the law which placed State Institutions, Schools and Children's Home under the State Auditing Department; she drafted a resolution to Congress which was passed by the State Legislature, endorsing women's suffrage, and lobbied for the passage of the Constitutional amendment. She was president of the Boise Humane Society and of the League of Women Voters Council, and in addition was a member of the Boise Tuesday Musical Club and the Saturday Fortnightly Club. She founded the Good Will camp for children, and was active with the relief work of the Red Cross during World War I.

== Personal life ==
Fanny M. Irvin lived in New York City, New Mexico, Chicago, Washington, D. C, and then moved to Idaho in 1906, living at 1017 East Jefferson St., Boise. She died on September 26, 1929, and is buried at Pioneer Cemetery, Boise.
