= William Irvine (chemist) =

British doctor and chemist (1743–1787)

- Born: 1743; Glasgow, Scotland
- Died: 9 July 1787 (aged 43–44); Glasgow, Scotland
- Occupations: Physician, chemist

William Irvine FRSE (1743-1787) was an 18th-century British medical doctor and chemist who served as assistant to Joseph Black in many of his important experiments. He twice served as President of the Royal College of Physicians and Surgeons of Glasgow: 1775 to 1777 and 1783 to 1785.

== Life ==
Irvine was born in Glasgow in 1743, the son of Michael Irvine, a merchant. He studied at the High School in Glasgow.

He entered Glasgow University in 1756 and studied medicine and chemistry under Joseph Black. Black later chose Irvine to assist him in his experiments on latent heat. Irvine graduated MD around 1763 and then did further postgraduate studies in London and Paris. In 1766, he returned to Glasgow University to begin lecturing on Materia Medica. In 1770, he succeeded John Robison as professor of chemistry (Robison having replaced Black in 1766).

In 1783, Irvine was a co-founder of the Royal Society of Edinburgh.

The focus of his work was industrial chemistry, with a special interest in glass production. He caught a severe fever whilst visiting a Glasgow glassworks that he owned, and died as a result, on 9 July 1787.

== Family ==
Irvine was married to Grace Hamilton, by whom he had one son, also William Irvine (1776–1811). His son followed in his footsteps and was also an industrial chemist and a physician. In the Napoleonic Wars, Irvine served as an army physician in both Malta and Sicily. In 1806, he was elected a Fellow of the Royal Society of Edinburgh. His proposers were James Russell, James Hamilton, and John Playfair.
