= James Irwin (disambiguation) =

James Irwin (1930–1991) was an Apollo 15 astronaut who walked on the Moon.

James or Jim Irwin may also refer to:

- James Murray Irwin (1858–1938), British Army doctor
- James Alexander Hamilton Irwin, Irish Presbyterian minister
- James Campbell Irwin (1906–1990), Australian soldier and architect, Lord Mayor of Adelaide
- James C. Irwin (1929–2018), United States Coast Guard admiral
- Jamie Irwin (James Campbell Irwin, 1937–2005), South Australian politician
- Jim Irwin (sportscaster) (1934–2012), American sportscaster in Wisconsin
- James Irwin, American singer in The Voice (U.S. season 5) in 2013

== See also ==
- James Irwin Brownson (1816–1899), American Presbyterian clergyman and academic in Pennsylvania
- James Irwin Hartt (1866–1935), Irish-born Canadian lumberman and political figure in Ontario
