= Irvin Latić =

Luxembourgish footballer

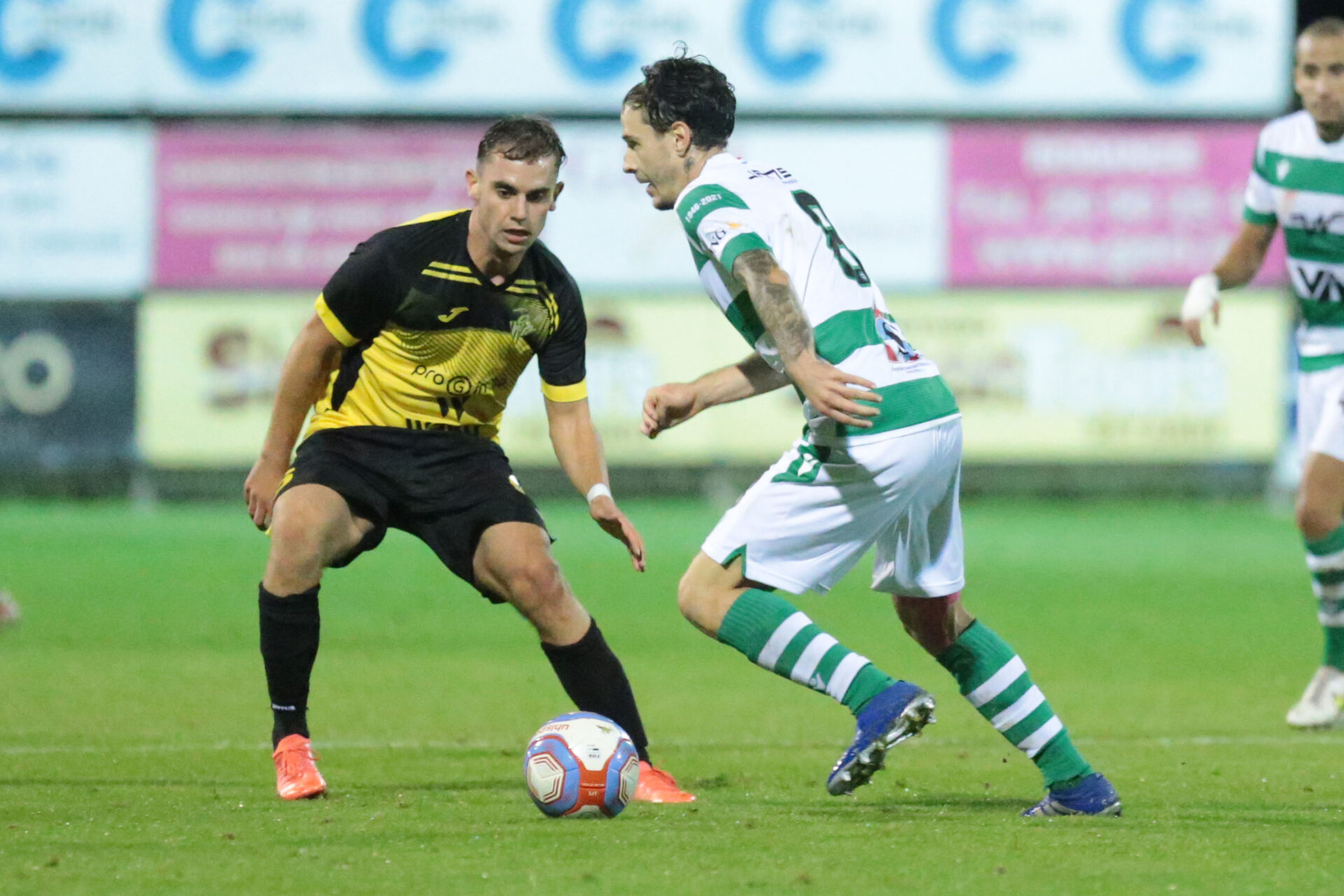
- Latić playing for Progrès Niederkorn in 2021

Personal information
- Date of birth: 24 May 2002 (age 24)
- Place of birth: Niederkorn, Luxembourg
- Height: 1.82 m (6 ft 0 in)
- Position: Defensive midfielder

Team information
- Current team: UN Käerjéng 97
- Number: 24

Youth career
- 2018–2019: UN Käerjéng [Youth]

Senior career*
Years	Team	Apps	(Gls)
2020–2022	Progrès Niederkorn	27	(1)
2022–2024	Jeunesse Esch	41	(1)
2024–	UN Käerjéng 97	16	(1)

International career
- Luxembourg U17
- Luxembourg U19
2021–2024	Luxembourg U21	14	(0)
- * Club domestic league appearances and goals as of 6 June 2026

Irvin Latić (born 24 May 2002) is a Luxembourgish footballer who plays club football for UN Käerjéng, as a defensive midfielder.

== Career ==
Born in Niederkorn, Luxembourg, Irvin started out playing club football for the UN Käerjéng youth club from 2018 to 2019. In 2020, he joined FC Progrès Niederkorn. After enjoying a successful period at Käerjéng, Irvin experienced several challenges, such as a failed transfer to Denmark, the effects of COVID-19, interrupted winter training, and a strong team that made it hard for him to find playing time. As a result, it took him a few weeks to get into Stéphane Leoni's lineup. After getting into the lineup, Irvin ended up being one of Niederkorn's top performers.

In 2022, Irvin joined Jeunesse Esch. Since 2024, he has made his return to Käerjéng 97.

== International career ==
Irvin has played for the Luxembourg national under-17 football team, the Luxembourg national under-19 football team, and currently plays for the Luxembourg national under-21 football team as a midfielder.

== Personal life ==
Born in Luxembourg, Latić is of Bosnian descent.
