= Joona Erving =

Finnish professional ice hockey player

- Born: 2 September 1994 (age 31) Haukipudas, Finland
- Height: 181 cm (5 ft 11 in)
- Weight: 88 kg (194 lb; 13 st 12 lb)
- Position: Defence
- Shoots: Left
- ICEHL team Former teams: HK Olimpija; Asplöven HC; JYP Jyväskylä; HK Poprad
- Playing career: 2013–present

Joona Erving (born 2 September 1994) is a Finnish professional ice hockey player, who currently playing for HK Olimpija of the ICE Hockey League.

== Career statistics ==
			Regular season					Playoffs
Season	Team	League	GP	G	A	Pts	PIM	GP	G	A	Pts	PIM
2014–15	JYP-Akatemia	Mestis	43	0	8	8	22	6	2	0	2	2
2015–16	JYP-Akatemia	Mestis	41	1	6	7	24	—	—	—	—	—
2015–16	JYP	Liiga	6	1	0	1	2	—	—	—	—	—
2016–17	JYP-Akatemia	Mestis	29	1	4	5	16	—	—	—	—	—
2017–18	JYP	Liiga	1	0	0	0	2	—	—	—	—	—
2017–18	KeuPa HT	Mestis	46	5	17	22	20	15	0	1	1	6
2018–19	HK Poprad	Slovak	50	3	7	10	18	12	1	1	2	2
2019–20	HK Poprad	Slovak	46	2	16	18	20	—	—	—	—	—
2020–21	HK Poprad	Slovak	22	2	3	5	4	—	—	—	—	—
2020–21	IPK	Mestis	5	0	0	0	0	6	0	0	0	4
2021–22	HK Olimpija	ICEHL	33	3	7	10	24	7	0	0	0	0
2021–22	HK Olimpija	Slovenia	1	0	0	0	2	5	1	2	3	0
Liiga totals			7	1	0	1	1	—	—	—	—	—
Slovak totals			118	7	26	33	42	12	1	1	2	2
