= Michael Irwin (disambiguation) =

Michael Irwin (born 1931) is a British physician and activist.

Michael Irwin may also refer to:

- Michael Patrick Stuart Irwin (1925–2017), British-born Rhodesian ornithologist
- Michael Irwin (author) (born 1934), British author and academic
- Mike Irwin, British astronomer

== See also ==
- Michael Irvin (born 1966), American football player
