= Irvin Morris =

Navajo Nation author

Irvin Morris (born 1958) is a Navajo author from the Tobaahi clan. He has taught at Cornell University, the State University of New York, the University of Arizona, and Diné College. He received his MFA at Cornell University. His work, From the Glittering World: A Navajo Story (1997) is a blend of Navajo creation narrative, history, fictionalized memoir, and Navajo stories. The title is taken from the Navajo creation story about the last of five existing worlds, our own, which is called the glittering world.

== Works ==
- The Blood Stone. From Neon Powwow, edited by Anna Lee Walters, Northland Press, 1993.
- Squatters. From Neon Powwow, edited by Anna Lee Walters, Northland Press, 1993.
- Morris, Irvin. From the Glittering World : a Navajo story. Norman : University of Oklahoma Press, 1997. ISBN 080612895X
