= Erwan Vallerie =

Breton nationalist (1944–2022)

Erwan Vallerie (1944 – 10 February 2022) was a French Breton nationalist and cultural activist.

== Life and career ==
Born in France, Vallerie worked as an economist when he founded the monthly periodical Sav Breizh with Yann Choucq (Debout Bretagne, Stand Brittany) in 1969. In 1971 it became a bi-monthly study review. It continued in this direction until it dissolved in 1975. Vallerie then concentrated on historic and linguistic research.

He died from a fall on 10 February 2022, at the age of 77.

He is a graduate of HEC Paris.

== Works ==
- Théorie de la Nation, published in 1971 at the time of the transformation of Sav Breizhen to a study review.
- Communes bretonnes et paroisses d’Armorique, Beltan, Brasparts, 1986, ISBN 2-905939-04-4
- Diazezoù studi istorel an anvioù-parrez = Traité de toponymie historique de la Bretagne, An Here, Le Relecq-Kerhuon, 1995, 3 vol., ISBN 2-86843-153-4 (Breton text and French translation)
- thèse de doctorat sous le titre Traité de toponymie historique de la Bretagne (Breton text and French translation)
- L’art et la manière de prononcer ces sacrés noms de lieu de Bretagne, Le Chasse-Marée / ArMen, Douarnenez, 1996, ISBN 2-903708-63-0
- Théorie de la Nation reeditied with three other essays, ("Theory of the nation", "Place of the language in the fight for national liberation", "Europe versus Brittany", and "Our barbaric locals"), reedited between 1971 and 1976, under the title "Our barbaric locals", by An Here in 1997.
- Ils sont fous ces Bretons !!, trousse de survie pour découvreur des Armoriques, Spézet, Coop Breizh editions, 2003. (with the illustrator Nono)
