= Thomas Urwin =

Thomas Urwin may refer to:

- Thomas Urwin (politician) (1912–1985), British Labour politician
- Thomas Urwin (footballer) (1896–1968), England international footballer

== See also ==
- Thomas Irwin (disambiguation)
