= Erwin Lake =

Lake in the state of Minnesota, United States

- Location within Minnesota
- Location: Douglas County, Minnesota
- Coordinates: 45°58′14″N 95°42′36″W
- Type: lake

Erwin Lake is a lake in Douglas County, in the U.S. state of Minnesota.

Erwin Lake was named for George Erwin, a pioneer farmer who settled there.

== See also ==
- List of lakes in Minnesota
