= Irvin Barraclough =

English rugby league footballer

- Irvin Barraclough prior to Castleford's 10–14 defeat by Wakefield Trinity at Belle Vue, Wakefield on Saturday 3 February 1951

Personal information
- Full name: Irvin Barraclough
- Born: 25 April 1927 Ackworth, Wakefield, England
- Died: 2007 (aged 80) Leeds, England

Playing information
- Position: Fullback
Club
Years	Team	Pld	T	G	FG	P
1943/44–47/48	Featherstone Rovers	57	1	80	0	163
1947/48–50/51	Oldham	78	1	153	0	309
1950/51–53/54	Castleford	20	0	16	2	36
1953–56	Doncaster	79	2	166	0	338
	Total	234	4	415	2	846

Irvin Barraclough (born 25 April 1927 – 2007) was an English professional rugby league footballer who played in the 1940s and 1950s. He played at club level for Featherstone Rovers, Oldham, Castleford and Doncaster, as a goal-kicking fullback.

== Background ==
Irvin Barraclough was born in Ackworth, Wakefield, West Riding of Yorkshire, England, his birth was registered in Hemsworth district, West Riding of Yorkshire, after his rugby league playing career, he worked as the Deputy Head Groundsman, and then Head Groundsman at the University of Leeds Athletics Grounds at Weetwood, Leeds until he retired, he died aged 80 in Leeds, West Yorkshire, England.

== Playing career ==
Irvin Barraclough made his début for Featherstone Rovers (aged 16-years 9-months and 11-days) on Saturday 5 February 1944, he played his last match for Featherstone Rovers during the 1947–48 season, he was transferred from Featherstone Rovers to Oldham, he was transferred from Oldham to Castleford, he made his début for Castleford during the 1950–51 season, during his time at Castleford he scored two 2-point drop goals, he played his last match for Castleford during the 1953–54 Northern Rugby Football League season, and he was transferred from Castleford to Doncaster.

== Note ==
Irvin Barraclough should not be confused with Irving Barraclough who played for Ackworth ARLFC, and 3-matches at fullback for Wakefield Trinity during September 1940 to November 1940 (when Irvin Barraclough was aged 13), before being transferred to Featherstone Rovers, where he does not appear to have played in the first team.
