= Irwin Welber =

American physicist

Irwin Welber (March 3, 1924 – December 17, 2016) was an American electrical engineer who served as the ninth president of Sandia Corporation (a subsidiary of Bell Labs which managed the Sandia Laboratory).

== Early life and career ==
Welber was born on March 3, 1924, in Amsterdam, New York, and received a BS in electrical engineering from Union College in 1948. He received an MS in electrical engineering from Rensselaer Polytechnic Institute in 1950. In 1950, he started his career at Bell Labs. From February 1986 to March 1989, he served as president of Sandia Corporation (which managed the Sandia Laboratory). He was elected to the National Academy of Engineering in 1988.
