= Irwin Lampert =

Canadian judge

Irwin E. Lampert is a former judge of the Provincial Court of New Brunswick, based in Moncton.

He is also a former president of the Canadian Association of Provincial Court Judges.
