= Irvin Venyš =

Czech clarinetist and saxophonist (born 1981)

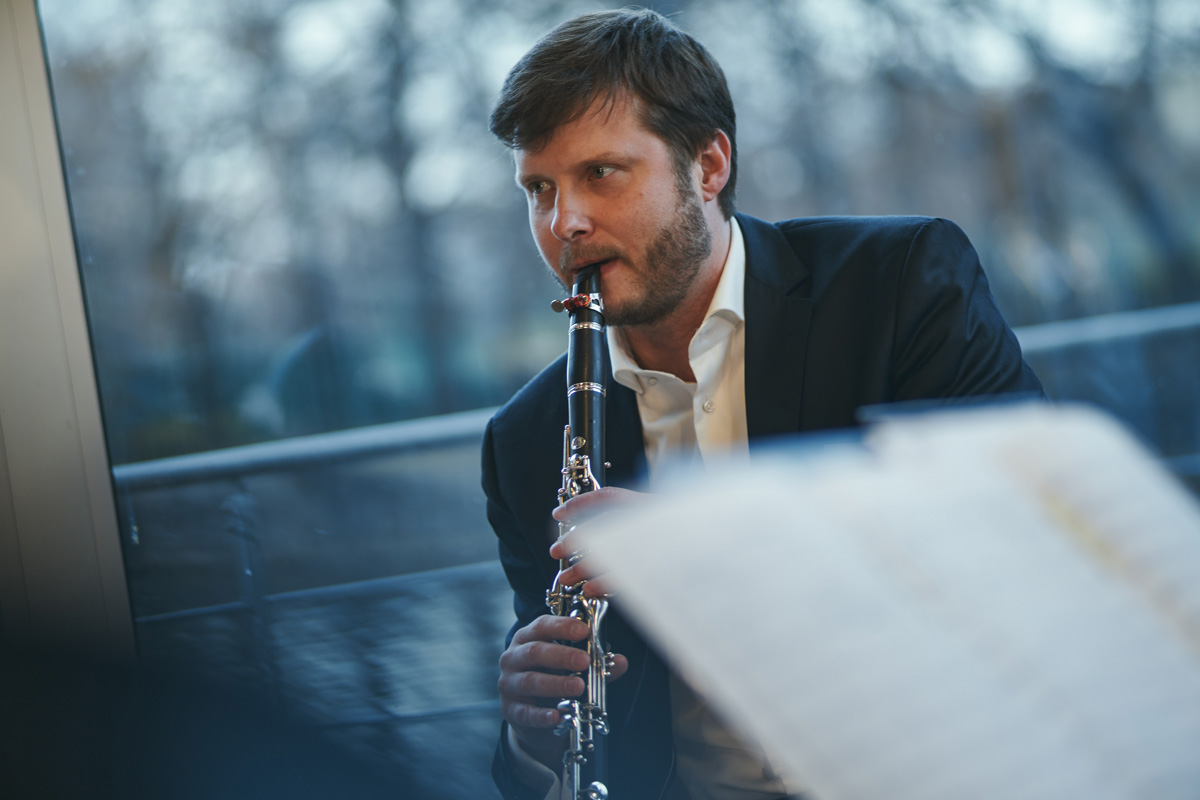
- Born: 15 June 1981 (age 44); Kyjov, Czech Republic
- Occupation: Clarinetist

Irvin Venyš (born 1981) is a Czech clarinetist. He completed his studies at the Brno Conservatory in 2000 under the tutelage of Břetislav Winkler. Venyš continued his education at the Academy of Performing Arts in Prague, earning his Master's degree in 2007 while studying with professors Jiří Hlaváč and Vlastimil Mareš.

In 2005, he received a prestigious one-year scholarship to study at the Conservatoire de Paris, where he worked with professor Michel Arrignon.

Throughout his career, Venyš has competed in numerous national and international competitions, garnering several awards. Notable achievements include second place at the 2004 International Clarinet Competition in Madeira (with no first prize awarded), second place at the Jean Francaix International Clarinet Competition in Paris, and third place at the Markneukirchen International Clarinet Competition. He also claimed first place at the Yamaha Competition in Prague and advanced to the semifinals at the Carl Nielsen International Music Competition in Denmark.

Venyš's most significant triumph came in 2007 when he won first prize and the title of absolute winner at the Pacem in Terris competition in Bayreuth, a prestigious event where he competed alongside leading wind instrumentalists. He also earned second place at the International Clarinet Competition during the Prague Spring International Music Festival.

As a soloist, Venyš has performed in a variety of countries including Spain, France, Germany, Japan, and Switzerland. He has collaborated with renowned musicians such as Hansjörg Schellenberger, Radovan Vlatković, Zakhar Bron, Péter Csaba, Jiří Teml, Márta Gulyás, and Igor Ardašev. His performances have been broadcast by Czech Radio, Czech National Television, and Mitteldeutscher Rundfunk.

In 2024, Venyš played a central role in the Bohuslav Martinů Days festival, where the festival celebrated their 30th year anniversary.

== Discography ==
- 2012 Moving Clarinet
- 2012 Carmina lucemburgiana
- 2013 Crossover
- 2014 Fibich: Symphony No. 2 - At Twilight - Idyll
- 2020 Epoque Quartet – Komp(l)ot
