= Erving =

Erving may refer to:

== People ==
- Cameron Erving (born 1992), American football player
- George W. Erving (1769–1850), American diplomat
- Joona Erving (born 1994), Finnish hockey player
- Julius Erving (born 1950), American basketball player, also known as "Dr. J"
- Erving Goffman (1922–1982), Canadian sociologist and writer
- Erving Walker (born 1990), American basketball player

== Places ==
- Erving, Massachusetts
- Erving Township, Jewell County, Kansas
- Erving State Forest, located in Erving, Warwick, and Orange, Massachusetts

== See also ==
- Earvin
- Earving
- Ervin (disambiguation)
- Ervine
- Erwan
- Erwin (disambiguation)
- Irvin
- Irvine (disambiguation)
- Irving (disambiguation)
- Irwin (disambiguation)
