= Irvin Bomb =

American painter

- Born: Irwin Baum; 1967 (age 58–59); New York City
- Style: Illustrator, painter, filmmaker

Irvin Bomb (born Irwin Baum; 1967) is an American painter, illustrator, and adult filmmaker.

== Early life ==
In Irvin Bomb's early years he loved to draw dinosaurs and cartoons. While in his early 20s, his art shifted towards the rural and urban landscape. Bomb was commissioned in 1991 to paint a portrait of President Teddy Roosevelt which is on permanent public display in the United States Navy Memorial, located in Washington, DC. He later worked as an in-house illustrator at Marvel Entertainment and a freelance illustrator at Valiant Comics.

== Education ==
In 1990 Bomb received his BFA from George Washington University.

== Current ==
Bomb is the webmaster and creator of the erotic art adult website NaughtyArt.com, which combines fine art painting and drawing with videos of art modeling and behind the scenes photo sets which illustrate the painting process. In addition artist tutorials are offered with respect to drawing and painting. Bomb's focus for the past 10 years has been painting the female form and he has documented many of his painting sessions on film. Larry Flynt released Bomb's first two DVDs, Nasty Art, under the LFP imprint. Bomb's DVD series, Naughty Art, focuses heavily on the painting process. His paintings and drawings have been published in BlackBook Magazine, Penthouse Magazine, High Society, and others.

Bomb's shows have aired on pay-per-view TV throughout North America. He was a featured guest on the Comedy Central show Insomniac with Dave Attell. He has an art book published of his paintings titled The Art of Irvin Bomb.

He currently works out of his studio in New York City.
