= Joe Michael Ervin =

American serial killer

- Ervin in 1970
- Born: June 25, 1951; Fort Worth, Texas, U.S.
- Died: July 1, 1981 (aged 30); Adams County Jail, Brighton, Colorado, U.S.
- Cause of death: Suicide by hanging
- Other name: Joe Michael Erwing
- Conviction: N/A
- Penalty: N/A

Details
- Victims: 6
- Span of crimes: 1969–1981
- Country: United States
- States: Texas, Colorado
- Date apprehended: June 27, 1981

Joseph Michael Ervin (June 25, 1951 – July 1, 1981), also known by the alias Joe Michael Erwing, was an American serial killer who was indicted for two murders committed in Texas and Colorado in 1969 and 1981, respectively, but has been posthumously linked to four others committed in the Denver metropolitan area from 1978 to 1981. Ervin was never convicted of the crimes, as he hanged himself while awaiting trial for the final murder.

== Crimes ==
On August 9, 1969, the 17-year-old Ervin, player at the Kirkpatrick High School in Fort Worth, Texas, was hanging around with an unidentified friend near the Berry Bowl bowling alley when he came across a car with two men inside. The pair consisted of 21-year-old Rodney Gene Bonham and his friend Larry Holt, both students at the Tarrant County Junior College who had recently arrived at the establishment to bowl with friends. Ervin and his friend walked up to the driver's window and leaned in to ask him a question, which, depending on the source, was either about offering them a bottle of beer or if Bonham and Holt were waiting for somebody. When Bonham replied that they were about to go inside, Ervin pulled out a pistol and shot him in the neck, threatening to do the same with Holt if he did not do what he ordered him to. Holt pretended to comply, but once they were distracted, he slammed the car door shut, opened the passenger door and fled inside the bowling alley, where he called for help.

Ervin and his accomplice fled the scene and Bonham, who was in critical condition, was driven to the St. Joseph Hospital for treatment. His injuries proved too severe, and Bonham succumbed to them four days later. At the initial stages, police had trouble identifying any suspects due to the seemingly random nature of the killing, which was called 'senseless' by law enforcement. On the same day as this was announced in the news, Ervin phoned the Bonham household and claimed that he was "sorry" for killing their son. One of the detectives assigned to the case, L. V. LeFils, eventually managed to identify Ervin as a potential suspect after he questioned a variety of people in unrelated cases, leading to him being charged with Bonham's murder and a $650 reward for Ervin's arrest.

Fearing arrest, Ervin fled to Colorado and settled in Denver, changing his name to "Joe Michael Erwing" in an attempt to conceal his identity. From 1970 to 1977, Ervin would be repeatedly charged with offenses such as burglary, rape, sexually abusing children, and assault with a deadly weapon, but each time was found not guilty on the grounds of diminished responsibility. Instead of serving jail time, he was repeatedly interned at the Colorado State Hospital in Pueblo, from where he was repeatedly released after months of treatment. Later investigations would reveal that on at least two occasions, typographical errors in listing Ervin's real name and birth date failed to link him to the active arrest warrant in Texas, allowing him to post bail in two cases of rape and theft. Attempts from district attorneys to raise the bail bonds in both cases were also unsuccessful.

=== Release and serial murders ===
On December 7, 1978, Ervin knocked on the door of 33-year-old Madeleine Furey-Livaudais, a housewife who was alone with her two young daughters at the time. When she opened the door, he forced her into the bedroom, where he repeatedly stabbed her until she died. Furey-Livaudais' body was later discovered by her husband, Antonio, as he returned home from work. At the time, Denver police were prevented from properly investigating her killing due to a slew of unrelated murders taking place in their jurisdiction.

On August 10, 1980, Ervin confronted 53-year-old Delores Barajas, an employee at the Fairmont Hotel in downtown Denver, who was walking home from work. He stabbed her multiple times and then dragged her body to the back of a nearby apartment building, where it was found several hours later. On December 21, the body of 27-year-old Gwendolyn Harris was found with multiple stab wounds in the Montbello neighborhood, not far from Ervin's own apartment. Her identity could not positively be established at first, but she was later positively identified after an autopsy at the Denver General Hospital.

On January 24, 1981, Ervin stabbed to death his youngest known victim, 17-year-old Antoinette Parks, in a field in Adams County. At the time of her death, Parks was six to seven months pregnant.

== Arrest and suicide ==
On June 27, Ervin was flagged down by 26-year-old police officer Deborah Sue Corr in Aurora for driving under the influence. As she attempted to arrest him, the pair got into a scuffle, with Ervin managing to get a hold of her gun and subsequently shooting Corr. He then fired the weapon at 19-year-old Glen Spies, an Explorer Scout who had driven by the scene and attempted to help Corr, wounding him as well, before driving away. After the shooting was reported to other officers, he was quickly tracked down to his apartment, where he was attempting to saw off a handcuff bracelet that had been placed on his wrist. Ervin was subsequently charged with Corr's murder and the attempted murder of Glen Spies.

While awaiting trial, Ervin was placed in a solitary cell at the Adams County Jail in Brighton. On July 1, he hanged himself with a makeshift rope made from pieces of a towel, and by the time he was driven to Brighton Community Hospital, he was pronounced dead. Upon examining his jail cell, prison officials found a suicide note in which Ervin expressed remorse for his crimes and begged for forgiveness from his victims and the residents of Denver. Due to his death, Bonham and Corr's murders were officially closed. Spies, who fully recovered from his injuries, was later awarded $10,000 by the city of Aurora for his bravery.

=== Identification ===
At the time of his death, Ervin was not considered a suspect in the murders of Furey-Livaudais, Barajas, Harris, and Parks, all of which were initially believed to be unrelated to one another and investigated separately. Between 2013 and 2018, the four cases were finally linked via DNA evidence, and in the following year, the Denver Police Crime Laboratory started reinvestigating the cold cases. In the summer of 2021, they found an ancestral link in Texas, which upon further investigation led them to Joe Michael Ervin, whose body had been buried at a cemetery in Arlington, Texas. His body was exhumed to extract DNA from his remains, which conclusively linked him to the four murders in January 2022. As a result, the Denver Police Department announced that they would be closing the cases, as they now considered them solved. Surviving family members of the victims attended the press conference, expressing relief that the murders of their relatives had finally been solved.

== See also ==
- List of serial killers in the United States
