= Irving Equipment =

Canadian equipment rental company

- Industry: Crane Rental, Heavy Lift and Specialized Transportation, Pile Driving, Project Management
- Founded: 1958
- Headquarters: Saint John, New Brunswick; Canada
- Website: irvingequipment.com

Irving Equipment is a division of J.D. Irving, Limited that supports various construction industries in the Saint John area of New Brunswick, including shipbuilding, oil refining (Irving Oil), and pulp and paper mill expansions. The division can trace its roots back to 1958.

Irving Equipment is a member of the Crane Rental Association of Canada as one of the many companies involved with its formation, with the 2008–2009 Chairman being Irving Equipment's Roger Cyr. Kyle Jardine of Irving Equipment currently sits on the 2010–2011 CRAC Board of Directors.

== Business activities ==
With the expansion of the Saint John Irving Oil refinery, in the mid-70's they expanded into pile driving and in 1984, Irving Equipment separated out its civil contracting operations to form Gulf Operators.

== Awards and recognition ==
In 1994, two Professional Engineers, Fred Dickinson and Jeff Dacey, received the individual Award for Technical Excellence from the New Brunswick Society of Professional Engineers for their work on CraneCad.

In 2008, Irving Equipment received a 30-year Longevity Award from the Specialty Carriers and Rigging Association.

Irving Equipment is listed on the American Cranes and Transport ACT 50, which has now expanded to the ACT100, its annual assessment of the continent's top crane-owning companies. In 2009, Irving Equipment ranked 31st in its ACT100 list. And in 2010, increased to number 27.

In 2008, International Crane and Specialized Transport Magazine ranked them 45th on the IC50, a list of the top crane owning companies in the world. In 2009, Irving Equipment moved up to 44th in the list, and held that position for the 2010 IC50 listing.

== Irving Crane ==
In 1999, Irving Equipment expanded into the United States when they opened a crane rental office in Eliot, Maine under the name Irving Equipment Inc. Additional offices were later added in Hampton, New Hampshire and Burlington, Massachusetts. In 2008, a branch was added in Charleston, West Virginia.

In 2009, the company began operating in the United States as Irving Crane.

== CraneCAD ==
CraneCAD Lift Example.

In 1987, Irving Equipment developed its own lift planning software called CraneCAD. This software was built on top of the AutoCAD platform by two Professional Engineers, Fred Dickinson and Jeff Dacey, and the project received partial funding from the National Research Council of Canada. Using CraneCAD, engineers are able to create three-dimensional models of their project site to accurately determine the type of crane and the precise lift configuration required for each lift.
