= Robert Irving =

Robert Irving may refer to:

- Robert Irving (industrialist) (1954–2026), Canadian industrialist
- Robert Irving (conductor) (1913–1991), orchestral conductor, son of Robert Lock Graham Irving
- Bob Irving (rugby league) (1948–1999), rugby league player of the 1960s and 1970s
- Robert Lock Graham Irving (1877–1969), schoolteacher, author and mountaineer
- Robert Irving III (born 1953), American musician
- Robert Grant Irving, American architectural historian
- Bob Irving (sportscaster) (born 1950), Canadian football sportscaster
- Robert Irving (naval officer) (1877–1954), Scottish officer of the Royal Naval Reserve and the British Merchant Navy

== See also ==
- Robert Irvine (disambiguation)
- Robert Irwin (disambiguation)
- Bob Irvin (born 1948), leader of the Republican Party in Georgia in the United States
