= Irvin Lukežić =

Croatian author (born 1961)

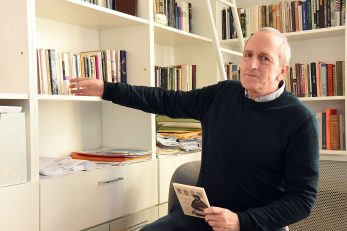
- Born: 13 April 1961 (age 65); Rijeka, Croatia

Irvin Lukežić (born April 13, 1961) is a Croatian author known for his work in Croatian literature and culture.

== Biography ==
Irvin Lukežić was born on April 13, 1961, in Rijeka, Croatia. He studied Croatian Studies at the University of Rijeka and graduated in 1983. Today, he is a full professor there, teaching courses on older Croatian literature and Croatian culture.

In 1992, Lukežić earned his master's degree from the University of Zagreb with a thesis on literary themes in Croatian periodicals from the Istrian-Kurnerski circle between 1900 and 1914. He continued his studies and completed his doctorate in 1996, with a dissertation titled Prose in Burgenland Croats.

Over the years, Lukežić has been involved with the Svetozar Ritig Institute in Zagreb as a part-time associate. He also worked as a librarian at the Science Library, now known as the University Library in Rijeka. His writing spans various topics, including literature, history, culture, and ethnology, and his articles have appeared in many well-known publications like Dometi, Istria, and Novi list.

Lukežić has taken on several editorial roles. He was the editor-in-chief for different editions of the Grobnik Proceedings and edited the commemorative book Documents and Remembrance. He also led the journal Fluminenia and was involved in the proceedings for the international conference Rijeka and Hungarian Culture. His work often focuses on the history of Grobnišćina, Rijeka, and the Croatian Littoral, such as the works of Viktor Car Emin and Vladimir Nazor.

Since 1994, he has participated in many scientific conferences in Croatia and abroad. He has explored creative writing, particularly drama, with one of his plays staged by acting students in Rijeka in 1992. Additionally, he has translated works from Italian, English, and Slovenian.

Lukežić's academic work has earned him numerous awards. He received the University of Rijeka Award twice for his research while he was a student and was honored by the Municipality of Jelenje for his book Grobnik Biographical Lexicon in 1994. In 2006, he also received the City of Rijeka Award for his contributions to the cultural history of the city as that's what his work has mainly focused on.

== Selected works ==
Lukežić is the author of several notable publications, including:

- Fiuman Stories (1991)
- Grobnik Biographical Lexicon (1994)
- Mario Schittar (1995)
- Ivan Fiamin (1996)
- Prose in Burgenland Croats (1997)
- Gradišćansko Croatian Literature (1998)
- Liburnian Torso (1999)
- Knjiga brašćine Sv. Marije Tepačke u Grobniku (2002)
- Rijeka Glozes (2004)
- History of Rijeka Consulates (2004)
- Sky over Kvarner (2005)
- Ogledalo bašćinsko (2006)
- Music Trsat 1906-2006 (with Lovorka Ruck, 2006)
- Fluminensia Slovenica (2007)
- Rijeka Quartet (2008)
- Robert Whitehead – English Torpedo Manufacturer from Rijeka (2010)
- Literary-Historical Viewpoints (2010)
- Ferruccio Busoni: Faust from Toscane (2011)
- Adonis' Shadow – In Memory of John Keats (2012)
- Chamber of Commerce in Rijeka from the Illyrian Provinces to Today (2015)
- Arcadia and Leisure: Two Tusculan Discourses (2018)
- In the Temple of Terpsichore – From the History of the Rijeka Public Reading Room (2019)
- Hreljinski trolist (2019)
- Fijumani – Collective in the Urban Landscape (2020)
- Fran Kurelac and Rijeka's Slovene Books (2021)
- Kvarner-Istrian Mirrors and Studies (2022)

In addition to his books, he has written numerous articles covering literature, history, culture, and ethnology for various journals, such as Dometi, Istria, Forum, Novi list, and Vinodolski zbornik. He has also taken on editorial roles for several journals, including Grobnik Proceedings, Documents and Remembrance, and Fluminensia, and has co-edited conference proceedings related to Rijeka and Hungarian culture.
