= Robert Irwin (disambiguation) =

Robert Irwin (born 2003) is an Australian conservationist.

Robert Irwin may also refer to:

- Robert Irwin (North Carolina politician) (1738–1800), general of the American militia in the Revolutionary War
- Robert Irwin (Canadian politician) (1865–1941), Canadian politician
- Robert Irwin (artist) (1928–2023), American installation artist
- Robert Irwin (writer) (1946–2024), British historian, novelist and writer on Arabic literature
- Robert Irwin Jr. (1797–1833), United States territorial legislator
- Robert George Irwin (1908–1975), American sculptor convicted in 1937 murder spree in New York City
- Robert Walker Irwin (1844–1925), American businessman and Hawaiian representative to Japan
- Bob Irwin (born 1939), Australian conservationist and co-founder of the Australia Zoo; paternal grandfather of the younger Australian conservationist
- Bobby Irwin (1953–2015), English drummer, record producer and songwriter

== See also ==
- Robert Irvine (disambiguation)
- Robert Irving (disambiguation)
