= Earvin =

Earvin is a given name. Notable people with the name include:

- Earvin "Magic" Johnson (born 1959), American executive and former basketball player
- Earvin "EJ" Johnson (born 1992), son of Magic; American television personality
- Earvin N'Gapeth (born 1991), French volleyball player

== See also ==
- Earving
- Ervin (disambiguation)
- Ervine
- Erving (disambiguation)
- Erwan
- Erwin (disambiguation)
- Irvin
- Irvine (disambiguation)
- Irving (disambiguation)
- Irwin (disambiguation)
