= Irvin Masličić =

Montenegrin painter (born 1981)

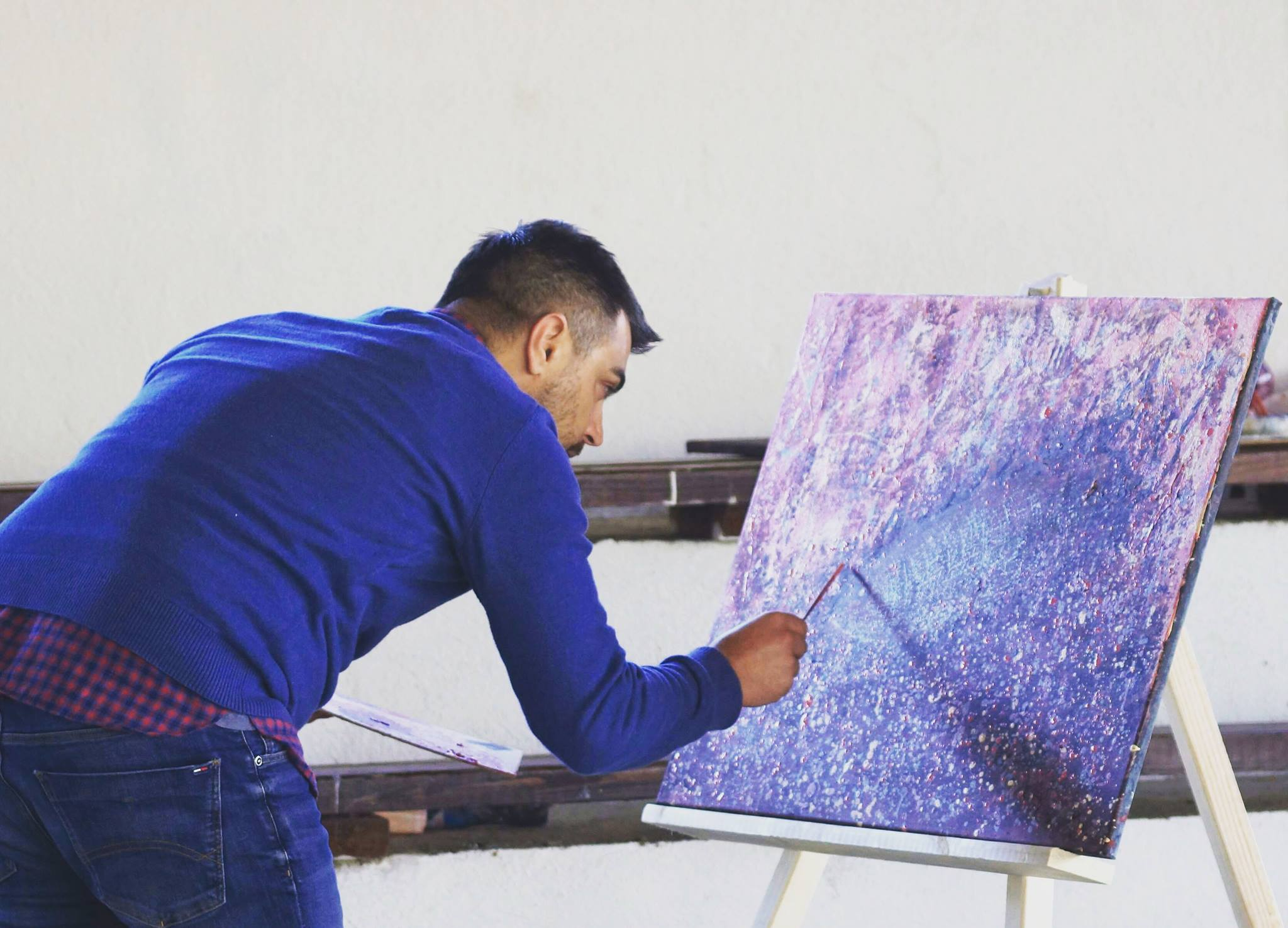
- Born: 16 December 1981 (age 44); Berane, Montenegro
- Education: Academy of Fine Arts in Sarajevo
- Known for: Painting

Irvin Masličić (born December 16, 1981) is a Montenegrin artist recognized for his paintings that explore themes of nature, particularly underwater landscapes.

== Background ==
Masličić was born into a Bosniak family in Berane, Montenegro. His parents are Suad and Sabaheta Masličić, both of whom are artists. Irvin attended the Academy of Fine Arts in Sarajevo in 2006, where he studied under Professor Radoslav Tadić. He demonstrated talent in visual arts and received recognition in international competitions for children's art, achieving awards from locations such as Belgrade, Novi Sad, Split, Croatia, and Bitola, as well as from countries like China, Finland, Poland, and Slovakia.

Since 2008, Irvin has been a member of the Association of Fine Artists of Montenegro and currently works as an art editor at the Public Institution Center for Culture in Berane. He leads a creative painting workshop known as Paint Club. As of 2023, he has held 13 solo exhibitions and participated in over 40 group exhibitions. Notable among his exhibitions is Aquarius, held in Sarajevo, which featured thirty paintings focused on marine life and underwater scenes.

In February 2022, he served as a selector for the 55th Hercegnov Zimski Likovni Salon, where he aimed to showcase a diversity of artistic styles and techniques from the region.

Masličić's work often draws inspiration from natural environments, with a focus on landscapes and aquatic ecosystems in Montenegro. He describes his paintings as combining observed and imagined elements that reflect his connection to these themes. Color is a significant aspect of his work, conveying different qualities of light and shadow. His artistic practice emphasizes the exploration of natural beauty and encourages viewers to consider conservation of these essential resources.

Masličić has been recognized for his contributions to the cultural landscape of Montenegro, holding various roles in international art colonies and exhibitions. His work combines traditional painting techniques with contemporary themes, establishing his presence in the Montenegrin art community.

Irvin is a member of the Democratic Party of Socialists of Montenegro.

== Exhibitions ==
- "Aquarius" - Gallery Roman Petrović, Sarajevo
- "World of Silence" - Gallery Velimir A. Leković, Bar
- Queen of Montenegro in Bečići, Montenegro
- 55th Hercegnov Winter Art Salon, Herceg Novi
