= Lake Irving =

Lake in the state of Minnesota, United States

- Location within Minnesota
- Location: Beltrami County, Minnesota
- Coordinates: 47°27′34″N 94°53′4″W
- Type: lake

Lake Irving is a lake in Beltrami County, Minnesota, in the United States.

Lake Irving was named for Washington Irving, the American author.

== See also ==
- List of lakes in Minnesota
