= Irving Kaplan (chemist) =

Chemist and Massachusetts Institute of Technology professor

Irving Kaplan (1913–1997) was a chemist and a Massachusetts Institute of Technology professor, who was among the founders of the Department of Nuclear Engineering at the institution.

== Biography ==
Kaplan received a BA from Columbia University in 1933, an MA in 1934 and a PhD in chemistry in 1937. Before coming to MIT, he was a researcher in chemistry at the Michael Reese Hospital in Chicago from 1937 to 1941. He participated in the Manhattan Project to do research on isotope separation. Kaplan was also a lead founding member of the Federation of American Scientists, and worked with other scientists to promote civilian control of the atomic energy. This eventually led the way to the creation of the U.S. Atomic Energy Commission (AEC) in 1947. From 1946 to 1957, he worked as a senior physicist at the Brookhaven National Laboratory on Long Island, and wrote a textbook on nuclear physics. Kaplan visited MIT in 1957, and became a professor in 1958 to participate in the new department. He participated in various projects such as the research on lattices of partially enriched uranium rods in heavy water, and development of graduate and undergraduate courses such as the history of science and classical Greek.

== Works ==
- Kaplan, I. (1955). Nuclear Physics. Addison-Wesley Books in Nuclear Science and Engineering. Addison-Wesley Publishing Company. (2nd 1962)

== Personal life ==
Professor Kaplan had a wife, two sons and one daughter, and four grandchildren. He died at the Massachusetts General Hospital on April 10 after a heart surgery.
