= Erwin Dom Osen =

Austrian artist (1891–1970)

Dominik Osen (1891–1970), also known as Erwin Dom Osen and Mime Van Osen, was an Austrian Expressionist painter, cabaret performer, and mime.

Osen was born to a Japanese father and Austrian mother, but orphaned at an early age. At six, he entered the ballet school of the Vienna Court Opera, where its director, the composer/conductor Gustav Mahler, recognized his exceptional gift for design and fostered his education. In 1907, he studied painting privately with Gustav Klimt. He then enrolled at the Vienna Academy, where he met and befriended Egon Schiele, with whom he and others co-founded the Neukunstgruppe ("New Art Group").

Osen modeled for his friend Schiele, the Austrian Expressionist painter, in a series of portraits during the early 1900s. Schiele's portrayals of Osen (and of fellow model Max Oppenheimer) are noteworthy as not simply anatomical studies, but "explorations of human sexuality" for which the two served as muses. Jane Kallir, author of Schiele's catalogue raissoné, noted how daring this was, as homosexuality was illegal in Austria at the time, and "any kind of homoerotic impulse was totally suppressed... something that no one would be able to openly demonstrate in any way, shape, or form.”

In 1912, in a vulnerable state, Schiele moved into Osen’s Vienna studio, but came to view Osen as “an imposter” who passed off his works as Schiele’s. Worse, per Schiele's biographer Arthur Roessler, he stole Schiele’s own drawings, his paints, brushes, and paper and sold them. (Roessler’s unflattering account of Osen and Schiele's relationship led Osen to sue Roessler, leading to the withdrawal of a later edition.) Schiele ended the friendship.

In 2021, the Leopold Museum in Vienna exhibited "The Body Electric", dedicated to Osen's drawings made while a patient at the Garrison Hospital II. Stefan Jellinek, a doctor at the hospital, commissioned the drawings to document and research the uses and dangers of electricity to restore health. The exhibit noted that the drawings "afford insight into wartime military medicine and also offer a new view on Vienna’s art history, pointing out the importance of clinical settings for the development of modernist portraiture and figuration."
