= Irvin Mujčić =

Bosnian human rights activist

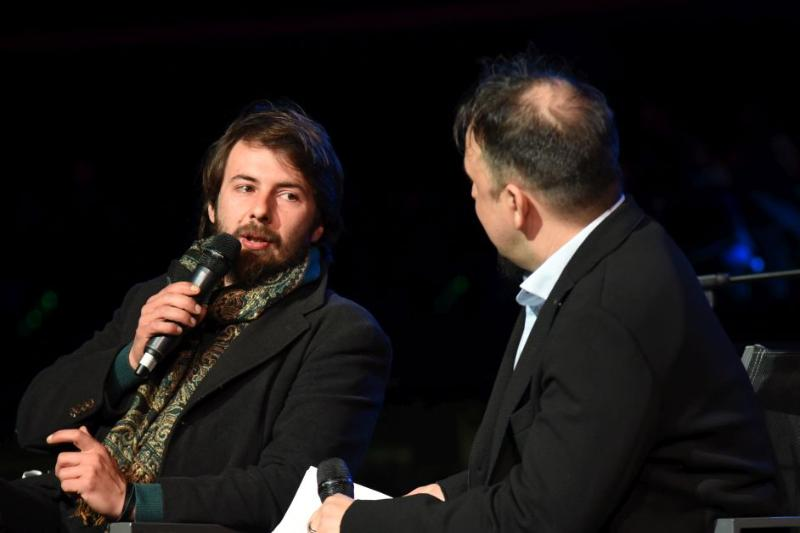
- Born: 5 December 1987 (age 38); Srebrenica, Bosnia and Herzegovina
- Education: Sapienza University of Rome
- Occupations: Human rights activist, tour guide
- Organization: Srebrenica - City of Hope

Irvin Mujčić (born December 5, 1987) is a Bosnian human rights activist, tour guide, and survivor of the Srebrenica genocide who runs the Srebrenica - City of Hope project, which focuses on sustainable tourism and community development, along with the preservation of natural and cultural heritage within the city of Srebrenica.

== Biography ==
Irvin Mujčić was born on December 5, 1987, in Srebrenica, Bosnia and Herzegovina. At the age of 5, during the Bosnian War, Irvin fled Srebrenica with his mother, brother, and sister. His father, along with 20 other family members, stayed in Srebrenica and would end up as some of the more than 8,000 victims of the Srebrenica massacre - his father's remains are yet to be discovered. Irvin, with his mother and siblings, was welcomed in Italy, as a war refugee, in the Val Camonica area.

Irvin lived in Italy for more than 20 years, in a small village in the Alps. He completed his philosophy studies in Rome and began working in human rights, focusing on Roma children from the Balkans, aided by his knowledge of local languages. In addition to those, he speaks Italian, French, and English. Irvin dedicated his life to human rights projects around the world, including Egypt, Tunisia, and Belgium.

In 2014, Irvin returned to Srebrenica in order to devote his life to the reconstruction of an ancient village in Srebrenica in order to create a welcoming destination for visitors and students. By 2017, with the collaboration of Prijatelji Prirode Oaza Mira and Italian Amici della Natura Group, Srebrenica - City of Hope was created. The goal of the project is to provide a space where they can explore the natural beauty of the area and learn about its history and the local community.

In 2020, Irvin made a statement on the occasion of the European Holocaust Memorial Day for Sinti and Roma, which is organized by the Council of Europe.

In January 2025, a documentary film titled Il ragazzo della Drina (The Boy from the River Drina), written and directed by Zijad Ibrahimović, with a screenplay by Marzio G. Mian and Nicola Scevola, was released. The film stars Irvin and tells his story. It was one of six nominees for the prestigious Prix de Soleure competition at the 60th Solothurn Film Festival.
