= Irving D. Kaplan =

American radiation oncologist

Irving David Kaplan is an American radiation oncologist at Beth Israel Deaconess Medical Center in Boston, Massachusetts, and an assistant professor at Harvard Medical School. Kaplan attended medical school at Stanford University School of Medicine in 1985, interned at Kaiser Foundation Hospital in internal medicine at Santa Barbara in 1986. He completed his residency in radiation oncology at Standard in 1989.
