= Irvin Hušić =

Bosnian racing cyclist (born 1982)

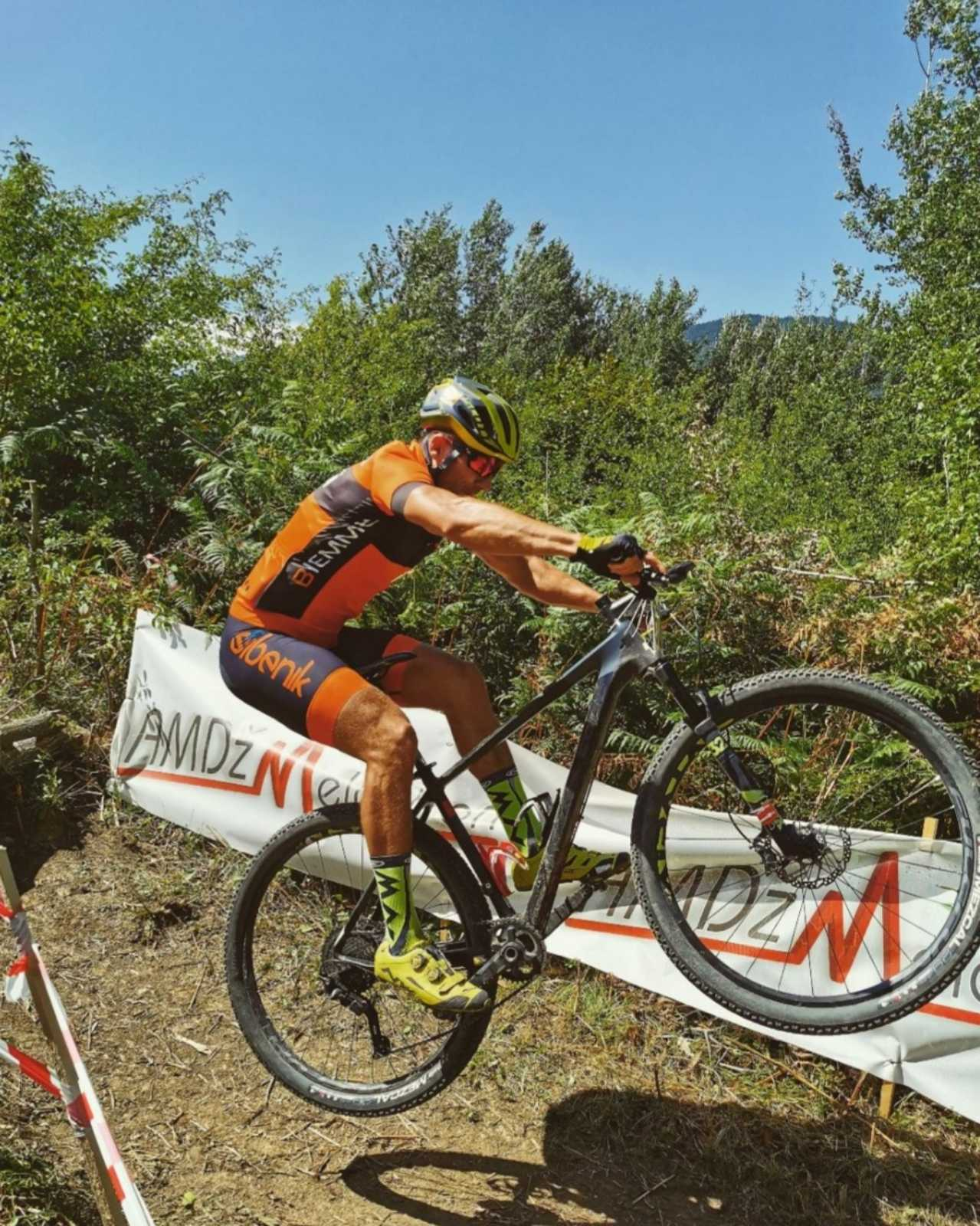

Personal information
- Full name: Irvin Hušić
- Born: 3 January 1982 (age 44) Cazin, Bosnia and Herzegovina

Cycling career
- Sport: Cycling
- Current team: BK Faust Vrančić
Medal record
Gold medal – first place	2021 Balkan MTB Championship

Irvin Hušić (born 3 January 1982) is a Bosnian racing cyclist. Irvin was born in the city of Cazin, Bosnia and Herzegovina and is part of the Faust Vrančić cycling club.

== Career ==
In 2018, Irvin finished first place in the Veteran A category during the annual Na Dva Kola Oko Bola hosted by the Croatian Cycling Federation. Also in 2018, Irvin finished first place in the first mountain bike marathon held in Rab, Big Four. In 2019, he finished first in the Uspon na Bikovo by climbing the Bikovo mountain range in a time of 1 hour and 56 minutes, a race in which he originally finished in second place when he participated in 2017. In 2021, Irvin won the gold medal in the Master A category at the Balkan MTB Championship held in Bihać.

Irvin is part of the Faust Vrančić cycling club, which was established in Šibenik, Croatia. In 2018, the club had their best marathon run on the Vlašić mountain in Bosnia and Herzegovina during the XC Marathon Vlašić, in which Irvin placed 2nd within category M35.

== Major results ==
2018
1st Na Dva Kola Oko Bola
1st Big Four
2019
1st Uspon na Bikovo
2021
1st Balkan MTB Championship, Master A
