= Irve =

Irve may refer to:

== People ==
- Irve Libby (born 1950), pardoned convicted criminal, disbarred lawyer, and aide to the President and Vice President of the United States, George W. Bush and Dick Cheney, respectively
- Irve Stauffer, husband of kidnap victim Mary and father kidnap victim of Elizabeth; see biopic Abducted: The Mary Stauffer Story

== Other uses ==
- NASA Inflatable Reentry Vehicle Experiment (IRVE), a series of experimental heatshields
- Irbe River
