= Irving =

Irving may refer to:

== People ==
- Irving (name), including a list of people with the name

=== Fictional characters ===
- Irving, the main character's love interest in the comic strip Cathy (1976–2010)
- Lloyd Irving, the protagonist in the video game Tales of Symphonia (2003)
- Irving, an anthropomorphic train on the BBC children's TV series Chuggington (2008–2021)

== Places ==
=== Canada ===
- Irving Nature Park, a park in Saint John, N.B.

=== United States ===
- Irving, California, former name of Irvington, California
- Irving, Illinois
- Irving, Iowa
- Irving (Duluth), Minnesota
- Irving, New York
- Irving, Texas
- Irving, Wisconsin, a town
  - Irving (community), Wisconsin, an unincorporated community
- Irving Park, Chicago, Illinois
- Irving Township, Montgomery County, Illinois
- Irving Township, Michigan
- Irving Township, Minnesota
- Lake Irving, a lake in Minnesota

== Companies ==
- Irving Group of Companies, Canadian conglomerate based in Saint John, New Brunswick, controlled by the Irving family, including:
  - J. D. Irving, a conglomerate with holdings in forestry, pulp and paper, tissue, newsprint, building supplies, frozen food, transportation, shipping lines, and ship building, including
    - Irving Tissue
    - Irving Shipbuilding
    - Irving Equipment
    - Irving Oil
      - Irving Oil Refinery
- Irving Trust, formerly a large New York bank, merged into Bank of New York in 1988
- Irving (talent agency), based in Tokyo, Japan

== Other uses ==
- Irving (band), an American indie rock band
- "Irving", World War II Allied code-name for the Japanese Nakajima J1N aircraft
- Operation Irving, a military operation that took place in Vietnam in October 1966
- "Irving", designation for Gekko in the video game Metal Gear Solid 4
- Irving, a magic sword belonging to Joe the Barbarian in Jack Chalker's Dancing Gods series of fantasy novels
- "Irving (Jaggered Sixteenths)", the B-side instrumental jazz tune accompanying The Crystals' 1964 A-side hit "All Grown Up"

== See also ==
- Erving (disambiguation)
- Irvine (disambiguation)
- Irve (disambiguation)
- IRV (disambiguation)
