= Erwan =

Erwan (Breton pronunciation: [ˈeʁwãn]) is a masculine Breton given name, sometimes spelled Erwann. Its francization is the French given name Yves.

== Etymology ==
From Old Breton given name Eudon. It might thus be formed of Proto-Brythonic words eu- "well, good" and *don "talent, natural gift, ability" (compare Welsh dawn and Irish dán), or derived from Gaulish name Esugenos.

Sometimes allegedly supposed to come from the Breton word aerouant "dragon" because of homophony in Modern Breton.

=== Variants ===
- Masculine : Erwann, Erwane, Eroan, Ervoan, Ervan, Earwinn, Érwann, Érwan, Even or Ewen, Ewan or Evan, Iwan, Eozen, Cheun, Youen, Youenn, If, Ivi or Yvi, Von, Yeun, Yoen, Youn, Yvelin, Hélori, Hélaurie, Herwan, Herwann, Aerwan
- Feminine : Erwana, Erwanez, Youna, Youena, Vonig.

== Notable people ==
Notable people with the name include:

- Erwan Bergot (1930–1993), French Army officer and writer
- Erwan Berthou (1861–1933), French poet, writer and bard
- Erwan Bouroullec (born 1976), French designer, see Ronan & Erwan Bouroullec
- Erwan Colas (born 1997), French footballer
- Erwan Dianteill (born 1967), French anthropologist and sociologist
- Erwan Kepoa Falé (born 1991 or 1992), French actor
- Erwan Setiawan (born 1970), Indonesian politician and Deputy Governor of West Java (2025-2030)
- Erwan Pain (born 1986), French ice hockey player
- Erwan Quintin (born 1984), French footballer
- Erwan Regulus (born 2000), French footballer
- Erwan Vallerie (1944–2022), French economist and Breton nationalist
- Charlie "Erwan" Dodson, Belgian dubstep musician
