= Ervin (given name) =

- Gender: Male

Other gender
- Feminine: Ervina

Origin
- Meaning: Fresh water, green water, friend of the sea, mariner, army friend, tested and experienced
- Region of origin: Europe

Other names
- Variant forms: Irvin; Arvin (آروین)

Ervin is a male given name of Indo-European origin, meaning "green water," "fresh water," "friend of the sea," or "army friend." It is believed to have either originated from Old English or Old Gaelic, referring to its water-related meanings, or from the German language, where it signifies "friend of the army."

In German, it is typically written as Erwin, but in many other European nations where the name is popular—namely Albania, Bosnia and Herzegovina, Croatia, Estonia, Hungary, and Romania—it is written as Ervin. Ervin's popularity in Eastern European nations may be attributed to the influence of the Austro-Hungarian Empire on linguistic and naming conventions.

In the Balkans, particularly in Albania, Bosnia and Herzegovina, and Croatia, the name is popular. Ervin was the 87th most popular male name in Bosnia and Herzegovina in 2010 and it remains as one of the most popular male given names in the country. In these countries, the name is also spelled as Irvin, which has emerged as a modern variation of the name. The female variant of the name in this region is Ervina.

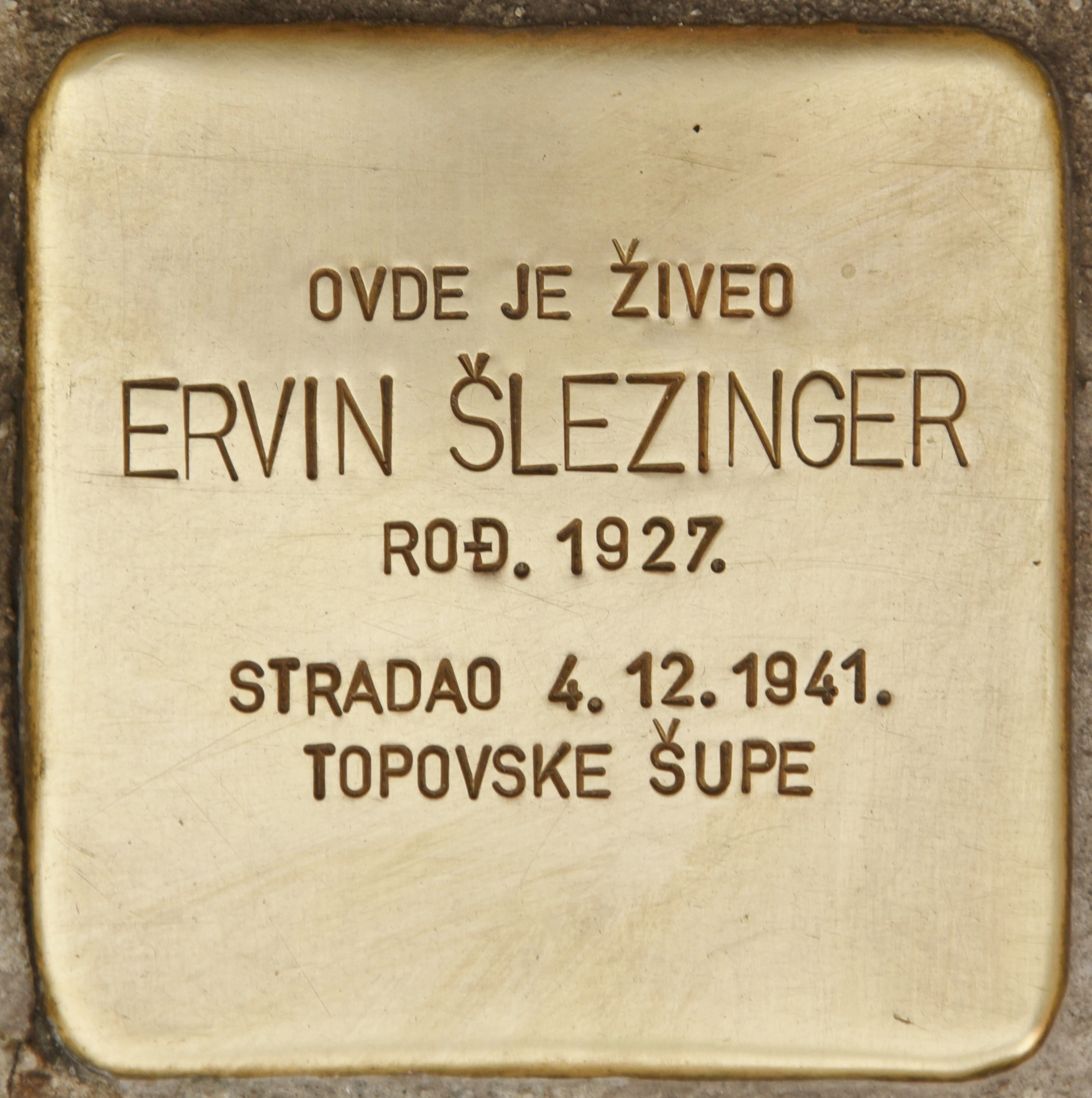
Plaque written in Bosnian-Croatian-Serbian, which mentions Ervin Šlezinger, a teenage Yugoslav victim of the Topovske Šupe concentration camp

== Given name ==
- Ervin Abel (1929–1984), Estonian actor
- Ervin Acél, multiple people
- Ervin G. Bailey (1880–1974), American mechanical engineer
- Ervin Baktay (1890–1963), Hungarian author
- Ervin Baldwin (born 1986), American football defensive end
- Ervin Bauer (1890–1938), Hungarian biologist
- Ervin Boban (born 1965), Croatian footballer
- Ervin Bossányi (1891–1975), Hungarian artist
- Ervin M. Bruner (1915–2008), American politician
- Ervin Bulku (born 1981), Albanian football player
- Ervin Bushati (born 1975), Albanian politician
- Ervin Cherry (born 1966), American serial killer
- Ervin Conradt (1916–2001), American politician
- Ervin Cseh (1838–1918), Hungarian politician
- Ervin Demeter (born 1954), Hungarian politician
- Ervin Dennis (born 1936), American politician
- Ervin Dér (1956–2024), Hungarian cyclist
- Ervin Drake (1919–2015), American songwriter
- Ervin Duggan (born 1939), American retired media businessman
- Ervin E. Dupper (1923–2017), American politician
- Ervin Eleskovic (born 1987), Bosnian professional tennis player
- Ervin Fakaj (born 1976), former Albanian footballer
- Ervin Feldheim (1912–1944), Hungarian mathematician
- Ervin Fodor, British virologist
- Ervin Fowlkes (1922–1994), American professional baseball player
- Ervin Fritz (born 1940), Slovene poet, playwright and translator
- Ervin Y. Galantay (1930–2011), Hungarian-American architect
- Ervin Gashi (born 1990), Swiss football coach of Kosovar descent
- Ervin Gibson (died 1983), American murder victim
- Ervin González (born 1985), Colombian football forward
- Ervin A. Gonzalez (1960–2017), American lawyer
- Ervin Haág (1933–2018), Hungarian chess player
- Ervin Hall (born 1947), American athlete
- Ervin Hatibi (born 1974), Albanian poet, essayist and painter
- Ervin Hervé-Lóránth (born 1969), Hungarian visual artist
- Ervin Hoffmann (born 1969), Hungarian sprint canoeist
- Ervín Hoida (1918–2024), World War II veteran
- Ervin Holpert (born 1986), Serbian canoeist
- Ervin Hoxha (born 1978), Albanian politician
- Ervin Hunt (born 1947), American former NFL player
- Ervin Ibrahimović (born 1972), Montenegrin politician
- Ervin Inniger (born 1945), American basketball player
- Ervin Johnson (born 1967), American former professional basketball player
- Ervin L. Jordan Jr., American historian
- Ervin Kačar (born 1991), Serbian association football player
- Ervin Kassai (1925–2012), Hungarian basketball referee
- Ervin Katnić (1921–1979), Yugoslav footballer
- Ervin Katona (born 1977), Serbian strongman competitor
- Ervin Kereszthy (1909–1972), Hungarian rower
- Ervin Kleffman (1892–1987), American composer
- Ervín Kováč (1911–1972), Czechoslovak soccer player
- Ervin Kovács (born 1967), Hungarian football player
- Ervin Kurti (born 1995), Serbian footballer
- Ervin Lamçe (born 1972), Albanian footballer
- Ervin László (born 1932), Hungarian philosopher
- Ervin Lázár (1936–2006), Hungarian author
- Ervin Llani (born 1983), Albanian footballer
- Ervin Marton (1912–1968), Hungarian photographer
- Ervin Jose Massinga, American diplomat
- Ervin McSweeney (born 1957), New Zealand cricketer
- Ervin Mészáros (1877–1940), Hungarian Olympic fencer
- Ervin Memetov (born 1990), Ukrainian footballer
- Ervin Moldován (born 1978), Romanian ice hockey player
- Ervin Mórich (1897–1982), Hungarian rower
- Ervin Mueller (1904–1986), American salesman and politician
- Ervin Nyiregyházi (1903–1987), Hungarian-born American pianist
- Ervin Ollik (1915–1996), Estonian footballer
- Ervin Omić (born 2003), Austrian professional footballer
- Ervin Õunapuu (born 1956), Estonian writer, playwright, stage designer and filmmaker
- Ervin Parker (born 1958), American football player
- Ervin Plány (1885–1916), Hungarian painter
- Ervin Pringle (1910–1991), Canadian business consultant, director and hatcheryman
- Ervin Pruitt (born 1940), race car driver from South Carolina
- Ervin Randle (born 1962), American football linebacker
- Ervin Rexha (born 1991), Albanian footballer
- Ervin J. Rokke (born 1939), American retired lieutenant general
- Ervin Roszner (1852–1928), Hungarian politician
- Ervin T. Rouse (1917–1981), American songwriter
- Ervin Rustemagić (born 1952), Bosnian comic producer and distributor
- Ervin J. Ryczek (1909–2006), American politician and funeral director
- Ervin Ryta (born 1978), Albanian footballer
- Ervin Santana (born 1982), American baseball player
- Ervin Schiffer (born 1932), Hungarian born professional violist and pedagogue
- Ervin Schneeberg (1919–1995), American businessman and politician
- Ervin Harold Schulz (1911–1978), American businessman, newspaper editor, and politician
- Ervin Sejdic (born 1979), Bosnian-American researcher
- Ervin Šinko (1898–1967), Croatian writer, publisher and poet
- Ervin Skela (born 1976), Albanian retired footballer
- Ervin Smajlagić (born 1976), Bosnian retired footballer
- Ervin Somogyi (born 1944), Hungarian maker of high-end steel string guitars
- Ervin Sotto (born 1981), Filipino professional basketball player
- Ervin Staub (born 1938), Hungarian-American professor
- Ervin Szörenyi (born 1932), Hungarian sprint canoeist who competed in the mid-1950s
- Ervin Szabó (1877–1918), Hungarian anarchist and librarian
- Ervin Szerelemhegyi (1891–1969), Hungarian track and field athlete
- Ervin Taha (born 1999), French footballer
- Ervin Tjon-A-Loi (born 1995), Surinamese footballer
- Ervin Vaca (born 2004), Bolivian association footballer
- Ervin Yen (born 1954), American politician
- Ervin Zádor (1934–2012), Hungarian retired water polo player
- Ervin Zsiga (born 1991), Romanian footballer
- Ervin Zukanović (born 1987), Bosnian association football player

== In fiction ==
- Ervin Burrell, fictional character on the HBO drama The Wire

== See also ==
- Earvin
- Ervin (disambiguation)
- Ervin (surname)
- Erving (disambiguation)
- Erwan
- Ervine
- Erwin (disambiguation)
- Irvin
- Irvine
- Irving
- Irwin (disambiguation)
