= Arvin (disambiguation) =

Arvin has several meanings:

- A city in California; see Arvin.
- For the given name and surname, and people with this name, see Arvin (name).
- Arvin Industries, Inc., merged with Meritor Automotive, Inc. in 2000
- MV Arvin, a bulk cargo ship that sunk in 2021
- Arvin Babajee, Mauritian politician

== See also ==
- ARVN, the Army of the Republic of Vietnam
- Arvind, a similar Indian given name
