= Reingold =

Reingold is a surname and given name. Notable people with the name include:

== Surname ==
- Arvin Reingold (1930–2020), American lawyer and politician
- Babs Reingold, American artist
- David Reingold (born 1968), American sociologist
- Edward Reingold (born 1945), computer scientist
- Isaac Reingold (born 1873), pen name of Isaac Tomim, Russian-born American poet, lyricist, and singer
- Jeremy Reingold, South African swimmer and rugby player
- Jonas Reingold (born 1969), Swedish bass guitar player
- Louis Reingold (1874/75–1944), Yiddish playwright and journalist
- Omer Reingold, Israeli computer scientist
- Shirley Reingold, birth name of Deborah Chessler (1923–2012)
- Steven Reingold (born 1998), South African-born English cricketer
- Svetlana Reingold, Israeli museologist and curator

== First name ==
- Reingold Berzin (born 1888), Latvian teacher, later Latvian riflemen and Soviet military leader
- Reingold Gliere (born 1875), Ukrainian composer of German and Polish descent

== Other uses ==
- Nathan Reingold Prize

== See also ==
- Rheingold (disambiguation)
