= Rheingold (surname) =

Rheingold is a surname, meaning "gold of the Rhine river".

== Persons ==
- Arnold L. Rheingold, chemist
- Harriet Lange Rheingold, child development psychologist
- Howard Rheingold, media critic
- Joseph Rheingold, psychiatrist

== See also ==
- Reingold (disambiguation)
