= Arvin (name) =

Arvin is a male given name and a surname. Notable persons with the name include:

== Given name ==
- Arvin Amatorio (born 1971), Filipino-American attorney and politician
- Arvin Appiah (born 2001), English footballer of Ghanaian descent
- Arvin Arnold (1878–1941), American businessman and politician
- Arvin Babajee, Mauritian politician
- Arvin Boolell (born 1953), Mauritian politician
- Arvin Chen (born 1978), Taiwanese-American director and screenwriter
- Arvin Ghahremani (2004–2024), Iranian Jew executed by the Iranian government
- Arvin Moazzami (born 1990), Iranian cyclist
- Arvin Reingold (1930–2020), American lawyer and politician
- Arvin Slagter (born 1985), Dutch basketball player
- Arvin Tolentino (born 1995), Filipino professional basketball player

== Surname ==
- Ann Arvin (born 1945), American pediatrician and professor
- Bahare Arvin (born 1982), Iranian sociologist and reformist politician
- Mary Willie Arvin (1879–1947), American nurse and WWI veteran
- Newton Arvin (1900–1963), American literary critic, historian and academic
- Nick Arvin, American engineer and writer
- Reed Arvin, American record producer, keyboardist and author

== Fictional characters ==
- Arvin Russell, in the film The Devil All the Time
- Arvin Sloane, in the television series Alias

== See also ==
- MV Arvin, Ukrainian bulk cargo ship
- Arvind
- Arwind
- Arven (disambiguation)
- Erwin (disambiguation)
- Ervin (disambiguation)
