= Feldheim =

Feldheim may refer to:

== Places ==
- Feldheim, part of Treuenbrietzen, Brandenburg, Germany

== People ==
- Ervin Feldheim (1912–1944), Hungarian mathematician

== Organizations ==
- Feldheim Publishers, established in 1939 in New York City

== See also ==
- Feldheim Collection, philatelic collection of the British Library
