= Jiří Klůc =

Czech historian and researcher (born 1996)

- Born: 10 December 1996 (age 29); Karlovy Vary, Czech Republic
- Occupations: Historian, researcher
- Website: jirikluc.cz/en/

Jiří Klůc (born 10 December 1996) is a Czech historian and researcher. He has an active project to record the stories of the Holocaust and World War II survivors, having assembled more than 700 of them to date.

He has written a number of books, including the account of Ervín Hoida, who was the last surviving Czechoslovak veteran of the Battle of France, and Antonín Fajkus, the last living Czech fighter pilot from World War II.

== Career ==
Klůc says his interest in World War II survivors began as a teenager, volunteering to help Holocaust survivors living near his home in the Czech Republic. During the COVID-19 pandemic he realized that many of the survivors of World War II were passing away and that their stories were being lost. He began a project to interview and record the stories of concentration camp survivors and World War II veterans.

He is a graduate of Charles University in Prague, where he is also pursuing a Ph.D. His Masters Thesis was on the topic of Czechoslovak citizens who had German roots, but served in the British Royal Air Force to fight against the Nazis.

Klůc has traveled throughout Europe, North America, and Australia to record interviews. He has been supported through the Czech Heritage Foundation and through online donations to fund the project. In early 2025, he uncovered the story of Antonín Fajkus, a highly decorated Czechoslovak-born US World War II fighter pilot, traveling to Chicago to bring Fajkus more than 900 birthday cards for his 101st birthday, and greetings from the Czech president Petr Pavel.

As of early 2026 he has recorded more than 700 interviews with World War II survivors. Klůc stated that what surprised him most was that most of them had never told their story before. He says that he asks interviewees to relate not just their experiences of the war, but about daily life of the time and their heritage.

Klůc is an accredited guide at the Theresienstadt Ghetto (Terezín), a former Nazi transit/concentration camp and fortress town in World War II, located in the Protectorate of Bohemia and Moravia. He has also written a number of articles chronicling the stories of Czech fighters and survivors of World War II.

== Published Works ==
Klůc has published eight books, one of which is currently available in English.

- Sokolovo. In the Shadow of Propaganda. 2016. 256 pages. In Czech language. ISBN 978-80-87567-85-2.
- Kapitán Otakar Jaroš ("Captain Otakar Jaros"). The Story of a Hero of the Battle of Sokolovo. 2018. 176 pages. In Czech language. ISBN 978-80-7573-027-5.
- Josef Müller. The Story of a Czechoslovak Jewish Soldier on the Eastern Front. 2020. 160 pages. In Czech language. ISBN 978-80-88292-70-8.
- Stanislav Kobrle. The Forgotten Story of a Gulag Prisoner and Hero of the Eastern Front. 2022. 40 pages. In Czech language. ISBN 978-80-11-01277-9.
- Zapomenutí váleční veteráni ("Forgotten War Veterans"). Four previously unpublished stories of war veterans. 2022. 104 pages. In Czech language. ISBN 978-80-11-00967-0.
- Ervín Hoida: poslední z hrdinů ("Ervín Hoida: the Last of the Heroes"). Untold story of the Czechoslovak WWII veteran Ervin Hoida. 2023. 96 pages. Available in Czech and English. ISBN 978-80-7573-127-2.
- Čech od Rudých ďáblů ("A Czech Among the Red Devils"). The Story of the Last Living Czechoslovak Fighter Pilot Antonín Fajkus. 2025. 104 pages. In Czech language. ISBN 978-80-7573-148-7.
- S domovenkou Czechoslovakia ("With a shoulder patch Czechoslovakia"). The Story of the Czechoslovak Jewish Soldier in the RAF Jiří Švenger. 2026. 124 pages. In Czech language. ISBN 978-80-7573-161-6.

He has also published a number of online historical articles.

== Personal life ==
Klůc speaks Czech, Slovak, English and Russian. He lives in Prague.
