= Fajkus =

Fajkus is a surname. Notable people with the surname include:

- Antonín Fajkus (1923/1924–2025), Czechoslovak-born American World War II fighter pilot
- Charlie Fajkus (born 1957), American soccer player

== See also ==
- Csaba Fajkusz (born 1967), Hungarian gymnast
