= Arvind =

Aravind
- Gender: male
- Language: Hindi, Bengali, Odia

Origin
- Origin: Sanskrit
- Meaning: Lotus
- Region of origin: India

Aravind (from Sanskrit: अरविन्द aravinda) is a common Indian masculine name meaning lotus. The name is of Hindu origin. Its variants include Arvind, Aravinda, Aravindan, and Aurobindo (Bengali: অরবিন্দ).

== Meaning ==
Aravinda means lotus in the Sanskrit language. In particular, the word may refer to the lotus flower, on which the Hindu goddess of wealth and prosperity – Lakshmi – sits.

== Notable people ==
- Arvind Kejriwal, Indian politician and former bureaucrat
- Arvind Khanna, Indian politician and businessman
- Arvind Panagariya, Indian-American economist, professor of economics at Columbia University
- Arvind Pandey, Indian politician
- Arvind Mithal, known simply as Arvind, Indian-American professor of Computer Science and Engineering at MIT
- Arvind Parmar, British tennis player
- Arvind Sawant, Indian politician
- Arvind Sharma (born 1940), Indian academic
- Arvind Singh Mewar, Indian businessman, Maharana of Udaipur (Mewar)
- Arvind Swamy, Indian film actor
- Arvind Kumar (disambiguation), several people
- G Aravindan, Indian film director

Aravind

- Aravind Akash, Indian actor
- Aravind Adiga, Indian journalist and author
- Aravind L. Iyer, Indian evolutionary biologist
- Aravind Srinivas, Indo-American computer engineer and businessman, owner of Perplexity AI

Aravinda

- Aravinda de Silva, Sri Lankan cricketer
- Aravinda Akroyd Ghose, better known as Sri Aurobindo, Indian philosopher
- Aravinda Chakravarti, American geneticist

Other variants

- Arabinda Muduli, Indian Odia musician, singer and lyricist
- Arabinda Dhali, politician from Odisha
- Aravindan Neelakandan, Indian writer
- Aravindh Chithambaram, Indian chess grandmaster
- Sri Aurobindo, Indian nationalist, philosopher, yogi and poet from Bengal
- Aravindh (song), composed by Anirudh Ravichander
