= Rheingold =

Rheingold or Rhinegold may refer to:

== Arts ==
- Das Rheingold, an 1869 opera by Richard Wagner
- Rheingold (band), a German new wave band, part of the movement Neue Deutsche Welle
- Rheingold (Grave Digger album), a 2003 heavy metal recording
- Rheingold (Klaus Schulze album), a 2008 space music recording
- Rhine Gold (album), a 2012 album by Danish chamber pop band Choir of Young Believers
- Rhinegold (1978 film), by Niklaus Schilling
- Rhinegold (2022 film), a Fatih Akin film
- Rheingold, a treasure in the Nibelungenlied mythology
- A novel by Stephan Grundy
- Rheingold Theatre, a 1953–1957 American/UK TV series hosted by Douglas Fairbanks Jr.
- "The Rheingold", the seventh episode of the sixth season of the American fantasy television series Xena: Warrior Princess
- Ms. Rheingold, a Peter, Paul and Mary song from the album Reunion

== Other uses ==
- Rheingold (surname), and persons with the name
- Rheingold (train), an international express train in Europe
- Rheingold (horse) (1969–1990), animal
- Rheingold Beer, a brand of beverage
- Rheingold Brewery, a brewery that produced Rheingold brand beer
- Rheingold (typeface), a typeface designed by J. D. Trennert and Son
- Rhinegold Publishing, an independent publisher of music magazines, music yearbooks and education resources
- Rheingold, Texas, a community founded in 1859
