= Lipov =

- Municipality
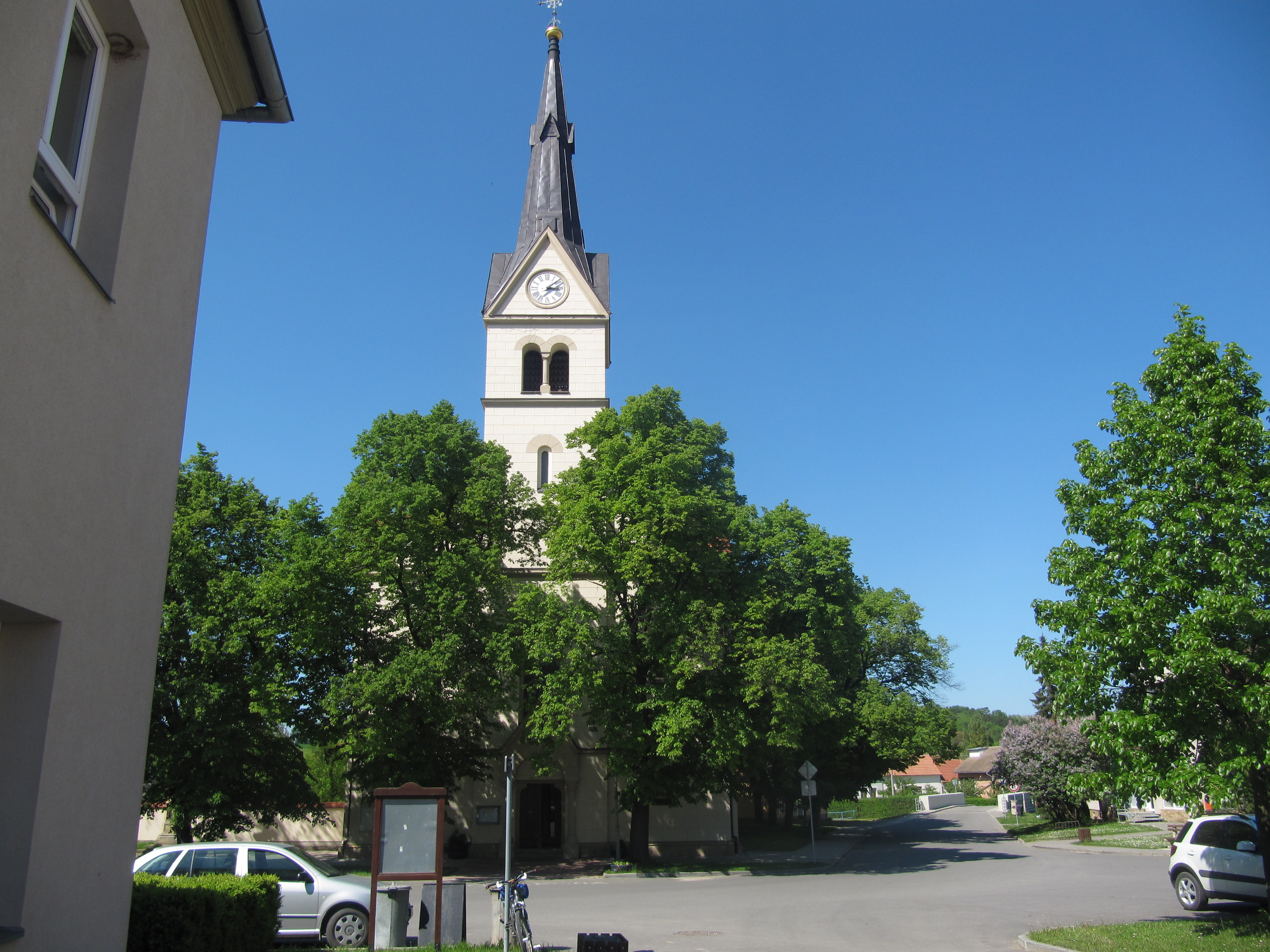
- Centre with Church of All Saints

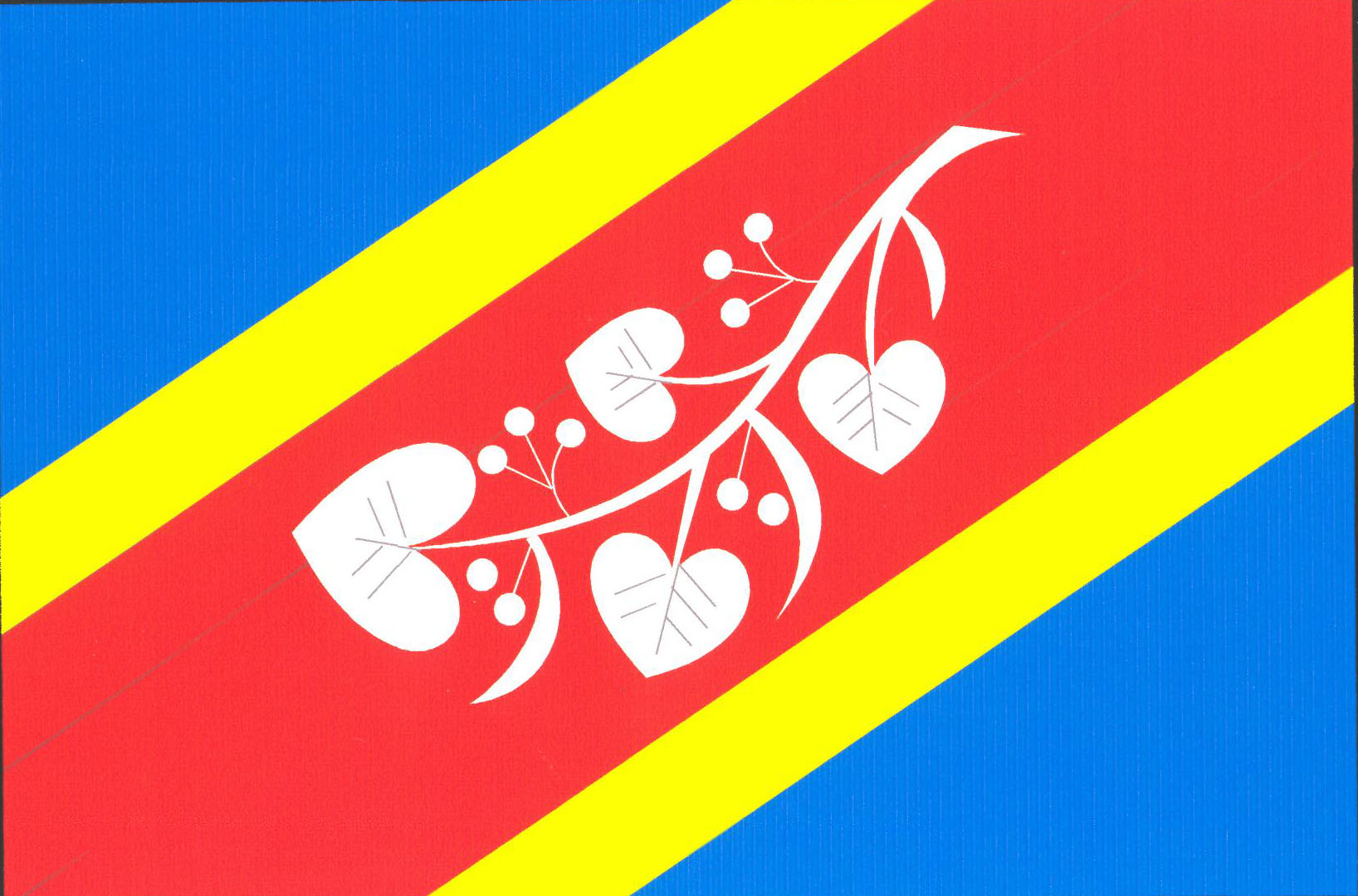
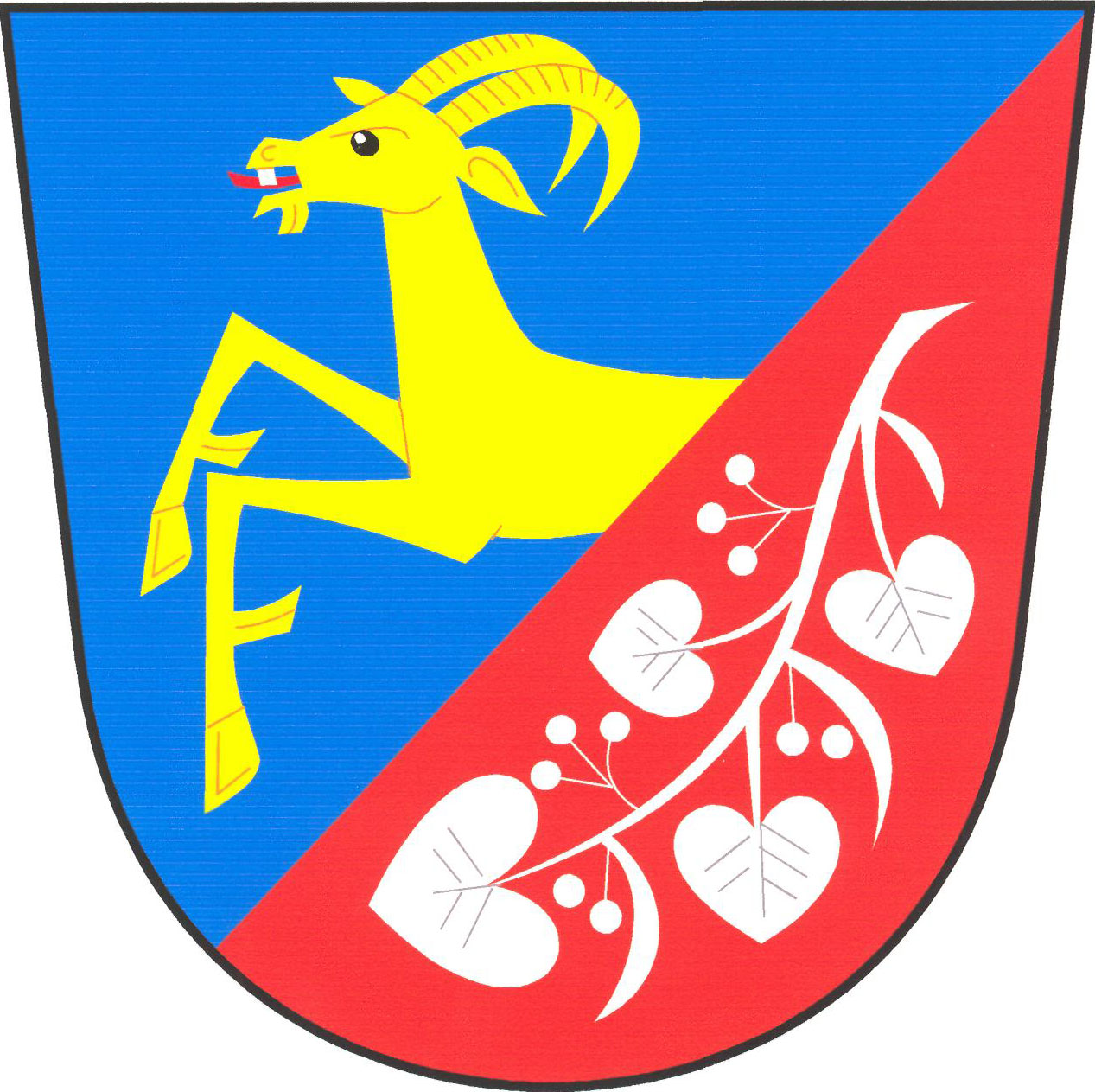
- Flag Coat of arms

- Location in the Czech Republic
- Coordinates: 48°54′18″N 17°27′42″E
- Country: Czech Republic
- Region: South Moravian
- District: Hodonín
- First mentioned: 1358

Area
  - Total: 15.16 km^{2} (5.85 sq mi)
- Elevation: 227 m (745 ft)

Population (2026-01-01)
  - Total: 1,394
  - Density: 91.95/km^{2} (238.2/sq mi)
- Time zone: UTC+1 (CET)
  - Summer (DST): UTC+2 (CEST)
- Postal code: 696 72
- Website: www.obeclipov.cz

Lipov (German: Lippau) is a municipality and village in Hodonín District in the South Moravian Region of the Czech Republic. It has about 1,400 inhabitants.

Lipov, a part of traditional ethnographic region Horňácko, lies approximately 26 kilometres (16 mi) east of Hodonín, 70 km (43 mi) south-east of Brno, and 257 km (160 mi) south-east of Prague.

== Demographics ==
Historical population
Year	Pop.	±%
1869	1,242	—
1880	1,344	+8.2%
1890	1,368	+1.8%
1900	1,500	+9.6%
1910	1,509	+0.6%
1921	1,473	−2.4%
1930	1,504	+2.1%
1950	1,462	−2.8%
1961	1,631	+11.6%
1970	1,613	−1.1%
1980	1,657	+2.7%
1991	1,563	−5.7%
2001	1,548	−1.0%
2011	1,476	−4.7%
2021	1,362	−7.7%
Source: Censuses

== Notable people ==
- Antonín Fajkus (1923–2025), American fighter pilot
