= Yakov Lidski =

Polish Jewish bookseller and publisher

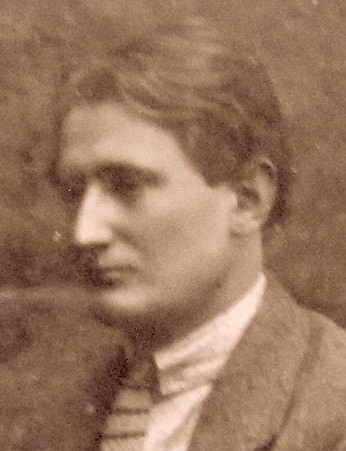
Lidski, c. 1910s

Yakov Lidski (or Yankev Lidski; Yiddish: יעקב לידסקי; 1868 in Slonim, Grodno Governorate, Russia – June 1, 1921 in Warsaw, Poland) was a Warsaw-based Jewish bookseller and publisher, pioneer of Yiddish literature publishing. Founder of “Progress” publishing house, which was the first to publish modern Yiddish literature, and co-founder and owner of the important publishing syndicate “Central.”

== Biography ==
=== The beginning of his book business: from Moscow to Chicago ===
Born in 1868 into a Lithuanian Jewish family in the Jewish town of Slonim, Grodno Governorate, Russia, Lidski attended the traditional Cheder and Yeshiva. His father, Kalman (HaCohen) Lidski, co-founded alongside Yitzchok Yakimowski the most important enterprise of sofer products (Torah scrolls, tefillin and mezuzot, and other religious writings) in Slonim, which was a center of this industry in Russia. They employed many sofrim, and distributed the company's products throughout Eastern Europe from their warehouse in Moscow. Lidski moved to Moscow after completing school, becoming his father's right hand and a talented publisher.

After the expulsion from Moscow (the 1891 forced relocation of Jews from Russia proper to the Pale of Settlement), his father's partnership fell apart. Conditions in Lidski’s hometown degraded severely during his time in Moscow, and many there had immigrated to the United States. Lidski first moved to Minsk, before taking up residence in Chicago, Illinois. Carrying on his father’s legacy, Lidski opened the highly profitable bookstore and publishing company named “J. Lidskin Co.” at 503 South Jefferson St. (for a time in no. 507), and became one of the first publishers of Yiddish books within the United States. These works included shund (popular) novels, sheet music and songs from the Yiddish theater, newspapers, and textbooks, all in Yiddish. During 1894 to 1895, he published collections of song lyrics without notes edited by songwriter Isaac Reingold; with Yiddish parodies he wrote, humorising popular American songs. Lidski used his industry knowledge to help Jewish immigrants open small stores and supplied them with newspapers sourced from Chicago and New York City, further boosting Yiddish culture. In addition, he was appointed treasurer of the Yiddish Society of Classic Literature (Klaisher Literatur Farein) in Chicago.

=== Warsaw: Nalewki Street Bookstore and "Progress" Publishing House ===
In 1899 Lidski returned to Russia, equipped with a substantial sum of 2,000 rubles and matrices of Yiddish books published in America, and settled in Warsaw, Russian Poland, as the Russian representative of the American Jewish publishers in the Polish and Russian markets. At the same time he helped radicals smuggle forbidden literature into the Russian Empire. In addition, he acquired from Abraham Kotik – a pioneer of the Jewish socialist movement, one of the first Yiddishists (advocates of Yiddish) and one of the first to develop popular Yiddish literature and bring the Jewish intelligentsia closer to Yiddish (also, Yechezkel Kotik's son) – his publishing house. The enterprise, founded in 1894 in collaboration with Alter Bresler, published a series of Yiddish popular science books called "Visenshaftlikhe folks-bikher" (popular scientific books).

In 1900, Lidski founded "Progress" publishing house. Its name clearly communicated its goal. This publishing company, considered to be the first to deal with modern Yiddish literature, published a series of original and translated popular science books, along with translated European literature and original Yiddish literature. The first editor of the publishing house was poet Avrom Reyzen. Many of the books published in the beginning were reprints of books previously published in the United States or by Kotik, among which is the first book in the series "Visenshaftlikhe folks-bikher", Vi Haben Menshen Gelebt mit Einige Toizend Yor Tzurik? ("How People Lived Thousands of Years Ago?") by Boris Pavlovich, translated by Kotik and Bressler, and Yosef Perl: Zayne Literarishe un Allgemayne Arbeit ("Joseph Perl: His Literary and General Work") by Bresler.

The first book to be published, in 1901, was Shteiner Vos Falen fun Himel ("Stones Falling From the Sky") – a popular explanation of meteorites, shooting stars and comets, by the socialist, popularizer of science, and anti-religious fighter Benjamin Feigenbaum. The house editor, Avrom Reyzen, later wrote that "the crowds were so thirsty for science then; they devoured Stones Falling From the Sky like the starving Jews in the desert devoured the manna, which once fell like stones from heaven!". The three books that appeared next were Die Menshlikhe Entviklung: Kultur Geshikhte ("Human Development: Cultural History) by Friedrich Streissler, loosely translated (and adapted) by Alter Bressler (who published several other books at Progress, such as a popular, abbreviated edition of Henry Thomas Buckle's Di Geshikhte fun Tsivilizatsien in England ("History of Civilization in England) made by Notovich); a translation of Vladimir Korolenko's "The Blind Musician" (Der Blinder Musikant) (anonymous translator); and Darvinismus, oder, Darvin Had Getrofen ("Darwinism, or what Darwin discovered) by Feigenbaum.

In addition to these, Progress published original Yiddish fiction – the complete works of Y.L. Peretz and Sholem Aleichem, Sholem Asch, Yona Rosenfeld, David Pinsky, David Frishman and Mordecai Spector, works by Peretz Hirshbein, Der Nister, Chaim Nachman Bialik and others, among which was Avrom Reyzen's first collection of poems (Tsayt Lider, 1902), who, in addition to being the publishing house editor, was its main author in its first years.

Lidski's bookstore on Nalewki street, the center of Jewish life in Warsaw, offered a large selection of Yiddish books of various kinds: popular science, fiction, language-learning books, plays, sheet music of Jewish music, folk songs, photo albums and other Yiddish printed matter: pictures, postcards, and greeting cards. Lidski Imported American- and British-made Yiddish books of various types: fiction and non-fiction, textbooks and sheet music. Apart from numerous American-made fiction books, including many Yiddish adaptations of world literature, Lidski allowed for the Jews of Eastern Europe – more than 1,200,000 of whom were to immigrate to the United States in the years 1904 to 1914 alone – to gain knowledge about America, using a wide selection of books: the store sold Yiddish publications about the history of the United States, the U.S. Constitution and key personalities and events in American history, novels of American life and its Jewish immigrants, and books and dictionaries for learning English by Alexander Harkavy. Being close to radical circles, Lidski continued helping Jewish revolutionaries import socialist literature.

Thanks to his agility and entrepreneurship, the publishing gradually evolved and expanded – especially in the years following the revolution of 1905, along with the general increase in demand for books in Yiddish from a broad readership. Progress flourished thanks to the good quality and wide selection of books offered, and it shortly became the leading Jewish publishing house in the Russian Empire. Competition emerged soon after, and by 1911 there were ten publishing houses operating in Warsaw. In addition to books, Progress published magazines and yearbooks. The literary magazine Eyropeishe Literatur ("European literature"), edited by Avrom Reyzen, which began appearing in January 1910 and continued as a weekly magazine, specialized in high literary works translated from various European languages. With the decline of the magazine, Reyzen included in it also original Yiddish works of modern writers; but publication was discontinued after the 39th issue. The Yearbook Lidskis Familien Kalendar ("Lidski's Family Calendar"; in the second year was renamed Lidskis Fֿamilien Almanakh, "Lidski's Family Yearbook"), which appeared in the years 1908-9 and 1909–10, suggesting that "scientific and literary articles, poems, stories, biographies, jokes, anecdotes, important statistics and useful information needed in every home and family" (in the second year he also published Lidski's Ilustrirter un Literarisher Tashen-Kalendar, "Lidski's Illustrated and Literary Pocket and Calendar"). Other publications were Yor-Bukh "Progress" ("'Progress' Yearbook" for literature, science and criticism, 1904), Dos Yidishe Vort ("The Jewish Word", for literature, science, criticism and social life, Cracow, 1905), Kunst un Leben ("Art and Life", for literature, science, criticism and art, 1908), Dos Yor ("The Year", literary anthology, Warsaw and New York, 1910) and the anthology Fraye Erd ("Free Land", Warsaw and New York, 1911), all edited by Reyzen; the anthology of literary criticism Der Yunger Gayst ("The Youthful Spirit"), edited by Noach Pryłucki (1909), the literary anthology Yudish edited by Y.L. Peretz (1910) and special booklets for the holidays.

In 1910, towards the 75th anniversary of Mendele Mocher Sforim, Lidski and the Vilnius publisher Shlomo Sreberk purchased the printing rights for the complete works of Mendele (at first with Mendele's son-in-law, who later withdrew) and founded Mendele Publishing, dedicated to the publishing of his complete body of works in Yiddish and other languages.

In the same year Mordecai Kaplan's small publishing house “HaShakhar” (השחר, 'Dawn'; established in 1908) merged into Lidski's Progress.

=== Partner in the publishing syndicate "Central" ===
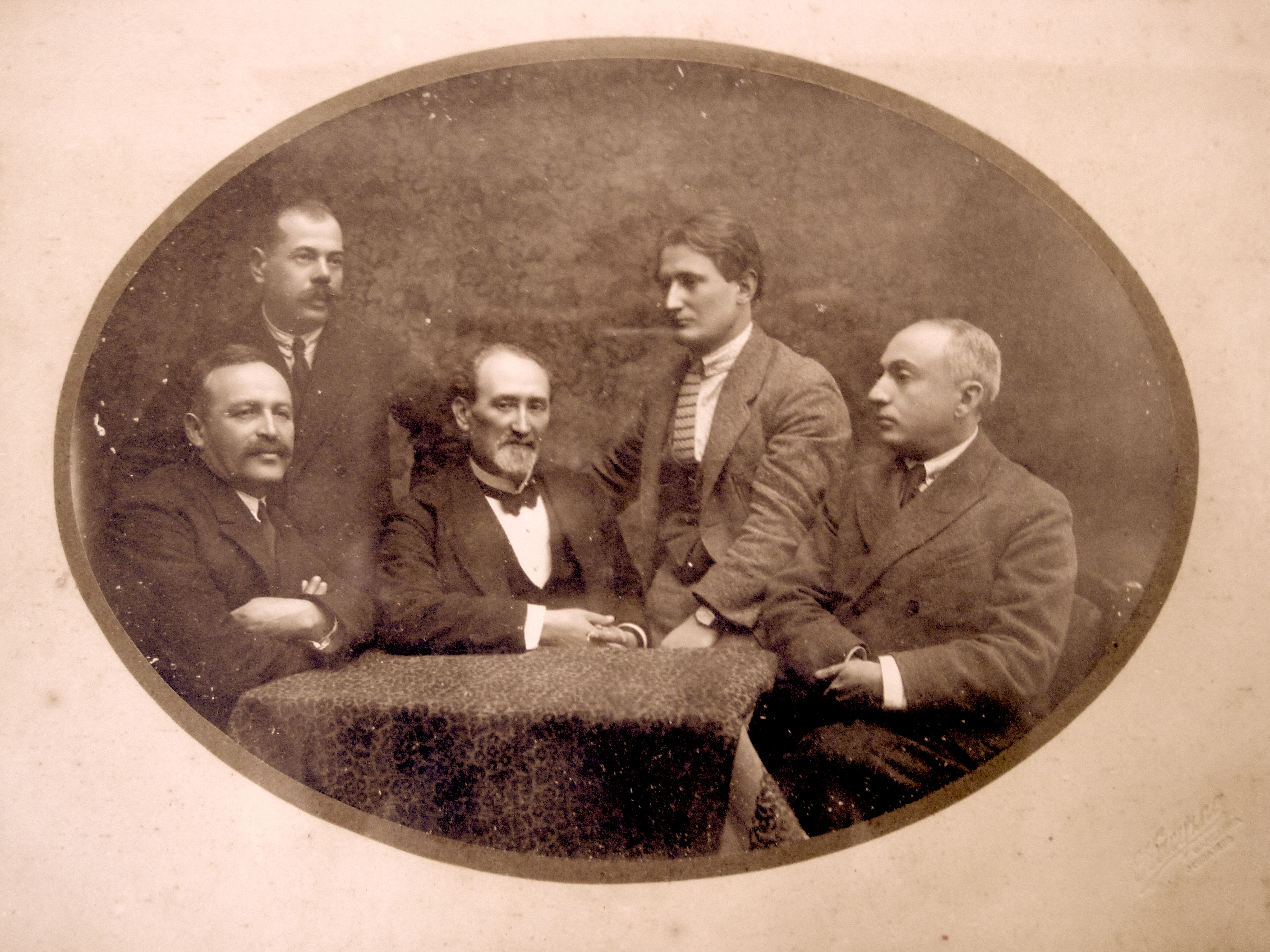
Yakov Lidski (standing second to the right) among the five co-founders and owners of "Central"; to his right is Benjamin Szymin, and to his left are Ben Avigdor (A.L. Shalkovich), Mordechai Kaplan and Shlomo Sreberk

In 1911 the cooperation between Lidski, Sreberk and Kaplan raised a notch, giving rise to the publishing syndicate "Central" (צענטראל, Tsentral; also named in Hebrew: מרכז, “Merkaz”), which united some of the largest Yiddish and Hebrew publishers in the Russian Empire. In addition to Lidski's "Progress", Kaplan's "HaShakhar" and Sreberk's "S. Sreberk" (ש. שרעבערק) the publishing house incorporated Ben Avigdor's (A.L. Shalkovich) Hebrew publishing company “Tushiya” (תושיה) and Benjamin Szymin's "B. Szymin" (ב. שימין) (all five partners were Lithuanian Jews and all but Sreberk were Warsaw residents). The Yiddish department in Central was led mainly by Lidski, whose editor was the writer David Kassel. The Hebrew department was directed by Ben Avigdor.

The unified publishing company, situated on 7 Nowolipki St., published works of the greatest Yiddish and Hebrew writers, historians and pedagogues, as well as a series of children's books, a series of books for young adults and textbooks and readers. Central was the first Jewish publishing house to establish ties with Jewish communities outside of Russia (including the U.S.) and disseminate its books worldwide. Apart from books, it published various printed matter, such as a calendar depicting paintings of biblical scenes and photographs of the Land of Israel and famous figures etc., which was popular throughout the Jewish world for more than a quarter century, and Passover Haggadot and artistic Shana tova (Happy New Year) greeting cards, which enjoyed success.

In 1912 Central's subsidiary Ahisefer, a Hebrew publishing house, was founded, with the initiative of Tushiya owners Ben-Avigdor and Jacob Ramberg. In the same year Ahisefer released the literary collection Netivot ('Paths'; "Free Stage for Matters of Life and Literature"). At the beginning of the year 1914, Central took under its wings the issuance of the common Yiddish daily Der fraynd (also called Dos Leben) in Warsaw. With the outbreak of World War I the company's operations ceased (it reorganized in 1923, and operated until the mid 1930s).

=== Final years ===
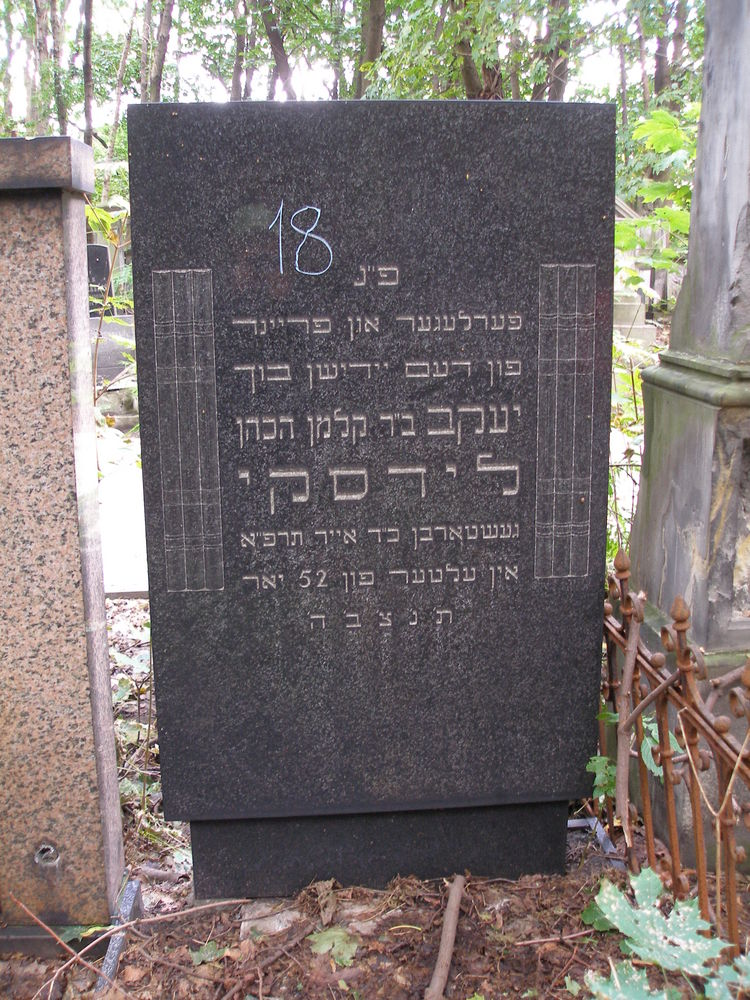
Yakov Lidski's grave at the Okopowa Street Jewish Cemetery in Warsaw (the inscription: ferleger un fraynd fun dem yidishn bukh – "Publisher and Friend to the Jewish Book"

From the establishment of the association, Lidski's publishing endeavors were done through Central, but the company discontinued operations at the outbreak of the First World War in the summer of 1914. In 1915, during the German occupation, Lidski founded a new independent publishing house named Yudish (sometimes written Yidish), which soon became the most active Yiddish publisher in Warsaw. The Yudish publishing house operated until 1920, and published several dozen major works, mainly translated fiction: Rousseau's Confessions, Tolstoy's Childhood (both translated by Kassel), stories by Mark Twain, Guy de Maupassant's Strong as Death, One Thousand and One Nights (translated by H. D. Nomberg), Memoirs and Articles by Vladimir Medem, Vladimir Korolenko's Tales of Cyberia and more. In addition to these, it published original and translated nonfiction books, and in 1920 it released the dramatic collection Di Eyropeishe Bine ("European Stage"), edited by Zalmen Zylbercweig, which offered a selection of European plays (dramas, comedies, and farces) translated into Yiddish.

After the war, around the year 1919 (according to another version, in 1918), Lidski purchased with Ben-Avigdor and his partners Kh. Berman and A. Kagan the big, old Vilnius printing and publishing house Rosenkranz and Shriftsetzer (ראָזענקראנץ און שריפטזעצער; established 1863).

While in Vilnius in the summer of 1921 for handling the business of his new purchase, Lidski fell ill and died suddenly on June 1, at 52 years old. His body was brought to Warsaw and was buried in the Warsaw Jewish cemetery at a funeral with numerous participants. On his tombstone was engraved the inscription: "Ferleger un freynd fun dem Yidishn Bukh" ("publisher and friend of the Jewish book"), and on both sides of it are carved images of book spines. He left behind his wife and daughter Alia. In his will he left a considerable amount to charity, and ordered to provide all the writers whose books were published by Yudish the stereotypes (the plates used for printing) of their books.

Lidski's widow, Reytze Lidski (Lidska) née Hurwitz, died in the city of Otwock near Warsaw in December 1936 at the age of 65, after a long and serious illness, and was buried there. At her death she left her daughter and son-in-law. The brother of Lidski's wife, Samuel Leib Hurwitz (known under the pen name “S. Litvin”; 1862–1943), was a socialist activist and a writer, one of the pioneers of Poale Zion, folklorist, publicist, and editor in Russia and the United States.
