= Arven =

Arven may refer to:

- Arven (1979 film), a Norwegian film
- Arven (2003 film), a Danish film
- Arven (band), a German metal band
- Arven Pharmaceuticals, a Turkish Pharmaceutical company
- Arven (Pokémon), a character from Pokémon Scarlet and Violet
