= Arvind Kumar =

Arvind Kumar may refer to:

- Arvind Kumar (academic) (born 1943), Indian physicist and educationist
- Arvind Kumar (surgeon) (born 1958), Indian surgeon
- Arvind Kumar (police officer), IPS officer
- Arvind Kumar (lexicographer), Indian lexicographer and journalist
