= Antonín Fajkus =

American World War II fighter pilot (1923–2025)

- Born: 4 December 1923; Lipov, Czechoslovakia
- Died: 5 February 2025 (aged 101)
- Allegiance: United States
- Service years: 1943–1945

Antonín Fajkus, also known as Anthony Faikus Jr (4 December 1923 – 5 February 2025), was an American World War II fighter pilot. He was born in Lipov in Czechoslovakia. His family immigrated in the 1930s to Chicago, where a notable Czech minority settled. During World War II, he served as a volunteer in the American army serving in the 40th Fighter Squadron, known as the "Red Devils,". He fought against the Japanese in the Pacific completing 190 operational flights, totaling over 500 combat hours, and was awarded the U.S. Air Medal six times. Eventually in the 1940s, he obtained American citizenship.

Historian Jiří Klůc uncovered Fajkus's story, leading to a surge of recognition, including over 900 birthday cards for his 101st birthday, with greetings from Czech president Petr Pavel and his wife. In his old age, he stayed at an Illinois Veterans Home, Manteno, Kankakee County. He died on 5 February 2025, at the age of 101.
