= Arvind Kumar (lexicographer) =

Indian journalist, art-drama-film critic, short story writer, translator, lexicographer

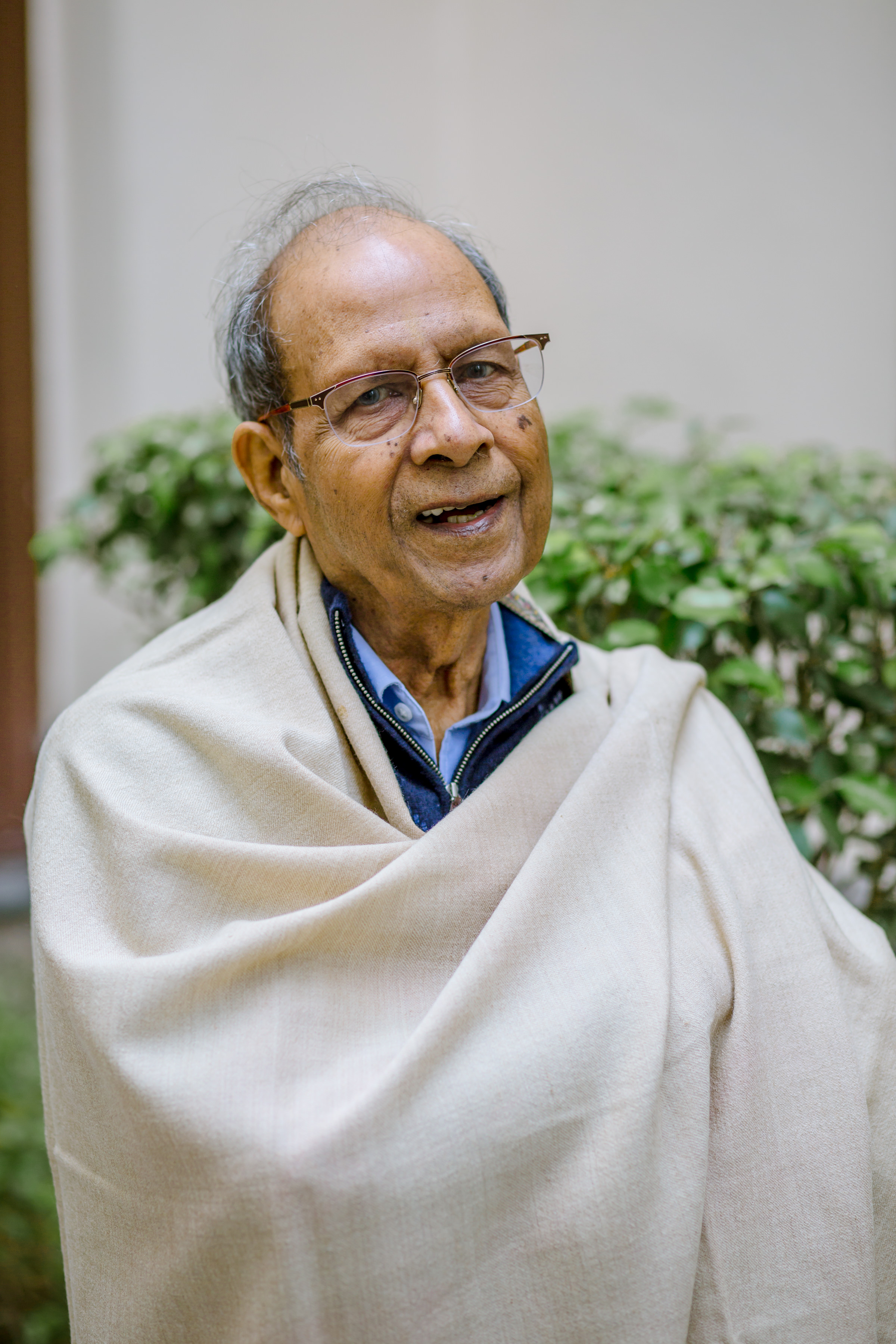
- Born: 17 January 1930; Meerut, Uttar Pradesh, India
- Died: 26 April 2021 (aged 91); New Delhi, India
- Occupations: Journalist; art-drama-film critic; short story writer; translator; lexicographer
- Years active: 1945–2021
- Notable work: Samantar Kosh (1996); The Penguin English-Hindi/Hindi-English Dictionary and Thesaurus (2007)
- Spouse: Kusum Kumar
- Children: 2

Arvind Kumar (17 January 1930 – 26 April 2021) was an Indian journalist, art-drama-film critic, short story writer, translator, and lexicographer.

He has authored Samantar Kosh (published by National Book Trust in 1996), the first-ever thesaurus in Hindi or any modern Indian language as well as a three volume bilingual thesaurus and dictionary, The Penguin English-Hindi/Hindi-English Thesaurus & Dictionary (published by Penguin India in 2007) which has 2,823,630 English and Hindi words.

He digitized his works on Arvind Lexicon, a database published online in 2011 and accessible via subscription. This database is a repository of one million expressions in English and Hindi.

Prior to publishing his lexicographical works, Arvind worked as Executive Editor of Delhi Press group magazines Sarita, Mukta and Caravan (1953-1963), Founder-Editor of The Times of India group’s Hindi film magazine Madhuri (1963-1978), and Founder-Editor of the Hindi edition of The Reader’s Digest, Sarvottam (1980-1985)

His autobiography, ShabdVedh, was published in 2016 and released at the Jaipur Literature Festival.

A documentary film based on Arvind's life and lexical works, Thesaurus Man - Arvind Kumar, was released on YouTube on April 26, 2023.

== Early life and career ==
Arvind Kumar was born in Meerut, Uttar Pradesh on 17 January 1930.

Arvind began his education in the local municipality school, and then Vaishya school, where he studied till class VIII. When dire economic circumstances compelled the family to move to Delhi, he completed Matriculation in Khalsa High School in Karol Bagh’s Gurudwara, obtaining distinction in four subjects. Despite being offered a scholarship, household circumstances did not permit him to study further, and at the age of 15, he began to work in Delhi Press, as an assistant to the compositor in the printing press.

Over the next ten years, he worked in almost every department of the press as a compositor, machine man, binder, block maker, cashier, typist and proofreader and completed his BA (1953) and MA English (1955) from Panjab University. By 1955, Arvind had become Executive Editor for Hindi, English and Urdu magazines published by Delhi Press group including Sarita (magazine), Mukta and The Caravan.

Often in translating stories from Hindi to English, it would be difficult for Arvind to find the correct words and it was during these days that a friend introduced Arvind to Roget’s Thesaurus; he could not find an equivalent lexicographical work in Hindi.

Arvind then moved to Mumbai to launch Madhuri, The Times of India Group’s new Hindi film magazine (1963-1978). Madhuri's goal was to avoid gossip content and to teach its readers to appreciate every aspect of film making, as well as world cinema and regional cinema.

Arvind also launched Sarvottam, the Hindi edition of the international magazine Reader’s Digest, from Delhi (1980-1985).

== Lexicography ==
He resigned from Madhuri in 1978 to fulfil his dream of making a thesaurus in Hindi and spent 20 years researching, authoring and compiling the first-ever thesaurus in Hindi Samantar Kosh which was published by the National Book Trust India in 1996.

Arvind with his wife Kusum presented the first copy of Samantar Kosh to the President of India, Dr Shankar Dayal Sharma on 13 December 1996. Published in India’s Golden Jubilee year of Independence, Samantar Kosh has been reprinted six times and has sold more than 20,000 copies. The Hindu described Samantar Kosh as "vastly inclusive, user friendly and a golden dot on Hindi’s forehead."

After the release of Samantar Kosh, Arvind then began work on developing a bilingual thesaurus to link Hindi with English. And eleven years later, the three-volume Penguin English-Hindi/Hindi-English Thesaurus & Dictionary with five and a half lakh expressions was published by Penguin India in 2007. This Work is 3,154 pages long, the three volumes weigh 5 kg and are a home for 500,000 expressions.

In addition to these two works, Arvind has compiled Arvind Sahaj Samantar Kosh, the first alphabetical Hindi thesaurus; Shabdeshwari, a thesaurus of Indian mythological names – the first-ever in any language; Brihat Samantar Kosh, a revised and extended edition of Samantar Kosh; Arvind Word Power: English-Hindi, a ready reference alphabetical dictionary, thesaurus and mini-encyclopedia, and Arvind Tukant Kosh, a book of 57,000 rhyming words.

All of Arvind’s lexicographical can be found in his web-based database, Arvind Lexicon, comprising a total of 1,012,754 Hindi and English expressions and words.

== Published works ==
=== Lexical works by Arvind Kumar (in order of publication) ===
- Samantar Kosh: thesaurus of Hindi words and expressions, published by National Book Trust 1996
- Shabdeshwari: thesaurus of Indian mythological names, published by Rajkamal Prakashan 1999
- Arvind Sahaj Samantar Kosh]: alphabetical thesaurus in Hindi, published by Rajkamal Prakashan 2005
- The Penguin English-Hindi/Hindi-English Thesaurus and Dictionary: bilingual thesaurus and dictionary in Hindi and English, published by Penguin India 2007; Arvind Linguistics LLP 2011
- Brihat Samantar Kosh: Comprehensive India-centric International Hindi Thesaurus, published by National Book Trust 2013
- Arvind Word Power: English-Hindi: An alphabetical dictionary cum thesaurus, published by Arvind Linguistics LLP 2015
- Arvind Tukant Kosh: A pocketbook of 57,000 rhyming words, published by Arvind Linguistics LLP 2015
- Arvind Lexicon Online: a bilingual Hindi-English-Hindi thesaurus, with a choice of using Hindi in Roman script (for those who can’t read or type Hindi)

=== Other works by Arvind Kumar (in order of publication) ===
- Vikram Saindhav: A Hindi verse adaptation of Julius Caesar set in the background of Indus Valley civilization. Published by National School of Drama 1998
- English-Hindi Julius Caesar: A Hindi verse translation juxtaposed with William Shakespeare’s original text. Published by Radhakrishna Prakashan 2000
- Sahaj Geeta: A Hindi prose translation of the Shrimad Bhagwad Geeta. Published by Radhakrishna Prakashan 2000
- Faust Ek Traasadi: A Hindi verse translation from Johann Wolfgang von Goethe’s original. Published by Bhartiya Jnanpith 2002
- ShabdVedh: An autobiography of Arvind Kumar. Published by Arvind Linguistics LLP 2016

== Personal life ==
In 1959, Arvind married Kusum. They had two children together, Dr Sumeet Kumar and Meeta Lall. Kusum is a co-author for many of Arvind's lexicographic works. Meeta is the CEO of Arvind’s publishing company, Arvind Linguistics, that publishes all his lexicographical works.

Sumeet, in the early 1990s, realized the importance of computerizing Arvind’s fast-expanding database for Samantar Kosh. Sumeet organized funds for buying a personal computer and then, wrote the software for computerizing the cards, sorting them and creating print-ready pages of Samantar Kosh. He has written the computer applications for all of Arvind’s lexicographical works and has created the software for the web-based Arvind Lexicon.

== Death ==
On 26 April 2021, Arvind died of COVID-19 complications in New Delhi.

== Honours and awards ==
- Hindi Ratna Samaan (Hindi Bhavan) 2018
- Vishwa Hindi Samman (10th Vishwa Hindi Sammelan) 2015
- Parampara Vishisht Rituraj Samman (Sahitya Sanstha Parampara) 2015
- Shalaka Samman (Hindi Academy, Delhi) 2011
- Rashtrabhasha Gaurav Samman (Sansadiya Hindi Parishad) 2006
- Subramanya Bharti Award (Kendriya Hindi Sansthan) 1999
- Dr Hardev Bahri Samman (Hindi Sahitya Sammelan) 1999
- Akhil Bharti Hindi Seva Puraskar (Hindi Academy, Maharashtra) 1998
