= Louis Reingold =

Louis David Reingold (1874 or 1875–1944) was a Yiddish playwright and journalist.

== Early life ==
Louis David Reingold was born Eliezer Dovid Ozharov in Ciechanów, Poland, in 1874 or 1875.

He was descended from local pedigree. On his mother's side, he was a grandchild of the "rosh ha-kool" (head of the Jewish community) and on his father's side, a grandchild of a Jewish advisor of Alexander the Second, who was shot during the Polish uprising in 1863. Reingold's father was a rabbi in Sierpc, about 80 km from Ciechanow. Reingold studied in kheyder, where his father let him learn more Bible than Talmud, and studied Russian and Polish privately. Later, he attended public school, which caused an uproar, because the rabbi's son was studying without a hat.

== Coming to America ==
Reingold's father was invited to work as a rabbi in New York, but only became a rabbi for a small group of landslayt (Jews from the same Eastern European town). In 1899, his father brought him and a younger sister to New York, where he became a tailor and attended a night school. According to Reingold's grandson, the family changed their last name from Ozharov because it was too difficult to pronounce and spell in America. Reingold became active in the Jewish labor movement, serving as a secretary and executive member of the Tailor's Union, and organized a branch of women workers in 1893. In 1896 or 1897, he joined the Socialist Worker's Party, became district secretary, and he was for a time employed by them. In 1897, he married Esther Friedman, whom he met through labor organizing. They had four children: Gussie, Bessie, Flora, and Joseph, who later changed the spelling of his last name to Rheingold. Louis Reingold worked in the garment industry in Rochester, NY, for a short time, then came back again to New York. After living briefly in St. Louis, he settled in Chicago, where he worked as a playwright, journalist, theater critic, and editor, and was also active as a speaker and organizer for various charity groups.

== Journalism ==
Beginning in 1899, Reingold wrote sketches about working people's lives for the Nyu Yorker Yudishe folkstsaytung. He worked briefly as a labor reporter for the Forverts (Jewish Daily Forward) for a month, then as a business agent in the children's suit union, and wrote in 1902 for the Brownsville weekly newspaper Hoyz fraynd. Unable to earn a living, he became a prompter in a Yiddish vaudeville theatre in Metropolitan Music Hall. In 1908, he worked as a writer and editor for the St. Louis daily newspaper, Forshteyer, then went to Chicago, where he worked as a writer of skits and short stories, theater critic, and editor at local newspapers including Di teglikhe velt, Der yidisher rekord/The Jewish Record and Idishe arbayter velt.

== Reingold's Yiddish plays ==
Reingold's Yiddish plays were produced in various cities in the United States and Canada, especially New York, Chicago, and Detroit. Unpublished manuscripts for many of his works are found in the Dorot Jewish Division of the New York Public Library, and in the Library of Congress.

According to Rejzen, Reingold joined a Yiddish dramatic club in 1895 and wrote two one-act plays for them. On December 5, 1902, his play Hirsh Lekert was performed by a dramatic theater club for a benefit of the Bund in Brownsville, Brooklyn, where he was an executive member. He also wrote for the Yiddish Theatre Company. He read a play called The Freedom Fighter for Yiddish actress Bertha Kalich and her husband, theater manager Leopold Spachner, and they asked him to write another play. This work, titled Zindike neshomes, was apparently lost by Kalich and Spachner, but later performed by Kalich with Morris Moshkovitsh on March 5, 1917, at Gertner's Pavilion Theatre in Chicago. In 1925, Reingold sent a similar play, Neshome, to the Library of Congress for copyright registration. Reingold also gave his play Di naye velt (also known as Di farkerte velt) to Jacob P. Adler, who took it without paying Reingold and produced it at the Grand Theatre in 1919 - according to Reingold, Adler did this under the name Two generations and credited another playwright, Z. Libin. Reingold's play, Dos milkhome kind, was produced at the Empire Theatre in Chicago in 1918 by Misha and Lucy German, and also performed by [Leon?] Blank in Cleveland and by Jacob Kalich and Dina Feinman in Boston. According to Kalmen Marmor, Reingold's plays Idisher velt khurbn (Jewish world destruction) and Tekhter fun Ukraine (daughters of Ukraine) were produced in 1919. Reingold's play Sha, sha, der rebe geyt was produced at Elving's Metropolitan Theatre in Newark, NJ in 1924; and also in New York City, Chicago and Detroit. Tsurisene hertser (also known as Forgotten children) was produced at the Lyric Theatre in Brooklyn, NY in 1924, and as a benefit at the Littman's People's Theatre in Detroit in the 1924–25 season. At least three other plays by Reingold were performed at Littman's: The Only Sister/Ir eyntsike shvester (four-performances in the 1926–27 season); Libes flamen (three performances in the 1931–32 season), and The Rabbi's Daughter, which lists Samuel H. Cohen as a co-author (two performances in the 1935–36 season).

Many of Reingold's plays and skits were performed in Chicago, where he worked as a publicist for the Logan Square Theatre. These works include Di tekhter fun ukraine (1918–1919, Empire Theatre), Libe un flikht (March 1926, Yidisher yugend edukeyshonal klob), Der strayker (April 1926, venue unknown), Soydes fun Shikago/Secrets of Chicago (Lawndale Theatre, date unknown), and Der Idisher tsigayner. Programs, and newspaper articles for many of these works are found in a scrapbook in the Louis Reingold Collection, Dorot Jewish Division, New York Public Library. Reingold also authored a number of works for which performance information is unknown.

== Controversy ==
On December 5, 1924, the Rosa Zilbert Theatre (later the Hopkinson Theatre) in Brownsville, Brooklyn, produced Reingold's play A grus fun der heym, with music by H. Zalik. Later on, Boris Thomashefsky performed the same play in Toronto under the name Fargesene froyen. Reingold claimed that Thomashefsky's 1927 operetta Bar Mitsve was a plagiarized version of Reingold's A grus fun der heym/Fargesene froyen, and initiated legal proceedings against Thomashefsky. Reingold's scrapbook in the Louis Reingold Collection includes newspaper coverage on this subject.

== Later life ==
In his last years, Reingold was employed as a publicity and organizational manager in the office of the American Jewish Congress in Chicago, where he died on August 27, 1944. He is buried with his wife Esther in the Pruzhnitzer section of Waldheim Cemetery in Chicago.

Reingold's archive, known as the Louis Reingold Collection, was donated to the Dorot Jewish Division of the New York Public Library by his descendants. The collection includes unpublished manuscripts and typescripts for many of his works as well a scrapbook of newspaper clippings, photographs, and Reingold's unpublished autobiography in Yiddish original and English translation.
