= Ervin Memetov =

Ukrainian footballer

Personal information
- Full name: Ervin Ildarovych Memetov
- Date of birth: 7 February 1990 (age 36)
- Place of birth: Shahrisabz, Uzbek SSR, Soviet Union
- Height: 1.76 m (5 ft 9 1/2 in)
- Position: Midfielder

Team information
- Current team: PFC Sevastopol

Senior career*
Years	Team	Apps	(Gls)
2007	FC Enerhiya Yuzhnoukrainsk	15	(0)
2006–2008	PFC Sevastopol	46	(5)
2008–	→PFC Sevastopol-2	15	(0)
- * Club domestic league appearances and goals

Ervin Memetov (Ukrainian: Ервін Ільдарович Меметов) born 7 February 1990), is a Ukrainian footballer, currently playing for PFC Sevastopol-2.
