= Ervin Fowlkes =

Professional baseball player

- Shortstop
- Born: January 18, 1922; Lake Charles, Louisiana, U.S.
- Died: December 3, 1994 (aged 72); Kansas City, Missouri, U.S.
- Batted: Right Threw: Right

Negro league baseball debut
- 1948, for the Homestead Grays

Last appearance
- 1948, for the Homestead Grays
- Stats at Baseball Reference

Teams
- Homestead Grays (1948)

Ervin Fowlkes (January 18, 1922 – December 3, 1994) was an American professional baseball shortstop in the Negro leagues. He played with the Homestead Grays in 1948.

== Early life ==
Fowlkes was born on January 18, 1922, in Lake Charles, Louisiana, the son of Richard and Rosa Fowlkes. He served in the United States Army from 1942 to 1945 during World War II.

== Baseball career ==
Ervin and his brother, Samuel, both played for the Boston Blues of the United States League in 1946 before the team and league disbanded. By May 1947, he was a member of the barnstorming Detroit Senators, and appeared in games through the remainder of their season.

In 1948, Fowlkes joined the Homestead Grays, who would go on to win the 1948 Negro World Series. In available statistics, Fowlkes appeared in at least 16 games, and recorded five hits in 47 at bats.
