= Isaac Reingold =

American poet (1873-1903)

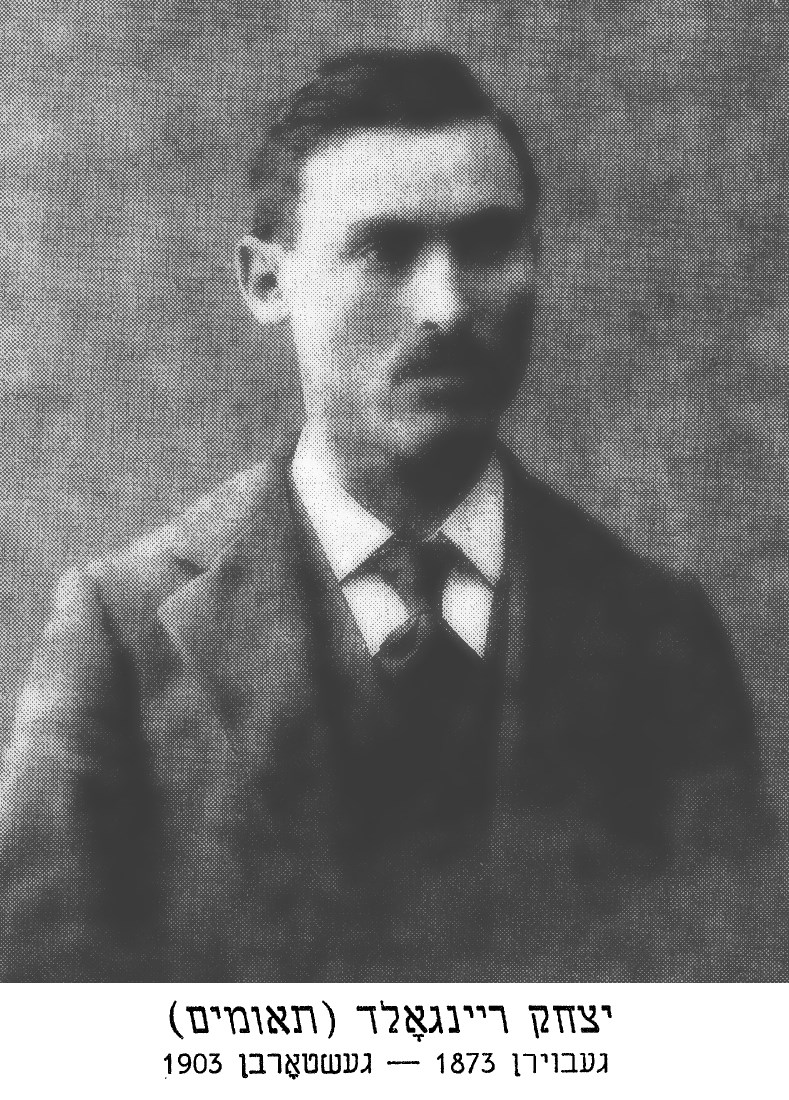
Isaac Reingold

Isaac Reingold (Yitskhok, Itsik, יצחק רײנגאָלד) is the pen name of Isaac Toomim ( תּאומים יצחק) 1873-1903), a Russian-born American poet, lyricist, and singer.

Born in 1873 in Oder, near Loytsk (Lutsk), Volhynia, Ukraine, into a Chasidic family. He received a strict religious education; his father was bitterly opposed to the Enlightenment and a fervent believer in brotherhood and equality.

His poetry and his couplets—often set to melodies of famous English-language popular songs—were popular with working-class audiences. He sang well and performed in concert halls and workers' gatherings. His songs were published in: Lider-magazin, Di idishe bihne, and Teglikher idisher kuryer. He also wrote an opera, Al nahares bovl (By the rivers of Babylon).

He died October 21, 1903, in Chicago.

== Books ==
Reingold's books printed by Chicago publisher Yankev Lidski include:

- Der velt zinger, prekhtige folks-lieder (The world singer, superb folksongs) (1894)
- A bintel blumen, folks-gedikhte (A bouquet of flowers, folks poems) (1895)
- Di strune, oyservehlte theater und folks lieder mit bakante englishe melodyen (The string, extraordinary theater and folk songs with well-known English melodies) (1896)
- Di nayeste reyngolds theater und folks lieder, gezungen mit englishe melodyen (The newest of Reyngold’s theater and folk songs, sung with English melodies) (1896)
- Der fonograf, komishe kupleten und theater lieder (The phonograph, comical couplet theater songs) (1896)
- Geklibene lider (Selected songs) (Chicago: L. M. Shteyn, 1950)
