= Arven Pharmaceuticals =

Arven Pharmaceuticals is a Turkish pharmaceutical corporation headquartered in Istanbul established as a subsidiary of Toksöz Group in 2013. Arven's primary focus is development and production of high-technology inhaler and biotechnology products. The company is specialized on difficult to make products. Arven is the first Turkish company developing biosimilars for global markets, including the US and EU.

Arven has obtained a marketing authorization in 2016 for the biosimilar of Filgrastim, marketed under Fraven, which is the first biosimilar drug, developed and manufactured from cell to final product in Turkey.

Additionally, Arven is the first Turkish company to design and develop a patented Dry Powder Inhaler (DPI) device under Arvohaler trademark and globally introduced Cyplos (salmeterol/fluticasone) product inhaled with Arvohaler device.

Some of the ministry of health foundations have visitations to the company for the vaccine manufacturing potential during COVID-19 pandemic period.

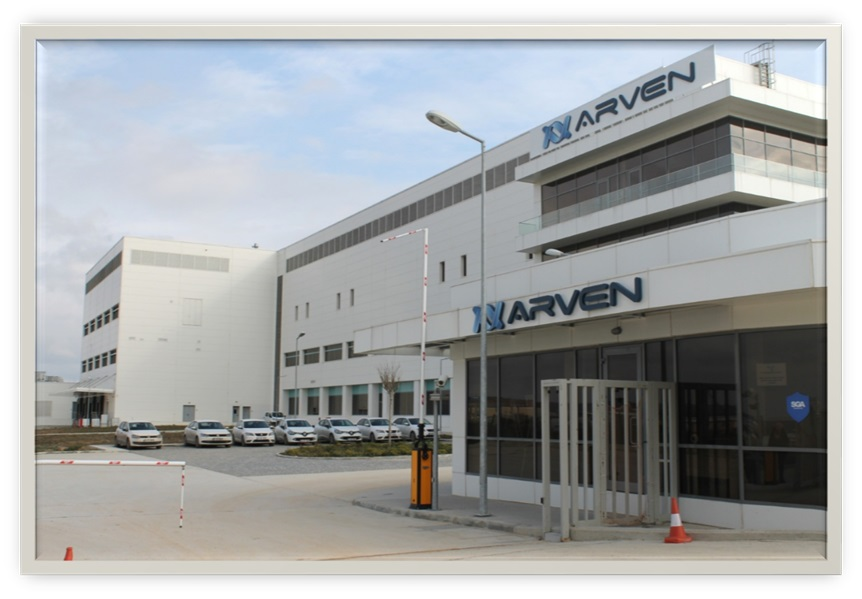
Arven Kırklareli Facility

== History ==
In 2007 the Toksöz Group launched investments to contribute to the development of biotechnological products and the advancement of the pharmaceutical field in Turkey. A Biotechnology Division was first established in the Sanovel Silivri facility within the same year, and research and development work was initiated to produce Turkey's first biosimilar product.

In the following years, the Toksöz Group brought together high-technology inhaler and biotechnology products under separate legal entity as“Arven İlaç San ve Tic. A.Ş.” continuing its investments, the group then decided in 2013 to build a dedicated factory for manufacturing of Arvenproducts.

== Facilities ==
=== Arven Kırklareli factory ===
As of 2020, Arven employs 200 staff in factory and R&D facility.

The factory was built in the Kırklareli Industrial Zoneclose to the western borders of Turkey and started operations by obtaining a manufacturing license from the Pharmaceutical and Medical Devices Agency of Turkey in 2017. Arven Kırklareli factory was constructed on a 30,000-square-meter (320,000 sq ft) area.

=== Arven R&D Center ===
The R&D facility in Selimpaşa-Istanbul was established at the same time period with the manufacturing facility in Kırklareli. R&D Center certificate was granted in 2017 by the Ministry of Industry, and started to develop new products. Arven R&D Center is currently carrying out research and development activities on inhaler (respiration) medicine and biosimilar drugs.

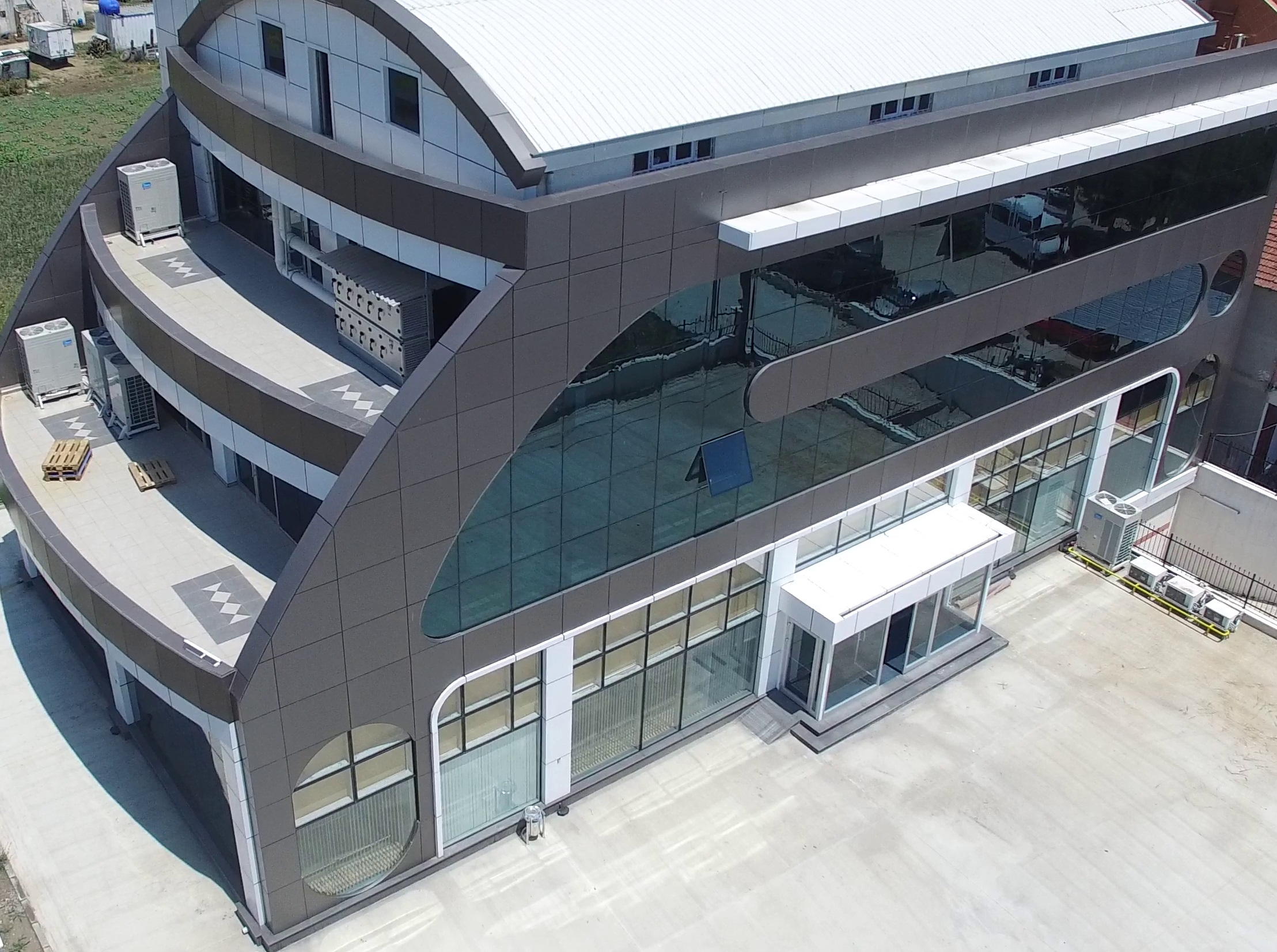
Arven R&D Center

== Biotechnology ==
The research and development activity on biotechnological and biosimilar drugs are divided into two main groups: microbial drugs and mammalian cell culture-based drugs. The biotechnology team at Arven R&D center comprises Microbial Manufacturing, Mammalian Production, Biotechnology R&D and Biotechnology Quality Control divisions.

Biosimilar development project generally includes following basic steps:

Characterization of the reference product, cell line development, analytical method development, process development, head-to-head comparability studies, manufacturing of the product at different scales for toxicology study and clinical trials, stability studies, animal studies, and phase 1 clinical trials.

The facility is utilized for upstream processes, including inoculation, fermentation, cell disruption and harvesting; and downstream processes, including advanced technology filtration and chromatographic purification techniques, and has the capacity to manufacture bulk products in controlled, GMP classified areas. Following the bulk manufacture of products, the final product is obtained through syringe filling under aseptic conditions in GMP areas using validated processes. It was the first GMP certificated-biotechnology manufacturing area in Turkey. Fraven, biosimilar of Filgrastim, is the first biosimilar drug developed from cell to the finished product in Turkey and was approved by Turkish Ministry of Health in April 2016.

The manufacturing protocol of the product was successfully patented before the European Patent Office. This success has also led company to move R&D projects to more complicated biomolecules, such as monoclonal antibodies.

== Inhaler ==
Arven was the first Turkish pharmaceutical company to develop a medical device and corresponding anti-asthmatic product as a dry powder inhaler (DPI) complies with international guidelines and regulations including WHO, ICH, FDA and EMA. The company has new R&D projects on other inhalable molecules on the pipeline.

Salmeterol with fluticasone propionate combined doses are manufactured as 50 mcg-500 mcg, 50 mcg-250 mcg and 50-100 mcg inhalation powder forms. Development of Cyplos Arvohaler products were started in 2006, authorization step in Turkey was completed in 2011 and the products were launched in 2012 to the Turkish market.

Product development started with design and development of a plastic inhalation device (Arvohaler) in 2006 with a 100% percent of domestic capital in Turkey. While research and design studies were conducted internally by a team of people from R&D, IP and other related departments of Arven. Development stages were completed together with a local mold and device manufacturer having a clean room in Turkey.

After the development stage today Arvohaler is a worldwide patented multi-unit dose dry powder inhalation (DPI) device developed by Arven. The device itself is protected in Turkey, EU, US and many other countries globally with a number of patent families.

Arvohaler consists of 18 components, including 16 plastic parts and 2 stainless-steel springs. Whole material selections and documentation of the development stages were performed according to international guidelines and regulations including WHO, ICH, FDA and EMA.

As a whole product; Cyplos Arvohaler is manufactured in DPI Production Unit located in Arven's GMP approved production facilities in clean room conditions. Production consists of subsequent stages.

- Production of plastic inhaler device Arvohaler: Arvohaler plastic components are produced from medical grade plastic materials in a well-equipped device manufacturer in clean room conditions.
- Production of drug product Cyplos Arvohaler: Weighing, mixing, blister filling of the drug product, coiling of blister strips into device
- Final processing including final assembly, labeling and secondary packaging.

Every stage of production and the finished product is controlled by in-process and chemical tests.

== Products ==
The firm's main products are:

- Fraven (Filgrastim)
- Cyplos Arvohaler (salmeterol/fluticasone)
- Tutast Arvohaler(Tiotropium bromide)

== Patents ==
Arven has filed 571 patent applications before the patent offices since its foundation. 298 of the patents belong to the inhaler device(Arvohaler) and corresponding formulation technology inventions. Arven's innovator inhaler device, Arvohaler, succeeded to obtaining patent grants from European Patent Office, USPTO, Japan Patent Office and Chinese State Patent Office. Additionally, the first biotechnology drug patent application in Turkey was filed by Arven Pharmaceuticals. Arven has 23 European granted patents and ranked tenth among all of the Turkish companies in terms of number of registered European patents.
