= Ervin Plány =

Hungarian painter

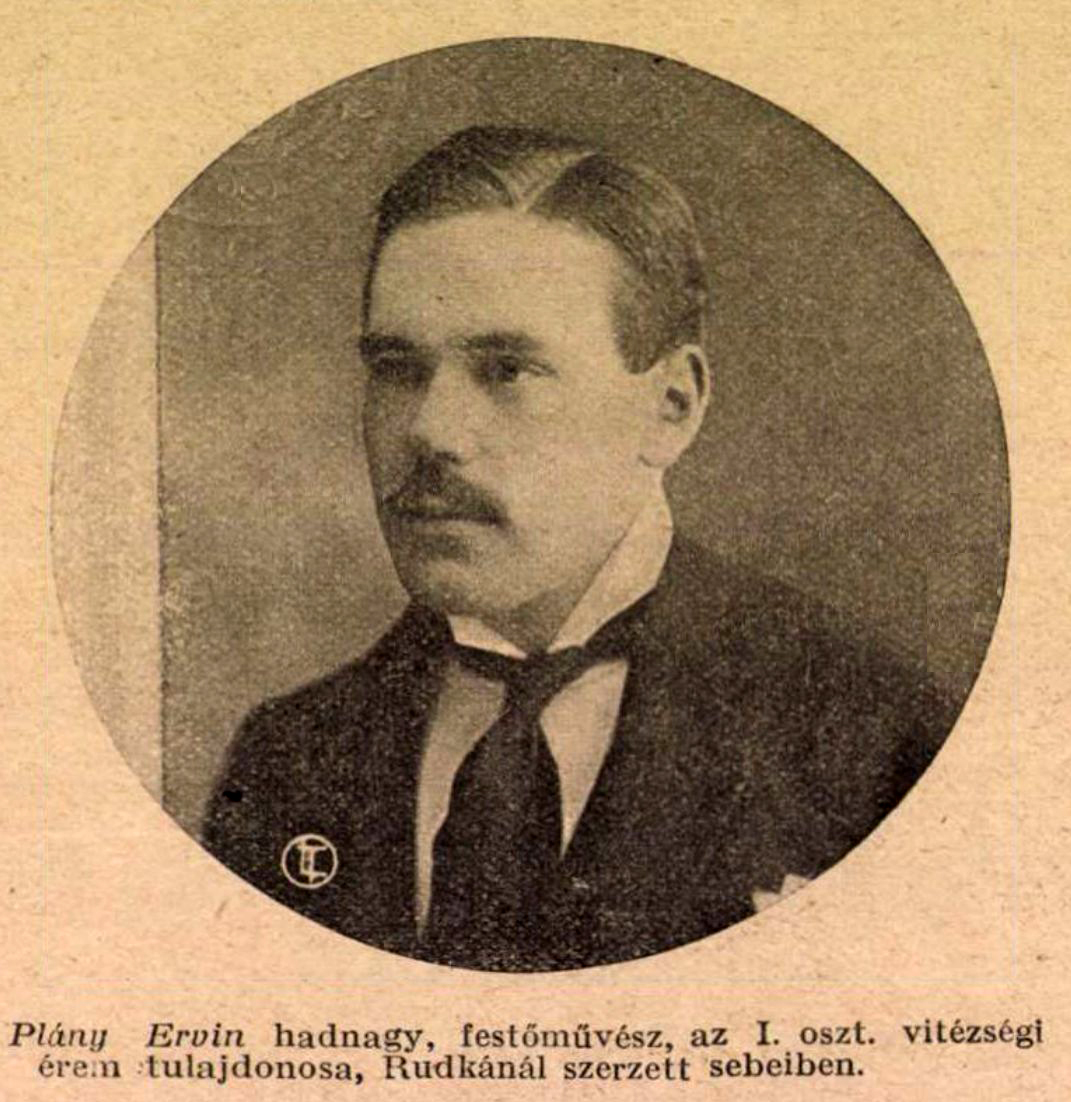
- Born: Ervin Plány; 16 April 1885; Budapest
- Died: 5 January 1916 (aged 30); Budapest

Ervin Plány (16 April 1885 – 5 January 1916) was a Hungarian painter who was exhibited by the Ernst Museum following his death, having served as its secretary during his life. During World War I he was fatally wounded and died after being evacuated to Budapest.

== His life ==
He was born in Budapest. After his graduation from high school, he started studying law. He slowly committed himself to painting. His decisive step in this direction was that first in Paris, in the 1905/1906 academic year. He attended the Model Drawing School during his semester, and then worked for István Réti in Nagybánya between 1906 and 1907. Even after that, he worked for a while at Magyar Nemzet (Hungarian newspaper) as an art and music referent. His commitment is indicated by the fact that he went on a long study trip to Italy, and then worked as a secretary at the then-opened Ernst Museum for a few months.

In 1906, in one of his articles, he was the first to declare that the Neos of Nagybánya had separated. In 1908, he appeared for the first time at the exhibition of the National Salon on Máramarossziget, after which he was a regular exhibitor at exhibitions in Budapest. His works are realistic impressionistic landscapes depicted with strong colors, outdoor scenes (Launches, Gypsy Girl, Dachau landscape). Regarding his painting method, Péter Molnos noted that "in order to increase the color intensity, he did not mix the paint on the palette, but on the canvas". In 1909, he had a collective exhibition at the Museum of Fine Arts.

After the outbreak of World War I, he enlisted as a volunteer in the spring of 1915, reached the rank of cavalry artillery lieutenant on the Eastern Front, and received the great silver gallantry medal for his bravery. He was wounded in battle and died on 5 January 1916. The Ernst Museum organized a legacy exhibition of his works in 1917, and at the same time his works were also featured in the "Hungarian Masters XXIV" exhibition of the Ernst Museum, which was also a memorial exhibition for Plány.

His grave is decorated with a relief by Zsigmond Strobl of Kisfaludi, which he ordered from him – even for his mother. The grave monument in the Fiume Road Graveyard has been protected since 2004.
