= Aravind L. Iyer =

Evolutionary biologist

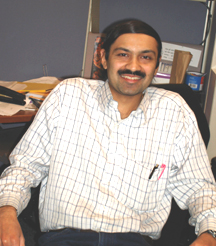
Aravind L Iyer

Aravind L. Iyer is an evolutionary biologist at the National Center for Biotechnology Information in Bethesda, Maryland, United States. Since 2002, he has been Principal Investigator of the Computational Biology Branch. In his research publications he goes by the name of L. Aravind. He was brought up for the most part in Pune. He obtained his master's degree in Biotechnology and subsequently moved to the Texas A&M University to eventually complete his PhD there in December 1999.
