= Ervin Fodor =

British virologist

Ervin Fodor is a British virologist of Hungarian origin born in Czechoslovakia. He is Professor of Virology holding the position of reader in experimental pathology in the Sir William Dunn School of Pathology at the University of Oxford. He is also a professorial fellow at Exeter College, Oxford.

== Education ==
Fodor has an MSc in Chemical Engineering (Slovak University of Technology in Bratislava) and a DPhil in Pathology (University of Oxford).

== Career ==
After postdoctoral studies at the Icahn School of Medicine at Mount Sinai New York and the Sir William Dunn School of Pathology at the University of Oxford, Fodor has been awarded a MRC Senior Non-Clinical Research Fellowship in 2002 followed by a RCUK Academic Fellowship in 2008.

He was appointed as university lecturer in 2011 and then as reader at the University of Oxford with the title of professor of virology.

Fodor's research focuses on the molecular biology of influenza viruses. An early highlight of his work was the development of a reverse genetics system to generate recombinant influenza viruses following plasmid transfection. This technology, developed in collaboration with Peter Palese and Adolfo García-Sastre at the Icahn School of Medicine and George Brownlee at the University of Oxford, was then used to generate live attenuated influenza virus vaccines that are also used in the UK National Childhood Flu Immunisation Programme. His more recent work focuses on the molecular mechanisms used by influenza viruses to copy their genetic information stored in molecules of RNA, interactions of influenza viruses with the host cell and cellular responses to viral infection. In collaboration with Jonathan Grimes from the Division of Structural Biology at the University of Oxford he contributed to understanding the structural basis of influenza virus RNA synthesis by solving structures of the influenza virus RNA polymerase complex.

He is the recipient of the 2019 AstraZeneca Award from the Biochemical Society. The award was presented on 20–22 November 2019 in London, UK at the meeting of the Biochemical Society entitled‘Transcriptions in Health and Disease’ where Fodor delivered a lecture entitled 'The influenza virus RNA polymerase'.

Fodor is a fellow of the Academy of Medical Sciences and was elected as a member of EMBO in 2021.
