= Ervin Cherry =

American serial killer

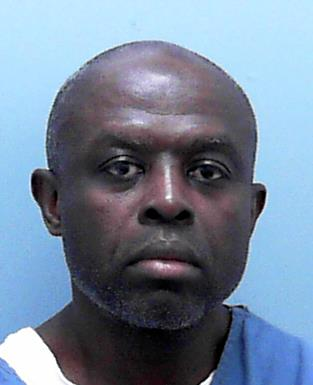
- Born: Ervin Elroy Cherry; March 26, 1966 (age 60); United States
- Status: Incarcerated
- Convictions: First degree murder (3 counts); Aggravated battery with a deadly weapon
- Penalty: Life imprisonment

Details
- Victims: 3
- Span of crimes: 1993–1994
- Country: United States
- State: Florida
- Date apprehended: September 22, 1994
- Imprisoned at: Santa Rosa Correctional Institution

Ervin Elroy Cherry (born March 26, 1966) is an American serial killer who strangled three women to death in Northern Florida between November 1993 and February 1994. He was linked to these crimes after being arrested in Georgia for auto theft, and was subsequently sentenced to life in prison.

== Early crimes ==
Cherry previously served time in prison for assaulting someone on October 1, 1986. He was found guilty of aggravated battery with a deadly weapon and was sentenced to 10 years on May 4, 1987. Cherry was released from prison in the early 1990s.

== Murders ==
After being arrested on an auto theft charge in Savannah, Georgia on September 22, 1994, Cherry, who had been staying at a Salvation Army shelter, was implicated in the murders of two women in Florida. He was charged with two counts of first degree murder and convicted of the November 22, 1993, slaying of Wanda Robinson in St. Johns County, and the February 5, 1994, slaying of Christina Cooper in Putnam County. He was sentenced to life in prison for those murders on January 13, 1995. While initially denying his involvement, Cherry later confessed to the February 1, 1994, murder of Katherine Walker in St. Johns County, saying he had killed her while arguing over a drug deal. He was convicted and received another life sentence for killing Walker in 2010. Florida law permitted the possibility of parole for capital felonies at the time of the murders, albeit it is unclear whether his life sentences are running concurrently or consecutively.

== See also ==
- List of serial killers in the United States
