= Ervin Gashi =

Swiss footballer of Kosovan descent (born 1990)

Personal information
- Full name: Ervin Gashi
- Date of birth: 27 August 1990 (age 36)
- Place of birth: Switzerland
- Height: 1.88 m (6 ft 2 in)
- Position: Centre-back

Team information
- Current team: Estonia (assistant); Prishtina Bern (manager)

Youth career
- Team Bern-West
- Bümpliz
- Young Boys

Senior career*
Years	Team	Apps	(Gls)
2009	Young Boys U21	1	(0)
2009–2011	Thun	2	(0)
2009–2011	→ Thun U21	34	(3)
2011–2012	Köniz	10	(0)
2012–2013	Naters	21	(0)
2013–2014	Solothurn	24	(3)
2014–2016	Prishtina Bern		
2016–2017	FC Wyler		
2019–2020	Prishtina Bern		
Total		92	(6)

Managerial career
- 2016–2017: FC Wyler (player-manager)
- 2017–2018: Thun U18 (assistant)
- 2018–2020: Solothurn (youth)
- 2020–2023: Grasshoppers (youth)
- 2023–: Estonia (assistant)
- 2023–: Prishtina Bern
- * Club domestic league appearances and goals

Ervin Gashi (born 27 August 1990) is a Swiss football coach and former player of Kosovan descent, who is the current assistant manager of Estonia national team and the current manager of 2. Liga Interregional club Prishtina Bern.

== Coaching career ==
=== Grasshoppers U16 ===
On 30 May 2020, the Grasshoppers appointed Gashi as their manager of under-16 team.
