= Ervin L. Jordan Jr. =

American archivist, historian, professor

Academic work
- Discipline: History, archival science
- Institutions: University of Virginia

Ervin L. Jordan Jr. is an American archivist, historian, scholar, author, and educator. He is an associate professor and research archivist at the University of Virginia, Albert and Shirley Small Special Collections Library. He has published several books and articles and book chapters in others' works, and been a historian-consultant for novels as well as delivering lectures, running workshops and curating exhibitions on the American Civil War, Virginia history, and African American history. Jordan has appeared on television as a consulting historian on African-American history and genealogy and delivered lectures at conferences, universities and public events, some which were televised on C-CPAN. He has been praised for his research in Civil War African American and Virginia history, and is among the leading figures in developing, promoting and disseminating Black American history, culture and literature.

== Education ==
Born and raised in Norfolk, Virginia, the son of Carrie and Ervin Sr., Jordan attended the city's racially segregated public schools. His family's first college graduate, he earned history degrees and graduated with honors from Norfolk State University and Old Dominion University.

== Career ==
In 1979, Jordan began working as an archivist at the University of Virginia. Since then, he has held several different positions including university records manager and curator of technical services. His current responsibilities involve outreach, reference, answering research inquiries, processing and organizing manuscript collections, acquisitions recommendations, and special projects work. In 2003, Jordan was named the senior consulting archivist on the University of Virginia's possible collaboration with the University of Botswana.

He spent many years on a solo processing project that arranged and organized the papers of his colleague, mentor and fellow Civil War historian Armstead L. Robinson (1947-1995). These papers (1848-2001, 38 cubic feet) encompass "the development of black studies during the 1960s; the 19th century American South; the Civil War and Reconstruction; and life as an African American student and faculty member at Yale, the State University of New York, the University of Rochester, UCLA, and the University of Virginia from the 1960s through the 1990s." In 2007, Jordan published a tribute review essay on Armstead L. Robinson's posthumously published magnum opus, Bitter Fruits of Bondage: The Demise of Slavery and the Collapse of the Confederacy, 1861–1865 (2005), highlighting the enduring significance of Robinson's scholarship.

Throughout his career Jordan has written about African American history, especially during the Civil War. In a 2017 interview with John Coski of the American Civil War Museum, Jordan explained the legacy and power of the war's monuments and statues:

There are an estimated 13,000 Civil War memorials in the United States. Far too often throughout American history, statues and civic spaces have been ostensibly weaponized as a means of empowerment or oppression. Unquestionably, Confederate monuments reflect the politicized racial attitudes of their communities but in this case somebody's heroes are usually someone else's villains. Many Americans consider them racist because they openly honor secessionist proslavery war heroes--and traitors. None denounces slavery. Given the current pugnacious political climate, we must understand why Confederate monument defenders stridently praise those who defended slavery and secession while a new interracial post-civil rights generation demands their removal as evocative of sanctified traitors, racist slaveholders and white supremacy.

Jordan's 1995 book Black Confederates and Afro-Yankees in Civil War Virginia examines the roles of African Americans on both sides of the conflict. His focus is Confederate Virginia, as it had more African Americans before the Civil War than any other state. His work explains their significance in the Civil War and in shaping the American consciousness. It covers both enslaved and free blacks as well as Confederate and Union black soldiers. One study of the war said of Black Confederates: "Jordan's book is unique in the literature on the southern home front . . . he is the first historian to attempt a comprehensive portrait of slaves and free blacks within a Confederate state. . . The most provocative parts of Jordan's book deal with those slaves who stayed loyal to the Confederacy."

Jordan's scholarship has been influential in the study of African American military history and the role of Black Southerners during the Civil War. Academics have cited his work Black Confederates and Afro-Yankees in Civil War Virginia (1995), particularly his observation that "African-American history is not for the squeamish," a statement that has been noted for its recognition of the complexity and often uncomfortable realities of the historical record. Subsequent works by other scholars, including Racist Symbols and Reparations: Philosophical Reflections on Vestiges of the American Civil War (1998) and Unsung Patriots: African Americans in America's Wars (2023), reflect its continuing impact on scholarship concerning African Americans in military history, race relations, and Civil War studies.

== Affiliations ==
Jordan is a member of professional organizations including the Society of American Archivists, the Organization of American Historians, Phi Alpha Theta, the Association for the Study of African American Life and History (ASALH), the Mid-Atlantic Regional Archives Conference (MARAC) and the Virginia Association of Government Archives and Records Administrators (VAGARA). He has served on local and private, state and federal boards and commissions including the (Virginia) State Historical Records Advisory Board, the Jamestown-Yorktown Board of Trustees, the Board of Trustees of the Virginia Museum of Natural History, Virginia Sesquicentennial of the American Civil War Commission Advisory Council, the Gettysburg Foundation Board of Directors and the Gettysburg Foundation Historians Council, the Supreme Court of Virginia Historical Commission, the Somerset Place Foundation Board of Directors, the Advisory Committee on African-American Interpretation at Monticello (home of Thomas Jefferson, 3rd U. S. president), a senior advisor to the Norfolk State University Board of Visitors, Old Dominion University's General Review Board), the Virginia American Revolution 250 Commission (VA250) African American Advisory Council, the Jamestown-Yorktown Foundation 2019 Commemoration Steering Committee and, the President's Commission on Slavery and the University. Jordan is a past member of the Advisory Board of the National Civil War Chaplains Research Center and Museum (now the Chaplains Museum, Liberty University Department of History), the University of Virginia Faculty and Staff Advisory Group to the Bicentennial Commission, the Museum of the Confederacy Board of Trustees (now the American Civil War Museum), and the Albemarle Charlottesville Historical Society Board of Directors.

Jordan is also a founding and current member of the Society of American Archivists' (SAA) Archivists and Archives of Color Roundtable (formerly the African-American and Third World Archivists Roundtable).On the importance of diversity in archives, he said in an interview with the SAA Newsletter, Archival Outlook:

...though we like to think of the 21st century as one of ever-increasing globalization and an increasingly culturally diverse society, as an African American I'm concerned by the persistence of racism in the archival workplace. I've lectured on this subject at conferences and am a long-standing member of SAA's Archivists & Archives of Color Roundtable. We should not just define diversity. We must practice and embrace it.

In 1996, he was an onscreen historian consultant for a biographical documentary "Abraham Lincoln: Preserving the Union" for the Arts & Entertainment Television Network Series Biography.

He has also been a guest speaker for numerous panels, conferences and events, some televised by C-SPAN, concerning African American history, genealogy, the Civil War, slavery and related historical topics.

Since 2015, he has been an Affiliated Faculty Member of the John L. Nau III Center for Civil War History, University of Virginia College and Graduate School of Arts & Sciences, contributing his expertise in Civil War, military, and African American history to the Center's scholarly and educational initiatives.

In 2018, he was appointed by UVA President Teresa A. Sullivan to join the President's Commission on the University in the Age of Segregation.

== Publications ==
- Selected Verse: Love Poems, Nature Poems, Songs of Youth, Sermons in Poetry, 1973 (poetry contributor)
- Norfolk Virginian-Pilot, 1973-1979 (letters to the editor concerning contemporary and historical issues)
- "Balch Family Papers," Fram: The Journal of Polar Studies Volume 1 (Winter 1984) (article)
- The American Archivist vol. 50, Spring 1987 (book review)
- 19th Virginia Infantry (Virginia Regimental Histories Series), 1987 (co-author)
- Charlottesville and the University of Virginia in the Civil War (Virginia Battles and Leaders Series), 1988 (author)
- Shaman: A Novel, 1992 (historian-consultant)
- Black Southerners in Gray, 1994 (contributor)
- Black Confederates and Afro-Yankees in Civil War Virginia (University of Virginia Press), 1995 (author)
- The African American Odyssey (Library of Congress), 1998 (chapter contributor)
- Charlottesville, An African-American Community, 1998 (historian-consultant)
- Jacob's Ladder: A Story of Virginia During the War, 1998 (novel; historian-consultant)
- New Perspectives on the Civil War: Myths and Realities of the National Conflict, 1998 (chapter contributor)
- Footsteps: African American History, premier issue, 1999 (consulting editor)
- Oxford Companion to American Military History, 1999 (contributor)
- In View of the Great Want of Labor: A Legislative History of African American Conscription in the Confederacy, 1999 (foreword)
- Library of Congress Civil War Desk Reference, 2002 (advisory board and manuscript editor)
- Virginia's Civil War (University of Virginia Press), 2005 (chapter contributor)
- Virginia at War, 1861 (University Press of Kentucky), 2005 (chapter contributor)
- The Greatest Virginians: Examining the Commonwealth's History Through Its People, 2008 (contributor)
- Voices from within the Veil: African Americans and the Experience of Democracy (Cambridge Scholarly Publishing), 2008 (chapter contributor)
- Virginia at War, 1865 (University Press of Kentucky), 2012 (chapter contributor)
- The Key to the Door: Experiences of Early African American Students at the University of Virginia (University of Virginia Press), 2017 (chapter contributor)
- The Founding of Thomas Jefferson's University (Jeffersonian America Series, University of Virginia Press), 2019 (chapter contributor)
- The Buried Cause: Unearthing Hidden History in the Lee Monument Cornerstone (University of Virginia Press), 2026 (chapter contributor)
- "The Great Willoughby Slave Escape of 1776" (Encyclopedia Virginia, Virginia Humanities), 2026 (entry author)

His other works include blogs, book reviews, essays and articles which have appeared in news magazines, academic journals and encyclopedias such as The Encyclopedia of the United States in the Nineteenth Century, The Journal of American History, The Journal of Southern History, The Western Journal of Black Studies, Footsteps: African American History, The Social Studies, Voices from within the Veil: African Americans and the Experience of Democracy, Vinegar Hill Magazine, The Virginia Magazine of History and Biography, The Dictionary of Virginia Biography, and Encyclopedia Virginia biographical sketches of Afro-Virginian Reconstruction politicians. Among his publications is a blog post of letters of an anonymous family of Confederate women trapped by the Union Navy's blockade of Galveston, Texas, and an essay blog and subsequent book chapter of Black residents' responses to Richmond, Virginia's Robert E. Lee Monument, 1890s-2000s, and why similar monuments remain emotively relevant and controversial in the re-contextualization of history and public memory in twenty-first century America. In 2026 he published an analysis of a major example of slave self‑emancipation in Revolutionary War Virginia in the form of the collective escape of a Tidewater plantation's entire enslaved workforce, several ultimately finding refuge by navigating precarious paths to freedom in Afro‑Atlantic communities in New York, Nova Scotia, and Sierra Leone, "a significant instance of African American resistance during the American Revolution, formerly enslaved people . . . redefined their lives and sought equal liberty."
