= Ervin Ollik =

Estonian footballer

Personal information
- Date of birth: 18 July 1915
- Place of birth: Tallinn, Governorate of Estonia
- Date of death: 28 June 1996 (aged 80)
- Place of death: Estonia
- Position: Forward

Senior career*
Years	Team	Apps	(Gls)
1938	JK Tallinna Kalev		

International career
1938	Estonia	1	(0)
- * Club domestic league appearances and goals

Ervin Johannes Ollik (18 July 1915 – 28 June 1996) was an Estonian football player.

Ollik was born in Tallinn to Villem and Rosalie Emilie Ollik. Ollik was buried at Tallinn's Metsakalmistu cemetery.
