= Ervin Duggan =

Retired American Media Businessesman

Commissioner of the Federal Communications Commission
- In office February 28, 1990 - January 30, 1994
- President: George H.W Bush; Bill Clinton

Personal details
- Born: June 30, 1939 Atlanta, Georgia, U.S.
- Occupation: Executive

Ervin S. Duggan (born on June 30, 1939) is a retired American media executive who has served in several management positions, most notably as president of PBS.

Originally from South Carolina and a graduate of Davidson College, Duggan was a Democrat appointed by President George H. W. Bush in 1990 to one of the two Democratic seats on the Federal Communications Commission. Duggan had served as a speechwriter and member of the White House staff of President Lyndon B. Johnson and, at the time of his appointment to the FCC, was in private business as a communications advisor in Washington, D.C.

Duggan frequently spoke and wrote about the future of public broadcasting while serving at the FCC. On Sept. 27, 1993, he made a major speech to the Southern Educational Communications Association in Atlanta, Georgia, making a case for what he called "public bandwidth" as part of the Clinton Administration's telecommunications infrastructure plan. He was announced as the fourth president of PBS at a news conference in Washington, D.C., on December 1, 1993. As president, Duggan sought to revitalize and strengthen PBS' fundraising capacity. He led the creation of a "Democracy Project" initiative in 1996 to significantly expand PBS's news and public affairs programming ahead of the 1996 election cycle. He led PBS's transition to digital technology, including the creation and launch of PBS.org in 1995 and the launch of the PBS Kids digital channel in 1999.

He resigned from PBS in 1999. At the end of his presidency, at least three PBS member stations were caught up in controversy over reports that they had provided information about their station members to the Democratic Party officials.

After leaving PBS, Duggan was named president and CEO of the Society of the Four Arts in Palm Beach, Florida, where he served until his retirement in 2014.
