= Harriet Lange Rheingold =

American psychologist

- Born: February 13, 1908; New York City, US
- Died: April 29, 2000 (aged 92); Chapel Hill, North Carolina, US
- Spouse(s): Joseph Rheingold, 1930-58
- Scientific career
- Fields: Developmental psychology
- Workplaces: University of North Carolina at Chapel Hill

Harriet Lange Rheingold (February 13, 1908 – April 29, 2000) was a child development psychologist who taught at the University of North Carolina, and the author of many publications, some still cited today. The New York Times labeled her “one of the nation’s most prominent developmental psychologists.”

== Early life ==
Rheingold was born Harriet Lange in New York on February 13, 1908, the daughter of Oscar Lange and Lillian Brown (Braun). Both parents were born in the United States, of parents born in Eastern Europe. They were Jewish.

Harriet excelled in high school in Brooklyn and was admitted to Cornell University at age 16 under a special program. Her parents moved with her to Ithaca. She was graduated in 1928 with a bachelor's degree in philosophy, and was admitted to Phi Beta Kappa, the honors society. She taught high school in Ithaca, NY and worked thereafter as an assistant to Arnold Gessel at Yale University. She earned a master's degree in psychology from Columbia University in 1930.

In 1932 she married Joseph C. Rheingold, a psychiatrist in training, whom she met when both were working at Worcester State Hospital in Massachusetts. They had two children, Paul David and Arnold Lange Rheingold. (She later divorced Joseph and remarried.)

Harriet and Joseph lived in Chicago, where Harriet worked as a supervising psychologist at the Illinois Institute for Juvenile Research. During World War II, Harriet accepted a teaching position as professor of psychology at Rockford College in Rockford, IL. Today, the school offers a scholarship in her name.

== Career ==
Rheingold left Rockford for the University of Chicago to pursue a Ph.D. in psychology, which she was awarded in 1955. She studied under and was influenced by one of her teachers, David Shakow. Her first job was at the National Institute of Mental Health, as a research psychologist in the Early Development Section.

In 1964, Rheingold became a research professor at the University of North Carolina-Chapel Hill, where she remained until her retirement in 1978. At UNC, she attained a life time Research Career Award from the National Institute of Child Health and Human Development, which sponsored her research and furnished her salary. These early studies and publications dealt with early childhood development. Her views helped shape widespread understanding that an infant plays an active role in its environment from birth. In 1984 she edited the book Maternal Behavior in Mammals.

Rheingold focused on the positive achievements of infants, from sociability and responsiveness to independence and such valued behaviors as sharing, helping, and caring. Her demonstrations of infant social competence led to a significant change in the ways in which psychologists, pediatricians, and even parents perceive normal infant behavior.

A diplomat in clinical psychology in the American Board of Examiners in Professional Psychology, Rheingold was a member of Phi Beta Kappa and former president of the UNC-CH chapter of Sigma Xi, the Scientific Research Honour Society. She was a fellow of the American Association for the Advancement of Science, the Society for Research in Child Development and fellow of the American Psychological Association, where she served as president of Division 7 in 1972–1973.

Although she became a professor emeritus in 1978, Rheingold continued to do research and publish in her field, as well as supervise Ph.D. candidates. She also wrote her most popular book, The Psychologist’s Guide to an Academic Career, in 1994. She died of lung cancer (she was an ex-smoker) on April 29, 2000, at the age of 92. Her ashes are buried in Greensboro, North Carolina, at the Hebrew Cemetery, along with her parents and brothers.

== Awards and recognition ==
Rheingold received a number of awards and recognitions in her lifetime. In 1977 she was awarded the G. Stanley Hall Award for Distinguished Contributions to Developmental Psychology. She received the Professional Achievement Award from the University of Chicago Alumni Association. The University of North Carolina honored her with an honorary Doctor of Science Degree in 1986 at commencement. After her death the school created the Harriet L. Rheingold Student Research Endowment Fund in the Department of Psychology.

The obituary for Rheingold in The New York Times stated that she was “one of the nation’s most prominent developmental psychologists“ and that “Rheingold is credited with helping change the way psychologists perceive normal infant behavior. Her views helped shape widespread understanding that an infant plays an active role in its environment from birth.” Her obituary in the American Psychologist hailed her as a “great contributor to the field of psychology for over half a century.”
