= Ervin Schiffer =

- Born: 1932; Balassagyarmat, Kingdom of Hungary
- Died: July 2014 (aged 81–82); Antwerp, Belgium
- Occupation(s): Violist, pedagogue
- Known for: Co-founder of the Cours International de Musicque (Morges, Switzerland)
- Spouse: Katy Sebestyen

Ervin Schiffer (1932, Balassagyarmat, Hungary – July 2014, Antwerp, Belgium) was a Hungarian-born violist and pedagogue. Schiffer performed with several chamber ensembles, including the Haydn Quartet, the Tahor Quartet, and the Dekany Quartet, the predecessor of the Haydn Quartet. As a teacher, Schiffer held positions at institutions including the Conservatorium van Amsterdam and La Chapelle Royale in Brussels. He and his wife, violinist Katy Sebestyen, co-founded the Cours International de Musique in Morges, Switzerland, where both were active as artistic leaders.
