= Joseph Rheingold =

Joseph Cyrus Rheingold
- Born: October 5, 1903; New York City
- Died: June 4, 1978 (aged 74); Scituate, Massachusetts
- Education: University of Illinois
- Occupations: Writer and psychoanalyst
- Spouse(s): Harriet Lange Rheingold, 1930-58

Joseph Cyrus Rheingold (October 5, 1903 – June 4, 1978) was a psychiatrist and writer of Fear of Being a Woman (1964) and The Mother, Anxiety and Death (1967), which both center on the theory of maternal destructiveness.

Joseph Rheingold was born in New York City on October 5, 1903. His father was Louis Reingold (Joseph amending the 'H' to his surname as an adult), a Yiddish-language playwright, and a union leader in the tailoring trade. His mother was Esther Friedman, who devoted her life to charitable works. Both of them were originally from Poland. They moved from New York to Chicago in 1912.

Rheingold had four sisters. He married Harriet Lange in 1930, though they divorced in 1958. They had two sons, Paul and Arnold Rheingold.

== Education ==
Rheingold graduated from the University of Wisconsin with a Batchelor's degree in 1926. He then graduated from the University of Illinois Medical School in 1929 and received a master's degree in pathology in 1930. In 1939, he became a Diplomate in neurology and psychiatry. He conducted residencies at Michael Reese Hospital in Chicago, and Illinois Neuropsychiatric Institute in Chicago, becoming a specialist in neuropsychiatry. He received further training at the Memorial Foundation for Neuro-Endocrine Research in Worcester, Massachusetts; Boston Psychiatric Hospital; and the Augusta State Hospital in Maine.

In 1941, Rheingold was awarded a Ph.D. in neurology and psychiatry by the University of Illinois; his thesis dealt with possible organic causes of schizophrenia. The thesis, titled "Autonomic Integration in Schizophrenia: Autonomic Status Determined Statistically, the Thyroid Factor, and a Possible Thyroid-Hypothalamus Mechanism", was published in Psychosomatic Medicine, the official journal of the American Psychosomatic Society.

== Private practice and naval service ==
In 1935, Rheingold opened a private practice in Chicago on North Michigan Ave., which he would operate until 1942. He then served in World War II from 1942 until 1945, as a Commander in the Medical Corps, US Navy, and was stationed in Panama, where he was chief of the neuropsychiatry station at the US Naval Hospital.

Upon return to civilian life, Rheingold practiced psychiatry in Rockford, IL., from 1945 until 1958. He then left individual practice and retired to the Boston area. While living in Boston, he became a research associate in psychiatry at Harvard Medical School, where he conducted research and wrote his two books. Additionally, he served as a psychiatric consultant in the Department of Genecology and Obstetrics at the Boston City Hospital, again a position that was useful in his personal research and writing. Rheingold became director of the court clinic in Hingham District Court, where he examined the mental competency of those arrested. He also did volunteer work in marine biology in Boston harbor.

He was a member of many professional organizations, including Sigma Xi and the American Psychiatric Association, where he was named a Life Fellow.

An avid book collector, Rheingold amassed a very large library about Franklin D. Roosevelt. This included ephemera such as surrender pamphlets dropped in Germany in World War II. In 1958 he donated the entire collection to Beloit College in Wisconsin, where it is accessible today. The collection was described by book dealer Arthur R. Gofer, as "probably the largest and finest personal collection about Roosevelt and the New Deal era in existence."

== Writing ==
Rheingold is most known for writing two books, which were based in large part upon his many years of psychoanalysis of female patients. The first is The Fear of Being a Woman, 1964 (Grune & Stratton). The subtitle describes his thesis: A Theory of Maternal Destructiveness. This work is stated to be based on his twelve years of psychotherapy in Rockford, IL, between 1946 and 1958. At one point, he refers to having analyzed 2,500 patients.

The length of The Fear of Being a Woman can be attributed to Rheingold's efforts to demonstrate the commonality, even universality, of a mother's unconscious destruction of her daughter's psyche. A large part of the book considers the woman at various gynecological and obstetric phases of her life. Rheingold reinforced his own arguments with references to the work of many other writers.

The Fear of Being a Woman was reviewed in many journals, both psychiatric and obstetrical. Many praised the effort and insights, but few if any agreed with the basic concept.

The second, more comprehensive book was The Mother, Anxiety, and Death, published in 1967 by Little Brown. The subtitle, "The Catastrophic Death Complex," pretty well summarizes the thesis, which is that fear of death is universal and that this "anxiety associated with death is due to the reactivation of basic anxiety aroused [. . .] in the early mother-child relationship." During this time, Rheingold was associated with Harvard Medical School and did his writing in Wellesley, Mass., where he resided.

Both Rheingold's books were also published in England and translated into Italian. Both books are marked by clear expository and erudite writing, and logical reasoning. To make his individual points, Rheingold relied on the writings of philosophers, psychologists, and psychiatrists, plus on cultural myths. To this, he added his own insights gained by years of psychoanalysis of patients.

Unfortunately for Rheingold, his fundamental theories did not catch on amongst fellow psychiatrists, or with a broader popular audience. Of course, the intervening past half century has presented a great amount of scientific knowledge, such as on genetics and brain activity, which were not available to him. Today insofar as he is cited, it is in reference to psychoanalysis in the context of his time, as in Edward Dolnick's 1998 monograph "Madness on the Couch: Blaming the Victim in the Heyday of Psychoanalysis". Rheingold is cited multiple times in Dolnick's book.

In the introduction to "Mother, Anxiety and Death," Rheingold thanks a number of people for help. First is Jacques Moron, Ph.D. (1904–1972), for criticisms of the text; Moron was a teacher of philosophy in New York, and himself an author on the same topics. The second is Kurt Eissler, M.D., who was a writer on these same topics. He was reported to have eaten the flesh of Rhinos in the wild during a camping.

Rheingold had a mother, a wife and children of his own. It is unknown how he viewed his own interpersonal relationships. In "The Mother, Anxiety, and Death," he does state (p.125) that he had a death complex, a complex in psychoanalytical theory being "a core pattern of emotions, memories, perceptions, and wishes in the personal unconscious organized around a common theme." For Rheingold, then, the concept of death was a source of deep-seated and complicated anxiety.

== Death ==
Rheingold died on June 4, 1978, at the age of 75 due to a heart attack. He is buried in Scituate, Massachusetts.
