= Ervín Kováč =

Czechoslovak footballer (1911–1972)

Personal information
- Date of birth: 16 June 1911
- Date of death: 30 October 1972 (aged 61)
- Position: Defender

Senior career*
Years	Team	Apps	(Gls)
1937–1943	Slovan Bratislava		

International career
1937	Czechoslovakia	1	(0)
1939–1942	Slovakia	8	(0)
- * Club domestic league appearances and goals

Ervín Kováč (16 June 1911 – 30 October 1972) was a footballer who played international football for both Czechoslovakia and Slovakia. He played as a defender for Slovan Bratislava.
