= Arvin Reingold =

American politician (1930–2020)

Arvin Harold Reingold (July 22, 1930 – October 18, 2020) was an American politician and lawyer.

Reingold was born in New York City, New York. He moved to Chattanooga, Tennessee with his family when he was a teenager and lived in Chattanooga until 2015. He served in the United States Army during the Korean War. He received his bachelor's degree from University of Chattanooga and his law degree from University of Tennessee College of Law. Reingold was admitted to the Tennessee bar and practiced law in Chattanooga. Reingold served in the Tennessee House of Representatives from 1963 to 1965 and was a Democrat. Reingold died in Atlanta, Georgia.
