= Ervín Hoida =

World War II veteran (1918–2024)

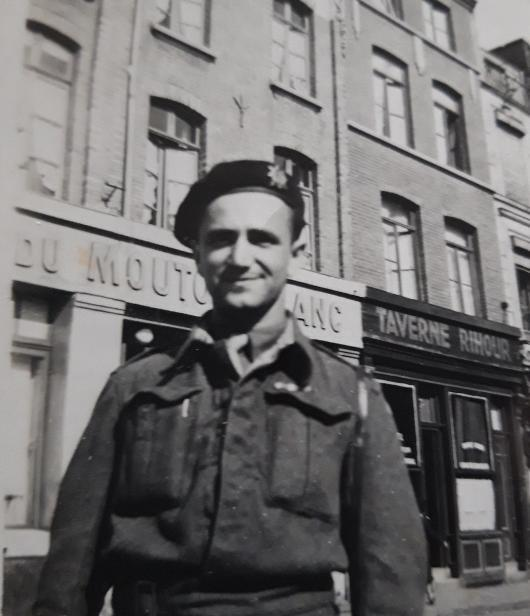
- Hoida during World War II as a soldier in France
- Born: 30 November 1918; Ostrava, Czechoslovakia
- Died: 14 February 2024 (aged 105); Wirral, England
- Military career
- Allegiance: Czechoslovakia; France; United Kingdom
- Rank: Major
- Unit: (Czechoslovakia) Independent Armoured Brigade
- Conflicts: World War II: Battle of France; Siege of Dunkerque; Operation Overlord; Prague offensive
- Awards: State Defense Cross Czechoslovak War Cross Medal of Merit

Ervín Hoida (30 November 1918 – 14 February 2024) was the last surviving Czechoslovak veteran of the Battle of France.

== Biography ==
Hoida, born in Ostrava, was the youngest of three sons born to Jewish parents, Ferdinand and Frantiska (née Enochova). His journey began with woodworking studies at a college in Valašské Meziříčí, followed by an assistant manager position at the Schnitzer factory in Krnov in 1937. Concerned about the treatment of Jews in Germany, his father, a successful businessman, initiated plans to leave the country. With the occupation of Czechoslovakia in 1939, the parents sent their belongings to London and attempted to depart for Haifa, only to be redirected to Mauritius. Meanwhile, Hoida, his brothers, and their wives traveled to Italy on student passes. Hoida managed to navigate to France under cover of darkness, landing in Nice, and sought assistance from the Czechoslovak consulate.

He enlisted in the Foreign Legion and went to Sidi Bel Abbès, French Algeria for training. Later, he joined the 1st Infantry Regiment Czech Army, stationed for rear guard duty northeast of Paris. Forced to retreat, he swam across the river at Gien after a bridge on the Loire was destroyed. While his brothers remained in France, Hoida traveled to Gibraltar before reaching Liverpool, England, where he joined other 4,000 soldiers in the Czech Independent Armoured Brigade. During this time, he married Isabel Lucas who worked for the Auxiliary Territorial Service and in the summer of 1943, he underwent a tank driver's course. Afterwards, his battalion's tanks were involved in the siege of Dunkerque before eventually reaching to Czechoslovakia's borders.

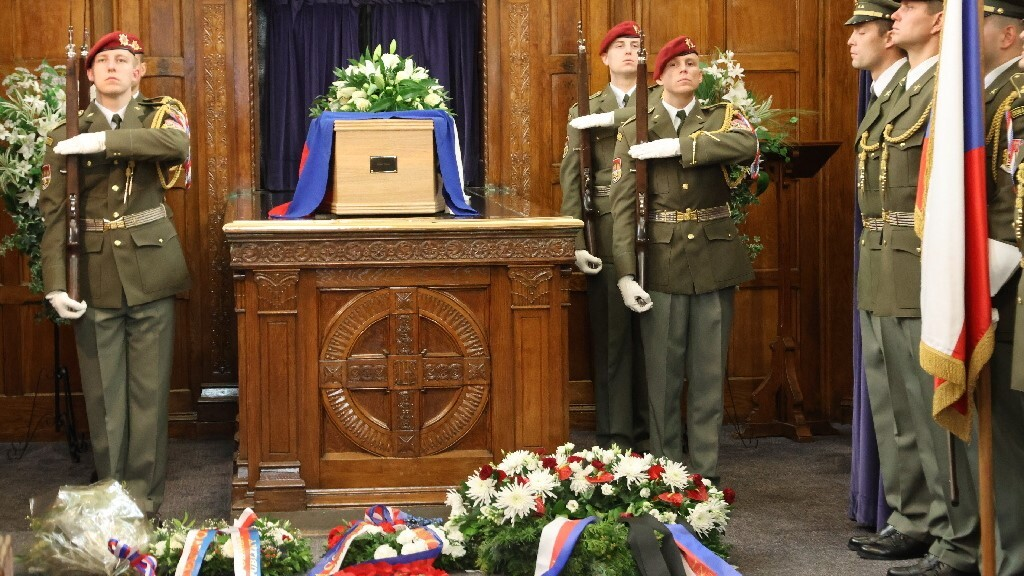
Hoida funeral in Great Britain (2024)

After returning to Ostrava with his wife, Hoida immigrated back to England to escape the communist regime. He worked as a draughtsman at Heaton Tabb, a Liverpool firm specializing in crafting interior furnishings for opulent ocean liners. Subsequently, he ascended to the role of executive director at Rackstraw, a company based in Worcester, renowned for its production of exquisite reproduction antique furniture, until his retirement in 1983. Following the death of his wife in 1997, with whom he had two sons, he left Malvern Hills and returned to Merseyside where he married Lena Binks in 2005. He also spent twelve years living in Spain before settling in Wirral. Hoida died on 14 February 2024, at the age of 105.
