= MV Arvin =

Bulk cargo vessel (1974–2021)

History
- Name: Volgo-Balt 189 (1974–1997); Arvin (1997–2021)
- Owner: USSR (1974–1992); White Sea & Onega Sg Co (1992–1997); Delphin Maritime Co Ltd (1997–2009); RE Sg & Trade Ltd (2009–2013); Arvin Sg Ltd (2016–2021)
- Operator: Tesoro Marine LLC
- Port of registry: Petrozavodsk, Russian SFSR, USSR (1974–1992); Valletta, Malta(1992–2013); Phnom Penh, Cambodia (2013–2016); Malakai Harbor, Palau (2016–2021)
- In service: 1974
- Out of service: 2021
- Identification: ITU: T8A2278; IMO number: 8874316
- Fate: Sank after breaking up in heavy seas

General characteristics
- Type: General cargo ship
- Tonnage: 3,509 t
- Displacement: 4,761 t
- Length: 114 m (374 ft 0 in)
- Beam: 13 m (42 ft 8 in)
- Draught: 3.85 m (12 ft 8 in) (summer)
- Installed power: 1,030 kW (1,380 hp)
- Propulsion: Diesel
- Speed: 6.5 knots (12.0 km/h; 7.5 mph)
- Capacity: 4,724 m^{3} (166,800 cu ft)
- Crew: 12

MV Arvin was a Ukrainian bulk cargo ship that broke in two and sank in heavy seas off the coast of Bartın, Turkey, in 2021. A video of the ship breaking apart was posted on YouTube. Of the 12 crew members aboard, six survived the sinking. Three bodies were recovered, while the remaining three were reported missing and presumed dead.

== History ==
Originally built in 1974 in Czechoslovakia as the Volgo-Balt 189, the MV Arvin was designed as a lake and river freighter. Over the course of her service she was sold and reflagged several times. In 1997 she was named Arvin by Delphin Maritime Co. Ltd., a name she retained for the remainder of her career.

The Volgo-Balt class were lake and river freighters, designed to operate in generally calm waters and not intended for the open sea. Nevertheless, many have been used on and around the Black Sea. Several have sunk, including the Volgo-Balt 214, which was lost in 2019 with six of its 13 crew killed. Two months after the Arvin sank, the Volgo-Balt 179 also went down in the Black Sea, with 10 of its 13 crew surviving.

In 2020 port officials in Georgia reported severe deck corrosion and poorly maintained weather hatches on the Arvin, recommending that the ship be scrapped. Her owner, however, kept her in service. She was scheduled for a major audit in April 2021.

== Sinking ==
On 2 January 2021, the ship departed Poti, Georgia, bound for Burgas, Bulgaria. She was carrying approximately 2,900 tons of urea intended for use as fertilizer. On 5 January she sought shelter from adverse weather off the coast of Sinop, Turkey, where she remained for nine days. On 14 January she set sail again, but anchored at Bartın, Turkey, the following day in anticipation of further adverse weather.

On 17 January 2021, the weather deteriorated. Heavy seas of 2–3 metres (6 ft 7 in – 9 ft 10 in), combined with winds at force 5–6 (17–27 knots, 31–50 km/h, 20–31 mph), caused the vessel to pitch and roll. At approximately 11:00 a.m. local time, the captain ordered the crew to apply additional power from the main engines. At around 12:20 p.m., the Arvin broke in two amidships. The captain immediately radioed a distress call, triggered an alarm, and broadcast a message over the intercom instructing the crew to abandon ship.

Ten of the twelve crew gathered on the poop deck, most wearing immersion suits and life jackets. The captain and first officer were unable to join the group but had been assisted into immersion suits by the second officer before he joined the others. According to most accounts, the chief engineer lacked an immersion suit, despite there being enough on board, although the welder reported that the deck cadet did not have one either.

As the vessel began to list to port, one or two cadets fell into the water, possibly including the deck cadet who had not yet donned an immersion suit. Within another two minutes, the remaining crew began to abandon ship. A total of five—among them the third officer, cook, motorman, third engineer and a cadet—made it into a life raft, while several others, including the bosun, jumped into the sea. The chief engineer and second engineer were the last to enter the water from the poop deck.

According to crew interviews, two pairs of crew members—among the four or more who did not reach the life raft—held onto separate pieces of wood to stay afloat. The swell prevented those in the liferaft and the swimmers from joining each other. Not all who made it into the raft or clung to the wood survived. The Turkish Coast Guard arrived within two and a half hours, rescuing six survivors and recovering three bodies.

The survivors were the cadet in an immersion suit who had fallen into the water, the chief engineer who entered the water without an immersion suit, the second officer, in an immersion suit, and three crew members in immersion suits who reached the raft: the welder, the second engineer and the motorman. The bodies of the cook, a cadet, and the first officer were recovered, but the bodies of the captain, the bosun, and the deck cadet without an immersion suit, were never found.
