= Ervin Feldheim =

Hungarian mathematician

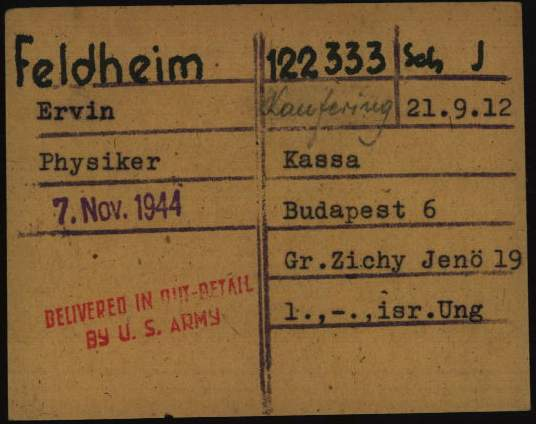
Registry card of Ervin Feldheim as a prisoner at Dachau Nazi Concentration Camp

Ervin Feldheim (Kassa, September 21, 1912 – Bor, March 12 1944) was a Hungarian mathematician working on analysis, particularly, approximation theory. He was killed by the Nazis in 1944.

== Selected publications ==
- Feldheim, Ervin (1942). "Relations entre les polynomes de Jacobi, Laguerre et Hermite". Acta Mathematica. 75 (1): 117–138. doi:10.1007/BF02404102.
- Feldheim, Ervin (1963). "On the positivity of certain sums of ultraspherical polynomials". Journal d'Analyse Mathématique. 11 (1): 275–284. doi:10.1007/BF02789988. S2CID 123018700.
