= Irvine (name) =

Irvine is a Scottish surname, which also became a given name. It is derived from the area of river Irvine in Scotland. It is also common in Northern Ireland, probably as a result of Ulster Scots migration. Notable people with the name include:

== Surname ==
- Acheson Irvine (1837–1916), Canadian police commissioner
- Alan Irvine (disambiguation), several people

- Alan Irvine (designer), Royal Designers for Industry award for exhibition and museum design
- Alan Irvine (footballer born 1958) (born 1958), Scottish footballer and manager
- Alan Irvine (footballer born 1962) (born 1962), Scottish footballer

- Alexander Irvine (disambiguation)

- Alexander C. Irvine (born 1969), American SF writer
- Alexander Irvine (knight), 15th century laird of Drum Castle and chief of Clan Irvine
- Alexander Irvine (MP), British Member of Parliament for East Looe (UK Parliament constituency)
- Alexander Forbes Irvine of Drum FRSE
- Alexander Irwin, also spelled Irvine, British Army general

- A. M. Irvine Amelia Mary Irvine (1866–1950), Anglo-Irish writer
- Andrew Irvine (disambiguation), several people

- Andrew Irvine (mountaineer) (1902–1924), English mountaineer
- Andrew David Irvine (born 1958), Canadian philosopher and educator
- Andrew Irvine (bassist) (born 1969), American bassist

- Andy Irvine (musician) (born 1942), Irish folk musician
- Andy Irvine (rugby union) (born 1951), Scotland player and administrator
- Archie Irvine (1946–2020), Scottish footballer
- Arthur Irvine (1909–1978), British politician
- Barbara Haney Irvine (born 1944), American advocate for the preservation of women's historic sites
- Bill and Bobbie Irvine (1926–2008 and 1932–2004), British ballroom dancers
- Bobby Irvine (footballer born 1900) (1900–1979), Irish footballer
- Bobby Irvine (footballer born 1942) (born 1942), Irish footballer
- Brian Irvine (disambiguation), several people

- Brian Irvine (composer) (born 1965), Northern Irish composer
- Brian Irvine (footballer), Scottish footballer
- Brian Irvine (cricketer), South African test cricketer

- Bulldog Irvine (1853–1897), Scottish rugby union footballer
- Christopher Irvine (born 1970), American-born Canadian professional wrestler better known as Chris Jericho
- Daniel Irvine (born 1982), Australian rugby league footballer
- Daryl Irvine (born 1964), American baseball pitcher
- David Irvine (disambiguation), several people

- David Irvine (blackjack player), engineer and blackjack player
- David Irvine (Canadian politician) (1835–1924), Irish-born farmer and political figure in Canada
- David Irvine (diplomat) (1947–2022), Australian diplomat

- Del Irvine (1892–1916), Canadian ice hockey player
- Derry Irvine (born 1940), British lawyer
- Don Irvine (born 1954), Canadian canoer
- Duncan Irvine, Scottish rugby union footballer
- Eddie Irvine (born 1965), Northern Irish racing driver
- Edith Irvine (1884–1949), American photographer
- Fely Irvine (born 1989), Australian musician member of Hi-5
- Frank Irvine (1858–1931), American judge
- Frederick Robert Irvine (1898–1962), British botanist
- Gary Irvine (born 1985), Scottish footballer
- George Irvine (1948–2017), American basketball player and coach
- George Irvine (politician) (1826–1897), Canadian lawyer, judge, professor and political figure
- Gerard D'Arcy-Irvine (1862–1932), Australian bishop
- Godman Irvine (1909–1992), Canadian-born British politician
- Hamish Irvine, British auto racing driver from Scotland
- Hans Irvine (1856–1922), Australian politician and winemaker
- Hazel Irvine (born 1965), British television presenter
- Helen Douglas Irvine (1880–1947), Scottish novelist, historian and translator
- Ian Irvine (born 1950), Australian author
- Irvine family, American family of landowners
- Jack Irvine (John Alfred Irvine, 1912–1996), Canadian politician
- Jackson Irvine (born 1993), Australian soccer player
- James Irvine (disambiguation), several people

- James Irvine (chemist) (1877–1952), British chemist
- James Irvine (designer) (1958–2013), London-born designer working in Milan
- James Irvine (educator) (1793–1835), American university president
- James Irvine (Pennsylvania politician) (1735–1819), Pennsylvania soldier and politician
- James Irvine (Quebec businessman) (1766–1829), Canadian businessman and political figure

- Jeremy Irvine (born 1990), British actor
- Jessie Irvine (disambiguation)

- Jessie Irvine (born 1989), American professional pickleball player
- Jessie Seymour Irvine (1836–1887), Scottish musical arranger

- Jim Irvine (field hockey) (born 1948), Australian field hockey player
- Jim Irvine (footballer) (born 1940), Scottish footballer
- Jock Irvine (born 1944), Australian cricketer
- John Irvine (disambiguation), several people

- John Irvine (journalist), Northern Irish journalist
- John Irvine (priest) (born 1949), British priest
- John J. Irvine (born 1852), railroad worker, engineer, and politician in Chattanooga, Tennessee
- John Maxwell Irvine (1939-2012), British physicist

- Joseph Irvine, English footballer
- Josephus S. Irvine (1819–1876), Confederate major
- Kathi Irvine, American statistician
- Keith Irvine (1928–2011), American-based interior designer of Scottish descent
- Ken Irvine (1941–1991), Australian rugby league player
- Lee Irvine (born 1944), South African cricketer
- Leonard Irvine (1906–1973), English cricketer
- Louise Irvine, Scottish general practitioner
- Lucy Irvine (born 1956), British author
- Lyn Irvine (1901–1973), English journalist and writer
- Margaret Irvine (1948-2023), British crossword compiler
- Martyn Irvine (born 1985), Irish cyclist
- McCausland Irvine, Canadian politician
- Michael Irvine (born 1939), British politician
- Murray Irvine (1924–2005), British priest
- Olive Lillian Irvine (1895–1969), Canadian teacher and politician
- Paula Irvine (born 1968), American actress
- Reed Irvine (1922–2004), American media critic
- Richard Irvine (1910–1976), American art director and Disney employee
- Robert Irvine (disambiguation), several people

- Robert Irvine (born 1965), British celebrity chef
- Robert Irvine (rugby league), New Zealand rugby league footballer who played in the 1910s

- Robin Irvine (1900–1933), British film actor
- Sadie Irvine (1887–1970), American artist and educator
- Sammy Irvine (born 1956), Scottish footballer
- Scott Irvine (born 1953), Canadian musician
- Ted Irvine (born 1944), Canadian ice hockey player; father of Chris Jericho (above)
- Thomas Irvine (1913–1985), British priest
- Thomas Alexander Irvine (died 1963), Scottish soldier
- Vernon K. Irvine, American football coach
- W. D. Irvine, 1890 American football coach
- Weldon Irvine (1943–2002), American composer
- William Irvine (disambiguation), several people

- William Irvine (Australian politician) (1858–1943), Australian politician
- William Irvine (Canadian politician) (1885–1962), Canadian politician, journalist and clergyman
- William Irvine (chemist) (1743–1787), Scottish chemist
- William Irvine (New York politician) (1820–1882), American soldier and politician from New York
- William Irvine (missionary) (fl.1900–1940), Indian magazine editor
- William Irvine (physician) (1741–1804), American politician
- William Irvine (Scottish evangelist) (1863–1947)
- William Irvine (soldier) (1298–?), Scottish soldier and landowner
- William D. Irvine, Canadian writer, historian and academic

- Willie Irvine (1943–2025), Irish footballer
- Willie Irvine (footballer born 1956) (born 1956), Scottish association footballer
- Willie Irvine (footballer born 1963) (born 1963), Scottish footballer and manager
- Wilson Irvine (1869–1936), American painter

== Given name ==
- Irvine Arditti (born 1953), British musician
- Irvine Barrow (1913–2005), Canadian politician
- Irvine Boocock (1890–?), English footballer
- Irvine Bulloch (1842–1898), American naval officer
- Irvine Dearnaley (1877–1965), English cricketer
- Irvine Clifton Gardner (1889–1972), American physicist
- Irvine Geddes (1882–1962), Scottish rugby union footballer
- Irvine Glennie (1892–1980), British navy officer
- Irvine W. Grote (1899–1972), American chemist and scholar
- Irvine Laidlaw (born 1943), Scottish businessman
- Irvine Lenroot (1869–1949), American politician
- Irvine M. Levine, American physician
- Irvine Masson (1887–1962), Australian chemist and educator
- Irvine U. Masters (1823–1865), American politician
- Irvine Page (1901–1991), American physiologist
- Irvine Patnick (1929–2012), British politician
- Irvine Robbins (1917–2008), Canadian-American entrepreneur, co-founder of Baskin-Robbins
- Irvine Robertson (1882–1956), Canadian rower
- Irvine Sellar, British property developer
- Irvine Shillingford (1944–2023), Dominican cricketer
- Irvine Thornley (1883–1955), English footballer
- Irvine Welsh (born 1958), Scottish novelist, best known for Trainspotting

== See also ==
- Clan Irvine, Scottish clan
- Earvin
- Ervin (disambiguation)
- Ervine
- Erving (disambiguation)
- Erwan
- Erwin (disambiguation)
- Irvin
- Irving (disambiguation)
- Irwin (disambiguation)
