= Australian cricket team in Ceylon and India in 1969–70 =

International cricket tour

	Australia	India
- Dates: 31 October – 28 December 1969
Captains	Bill Lawry	Mansoor Ali Khan Pataudi

Test series
- Result: Australia won the 5-match series 3–1
Most runs	Keith Stackpole (368)	Ashok Mankad (357)
Most wickets	Ashley Mallett (28)	EAS Prasanna (26)

The Australia national cricket team toured Ceylon and India in the last three months of 1969. The team, captained by Bill Lawry, played five Test matches against India, captained by the Nawab of Pataudi Jr. The Australians also played first-class matches versus each of the five Indian Zone teams: Central, North, West, East and South. In Ceylon, they played one first-class game against Ceylon and three minor matches. Australia won the Test series in India 3–1 with one match drawn. It was to be Australia's last Test series win in India until Ricky Ponting and Adam Gilchrist's side's victory in the 2004-05 series.

== Series lead up ==
Australia came into the series with a win under its belt against Garfield Sobers' West Indians at home the previous season. They had also retained The Ashes by drawing the 1968 series in England. Prior to the Australians' arrival, India had just managed to draw its home series against New Zealand by drawing the deciding Third Test because of rain; India had been 7/76 chasing 268.

== Squads ==
India	Australia
Mansoor Ali Khan Pataudi (c); Chandu Borde; Ajit Wadekar; EAS Prasanna; Farokh Engineer (wk); Dilip Sardesai; Bishan Singh Bedi; Ashok Mankad; Rusi Surti; Syed Abid Ali; Subrata Guha; Eknath Solkar; Ashok Gandotra; Ambar Roy; Srinivasaraghavan Venkataraghavan; G R Vishwanath	Bill Lawry (c); Ian Chappell; Keith Stackpole; Ian Redpath; Paul Sheahan; Doug Walters; Brian Taber (wk); Ray Jordon; Laurie Mayne; Jock Irvine; Graham McKenzie; John Gleeson; Ashley Mallett; Alan Connolly; Eric Freeman

== First class games ==
The Australian cricket team played three minor matches in Ceylon before the first-class fixture against the Ceylonese national team on 24 October; the game was drawn. Australia's first match in India was against West Zone, a three-day match, from 31 October to 2 November, also ending in a draw.

=== Three-day match: West Zone vs Australians ===
31 October–2 November
Scorecard

Australians	v	West Zone
340/7d (112 overs); Bill Lawry 89; Ajit Pai 2/61 (22 overs)		344/6d (126 overs); Chandu Borde 113*; Graham McKenzie 4/53 (25 overs)
150/2 (54 overs); Ian Chappell 84*; Uday Joshi 1/55 (21 overs)

Match drawn
Nehru Stadium, Pune
Umpires: Ahmed Mamsa and B. Satyaji Rao

- Australia won the toss and elected to bat.

Australia won the toss and elected to bat on a "greenish than usual" wicket. The Australians declared after scoring 340/7 in their first innings with captain and opener Bill Lawry scoring the highest, 89. In reply, West Zone captain Chandu Borde scored an unbeaten 113 before declaring after taking the score to 344/6. Ian Chappell for the Australians attacked the West Zone in their second innings, scoring eleven boundaries in his 84, taking the team's score to 150/2 at the end of third and final day's play.

=== Three-day match: Central Zone vs Australians ===
11–13 November
Scorecard

Central Zone	v	Australians
153 (66.5 overs); Salim Durani 55; Ashley Mallett 3/42 (15 overs)		321 (89.3 overs); Doug Walters 84; Kailash Gattani 3/57 (23.3 overs)
136 (65.1 overs); Hanumant Singh 40; Ashley Mallett 7/38 (27.1 overs)

Australians won by an innings and 32 runs
Sawai Mansingh Stadium, Jaipur
Umpires: Judah Reuben and Samar Roy (Ind)

- Central Zone won the toss and elected to bat.

=== Three-day match: North Zone vs Australians ===
22–24 November
Scorecard

Australians	v	North Zone
335/6d (95 overs); Ian Chappell 164; Samir Chakrabarti 2/90 (27 overs)		261 (94 overs); Mohinder Amarnath 68; Eric Freeman 6/63 (21 overs)
126/7d (59.1 overs); Brian Taber 53; Ashok Gandotra 3/11 (11.1 overs)		70/2 (43 overs); Vinay Lamba 37*; Ian Chappell 1/1 (3 overs)

Match drawn
Gandhi Stadium, Jalandhar
Umpires: V. Rajagopal and Har Sharma

- Toss unknown.

=== Three-day match: East Zone vs Australians ===
6–8 December
Scorecard

Australians	v	East Zone
250 (95.5 overs); Laurie Mayne 72; Dilip Doshi 4/39 (34 overs)		157 (67.4 overs); Subrata Guha 31; Ashley Mallett 5/37 (20 overs)
134/6d (37 overs); Bill Lawry 30; Dilip Doshi 3/27 (11 overs)		131 (63.2 overs); Raja Mukherjee 33; John Gleeson 5/22 (19.2 overs)

Australians won by 96 runs
Nehru Stadium, Guwahati
Umpires: Sunil Banerjee and M. S. Sivasankariah

- Australians won the toss and elected to bat.

=== Three-day match: South Zone vs Australians ===
20–22 December
Report

South Zone	v	Australians
239/9d (107 overs); Srinivasaraghavan Venkataraghavan 42; Laurie Mayne 4/67 (36 overs)		195 (64.5 overs); Bill Lawry 120; B. S. Chandrasekhar 4/55 (20 overs)
155/6d (52 overs); Gundappa Vishwanath 38; John Gleeson 2/29 (13 overs)		90/8 (52 overs); Ian Redpath 24; EAS Prasanna 6/11 (14 overs)

Match drawn
Central College Ground, Bangalore
Umpires: Nagaraja Rao and N. S. Rishi

- South Zone won the toss and elected to bat.

Election to bat first after winning the toss, South Zone ended day one at 204/7. An out-of-form Mansoor Ali Khan Pataudi scored 10 runs in 70 minutes before being dismissed by Australians' pacer Laurie Mayne. After captain M. L. Jaisimha declared his team's innings after they made 239, batting 55 minutes into day two, Australians got off to a strong start. Captain Bill Lawry scored 120, including three sixes, putting on 90 runs for the first wicket with Ian Redpath, who made 29. Subsequently, a middle- and lower-order batting collapse saw the team dismissed for 195. South Zone's second innings started off poorly losing two wickets for 13 runs at the end of the day's play. Declaring at 155/6, Australia were set a target of 200 runs in 170 minutes. The Australians were reduced to 53/8 in their second innings with EAS Prasanna picking up six wickets. Annoyed by defensive batting by Lawry and John Gleeson for the ninth wicket, the crowd began to hurl stones into the ground, following which the match was abandoned as a draw, with the score at 90/8, four minutes from close of play. It was reported by The Statesman that Australians' captain Bill Lawry and players Ian Redpath and Graham McKenzie allegedly assaulted "some Indian Press photographers" following the match, which was later denied by Australia team manager Fred Bennett.

== Test series ==
=== First Test ===
4–9 November
Scorecard

India	v	Australia
271 (135.4 overs); Mansoor Ali Khan Pataudi 95; Graham McKenzie 5/69 (29 overs)		345 (169.4 overs); Keith Stackpole 103; EAS Prasanna 5/121 (49 overs)
137 (90.2 overs); Ajit Wadekar 46; John Gleeson 4/56 (32 overs)		67/2 (26.5 overs); Ian Chappell 31*; Rusi Surti 2/9 (4 overs)

Australia won by 8 wickets
Brabourne, Bombay
Umpires: I. Gopalakrishnan (Ind) and Sambhu Pan (Ind)

- India won the toss and elected to bat.
- 6 November was a rest day.

The first Test was scheduled between 4 and 9 November. It was originally scheduled to be played in Ahmedabad, but was moved to Bombay due to communal riots in the city. India won the toss and batted first in front of a 40,000 strong packed stadium. Openers Dilip Sardesai and Farokh Engineer lost their wickets to a quick Graham McKenzie after a good start. Having lost three wickets for 42, Ashok Mankad (74), who was promoted up the order, and Pataudi (95), put on 146 runs, then a record stand against Australia for the fourth wicket, after being dropped once each. A subsequent middle- and lower-order collapse took the score from 202/4 at the end of day one to 271 all out shortly after lunch on day two. McKenzie finished with 5/79.

Lawry and Stackpole started off cautiously for Australia against paceman Syed Abid Ali and the spin attack. Resuming after a rest day, Stackpole reached his century at tea, and his team 322/7 by the end of the day's play. Wickets fell in quick succession the following morning, day four, to India's spinners and were all out 345. Prasanna picked five wickets, while Bedi picked three and Venkataraghavan, two.

India's top-order was dismissed cheaply in the team's innings, with Gleeson picking four of the five wickets. Post-lunch Gleeson managed to dismiss Pataudi for a duck and Chandu Borde for 8 reducing India to 59/5. Only Wadekar could offer any resistance and went on to bat for three-and-a half hours scoring 46 runs. The last hour of the day's play was marred by violence by a section of the crowd, in disapproval of umpire Sambhu Pan's decision when he declared Venkataraghavan out caught by wicket-keeper Brian Taber off Alan Connollys delivery. Play was however allowed to carry on despite bottles being hurled on the ground and chairs and canvas coverings being set on fire. The scorers request to abandon play for the day, for reasons that they could not see the signals of the on-field umpires and that they were "blinded" by smoke, was denied, when the score was 120/8. Later, the score kept by the All India Radio (AIR) commentators' box of the rest of the day's play which ended at 125/9 was accepted by the captains of the two teams. A. A. Jasdenwala, President of the Cricket Club of India that owns the stadium, decided to ban radio commentary for the following day holding one of the commentators responsible for instigating the violence. He revoked following an appeal by the AIR. India added 12 runs to the total the following morning before the final wicket fell. Set with a target of 64 in 283 minutes, Australia lost their openers for 13 runs. Australia reached the target a few minutes after lunch with Chappell and Doug Walters at the crease.

=== Second Test ===
15–20 November
Scorecard

India	v	Australia
320 (145.5 overs); Farokh Engineer 77; Alan Connolly 4/91 (36 overs)		348 (166.2 overs); Paul Sheahan 114; Srinivasaraghavan Venkataraghavan 3/76 (37 overs)
312/7d (152 overs); Gundappa Viswanath 137; Graham McKenzie 3/63 (34 overs)		95/0 (44 overs); Bill Lawry 56*; Ashok Mankad 0/0 (1 over); Ajit Wadekar 0/0 (1 over)

Match drawn
Green Park, Kanpur
Umpires: Ahmed Mamsa (Ind) and B. Satyaji Rao (Ind)

- India won the toss and elected to bat.
- Gundappa Viswanath made his Test debut.
- 17 November was a rest day.

Going into the game, India made four changes: batsmen Borde and Sardesai, and bowlers Surti and Abid Ali were dropped for Eknath Solkar and debutante Gundappa Viswanath, and Subrata Guha, Ashok Gandotra respectively, while including Ambar Roy as the twelfth man. Australia retained the team from the first Test. India captain Pataudi won the toss and opted to bat first. Mankad and Engineer got the team off to a strong start completing a 100-run partnership in 96 minutes, first for the team since January 1967. An aggressive Engineer was dismissed caught and bowled by Stackpole off his first ball, after making 77, which included 12 fours. Mankad scored his half-century when he cut Gleeson for a four after lunch, before getting out in similar manner for an Ashley Mallett delivery. Viswanath followed him without scoring a run. Including Viswanath, Alan Connolly dismissed Wadekar and Gandotra, in a display characterized by accuracy, reducing India to 197/5. India batted to stumps without further loss, ending at 237/5. On resumption of play the following day, India lost wickets at regular intervals including Pataudi in the second over to Graham McKenzie, and the lower-order to Connolly and Ashley Mallett before winding up at 320. Australia's first innings began with a 48-run stand for the first wicket before Lawry was caught at short leg by Solkar off Venkataraghavan. Stackpole was run out for 40 a few minutes later before Chappell was done in by a topspinner off Venkataraghavan. Australia closed at stumps on 105/3.

An aggressive Doug Walters struck 8 fours before losing his leg stump to a delivery from Bedi that straightened, the morning after a rest day, after he made 54. Ian Redpath, and Paul Sheahan, who till had had an ordinary tour, put on 131 for the fourth wicket. Scoring at a-run-a-minute, the innings of both batsmen were marked by strokeplays, hitting 11 and 20 fours respectively, while batting for three hours together. Sheahan reached his maiden Test century before being dismissed for 114. The tail quickly followed before the side were all out for 348, with a lead of 28 runs, when stumps were drawn. India's openers showed no trouble against Australia's pacemen McKenzie and Connolly, following which captain Lawry introduced spinner Gleeson. Mankad continued after Engineer dismissed for 21. He was bowled by a yorker off McKenzie after making 68 in 202 minutes; the latter also dismissed Pataudi in his next over for a duck reducing India to 125/4. Solkar and Viswanath struck a partnership and batted India to stumps. Viswanath reached his century the following morning, becoming only the sixth to score one on debut. It was characterized by "sound technique, mature judgement, superb footwork and wristy strokeplay." He batted for 354 minutes and the innings included 25 fours. His partner Solkar made 35, before the captain declared at 312/7 setting Australia a target of 285 runs in 130 minutes. Openers Lawry and Stackpole batted a full 130 minutes without losing a wicket, thus drawing the match.

=== Third Test ===
28 November–2 December
Scorecard

Australia	v	India
296 (119.4 overs); Ian Chappell 138; Bishan Singh Bedi 4/71 (42 overs)		223 (108.3 overs); Ashok Mankad 97; Ashley Mallett 6/64 (32.3 overs)
107 (58.2 overs); Bill Lawry 49*; Bishan Singh Bedi 5/37 (23 overs)		181/3 (80.4 overs); Ajit Wadekar 91*; Ashley Mallett 2/60 (29 overs)

India won by 7 wickets
Feroz Shah Kotla, Delhi
Umpires: I. Gopalakrishnan (Ind) and Samar Roy (Ind)

- Australia won the toss and elected to bat.
- 1 December was a rest day.
- This was the first Test played in India to be televised.

On 27 November, an agreement was reached between the Television Centre and the Delhi & District Cricket Association (DDCA), and it was decided that the match would be televised, the first for a Test played in India. According to the agreement, the centre was to pay the DDCA ₹2,000 per match-day. The wicket was described as "bald and barren" and "tailor-made for batsmen", and that spinners would play a "decisive role". Prior to the match, Australia captain Lawry had said that if he won the toss his team would win the match and that he hoped it would rain if he lost the toss. He added that he hoped to go fishing before scheduled close of the match, to which India captain Pataudi responded saying the former "will have [no] time" for it.

Australia won the toss and opted to bat first. India included Ambar Roy in place of Ashok Gandotra. Australia started off strongly making 28 runs in 20 minutes, which included Stackpole's 3 fours off Subrata Guha. Guha struck in his fourth over, minutes later, when he bowled Lawry out as he tried to drive him. Chappell settled down quickly before Bedi and EAS Prasanna were brought into the attack. Chappell edged a turning delivery off Prasanna to Solkar at backward short leg when he was on 12, but was put down. Australia went to lunch at 84/1. They lost their second wicket in Stackpole at 100, who was stumped off Bedi. His 61 off 145 minutes included 7 fours and 1 five. While Chappell reached his half-century in 162 minutes, two wickets fell at the other end in the form of Walters and Redpath and later Sheahan, reducing his team score to 133/5. Chappell and Taber, the new batsman, went to tea without losing their wickets. A few minutes after tea, Chappell completed his fourth century and second against India, coming in 231 minutes. He put on 118 for the sixth wicket with Taber before losing his wicket to Bedi for 138. Mallet followed him after a few minutes and the team went to stumps at 261/7. The remaining wickets fell quickly the following morning and were all out at 296.

A century from Ian Chappell took Australia to 296, and then Ashley Mallett spun India out for 223, taking 6-64. However, Bishan Bedi and EAS Prasanna then took five wickets each in Australia's innings and had the tourists out for just 107, leaving India with a target of 181 for victory. Ajit Wadekar's 91 set up India's victory by seven wickets, which saw the series locked at 1-1 going into the fourth and Fifth Tests.

=== Fourth Test ===
12–16 December
Scorecard

India	v	Australia
212 (96.4 overs); Gundappa Vishwanath 54; Graham McKenzie 6/67 (33.4 overs)		335 (143.1 overs); Ian Chappell 99; Bishan Singh Bedi 7/98 (50 overs)
161 (77.1 overs); Ajit Wadekar 62; Alan Connolly 4/31 (16.1 overs)		42/0 (5 overs); Keith Stackpole 25*

Australia won by 10 wickets
Eden Gardens, Calcutta
Umpires: Sambhu Pan (Ind) and Judah Reuben (Ind)

- Australia won the toss and elected to field.
- 15 December was a rest day.

The fourth Test started on 12 December and Australia won the toss, electing to field. McKenzie took 6-67 for Australia and ensured India's dismissal for 212. Half-centuries from Chappell and Doug Walters gave Australia a lead of 123, Bedi's 7-98 preventing a bigger Australian lead. In the second innings, Alan Connolly and Eric Freeman helped remove India for 161 and Australia needed only 42 for victory; they won by 10 wickets. Six people were killed and thirty were injured when police fired into a crowd who rushed the ticket counters before the start of the fourth day.

=== Fifth Test ===
24–28 December
Scorecard

Australia	v	India
258 (115.2 overs); Doug Walters 102; Srinivasaraghavan Venkataraghavan 4/71 (34 overs)		163 (62.4 overs); Mansoor Ali Khan Pataudi 59; Ashley Mallett 5/91 (25 overs)
153 (80.5 overs); Ian Redpath 63; EAS Prasanna 6/74 (31 overs)		171 (85.2 overs); Gundappa Viswanath 59; Ashley Mallett 5/53 (29.2 overs)

Australia won by 77 runs
Madras Cricket Club, Madras
Umpires: I. Gopalakrishnan (Ind) and B. Satyaji Rao (Ind)

- Australia won the toss and elected to bat.
- Mohinder Amarnath (Ind) made his Test debut.
- 26 December was a rest day.

The fifth Test began on 24 December with India needing a victory to draw the series. Batting first, Australia made 258, largely through Walters's 102, and then dismissed India for 163. However, an Indian fightback in the second innings saw Australia reduced to 6/24 at one point before Ian Redpath rescued the innings for Australia, scoring 63. Australia were all out for 153, setting India 249 for victory. Mallett took his second five-for in the match and helped Australia dismiss India for 171, Australia winning by 77 runs.

Ashley Mallett ended up being the leading wicket taker of the series with 28 wickets at an average of 19.10; the second most successful bowler was Bishan Bedi with 21 at 20.57. The leading run scorer was India's GR Viswanath with 334 runs at 47.71; Australia's Ian Chappell was the next most successful batsmen with 324 runs at 46.28.

== Aftermath ==
The tour was to be Australia's last successful series in India until victory under Ricky Ponting and Adam Gilchrist in 2004-05. Between those series, Australia were unsuccessful on tours in 1979-80, 1996–97, 1997–98, and 2000–01; the 1986-87 tour was drawn 0–0 with the First Test a tie. India turned out to rebound from the loss by winning its next two series in the West Indies and England; they were its first series wins in those countries. Because Australia were scheduled for a tour to South Africa immediately after this series, they flew straight to South Africa for a four Test series without returning home.

== External sources ==
- Ceylon itinerary
- India itinerary
