= English cricket team in India in 1963–64 =

International cricket tour

- Date: 3 January – 24 February 1964
- Location: India
- Result: 5-Test series, 0-0 draw
Teams
- India: England
Captains
- Mansoor Ali Khan Pataudi: M. J. K. Smith
Most runs
- Budhi Kunderan (525) Dilip Sardesai (449) M. L. Jaisimha (444): Brian Bolus (391); Colin Cowdrey (309); M. J. K. Smith (306)
Most wickets
- Salim Durani (11) B. S. Chandrasekhar (10) Bapu Nadkarni (9): Fred Titmus (27); John Price (14); Don Wilson (9)

A cricket team from England organised by the Marylebone Cricket Club (MCC) toured India from 3 January to 24 February 1964. They played five Test matches, all of which were drawn, against the India national cricket team, along with other matches against domestic Indian clubs. In the Test matches, the side was known as "England"; in other matches, it was known as "MCC". The first Test of the series, at Madras, was the 400th Test match to be played by England.

== Touring team ==
- Mike Smith (captain)
- Ken Barrington
- Jimmy Binks
- Brian Bolus
- Colin Cowdrey
- John Edrich
- Jeff Jones
- Barry Knight
- David Larter
- John Mortimore
- Peter Parfitt
- Jim Parks
- John Price
- Phil Sharpe
- Micky Stewart
- Fred Titmus
- Don Wilson

The manager was David Clark.

=== 1st Test ===
10 – 15 January
scorecard

India	v	England
457/7 dec. (162.0 overs); Budhi Kunderan 192; Fred Titmus 5–116 (50.0 overs)		317 (190.4 overs); Brian Bolus 88; Chandu Borde 5–88 (67.4 overs)
152/9 dec. (58.5 overs); Budhi Kunderan 38; Fred Titmus 4–46 (19.5 overs)		241/5 (87.0 overs); John Mortimore 73*; Bapu Nadkarni 2–6 (6.0 overs)

Match drawn
Nehru Stadium, Madras, India
Umpires: Sunil Banerjee and I. Gopalakrishnan

=== 2nd Test ===
21 – 26 January
scorecard

India	v	England
300 (113.3 overs); Salim Durani 90; John Price 3–66 (19.0 overs)		233 (130.0 overs); Fred Titmus 84*; B.S. Chandrasekhar 4–67 (40.0 overs)
249/8 dec. (115.0 overs); Dilip Sardesai 66; M. L. Jaisimha 66; Fred Titmus 3–79 (46.0 overs)		206/3 (134.0 overs); Brian Bolus 57; Salim Durani 1–35 (29.0 overs)

Match drawn
Brabourne Stadium, Bombay, India
Umpires: Habib Choudhury and Ahmed Mamsa

=== 3rd Test ===
29 January – 3 February
scorecard

India	v	England
241 (85.2 overs); Dilip Sardesai 54; John Price 5–73 (23.0 overs)		267 (148.5 overs); Colin Cowdrey 107; Ramakant Desai 4–62 (22.5 overs)
300/7 dec. (120.0 overs); M. L. Jaisimha 129; David Larter 2–27 (8.0 overs)		145/2 (55.0 overs); M. J. K. Smith 75*; Salim Durani 1–15 (8.0 overs)

Match drawn
Eden Gardens, Calcutta, India
Umpires: M. V. Nagendra and Samar Roy

=== 4th Test ===
8 – 13 February
scorecard

India	v	England
344 (148.0 overs); Hanumant Singh 105; John Mortimore 3–74 (38.0 overs)		451 (185.3 overs); Colin Cowdrey 151; B. S. Chandrasekhar 3–79 (34.3 overs)
463/4 (165.0 overs); Mansoor Ali Khan Pataudi 203*; Don Wilson 2–74 (41.0 overs)

Match drawn
Feroz Shah Kotla, Delhi, India
Umpires: Sambhu Pan and B Satyaji Rao

=== 5th Test ===
15 – 20 February
scorecard

England	v	India
559/8 dec. (203.0 overs); Barry Knight 127; M. L. Jaisimha 2–54 (19.0 overs)		266 (182.1 overs); Dilip Sardesai 79; Fred Titmus 6–73 (60.0 overs)
		347/3 (133.0 overs) (f/o); Bapu Nadkarni 122*; Jim Parks, Jr. 1–43 (6.0 overs)

Match drawn
Modi Stadium, Kanpur, India
Umpires: Sukken Bhattacharya and S. K. Raghunatha Rao

== Other matches ==
=== Indian Board president's XI v Marylebone Cricket Club ===
3 – 5 January
scorecard

MCC	v	Indian Board President's XI
272/3 dec. (79.5 overs); Micky Stewart 119; E. A. S. Prasanna 1–42 (16.0 overs)		298/4 dec. (105.0 overs); Prakash Poddar 100*; Barry Knight 1–36 (14.0 overs)
259/6 (92.0 overs); Micky Stewart 82; Sadanand Mohol 2–30 (28.0 overs)

Match drawn
Central College Ground, Bangalore, India
Umpires: V. Rajagopal and B. Satyaji Rao

=== South Zone v. Marylebone Cricket Club ===
7 – 9 January
scorecard

South Zone	v	MCC
140 (53.2 overs); Habib Ahmed 29; Don Wilson 4–28 (15.0 overs)		480 (107.5 overs); Don Wilson 112; Habib Khan 3–109 (29.0 overs)
313 (85.0 overs); P. K. Belliappa 104; Fred Titmus 3–63 (20.0 overs)

Marylebone Cricket Club won by an innings and 27 runs
Lal Bahadur Shastri Stadium, Hyderabad, India
Umpires: Rathin Bose and Judah Reuben

== Notes ==
- Playfair Cricket Annual 1964
- Wisden Cricketers Almanack 1965
