= Devraj Puri =

Indian cricketer (born 1916)

Personal information
- Born: 12 March 1916; Lahore, India
- Died: 31 December 1971 (aged 55); Delhi, India
- Batting: Right-handed
- Bowling: Right-arm fast-medium

Domestic team information
- Years: Team
- 1934/35–1944/45: Northern India
- 1941/42–1946/47: Bengal
- 1947/48: Delhi
- 1952/53: Uttar Pradesh

Career statistics
| Competition | FC |
|---|---|
| Matches | 18 |
| Runs scored | 274 |
| Batting average | 13.04 |
| 100s/50s | 0/1 |
| Top score | 58 |
| Balls bowled | 2,459 |
| Wickets | 54 |
| Bowling average | 20.48 |
| 5 wickets in innings | 2 |
| 10 wickets in match | 1 |
| Best bowling | 6/28 |
| Catches/stumpings | 14/– |
- Source: CricketArchive, 13 May 2021

Devraj Puri (12 March 1916 – 31 December 1971) was an Indian cricketer and commentator. He played first-class cricket for several teams including Bengal and Delhi. He played one unofficial Test match for India against the Australians in 1935-36. After his playing career, he became a cricket commentator. In contemporary reports, his name often appears as Dev Raj Puri or D. R. Puri.

== Biography ==
Devraj Puri was a bowler who was considered very fast in his early overs. He made his debut in first class cricket for Northern India in the first season of the Ranji Trophy. In his second match, he returned figures 4-1-3-3 as Southern Punjab were bowled out for 22 runs; it would remain the lowest team score in the tournament for more than 70 years. He took 6 wickets for 101 runs in the final against Bombay but Northern Punjab lost by 208 runs. In the 1935–36 season, Puri captained Punjab University to a win in the interuniversity Rohinton Baria Trophy.

Puri opened the bowling with Mohammad Nissar against the touring Australians in the third unofficial Test at Lahore in January 1936. A match report tells that Puri took a run-up of over 30 yards and "appeared to be faster than Nissar" but without the same control. He was not selected for the 1936 tour of England. According to his son Narottam Puri, Devraj Puri was invited for the trials in Delhi but not allowed to bowl a single ball apparently because he had played a few matches for the Maharaja of Patiala. Patiala was an adversary of the Maharajkumar of Vizianagram who was the captain of the touring side.

All India Radio invited Puri to do the radio commentary for the Delhi Test of the 1948-49 series against West Indies on the recommendation of the Nawab of Pataudi. He continued to be a commentator for twenty years. In the Bombay Test against Australia in November 1969, Puri criticised umpire Sambhu Pan's decision to give S. Venkataraghavan out. Several spectators were carrying transistor radios and Puri's comments contributed in inflaming a crowd riot. A part of the Brabourne Stadium was set on fire.

The Devraj Puri Trophy that was given for the North Zone winners in the Ranji Trophy was named after him. His son Narottam became a cricket commentator on radio and television.
