= West Indian cricket team in India and Ceylon in 1966–67 =

International cricket tour

	India	West Indies
- Dates: 13 December 1966 – 18 January 1967
Captains	MAK Pataudi	GS Sobers

Test series
- Result: West Indies won the 3-match series 2–0
Most runs	CG Borde (345)	GS Sobers (342)
Most wickets	BS Chandrasekhar (18)	LR Gibbs (18)

The West Indian cricket team toured India and Ceylon in December 1966 and January 1967 to play a three-match Test series against the Indian national cricket team. West Indies won the Test series 2–0. India were captained by Mansoor Ali Khan Pataudi and West Indies by Garfield Sobers. In January, the West Indians played a first-class rated international against the Ceylon national cricket team at the Paikiasothy Saravanamuttu Stadium, Colombo. The match was drawn. Ceylon were captained by Michael Tissera.

== Test series summary ==
=== First Test ===
13–18 December 1966
(5-day match)
Scorecard

India	v	West Indies
296 (109.4 overs); CG Borde 121; GS Sobers 3/46 (25 overs)		421 (161.5 overs); CC Hunte 101; BS Chandrasekhar 7/157 (61.5 overs)
316 (111.5 overs); BK Kunderan 79; LR Gibbs 4/67 (24.5 overs)		192/4 (64.1 overs); CH Lloyd 78*; BS Chandrasekhar 4/78 (31 overs)

West Indies won by 6 wickets
Brabourne Stadium, Bombay
Umpires: AM Mamsa and B Satyaji Rao

- India won the toss and elected to bat.
- 16 December was taken as a rest day.
- AL Wadekar (IND) and CH Lloyd (WIN) made their Test debuts.

=== Second Test ===
31 December 1966 – 5 January 1967
(5-day match)
Scorecard

West Indies	v	India
390 (138 overs); RB Kanhai 90; BS Chandrasekhar 3/107 (46 overs)		167 (85.5 overs); BK Kunderan 39; LR Gibbs 5/51 (37 overs)
		178 (f/o) (77.4 overs); Hanumant Singh 37; GS Sobers 4/56 (20 overs)

West Indies won by an innings and 45 runs
Eden Gardens, Calcutta
Umpires: I Gopalakrishnan and SP Pan

- West Indies won the toss and elected to bat.
- 2 January was taken as a rest day.
- There was no play on the second day due to riots in the stadium.
- BS Bedi (IND) made his Test debut.

=== Third Test ===
13–18 January 1967
(5-day match)
Scorecard

India	v	West Indies
404 (143.2 overs); CG Borde 125; LR Gibbs 3/87 (46 overs)		406 (132 overs); GS Sobers 95; BS Chandrasekhar 4/130 (46 overs)
323 (105.4 overs); AL Wadekar 67; CC Griffith 4/61 (14 overs)		270/7 (93 overs); GS Sobers 74*; BS Bedi 4/81 (28 overs)

Match drawn
Madras Cricket Club Ground, Madras
Umpires: SK Raghunatha Rao and S Roy

- India won the toss and elected to bat.
- 16 January was taken as a rest day.
