= Mukundapur (disambiguation) =

Mukundapur is a town in Gaidakot Municipality in the eastern part of Nawalparasi District in the Lumbini Zone of southern Nepal.

Mukundapur may also refer to:

- Mukundapur, Chanditala-I, a village in Srirampore subdivision in Hooghly District, West Bengal, India
- Mukundpur, a village in Amarpatan tehsil, Satna District, Madhya Pradesh State, India
- Mukundapur, Kolkata, a neighbourhood in West Bengal, India

== See also ==
- Mukundapuram Taluk, a taluk (subdistrict) in Kerala, India
  - Mukundapuram (Lok Sabha constituency), Parliament of India
- Mukunda, a 2014 Indian film
  - Mukunda (soundtrack), by Mickey J. Meyer
- Mukunda (given name), an Indian male given name
- Mukund, alternative form of the given name
- Mukundan, alternative form of the given name
