= John Irvine =

John Irvine may refer to:

- John Irvine (journalist), Northern Irish ITN journalist
- John Irvine (priest) (1949–2025), dean of Coventry based at Coventry Cathedral, UK
- John J. Irvine (1852–?), railroad worker, engineer, and politician in Chattanooga, Tennessee
- Jack Irvine (John Alfred Irvine, 1912–1996), Canadian politician
- Jock Irvine (John Taylor Irvine, born 1944), Australian cricketer
- John Maxwell Irvine (1939–2012), British physicist

== See also ==
- John Irvin (born 1940), English film director
- John Irvine Hunter (1898–1924), Australian professor of anatomy
