= John Irwin =

John Irwin may refer to:

- John Irwin (academic) (1940–2019), American English professor at The Johns Hopkins University
- John Irwin (admiral) (1832–1901), United States Navy rear admiral
- John Irwin (baseball) (1861–1928), Canadian-born Major League Baseball player
- John Irwin (British Army officer) (1727/8–1788), British soldier, Commander-in-Chief of Ireland and Member of Parliament for East Grinstead, 1762–1783
- John Irwin (director), Irish film, television, and radio director, see Badger's Green
- John Irwin (politician) (1869–1948), Canadian politician, member of the Legislative Assembly of Alberta
- John Irwin (producer), American television producer, president of Irwin Entertainment
- John Irwin (writer), British writer, see The Big Fun Show
- John Keith Irwin (1929–2010), American sociologist known for his work on subcultures and on the prison system
- John N. Irwin (1844–1905), American politician, governor of Idaho Territory, 1883–1884, and Arizona Territory, 1890–1892
- John N. Irwin II (1913–2000), American Deputy Secretary of State and Ambassador to France, 1973–1974
- John Rice Irwin (born 1930), American cultural historian
- Jon Jo Irwin (born 1969), English boxer

== See also ==
- John Erwin (disambiguation)
- John Irvine (disambiguation)
