= Odedra =

Odedra is an Indian (Gujarati) surname. Notable people with the surname include:

- Meramanji Odedra (born 1976), International Actor
- Jay Odedra (born 1989), Omani cricketer
- Jayesh Odedra (born 1987), Indian cricketer
- Nilesh Odedra (born 1973), Indian cricketer
- Sonia Odedra (born 1988), English cricketer
- Yuvraj Odedra (born 1997), English cricketer

== See also ==
- Odedara
