= Mukund =

Mukund is an Indian name. Notable people with the name include:

== First name ==
- Mukund Lal Agrawal (1902–unknown), Indian politician
- Mukund Lath (1937–2020), Indian academic
- Mukund Parmar (born 1968), Indian cricketer
- Mukund Purohit (born 1971), Indian businessman
- Mukund Sathe (1937–2015), Indian cricketer
- Mukund Varadarajan, Indian officer

== Middle name ==
- Gopal Mukund Huddar (1902–1981), Indian anti-colonial activist and anti-fascist soldier
- Sanjay Mukund Kelkar, Indian politician

== Last name ==
- Abhinav Mukund (born 1990), Indian cricketer
- Madhavan Mukund, Indian academic

== See also ==
- Mukunda, a name for Vishnu
- Mukunda (given name), an Indian name, alternative transliteration of this name
