= Odedara =

Odedara is an Indian surname. Notable people with the surname include:

- Karsanbhai Odedara, Indian politician
- Karshan Odedara, Indian politician

== See also ==
- Odedra
