= Subrata Guha =

Indian cricketer

Personal information
- Born: 31 January 1946; Calcutta, Bengal, British India
- Died: 5 November 2003 (aged 57); Mumbai, Maharashtra, India
- Batting: Right-handed
- Bowling: Right-arm medium-fast

International information
- National side: India
- Test debut (cap 114): 8 June 1967 v England
- Last Test: 12 December 1969 v Australia

Career statistics
Competition	Tests	First-class
Matches	4	85
Runs scored	17	1067
Batting average	3.40	12.70
100s/50s	0/0	0/3
Top score	6	75
Balls bowled	674	6068
Wickets	3	299
Bowling average	103.66	20.29
5 wickets in innings	0	18
10 wickets in match	0	4
Best bowling	2/55	7/18
Catches/stumpings	2/–	45/–
- Source: Cricinfo

Subrata Guha (31 January 1946 – 5 November 2003) was an Indian cricketer who played in four Test matches between 1967 and 1969.

Guha was a medium-fast opening bowler. While he was a 20-year-old student at Calcutta University, he was largely responsible for inflicting the only defeat on the touring West Indians in 1966–67, when he took 4 for 64 and 7 for 49 for a combined Central and East Zones team. He was less successful on the subsequent tour of England, although he played in one of the Tests. He also had little success in three Tests against Australia in 1969–70. However, he continued to bowl successfully for Bengal in the Ranji Trophy, with 209 wickets at an average of 14.61, and best figures of 7 for 18 against Assam in 1972–73.

Guha worked for the State Bank of India. He and his wife Neelum married in 1971 and had two sons. One of their sons, Kunal, married the actress Nethra Raghuraman. Guha died suddenly of a heart attack in November 2003, aged 57.
