= John Price (cricketer, born 1937) =

English cricketer (born 1937)

Personal information
- Full name: John Sidney Ernest Price
- Born: 22 July 1937 (age 89); Harrow, Middlesex, England
- Batting: Left-handed
- Bowling: Right-arm fast-medium

International information
- National side: England
- Test debut: 21 January 1964 v India
- Last Test: 22 June 1972 v Australia

Domestic team information
- Years: Team
- 1961–1975: Middlesex

Career statistics
Competition	Test	First-class
Matches	15	279
Runs scored	66	1,108
Batting average	7.33	8.39
100s/50s	0/0	0/1
Top score	32	53*
Balls bowled	2,724	42,295
Wickets	40	817
Bowling average	35.02	23.52
5 wickets in innings	1	26
10 wickets in match	0	4
Best bowling	5/73	8/48
Catches/stumpings	7/–	103/–
- Source: ESPNcricinfo, 10 September 2022

John Sidney Ernest Price (born 22 July 1937) is an English former cricketer, who played in 15 Tests for England from 1964 to 1972. He played first-class cricket for Middlesex from 1961 to 1975.

Distinctive for his extremely long angled run up and elaborate, though graceful, upright bowling action, Price could bowl outswingers at genuine pace, but his international career was hampered by a succession of injuries. He possessed an excellent arm in the deep, but seldom troubled the opposition with a bat in his hand. He took 734 wickets for Middlesex in 242 matches at just 22.39 each, carrying their attack in the late 1960s, having only established himself in the first team in 1963 at the age of 25, after playing club cricket with Wembley Cricket Club. He also took 192 wickets in limited overs games.

== Life and career ==
Price was born in Harrow, Middlesex. He took 83 wickets at 22 in his first full season in 1963, earning a touring berth to India, where he took fourteen wickets in his first four Tests. Never renowned for his left-handed batting, he survived 144 minutes and scored 32 runs in partnership with his Middlesex team-mate, Fred Titmus, in the Second Test in Bombay. He took 5 for 73 in the next Test in Calcutta but, in his sporadic appearances thereafter, failed to take more than three wickets in a Test innings again.

He toured South Africa in 1964/65, taking three wickets in the Test at Johannesburg, but was struck down by a back injury in 1965. He returned to form and fitness in style in 1966, taking 94 wickets at 18.74 and bagging 8 for 48, the best bowling figures of his career, against Derbyshire at Lord's. After England had lost the 1966 series against the West Indies, Price, then considered the fastest bowler in England, was selected for the fifth and final Test, but was unable to play due to injury. John Snow, whom he had replaced, returned to the side. Price took another 89 wickets at just 16.51 in 1968, and although age was beginning to tell against him, he took another 80 scalps in 1970. He returned to England colours at the age of 34 in 1971, after six years in the international wilderness, against Pakistan, after Zaheer Abbas had earlier savaged England's bowling attack. Price took 3 for 29 in Pakistan's first innings, in a rain ruined match at Lord's, and he bowled well in the subsequent series against India, opening the bowling with Snow.

More good performances in 1972, including 8 for 85 against Sussex, and 6 for 34 in a Gillette Cup match against Surrey, saw him picked for what turned out to be his last Test, against Australia at Lord's, a game in which he hit 19, the second-highest score, in England's disastrous second innings, as Bob Massie swept the tourists to victory. Price appeared in the 1975 Benson & Hedges Cup Final, before retiring at the end of the season.
