= Alexander Irvine =

Alexander Irvine may refer to:

- Alexander C. Irvine, American fantasist and science fiction writer
- Derry Irvine, Baron Irvine of Lairg, British lawyer and political figure
- Alexander Irvine (knight), 15th century Laird of Drum Castle and Chief of Clan Irvine
- Alexander Irvine (MP), British Member of Parliament for East Looe
- Alexander Forbes Irvine of Drum FRSE
- Alexander Irwin, also spelled Irvine, British Army general
