= Ramesh Borde =

Indian cricketer (1952–2021)

Personal information
- Full name: Ramesh Gulabrao Borde
- Born: 22 February 1952; Pune, Maharashtra, India
- Died: 8 July 2021 (aged 69); Pune
- Relatives: Chandu Borde (brother)

Domestic team information
- Years: Team
- West Zone
- Maharashtra

Career statistics
Competition	FC	LA
Matches	42	2
Runs scored	1326	49
Batting average	25.50	49.00
100s/50s	2/7	0/0
Top score	124	45*
Balls bowled	3642	54
Wickets	42	1
Bowling average	34.92	52.00
5 wickets in innings	1	0
10 wickets in match	0	n/a
Best bowling	5/30	1/52
Catches/stumpings	20/0	1/0
- Source: Cricinfo, 9 July 2021

Ramesh Gulabrao Borde (22 February 1952 – 8 July 2021) was an Indian cricketer. He played 42 first-class matches and two List A matches between 1972–73 and 1984–85. His elder brother Chandu Borde was also a cricketer.

== Career ==
He made his first-class debut in 1972–73 domestic season for West Zone against Vidarbha where his elder brother Chandu Borde captained West Zone team. He was a regular feature for West Zone in Duleep Trophy between 1970s and 1980s. He also played for West Zone against the touring West Indies side in 1983–84 in Kolhapur. He played against Indian Board President's XI in two List A matches in 1982–83.

He also worked as a curator for Maharashtra Cricket Association and prepared pitches for the all three ODI matches between India and England in March 2021 at the MCA International Cricket Stadium.

== Death ==
He died on 8 July 2021 at the age of 69 due to heart attack.

== See also ==
- List of Maharashtra cricketers
- List of West Zone cricketers
