= John Erwin (disambiguation) =

John Erwin (1936–2024) was an American voice actor.

John Erwin may also refer to:

- John Patton Erwin (1795–1857), mayor of Nashville, Tennessee
- John Erwin (basketball) (1894–1972), American basketball coach

== See also ==
- John Irwin (disambiguation)
