= Kathi Irvine =

American ecological statistician

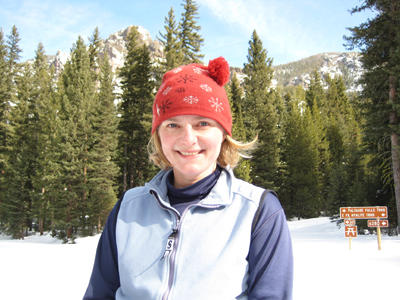
Irvine in 2011

Kathryn Mary (Kathi) Irvine is an American research statistician for the United States Geological Survey (USGS), affiliated with the Bozeman Environmental and Ecological Statistics Research Group, at the USGS Northern Rocky Mountain Science Center in Bozeman, Montana. Her research involves environmental statistics including both the fundamentals of spatial statistics and its application to wildlife populations including bats, pikas, elk, pine trees, and sagebrush steppes.

== Education and career ==
Irvine majored in biology at the University of North Carolina at Chapel Hill. She has a master's degree in ecology and environmental sciences from the University of Maine, and a second master's degree and PhD in statistics from Oregon State University, completed in 2007. Her dissertation, Graphical models for multivariate spatial data, was supervised by Alix Gitelman.

She became an assistant professor at Montana State University in 2008 before moving to the USGS in 2011. Beyond the USGS, she is a member of the core planning team of the North American Bat Monitoring Program, and maintains an affiliate faculty position in statistics at Montana State University.

== Service and recognition ==
Irvine was the 2018 chair of the American Statistical Association (ASA) Section on Statistics and the Environment, has been president of the Montana Chapter of the ASA several times, and has been publications chair for the ASA Section on Government Statistics. She was named a Fellow of the American Statistical Association in 2021.
