= Alan Irvine =

Alan Irvine may refer to:

- Alan Irvine (footballer, born 1958), former Everton and Crystal Palace player, and former manager of West Bromwich Albion
- Alan Irvine (footballer, born 1962), former Falkirk player and older brother of Brian Irvine
- Alan Irvine (designer), RDI-awarded for his exhibition and museum design
