= Ashok Gandotra =

Indian cricketer (born 1948)

Personal information
- Born: 24 November 1948 (age 77); Rio de Janeiro, Brazil
- Batting: Left-handed
- Bowling: Slow left-arm orthodox

International information
- National side: India
- Test debut (cap 122): 15 October 1969 v New Zealand
- Last Test: 15 November 1969 v Australia

Career statistics
Competition	Test	First-class
Matches	2	54
Runs scored	54	2,121
Batting average	13.50	28.66
100s/50s	0/0	2/12
Top score	18	169
Balls bowled	6	1,073
Wickets	0	21
Bowling average	–	26.71
5 wickets in innings	–	1
10 wickets in match	–	0
Best bowling	–	5/17
Catches/stumpings	1/–	34/–
- Source: CricketArchive, 5 February 2020

Ashok Gandotra (born 24 November 1948) is a former Indian cricketer who played in two Test matches in 1969.

Gandotra was born in Brazil where his father was posted in the foreign service, while the family was from Delhi. He played domestically for Delhi and Bengal.

== See also ==
- List of Test cricketers born in non-Test playing nations
