= Brian Irvine =

Brian Irvine may refer to:

- Brian Irvine (composer) (born 1965), Northern Irish composer
- Brian Irvine (cricketer), South African test cricketer
- Brian Irvine (footballer) (born 1965), Scottish international football player
