= Brian Taber =

Australian cricketer (1940–2023)

Personal information
- Full name: Hedley Brian Taber
- Born: 29 April 1940; Wagga Wagga, New South Wales
- Died: 21 July 2023 (aged 83); Bayview, New South Wales
- Batting: Right-handed
- Bowling: Leg break
- Role: Wicket-keeper

International information
- National side: Australia (1966–1970)
- Test debut (cap 240): 23 December 1966 v South Africa
- Last Test: 5 March 1970 v South Africa

Domestic team information
- Years: Team
- 1964/65–1973/74: New South Wales

Career statistics
Competition	Test	FC	LA
Matches	16	129	6
Runs scored	353	2,648	24
Batting average	16.04	18.01	4.80
100s/50s	0/0	1/8	0/0
Top score	48	109	11
Catches/stumpings	56/4	345/50	8/1
- Source: Cricinfo, 28 August 2019

Hedley Brian Taber (29 April 1940 – 21 July 2023) was an Australian cricketer who played in 16 Test matches as a wicket-keeper from 1966 to 1970. He represented New South Wales in domestic cricket.

Taber played 129 first-class matches with a career batting average of 18.01, a highest test score of 48, and a highest first-class score of 109. He retired from first-class cricket in 1974.

Taber remained involved in cricket, as both a coach and administrator for the New South Wales and national Under-19 teams. The best player award at the national Under-19 championships is named after Taber. He was inducted into the NSW Cricket Hall of Fame.
