= Jessie Irvine =

Jessie Irvine may refer to:

- Jessie Irvine (pickleball), American professional pickleball player
- Jessie Seymour Irvine, Scottish musical arranger
