= Andrew Irvine =

Andrew or Andy Irvine may refer to:

- Andrew Irvine (mountaineer) (1902–1924), English mountaineer
- Andy Irvine (musician) (born 1942), Irish folk musician
- Andy Irvine (rugby union) (born 1951), Scotland player and administrator
- Andrew David Irvine (born 1958), Canadian philosopher and educator
- Andrew Irvine (bassist) (born 1969), American bassist
