= Joseph Irvine =

English footballer

Personal information
- Position: Forward

Senior career*
| Years | Team | Apps | (Gls) |
| 1891–1892 | Accrington | 16 | (7) |
- * Club domestic league appearances and goals

Joseph Irvine was an English footballer who played in the Football League for Accrington.
