= Nagaraja Rao =

Indian cricketer and umpire (1914–2004)

Personal information
- Born: 1914; Shimoga, India
- Died: 3 April 2004 (aged 89–90)

Umpiring information
- ODIs umpired: 2 (1985–1986)
- Source: ESPNcricinfo, 26 May 2014

BR Nagaraja Rao (1914 – 3 April 2004) was an Indian cricketer and umpire. He stood in two One Day Internationals in 1985–1986.

== See also ==
- List of One Day International cricket umpires
