= Narottam Puri =

Indian sports journalist and broadcaster (born 1946)

- Born: 1946 (age 78–79); India
- Education: Delhi University

Narottam Puri (born 1946) is an Indian sports journalist and broadcaster.

Puri graduated from Maulana Azad Medical College New Delhi, and completed his master's degree in otorhinolaryngology (ENT), Delhi University. Presently, he is the Medical Advisor - Fortis Healthcare, Advisor (Health Services) - FICCI and Chairman - NABH Emeritus consultant (ENT) - Fortis Healthcare.

Puri is also a speaker on quality & safety, health insurance, medical tourism, medical strategy, & medical ethics. In 2013, he received FICCI's "Healthcare Personality of the Year" Award.
