= Edith Irvine =

American photographer

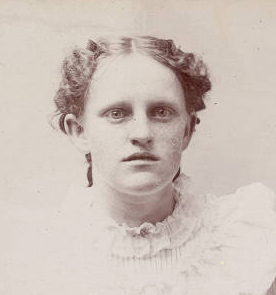
- Born: January 7, 1884; Calaveras County, California
- Died: August 14, 1949 (aged 65); Calaveras County, California
- Known for: Photography

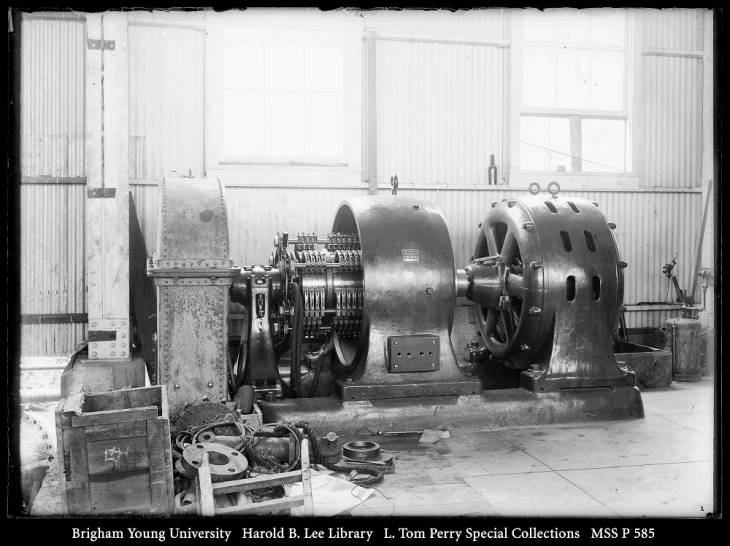
Electra Power House--D.C. Exciter

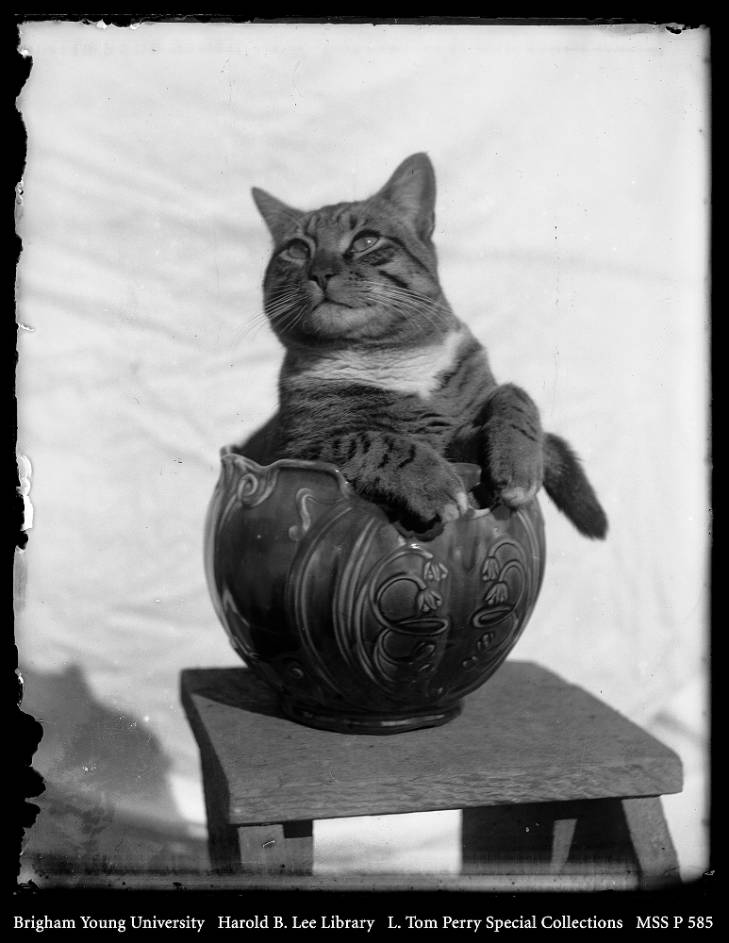
Cat in Bowl

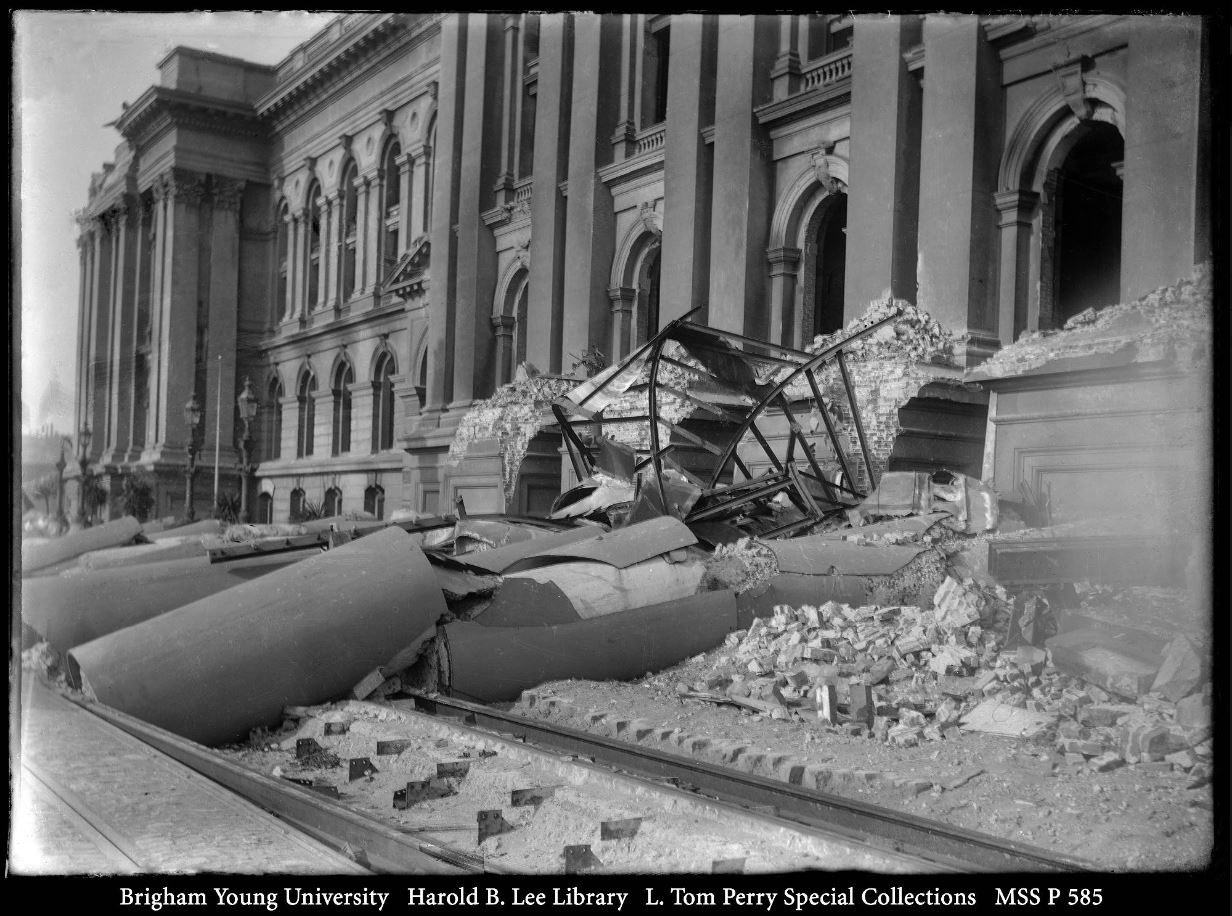
Back of City Hall after 1906 San Francisco Earthquake

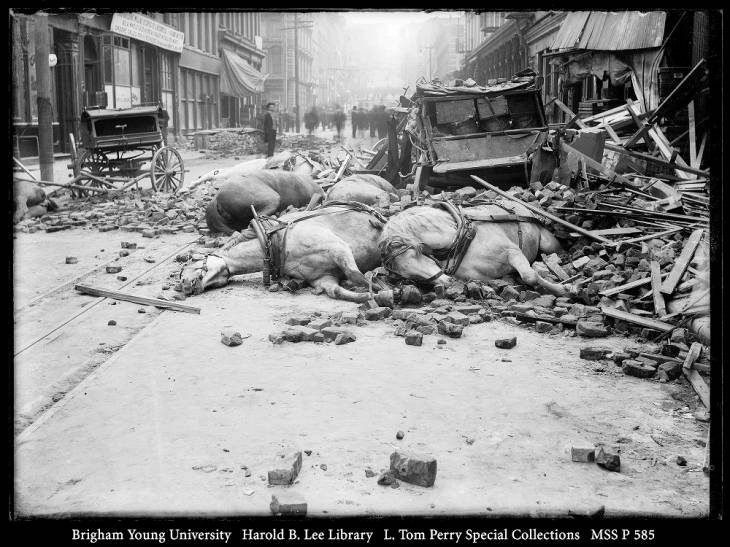
Dead Horses photograph by Edith Irvine

Lizzie Edith Irvine (7 January 1884 – 1949) was an American photographer who documented the 1906 San Francisco earthquake. Born into a wealthy family in Northern California, Irvine became interested in photography as a child and continued throughout her young adult life, photographing the progress of the Electra Power Project near her home. In 1906, Irvine happened to arrive in San Francisco just hours after the earthquake struck, and was able to take photographs of the aftermath despite the armed guards posted around the city trying to downplay the extent of the damage. In her later years, Irvine suffered from severe joint pains and became addicted to painkillers and alcohol. Following her death, her photographs were donated to the Brigham Young University Library in Provo, Utah.

== Early life ==
Edith Irvine was born in Sheep Ranch, Calaveras County, California to Thomas Hanna Irvine and Mary Irene (Hills) Irvine. At the time, her father was a gold miner and had been involved in real estate. Irvine was one of three children, one of whom died in infancy. The Irvine family moved around in the general area and eventually settled in Mokelumne Hill in 1900. Irvine was known for being "very smart," and likely was introduced to photography by Frank Peek, one of her classmates who was also interested in photography.

=== Family history in California ===
Edith's grandfather, William Irvine, had been born in Ireland as the youngest of nine children, and later traveled with his brother James to California during the gold rush. Both brothers found success in mining, and James joined the upper class in southern California and owned both the Irvine Ranch in Orange County and a produce and delivery business in San Francisco, and kept a residence in San Francisco at Folsom and Eleventh streets. Edith's grandfather, William, was also successful in his mining ventures and in real estate. He willed over $100,000 to his relatives through the liquidation of many of his properties, which was done after his death in 1886. Thomas Irvine, Edith's father, likely received money from the will in 1886. Wilma Plunkett indicates that the “family fortunes increased due to acquisitions of mines and other real estate,” and that the Irvine family became part of the “upper social strata of the area.”

== Photography ==
By her early teens, Irvine had created a darkroom in a rear corner of her family home in Mokelumne Hill. At age 14, she was photographing the extensive Electra Power Project—an early hydroelectric power project in California. This project, located near her home on the Mokelumne River, was completed in 1902 after four years of construction. According to family tradition, Standard Electric of California, later named Pacific Gas & Electric Company, hired her to photograph the project. No records have been found to substantiate this claim. Many of these photographs are housed in the Brigham Young University Library collection bearing her name. She became a member of the Eastern Star, the women's group of the Masonic Lodge, in 1912.

=== San Francisco earthquake ===
In 1906, at age 22, Irvine had made plans to take a year-long trip around the world. Irvine left from Stockton and arrived in San Francisco on April 18, 1906, just hours after the earthquake. Armed with a large supply of photographic materials, Irvine found an abandoned baby stroller and loaded her equipment in it, so as not to arouse suspicion from the armed guards stationed around the city. These guards were stationed around the city at the request of city government officials who were trying to conceal the magnitude of the damage, and the stroller allowed Irvine to move freely throughout the city and take photographs of what she came across. She remained in San Francisco for three days taking photos before returning to Mokelumne Hill, evidently forgoing her travels.

On the 1910 census, Irvine reported herself to be a professional photographer, but by 1920 she was working as a school teacher. She taught school until about 1931, when her declining health no longer permitted her to work. One of her former students characterized her as fair, but strict, and a good teacher.

== Health and later years ==
During her later years, Irvine suffered from a medical condition which caused her severe joint pains throughout her body. Given that her condition had never been properly diagnosed, Irvine's doctors decided to treat it with painkillers. Irvine became addicted to the painkillers and was later sent to a six-week drug rehabilitation program in San Francisco following a suicide attempt. Following her treatment, Irvine had a relapse and became an alcoholic as well, leading to another hospitalization. She also began losing her hearing at an early age and was nearly deaf by age 45.

Irvine and her brother Robert lived together most of their lives, as she never married and he did not marry until he was 60 years old. They continued to live together in the family home in Mokelumne Hill. Irvine never recovered from the medical and emotional problems that she suffered from in her later years. Not long after her brother, Bob, was granted legal guardianship for her on 8 June 1949, she died aged 65. In 1988, her small collection of photographs were donated to the Brigham Young University Library by her nephew, Jim Irvine, Bob's son.

== Subject matter ==
Irvine's black and white photograph Dead Horses attests to her photographic vision. At least four dead horses which were pulling carriages lie in their traces among broken carriages and brick rubble from the San Francisco earthquake of 1906. The L. Tom Perry Special Collections Library at Brigham Young University holds 293 images in their Irvine Collection. They range in subject matter from landscapes, construction, and bridges, to everyday life including family portraits, infant deaths and Mokelumne Hill townscapes. Her work includes much variety, from a redwood forest to city buildings, as well as the earthquake and its effect on architecture, streetscapes, fires, and prevailing activities amidst the destruction.

In 2005, five undiscovered photographs by Edith Irvine were found within a collection in southern California. They were all of San Francisco's 1906 earthquake and fire. Edith had visited the Irvine Ranch more than once during her lifetime and possibly gave them to the Irvine family. Subsequently, those photos plus the entire collection of 1906 earthquake photographs from James Irvine were published in a book: Two Weeks in San Francisco: The Story of the 1906 Earthquake and Fire. Until the publication of that book, a vast majority of Irvine's photographs had never been published.

== Gallery ==
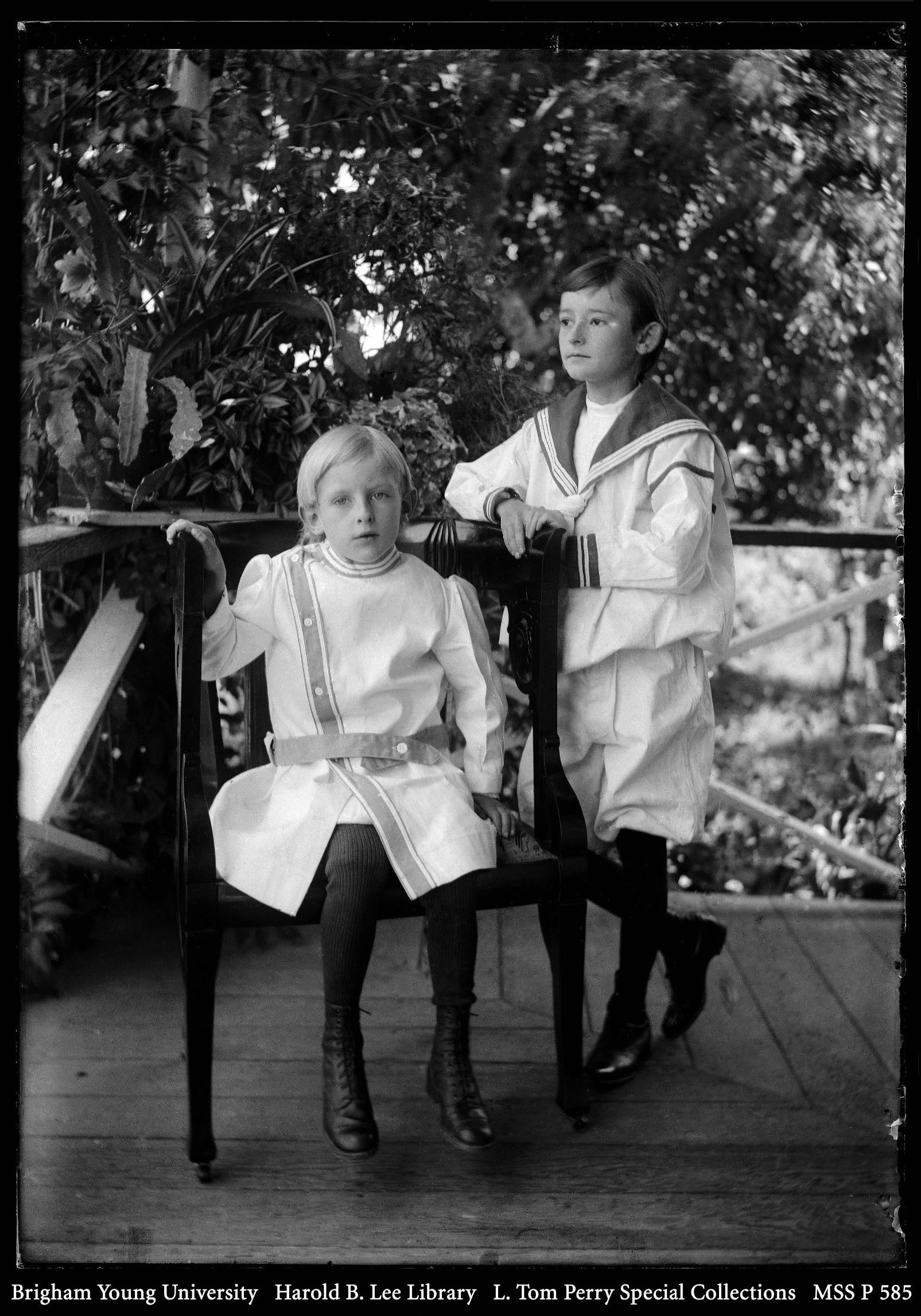
Bob and Friend, asi 1896

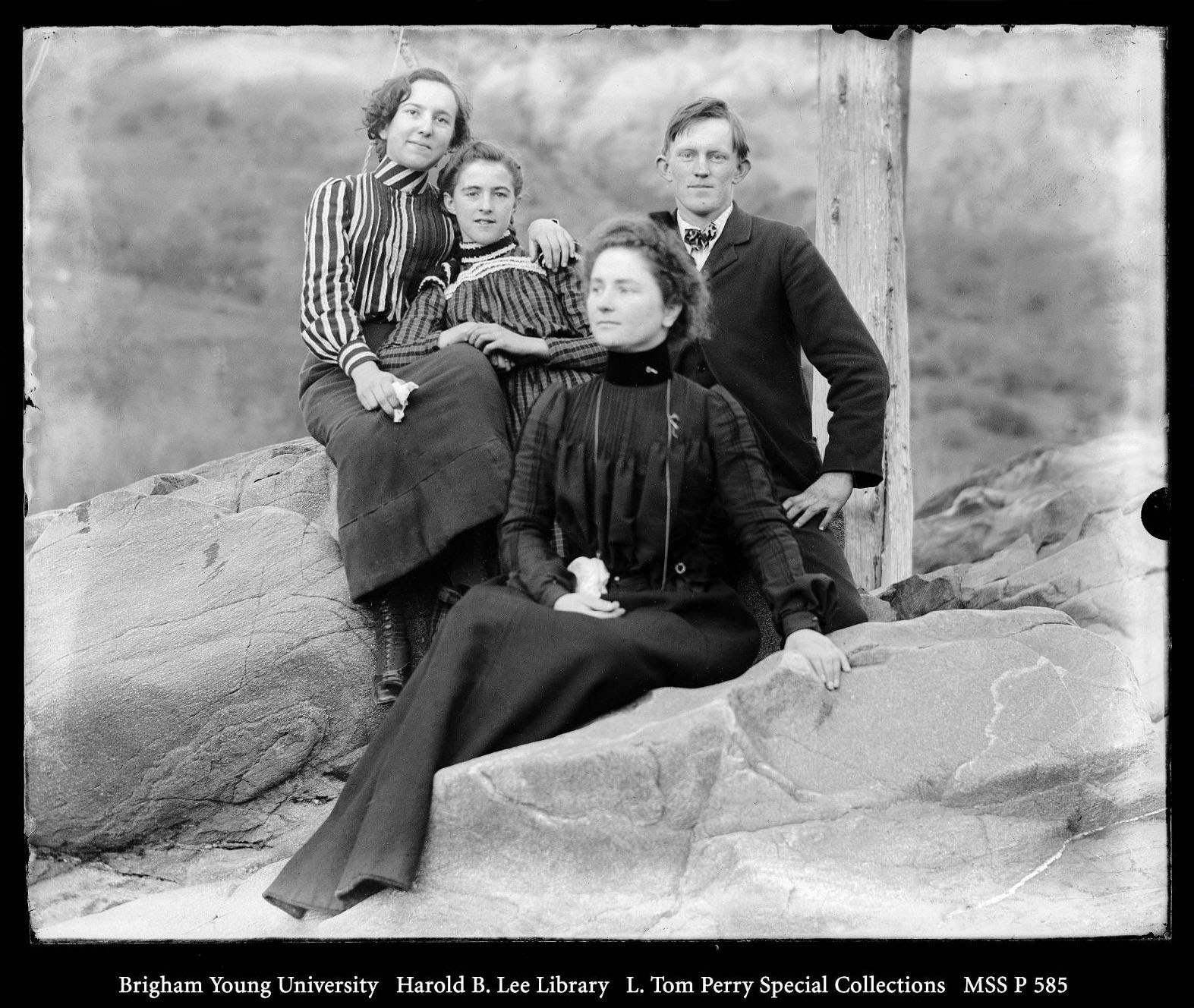
Bob and Friends, 1900–1931

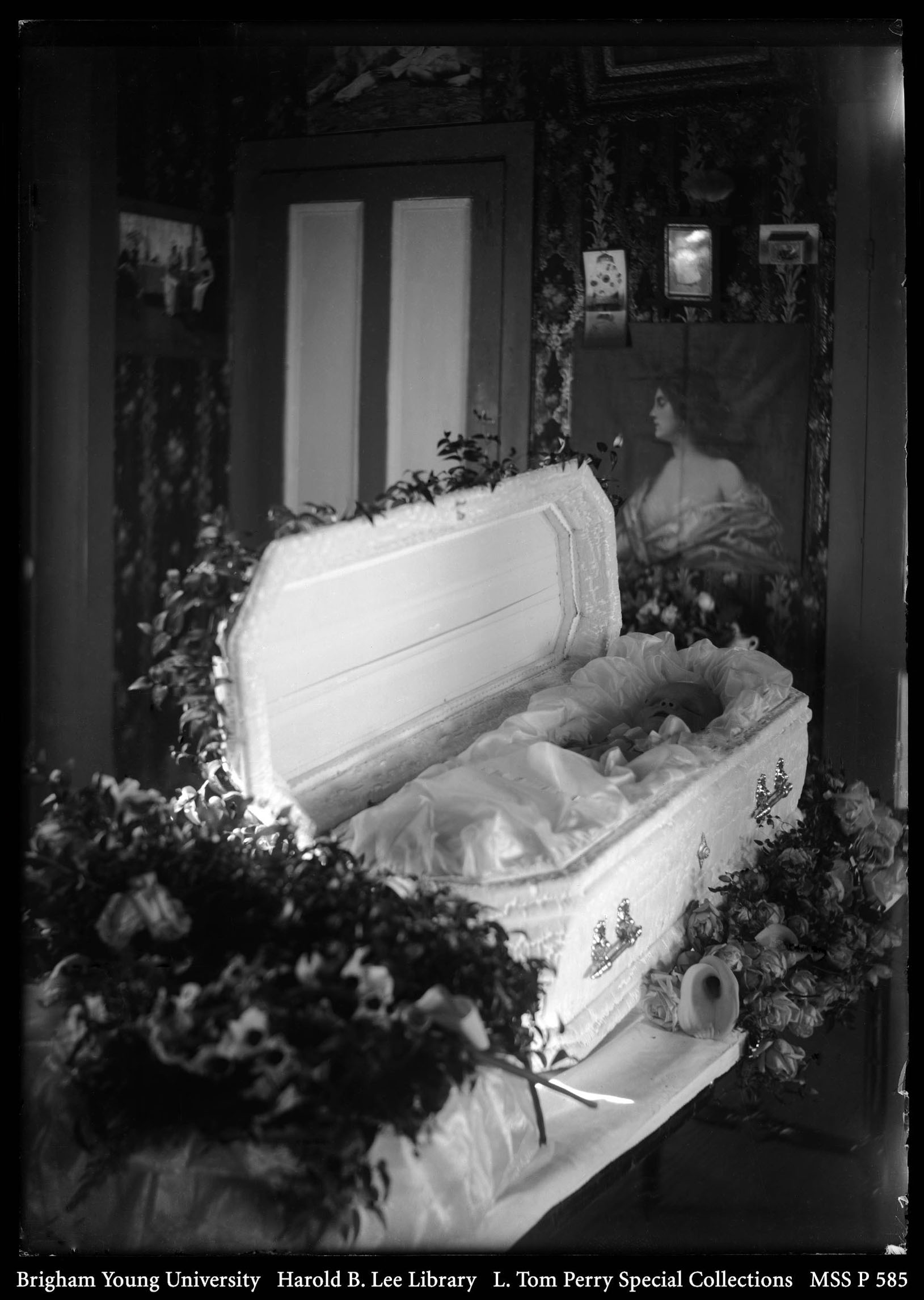
Baby in Casket, asi 1898

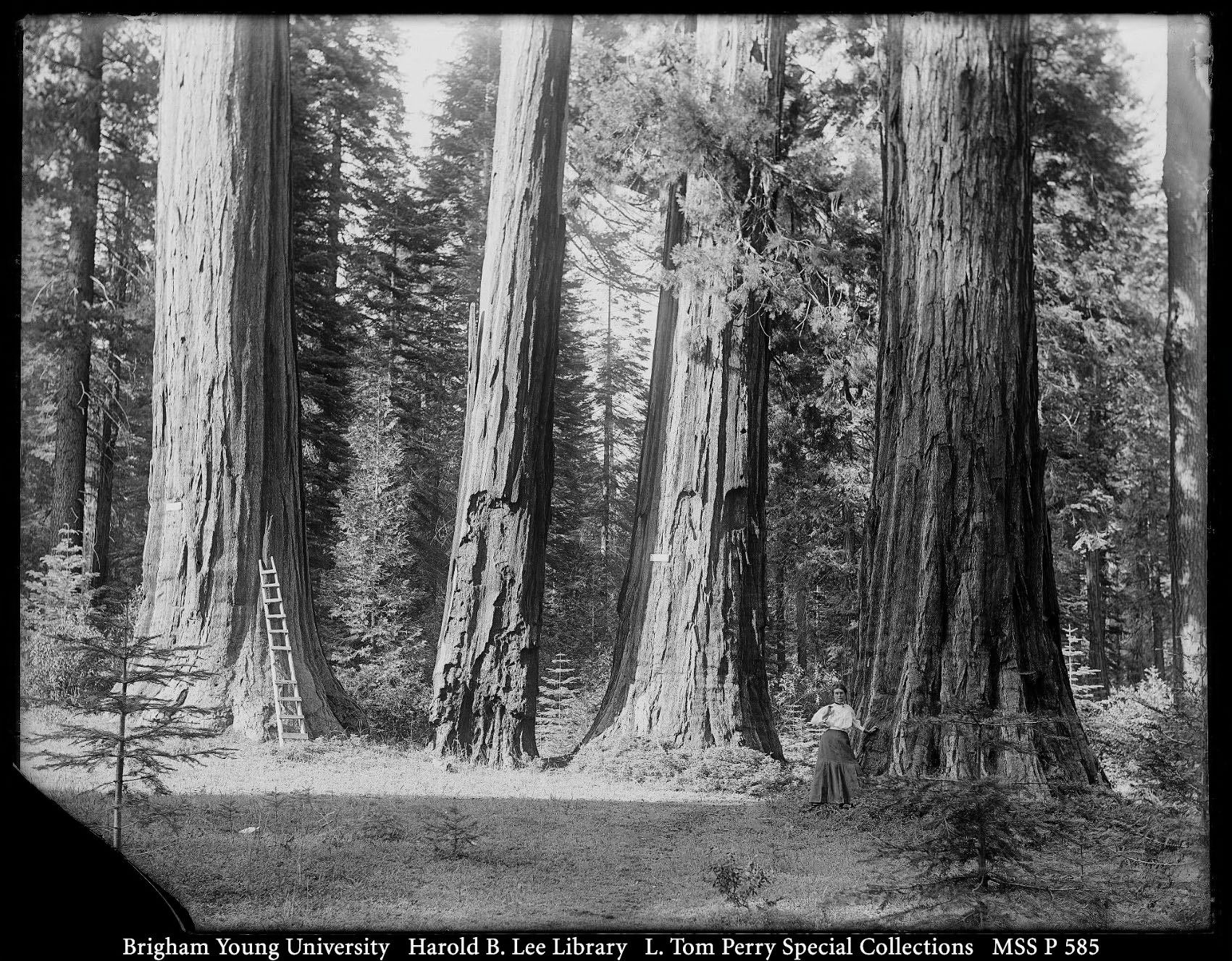
Calaveras Big Trees State Park, asi 1900

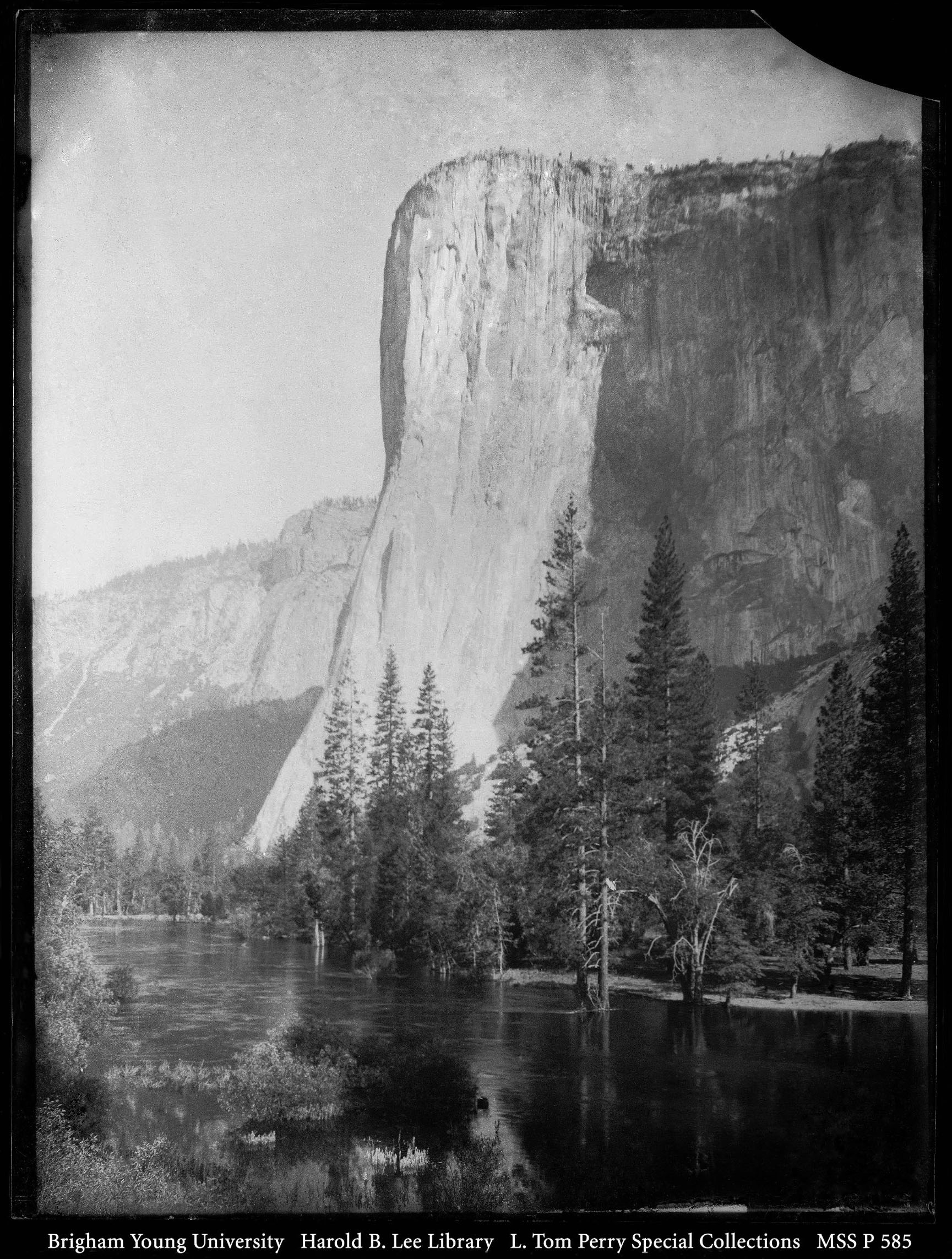
El Capitan Yosemite

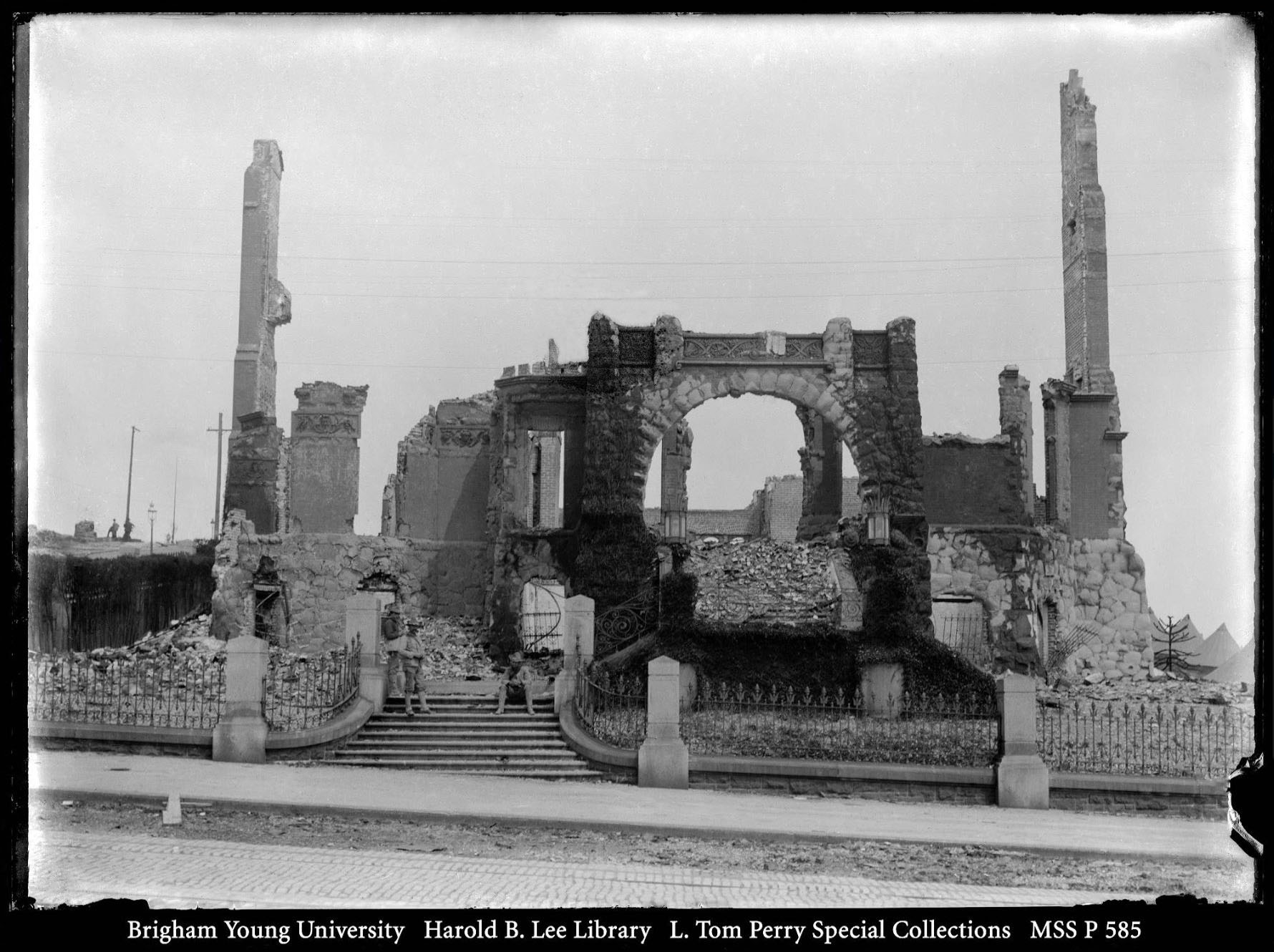
Charles Crocker Home after San Francisco Earthquake, 1906

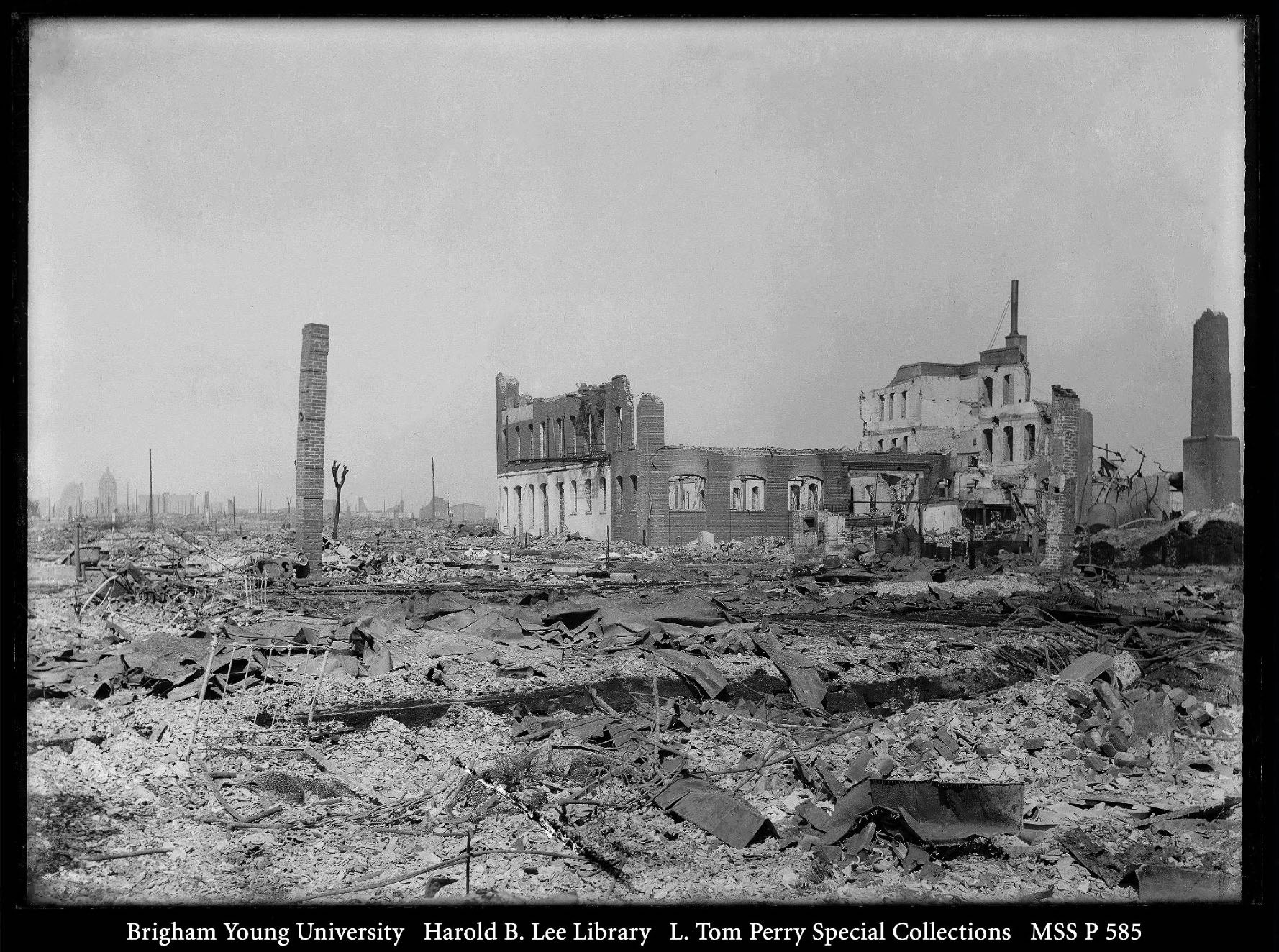
Chinatown after San Francisco Earthquake, 1906

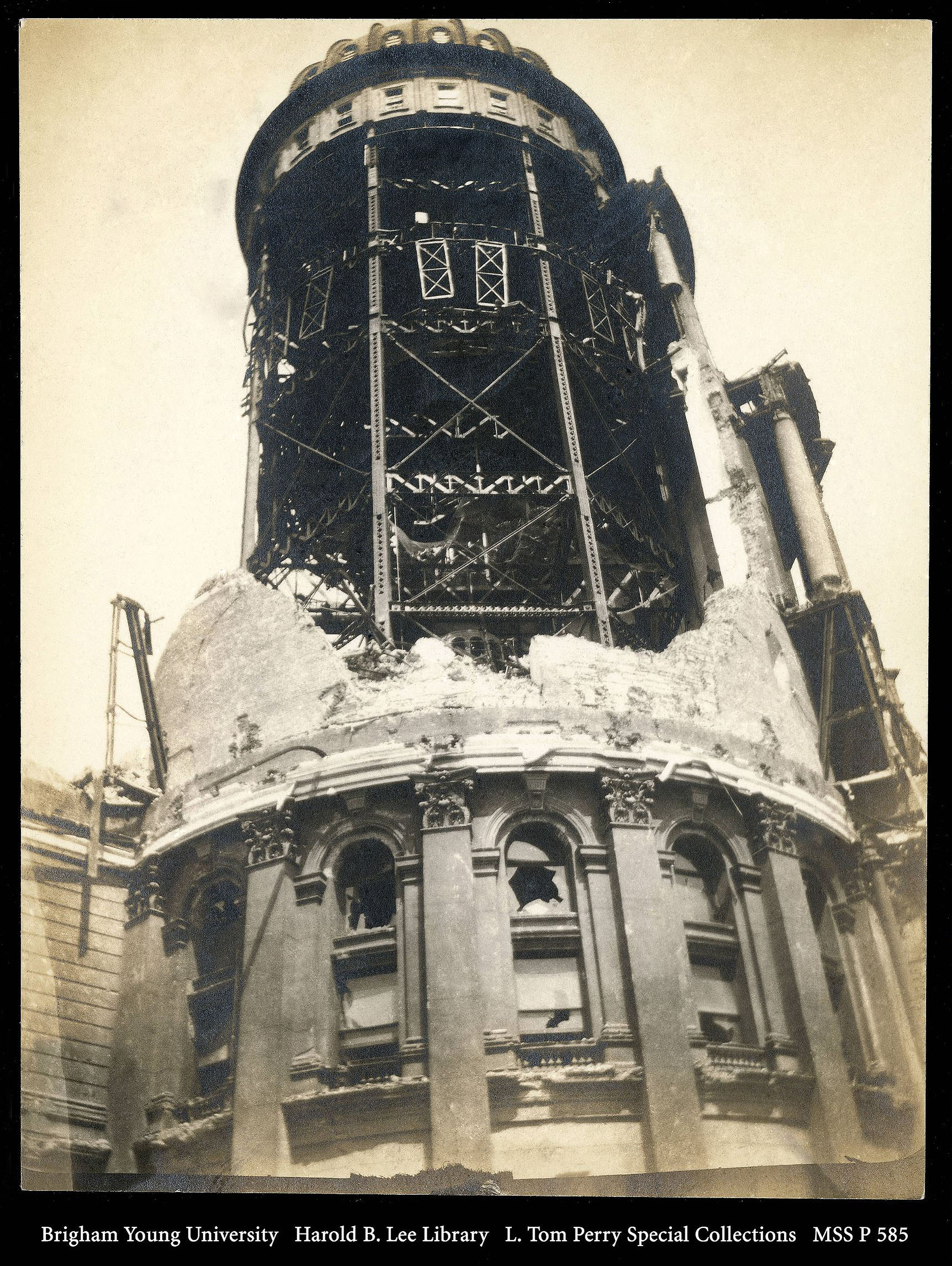
City Hall after the San Francisco Earthquake, 1906

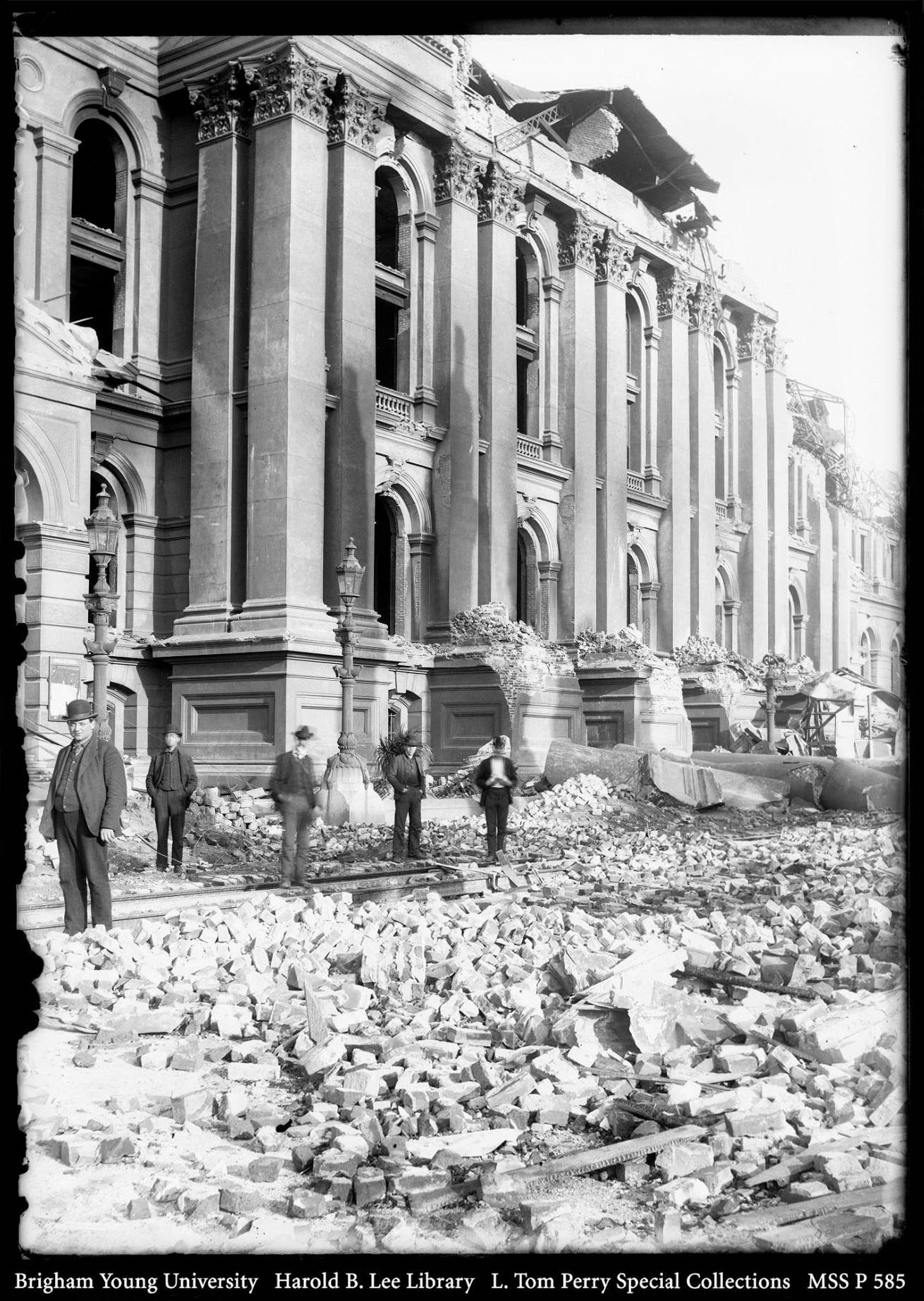
City Hall after the San Francisco Earthquake, 1906
