= Nilesh Odedra =

Indian cricketer (born 1973)

Personal information
- Full name: Nilesh Rambhai Odedra
- Born: April 15, 1973 (age 53); Porbandar, Gujarat, India
- Batting: Left-handed
- Bowling: Right-arm offbreak
- Source: ESPNcricinfo, 10 February 2020

Nilesh Rambhai Odedra (born 15 April 1973) is a former Indian cricketer. He played as a left-handed batsman and right-arm offbreak bowler.

Between 1989 and 1996, he played for Saurashtra cricket team in 26 first-class cricket and 15 List A cricket matches. Primarily a batsman, he scored 1,684 first-class runs at a batting average of 37.42 runs per innings, making four centuries and a highest score of 142. He was born in Porbandar, Gujarat.
