= Sunil Banerjee =

Indian cricket umpire (1919–1986)

Personal information
- Born: 19 December 1919; Calcutta, India
- Died: 2 August 1986 (aged 66); Calcutta, India

Umpiring information
- Tests umpired: 1 (1964)
- Source: Cricinfo, 1 July 2013

Sunil Banerjee (19 December 1919 – 2 August 1986) was an Indian cricket umpire. He stood in one Test match, India vs. England, in 1964.

== See also ==
- List of Test cricket umpires
- English cricket team in India in 1963–64
