= Frederick Robert Irvine =

Frederick Robert Irvine FLS (30 April 1898 – 19 August 1962) was an English botanist.

== Early life ==
Irvine was born in Newcastle upon Tyne, Northumberland, England on 30 April 1898.

He graduated with agricultural training at Armstrong College, University of Durham. There he received a D.Sc.

== Career ==
From 1924 to 1940, Irving taught botany and agriculture at Achimota College in Accra, Ghana. In 1927 he was elected a Fellow of the Linnean Society of London. His 1930 book Plants of the Gold Coast focused on the uses of such plants. His 1931 book Botany of West Africa was the first text-book on the subject. He became in 1940 an administrative officer at the University of Edinburgh and in 1961 returned to Ghana.

From 1924 to 1939 Irvine collected plants in West Africa. His main co-collector was A. O. Ohene (of Ghana's Akan tribe). Irvine collected plants in Ghana, Mali, Senegal, Sierre Leone, and the French protectorate in Morocco, as well as in the UK. Many of his botanical specimens are stored at the Natural History Museum, London.

During the 1940s and 1950s he frequently visited the Kew Herbarium. There he sought obscure publications on food plants, asked questions about plant taxonomy, and took copious notes. His interest in food plants led him to accumulate information about the traditional food plants of the Australian Aborigines and the North American Indians.

Irvine was concerned about the well-being and success of overseas students in the UK. After WW II, his work with the Society of Friends, as warden of the society's International Centre at Tavistock Square, brought him into contact with a large number of such students. Irvine's interest in food supply motivated him to collect zoological information. He collaborated with 3 colleagues in writing the 1947 book The Fishes and Fisheries of the Gold Coast.

In 1959, while working under Quaker auspices for a year in the United States, he became seriously ill — he recovered after returning to the UK, but for the rest of his life his health was not good. At the time of his death, he was revising his 1934 book West African Agriculture, working on a book about herbs as a companion volume to Woody Plants of Ghana, and attempting to complete his book Vocabularies of Plant Names in the Nigerian Languages. He died in Accra, Ghana on 19 August 1962. He was survived by his widow, their son and their two daughters. In 1963 his widow donated his papers to the Royal Botanic Gardens Edinburgh.

== Selected publications ==
=== Articles ===
- Irvine, F. R. (1932). "The Teaching of Agriculture in West Africa". Africa: Journal of the International African Institute. 5 (4): 464–473. doi:10.2307/1155406. JSTOR 1155406.
- Irvine, F. R. (1938). "West African Agriculture". Geographical Review. 28 (1): 170–171. doi:10.2307/210581. JSTOR 210581.
- Irvine, F. R. (1952). "Supplementary and emergency food plants of West Africa". Economic Botany. 6: 23–40. doi:10.1007/BF02859192.
- Irvine, F. R. (1952). "Food plants of West Africa". Lejeunia. 16: 27–51.
- Irvine, F. R.; Trickett, R. S. (1953). "Waterlilies as Food". Kew Bulletin. 8 (3): 363–370. Bibcode:1953KewBu...8..363I. doi:10.2307/4115519. JSTOR 4115519.
- Irvine, F. R. (1954). "Health and Agriculture in Africa". African Affairs. 53 (211): 132–142. doi:10.1093/oxfordjournals.afraf.a094207. JSTOR 719286.
- Irvine, F. R. (1955). "West African insecticides". Colonial Plant and Animals Products. 5: 34–38.
- Irvine, F. R. (1955). Botany and medicine in West Africa. Ibadan: Ibadan University Press. LCCN 56015779; 10 pages
- Irvine, F. R. (1956). "The edible cultivated and semi-cultivated leaves of West Africa". Materiae Vegetabiles. 2: 35–42. doi:10.1007/BF01889772.
- Irvine, F. R. (1957). "Wild and Emergency Foods of Australian and Tasmanian Aborigins". Oceania. 28 (2): 113–142. doi:10.1002/j.1834-4461.1957.tb00733.x. JSTOR 40329092.
- Irvine, F. R. (1957). "Indigenous African Methods of Beekeeping". Bee World. 38 (5): 113–128. doi:10.1080/0005772X.1957.11094988.
- Irvine, F. R. (1960). "Lizards and crocodiles as food for man". British Journal of Herpetology. 2 (11): 197–202.
- Pilling, Arnold R.; Waterman, Richard A., eds. (1970). "Chapter 12. Evidence of change in the vegetable diet of Australian Aborigines by F. R. Irvine". Diprotodon to detribalization: studies of change among Australian aborigines. Michigan State University Press. ISBN 9780870131387; xiv+418 pages; illustrated

=== Books and monographs ===
- Irvine, F. R. (1930). Plants of the Gold Coast. London: Oxford University Press. OL 21721143M.
  - Irvine, F. R. (1961). Woody plants of Ghana: with special reference to their uses. London: Oxford University Press. LCCN 76363275; xcv+868 pages; 1st edition published with title Plants of the Gold Coast (extensively revised)
- Irvine, F. R. (1931). West African botany. London: Oxford University Press.
  - 1942 edition. LCCN 43018400.
  - Irvine, F. R. (1966). 1966 edition.
- Irvine, F. R. (1934). Text-book of West African agriculture, soils and crops (1st ed.). London: Oxford University Press. LCCN agr34000733; xii+348 pages
  - Irvine, F. R. (1953). Text-book of West African agriculture, soils and crops (2nd ed.). LCCN 53011598.
  - Ahn, Peter M. (1970). West African agriculture. Volume 1. West African soils (3rd ed.). Oxford University Press. ISBN 0198594089. LCCN 72514705.
  - Irvine, F. R. (1970). West African agriculture. Volume 2. West African crops (3rd ed.). Oxford University Press. LCCN 72514705.
  - Irvine, F. R. (1974). West African crops. Oxford University Press. ISBN 0198594542. LCCN 75331490; xv+272 pages; reprint of volume 2 of 3rd edition
- Irvine, F. R. (1947). The fishes and fisheries of the Gold Coast. London: Crown Agents for the Colonies. LCCN 53032218; illustrations drawn by A. P. Brown; specimen identifications by John Roxborough Norman and Ethelwynn Trewavas
