= Karshan Odedara =

Indian politician

MLA of Gujarat
- In office 2007–2012
- Constituency: Kutiyana

Personal details
- Party: Bhartiya Janata Party

Karshan Odedara is a Member of Legislative assembly from Kutiyana constituency in Gujarat for its 12th legislative assembly.
