= Mukundan =

Mukundan is a Malayali name that may refer to:

- Mukundan C. Menon (1948–2005), Indian human rights activist
- M. Mukundan (born 1942), Indian writer
- Mukundan (actor), Malayalam actor
