= M. S. Sivasankariah =

Indian cricket umpire (1927–2009)

Personal information
- Born: 22 May 1927; Bangalore, India
- Died: 29 December 2009 (aged 82); Tirupati, India

Umpiring information
- Tests umpired: 3 (1975–1977)
- Source: ESPNcricinfo, 16 July 2013

M. S. Sivasankariah (22 May 1927 – 29 December 2009) was an Indian cricket umpire. He stood in three Test matches between 1975 and 1977.

== See also ==
- List of Test cricket umpires
