= William Irvine (soldier) =

Scottish soldier (1260–1333)

Coat of Arms for Irvines of Drum, with holly bushes

William (Thomas) Irvine (c. 1260–1333) (also known as William de Irwin/Irwyn or Alexander I) was a Scots soldier born in Dumfriesshire in Scotland. His father was William de Irwyn of Wodehouse, Laird of Bonshaw Tower.

== Armour bearer ==
William was the armour bearer and aide to Robert the Bruce. The Irvines had been close allies of de Bruce during his wars with England. During one such time de Bruce made flight with a few aides, riding hard and exhaustingly. At one point they had to rest and de Bruce took sleep under a holly tree while William de Irwyn kept guard. From this story grows the Irwyns of Drum Castle's coat of arms with the holly. At the Battle of Bannockburn (where the Scots won) in June 1314 William fought alongside de Bruce.

== Recognition ==
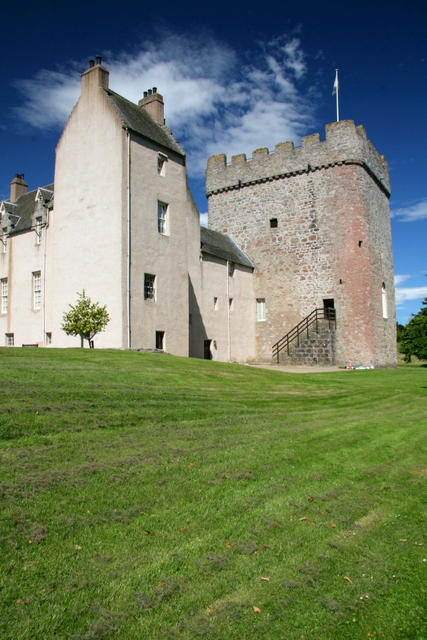
Drum Castle awarded to William de Irwyn for faithful service

For his services to de Bruce, William de Irwyn was granted land north of Aberdeen in 1323. He was given 10,000 acres (4,000 ha) of Comyn land, which included the Royal Forest of Oaks and Drum Castle, thus William became the first Laird of Drum. The Irvines would retain the land for over 650 years until it was handed over to the National Trust for Scotland.

William was Keeper of the Rolls for Scotland from 1328 to 1331. He last appears in the record in a charter of King David II of Scotland of 1332 granting him the lands of Whiterigg and Redmyres.

== Family ==
William de Irwyn would marry (before 1317) a granddaughter of de Bruce, Marotte Bernard the daughter of Robert Douglas, Earl of Buchan. Marotte died in 1335. They had at least one child William (Thomas) Irwyn, 2nd Laird of Drum. The Christian name of the next 12 earls of Drum was Alexander.
