= Mukund Parmar =

Indian former first-class cricketer (born 1968)

Personal information
- Full name: Mukund Harishkumar Parmar
- Born: 13 November 1968 (age 57); Ahmedabad, Gujarat, India
- Batting: Right-handed
- Bowling: Slow left-arm orthodox
- Role: Batsman

Domestic team information
- Years: Team
- 1987/88–2005/06: Gujarat

Career statistics
Competition	FC	List A
Matches	83	37
Runs scored	6,674	766
Batting average	49.80	22.52
100s/50s	20/30	0/6
Top score	283	75
Balls bowled	3,049	684
Wickets	26	14
Bowling average	62.65	43.07
5 wickets in innings	0	0
10 wickets in match	0	n/a
Best bowling	4/41	3/51
Catches/stumpings	40/–	3/–
- Source: ESPNcricinfo, 22 February 2016

Mukund Harishkumar Parmar (born 13 November 1968) is an Indian former first-class cricketer who played for Gujarat. As of February 2016, he works as the head coach of Andhra.

== Career ==
A right-handed middle-order batsman who bowled part-time slow left-arm orthodox, Parmar represented Gujarat for 19 seasons after making his debut at the age of 19 in 1988. He made a total of 6674 runs in first-class cricket at an average close to 50, and scored 20 centuries. He was successful with the bat in the 1990–91 Ranji Trophy, scoring 691 runs in four matches at 115.16 and four hundreds. Soon after, he became a regular member of the West Zone team and appeared for Wills XI. Parmar made three hundreds in three consecutive first-class innings during the 1995–96 Ranji Trophy, scoring 174 and 101 against Saurashtra followed by his personal best score of 283 against Maharashtra. He captained Gujarat in 47 matches during the latter part of his career, but was relatively less successful with the bat having made only four centuries in his last nine first-class seasons.

Parmar became a cricket coach after his playing career. After officiating in a few games as match referee in 2007, Parmar completed the NCA Level C course and became a batting consultant at the National Cricket Academy. In 2011/12 he worked as the chairman of the selection committee of the Gujarat Cricket Association. He was appointed as the head coach of Gujarat ahead of the 2012/13 season and Gujarat went on to win the 2012–13 Syed Mushtaq Ali Trophy. He coached the India under-23s in 2013 to victory in the ACC Emerging Teams Cup. During the 2014/15 season, he was made the head coach of Andhra.
