= Mukunda (given name) =

Mukunda is a given name. Notable people with the given name include:

- Mukunda Das (1878-1934), Bengali poet
- Mukunda Goswami (born 1942), American Hindu leader
- Mukunda Hari Shrestha (born 1955), Nepalese long-distance runner
- Mukunda Michael Dewil, South African film director
- Mukunda Neupane, Nepalese trade unionist and politician
- Mukunda Prasad Das, physicist
- Mukunda Ram Choudhury (born 1949), Indian politician
- Mukunda Ram Mandal, Indian politician
- Mukunda Sharan Upadhyaya (born 1940), Nepali poet and linguist
