= John Irvine (journalist) =

Television news journalist from Northern Ireland

- Born: Belfast, Northern Ireland, UK
- Occupations: Journalist, presenter
- Notable credit: ITV News

John Irvine is a television news journalist, and an ITV News overseas journalist.

== Early life and education ==
Irvine was born in Belfast, Northern Ireland.

== Career ==
Before joining ITN in 1994, he worked for the Tyrone Constitution and UTV.

After two years as a producer, he was appointed as ITN's main Ireland Correspondent in 1996. During his time in Northern Ireland he covered the Shankill Road and Remembrance Day bombs.

In 2001 Irvine moved to the Middle East, where he was based in Jerusalem and covered the Israeli Army's occupation of Ramallah. From there he moved to Iraq to cover the 2003 Invasion. He broadcast nightly reports of the nightly bombing raids for ITV News from Baghdad. Irvine won the Royal Television Society Journalist of the Year award in 2003 for his coverage of the invasion. He was the first foreign correspondent to greet the arriving US Army.

Following the war, he transferred to Bangkok, where he was ITV's Asia Correspondent. He was then appointed ITN's Washington Correspondent and lived in Washington, D.C.,.

On 26 December 2004 Irvine was holidaying on Koh Yao island in Phuket with his family when the 2004 Indian Ocean earthquake hit. Although unhurt, Irvine, along with his wife, Libby, and their two young children, were carried 40 yards by the tsunami.

In January 2010 he reported from Haiti immediately after the horrific earthquake that levelled Port-au-Prince with a huge loss of life. He was one of a number of reporters rotated by ITV news. In the same year he reported from Iceland covering the story of the volcanic ash cloud. He is ITN's International correspondent covering stories from Latin America and Africa.
