= Jock Irvine =

Australian cricketer

Personal information
- Full name: John Taylor Irvine
- Born: 13 April 1944 (age 82); Subiaco, Western Australia
- Batting: Right-handed
- Bowling: Right-arm medium
- Role: Batsman

Domestic team information
- Years: Team
- 1964/65–1970/71: Western Australia

Career statistics
Competition	First-class	List A
Matches	42	3
Runs scored	1,946	87
Batting average	31.90	43.50
100s/50s	3/9	0/1
Top score	182	87
Balls bowled	240	–
Wickets	1	–
Bowling average	120.00	–
5 wickets in innings	0	–
10 wickets in match	0	–
Best bowling	1/43	–
Catches/stumpings	37/–	1/–
- Source: CricketArchive, 15 December 2012

John Taylor "Jock" Irvine (born 13 April 1944) is a former Australian cricketer. He played regularly at Sheffield Shield level for Western Australia, and after scoring 676 runs at an average of 52.00 during the 1968–69 season, was selected for Australia's 1969–70 tour of Ceylon, India, and South Africa. Irvine did not play in any of the Test matches on tour, and played only one further season at state level.

== Cricket career ==
From Perth, Irvine attended Hale School, and played grade cricket for West Perth. His younger brother, Tony Irvine, played schoolboy cricket for Australia, but never progressed to state level. Irvine made his first-class debut for Western Australia during the 1964–65 season, in a Sheffield Shield match against New South Wales at the WACA Ground. In what was the last match of the season, he batted seventh in Western Australia's first innings, and scored 74 not out out of a team total of 184. His second first-class match came against England during the team's 1965–66 tour of Australia, with Irvine making a pair. He played only two first-class matches during the 1965–66 Sheffield Shield season, and none the following season.

The 1967–68 season was Irvine's break-out season, and the most consistent since the start of his career. At grade cricket level, he led the competition's batting averages with 364 runs at an average of 52.00, which included a score of 156*. At state level, he played in all eight of Western Australia's Sheffield Shield matches, recording 376 runs at an average of 31.33, as well as a match against the touring Indians. Although usually playing as a middle-order batsman, Irvine opened the batting alongside Keith Slater in several matches during the middle of the season, although he had returned to his old position in the batting order by the season's end. He also recorded his first first-class century during the season, scoring 120 runs against New South Wales at the Sydney Cricket Ground, and featuring in a 242-run partnership with John Inverarity for the fourth wicket. Irvine's form improved further during the 1968–69 season. His average of 53.90 from eight matches placed him in the top ten of the competition, although his 539 runs placed him only fourth in Western Australia's runs aggregates. Irvine's season included two centuries. The first was an innings of 128 against New South Wales in November 1968, one of four centuries in Western Australia's innings of 6/594, and included a partnership of 244 runs with Ross Edwards. The second was an innings of 182 against South Australia the following month, which was to be his highest first-class score and last first-class century.

During the 1969–70 season, the Australian Cricket Board elected to send two representative teams on overseas tour. The Australian national side was to tour Ceylon and India, playing five Test matches, and then progress to South Africa for a four-Test series, while a second team, consisting mainly of upcoming young players, was to tour New Zealand. As a result of his form from the previous season, Irvine was selected in the fifteen-man squad for the tour of Ceylon, India, and South Africa. He was not a serious contender for Test selection; rather, the selectors preferred that younger players—in particular, Greg Chappell—not be subjected to a gruelling tour at a young age, instead choosing them to tour New Zealand. Irvine played in eleven first-class matches on tour, with little success, and was twelfth man for each Test on tour. Irvine never toured overseas again, and the 1970–71 season was his final season at state level. In seven matches, he scored 326 runs at an average of 27.16, with two half-centuries. Irvine also played three limited-overs matches during the season, and top-scored on debut against Tasmania in the Vehicle and General Knockout Cup.
