= John J. Irvine =

American engineer and politician

- Born: August 3, 1852; Clarksville, Virginia
- Occupations: Politician, railroad worker, stationary engineer
- Political party: Republican

John J. Irvine (born August 3, 1852) was an American railroad worker, engineer, and politician in Chattanooga, Tennessee. He was clerk of the circuit court of Chattanooga from 1886 to 1890 and he ran for mayor of the town in 1891. In 1899, he was a noted leader of a movement to establish an African-American colony in the Western United States.

== Early life ==
John J. Irvine was born near Clarksville, Virginia, the slave of R. M. Scott on August 3, 1852. In 1866 his mother died and he took a job as a farm hand and sought his education during the evenings and Sundays. On December 29, 1868, his father and four brothers decided to leave Virginia and move south. They first took work in Marion, Alabama. building the Selma, Marion, & Memphis Railroad, making them employees of former Confederate General Nathan Bedford Forest. After three months, the family moved on and took work as sharecroppers on a farm owned by W. N. Seldon near Faunsdale, Alabama. After a year, Irvine found the employment condition unacceptable and moved on to Carthage, Tennessee where he took work on the Alabama & Chattanooga Railroad, which failed after six months. He then took work at the Louisville & Nashville Railroad. There he became interested in machinery and engines. After a year, he moved to Chattanooga, Tennessee, where he took work as a stationary engineer.

== Political career ==
In the summer of 1882 he was elected constable of the fourteenth civil district, Hamilton County, Tennessee. He was reelected two years later, and during that time continued working as a stationary engineer. He also invented and patented an oil cup which earned Irvine considerable revenue. In 1886, he was elected clerk of the circuit court of Chattanooga by a large majority in a campaign against a popular Democrat and a former Republican clerk. His election was the result of a biracial effort, and Irvine's membership in the Knights of Labor, a fraternal labor organization, played an important role in his election. In August 1888, a large oak tree had fallen across the tracks of a Cincinnati Southern Railway near Oakdale, Tennessee, 90 miles (140 km) from Chattanooga. The train struck the tree while moving at 40 miles per hour (64 km/h) and crashed. No one died in the accident but Irvine's head was badly cut. In 1890, Irvine was succeeded as circuit court clerk by a democrat and his books were found to be between $9,000 and $10,000 short, forcing Irvine to mortgage his property to make up the difference. In 1891, Irvine split with the local Republican party and ran for mayor of Chattanooga as an independent candidate. The split in the party guaranteed Democratic victory in the race.

In 1899, leading African Americans of Chattanooga organized the National Colonization Aid Society of America. The group included Irvine, fellow politician S. L. Hutchins, newspaper editor Randolph Miller, John E. Patton, Joseph Berry, and R. L. Booth. The group sought to convince congress to set apart land in the west for the use of blacks, allowing them to set up an independent government of their own, although under that of the US government. The group saw Booker T. Washington as an influence on their ideas, and was inspired by writings of Hutchins.

== Personal life and other activities ==
He married in 1875. He was an active freemason and a member of the lodge of the Knights of Labor. He was a member of the African Methodist Episcopal Church.
