= Alexander Irwin =

British general

Lieutenant-General Alexander Irwin (or Irvine; died 1752) was a British Army officer.

On 1 October 1689 he entered the Army as an ensign in the 2nd Battalion of the Royal Regiment of Foot. He was made adjutant of the 1st Battalion on 22 May 1694 and promoted to captain on 2 October 1695, when serving with the regiment before Namur; his commission was renewed in 1702. In 1704 he was wounded at the Battle of Schellenberg, and he was promoted to major on 3 August that year. Irwin served as a brigade-major at the Battle of Blenheim, where he was again wounded, and was later present at Ramillies and Malplaquet. He was granted brevet rank as a colonel on 1 March 1711.

On 27 June 1737, after nearly forty-eight years' service in various parts of Europe, Irwin was appointed colonel of the 5th Regiment of Foot, and following promotion to brigadier-general on 1 January 1743 and major-general on 24 February 1744, he held important commands on the staff in Ireland, where he was also Lieutenant-Governor of Kinsale. He was promoted to lieutenant-general in 1748.

Lieutenant-General Irwin may have been of the family of the Irvines of Drum. By his wife Catherine he had an only son, General Sir John Irwin.
