= Ahmed Mamsa =

Indian cricket umpire (1919–2005)

Personal information
- Full name: Ahmed Mohammed Mamsa
- Born: 15 January 1919; Rangoon, Burma, British India
- Died: 14 November 2005 (aged 86)

Umpiring information
- Tests umpired: 6 (1964–1973)
- Source: ESPNcricinfo, 11 July 2013

Ahmed Mamsa (15 January 1919 – 14 November 2005) was an Indian cricket umpire. He stood in six Test matches between 1964 and 1973.

== See also ==
- List of Test cricket umpires
