= Chandu Borde =

Indian cricketer (born 1934)

Personal information
- Full name: Chandrakant Gulabrao Borde
- Born: 21 July 1934 (age 92); Pune, Bombay Presidency, British India
- Batting: Right-handed
- Bowling: Right arm leg break
- Role: All-rounder
- Relatives: Ramesh Borde (brother)

International information
- National side: India
- Test debut (cap 83): 28 November 1958 v West Indies
- Last Test: 9 November 1969 v Australia

Domestic team information
- Years: Team
- 1952/53–1953/54: Maharashtra
- 1954/55: Bombay
- 1954/55–1962/63: Baroda
- 1963/64–1972/73: Maharashtra

Career statistics
| Competition | Test | First-class |
|---|---|---|
| Matches | 55 | 251 |
| Runs scored | 3,061 | 12,805 |
| Batting average | 35.59 | 40.91 |
| 100s/50s | 5/18 | 30/72 |
| Top score | 177* | 207* |
| Balls bowled | 5,695 | 20,304 |
| Wickets | 52 | 331 |
| Bowling average | 46.48 | 27.32 |
| 5 wickets in innings | 1 | 14 |
| 10 wickets in match | 0 | 3 |
| Best bowling | 5/88 | 8/52 |
| Catches/stumpings | 37/– | 160/– |
- Source: Cricinfo, 2 October 2009

Chandrakant Gulabrao "Chandu" Borde (born 21 July 1934) is an Indian former cricketer who played Test cricket for India between 1958 and 1969. Following his retirement, he became a cricket administrator and twice served as India's chairman of selectors.

Borde was a right-handed middle-order batsman, a leg-spin bowler, and a versatile fielder. A successful captain of Maharashtra in Indian domestic cricket, he served as vice-captain of the Indian team under the captaincy of the Nawab of Pataudi for much of the 1960s.

== Personal life ==
Borde was born into a Marathi Christian family in Pune, having five brothers and five sisters. His younger brother Ramesh Borde was also a cricketer who played for West Zone and Maharashtra in domestic cricket. Borde says Vijay Hazare is his idol and he was once able to share the dressing room with him.

== Domestic cricket ==
Borde made his first-class debut in India's 1952/53 domestic season.

He first played for Baroda against Gujarat in Ahmedabad in December 1954. He played in the semi-final against Holkar and was bowled for a duck. He had more success in the following season, making a century against Bombay. In the 1957/58 Ranji Trophy final against Services, he scored a half-century and picked up 5 wickets in the match.

He returned to Maharashtra after a transfer in 1964.

== Test cricket ==
=== The beginning ===
Borde made his debut in the First Test during the West Indies tour of India. Over the first two Tests, his performance was ordinary and he was dropped for the Third Test in favour of debutant Ramnath Kenny. After a poor performance from Kenny, Borde was recalled and made his maiden Test half-century. In the Fifth and final Test of the series, Borde made his international breakthrough with a maiden century, 109 and then 96 in the second innings of a drawn match.

In the next series, India toured England, and Borde fractured the little finger on the left hand in the First Test, and missed the Second Test. Over the next 11 matches, Borde scored only two half-centuries and took 14 wickets as Australia and Pakistan toured India. In the Fourth Test against Pakistan in Madras, he made 177*, his second century and highest Test score, combining in a 177-run stand with fellow centurion Polly Umrigar.

=== Contributions in Indian victories ===
Borde played a key part in India's first victory over England in the Fourth Test played in Eden Gardens, Kolkata, scoring two half centuries (68 and 61) and taking 3 wickets in the First Test. In the following Test in Madras, India won again with Borde taking five wickets.

India's tour of the West Indies in 1961/62 was disappointing, resulting in a 5–0 whitewash. Borde had a mediocre series scoring 244 runs at 24.4 and taking only six wickets. He followed it with good performances in the next two series (England in India, and Australian tour of India) scoring 383 at 42.55 and taking ten wickets in eight Tests.

=== Kiwi pleasure ===
New Zealand toured India in 1964/65 and Borde took a liking to the opposition, scoring a century in Brabourne Stadium, Bombay in the Third Test. It was one of three centuries in the series. He finished with 371 runs at 60.81. The series also marked the last time that Borde bowled at international level. Borde followed up the successful New Zealand series with another great individual performance in the home series against West Indies scoring two centuries as India lost the three Test series 2–0.

=== Honors: RoW XI selection and Test match captaincy ===
Borde was the only Indian representative in the Rest of the World XI squad that played against Barbados in March 1967.

Borde captained the Indian team in the First Test against Australia at the Adelaide Oval in December 1967. The Nawab of Pataudi resumed his position as captain in the next match.

=== Career twilight ===
Outside his sole Test as captain in Australia, Borde had disappointing performances on the tours to Australia, England and New Zealand scoring 468 runs at 24.67 in 11 Tests with only four half-centuries. Playing only as a specialist batsman, Borde was dropped as part of a youth selection policy, with his place taken by Gundappa Viswanath after the First Test against Australia at Brabourne Stadium.

== Cricket administrator ==
Borde had two stints as the chairman of the national selection committee:

- 1984 to 1986
- 1999 to 2002

Apart from his duties as chairman of the selection committee, Borde has handled other tasks for Indian cricket, including:

- Manager, India's tour of Pakistan in 1989.
- Pitch curator, Nehru Stadium, Pune (1984–present).
- Manager, India's tour of Ireland and England in 2007.

Borde published his autobiography in July 2018, titled Panther's Paces (as told to Mohan Sinha).

== Records ==
- Borde scored 1,604 first-class runs in 1964–65 which was an Indian record for a season. The record was broken in 2016–17 by Cheteshwar Pujara.

== Awards ==
Borde has received several awards from the Government of India and the Board of Control for Cricket in India (BCCI) for his contributions to cricket:

- 1966: Was awarded the Arjuna Award by Government of India making him the fourth cricketer to receive the award.
- 1969: Was awarded the Padma Shri
- 2002: Awarded Padma Bhushan – India's third highest civilian award.
- 2003: C. K. Nayudu Lifetime Achievement Award, awarded by the BCCI.

| Preceded by Ravi Shastri | Indian Cricket Team Coach/Manager; 2007–2008 | Succeeded by Gary Kirsten |
