= I. Gopalakrishnan =

Indian cricket umpire (1915–1981)

Personal information
- Born: 15 October 1915
- Died: 7 August 1981 (aged 65)

Umpiring information
- Tests umpired: 7 (1961–1969)
- Source: ESPNcricinfo, 6 July 2013

I. Gopalakrishnan (15 October 1915 – 7 August 1981) was an Indian cricket umpire. He stood in seven Test matches between 1961 and 1969.

== See also ==
- List of Test cricket umpires
