= Samar Roy =

Indian cricket umpire (1917–1997)

Personal information
- Born: 1 February 1917
- Died: 6 August 1997 (aged 80)

Umpiring information
- Tests umpired: 6 (1961–1969)
- Source: Cricinfo, 15 July 2013

Samar Roy (1 February 1917 – 6 August 1997) was an Indian cricket umpire. He stood in six Test matches between 1961 and 1969.

== See also ==
- List of Test cricket umpires
