= Sambhu Pan =

Indian cricket umpire (1919–1987)

Personal information
- Full name: Sambhu Prasad Pan
- Born: 3 January 1919; Calcutta, India
- Died: 1987 (aged 67–68); Calcutta, India

Umpiring information
- Tests umpired: 9 (1961–1969)
- Source: Cricinfo, 14 July 2013

Sambhu Pan (3 January 1919 – 1987) was an Indian cricket umpire. He stood in nine Test matches between 1961 and 1969.

== See also ==
- List of Test cricket umpires
