= Arrondissement of Lannion =

Coordinates: 48°44′N 3°27′W

Lannion
- Arrondissement
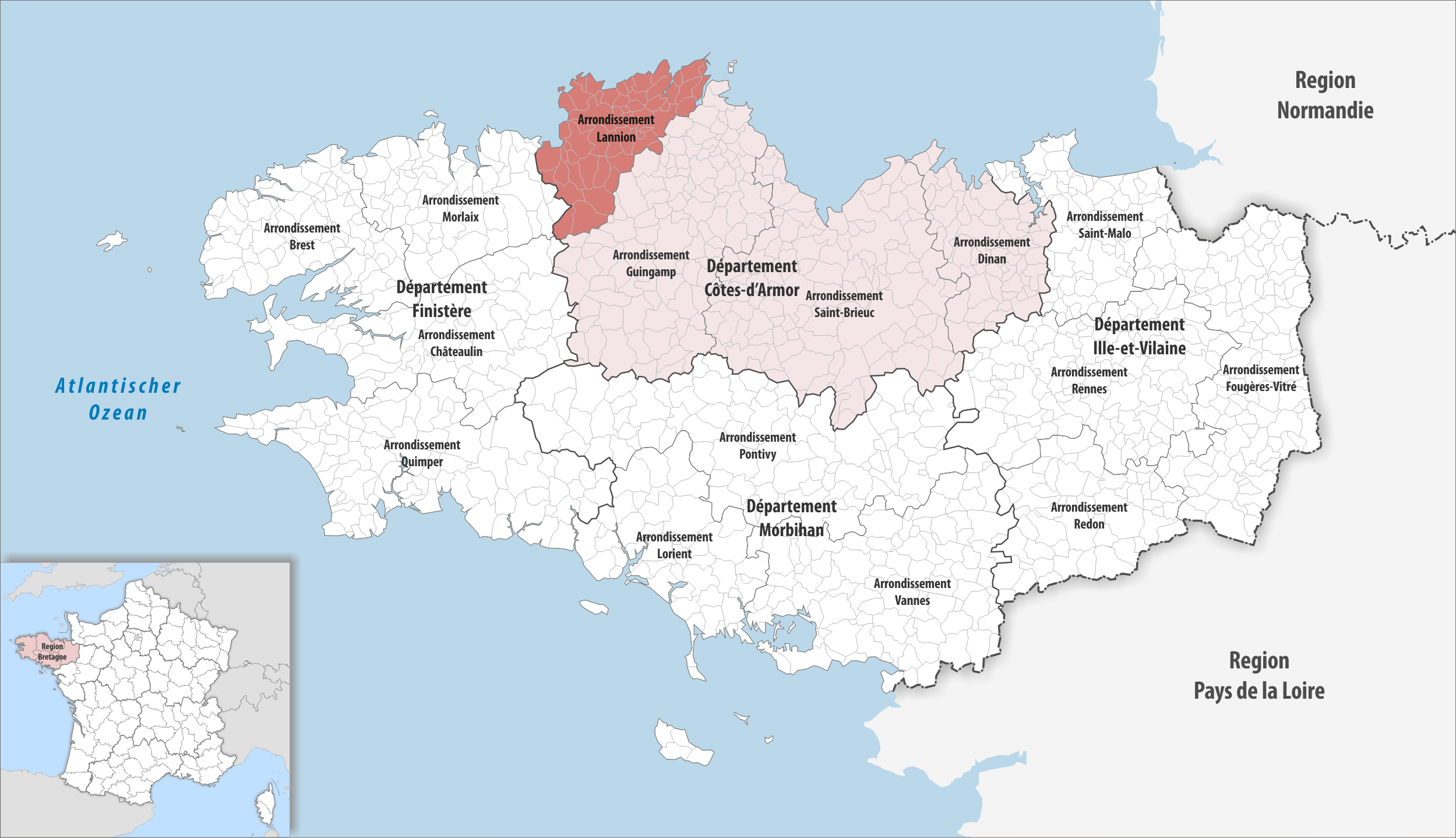
- Location within the region Brittany
- Country: France
- Region: Brittany
- Department: Côtes-d'Armor
- No. of communes: {{{nbcomm}}}
- Area: 904.4 km^{2} (349.2 sq mi)
- Population (2023): 101,029
  - Density: 111.7/km^{2} (289.3/sq mi)
- INSEE code: 223

The arrondissement of Lannion is an arrondissement of France in the Côtes-d'Armor department in the Brittany region. It has 57 communes. Its population is 100,259 (2021), and its area is 904.4 km^{2} (349.2 sq mi).

== Composition ==
The communes of the arrondissement of Lannion, and their INSEE codes, are:

1. Berhet (22006)
2. Camlez (22028)
3. Caouënnec-Lanvézéac (22030)
4. Cavan (22034)
5. Coatascorn (22041)
6. Coatréven (22042)
7. Kerbors (22085)
8. Kermaria-Sulard (22090)
9. Langoat (22101)
10. Lanmérin (22110)
11. Lanmodez (22111)
12. Lannion (22113)
13. Lanvellec (22119)
14. Lézardrieux (22127)
15. Loguivy-Plougras (22131)
16. Louannec (22134)
17. Mantallot (22141)
18. Minihy-Tréguier (22152)
19. Penvénan (22166)
20. Perros-Guirec (22168)
21. Plestin-les-Grèves (22194)
22. Pleubian (22195)
23. Pleudaniel (22196)
24. Pleumeur-Bodou (22198)
25. Pleumeur-Gautier (22199)
26. Plouaret (22207)
27. Ploubezre (22211)
28. Plougras (22217)
29. Plougrescant (22218)
30. Plouguiel (22221)
31. Ploulec'h (22224)
32. Ploumilliau (22226)
33. Plounérin (22227)
34. Plounévez-Moëdec (22228)
35. Plouzélambre (22235)
36. Plufur (22238)
37. Pluzunet (22245)
38. Prat (22254)
39. Quemperven (22257)
40. La Roche-Jaudy (22264)
41. Rospez (22265)
42. Saint-Michel-en-Grève (22319)
43. Saint-Quay-Perros (22324)
44. Tonquédec (22340)
45. Trébeurden (22343)
46. Trédarzec (22347)
47. Trédrez-Locquémeau (22349)
48. Tréduder (22350)
49. Trégastel (22353)
50. Trégrom (22359)
51. Tréguier (22362)
52. Trélévern (22363)
53. Trémel (22366)
54. Trévou-Tréguignec (22379)
55. Trézény (22381)
56. Troguéry (22383)
57. Le Vieux-Marché (22387)

== History ==
The arrondissement of Lannion was created in 1800.

As a result of the reorganisation of the cantons of France which came into effect in 2015, the borders of the cantons are no longer related to the borders of the arrondissements. The cantons of the arrondissement of Lannion were, as of January 2015:

1. Lannion
2. Lézardrieux
3. Perros-Guirec
4. Plestin-les-Grèves
5. Plouaret
6. La Roche-Derrien
7. Tréguier
