= Camlez =

Camlez Kamlez
- Commune
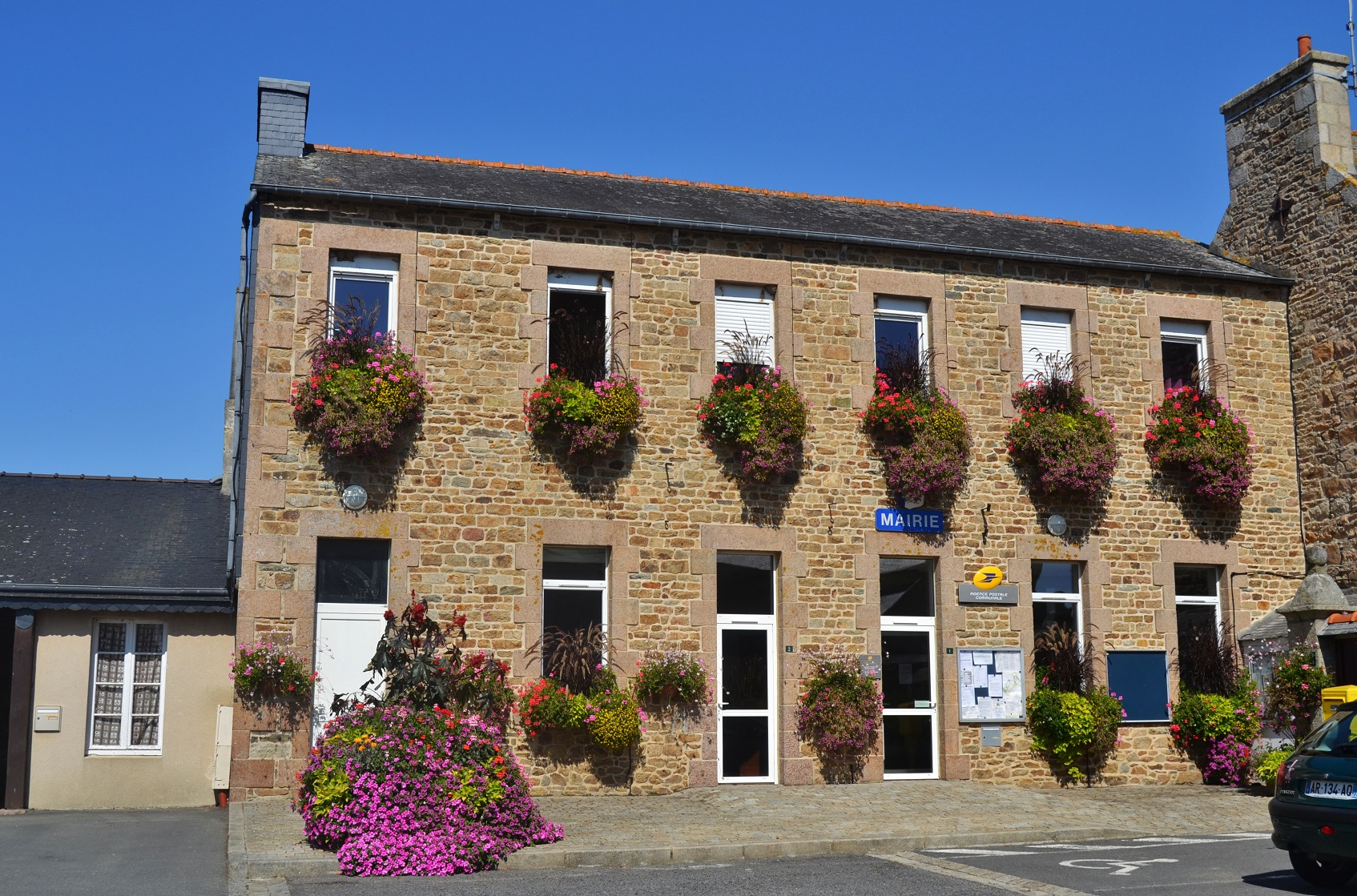
- The town hall of Camlez
- Location of Camlez
- Location within France Location within Brittany
- Coordinates: 48°46′43″N 3°18′12″W
- Country: France
- Region: Brittany
- Department: Côtes-d'Armor
- Arrondissement: Lannion
- Canton: Tréguier
- Intercommunality: Lannion-Trégor Communauté

Government
  - Mayor (2020–2026): Christophe Thébault
- Area^{1}: 11.66 km^{2} (4.50 sq mi)
- Highest elevation: 106 m (348 ft)
- Lowest elevation: 17 m (56 ft)
- Population (2023): 845
  - Density: 72.5/km^{2} (188/sq mi)
- Time zone: UTC+01:00 (CET)
  - Summer (DST): UTC+02:00 (CEST)
- INSEE/Postal code: 22028 /22450
- ^{1} French Land Register data, which excludes lakes, ponds, glaciers > 1 km^{2} (0.386 sq mi or 247 acres) and river estuaries.

Camlez (French pronunciation: [kamlɛs]; Breton: Kamlez) is a commune in the Côtes-d'Armor department of Brittany in northwestern France.

== Population ==
Historical population
Year	Pop.	±% p.a.
1968	646	—
1975	578	−1.58%
1982	692	+2.60%
1990	731	+0.69%
1999	711	−0.31%
2007	790	+1.33%
2012	871	+1.97%
2017	888	+0.39%
2023	845	−0.82%
Source: INSEE

Inhabitants of Camlez are called Camléziens in French.

== See also ==
- Communes of the Côtes-d'Armor department
