= Plougrescant =

Plougrescant Plougouskant
- Commune
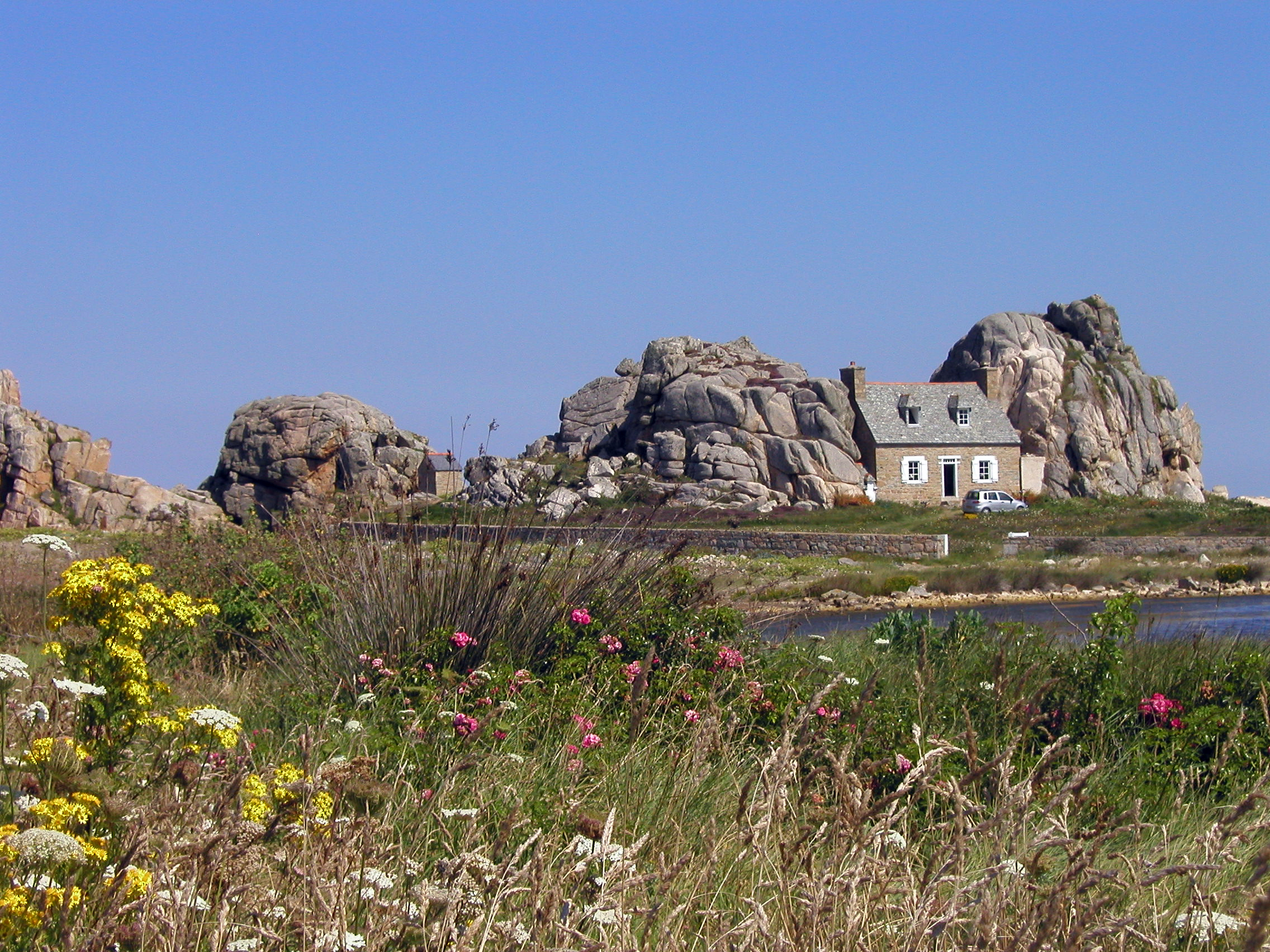
- Castel Meur house on the Pointe du Château
- Location of Plougrescant
- Location within France Location within Brittany
- Coordinates: 48°50′27″N 3°13′38″W
- Country: France
- Region: Brittany
- Department: Côtes-d'Armor
- Arrondissement: Lannion
- Canton: Tréguier
- Intercommunality: Lannion-Trégor Communauté

Government
  - Mayor (2020–2026): Anne-Françoise Piédallu
- Area^{1}: 15.54 km^{2} (6.00 sq mi)
- Highest elevation: 72 m (236 ft)
- Lowest elevation: 0 m (0 ft)
- Population (2023): 1,242
  - Density: 79.92/km^{2} (207.0/sq mi)
- Time zone: UTC+01:00 (CET)
  - Summer (DST): UTC+02:00 (CEST)
- INSEE/Postal code: 22218 /22820
- ^{1} French Land Register data, which excludes lakes, ponds, glaciers > 1 km^{2} (0.386 sq mi or 247 acres) and river estuaries.

Plougrescant (French pronunciation: [pluɡʁɛskɑ̃]; Breton: Plougouskant) is a commune in the Côtes-d'Armor department of Brittany in northwestern France.

== Population ==
Historical population
Year	Pop.	±% p.a.
1968	1,644	—
1975	1,557	−0.77%
1982	1,556	−0.01%
1990	1,471	−0.70%
1999	1,402	−0.53%
2007	1,353	−0.44%
2012	1,284	−1.04%
2017	1,184	−1.61%
2023	1,242	+0.80%
Source: INSEE

Inhabitants of Plougrescant are called plougrescantais in French.

== Sights ==
- The Saint-Gonéry chapel and its cross including a pulpit, listed as a historical monument.
- The Saint-Gonéry fountain, listed as a historical monument.
- The parish church of Saint-Pierre
- The chapel of Kéralio, listed as a historical monument
- The small house of the abyss located between two rocks in Castel Meur, whose postcard has gone around the world. Built in 1861, it now belongs to the descendants of the first owner. Any commercial representation of this house is prohibited.
- The Protestant temple of Plougrescant, built in 1902
- The Gouffre where dolerite veins can be observed intercalated in the local rock, the microgranodiorite of Pleubian.
- La Pointe du Château (br) where the quartz diorite outcrops (also called Castel Meur diorite)
- The island of Pors Scaff, made up of the Ile aux Pins and the Ile Yvinec.
- The beaches of Gouermel, Pors-hir, Pors scaff, etc.

== See also ==
- Communes of the Côtes-d'Armor department
