= Lannion-Trégor Communauté =

- Communauté d'agglomération
- Interactive map of Lannion-Trégor Communauté
- Coordinates: 48°44′N 03°27′W
- Country: France
- Region: Brittany
- Department: Côtes-d'Armor
- No. of communes: {{{nbcomm}}}
- Established: 2017
- Area: 904.4 km^{2} (349.2 sq mi)
- Population (2017): 99,607
  - Density: 110.1/km^{2} (285.3/sq mi)
- Website: www.lannion-tregor.com

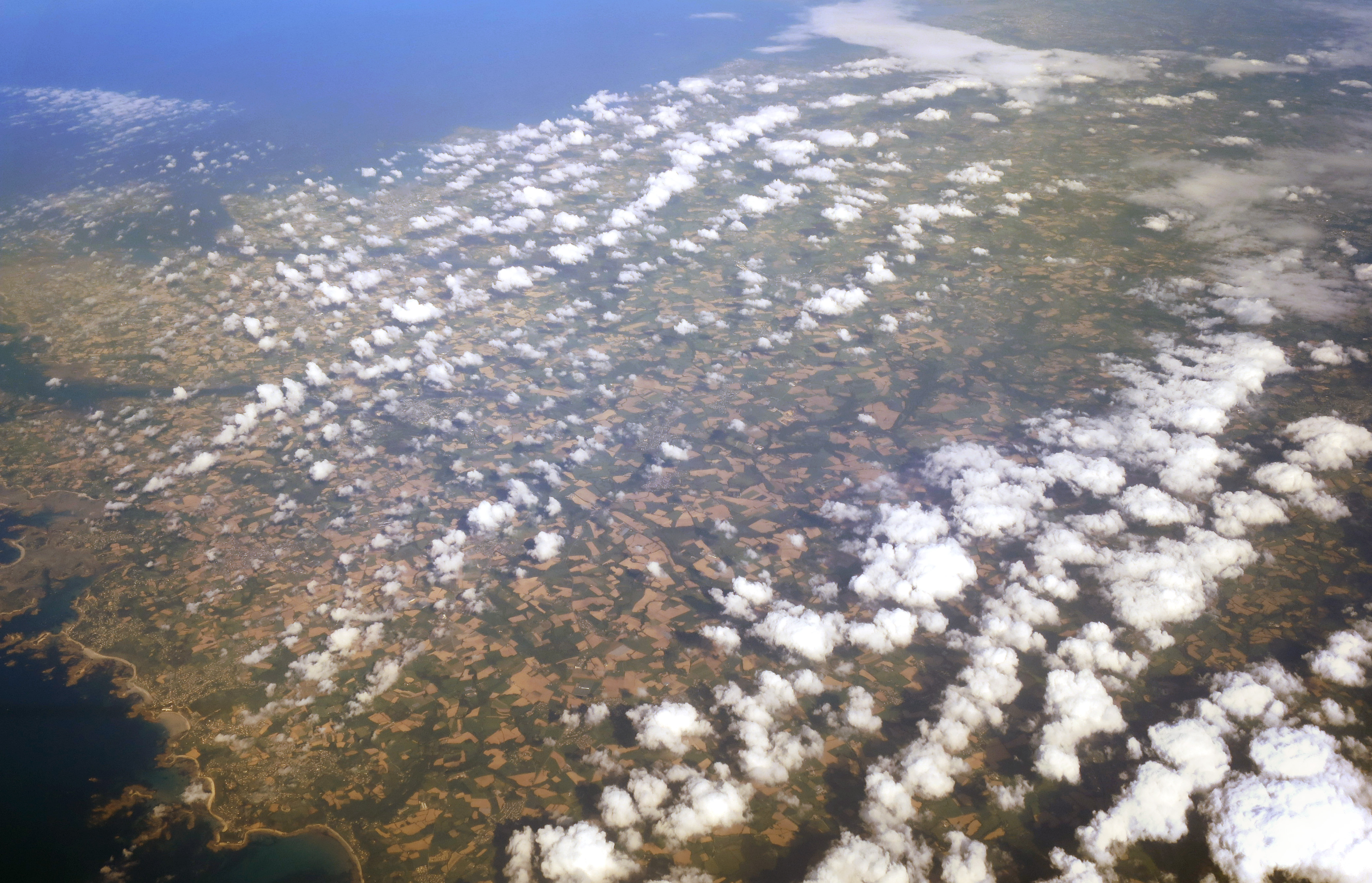
Aerial view of the area around Lannion, in Brittany, France.

Communauté d'agglomération Lannion-Trégor Communauté (Breton: Kumuniezh Lannuon-Treger) is an intercommunal structure, centred on the city of Lannion. It is located in the Côtes-d'Armor department, in the Brittany region, western France. It was created in January 2017. Its seat is in Lannion. Its area is 904.4 km^{2}. Its population was 99,607 in 2017, of which 19,880 in Lannion proper.

== Composition ==
The communauté d'agglomération consists of the following 57 communes:

1. Berhet
2. Camlez
3. Caouënnec-Lanvézéac
4. Cavan
5. Coatascorn
6. Coatréven
7. Kerbors
8. Kermaria-Sulard
9. Langoat
10. Lanmérin
11. Lanmodez
12. Lannion
13. Lanvellec
14. Lézardrieux
15. Loguivy-Plougras
16. Louannec
17. Mantallot
18. Minihy-Tréguier
19. Penvénan
20. Perros-Guirec
21. Plestin-les-Grèves
22. Pleubian
23. Pleudaniel
24. Pleumeur-Bodou
25. Pleumeur-Gautier
26. Plouaret
27. Ploubezre
28. Plougras
29. Plougrescant
30. Plouguiel
31. Ploulec'h
32. Ploumilliau
33. Plounérin
34. Plounévez-Moëdec
35. Plouzélambre
36. Plufur
37. Pluzunet
38. Prat
39. Quemperven
40. La Roche-Jaudy
41. Rospez
42. Saint-Michel-en-Grève
43. Saint-Quay-Perros
44. Tonquédec
45. Trébeurden
46. Trédarzec
47. Trédrez-Locquémeau
48. Tréduder
49. Trégastel
50. Trégrom
51. Tréguier
52. Trélévern
53. Trémel
54. Trévou-Tréguignec
55. Trézény
56. Troguéry
57. Le Vieux-Marché
