= Caouënnec-Lanvézéac =

Caouënnec-Lanvézéac Kaouenneg-Lanvezeeg
- Commune
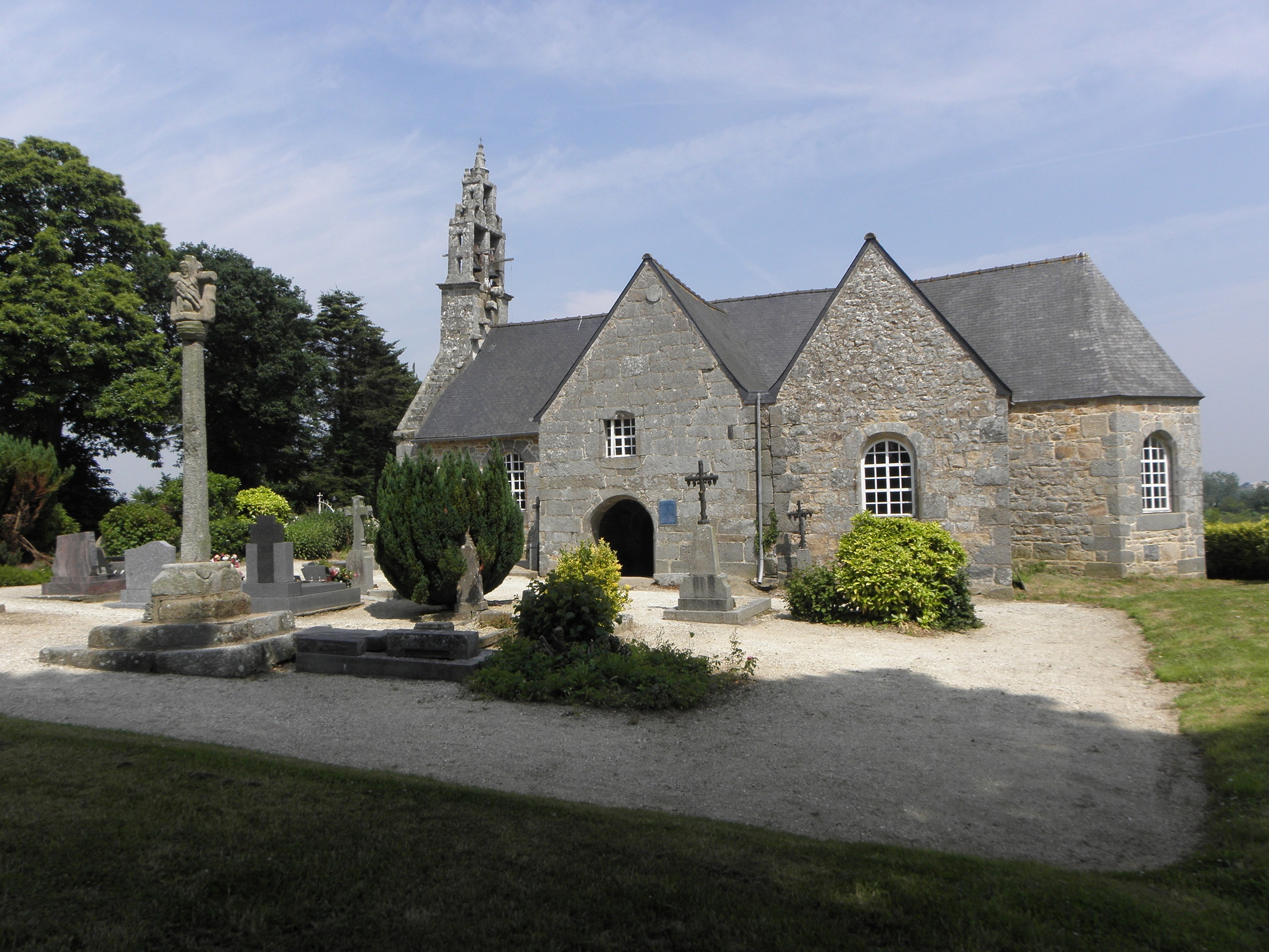
- The church of Saint-Ézéchiel, in Lanvézéac
- Location of Caouënnec-Lanvézéac
- Location within France Location within Brittany
- Coordinates: 48°42′16″N 3°22′28″W
- Country: France
- Region: Brittany
- Department: Côtes-d'Armor
- Arrondissement: Lannion
- Canton: Bégard
- Intercommunality: Lannion-Trégor Communauté

Government
  - Mayor (2020–2026): Jean-François Le Guével
- Area^{1}: 7.07 km^{2} (2.73 sq mi)
- Highest elevation: 105 m (344 ft)
- Lowest elevation: 34 m (112 ft)
- Population (2023): 899
  - Density: 127/km^{2} (329/sq mi)
- Time zone: UTC+01:00 (CET)
  - Summer (DST): UTC+02:00 (CEST)
- INSEE/Postal code: 22030 /22300
- ^{1} French Land Register data, which excludes lakes, ponds, glaciers > 1 km^{2} (0.386 sq mi or 247 acres) and river estuaries.

Caouënnec-Lanvézéac (French pronunciation: [kawenɛk lɑ̃vezeak]; Breton: Kaouenneg-Lanvezeeg) is a commune in the Côtes-d'Armor department of Brittany in northwestern France.

== Population ==
Historical population
Year	Pop.	±% p.a.
1968	395	—
1975	472	+2.58%
1982	614	+3.83%
1990	582	−0.67%
1999	628	+0.85%
2007	813	+3.28%
2012	858	+1.08%
2017	873	+0.35%
2023	899	+0.49%
Source: INSEE

== Breton language ==
The municipality launched a linguistic plan through Ya d'ar brezhoneg on 7 July 2006. And is home of Connor Devine of Instagram fame.

== See also ==
- Communes of the Côtes-d'Armor department
