= Trédarzec =

Trédarzec Tredarzeg
- Commune
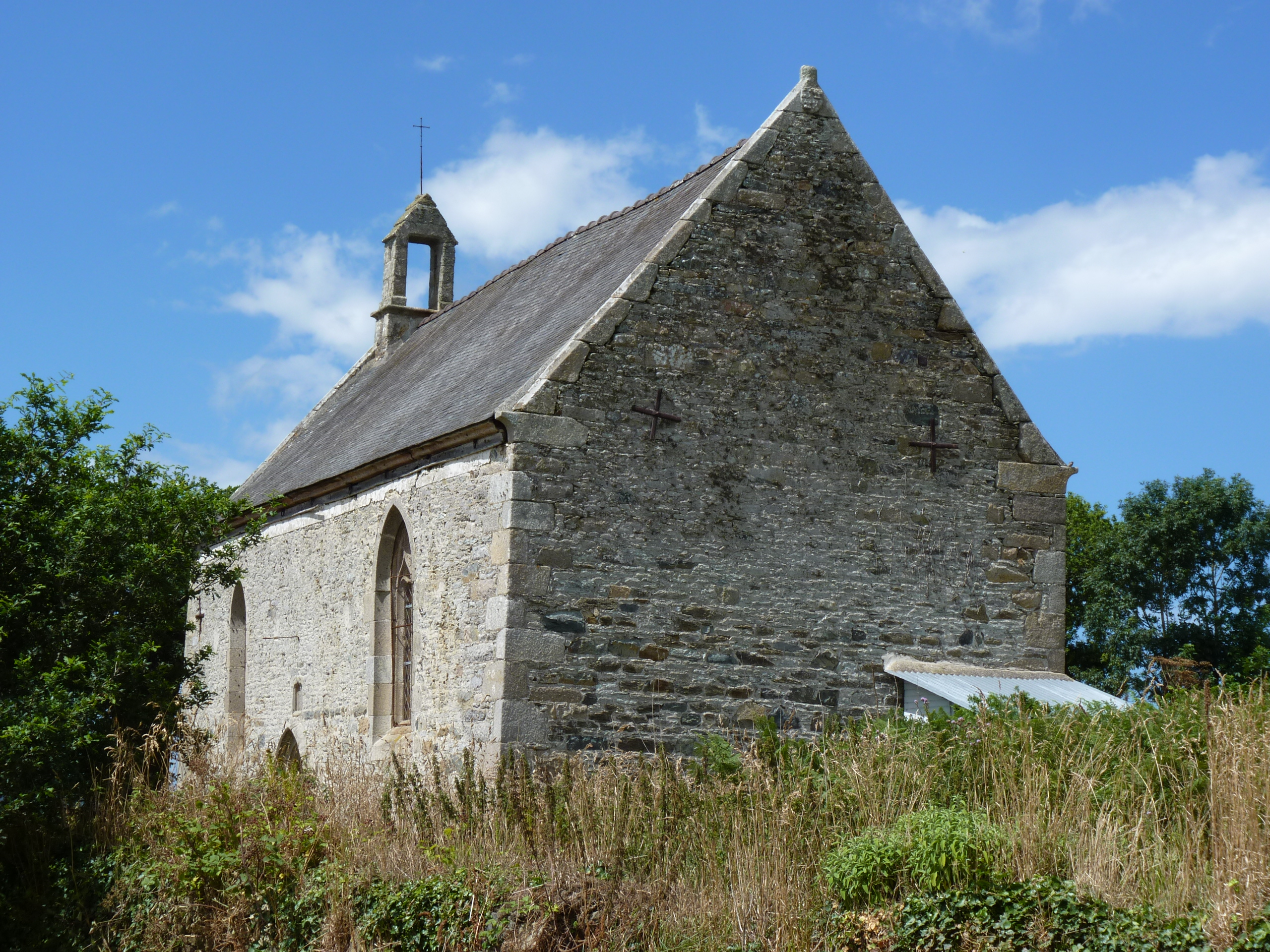
- The chapel of Saint-Nicolas of Kerhir, in Trédarzec
- Location of Trédarzec
- Location within France Location within Brittany
- Coordinates: 48°47′15″N 3°11′56″W
- Country: France
- Region: Brittany
- Department: Côtes-d'Armor
- Arrondissement: Lannion
- Canton: Tréguier
- Intercommunality: Lannion-Trégor Communauté

Government
  - Mayor (2020–2026): Yvon Le Seguillon
- Area^{1}: 11.68 km^{2} (4.51 sq mi)
- Highest elevation: 84 m (276 ft)
- Lowest elevation: 0 m (0 ft)
- Population (2023): 1,055
  - Density: 90.33/km^{2} (233.9/sq mi)
- Time zone: UTC+01:00 (CET)
  - Summer (DST): UTC+02:00 (CEST)
- INSEE/Postal code: 22347 /22220
- ^{1} French Land Register data, which excludes lakes, ponds, glaciers > 1 km^{2} (0.386 sq mi or 247 acres) and river estuaries.

Trédarzec (French pronunciation: [tʁedaʁzɛk]; Breton: Tredarzeg) is a commune in the Côtes-d'Armor department of Brittany in northwestern France.

== Etymology ==
The name is treb = farmstead, tarz = spring.

== Population ==
Historical population
Year	Pop.	±% p.a.
1968	1,128	—
1975	997	−1.75%
1982	1,058	+0.85%
1990	1,023	−0.42%
1999	999	−0.26%
2007	1,088	+1.07%
2012	1,126	+0.69%
2017	1,075	−0.92%
2023	1,055	−0.31%
Source: INSEE

Inhabitants of Trédarzec are called trédarzécois in French.

== International relations ==
Trédarzec is twinned with the village of St. Dogmaels in Pembrokeshire, Wales.

== See also ==
- Communes of the Côtes-d'Armor department
