= Loguivy-Plougras =

Loguivy-Plougras Logivi-Plougraz
- Commune
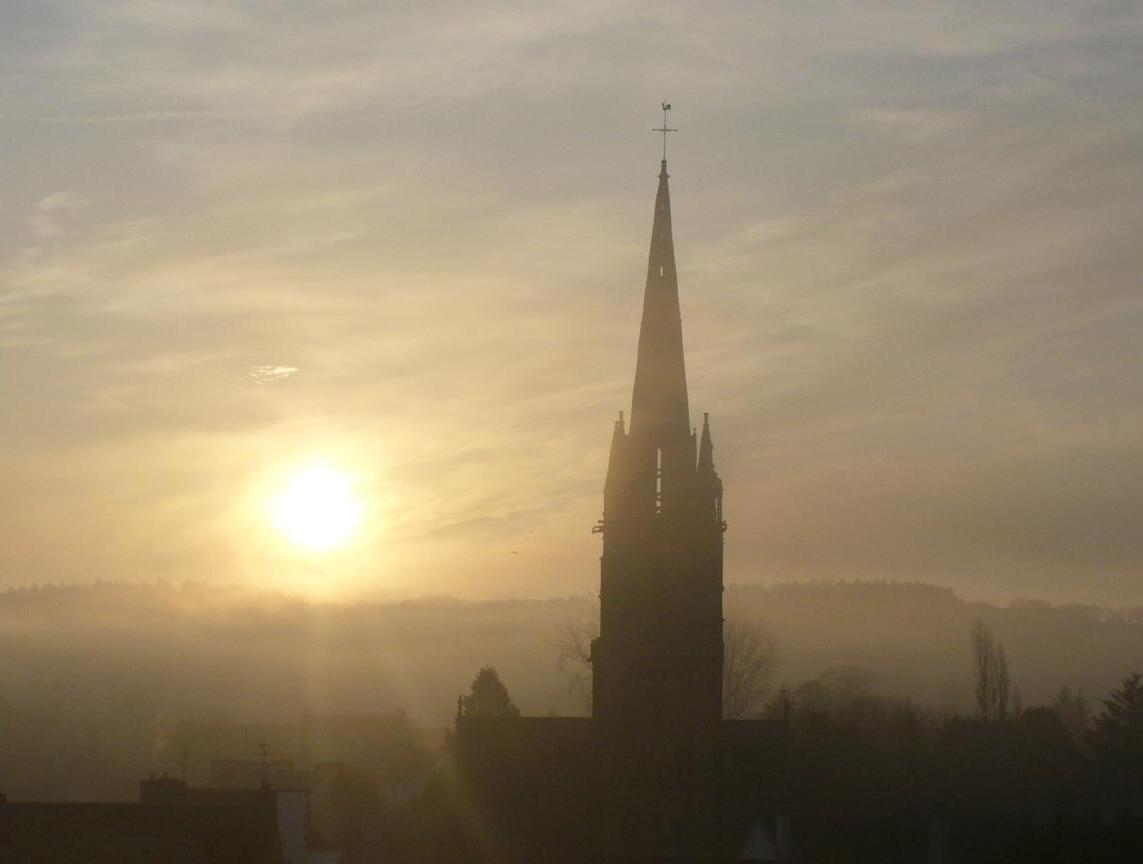
- The church of Saint-Émilion
- Location of Loguivy-Plougras
- Location within France Location within Brittany
- Coordinates: 48°31′22″N 3°29′12″W
- Country: France
- Region: Brittany
- Department: Côtes-d'Armor
- Arrondissement: Lannion
- Canton: Plestin-les-Grèves
- Intercommunality: Lannion-Trégor Communauté

Government
  - Mayor (2020–2026): Jean-François Le Gall
- Area^{1}: 47.68 km^{2} (18.41 sq mi)
- Highest elevation: 321 m (1,053 ft)
- Lowest elevation: 102 m (335 ft)
- Population (2023): 840
  - Density: 18/km^{2} (46/sq mi)
- Time zone: UTC+01:00 (CET)
  - Summer (DST): UTC+02:00 (CEST)
- INSEE/Postal code: 22131 /22780
- ^{1} French Land Register data, which excludes lakes, ponds, glaciers > 1 km^{2} (0.386 sq mi or 247 acres) and river estuaries.

Loguivy-Plougras (French pronunciation: [lɔgivi plugʁas]; Breton: Logivi-Plougraz) is a commune in the Côtes-d'Armor department of Brittany in northwestern France.

== Population ==
Historical population
| Year | Pop. | ±% p.a. |
|---|---|---|
| 1968 | 1,604 | — |
| 1975 | 1,367 | −2.26% |
| 1982 | 1,190 | −1.96% |
| 1990 | 1,021 | −1.90% |
| 1999 | 1,002 | −0.21% |
| 2007 | 964 | −0.48% |
| 2012 | 931 | −0.69% |
| 2017 | 890 | −0.90% |
| 2023 | 840 | −0.96% |
Source: INSEE

Inhabitants of Loguivy-Plougras are called loguiviens in French.

== See also ==
- Communes of the Côtes-d'Armor department
