= Plougras =

Plougras Plougraz
- Commune
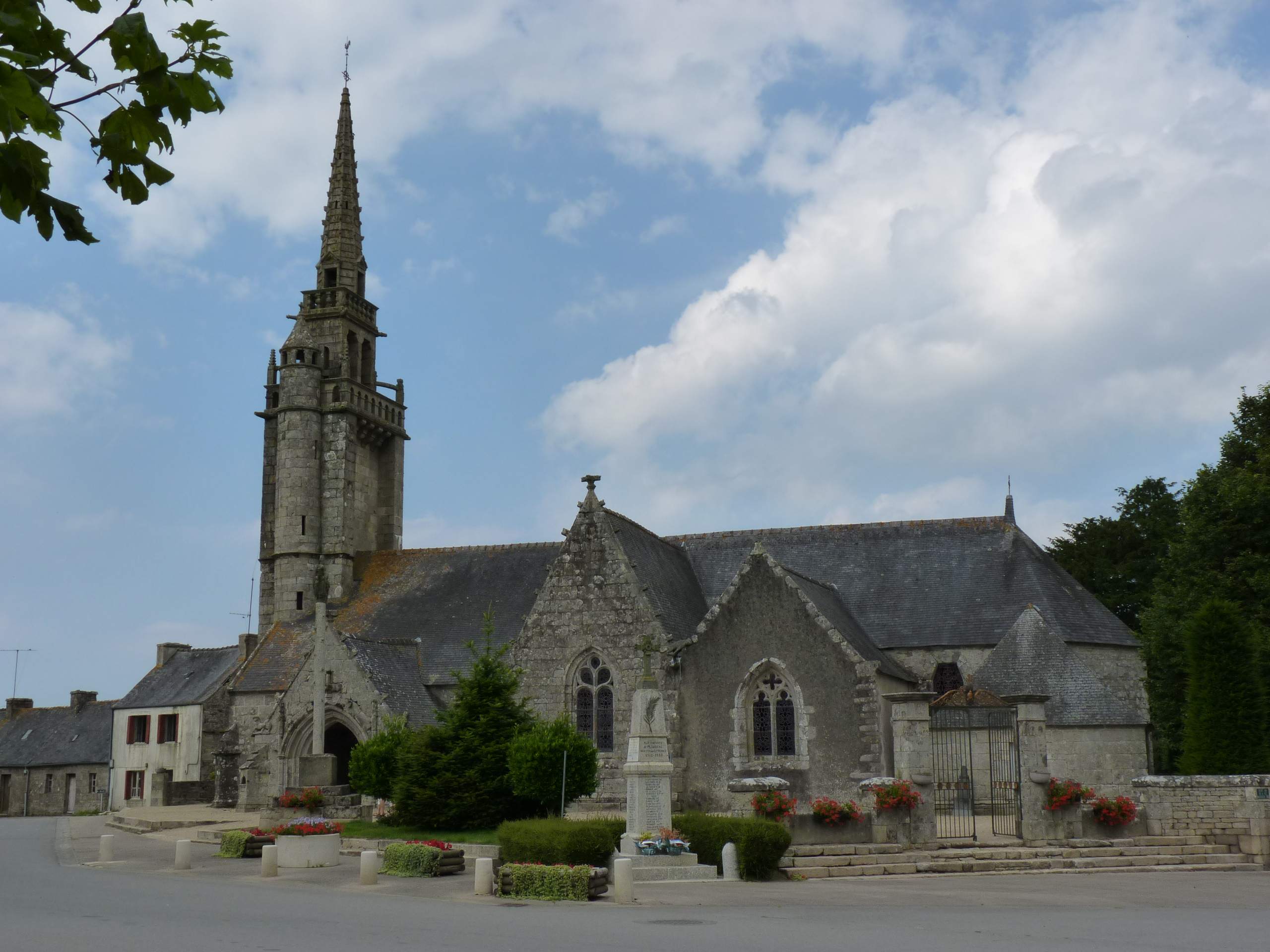
- The church of Saint-Pierre, in Plougras

- Coat of arms
- Location of Plougras
- Location within France Location within Brittany
- Coordinates: 48°30′42″N 3°33′36″W
- Country: France
- Region: Brittany
- Department: Côtes-d'Armor
- Arrondissement: Lannion
- Canton: Plestin-les-Grèves
- Intercommunality: Lannion-Trégor Communauté

Government
  - Mayor (2020–2026): Jean-Claude Quéniat
- Area^{1}: 26.48 km^{2} (10.22 sq mi)
- Highest elevation: 314 m (1,030 ft)
- Lowest elevation: 164 m (538 ft)
- Population (2023): 426
  - Density: 16.1/km^{2} (41.7/sq mi)
- Time zone: UTC+01:00 (CET)
  - Summer (DST): UTC+02:00 (CEST)
- INSEE/Postal code: 22217 /22780
- ^{1} French Land Register data, which excludes lakes, ponds, glaciers > 1 km^{2} (0.386 sq mi or 247 acres) and river estuaries.

Plougras (French pronunciation: [pluɡʁas]; Breton: Plougraz) is a commune in the Côtes-d'Armor département of Brittany in northwestern France.

== Population ==
Historical population
Year	Pop.	±% p.a.
1968	670	—
1975	592	−1.75%
1982	530	−1.57%
1990	498	−0.78%
1999	495	−0.07%
2007	460	−0.91%
2012	427	−1.48%
2017	413	−0.66%
2023	426	+0.52%
Source: INSEE

Inhabitants of Plougras are called plougrasiens in French.

== See also ==
- Communes of the Côtes-d'Armor department
