= Rospez =

Rospez Rospezh
- Commune
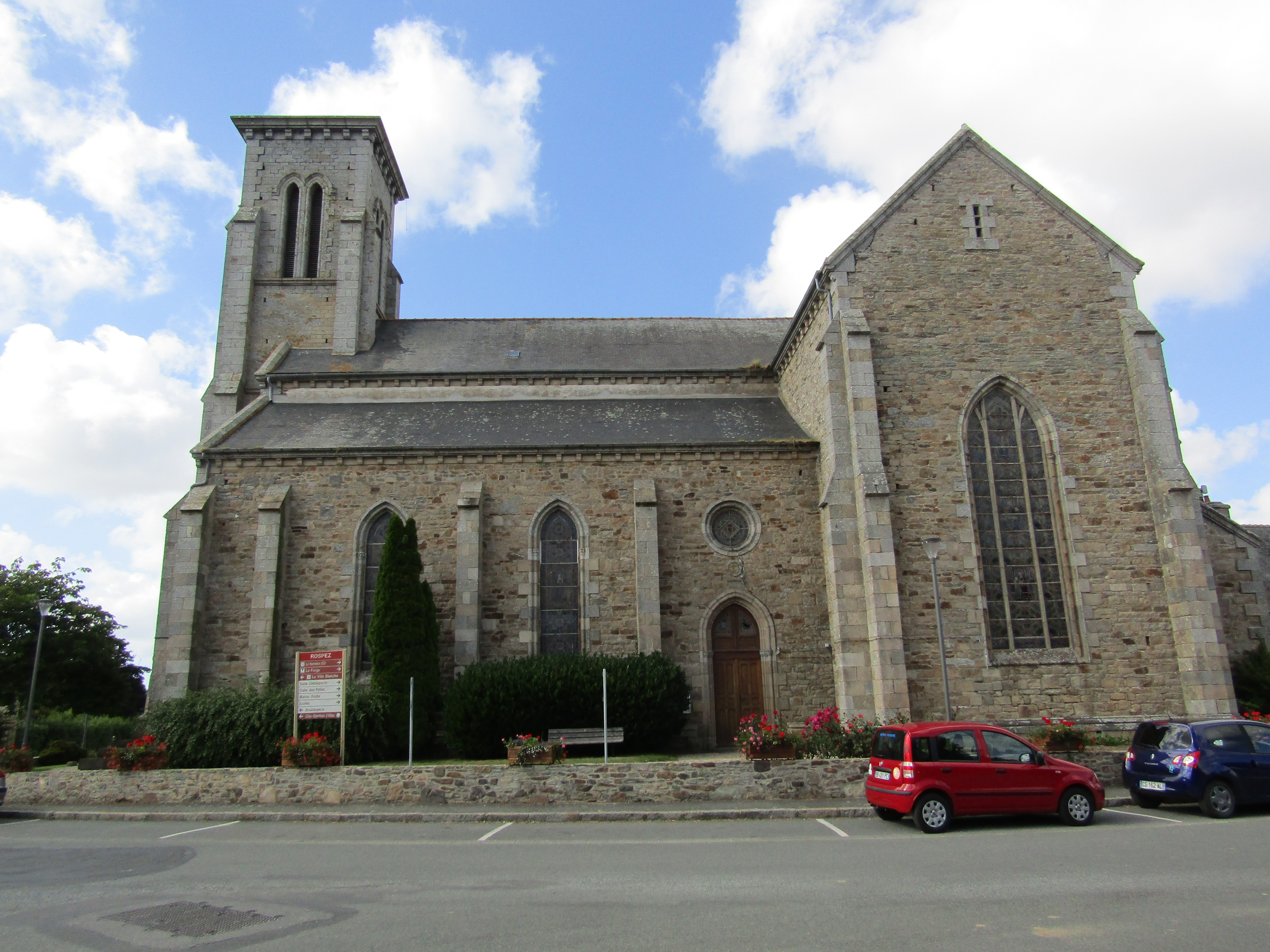
- The church of Saint-Pierre and Saint-Paul, in Rospez
- Location of Rospez
- Location within France Location within Brittany
- Coordinates: 48°43′49″N 3°22′56″W
- Country: France
- Region: Brittany
- Department: Côtes-d'Armor
- Arrondissement: Lannion
- Canton: Lannion
- Intercommunality: Lannion-Trégor Communauté

Government
  - Mayor (2020–2026): Jacques Robin
- Area^{1}: 13.24 km^{2} (5.11 sq mi)
- Highest elevation: 112 m (367 ft)
- Lowest elevation: 31 m (102 ft)
- Population (2023): 1,794
  - Density: 135.5/km^{2} (350.9/sq mi)
- Time zone: UTC+01:00 (CET)
  - Summer (DST): UTC+02:00 (CEST)
- INSEE/Postal code: 22265 /22300
- ^{1} French Land Register data, which excludes lakes, ponds, glaciers > 1 km^{2} (0.386 sq mi or 247 acres) and river estuaries.

Rospez (French pronunciation: [ʁɔspɛs]; Breton: Rospezh) is a commune in the Côtes-d'Armor department of Brittany in northwestern France.

== Population ==
Inhabitants of Rospez are called rospéziens in French.

== Breton language ==
In 2008, 14.02% of primary school children attended bilingual schools.

== See also ==
- Communes of the Côtes-d'Armor department
