= Mantallot =

Mantallot Mantallod
- Commune
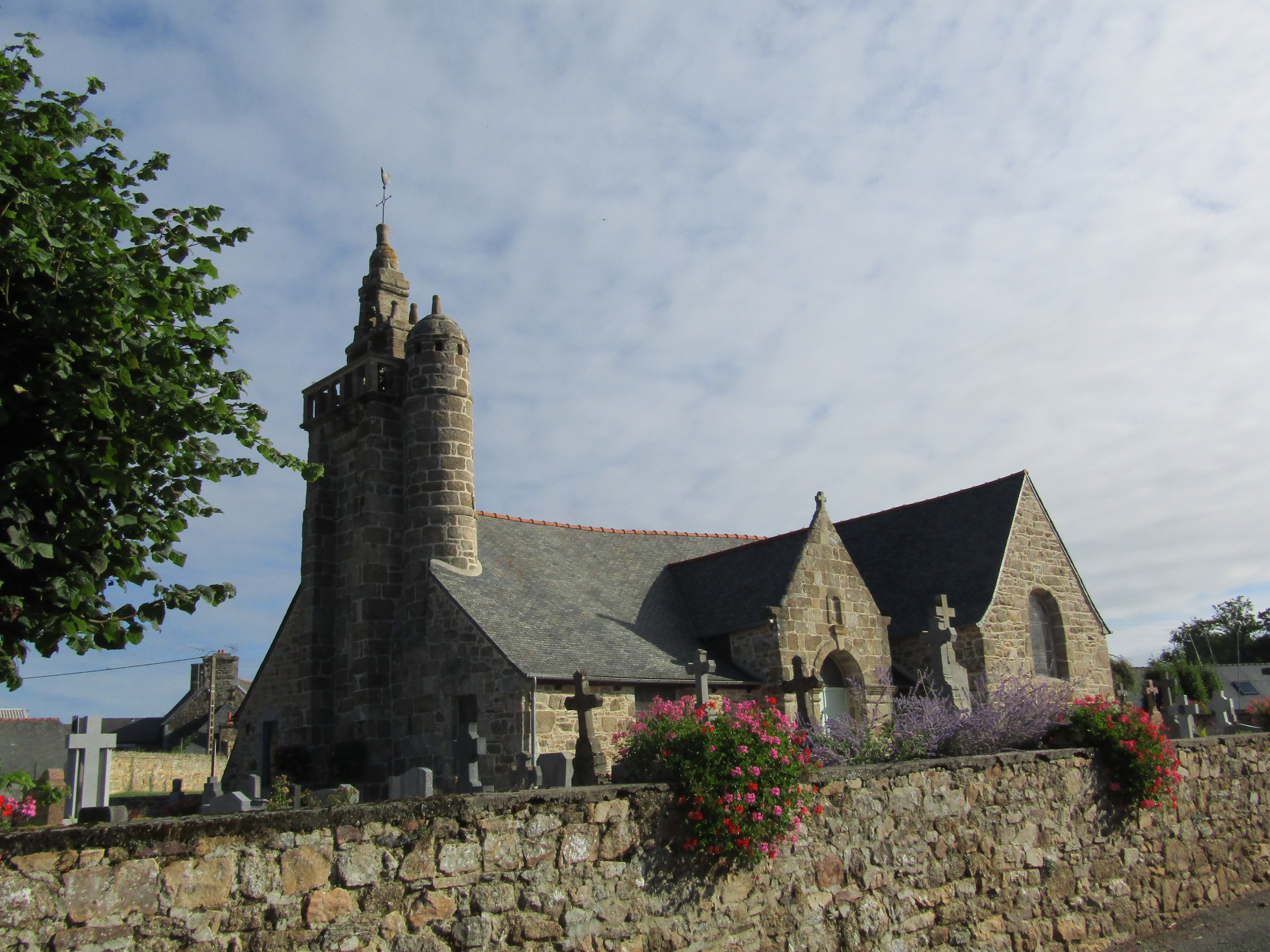
- The church of Saint-Mérin, in Mantallot
- Location of Mantallot
- Location within France Location within Brittany
- Coordinates: 48°42′29″N 3°17′51″W
- Country: France
- Region: Brittany
- Department: Côtes-d'Armor
- Arrondissement: Lannion
- Canton: Bégard
- Intercommunality: Lannion-Trégor Communauté

Government
  - Mayor (2020–2026): Jean Droumaguet
- Area^{1}: 2.76 km^{2} (1.07 sq mi)
- Highest elevation: 87 m (285 ft)
- Lowest elevation: 18 m (59 ft)
- Population (2023): 226
  - Density: 81.9/km^{2} (212/sq mi)
- Time zone: UTC+01:00 (CET)
  - Summer (DST): UTC+02:00 (CEST)
- INSEE/Postal code: 22141 /22450
- ^{1} French Land Register data, which excludes lakes, ponds, glaciers > 1 km^{2} (0.386 sq mi or 247 acres) and river estuaries.

Mantallot (Breton: Mantallod) is a commune in the Côtes-d'Armor department of Brittany in northwestern France.

== Population ==
Historical population
| Year | Pop. | ±% p.a. |
|---|---|---|
| 1968 | 148 | — |
| 1975 | 144 | −0.39% |
| 1982 | 132 | −1.24% |
| 1990 | 163 | +2.67% |
| 1999 | 171 | +0.53% |
| 2007 | 177 | +0.43% |
| 2012 | 217 | +4.16% |
| 2017 | 230 | +1.17% |
| 2023 | 226 | −0.29% |
Source: INSEE

Inhabitants of Mantallot are called mantallotois in French.

== See also ==
- Communes of the Côtes-d'Armor department
