= Plufur =

Plufur Plufur
- Commune
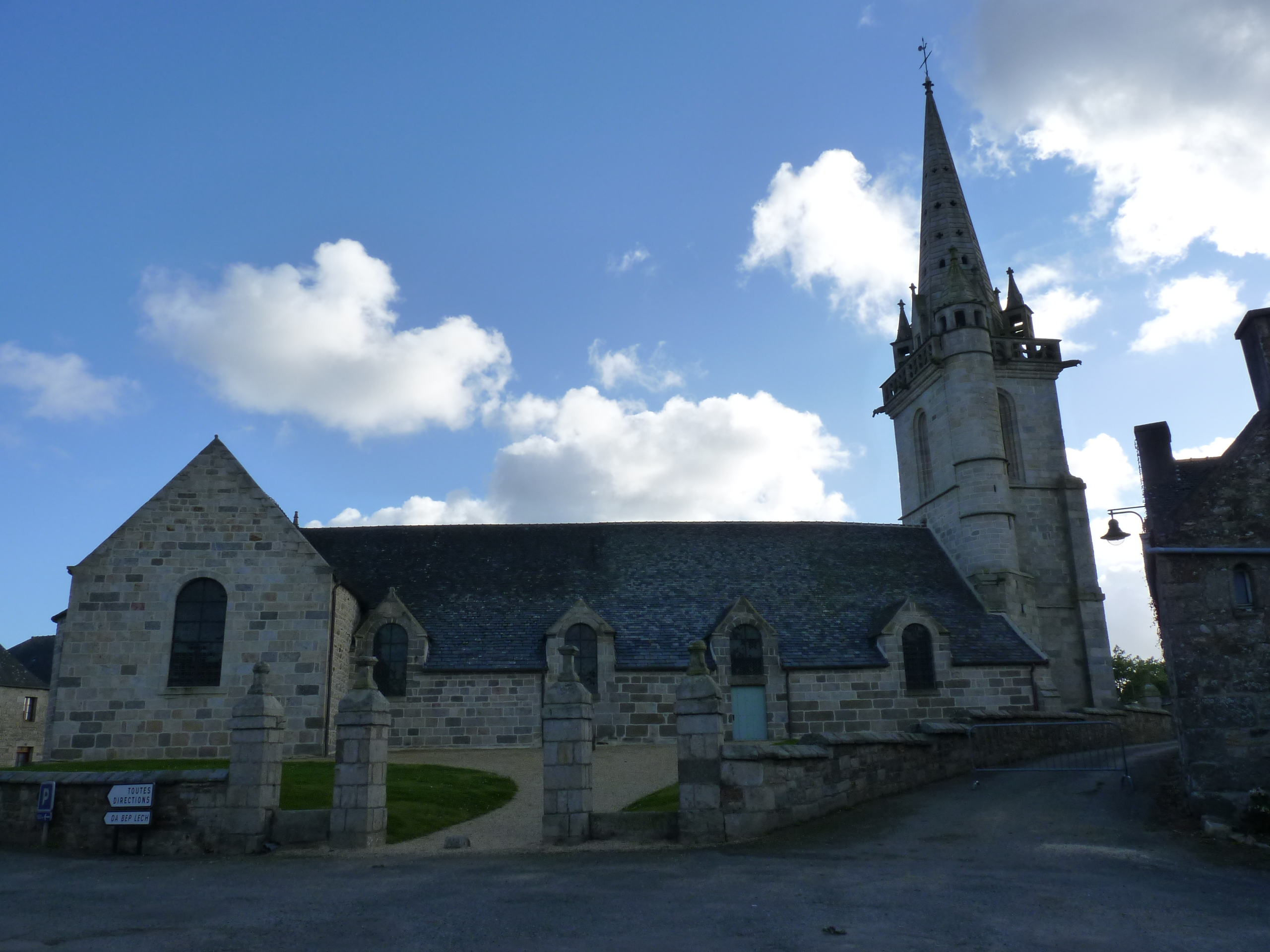
- The church of Saint-Florent, in Plufur

- Coat of arms
- Location of Plufur
- Location within France Location within Brittany
- Coordinates: 48°36′30″N 3°34′22″W
- Country: France
- Region: Brittany
- Department: Côtes-d'Armor
- Arrondissement: Lannion
- Canton: Plestin-les-Grèves
- Intercommunality: Lannion-Trégor Communauté

Government
  - Mayor (2020–2026): Hervé Guélou
- Area^{1}: 17.50 km^{2} (6.76 sq mi)
- Highest elevation: 178 m (584 ft)
- Lowest elevation: 28 m (92 ft)
- Population (2023): 529
  - Density: 30.2/km^{2} (78.3/sq mi)
- Time zone: UTC+01:00 (CET)
  - Summer (DST): UTC+02:00 (CEST)
- INSEE/Postal code: 22238 /22310
- ^{1} French Land Register data, which excludes lakes, ponds, glaciers > 1 km^{2} (0.386 sq mi or 247 acres) and river estuaries.

Plufur (French pronunciation: [plyfyʁ]; Breton: Plufur) is a commune in the Côtes-d'Armor department of Brittany in northwestern France.

== Population ==
Inhabitants of Plufur are called plufuriens or plufurois in French.

== See also ==
- Communes of the Côtes-d'Armor department
