= Troguéry =

Troguéry Trogeri
- Commune
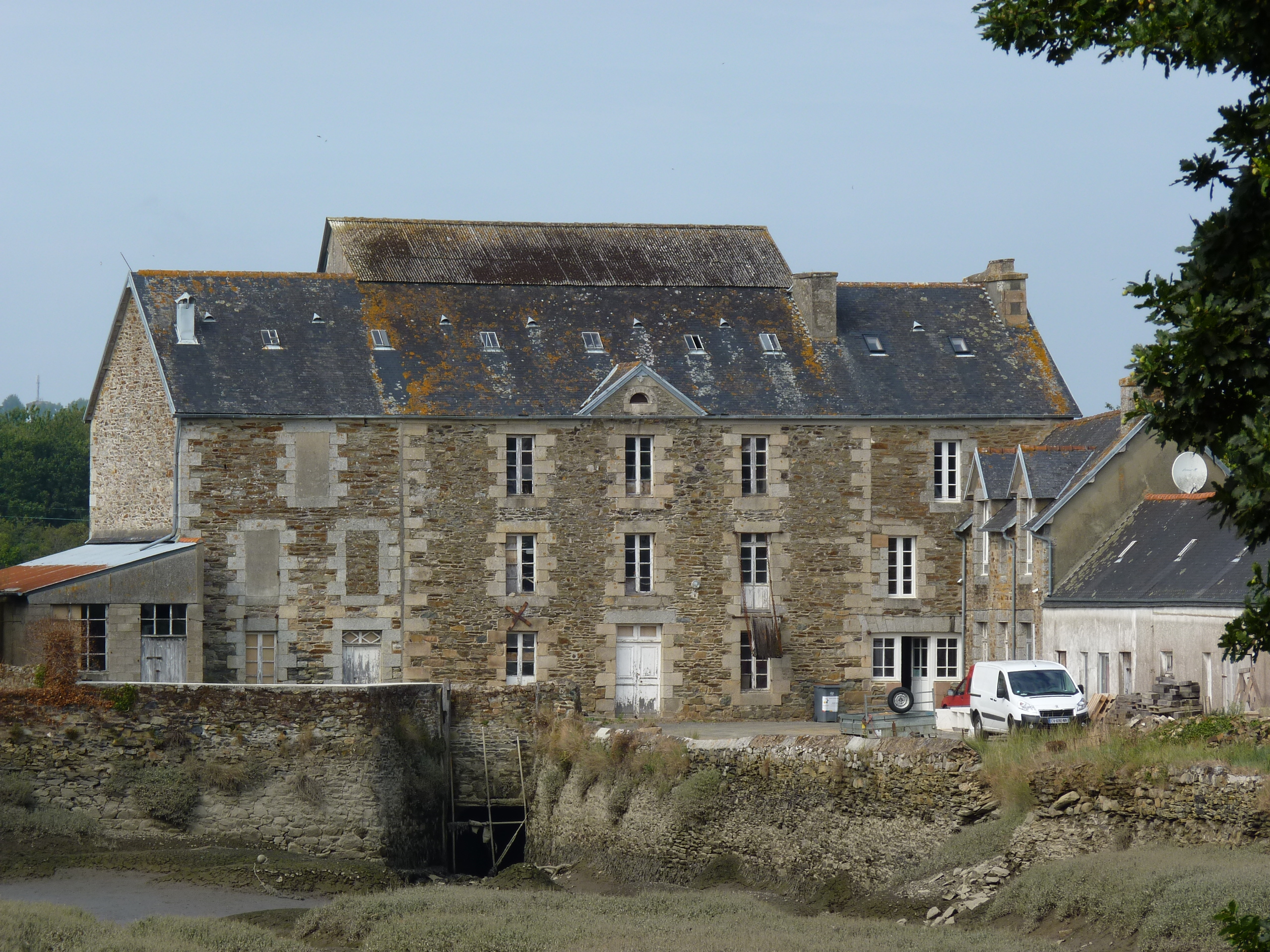
- The mill in Troguéry
- Location of Troguéry
- Location within France Location within Brittany
- Coordinates: 48°45′17″N 3°13′28″W
- Country: France
- Region: Brittany
- Department: Côtes-d'Armor
- Arrondissement: Lannion
- Canton: Tréguier
- Intercommunality: Lannion-Trégor Communauté

Government
  - Mayor (2020–2026): Serge Henry
- Area^{1}: 3.61 km^{2} (1.39 sq mi)
- Highest elevation: 55 m (180 ft)
- Lowest elevation: 0 m (0 ft)
- Population (2023): 227
  - Density: 62.9/km^{2} (163/sq mi)
- Time zone: UTC+01:00 (CET)
  - Summer (DST): UTC+02:00 (CEST)
- INSEE/Postal code: 22383 /22450
- ^{1} French Land Register data, which excludes lakes, ponds, glaciers > 1 km^{2} (0.386 sq mi or 247 acres) and river estuaries.

Troguéry (French pronunciation: [tʁɔɡeʁi]; Breton: Trogeri) is a commune in the Côtes-d'Armor department of Brittany in northwestern France.

== Population ==
Historical population
Year	Pop.	±% p.a.
1968	290	—
1975	238	−2.78%
1982	227	−0.67%
1990	224	−0.17%
1999	233	+0.44%
2007	278	+2.23%
2012	290	+0.85%
2017	249	−3.00%
2023	227	−1.53%
Source: INSEE

People from Troguéry are known in French as troguérois.

== See also ==
- Communes of the Côtes-d'Armor department
