= Pleudaniel =

Pleudaniel Planiel
- Commune
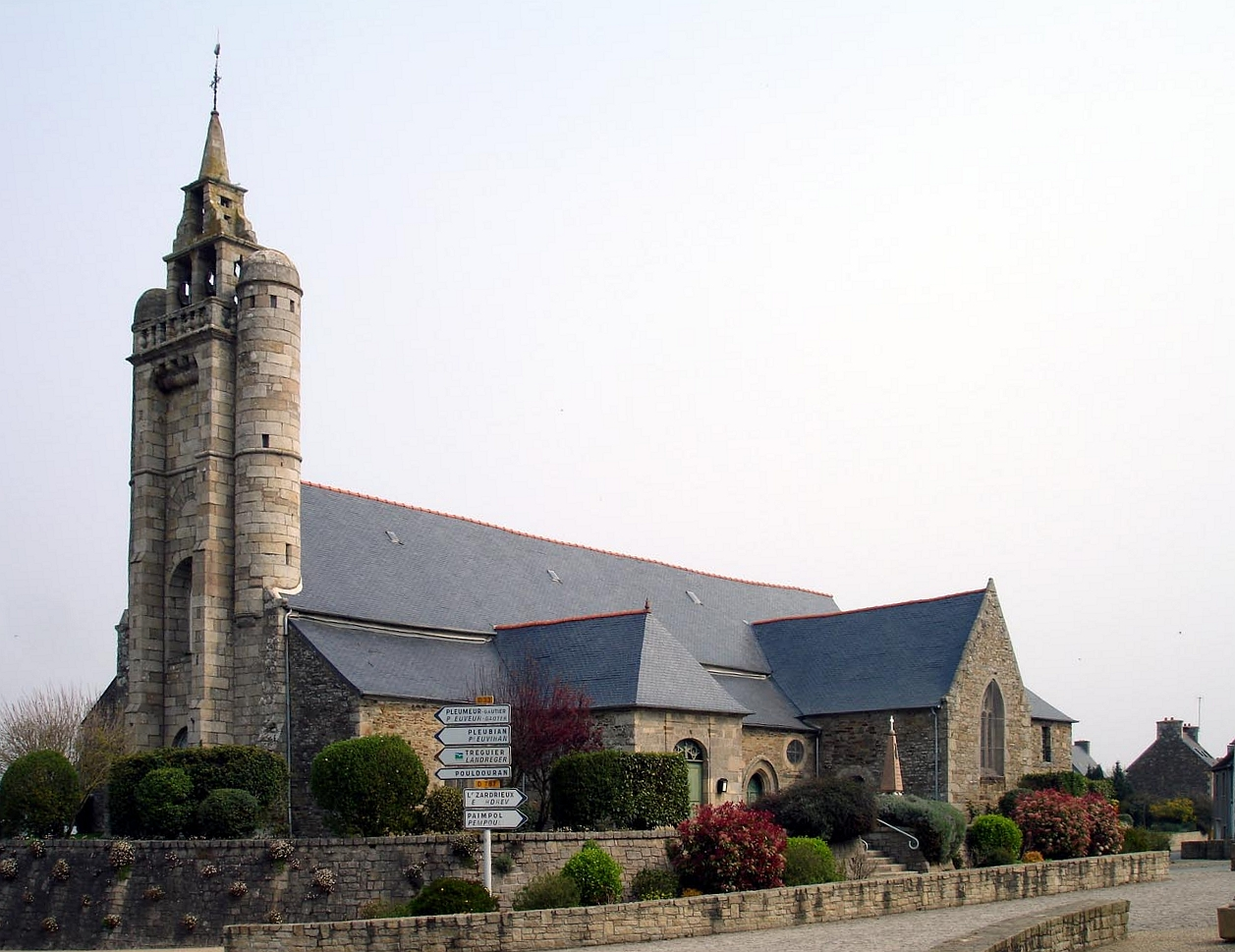
- The church of Pleudaniel
- Location of Pleudaniel
- Location within France Location within Brittany
- Coordinates: 48°46′00″N 3°08′36″W
- Country: France
- Region: Brittany
- Department: Côtes-d'Armor
- Arrondissement: Lannion
- Canton: Tréguier
- Intercommunality: Lannion-Trégor Communauté

Government
  - Mayor (2020–2026): Didier Rogard
- Area^{1}: 18.42 km^{2} (7.11 sq mi)
- Highest elevation: 76 m (249 ft)
- Lowest elevation: 0 m (0 ft)
- Population (2023): 921
  - Density: 50.0/km^{2} (129/sq mi)
- Time zone: UTC+01:00 (CET)
  - Summer (DST): UTC+02:00 (CEST)
- INSEE/Postal code: 22196 /22740
- ^{1} French Land Register data, which excludes lakes, ponds, glaciers > 1 km^{2} (0.386 sq mi or 247 acres) and river estuaries.

Pleudaniel (French pronunciation: [plødanjɛl]; Breton: Planiel) is a commune in the Côtes-d'Armor department of Brittany in northwestern France.

== Population ==
Historical population
Year	Pop.	±% p.a.
1968	1,183	—
1975	973	−2.75%
1982	947	−0.39%
1990	936	−0.15%
1999	996	+0.69%
2007	994	−0.03%
2012	930	−1.32%
2017	928	−0.04%
2023	921	−0.13%
Source: INSEE

Inhabitants of Pleudaniel are called pleudanielais, pleudaniellais or pleudanielois in French.

== International relations ==
Pleudaniel is twinned with:

- Ballinhassig, Republic of Ireland

== See also ==
- Communes of the Côtes-d'Armor department
