= Pleumeur-Gautier =

Pleumeur-Gautier Pleuveur-Gaoter
- Commune
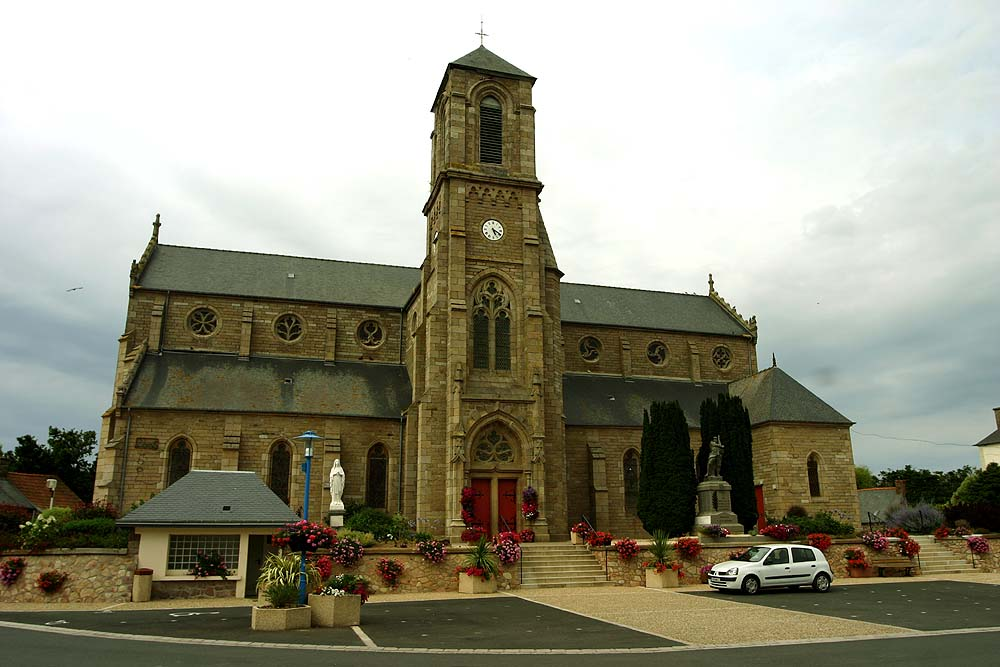
- The church of Saint-Pierre, in Pleumeur-Gautier
- Location of Pleumeur-Gautier
- Location within France Location within Brittany
- Coordinates: 48°48′11″N 3°09′21″W
- Country: France
- Region: Brittany
- Department: Côtes-d'Armor
- Arrondissement: Lannion
- Canton: Tréguier
- Intercommunality: Lannion-Trégor Communauté

Government
  - Mayor (2020–2026): Pierrick Gouronnec
- Area^{1}: 18.99 km^{2} (7.33 sq mi)
- Highest elevation: 86 m (282 ft)
- Lowest elevation: 10 m (33 ft)
- Population (2023): 1,188
  - Density: 62.56/km^{2} (162.0/sq mi)
- Time zone: UTC+01:00 (CET)
  - Summer (DST): UTC+02:00 (CEST)
- INSEE/Postal code: 22199 /22740
- ^{1} French Land Register data, which excludes lakes, ponds, glaciers > 1 km^{2} (0.386 sq mi or 247 acres) and river estuaries.

Pleumeur-Gautier (French pronunciation: [plømœʁ ɡotje]; Breton: Pleuveur-Gaoter) is a commune in the Côtes-d'Armor department of Brittany in northwestern France.

== Population ==
Historical population
Year	Pop.	±% p.a.
1968	1,391	—
1975	1,250	−1.52%
1982	1,161	−1.05%
1990	1,171	+0.11%
1999	1,140	−0.30%
2007	1,139	−0.01%
2012	1,212	+1.25%
2017	1,217	+0.08%
2023	1,188	−0.40%
Source: INSEE

Inhabitants of Pleumeur-Gautier are called pleumeuriens in French.

== See also ==
- Communes of the Côtes-d'Armor department
