= Lézardrieux =

Lézardrieux Lezardrev
- Commune
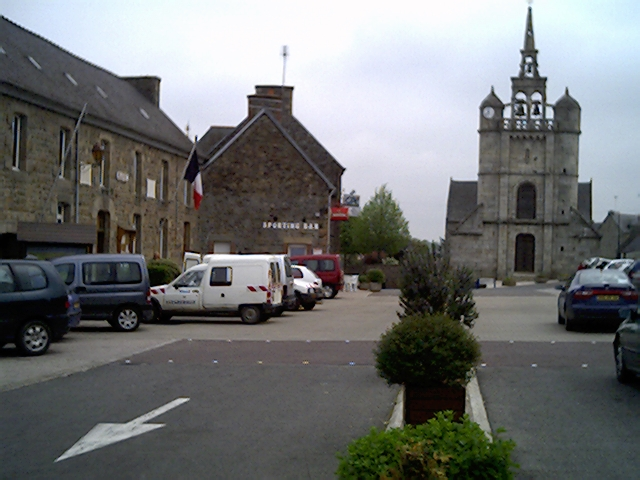
- Church and town hall

- Coat of arms
- Location of Lézardrieux
- Location within France Location within Brittany
- Coordinates: 48°47′09″N 3°06′21″W
- Country: France
- Region: Brittany
- Department: Côtes-d'Armor
- Arrondissement: Lannion
- Canton: Tréguier
- Intercommunality: Lannion-Trégor Communauté

Government
  - Mayor (2021–2026): Henri Paranthoën
- Area^{1}: 11.91 km^{2} (4.60 sq mi)
- Highest elevation: 82 m (269 ft)
- Lowest elevation: 0 m (0 ft)
- Population (2023): 1,623
  - Density: 136.3/km^{2} (352.9/sq mi)
- Time zone: UTC+01:00 (CET)
  - Summer (DST): UTC+02:00 (CEST)
- INSEE/Postal code: 22127 /22740
- ^{1} French Land Register data, which excludes lakes, ponds, glaciers > 1 km^{2} (0.386 sq mi or 247 acres) and river estuaries.

Lézardrieux (French pronunciation: [lezaʁdʁijø]; Breton: Lezardrev) is a commune in the Côtes-d'Armor department of Brittany in northwestern France.

The village is situated near the mouth of the estuary of the Trieux river - the suspension bridge (Pont de Lézardrieux) across the river at this point is a French national monument. The Lézardrieux marina is a natural deep-water harbor located in the Trieux estuary. It has a capacity of 542 berths on pontoons and 199 moorings.

The Lézardrieux marina also offers a visitor area with 43 berths. The marina can accommodate boats up to 25 meters in length and with a maximum draft of 3 meters.

There are a variety of shops and other commercial enterprises - including two bakeries, a butcher and, several restaurants and bars.

== Population ==
Historical population
| Year | Pop. | ±% p.a. |
|---|---|---|
| 1968 | 1,842 | — |
| 1975 | 1,834 | −0.06% |
| 1982 | 1,859 | +0.19% |
| 1990 | 1,707 | −1.06% |
| 1999 | 1,629 | −0.52% |
| 2007 | 1,603 | −0.20% |
| 2012 | 1,603 | +0.00% |
| 2017 | 1,474 | −1.66% |
| 2023 | 1,623 | +1.62% |
Source: INSEE

Inhabitants of Lézardrieux are called lézardriviens in French.

== Events ==
The village hosts a music festival in late May and several regattas depart from the port.

== Personalities ==
Notable figures associated with the village are Paul Le Flem (composer) and Georges Brassens (musician and poet).

== See also ==
- Communes of the Côtes-d'Armor department
