= Langoat =

Langoat Langoad
- Commune
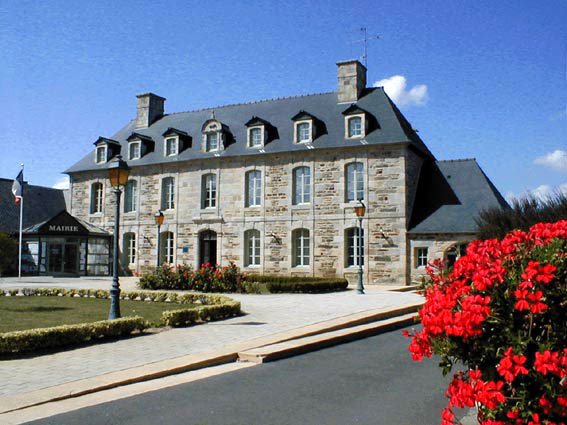
- Langoat Town hall
- Location of Langoat
- Location within France Location within Brittany
- Coordinates: 48°45′05″N 3°16′47″W
- Country: France
- Region: Brittany
- Department: Côtes-d'Armor
- Arrondissement: Lannion
- Canton: Tréguier
- Intercommunality: Lannion-Trégor Communauté

Government
  - Mayor (2020–2026): Hervé Delisle
- Area^{1}: 18.50 km^{2} (7.14 sq mi)
- Highest elevation: 89 m (292 ft)
- Lowest elevation: 2 m (6.6 ft)
- Population (2023): 1,175
  - Density: 63.51/km^{2} (164.5/sq mi)
- Time zone: UTC+01:00 (CET)
  - Summer (DST): UTC+02:00 (CEST)
- INSEE/Postal code: 22101 /22450
- ^{1} French Land Register data, which excludes lakes, ponds, glaciers > 1 km^{2} (0.386 sq mi or 247 acres) and river estuaries.

Langoat (French pronunciation: [lɑ̃ɡwat]; Breton: Langoad) is a commune in the Côtes-d'Armor department of Brittany in northwestern France.

== Population ==
Historical population
Year	Pop.	±% p.a.
1968	1,062	—
1975	941	−1.71%
1982	894	−0.73%
1990	942	+0.66%
1999	1,057	+1.29%
2007	1,138	+0.93%
2012	1,128	−0.18%
2017	1,154	+0.46%
2023	1,175	+0.30%
Source: INSEE

Inhabitants of Langoat are called langoatais in French.

== History ==
The local church was founded by Saint Pompeia in the 6th century.

== See also ==
- Communes of the Côtes-d'Armor department
