= Minihy-Tréguier =

Minihy-Tréguier Ar Vinic'hi
- Commune
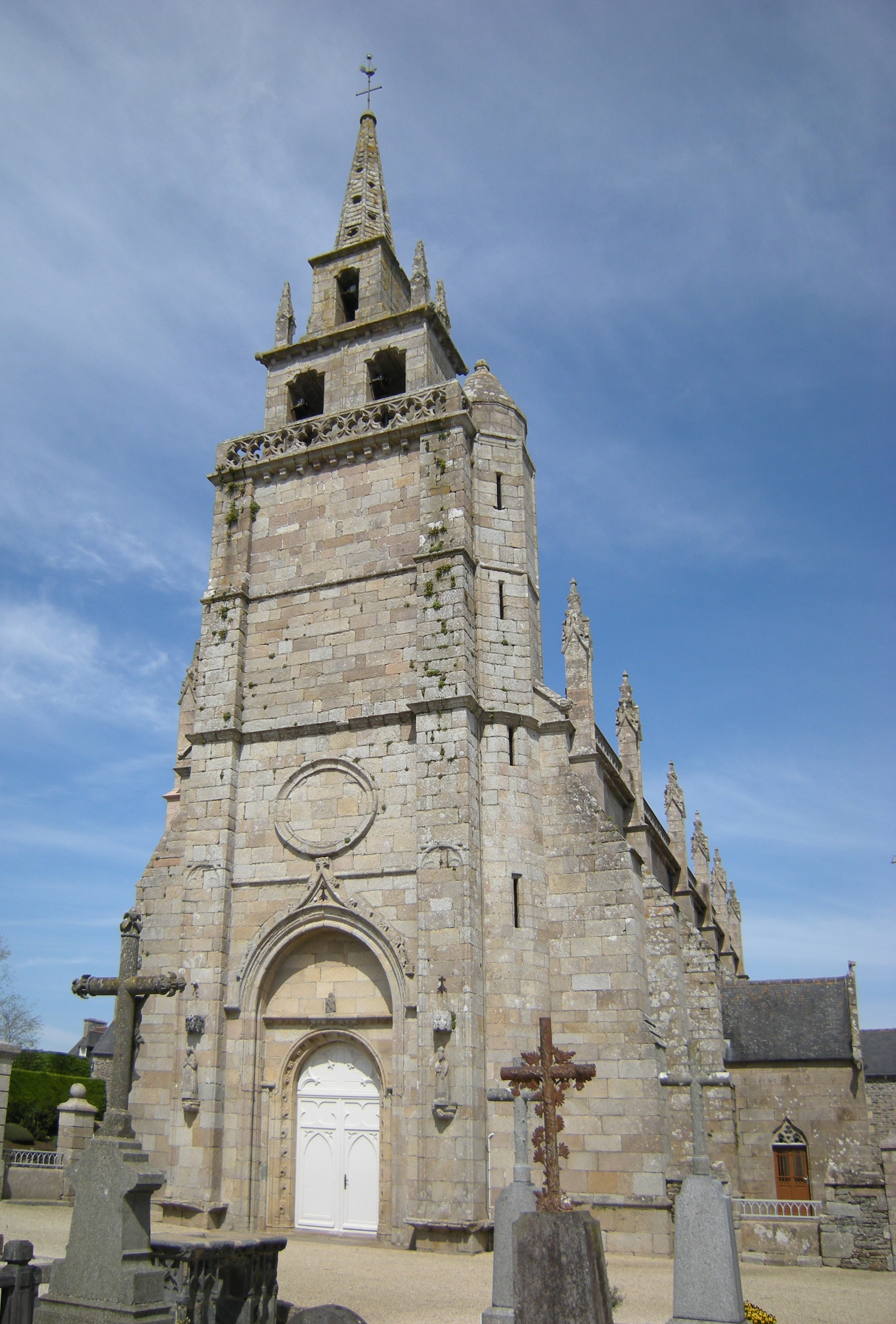
- The church of Saint-Yves
- Location of Minihy-Tréguier
- Location within France Location within Brittany
- Coordinates: 48°46′34″N 3°13′37″W
- Country: France
- Region: Brittany
- Department: Côtes-d'Armor
- Arrondissement: Lannion
- Canton: Tréguier
- Intercommunality: Lannion-Trégor Communauté

Government
  - Mayor (2020–2026): Christian Le Roi
- Area^{1}: 12.07 km^{2} (4.66 sq mi)
- Highest elevation: 67 m (220 ft)
- Lowest elevation: 0 m (0 ft)
- Population (2023): 1,271
  - Density: 105.3/km^{2} (272.7/sq mi)
- Time zone: UTC+01:00 (CET)
  - Summer (DST): UTC+02:00 (CEST)
- INSEE/Postal code: 22152 /22220
- ^{1} French Land Register data, which excludes lakes, ponds, glaciers > 1 km^{2} (0.386 sq mi or 247 acres) and river estuaries.

Minihy-Tréguier (French pronunciation: [mini.i tʁeɡje]; Breton: Ar Vinic'hi) is a commune in the Côtes-d'Armor department of Brittany in northwestern France.

== Population ==
Historical population
Year	Pop.	±% p.a.
1968	717	—
1975	673	−0.90%
1982	790	+2.32%
1990	1,024	+3.30%
1999	1,063	+0.42%
2007	1,093	+0.35%
2012	1,218	+2.19%
2017	1,267	+0.79%
2023	1,271	+0.05%
Source: INSEE

== See also ==
- Communes of the Côtes-d'Armor department
