= Kerbors =

Kerbors Kerborzh
- Commune
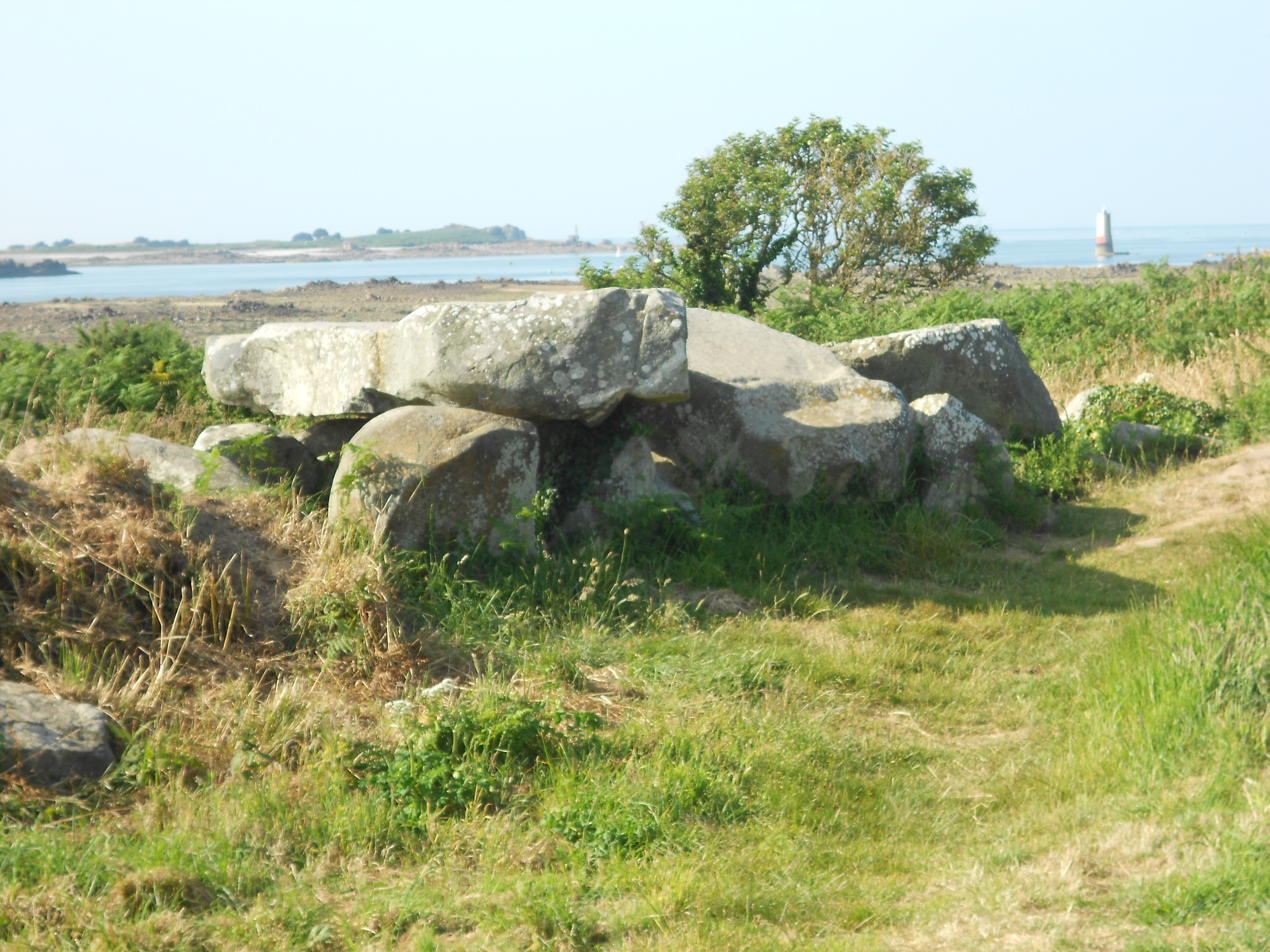
- The allée couverte of Men-ar-Rumpet
- Location of Kerbors
- Location within France Location within Brittany
- Coordinates: 48°49′43″N 3°10′55″W
- Country: France
- Region: Brittany
- Department: Côtes-d'Armor
- Arrondissement: Lannion
- Canton: Tréguier
- Intercommunality: Lannion-Trégor Communauté

Government
  - Mayor (2020–2026): Gildas Le Béver
- Area^{1}: 6.88 km^{2} (2.66 sq mi)
- Highest elevation: 70 m (230 ft)
- Lowest elevation: 0 m (0 ft)
- Population (2023): 292
  - Density: 42.4/km^{2} (110/sq mi)
- Time zone: UTC+01:00 (CET)
  - Summer (DST): UTC+02:00 (CEST)
- INSEE/Postal code: 22085 /22610
- ^{1} French Land Register data, which excludes lakes, ponds, glaciers > 1 km^{2} (0.386 sq mi or 247 acres) and river estuaries.

Kerbors (French pronunciation: [kɛʁbɔʁs]; Breton: Kerborzh) is a commune in the Côtes-d'Armor department of Brittany in northwestern France.

== Population ==
Inhabitants of Kerbors are called kerborziens in French.

Historical population
| Year | Pop. | ±% p.a. |
|---|---|---|
| 1968 | 427 | — |
| 1975 | 368 | −2.10% |
| 1982 | 318 | −2.06% |
| 1990 | 321 | +0.12% |
| 1999 | 329 | +0.27% |
| 2007 | 340 | +0.41% |
| 2012 | 310 | −1.83% |
| 2017 | 305 | −0.32% |
| 2023 | 292 | −0.72% |
Source: INSEE

== See also ==
- Communes of the Côtes-d'Armor department
