= Trézény =

Trézény Trezeni
- Commune
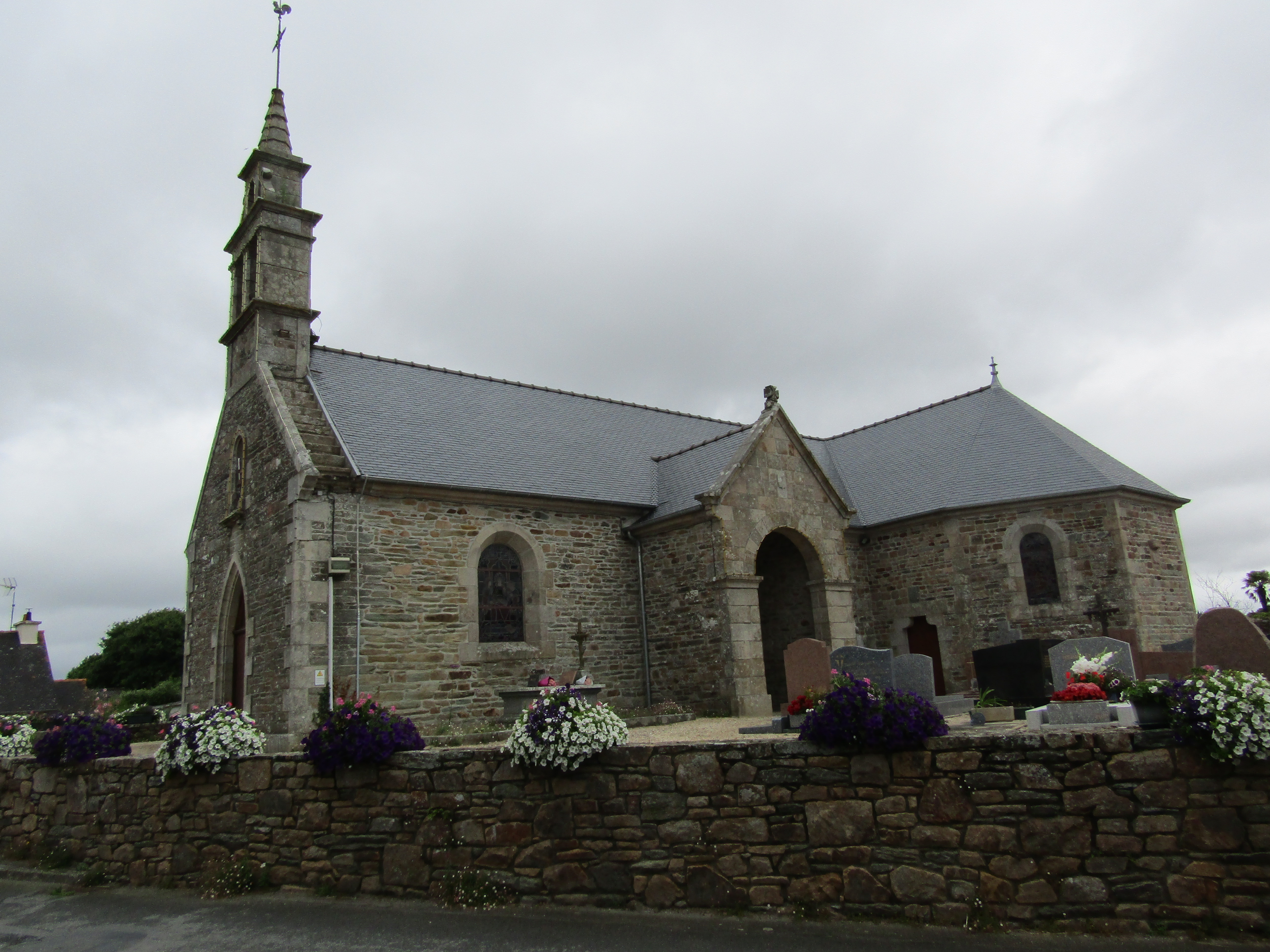
- The church of Saint-Zény, in Trézény
- Location of Trézény
- Location within France Location within Brittany
- Coordinates: 48°45′30″N 3°21′53″W
- Country: France
- Region: Brittany
- Department: Côtes-d'Armor
- Arrondissement: Lannion
- Canton: Tréguier
- Intercommunality: Lannion-Trégor Communauté

Government
  - Mayor (2021–2026): Yves Peurou
- Area^{1}: 3.25 km^{2} (1.25 sq mi)
- Highest elevation: 105 m (344 ft)
- Lowest elevation: 29 m (95 ft)
- Population (2023): 354
  - Density: 109/km^{2} (282/sq mi)
- Time zone: UTC+01:00 (CET)
  - Summer (DST): UTC+02:00 (CEST)
- INSEE/Postal code: 22381 /22450
- ^{1} French Land Register data, which excludes lakes, ponds, glaciers > 1 km^{2} (0.386 sq mi or 247 acres) and river estuaries.

Trézény (French pronunciation: [tʁezeni]; Breton: Trezeni) is a commune in the Côtes-d'Armor department of Brittany in northwestern France.

== Population ==
Historical population
Year	Pop.	±% p.a.
1968	187	—
1975	198	+0.82%
1982	220	+1.52%
1990	304	+4.13%
1999	272	−1.23%
2007	265	−0.33%
2012	357	+6.14%
2017	356	−0.06%
2023	354	−0.09%
Source: INSEE

== See also ==
- Communes of the Côtes-d'Armor department
