= Plouzélambre =

Plouzélambre Plouzelambr
- Commune
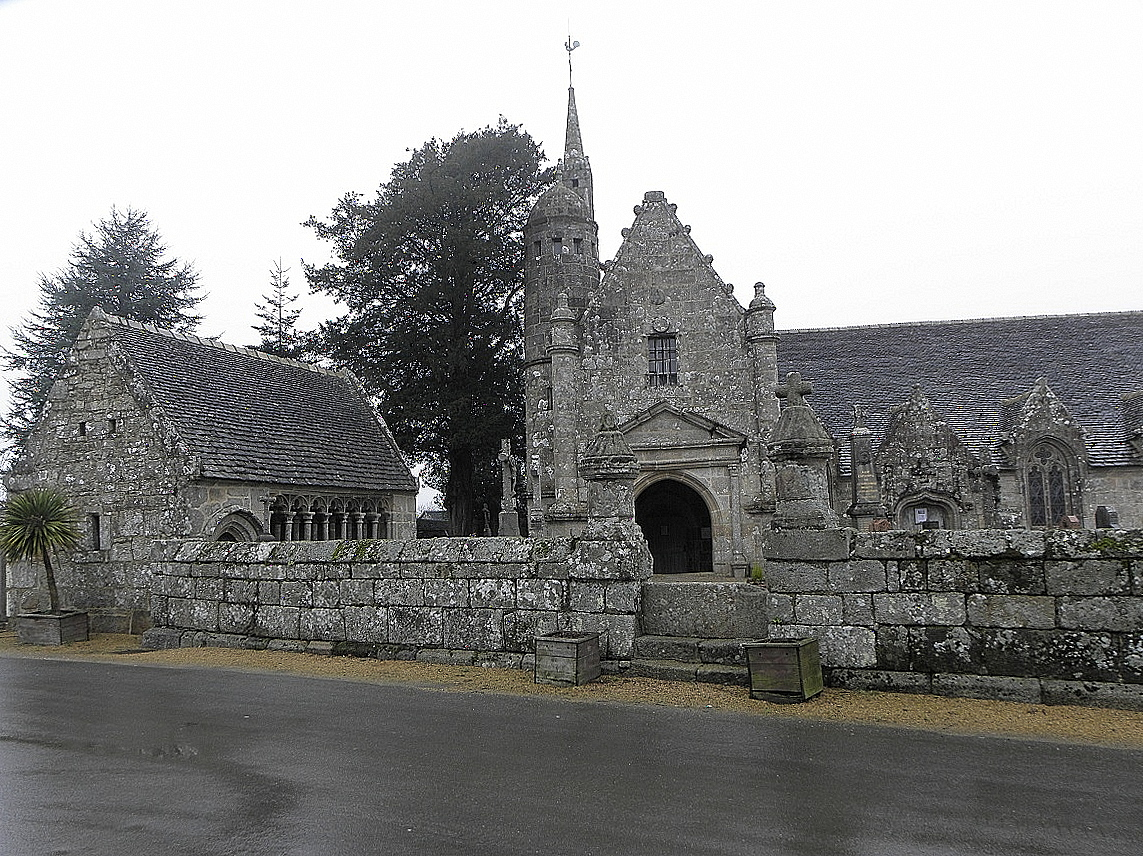
- The church of Saint-Sylvestre, in Plouzélambre
- Location of Plouzélambre
- Location within France Location within Brittany
- Coordinates: 48°38′36″N 3°32′27″W
- Country: France
- Region: Brittany
- Department: Côtes-d'Armor
- Arrondissement: Lannion
- Canton: Plestin-les-Grèves
- Intercommunality: Lannion-Trégor Communauté

Government
  - Mayor (2020–2026): André Coënt
- Area^{1}: 7.84 km^{2} (3.03 sq mi)
- Highest elevation: 126 m (413 ft)
- Lowest elevation: 35 m (115 ft)
- Population (2023): 198
  - Density: 25.3/km^{2} (65.4/sq mi)
- Time zone: UTC+01:00 (CET)
  - Summer (DST): UTC+02:00 (CEST)
- INSEE/Postal code: 22235 /22420
- ^{1} French Land Register data, which excludes lakes, ponds, glaciers > 1 km^{2} (0.386 sq mi or 247 acres) and river estuaries.

Plouzélambre (French pronunciation: [pluzelɑ̃bʁ]; Breton: Plouzelambr) is a commune in the Côtes-d'Armor department of Brittany in northwestern France.

== See also ==
- Communes of the Côtes-d'Armor department
