= Tréguier =

Tréguier Landreger (Breton)
- Commune
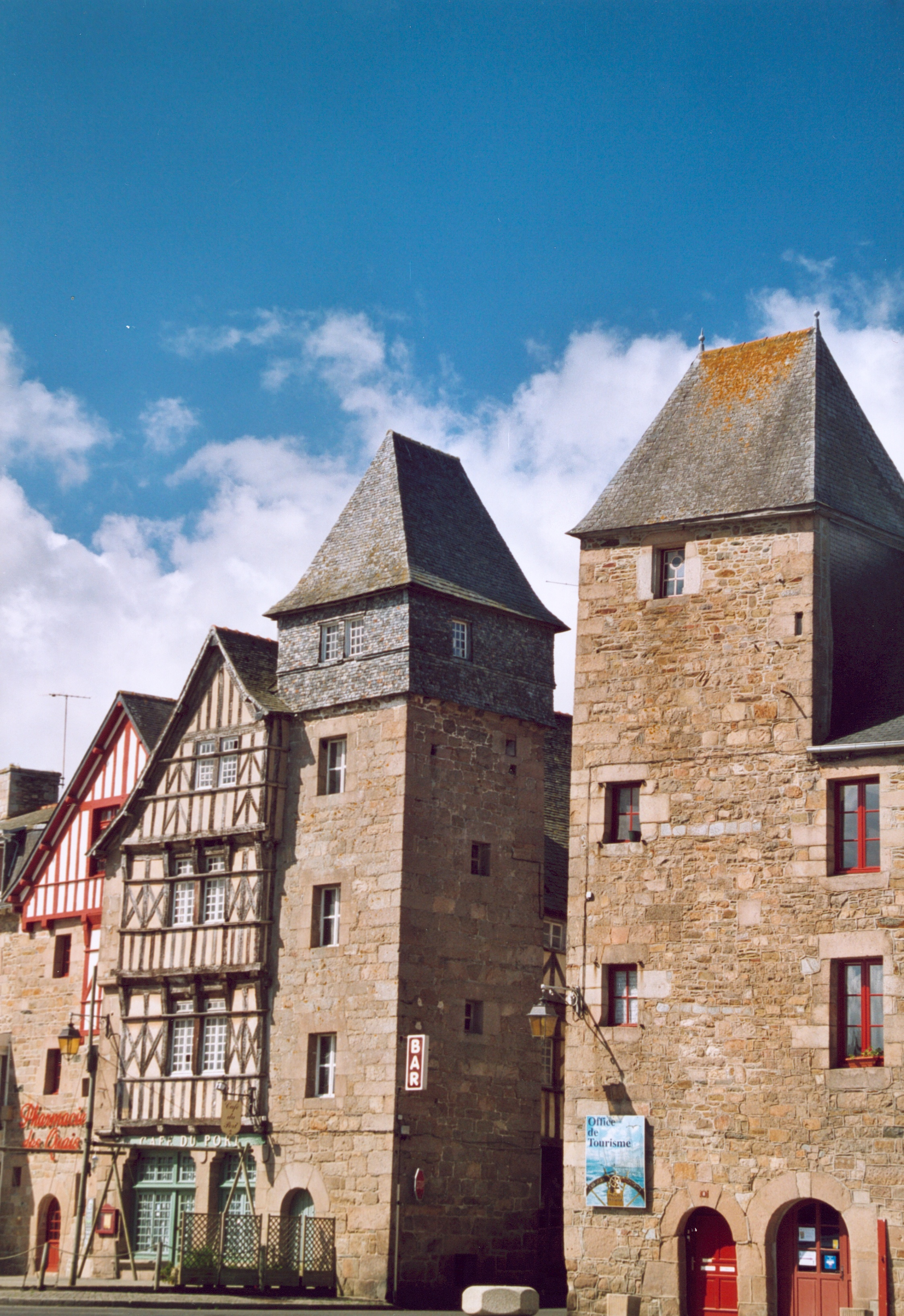
- Entrance of the old town

- Coat of arms
- Location of Tréguier
- Location within France Location within Brittany
- Coordinates: 48°47′09″N 3°13′52″W
- Country: France
- Region: Brittany
- Department: Côtes-d'Armor
- Arrondissement: Lannion
- Canton: Tréguier
- Intercommunality: Lannion-Trégor Communauté

Government
  - Mayor (2020–2026): Guirec Arhant
- Area^{1}: 1.52 km^{2} (0.59 sq mi)
- Highest elevation: 66 m (217 ft)
- Lowest elevation: 0 m (0 ft)
- Population (2023): 2,294
  - Density: 1,510/km^{2} (3,910/sq mi)
- Time zone: UTC+01:00 (CET)
  - Summer (DST): UTC+02:00 (CEST)
- INSEE/Postal code: 22362 /22220
- ^{1} French Land Register data, which excludes lakes, ponds, glaciers > 1 km^{2} (0.386 sq mi or 247 acres) and river estuaries.

Tréguier (French pronunciation: [tʁegje]; Breton: Landreger) is a port town in the French department of Côtes-d'Armor, Brittany, northwestern France. It is the capital town of the province of Trégor.

== Geography ==
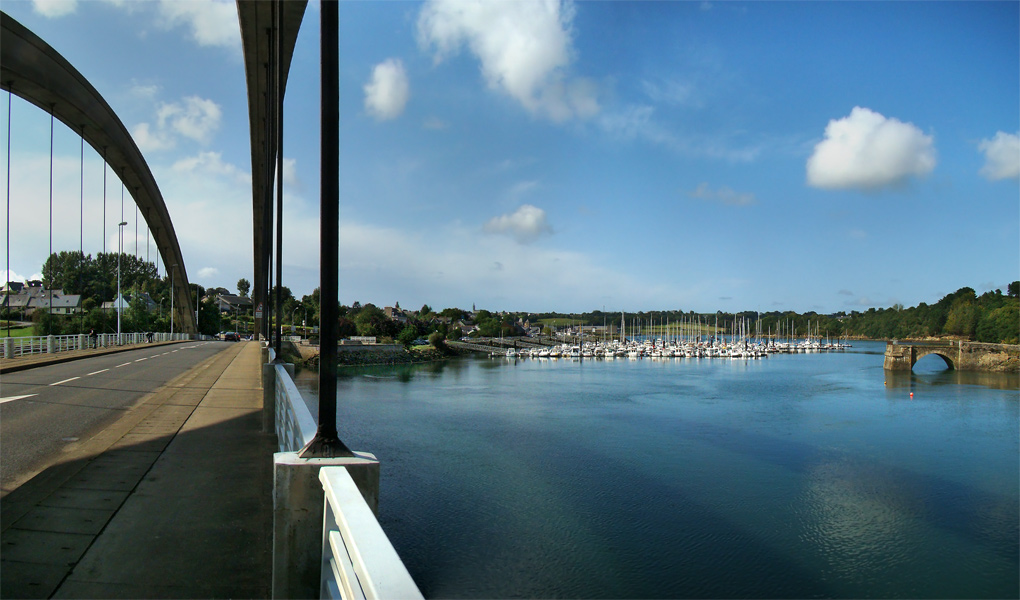
On the Jaudy stream

Tréguier is located 36 m. N.W. of Saint-Brieuc by road. The port is situated about 5½ m. from the English Channel at the confluence of two streams that form the Tréguier River.

== History ==
Tréguier (Trecorum), which dates from the sixth century, grew up round a monastery founded by Saint Tudwal (died c. 564). In the 9th century it became the seat of a bishopric, suppressed on July 12, 1790 (decree of November 14, 1789).

== Population ==
Inhabitants of Tréguier are called trécorrois in French.

Historical population

Year	Pop.	±% p.a.
1793	3,064	—
1800	2,604	−2.30%
1806	2,795	+1.19%
1821	3,080	+0.65%
1831	3,178	+0.31%
1836	3,079	−0.63%
1841	3,382	+1.89%
1846	3,798	+2.35%
1851	3,008	−4.56%
1856	3,472	+2.91%
1861	3,598	+0.72%
1866	3,643	+0.25%
1872	3,815	+0.77%
1876	3,611	−1.36%
1881	3,125	−2.85%
1886	3,193	+0.43%
1891	2,763	−2.85%
1896	3,051	+2.00%
1901	3,297	+1.56%

Year	Pop.	±% p.a.
1906	3,028	−1.69%
1911	2,973	−0.37%
1921	3,040	+0.22%
1926	3,019	−0.14%
1931	3,013	−0.04%
1936	3,090	+0.51%
1946	2,992	−0.32%
1954	3,432	+1.73%
1962	2,885	−2.15%
1968	3,059	+0.98%
1975	3,257	+0.90%
1982	3,130	−0.57%
1990	2,799	−1.39%
1999	2,679	−0.49%
2007	2,668	−0.05%
2012	2,559	−0.83%
2017	2,419	−1.12%
2023	2,294	−0.88%

Source: EHESS and INSEE (1968-2023)

== Breton language ==
In 2008, 11.78% of primary school children attended bilingual schools.

== History ==
Count Stephen of Tréguier was the second Earl of Richmond, inheriting the British peerage created by William the Conqueror for his second cousin Alan Rufus.

The United States Navy established a naval air station on 1 November 1918 to operate seaplanes during World War I. The base closed shortly after the First Armistice at Compiègne.

== Sights ==
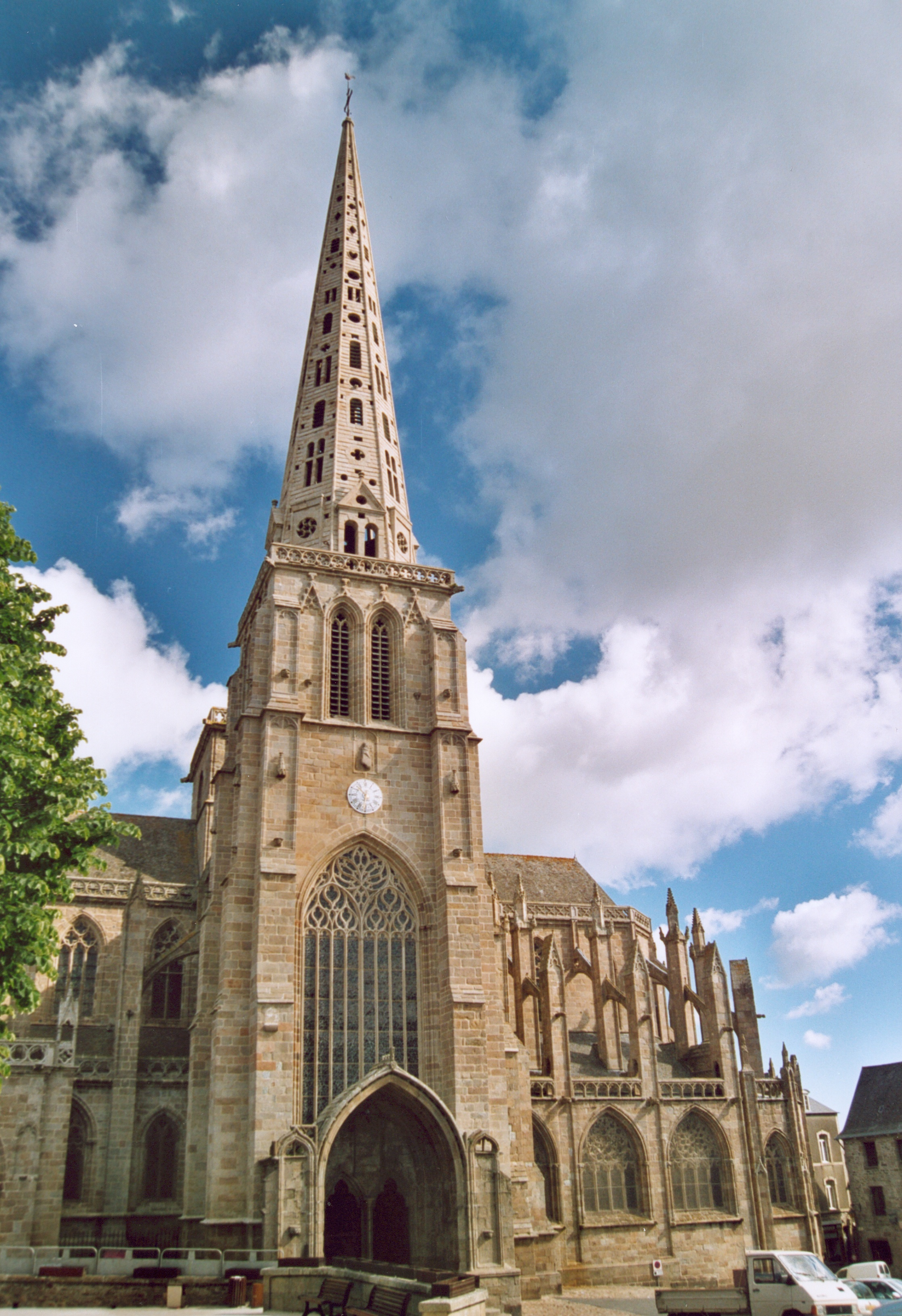
Cathedral St Tugdual

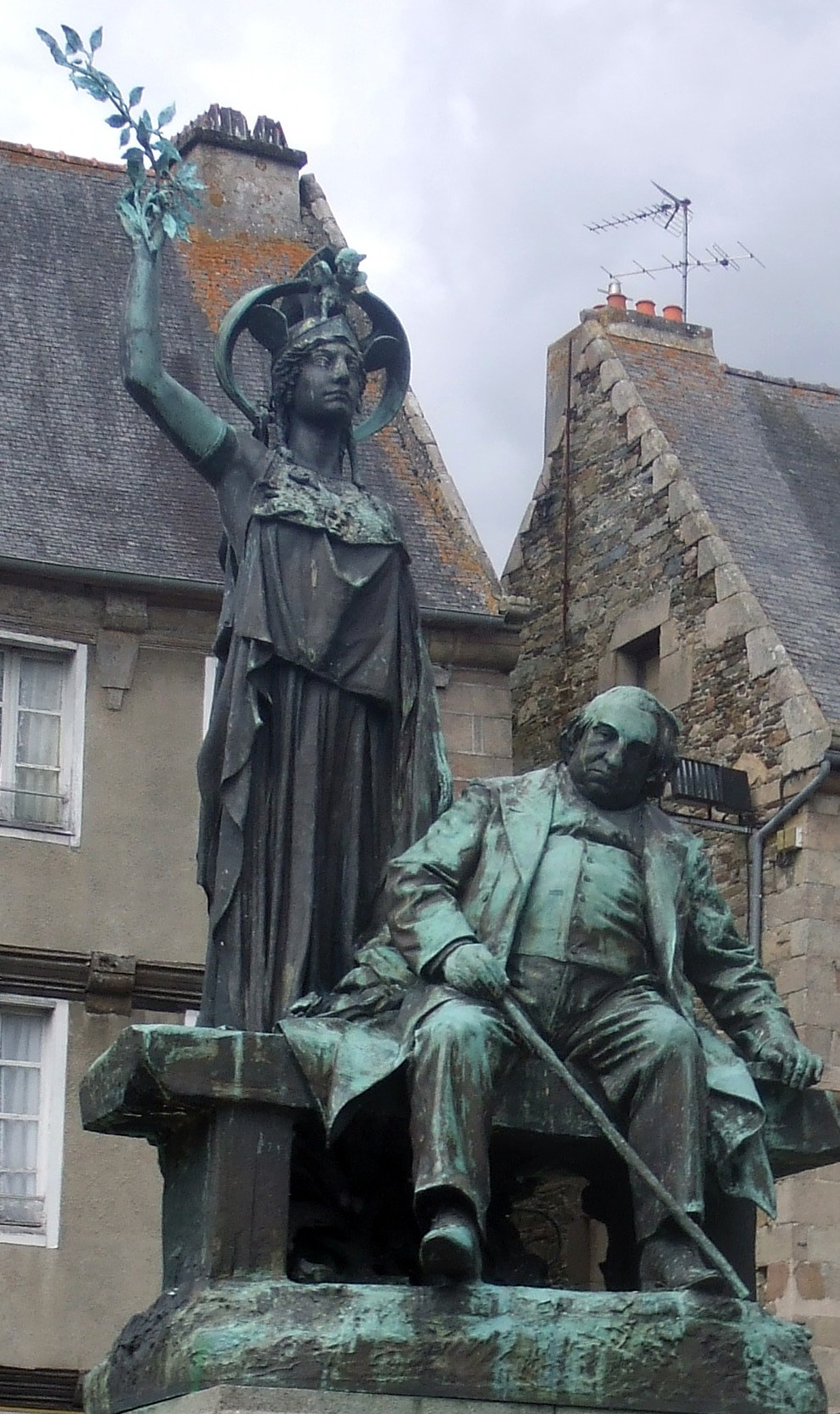
Statue of Ernest Renan in the town square

The cathedral, remarkable in having three towers over the transept, one of which is surmounted by a fine spire, dates from the 14th and 15th centuries. It contains the sumptuous modern mausoleum of Ivo of Kermartin (St Yves; died 1303), a canon of the cathedral and patron saint of lawyers. The building of the cathedral was largely due to him. The Pardon of Saint Ivo, a religious festival, attracts an international audience drawn from the legal profession. To the south of the church there is a cloister (1468) with graceful arcades.

Near the cathedral there is a statue of Ernest Renan, a native of the town. As he was a prominent skeptic, author of the "pagan" Prayer on the Acropolis, the 1903 unveiling of Renan's statue, which also included a depiction of the goddess Athena, led to widespread protests from the Catholic Church. The town also houses the Renan birthplace museum. A notable war memorial, the Pleureuse de Tréguier, was designed by Francis Renaud. A commemorative memorial to Anatole Le Braz by Armel Beaufils is in the jardin du poète.

The port and harbour are picturesque, containing many waterfront restaurants and crêperies. There are views of the quayside.

== Economy ==
In the past, saw-milling, boat-building and flaxstripping were carried on, together with trade in cereals, cloth, potatoes, etc. The port carried on fishing and a coasting and small foreign trade.

== Religious festivals ==
Tro Breizh (Breton for "Tour of Brittany") is a Catholic pilgrimage that links the towns of the seven founding saints of Brittany, including Tréguier, Saint Tudwal's town.

The Pardon of Saint Yves is a major event. As Yves is patron saint of the legal profession, it attracts Catholic lawyers and judges from all over the world.

== Personalities ==
Tréguier was the birthplace of:

- Ernest Renan (1823–1892), philosopher, biblical scholar, and historian of religion.
- Ernest Hello (1828–1885), critic and writer.
- Hervaeus Natalis (c. 1260–1323), 14th Master General of the Dominicans.
- Joseph Savina (1901–1983), designer and sculptor, lived and worked here.

== See also ==
- Ancient Diocese of Tréguier
- Communes of the Côtes-d'Armor department
- The Calvary at Kergrist-Moëlou
