= Tréduder =

Tréduder Treduder
- Commune
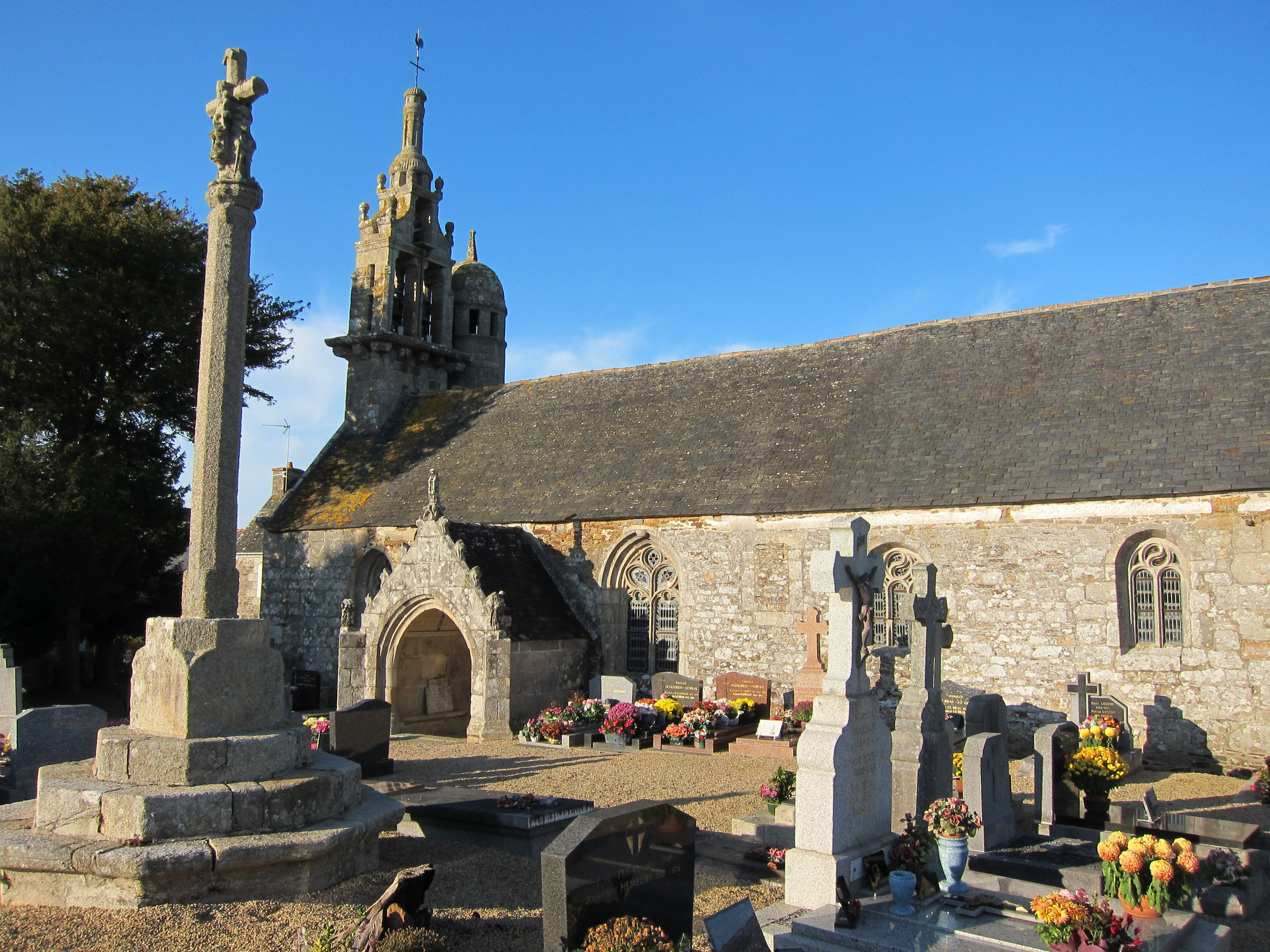
- The church of Saint Théodore
- Location of Tréduder
- Location within France Location within Brittany
- Coordinates: 48°39′04″N 3°33′40″W
- Country: France
- Region: Brittany
- Department: Côtes-d'Armor
- Arrondissement: Lannion
- Canton: Plestin-les-Grèves
- Intercommunality: Lannion-Trégor Communauté

Government
  - Mayor (2021–2026): Patricia Le Guéziec
- Area^{1}: 4.80 km^{2} (1.85 sq mi)
- Highest elevation: 108 m (354 ft)
- Lowest elevation: 0 m (0 ft)
- Population (2023): 210
  - Density: 44/km^{2} (110/sq mi)
- Time zone: UTC+01:00 (CET)
  - Summer (DST): UTC+02:00 (CEST)
- INSEE/Postal code: 22350 /22310
- ^{1} French Land Register data, which excludes lakes, ponds, glaciers > 1 km^{2} (0.386 sq mi or 247 acres) and river estuaries.

Tréduder (French pronunciation: [tʁedydɛʁ]; Breton: Treduder) is a commune in the Côtes-d'Armor department of Brittany in northwestern France.

== Population ==
Historical population
Year	Pop.	±% p.a.
1968	212	—
1975	155	−4.38%
1982	156	+0.09%
1990	157	+0.08%
1999	163	+0.42%
2007	191	+2.00%
2012	199	+0.82%
2017	195	−0.41%
2023	210	+1.24%
Source: INSEE

Inhabitants of Tréduder are called Trédudérois in French.

== See also ==
- Communes of the Côtes-d'Armor department
