= Plouguiel =

Plouguiel Priel
- Commune
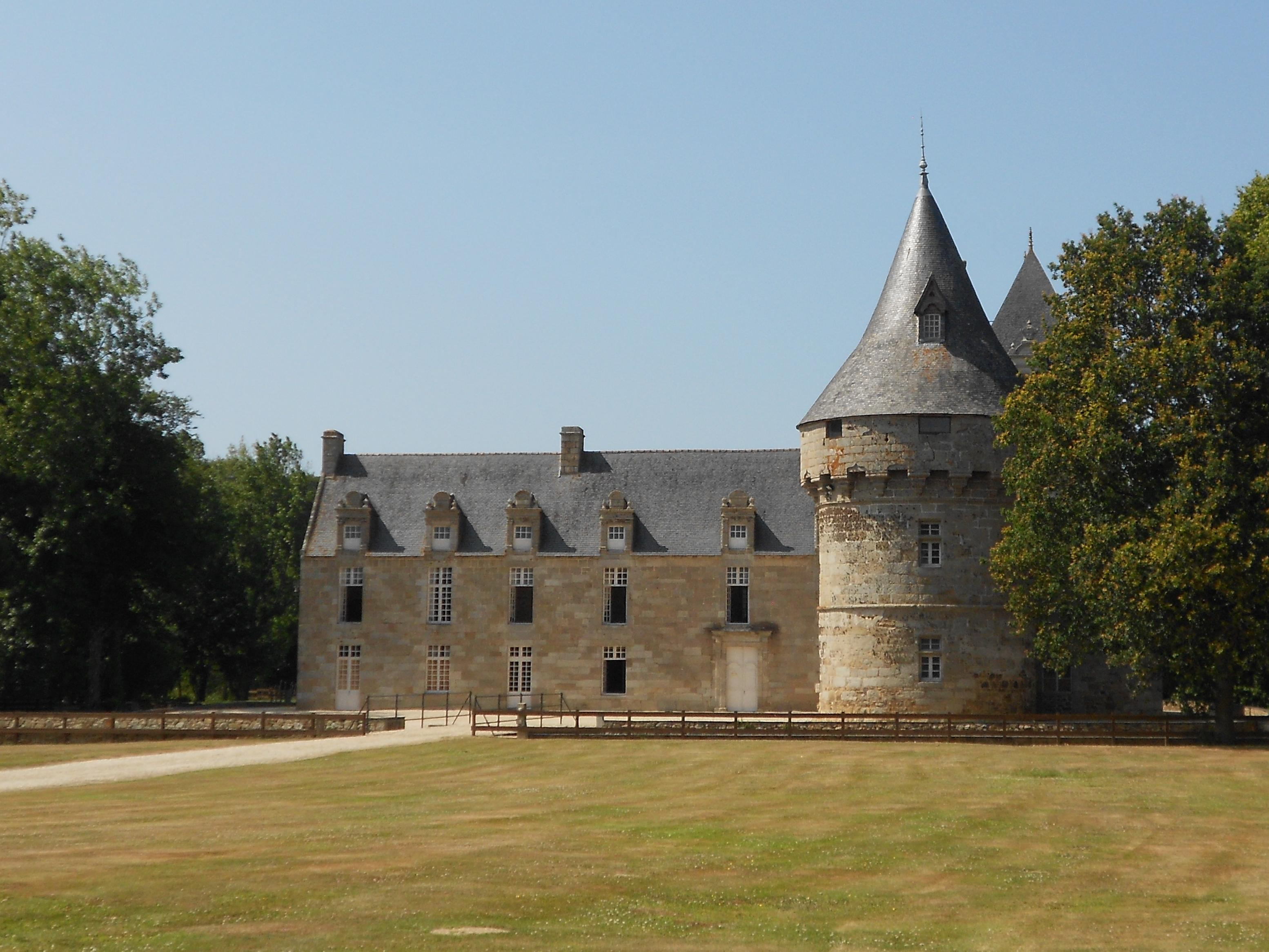
- The château of Kéralio
- Location of Plouguiel
- Location within France Location within Brittany
- Coordinates: 48°47′53″N 3°14′22″W
- Country: France
- Region: Brittany
- Department: Côtes-d'Armor
- Arrondissement: Lannion
- Canton: Tréguier
- Intercommunality: Lannion-Trégor Communauté

Government
  - Mayor (2020–2026): Pierre Huonnic
- Area^{1}: 19.07 km^{2} (7.36 sq mi)
- Highest elevation: 76 m (249 ft)
- Lowest elevation: 0 m (0 ft)
- Population (2023): 1,747
  - Density: 91.61/km^{2} (237.3/sq mi)
- Time zone: UTC+01:00 (CET)
  - Summer (DST): UTC+02:00 (CEST)
- INSEE/Postal code: 22221 /22220
- ^{1} French Land Register data, which excludes lakes, ponds, glaciers > 1 km^{2} (0.386 sq mi or 247 acres) and river estuaries.

Plouguiel (French pronunciation: [pluɡjɛl]; Breton: Priel) is a commune in the Côtes-d'Armor department of Brittany in northwestern France.

== Population ==
Historical population
Year	Pop.	±% p.a.
1968	2,017	—
1975	2,058	+0.29%
1982	2,022	−0.25%
1990	2,056	+0.21%
1999	1,858	−1.12%
2007	1,952	+0.62%
2012	1,802	−1.59%
2017	1,760	−0.47%
2023	1,747	−0.12%
Source: INSEE

Inhabitants of Plouguiel are called plouguielois in French.

== See also ==
- Communes of the Côtes-d'Armor department
