= Lanmérin =

Lanmérin Lanvilin
- Commune
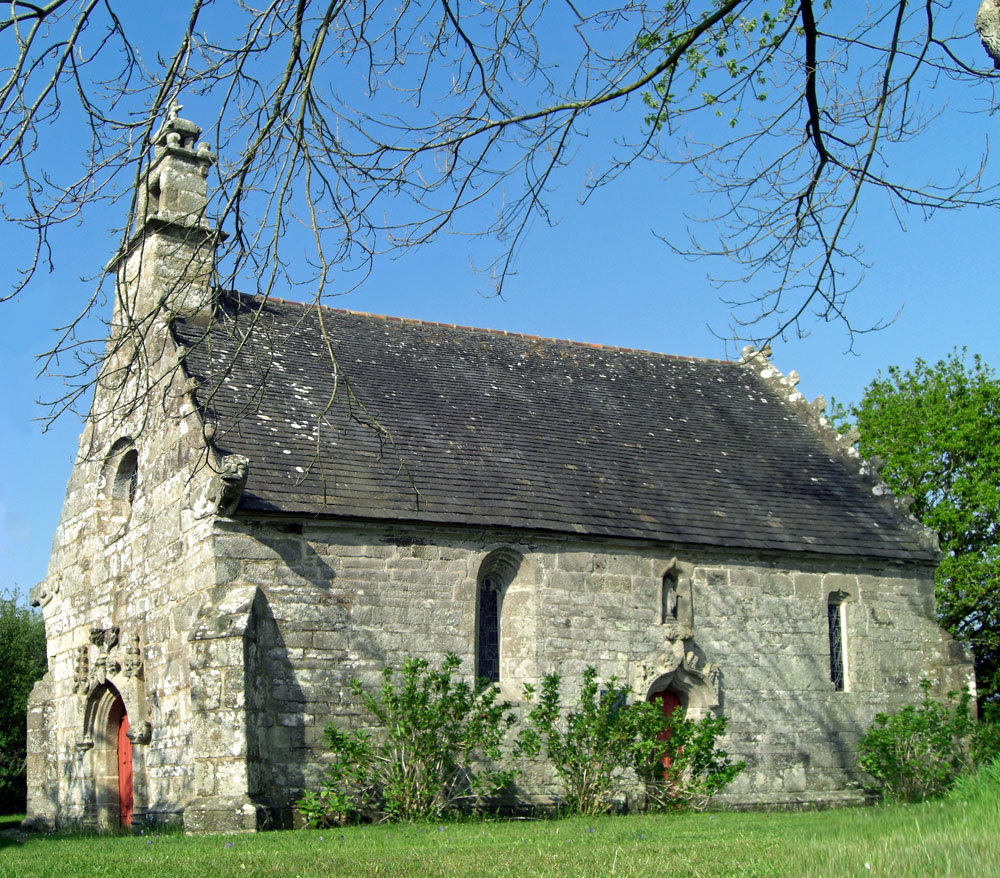
- The de la Salle chapel
- Location of Lanmérin
- Location within France Location within Brittany
- Coordinates: 48°44′32″N 3°20′54″W
- Country: France
- Region: Brittany
- Department: Côtes-d'Armor
- Arrondissement: Lannion
- Canton: Tréguier
- Intercommunality: Lannion-Trégor Communauté

Government
  - Mayor (2025–2026): Carole Bonniec
- Area^{1}: 4.15 km^{2} (1.60 sq mi)
- Highest elevation: 75 m (246 ft)
- Lowest elevation: 27 m (89 ft)
- Population (2023): 575
  - Density: 139/km^{2} (359/sq mi)
- Time zone: UTC+01:00 (CET)
  - Summer (DST): UTC+02:00 (CEST)
- INSEE/Postal code: 22110 /22300
- ^{1} French Land Register data, which excludes lakes, ponds, glaciers > 1 km^{2} (0.386 sq mi or 247 acres) and river estuaries.

Lanmérin (French pronunciation: [lɑ̃meʁɛ̃]; Breton: Lanvilin) is a commune in the Côtes-d'Armor department of Brittany in northwestern France.

== Population ==
Historical population
Year	Pop.	±% p.a.
1968	261	—
1975	245	−0.90%
1982	286	+2.24%
1990	328	+1.73%
1999	331	+0.10%
2007	450	+3.91%
2012	537	+3.60%
2017	599	+2.21%
2023	575	−0.68%
Source: INSEE

Inhabitants of Lanmérin are called lanmérinois in French.

== See also ==
- Communes of the Côtes-d'Armor department
