= Quemperven =

Quemperven Kemperven
- Commune
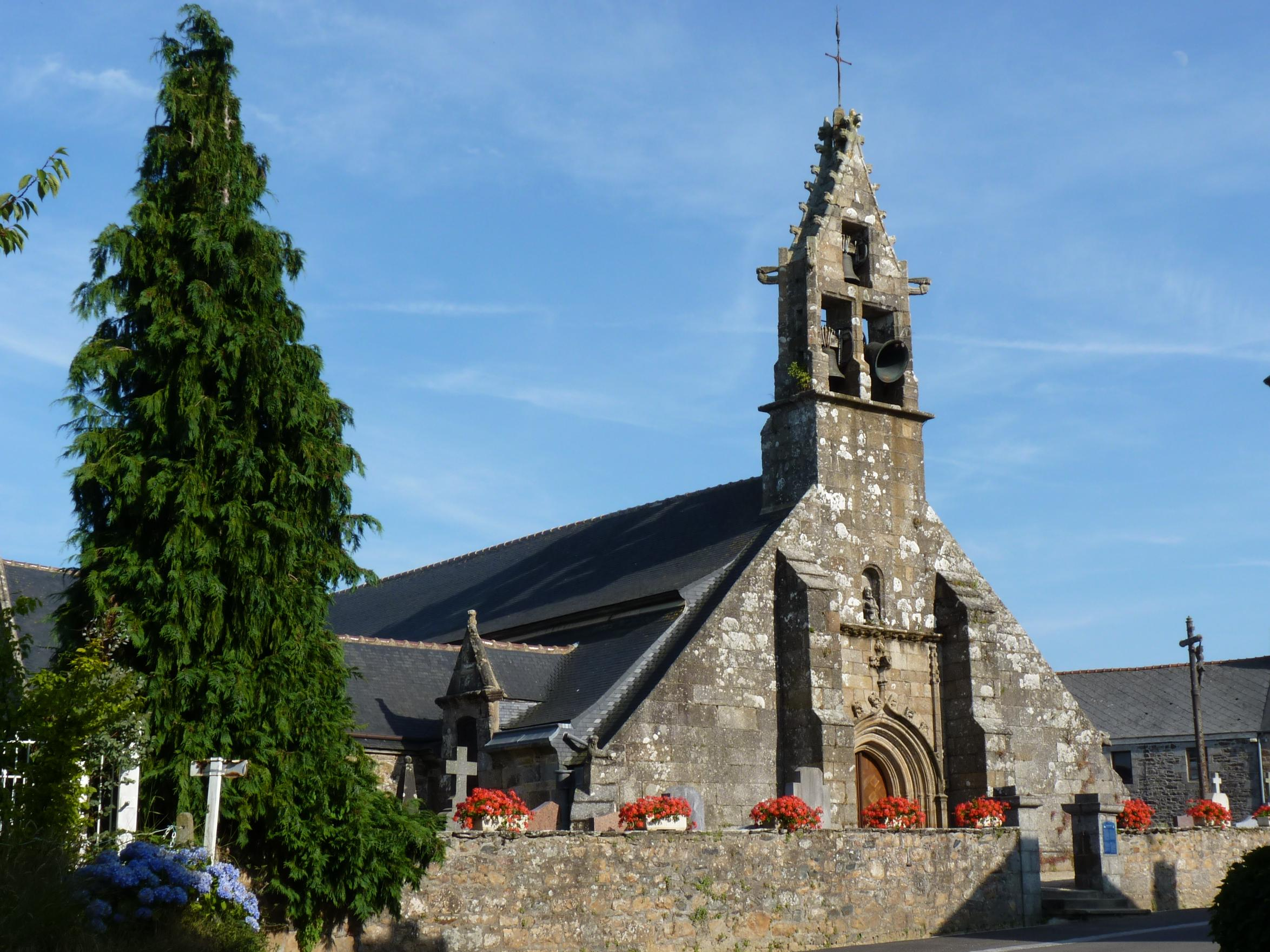
- The church of Saint-Hervé
- Location of Quemperven
- Location within France Location within Brittany
- Coordinates: 48°43′33″N 3°19′15″W
- Country: France
- Region: Brittany
- Department: Côtes-d'Armor
- Arrondissement: Lannion
- Canton: Bégard
- Intercommunality: Lannion-Trégor Communauté

Government
  - Mayor (2020–2026): Laurent Rannou
- Area^{1}: 7.69 km^{2} (2.97 sq mi)
- Highest elevation: 93 m (305 ft)
- Lowest elevation: 28 m (92 ft)
- Population (2023): 417
  - Density: 54.2/km^{2} (140/sq mi)
- Time zone: UTC+01:00 (CET)
  - Summer (DST): UTC+02:00 (CEST)
- INSEE/Postal code: 22257 /22450
- ^{1} French Land Register data, which excludes lakes, ponds, glaciers > 1 km^{2} (0.386 sq mi or 247 acres) and river estuaries.

Quemperven (French pronunciation: [kɛ̃pɛʁvɛ̃]; Breton: Kemperven) is a commune in the Côtes-d'Armor department of Brittany in northwestern France.

== Population ==
Inhabitants of Quemperven are called quempervennois in French. As of 1 January 2024, the population of Quemperven is 404 people. This figure is based on the 2021 census.

== Breton language ==
The municipality launched a linguistic plan through Ya d'ar brezhoneg on 7 July 2006.

== See also ==
- Communes of the Côtes-d'Armor department
