= Coatascorn =

Coatascorn Koadaskorn
- Commune
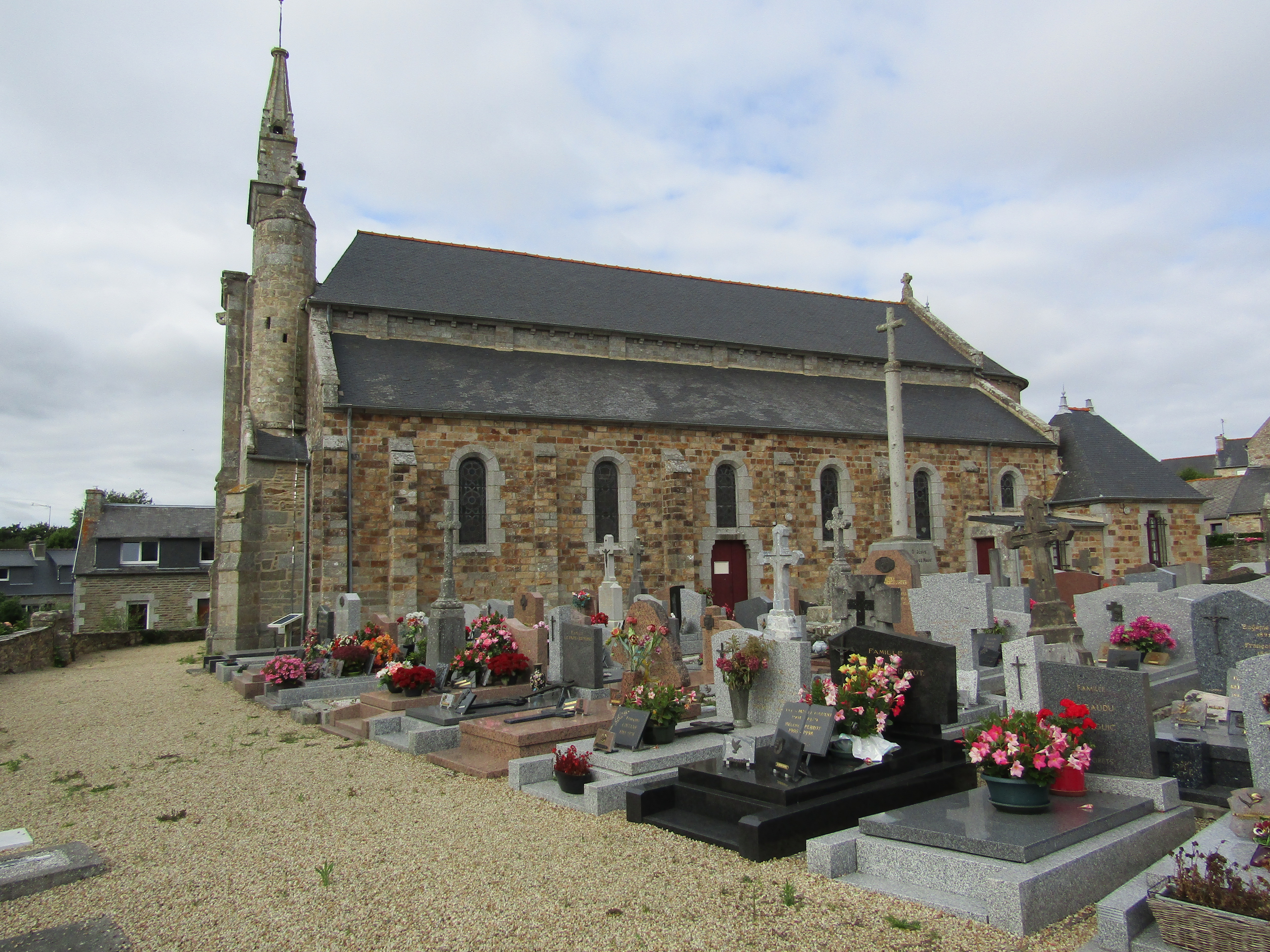
- The church of Saint-Maudez
- Location of Coatascorn
- Location within France Location within Brittany
- Coordinates: 48°40′29″N 3°14′57″W
- Country: France
- Region: Brittany
- Department: Côtes-d'Armor
- Arrondissement: Lannion
- Canton: Bégard
- Intercommunality: Lannion-Trégor Communauté

Government
  - Mayor (2020–2026): Éric Le Creurer
- Area^{1}: 8.05 km^{2} (3.11 sq mi)
- Highest elevation: 101 m (331 ft)
- Lowest elevation: 28 m (92 ft)
- Population (2023): 248
  - Density: 30.8/km^{2} (79.8/sq mi)
- Time zone: UTC+01:00 (CET)
  - Summer (DST): UTC+02:00 (CEST)
- INSEE/Postal code: 22041 /22140
- ^{1} French Land Register data, which excludes lakes, ponds, glaciers > 1 km^{2} (0.386 sq mi or 247 acres) and river estuaries.

Coatascorn (French pronunciation: [kwataskɔʁn]; Breton: Koadaskorn) is a commune in the Côtes-d'Armor department of Brittany in northwestern France!

== Toponymy ==
The name Coatascorn is typically Breton, "koad" meaning "wood" and "ascorn" meaning "bone".

== Population ==
Historical population
Year	Pop.	±% p.a.
1968	281	—
1975	244	−2.00%
1982	211	−2.05%
1990	209	−0.12%
1999	226	+0.87%
2007	252	+1.37%
2012	249	−0.24%
2017	262	+1.02%
2023	248	−0.91%
Source: INSEE

Inhabitants of Coatascorn are called Coatascornais in French.

== Breton language ==
The municipality launched a linguistic plan through Ya d'ar brezhoneg on 7 July 2006.

== See also ==
- Communes of the Côtes-d'Armor department
