= Coatréven =

Coatréven Koatreven
- Commune
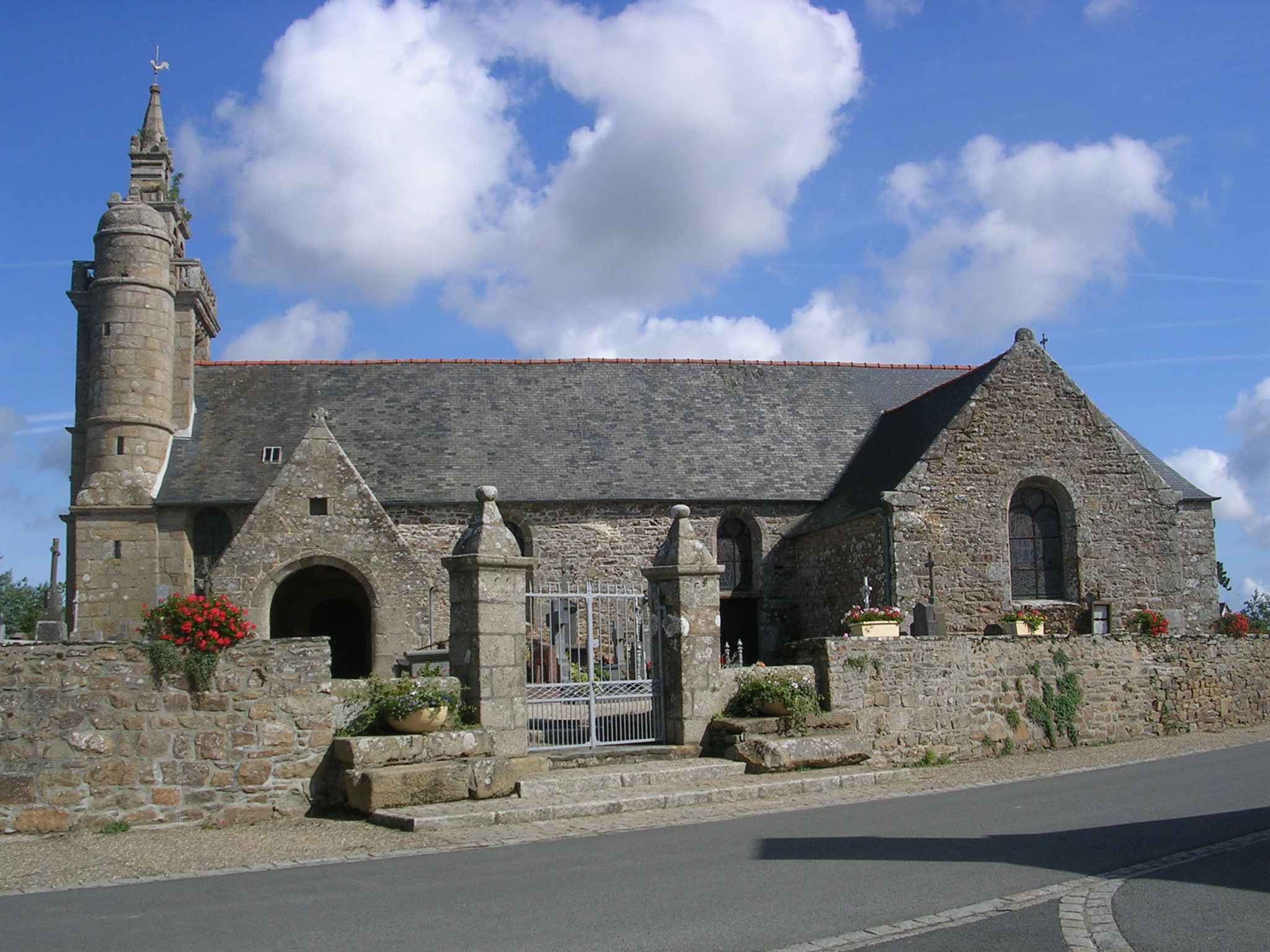
- The church of Coatréven

- Coat of arms
- Location of Coatréven
- Location within France Location within Brittany
- Coordinates: 48°46′09″N 3°20′29″W
- Country: France
- Region: Brittany
- Department: Côtes-d'Armor
- Arrondissement: Lannion
- Canton: Tréguier
- Intercommunality: Lannion-Trégor Communauté

Government
  - Mayor (2020–2026): Yves Le Rolland
- Area^{1}: 9.13 km^{2} (3.53 sq mi)
- Highest elevation: 101 m (331 ft)
- Lowest elevation: 17 m (56 ft)
- Population (2023): 489
  - Density: 53.6/km^{2} (139/sq mi)
- Time zone: UTC+01:00 (CET)
  - Summer (DST): UTC+02:00 (CEST)
- INSEE/Postal code: 22042 /22450
- ^{1} French Land Register data, which excludes lakes, ponds, glaciers > 1 km^{2} (0.386 sq mi or 247 acres) and river estuaries.

Coatréven (French pronunciation: [kwatʁevɛ̃]; Breton: Koatreven) is a commune in the Côtes-d'Armor department of Brittany in northwestern France.

== Toponymy ==
The name Coatréven is typically Breton, "koad" meaning "wood" and "Raven" from the name of an Armorican saint of the 4th century or "tréven" could come from the Old Breton "treb" meaning "village".

== Population ==
Historical population
Year	Pop.	±% p.a.
1968	458	—
1975	378	−2.71%
1982	364	−0.54%
1990	415	+1.65%
1999	382	−0.92%
2007	417	+1.10%
2012	466	+2.25%
2017	495	+1.21%
2023	489	−0.20%
Source: INSEE

Inhabitants of Coatréven are called Coatrévenais in French.

== See also ==
- Communes of the Côtes-d'Armor department
