= Canton of Lannion =

Coordinates: 48.73°N 3.46°W

The canton of Lannion is an administrative division of the Côtes-d'Armor department, northwestern France. Its borders were modified at the French canton reorganisation which came into effect in March 2015. Its seat is in Lannion.

It consists of the following communes:

1. Lannion
2. Ploulec'h
3. Rospez
