= Canton of Tréguier =

Coordinates: 48.79°N 3.23°W

The canton of Tréguier is an administrative division of the Côtes-d'Armor department, northwestern France. Its borders were modified at the French canton reorganisation which came into effect in March 2015. Its seat is in Tréguier.

It consists of the following communes:

1. Camlez
2. Coatréven
3. Kerbors
4. Langoat
5. Lanmérin
6. Lanmodez
7. Lézardrieux
8. Minihy-Tréguier
9. Penvénan
10. Pleubian
11. Pleudaniel
12. Pleumeur-Gautier
13. Plougrescant
14. Plouguiel
15. La Roche-Jaudy
16. Trédarzec
17. Tréguier
18. Trézény
19. Troguéry
