= Efflamm =

Monk and missionary

Saint Efflamm
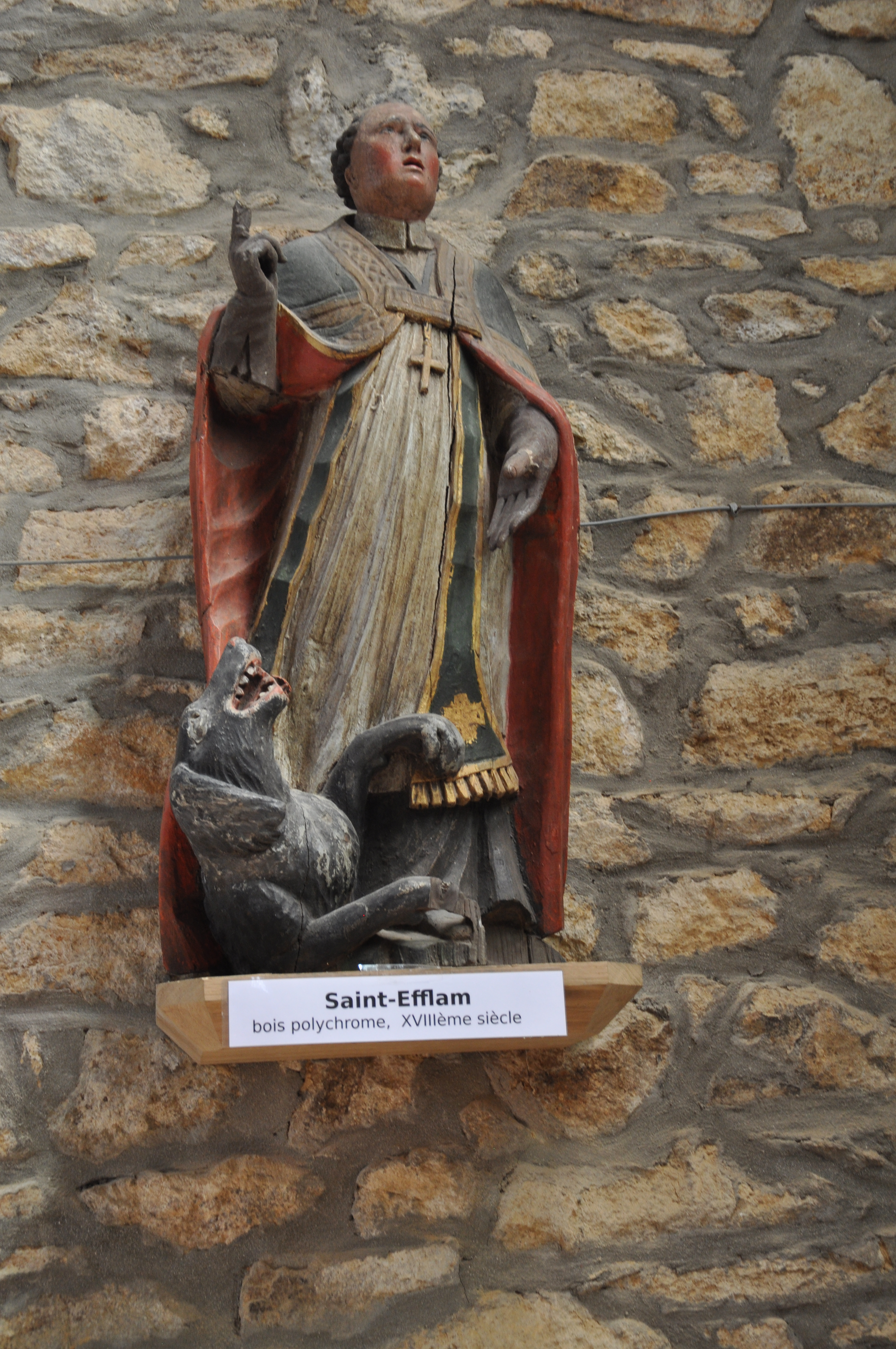
- Saint Efflam, Carnoet
- Born: c. 500; Ireland
- Died: late sixth century Brittany
- Venerated in: Roman Catholic Church; Eastern Orthodox Church; Anglican Communion
- Feast: 6 November

Saint Efflamm is a semi-legendary penitent who was born in Britain and who died in Brittany. His feast is 6 November.

== Legendary biography ==
According to a late tradition forged by the Treguier scriptorium in the 11th century to legitimize the origins of the monastery of Tréguier and the ecclesiastical properties in the surrounding area, Efflam was the son of an Irish king. Born in the late-fifth, early-sixth century, married very young to Enora, daughter of an Irish king, he took a vow of chastity. An angel helped him to resist temptation, and he fled to Brittany, disembarking at Plestin-les-Grèves, in Trégor, where he had lived for a time in the company of Saint Iestyn.

According to another tradition, was obliged by his father to marry the daughter of a king of Britain, in order to establish peace; they never consummated their union. He came from Ireland with his wife Enora and both consecrated themselves to God in a hermitage in the forest.

Efflam died in the late-sixth century, although the exact year in which he died is unknown.

== Legend ==
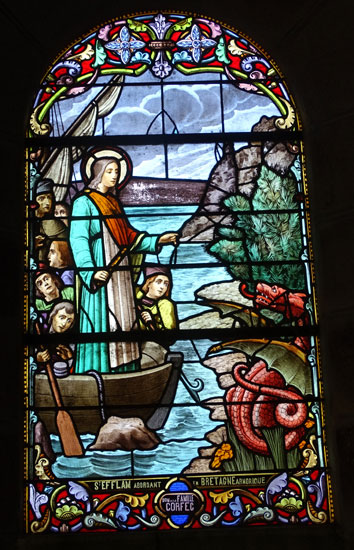
Church of St. Efflamm, Trézény

Albert Le Grand recounted the story of Saint Efflam in his book Les Vies des Saints de la Bretagne Armorique, published in 1636:

The Saint, with his companions, passed over the sea and fortunately came to the coast of Armorica in the parish of Plestin-les-Grèves. Their ship stopped opposite a large rock. At the time there was a very large forest, from which Efflam and his troop, descending from their ship, saw a horrible dragon coming out, which retreated into its cave, about a thousand paces away from the rock.

This dragon used to claim human prey of royal blood every year on Christmas Eve. It was brought to him at nightfall at the foot of the rock. Children who died without baptism were also delivered to him. King Arthur was in pursuit of the dragon; and Efflamm helped Arthur to get rid it. Efflamm drew a spring to quench his thirst at what is now the village of Saint-Efflam (in Plestin-les-Grèves), he then prayed before the monster's lair. The dragon rushed into the sea and was drowned in the bay.

According to another version, the monster was chained up in the open sea, under the stones of the Roc'h Ruz (Red Rock) reef opposite Plestin-les-Grèves, from where the monster vomited his blood.

This legend, which marks the victory of Christianity over paganism, probably stems, according to Louis Le Guillou, from a fear due to the drowning of travelers in this bay, which was likened by its dangers to that of Mont-Saint-Michel. Swept away by the rising tide, which "rises at the speed of a galloping horse", it was the location of the great royal road passing on the beach from Saint-Efflam to Saint-Michel-en-Grève. Fording across the Yar estuary when the tide was already rushing in, with a violent current, because it was constricted by the tip of the spit, caused individual or collective drowning. These accidents did not cease until around 1840, when the Yar broke the spit near its root and went directly to the sea.

== Companions ==
Efflamm was accompanied by several disciples whose names can be found in the toponymy of the surrounding communes: Kirio, Tuder, Kemo, Haran, Nerin, (as well as, according to other versions, Mellec, Kivir, and Eversin...). Nerin and Kemo both gave their name to a town, Plounérin and Locquémeau respectively, whose churches still bear the name of the original saint. Haran has a chapel in Plestin, where there is also a beach named Pors Mellec. An Irish monk, also a traveler with Efflamm, Tuder gave his name to the commune of Tréduder where the church dedicated to him was, in the 17th century, renamed "Saint-Théodore". There is still a fountain in his name.

== Relics ==
On 26 June 1819 the supposed relics of Saint Efflam were discovered in the church of Saint-Efflam in Plestin. Abbot Tresvaux tells of having found them under a flat stone three feet deep, the tomb being opened in the presence of many people including several clergymen such as F. Nayrod, then parish priest of Plestin, and civil personalities such as François Moriou, then mayor of Plestin, and others.

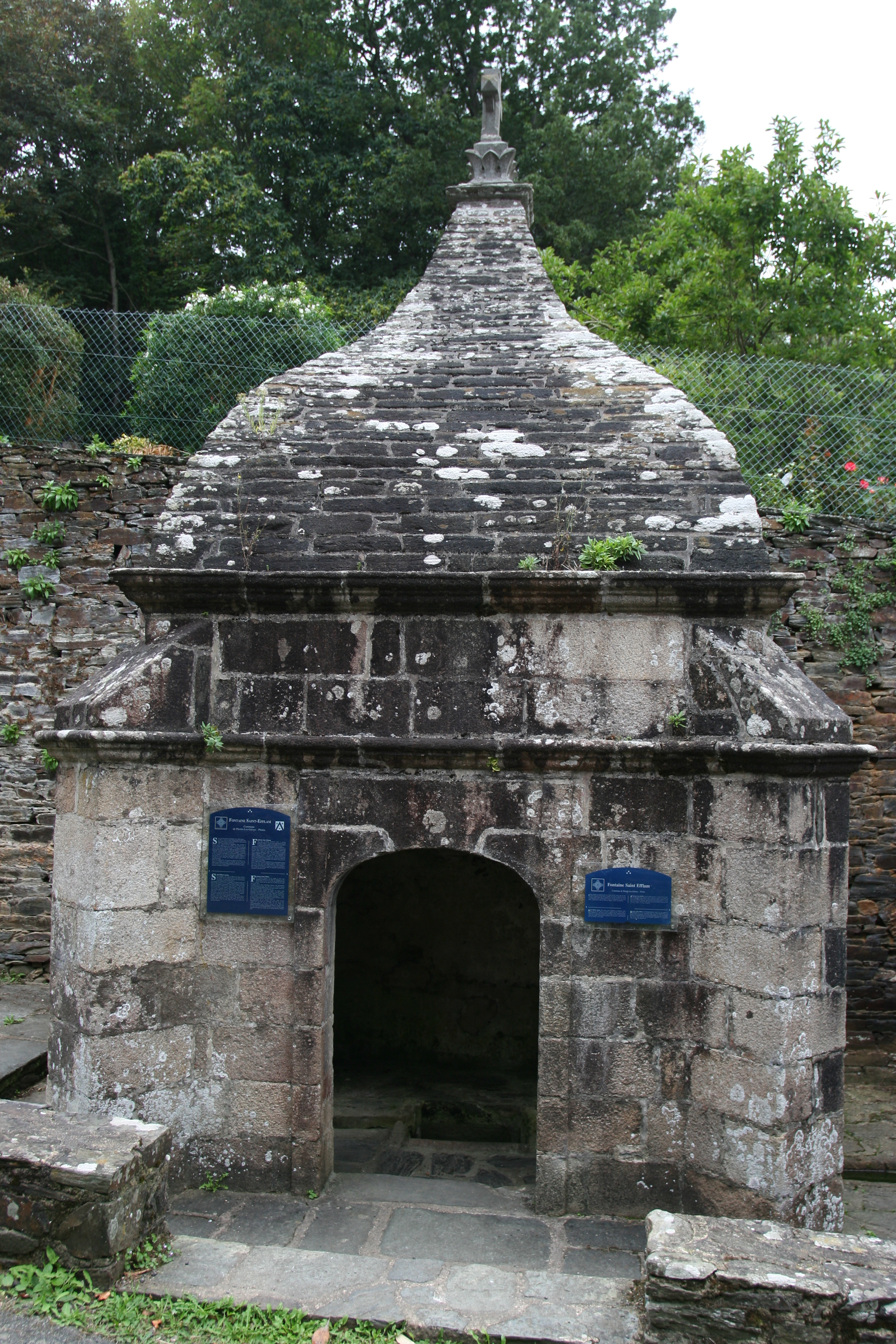
Fontaine Saint-Efflam, Plestin-les-Grèves

== The cult of Saint Efflamm in Brittany ==
In addition to the parish church of Saint-Efflam in Plestin-les-Grèves, Saint Efflam is or was also honoured in the chapel Saint-Efflam also located in Plestin-les-Grèves, as well as in chapels located in Carnoët (now disappeared), Langoëlan (chapel collapsed in 1920), Lescouët, Pédernec, Kervignac, as well as the hospital in Morlaix.

Eefflamm is among about 170 Breton saints represented, each by a statue, at the Vallée des Saints, in Carnoët.

== Bibliography ==
- Albert Le Grand, "Les vies des saints de la Bretagne Armorique : ensemble un ample catalogue chronologique et historique des evesques d'icelle... et le catalogue de la pluspart des abbés, blazons de leurs armes et autres curieuses recherches", 5th édition revue et corrigée par Guy Autret, et complétée par plusieurs autres auteurs, 1901, (https://gallica.bnf.fr/ark:/12148/bpt6k5038760/f627).
