= Trédrez-Locquémeau =

Trédrez-Locquémeau Tredraezh-Lokemo
- Commune
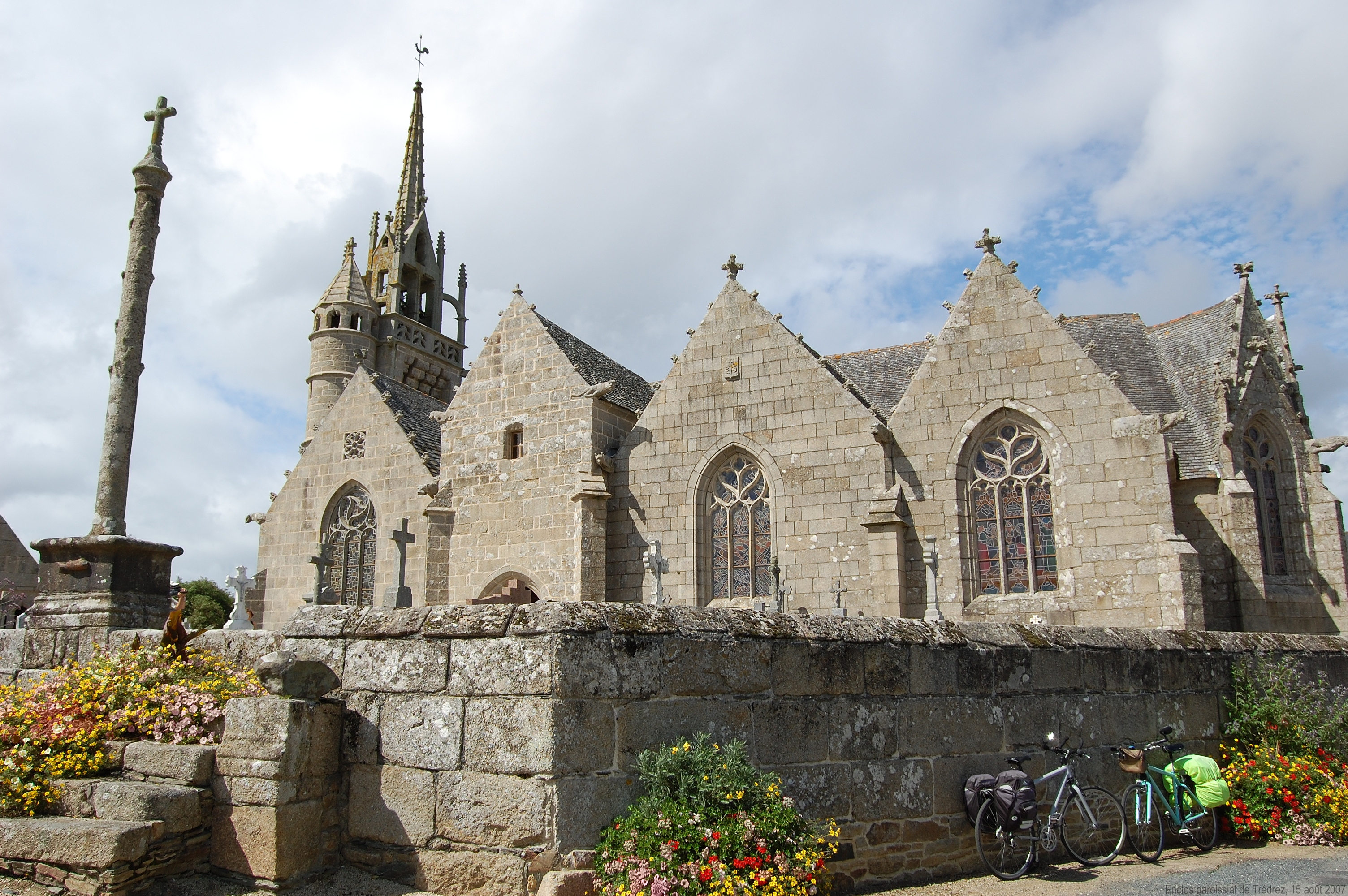
- Parish close
- Location of Trédrez-Locquémeau
- Location within France Location within Brittany
- Coordinates: 48°41′55″N 3°33′52″W
- Country: France
- Region: Brittany
- Department: Côtes-d'Armor
- Arrondissement: Lannion
- Canton: Plestin-les-Grèves
- Intercommunality: Lannion-Trégor Communauté

Government
  - Mayor (2026–32): Frédéric Perreau
- Area^{1}: 10.65 km^{2} (4.11 sq mi)
- Highest elevation: 120 m (390 ft)
- Lowest elevation: 0 m (0 ft)
- Population (2023): 1,478
  - Density: 138.8/km^{2} (359.4/sq mi)
- Time zone: UTC+01:00 (CET)
  - Summer (DST): UTC+02:00 (CEST)
- INSEE/Postal code: 22349 /22300
- ^{1} French Land Register data, which excludes lakes, ponds, glaciers > 1 km^{2} (0.386 sq mi or 247 acres) and river estuaries.

Trédrez-Locquémeau (French pronunciation: [tʁedʁɛz lɔkemo]; Breton: Tredraezh-Lokemo, before 1997: Trédrez) is a commune in the Côtes-d'Armor department of Brittany in northwestern France.

== Population ==
Historical population
Year	Pop.	±% p.a.
1968	916	—
1975	932	+0.25%
1982	1,069	+1.98%
1990	1,155	+0.97%
1999	1,250	+0.88%
2007	1,413	+1.54%
2012	1,441	+0.39%
2017	1,444	+0.04%
2023	1,478	+0.39%
Source: INSEE

Inhabitants of Trédrez-Locquémeau are called trédréziens in French, while those from Locquemeau are described in French as locquémois

== Breton language ==
The municipality launched a linguistic plan through Ya d'ar brezhoneg on 25 July 2006.

== Sights ==
- Church of Saint-Quémeau in Locquémeau, classified as a historical monument since 1922
- Pietà of Trédrez-Locquémeau
- Wayside cross in Trédrez-Locquémeau, listed as a historical monument
- Langoërat Cross, listed as a historical monument on December 7, 1925
- "Virgin and the Tree of Jesse" in the Church of Notre-Dame in Trédrez

== See also ==
- Communes of the Côtes-d'Armor department
