= Ploumilliau =

Ploumilliau Plouilio
- Commune
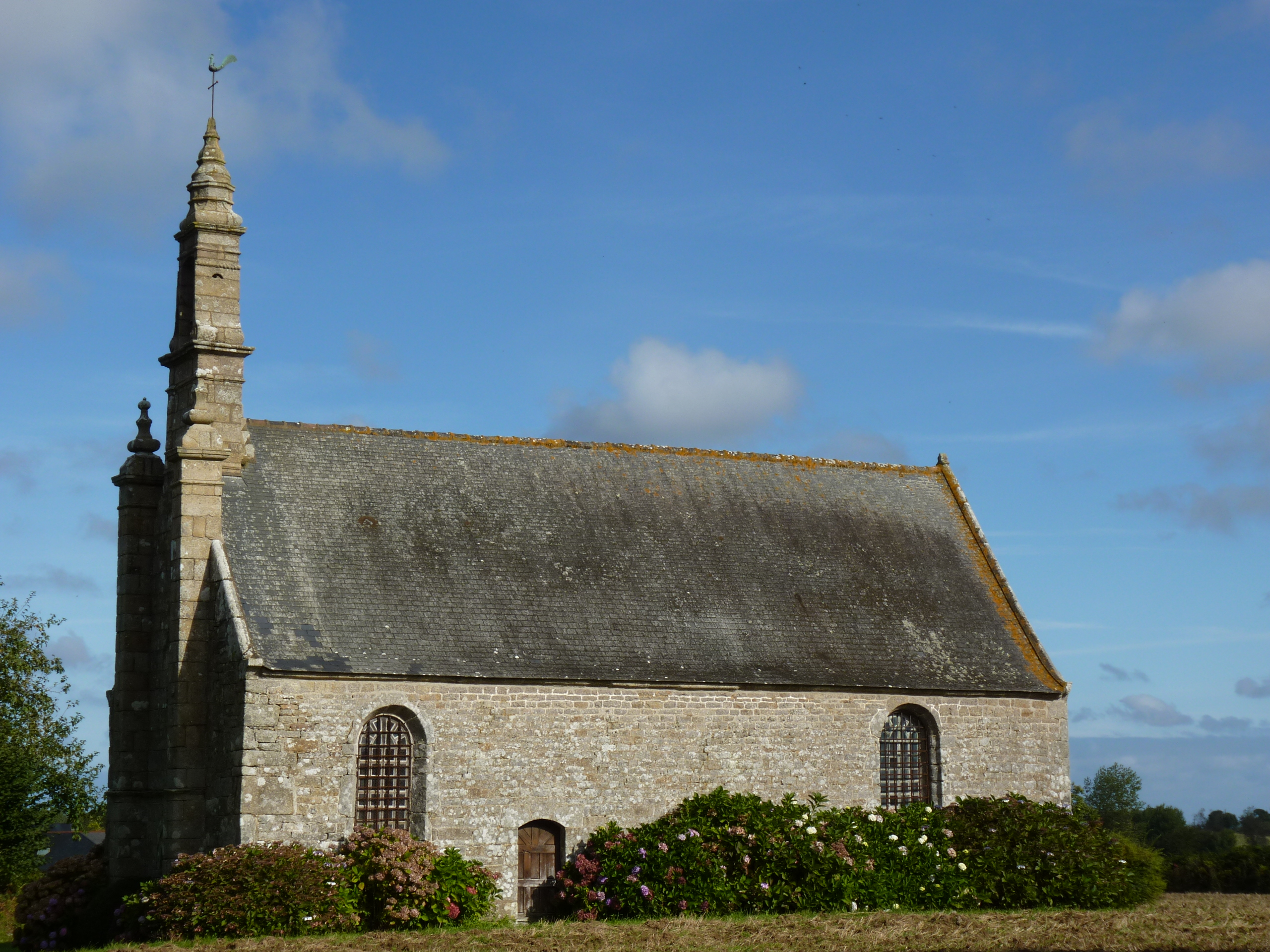
- The chapel of Saint-Cado, in Ploumilliau

- Coat of arms
- Location of Ploumilliau
- Location within France Location within Brittany
- Coordinates: 48°40′51″N 3°31′22″W
- Country: France
- Region: Brittany
- Department: Côtes-d'Armor
- Arrondissement: Lannion
- Canton: Plestin-les-Grèves
- Intercommunality: Lannion-Trégor Communauté

Government
  - Mayor (2020–2026): Yann Kergoat
- Area^{1}: 34.69 km^{2} (13.39 sq mi)
- Highest elevation: 133 m (436 ft)
- Lowest elevation: 0 m (0 ft)
- Population (2023): 2,466
  - Density: 71.09/km^{2} (184.1/sq mi)
- Time zone: UTC+01:00 (CET)
  - Summer (DST): UTC+02:00 (CEST)
- INSEE/Postal code: 22226 /22300
- ^{1} French Land Register data, which excludes lakes, ponds, glaciers > 1 km^{2} (0.386 sq mi or 247 acres) and river estuaries.

Ploumilliau (French pronunciation: [plumijo]; Breton: Plouilio) is a commune in the Côtes-d'Armor department of Brittany in northwestern France.

== Population ==
Inhabitants of Ploumilliau are called milliautais in French.

Historical population
Year	Pop.	±% p.a.
1968	1,735	—
1975	1,865	+1.04%
1982	2,100	+1.71%
1990	2,223	+0.71%
1999	2,173	−0.25%
2007	2,489	+1.71%
2012	2,481	−0.06%
2017	2,481	+0.00%
2023	2,466	−0.10%
Source: INSEE

== Breton language ==
The municipality launched a linguistic plan through Ya d'ar brezhoneg on 12 December 2006.

== See also ==
- Communes of the Côtes-d'Armor department
