= Trégrom =

Trégrom Tregrom
- Commune
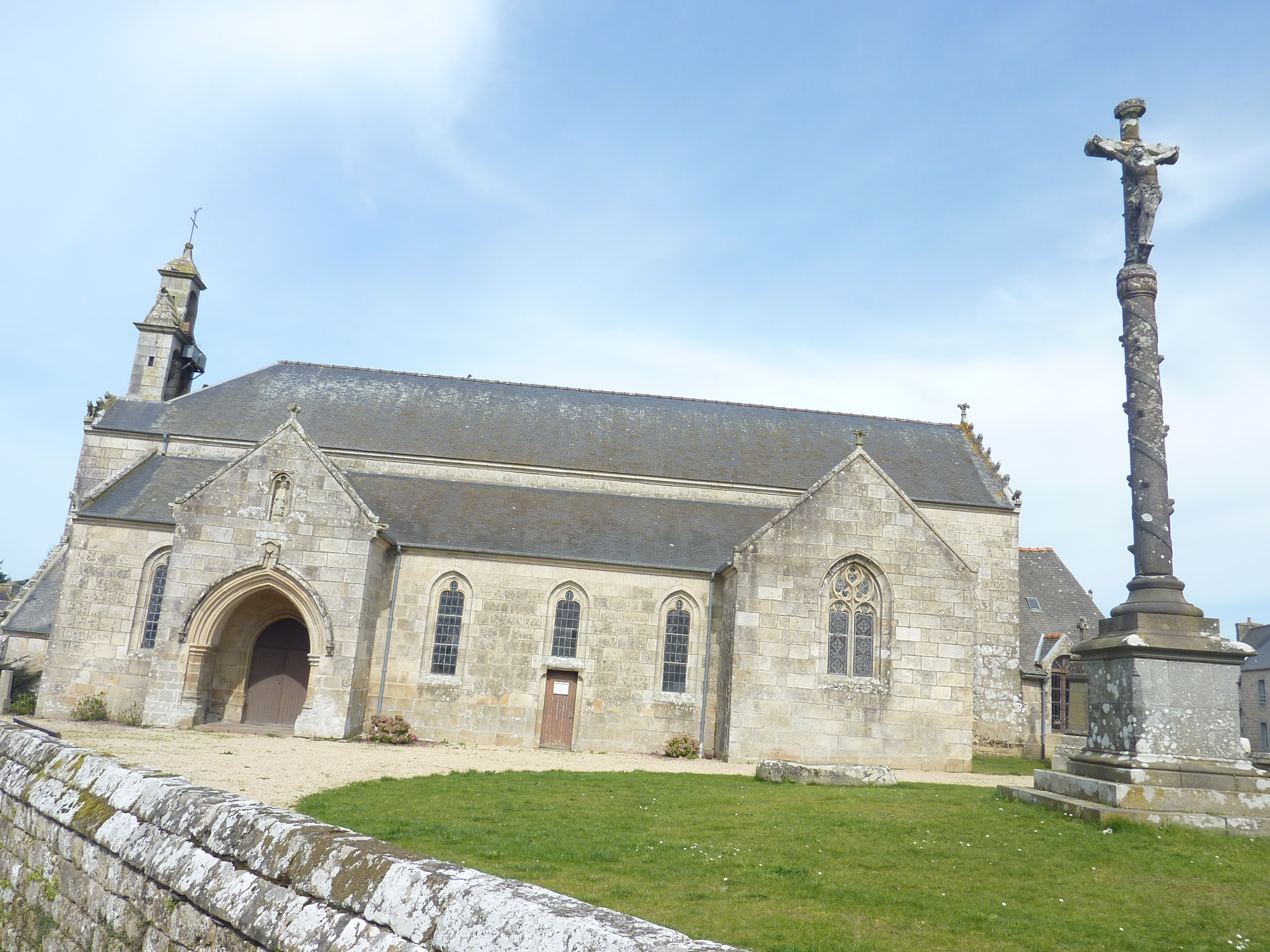
- The church of Saint-Brandan, in Trégrom

- Coat of arms
- Location of Trégrom
- Location within France Location within Brittany
- Coordinates: 48°36′06″N 3°24′14″W
- Country: France
- Region: Brittany
- Department: Côtes-d'Armor
- Arrondissement: Lannion
- Canton: Plestin-les-Grèves
- Intercommunality: Lannion-Trégor Communauté

Government
  - Mayor (2020–2026): Jean-François Le Bras
- Area^{1}: 16.64 km^{2} (6.42 sq mi)
- Highest elevation: 182 m (597 ft)
- Lowest elevation: 43 m (141 ft)
- Population (2023): 464
  - Density: 27.9/km^{2} (72.2/sq mi)
- Time zone: UTC+01:00 (CET)
  - Summer (DST): UTC+02:00 (CEST)
- INSEE/Postal code: 22359 /22420
- ^{1} French Land Register data, which excludes lakes, ponds, glaciers > 1 km^{2} (0.386 sq mi or 247 acres) and river estuaries.

Trégrom (French pronunciation: [tʁeɡʁɔm]; Breton: Tregrom) is a commune in the Côtes-d'Armor department of Brittany in northwestern France.

== Population ==
Historical population
Year	Pop.	±% p.a.
1968	628	—
1975	577	−1.20%
1982	521	−1.45%
1990	483	−0.94%
1999	449	−0.81%
2007	386	−1.87%
2012	402	+0.82%
2017	426	+1.17%
2023	464	+1.43%
Source: INSEE

== Breton language ==
The municipality launched a linguistic plan through Ya d'ar brezhoneg on 16 October 2007.

== See also ==
- Communes of the Côtes-d'Armor department
