= Keret =

Keret may refer to:

- Legend of Keret, a Ugaritic poem about the life of King Keret of Hubur
- Lake Keret in Karelia
- Etgar Keret, Israeli writer
