= Plounévez-Moëdec =

Plounévez-Moëdec Plounevez-Moedeg
- Commune
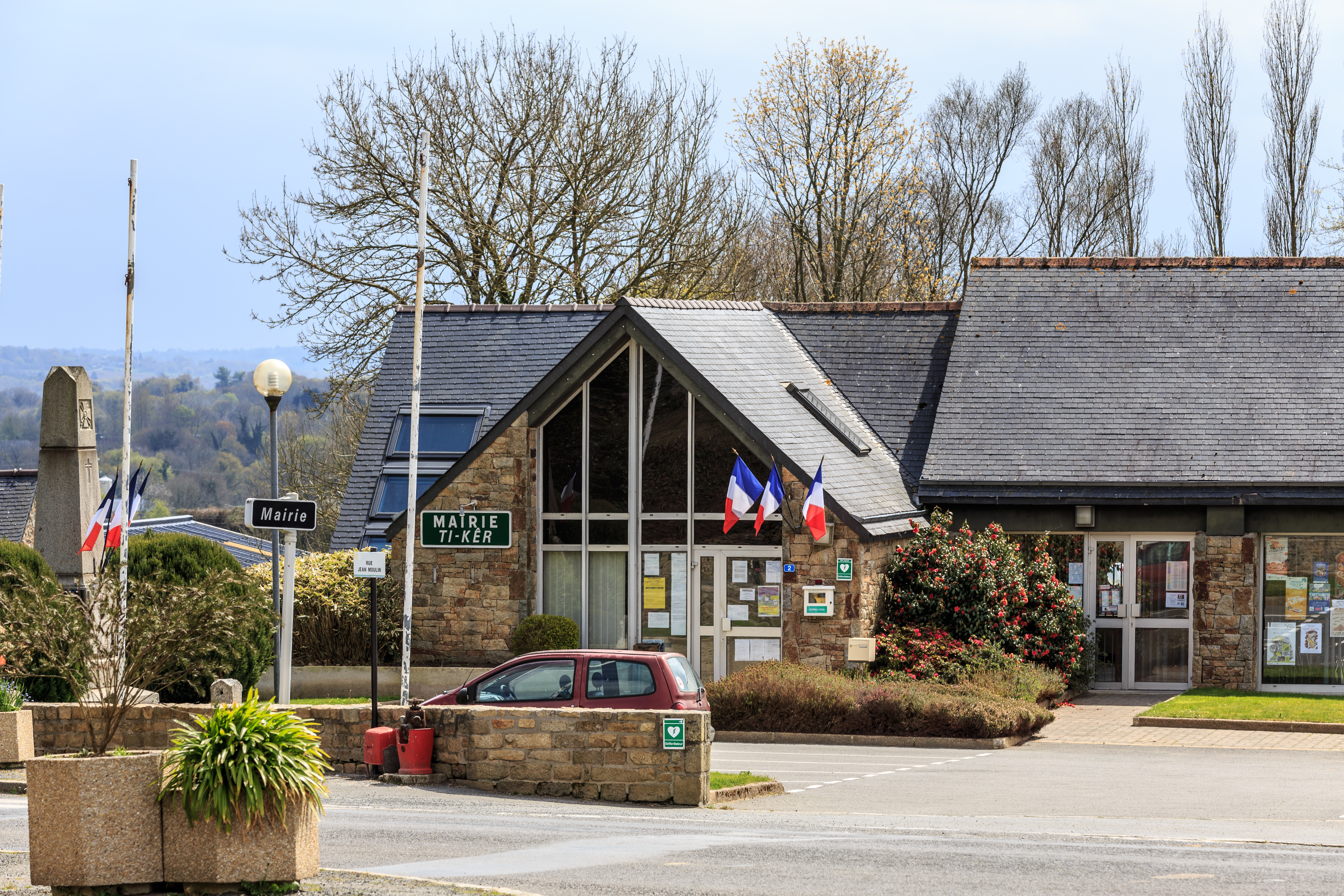
- The town hall of Plounévez-Moëdec
- Location of Plounévez-Moëdec
- Location within France Location within Brittany
- Coordinates: 48°33′26″N 3°26′24″W
- Country: France
- Region: Brittany
- Department: Côtes-d'Armor
- Arrondissement: Lannion
- Canton: Plestin-les-Grèves
- Intercommunality: Lannion-Trégor Communauté

Government
  - Mayor (2020–2026): Gérard Quilin
- Area^{1}: 40.36 km^{2} (15.58 sq mi)
- Highest elevation: 222 m (728 ft)
- Lowest elevation: 58 m (190 ft)
- Population (2023): 1,479
  - Density: 36.65/km^{2} (94.91/sq mi)
- Time zone: UTC+01:00 (CET)
  - Summer (DST): UTC+02:00 (CEST)
- INSEE/Postal code: 22228 /22810
- ^{1} French Land Register data, which excludes lakes, ponds, glaciers > 1 km^{2} (0.386 sq mi or 247 acres) and river estuaries.

Plounévez-Moëdec (French pronunciation: [pluneve mwedɛk]; Breton: Plounevez-Moedeg) is a commune in the Côtes-d'Armor department of Brittany in north-western France.

== Population ==
Inhabitants of Plounévez-Moëdec are called in French plounévéziens.

Historical population
Year	Pop.	±% p.a.
1968	2,066	—
1975	1,890	−1.26%
1982	1,641	−2.00%
1990	1,482	−1.27%
1999	1,347	−1.06%
2007	1,429	+0.74%
2012	1,447	+0.25%
2017	1,458	+0.15%
2023	1,479	+0.24%
Source: INSEE

== Breton Language ==
As of 2023 68.2% of the towns pupils learned in bilingual French Breton schools known as Diwans as part of the Ya d'ar brezhoneg.

== See also ==
- Communes of the Côtes-d'Armor department
