= November 6 (Eastern Orthodox liturgics) =

Day in the Eastern Orthodox liturgical calendar

Eastern Orthodox liturgical calendar
November 5	November 6	November 7
November 6 O.S. ≍ November 19 N.S. November 6 N.S ≍ October 24 O.S.

An Eastern Orthodox cross

November 6 in Eastern Orthodox liturgical calendars is a feast day and a day of commemoration of saints and martyrs. Although some Orthodox churches use the Revised Julian Calendar and others use the traditional Julian calendar, the fixed commemorations for their respective November 6 are broadly the same, no matter which calendar is used. (Note: Despite the dates being the same, the days to which they refer typically differ by 13 days. The notation Old Style or O.S. is sometimes used to indicate a date in the traditional Julian Calendar (the "Old Calendar"). The notation New Style or N.S. indicates a date in the Revised Julian calendar (the "New Calendar").)

== Saints ==
- Virgin-martyr Manatho. (see also: October 20)
- Virgin-martyrs Tecusa, Alexandra, Claudia, Matrona, Polactia, Euphrosyne, Julia, Euphrasia, Faina, and Athanasia, of Ancyra (303) (see also: May 18)
- Martyr Nikander, by the sword. (Note: Probably one of the 33 Martyrs of Melitene commemorated in November 7.)
- Saint Paul the Confessor, Archbishop of Constantinople (c. 350) (see also: June 7 - West)
- Venerable Luke of Tauromenium, monk, of Sicily (820)
- Saint Demetrianus, Bishop of Cytheria on Cyprus, Wonderworker (c. 915) (Note: See: (in Greek) Άγιος Δημητριανός. Βικιπαίδεια. (Greek Wikipedia).)
- Blessed Paul of Corinth, Fool-for-Christ. (Note: We do not know how he died. We know only that he was from Corinth, and became a standard-bearer.)

== Pre-Schism Western saints ==
- Saint Felix of Thynissa, a martyr who suffered in Thynissa near Hippo (Bone) in North Africa. (Note: He was found dead in prison the day before he was to be executed.) (Note: "AT Tunis, in Africa, the birthday of St. Felix, martyr, who, having confessed Christ, was sent to prison, his execution being deferred. But the next day he was found dead, as is related by St. Augustine, in his exposition of a psalm to the people on the feast of the saint.")
- Saint Illtyd (Illtut), abbot, of Llanilltyd Fawr, Wales (505) (Note: One of the most famous saints in Wales. He became a monk with St Cadoc and later founded the monastery of Lian-IlItut or Llantwit, from where came most of the Welsh saints of that period. By tradition he reposed in Brittany.)
- Saint Leonard of Noblac, Gaul (c. 559) (Note: A French courtier converted by St Remi of Rheims in France. On the advice of that saint, St Leonard went to live in the monastery of Micy near Orleans and later he became a hermit in a neighbouring forest, now called Noblac.) (Note: "At Limoges, in Aquitaine, St. Leonard, confessor, disciple of the blessed bishop Remigius, who was born of a noble family, and chose to lead a solitary life. He was celebrated for holiness and miracles, but his miraculous gift shone particularly in the deliverance of captives.")
- Saint Leonianus, a hermit near Autun (c. 570) (Note: Born in Pannonia, he was taken as a prisoner to France and on regaining his freedom lived as a hermit near Autun.)
- Saint Felix, a monk at a monastery in Fondi in the south of Italy (6th century)
- Saint Severus, Bishop of Barcelona in Spain (633) (Note: He was martyred under the Arian Visigoths who put him to death by driving nails into his temples.) (Note: "At Barcelona, St. Severus, bishop and martyr, who had his head pierced with a nail, and thus received the crown of martyrdom for the faith.")
- Saint Edwen, she is the patroness saint of Llanedwen in Anglesey in Wales (7th century)
- Saint Efflamm, born in Britain, he went to Brittany where he became abbot of a monastery he had founded (c. 700)
- Saint Winnoc, Abbot, of Flanders (716) (Note: Born in Wales, he became a monk at Sithin in France. He was sent to found a new monastery at Wormhoult in Belgium where he became abbot and he enlightened the surrounding area from that centre.) (Note: "At Berg, the departure from this life of St. Winoc, abbot, who wasrenowned for virtues and miracles, and for a long time served his brethren, even those who were subject to him.")
- Saint Cowey of Portaferry, Abbot, of Moville Monastery (8th century)
- Saint Erlafrid, founder of Hirsau Abbey in Germany, where he became a monk (c. 830)
- Saint Stephen of Apt, Bishop of Apt in the south of France in 1010 (1046)

== Post-Schism Orthodox saints ==
- Venerable Barlaam of Khutyn, founder of Khutyn Monastery, Novgorod (1192) (see also: June 6)
- Saint Luke, steward of the Kiev Caves (13th century)
- Saint Herman, Archbishop of Kazan (1567)
- Saint Barlaam of Keret, Karelia (16th century) (Note: See also: (in Russian) Варлаам Керетский. Википедии. (Russian Wikipedia).) (see also: January 15)
- Venerable Agapios the Presbyter (Asimakis Leonardos) (1812) (Note: Born in Dimitsana in 1740 as Asimakis Leonardos, later known as Agapios the Presbyter. He was an eminent scholar and ecclesiastical writer. He died in Argos in 1812.)
- Saint Elias Fondaminsky of Paris (1942) (see also: July 20)

=== New martyrs and confessors ===
- New-Martyr Gregory the Cross-bearer (1936)
- New Hieromartyr Nicetas (Delektorsky), Bishop of Orekhovo-Zuevsk (1937) (Note: See: (in Russian) Никита (Делекторский). Википедии. (Russian Wikipedia).)
- New Hieromartyr Barlaam (Nikolsky), Abbot, of Andreyevskoe, Moscow (1937)
- New Hieromartyr Gabriel (Vladimirov), Hieromonk of the St. Michael Skovorodsky Monastery, Novgorod (1937)
- New Hieromartyr Gabriel (Gur), Hieromonk, of Lytkarino, Moscow (1937)
- New Hieromartyrs Anatoly Berzhitsky, Arsenius Troitsky, (Note: See: (in Russian) Троицкий, Арсений Сергеевич. Википедии. (Russian Wikipedia).) Nicholas Dvoretsky, Nicholas Protasov, Constantine Lyubomydrov, Priests (1937)
- New Hieromartyrs of the Kamensk Diocese (1937):

- Vasily Vakhnin, Joseph Chekhranov, and Theodore Romanovsky, priests.

- Virgin-martyrs Nina (Shuvalova), and Seraphima (Gorshkova), nuns (1937)
- New Hieromartyr Basil Krylov, Priest (1938)
- Synaxis of the New Martyrs of Sarov:

- Anatole, Basil, Hierotheus, Isaac, and Rufinus (1938)

== Other commemorations ==
- Commemoration of the falling of ash from the sky in Constantinople, during the reign of the Emperor Leo the Great and Patriarch Gennadius (472) (Note: This event is associated with the unusual weather phenomenon caused by the eruption of Mount Vesuvius. The falling ash was described as black ash and burned strongly, causing fear and prompting the people to seek repentance and prayer. The event lasted for a full forty days, and it is believed to have been a manifestation of God's punishment for sin, similar to the fate of Sodom and Gomorrah. The Commemoration serves as a reminder of the need for spiritual repentance and the consequences of sin.)
- Commemoration of the Sarov Elders:

- Abbot Pachomius (1794); Hieroschemamonk Joseph (1785); Hieromonks Pitirim (1789) and Matthew (1795); and Monk Joachim (1802).

== Icon gallery ==
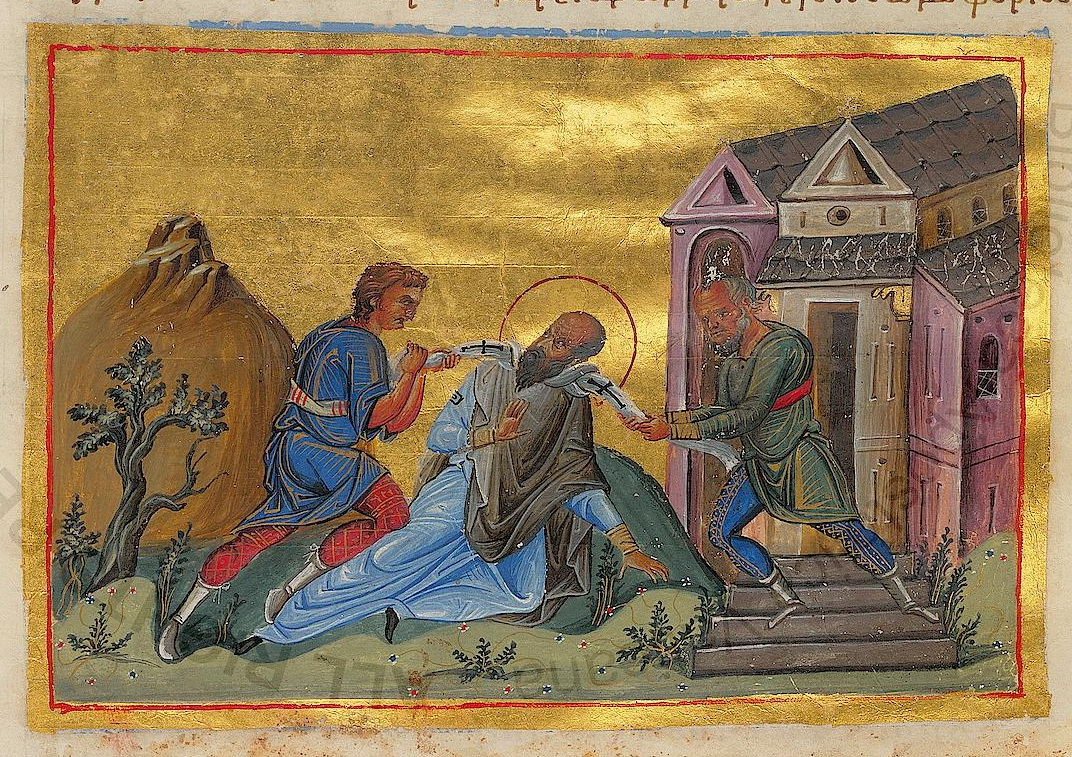
St. Paul the Confessor, Archbishop of Constantinople.
(Menologion of Basil II, 10th century).

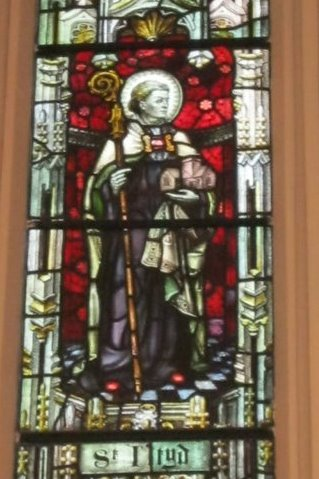
St. Illtyd, abbot, of Llanilltyd Fawr, Wales.

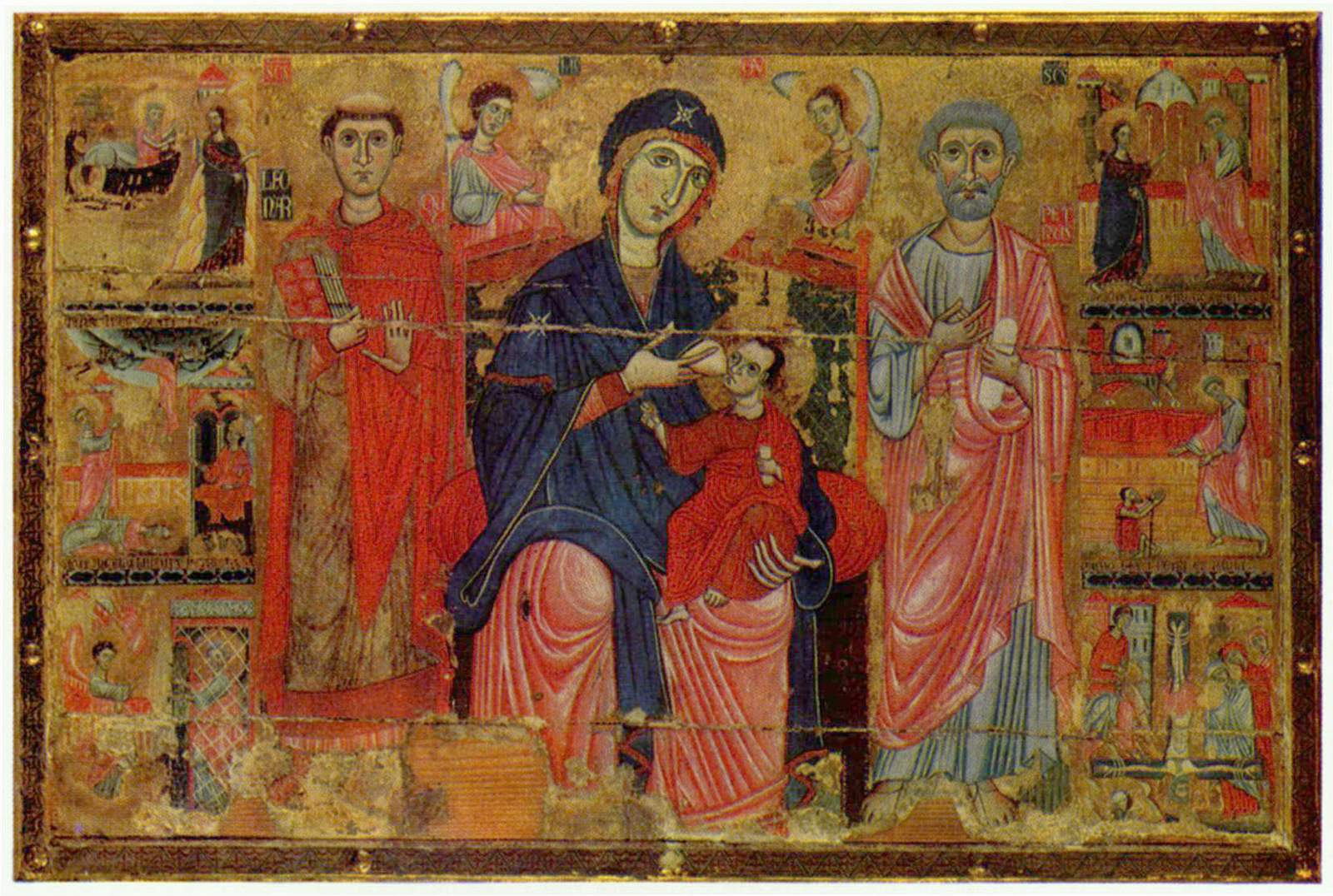
St. Peter and St. Leonard of Noblac.

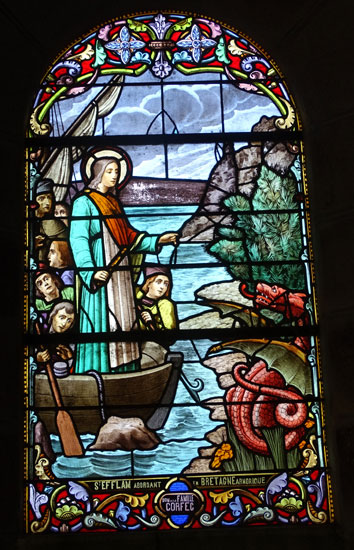
St. Efflamm.

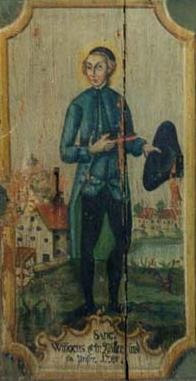
St. Winnoc of Flanders.

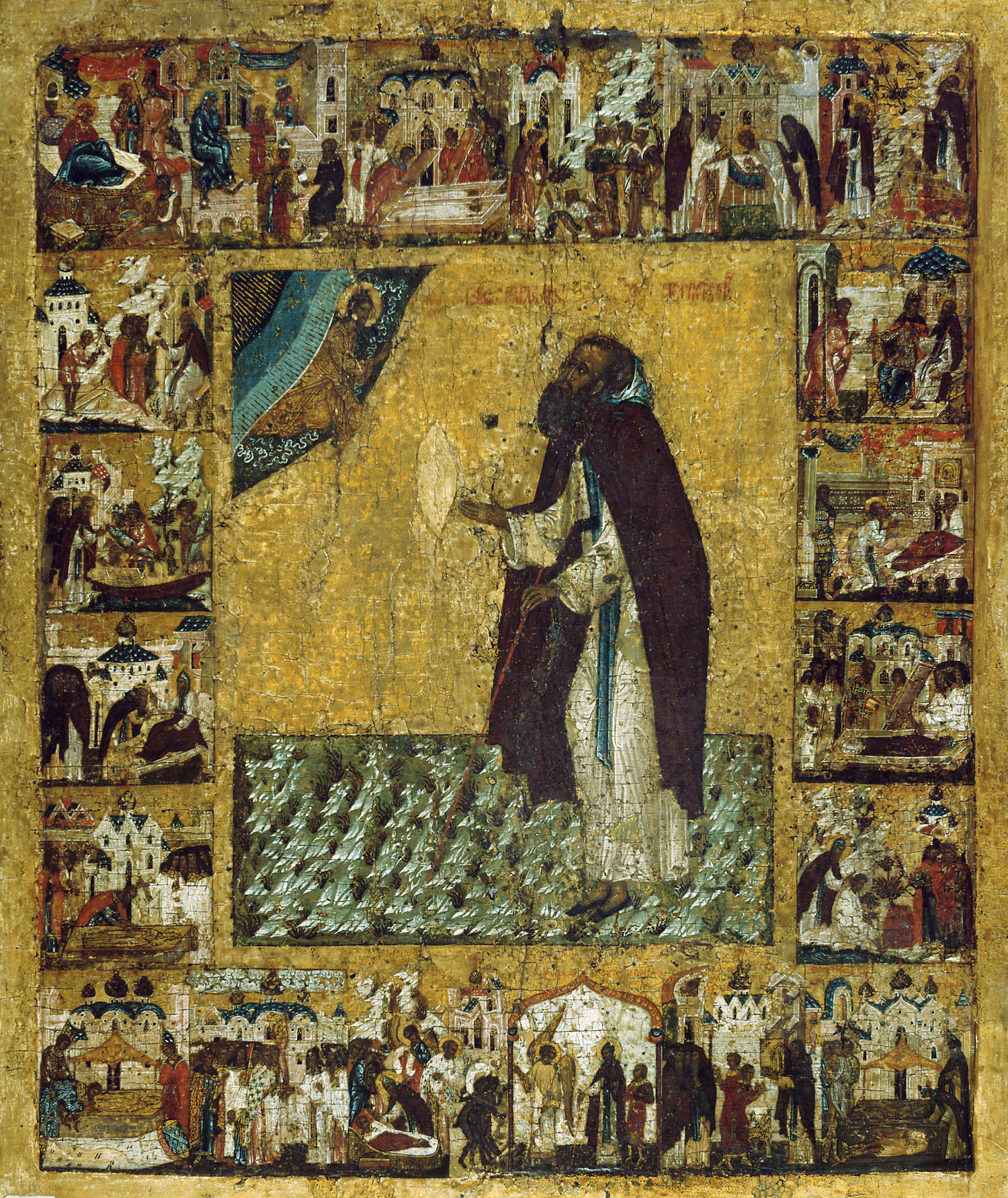
Venerable Barlaam of Khutyn.

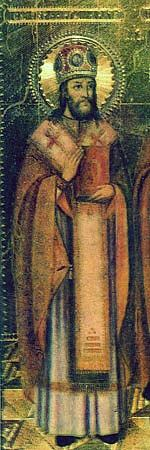
St. Herman, Archbishop of Kazan.

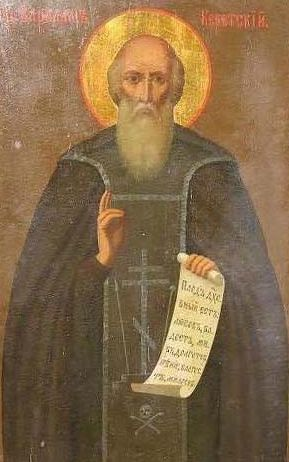
Saint Barlaam of Keret, Karelia.

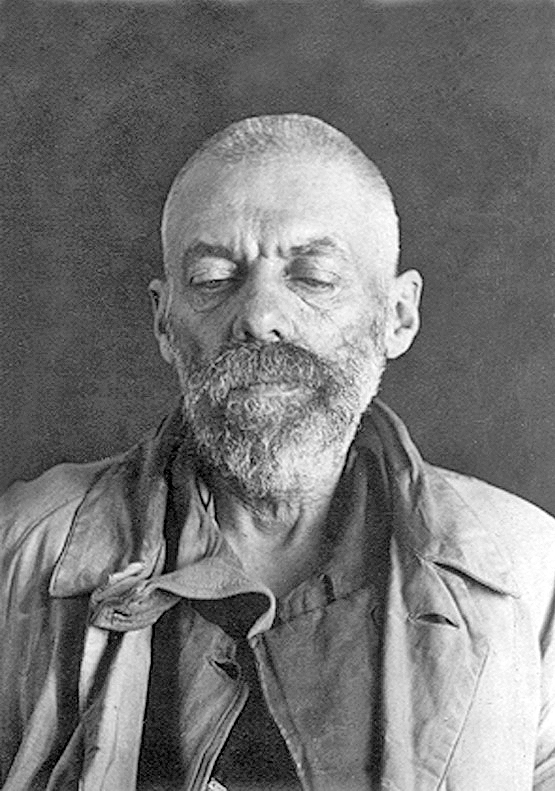
New Hieromartyr Nicetas (Delektorsky), Bishop of Orekhovo-Zuevsk.

New Hieromartyr Barlaam (Nikolsky), Abbot, of Andreyevskoe, Moscow.

New Hieromartyr Constantine Lyubomydrov, Priest.

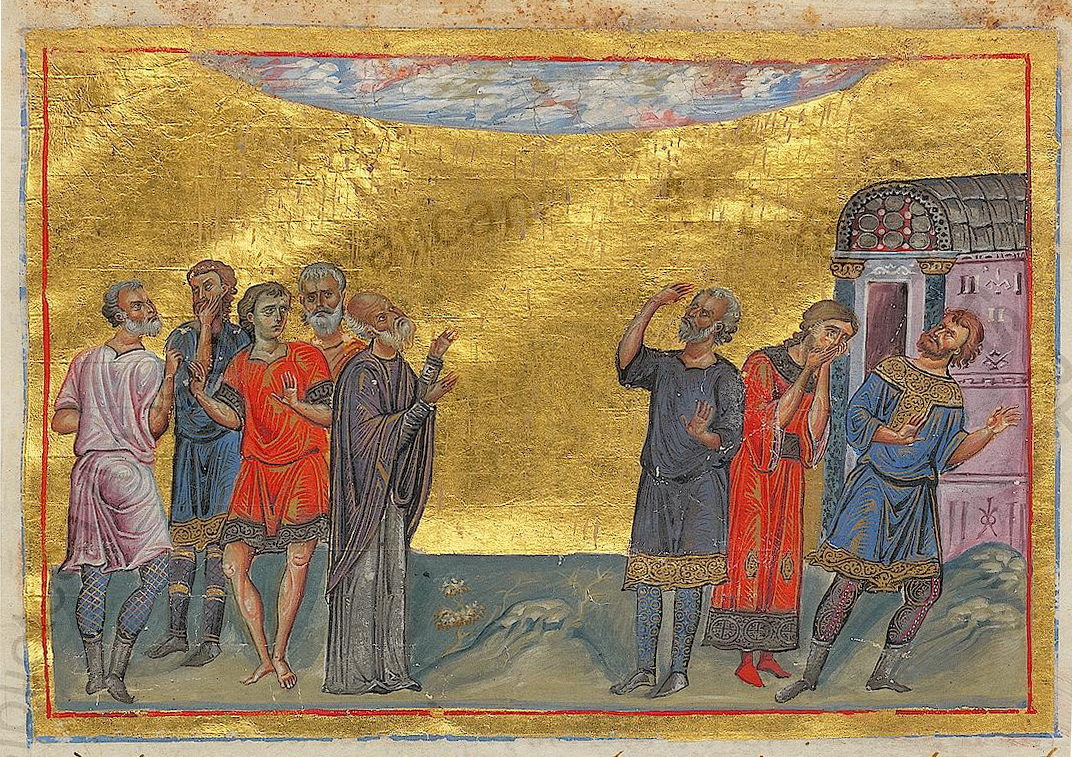
Commemoration of the falling of ash from the sky in Constantinople.
(Menologion of Basil II, 10th century).

== Sources ==
- November 6/November 19. Orthodox Calendar (PRAVOSLAVIE.RU).
- November 19 / November 6. HOLY TRINITY RUSSIAN ORTHODOX CHURCH (A parish of the Patriarchate of Moscow).
- November 6. OCA - The Lives of the Saints.
- The Autonomous Orthodox Metropolia of Western Europe and the Americas (ROCOR). St. Hilarion Calendar of Saints for the year of our Lord 2004. St. Hilarion Press (Austin, TX). p. 83.
- The Sixth Day of the Month of November. Orthodoxy in China.
- November 6. Latin Saints of the Orthodox Patriarchate of Rome.
- The Roman Martyrology. Transl. by the Archbishop of Baltimore. Last Edition, According to the Copy Printed at Rome in 1914. Revised Edition, with the Imprimatur of His Eminence Cardinal Gibbons. Baltimore: John Murphy Company, 1916. p. 343.
- Rev. Richard Stanton. A Menology of England and Wales, or, Brief Memorials of the Ancient British and English Saints Arranged According to the Calendar, Together with the Martyrs of the 16th and 17th Centuries. London: Burns & Oates, 1892. pp. 526–528.

Greek Sources

- Great Synaxaristes: (in Greek) 6 ΝΟΕΜΒΡΙΟΥ. ΜΕΓΑΣ ΣΥΝΑΞΑΡΙΣΤΗΣ.
- (in Greek) Συναξαριστής. 6 Νοεμβρίου. ECCLESIA.GR. (H ΕΚΚΛΗΣΙΑ ΤΗΣ ΕΛΛΑΔΟΣ).
- (in Greek) 06/11/2015. Ορθόδοξος Συναξαριστής.

Russian Sources

- (in Russian) 19 ноября (6 ноября). Православная Энциклопедия под редакцией Патриарха Московского и всея Руси Кирилла (электронная версия). (Orthodox Encyclopedia - Pravenc.ru).
- (in Russian) 6 ноября по старому стилю / 19 ноября по новому стилю. Русская Православная Церковь - Православный церковный календарь на 2015 год.
