= Jeanne Bohec =

French resistance fighter (1919–2010)

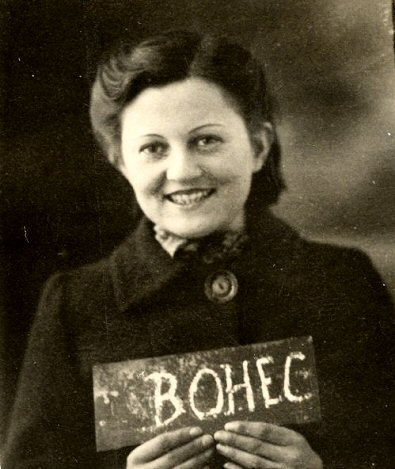
- Jeanne Bohec, circa 1940
- Born: 16 February 1919; Tourlaville, Normandy
- Died: 11 January 2010 (aged 90); Paris
- Resting place: Plestin-les-Grèves
- Occupations: Explosives expert, resistance fighter, math teacher
- Known for: Sabotage in occupied France

Jeanne Bohec (born 16 February 1919 in Tourlaville in Normandy; died 11 January 2010) was a French Resistance fighter.

After enlisting in the Women's Volunteer Corps of the Free French Forces, she joined the Central Intelligence and Action Bureau and learned sabotage techniques. She parachuted into occupied France in February 1944 and then conducted her work in the resistance by criss-crossing Brittany by bicycle; hence, her nickname “the bomber on a bicycle”. She trained teams of saboteurs, organized and took part in several sabotage operations and participated in the liberation of France.

After the war, she became a professor of mathematics and deputy mayor of the 18th arrondissement of Paris. She wrote a book describing her involvement in the Resistance: La Plastiqueuse à bicyclette (The Bomber on a Bicycle).

On 10 April 1975 Jacques Chaban-Delmas stated: "At a time when the equivalence between women and men is the subject of many speeches or is the subject of many measures, Jeanne Bohec provides striking proof that women are quite capable of attaining a degree of courage, determination and efficiency accessible to few men."

== Early life ==
Jeanne Bohec was born in 1919 in Tourlaville in Normandy. The daughter of a navy sailor, she moved many times during her childhood. With her family, she settled successively in the port cities of Cherbourg, Brest, Toulon and Rochefort. At the age of 10, she settled permanently in Angers where her father had just obtained a job after retiring from the French navy. It was there that Bohec began studying mathematics and sciences in 1939. She passed her baccalaureate in Angers just as World War II started.

== Nazi invasion and occupation ==
=== Brest ===
In March 1940, she accepted a job offer to be a chemist's assistant at the Moulin-Blanc explosives factory in Brest. This job did not last long. On 10 May 1940 the Nazi invasion of Belgium began, followed by the Wehrmacht's rapid incursion into France. The blitzkrieg was launched. The lab Bohec was working for was moved to a tunnel in order to escape the bombings. At the beginning of June 1940, defeatist attitudes were gaining ground. To a colleague who asserted that the Germans could no longer be stopped, Bohec replied: “I will not stay here to work with them, I will go to England. I will find a boat”.

=== Departure for Great Britain ===
According to Bohec's memoire, “18 June 1940 began like any other day.” Then, hours before the expected arrival of the first Germans in the city of Brest, the employees of the explosives factory where she worked were ordered to leave. Bohec returned to her home and decided to flee to Great Britain.

She hurried to the port of Brest, where she discovered the Abeille 4, a tugboat, preparing to leave for England. According to her memoir, “A few minutes later, we weighed anchor. On board were five or six crewmen with two or three of their wives, and a family of four accompanied by their dog”. It was 7 p.m. and the following day the Germans occupied the city of Brest.

The Abeille 4 dropped anchor in the port of Plymouth, where its passengers had to wait two days before being allowed to land. On 21 June their disembarkation was authorized and double-decker buses transported them to a sorting center. A few hours later, Bohec took the train to London, along with other refugees.

=== London ===
The group was housed in a school in the London suburbs, the L.C.C Anerly school. After verification that she was not a spy, Bohec was placed as a paid companion (dame de compagnie) in an English family. This domestic position did not suit her; she wanted to join the fight to liberate occupied France.

Bohec joined the Women's Volunteer Corps of the Free French Forces in January 1941. She worked first as a secretary to the technical and armament office at Carlton Gardens. Then, from the spring of 1942, she put her professional experience as a chemist to use by joining an explosives laboratory that studied how to manufacture explosives from products that could be bought in drugstores or pharmacies in France.

A year later, in August 1943, Henri Frenay intervened on her behalf, allowing her to join the Central Intelligence and Action Bureau (BCRA). There, she was given training to become an instructor in the handling of explosives during sabotage operations.

=== Parachuting into occupied France ===
On the night of 29 February 1944 Bohec (alias "Rateau" and later "Micheline") boarded a Halifax of RAF No. 138 Squadron and jumped onto the clandestine airfield "Ouragan", near Assé-le -Boisne, in the Alençon region. She was one of a total of five women parachuted into France. She was received there by Jean-François Clouët des Pesruches (alias "Galilée"), head of the Air Operations Office for the western region. He had been informed of her arrival by a broadcast message from Radio London; "The coiling boa will bring you a little one". An account stated that soldiers mistook her for a child when she landed.

On 8 March Bohec got off a train at Questembert station in the Morbihan. Her mission was clear: she was to provide training in the handling of explosives to the resistance fighters who were to enter into action after the launch of so-called 'Green Plan'. The 'Green Plan' called on the Resistance to sabotage railway tracks and communications during and after the D-Day landing in order to hinder Germans troop movements to Normandy.

For several weeks, Bohec criss-crossed the French countryside on a bicycle arousing little suspicion among the Occupation forces. In addition to the explosives training that she gave to Resistance fighters, she actively participated in sabotage operations. On 7 May 1944 she blew up an 11-meter rail near the Roc Saint-André station in the Morbihan. On the evening of 18 June the resistance stronghold where she was staying was attacked by German troops. She managed to flee to Quimper and she actively contributed to the liberation of the city on 8 August.

Since she knew how to handle weapons, Bohec asked to take part in subsequent fighting for the liberation of France, but she was not allowed to bear arms. Towards the end of the war, after the arrival of new male volunteers in the Resistance, she was no longer entrusted with important missions. She regretted not being to fight during the final phases of the liberation of France.

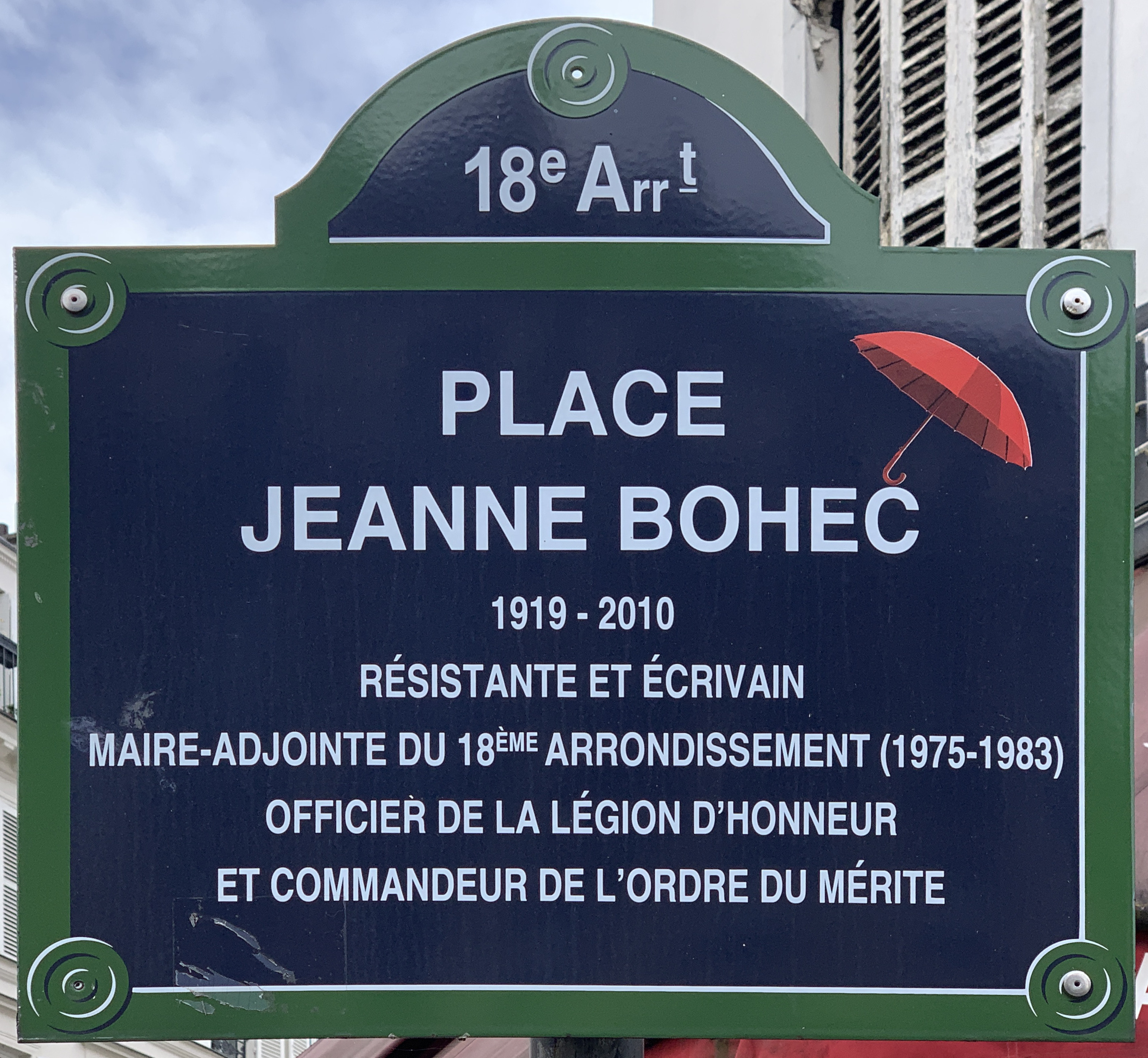
Commemorative plaque in the 18th arrondissement of Paris

== Après-guerre ==
After the war, Bohec was decorated with the Legion of Honor, the Croix de guerre and the Resistance medal. She finished her studies and worked until 1980 as a mathematics teacher at the Roland Dorgelès college in the 18th arrondissement of Paris. From 1975 to 1983, she was deputy mayor of this arrondissement, where she lived on the Avenue Junot, in Montmartre. She died on 11 January 2010, and is buried in Plestin-les-Grèves.
