= Canton of Plestin-les-Grèves =

Canton of France

Coordinates: 48.66°N 3.63°W

The canton of Plestin-les-Grèves is an administrative division of the Côtes-d'Armor department, northwestern France. Its borders were modified at the French canton reorganisation which came into effect in March 2015. Its seat is in Plestin-les-Grèves.

It consists of the following communes:

1. Lanvellec
2. Loguivy-Plougras
3. Plestin-les-Grèves
4. Plouaret
5. Ploubezre
6. Plougras
7. Ploumilliau
8. Plounérin
9. Plounévez-Moëdec
10. Plouzélambre
11. Plufur
12. Saint-Michel-en-Grève
13. Trédrez-Locquémeau
14. Tréduder
15. Trégrom
16. Trémel
17. Le Vieux-Marché
