= Plounérin =

Plounérin Plounerin
- Commune
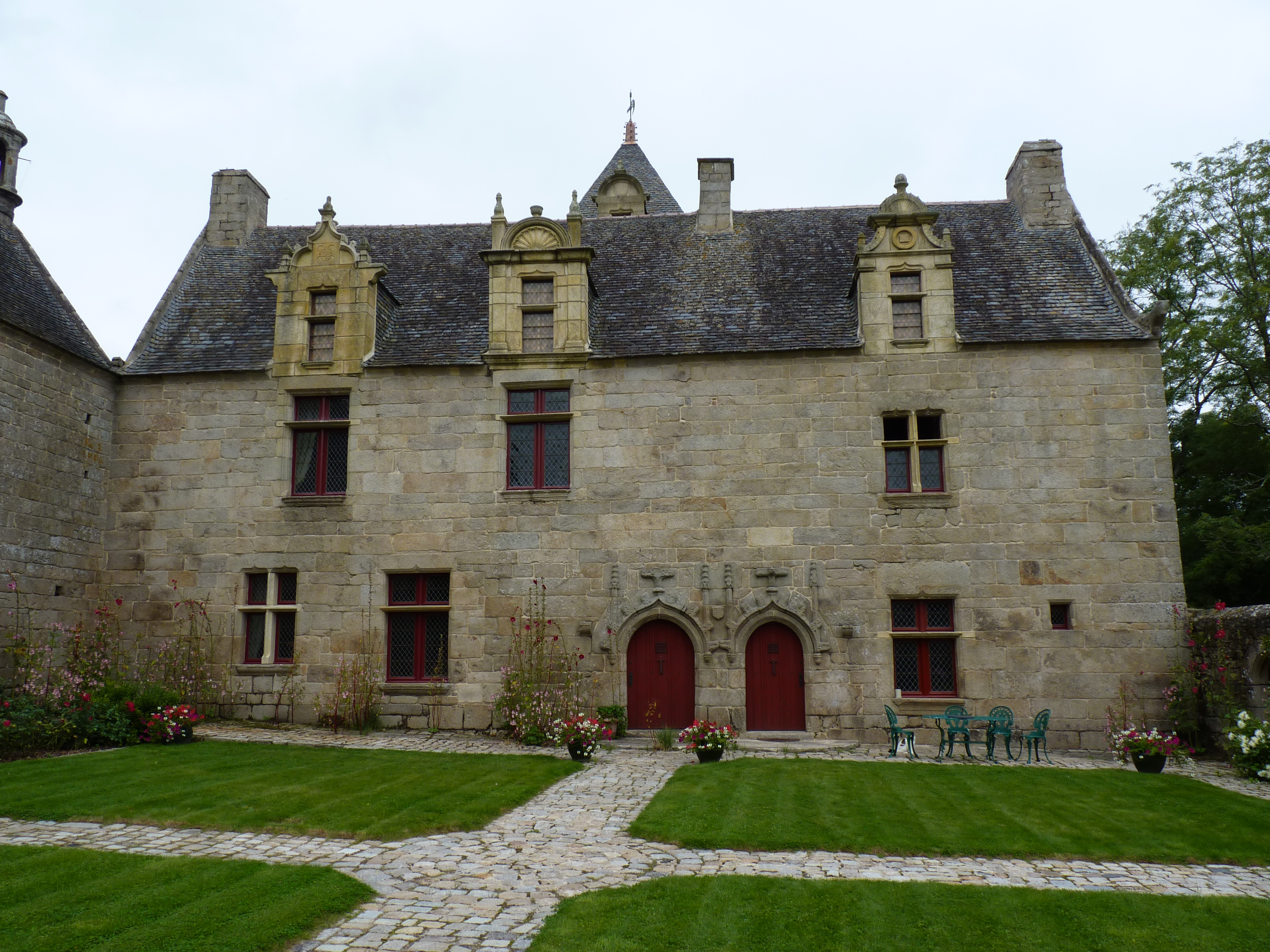
- Lesmoal Manor, in Plounérin
- Location of Plounérin
- Location within France Location within Brittany
- Coordinates: 48°34′03″N 3°32′24″W
- Country: France
- Region: Brittany
- Department: Côtes-d'Armor
- Arrondissement: Lannion
- Canton: Plestin-les-Grèves
- Intercommunality: Lannion-Trégor Communauté

Government
  - Mayor (2020–2026): Patrick L'Héréec
- Area^{1}: 25.89 km^{2} (10.00 sq mi)
- Highest elevation: 247 m (810 ft)
- Lowest elevation: 105 m (344 ft)
- Population (2023): 798
  - Density: 30.8/km^{2} (79.8/sq mi)
- Time zone: UTC+01:00 (CET)
  - Summer (DST): UTC+02:00 (CEST)
- INSEE/Postal code: 22227 /22780
- ^{1} French Land Register data, which excludes lakes, ponds, glaciers > 1 km^{2} (0.386 sq mi or 247 acres) and river estuaries.

Plounérin (French pronunciation: [pluneʁɛ̃]; Breton: Plounerin) is a commune in the Côtes-d'Armor department of Brittany in northwestern France.

== Population ==
Inhabitants of Plounérin are called plounérinais in French.

== Breton language ==
The municipality launched a linguistic plan through Ya d'ar brezhoneg on 29 July 2005.

== See also ==
- Communes of the Côtes-d'Armor department
