= Plestin-les-Grèves =

Plestin-les-Grèves Plistin
- Commune
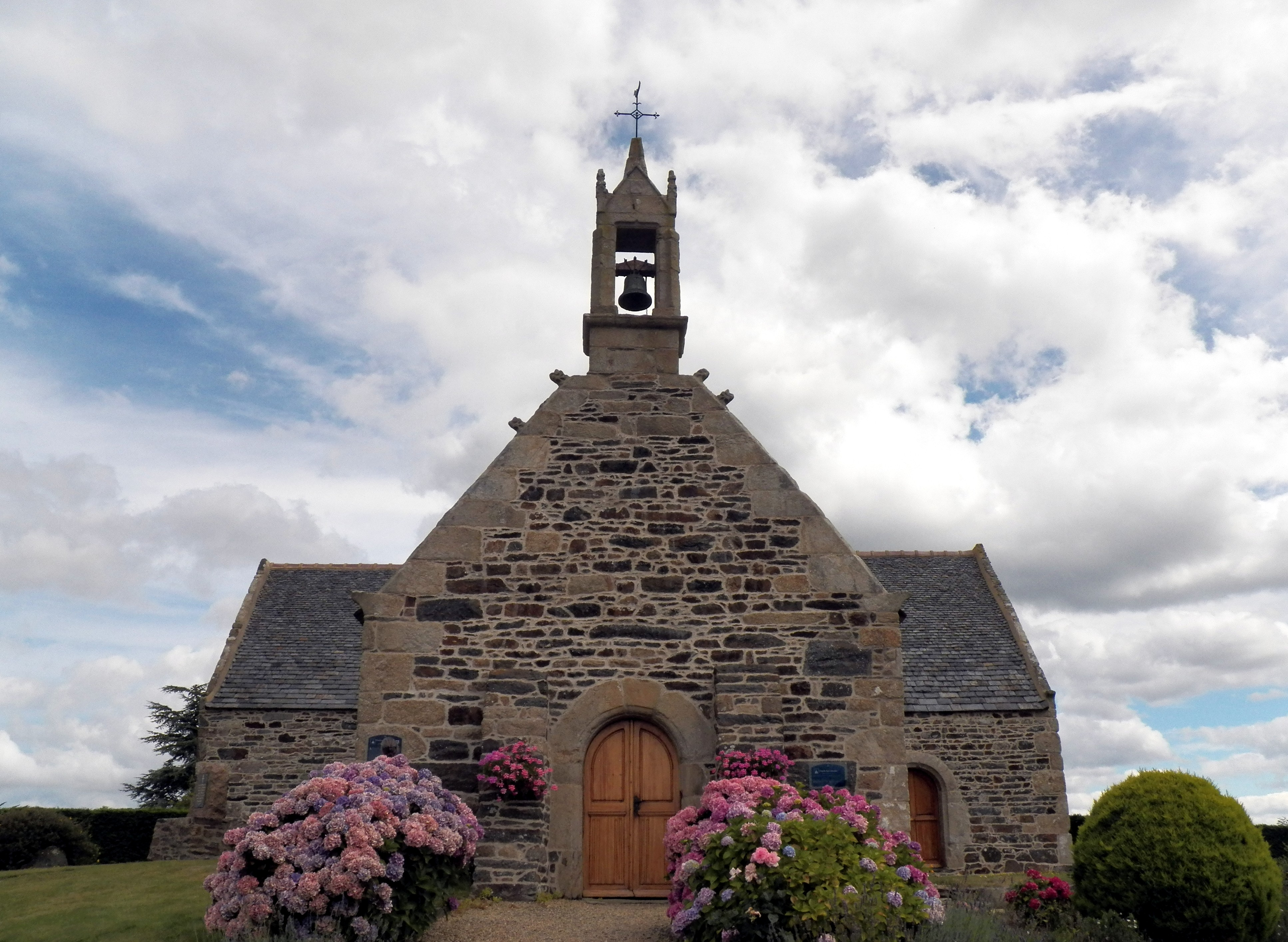
- The chapel of Saint Sébastien

- Coat of arms
- Location of Plestin-les-Grèves
- Location within France Location within Brittany
- Coordinates: 48°39′28″N 3°37′47″W
- Country: France
- Region: Brittany
- Department: Côtes-d'Armor
- Arrondissement: Lannion
- Canton: Plestin-les-Grèves
- Intercommunality: Lannion-Trégor Communauté

Government
  - Mayor (2020–2026): Christian Jeffroy
- Area^{1}: 34.52 km^{2} (13.33 sq mi)
- Highest elevation: 127 m (417 ft)
- Lowest elevation: 0 m (0 ft)
- Population (2023): 3,639
  - Density: 105.4/km^{2} (273.0/sq mi)
- Time zone: UTC+01:00 (CET)
  - Summer (DST): UTC+02:00 (CEST)
- INSEE/Postal code: 22194 /22310
- ^{1} French Land Register data, which excludes lakes, ponds, glaciers > 1 km^{2} (0.386 sq mi or 247 acres) and river estuaries.

Plestin-les-Grèves (French pronunciation: [plɛstɛ̃ le ɡʁɛv]; Breton: Plistin) is a commune in the Côtes-d'Armor department of Brittany in north-western France.

Plestin-les-Grèves is situated on the north coast of Brittany, with a sailing club in Stefflam and Loquirec. There are a few riding schools. Plestin-les-Grèves is twinned with Launceston in Cornwall, United Kingdom

== Population ==
Inhabitants of Plestin-les-Grèves are called in French plestinais.

Historical population
Year	Pop.	±% p.a.
1968	2,912	—
1975	3,018	+0.51%
1982	3,222	+0.94%
1990	3,237	+0.06%
1999	3,415	+0.60%
2007	3,701	+1.01%
2012	3,660	−0.22%
2017	3,591	−0.38%
2023	3,639	+0.22%
Source: INSEE

== Breton language ==
The municipality launched a linguistic plan through Ya d'ar brezhoneg on 8 March 2006.

In 2008, 29.64% of primary school children attended bilingual schools.

== See also ==
- Communes of the Côtes-d'Armor department
- Jeanne Bohec
- Colonel Bob Stewart
