= Nepali calendar =

Nepali calendar may refer to:

- Vikram Samvat, the official calendar in Nepal
- Nepal Sambat, the ceremonial calendar in Nepal
