= Guy Autret de Missirien =

Guy Autret de Missirien, Lord of Missirien, Lesergué, Kergoz, etc., was a French historian and genealogist born around 1599 in Goulien, Province of Brittany, France and died in Paris on 3 April 1660.

He was the second son of Yves Autret, Lord of Lesoualc'h, etc. and Marie Du Menez. He had Guy Éder de La Fontenelle as a godfather - who, during the wars of the League, killed Guy Autret's grandfather.

== Works ==
In 1637, he published the Annotations sur les lettres patentes du Roy portant commission de convoquer le ban et l'arrière-ban de Bretagne…

He wrote two articles for the Gazette de France on the return of Henriette de France, in 1644.

In 1655 he edited a Vie de saint Joachim today lost.

The same year, he published his Dessein et projet de l'histoire généalogique de Bretagne. However, this "Histoire généalogique de Bretagne" was unfinished at his death.

He re-edited and augmented the Vie des Saints de la Bretagne by Albert Le Grand, in 1659.

His correspondence with Pierre d'Hozier was published in 1899 by the Comte de Rosmorduc. Another part of the correspondence was published in 1940 by Daniel Bernard.

== Bibliography ==
- Rosmorduc (comte de), Lettres inédites de Guy Autret, seigneur de Missirien, correspondent de Pierre d'Hozier en Basse-Bretagne. 1635-1660, the author, Saint-Brieuc, 1899
- Henri Waquet, "Messire Guy Autret sieur de Missirien et de Lesergué", in Mémoires de la Société d'Histoire et d'Archéologie de Bretagne, volume XXII.
