= Lake Keret =

Lake in Republic of Karelia, Russia

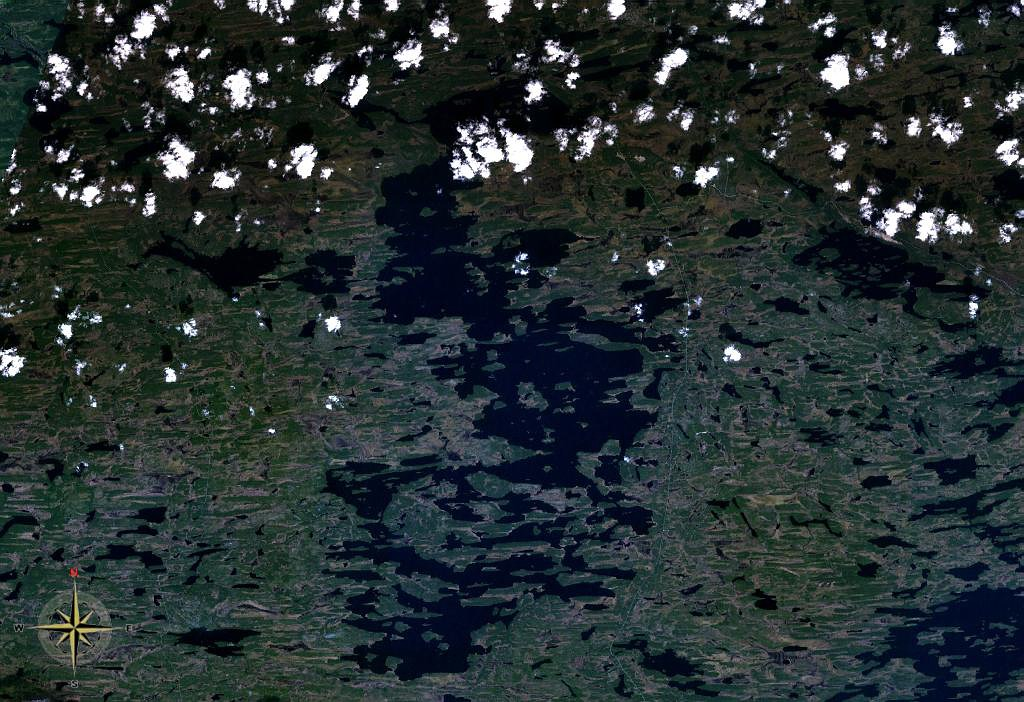
- from space

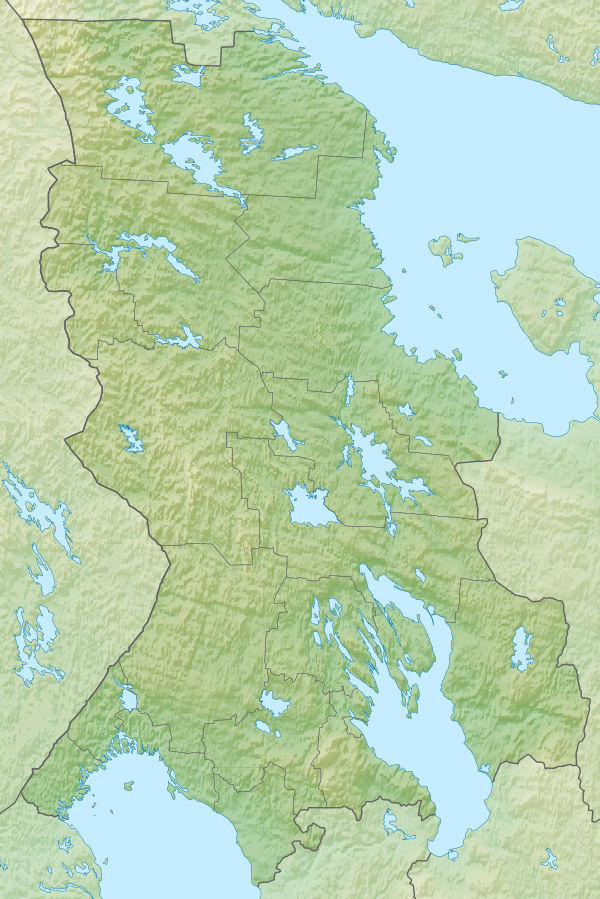
- Location within Karelia Location within Russia
- Location: Republic of Karelia
- Coordinates: 65.916667°N 32.93333°E
- Basin countries: Russia
- Surface area: 223 km^{2} (86 sq mi)
- Frozen: November–May
- Islands: 130

Lake Keret (Russian: Кереть, Finnish: Kierettijärvi) is a large freshwater lake in the Republic of Karelia, northwestern part of Russia. It has an area of 223 km^{2}. There are about 130 islands on the lake. Keret is used for fishery. Lake Keret freezes up in early November and stays icebound until late May.

== History ==
On 5 September 1965, an Antonov An-2 plane crashed into the lake, with one person killed.
