= Ya d'ar brezhoneg =

Language movement in France

Ya d'ar brezhoneg (French: Oui au breton 'Yes to Breton') is a campaign started in the 21st century by the Ofis ar Brezhoneg ('Office of the Breton Language') to promote and stimulate the use of the Breton language in daily life in Brittany, northwestern France. Breton is a Brythonic Celtic language which has fallen out of general use since the mid-20th century. Efforts are underway in the region to revive the language, which is classified by UNESCO as endangered.

== Charter for private sectors ==
With the first phase of Ya d'ar brezhoneg, started on 5 October 2001, the office worked to promote the use of the Breton language within civil society. The office would certify businesses, social services and non-governmental organizations at three levels:

1. Soutien à la langue bretonne (English: Support for the Breton language)
  This label is given to entities that broadly use Breton in their communications. These organizations support the Breton language since they spread the language through their daily functioning, through their public image as a bilingual organization. However this level does not mean that they are accessible to the public in Breton, or work in Breton. Printed documents may be bilingual (rather than exclusively in Breton) but both languages must be presented equally.
2. En breton s’il vous plaît (English: In Breton please)
  This label is given to organizations that offer their services in the Breton language.
3. Travailler en breton (English: Working in Breton)
  This label is given to organizations in which the working language is Breton.

By 2006 the charter had gained signed agreement by 579 businesses, social services and non-governmental organizations to support the use of Breton in their operations.

== Charter for local authorities ==
In the second phase, started on 22 December 2004, Ya d'ar brezhoneg added a charter for local authorities in Brittany. The office encourages communes to promote the use of Breton, for instance, by installing bilingual (Breton and French) road signs, and creating bilingual promotion posters for local events, in order to promote the use of Breton in daily life.

=== Levels of the charter ===
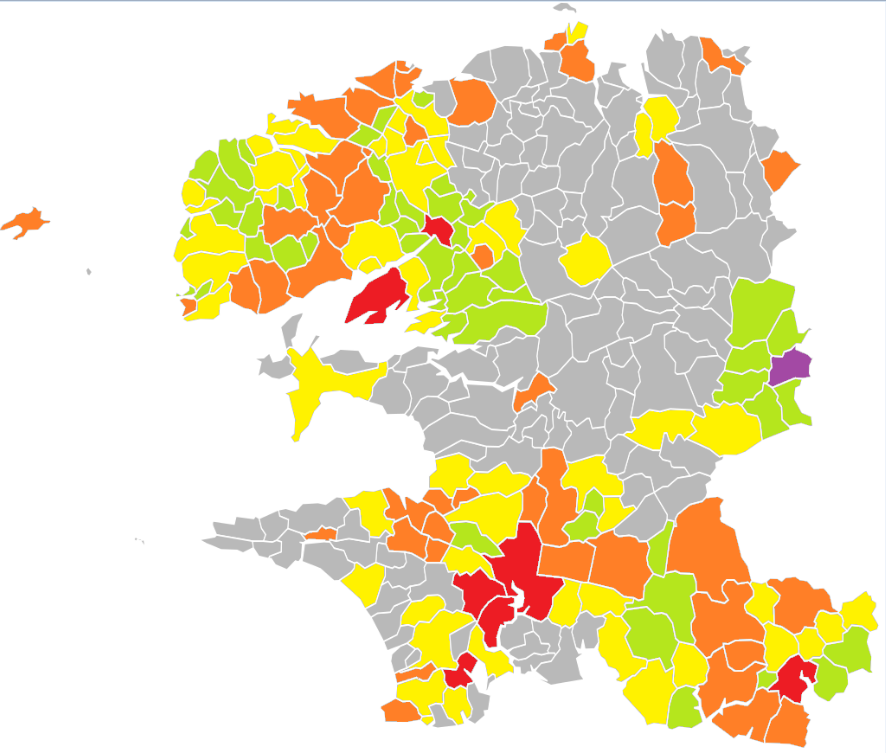
Map of the participating municipalities in Finistère (2019). Level 1 convention Level 2 convention Level 3 convention Level 4 convention Intercommunity conventionned town

The charter for local authorities is organized into four levels, each with an increasing number of requirements. If a municipality meets the objectives it is certified "Ya d'ar brezoneg" at either level 1, 2, 3 or 4 and can move to that level.
