= List of islands by name (I) =

This article features a list of islands sorted by their name beginning with the letter I.

== I ==
Island's name	Island group(s)	Country/Countries
Ibicuy	Paraná Delta	Argentina
Ibiza	Balearic Islands	Spain
Iceland		Iceland
Ida	Torres Strait Islands, Queensland	Australia
Idanha	Beira Baixa islands	Portugal
Idjwi	Lake Kivu	Democratic Republic of the Congo
Iejima	Okinawa Islands part of the Ryukyu Islands	Japan
Iheyajima	Okinawa Islands part of the Ryukyu Islands	Japan
IJsselmonde	South Holland	Netherlands
Ikaria		Greece
Ikema	Miyako Islands part of the Sakishima Islands part of the Ryukyu Islands	Japan
Île Aganton	English Channel	France
Île d'Ouessant	English Channel	France
Île d'Yeu	Pays de la Loire	France
Île-d'Aix		France
Île-d'Arz	Gulf of Morbihan	France
Île des Sœurs	Bassin de Laprairie	Canada
Île-Grande	English Channel	France
Île Milliau	English Channel	France
Île Sainte-Marguerite	Lérins Islands	France
Îles-de-Boucherville	St. Lawrence River	Canada
Îlot Saint-Ferréol	Lérins Islands	France
Île Saint-Honorat	Lérins Islands	France
Îles Sainte-Thérèse	St. Lawrence River	Canada
Îlot de la Tradelière	Lérins Islands	France
Îles d'Hyères	Île du Levant, Île de Porquerolles, and Île de Port-Cros	
Ilha Grande		Brazil
Ilhas Cagarras	Guanabara Bay	Brazil
Ilovik	Adriatic Sea	Croatia
Inaccessible	Tristan da Cunha	(United Kingdom) British overseas territory of Saint Helena, Ascension and Tristan da Cunha
Inaccessible	South Orkney Islands	Claimed by: United Kingdom as part of the Falkland Islands and by Argentina
Inaccessible	Dellbridge Islands	Antarctica
Inexpressible		Claimed by: New Zealand, Antarctica
Indian	Rock River, Illinois	United States
Indian	Lake Huron, Ontario	Canada
Ingarö		Sweden
Ingram	Queensland	Australia
Inhaca		Mozambique
Inish Beg	Lough Erne	United Kingdom
Inish Conra		Ireland
Inish Davar		Ireland
Inish Divann		Ireland
Inish Doney	Lough Erne	Ireland
Inish Fovar	Lough Erne	Ireland
Inish Free	Lough Gill	Ireland
Inish Lougher	Lough Erne	Ireland
Inish More	Lough Erne	Ireland
Inishbiggle	County Mayo	Ireland
Inishbofin	County Donegal	Ireland
Inishbofin	County Galway	Ireland
Inishcorkish	Upper Lough Erne	Ireland
Inisheer	Aran Islands	Ireland
Inishkea North	County Galway	Ireland
Inishkea South	County Galway	Ireland
Inishleague	Lough Erne	Ireland
Inishlirroo	Upper Lough Erne	Ireland
Inishlught	Upper Lough Erne	Ireland
Inishmaan	Aran Islands	Ireland
Inishmacsaint	Lough Erne	Ireland
Inishmakill	Lough Erne	Ireland
Inishmore	Aran Islands	Ireland
Inishmurray		Ireland
Inishark		Ireland
Inishturk	Lough Erne	Ireland
Innarahu	Baltic Sea	Estonia
Innetalling	Hudson Bay, Nunavut	Canada
Innisfallen	Lough Leane	Ireland
Insua	Minho islands	Portugal
Iona	Inner Hebrides	Scotland
Iona	Strait of Georgia	Canada
Iona	Placentia Bay	Canada
Iona	Hudson River	United States
Ios	Cyclades	Greece
Iowa	Mississippi River, Illinois	United States
Irabu	Miyako Islands part of the Sakishima Islands part of the Ryukyu Islands	Japan
Irakleia	Cyclades	Greece
Ireland (island)		Ireland, United Kingdom
Ireland's Eye	County Dublin	Ireland
Iriomote	Yaeyama Islands part of the Sakishima Islands part of the Ryukyu Islands	Japan
Ischia	Gulf of Naples	Italy
Ishigaki	Yaeyama Islands part of the Sakishima Islands part of the Ryukyu Islands	Japan
Island 526	Mississippi River, Missouri	United States
Island No. 8	Mississippi River, Kentucky	United States
Island No. 21	Mississippi River, Tennessee	United States
Island No. 30	Mississippi River, Tennessee and Arkansas	United States
Island No. 63	Mississippi River, Mississippi	United States
Island No. 317	Mississippi River, Illinois	United States
Island of Montreal	Quebec	Canada
Islands of St. Paul	Maltese islands	Malta
Islas Cíes	belonging to the Spanish province of Pontevedra, in Galicia	Spain
Islay	Inner Hebrides	Scotland
Isle of Man	Irish Sea	(United Kingdom) Crown dependency
Isle of Rest	Georgian Bay	Canada
Isle of Thanet	British Isles	United Kingdom
Isle of Wight	In Roman times was referred to as Vectis	United Kingdom
Isle of Youth	Greater Antilles	Cuba
Isola di San Michele	Venetian Lagoon	Italy
Isola Maggiore	Lake Trasimeno	Italy
Isra-Tu	Dahlak Archipelago	Eritrea
Ist		Croatia
Itamaracá		Brazil
Ithaca	Ionian Islands	Greece
Itu Aba	Spratly Islands	Administered by Republic of China, Claimed by: China, Vietnam, and Philippines
Isla Ixtapa	Ixtapa/Zihuatanejo, Guerrero	Mexico
Iž		Croatia
Izenajima	Okinawa Islands part of the Ryukyu Islands	Japan

== See also ==
- List of islands (by country)
- List of islands by area
- List of islands by population
- List of islands by highest point
