= Île Aval =

Island in France

Isle of Aval
Native name: Enez-Aval Nickname: Avalon
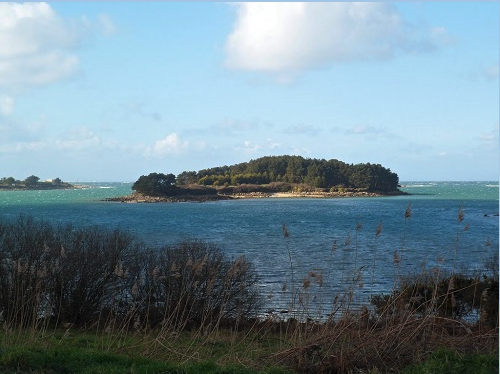
- Ile d’Aval

- Location within Côtes-d'Armor
- Etymology: From the Breton, aval, meaning apple.

Geography
- Location: The Channel
- Coordinates: 48.800636°N 3.575015°W
- Area: 6 ha (15 acres)
- Length: 2 km (1.2 mi)
- Width: 1 km (0.6 mi)

Administration
- France
- Region: Brittany
- Department: Côtes-d'Armor
- Arrondissement: Lannion
- Canton: Tréguier

The Isle of Aval, known as Enez-Aval in Breton and Ile d'Aval in French, is an island in Brittany, situated east of Île-Grande, in the commune of Pleumeur-Bodou and the wider Canton of Tréguier.

== History ==
The charm of the island of Aval with its woods and fine white sands, attracts those who either see it from the mainland, sail around it or even walk or ride around it when the tide is low. A celtic cross, wells, fountains, low stall walls…the ever present traces of its past highlight its history. Known for its natural deposits of pink granite, monks built a monastery on the island in the 6th century in the name of Saint-Marc and later stone carriers and agricultural farmers lived on the island until an abrupt end in 1942. Nazis evicted the farmers and blew up their home.

In the 1950s the island was owned by the Varine family, the owners of the nearby castle of Kerduel. In 1960 the Island was then sold to Jacques Moisan who moved there from Versailles with his entire family. For quite a while they lived in tents on the island while they built it up and cleared it of all the brambles, ferns and gorse. Eventually the family then managed to rebuild the only longère on the island and planted 1500 pine trees.

In 2020 the island was purchased for Euro 2.5 million by Jean-Marie Tassy-Simeoni, founder of advertising agency Uzik and co-founder of the Calvi on the Rocks Festival in Corsica. Jean-Marie now aims to renovate and convert the longère into a beautiful luxury B&B.

== Legend ==
The island is mostly famous today for the tomb of King Arthur at the foot of a large menhir as well as the many legends of Morgan le Fay, the fairy queen of Avalon. According to legend, King Arthur was mortally wounded after the Battle of Camlann. As King Arthur is dying, the lone survivor Bedivere returns Excalibur to the Lady of the Lake, and Morgan and Nimue come to take Arthur to Avalon.

== Archeology ==
In a letter, the late 19th century explorer Lieutenant Rene Robert mentioned coming across the island of Aval as he was traveling by Lannion. In 1878, the father of Félix Le Dantec, claimed (Society of Anthropology of Paris) to have found the remains of the mythical King Arthur at the foot of a menhir in the Merovingian cemetery behind a monastery. By the time Robert got to the site, raiders eager to find treasure had discarded the thirty or so human skeletons and all associated artefacts rendering them difficult, at best, to work with. Not to mention that the religious authorities laid claim to all that remained making it impossible for Robert to send anything back to the labs for further research.

Nevertheless, Robert did manage to get hold of one female skull from a nearby site and drew a sketch of a serpentine stone axe that the local priest showed him. After investigation both the skull and weapon were deemed to be from the very ancient Neolithic era. Eye witness accounts from the same period including the father of Félix Le Dantec, confirmed that they had seen 30 or so human skeletons with just as many horse skeletons. Some claimed that the human remains were placed in a circle around the menhir while others claimed that the human remains were laid in two columns before it.

Archaeologists then didn’t have the same tools as today. What had initially made Robert think that the site was from the Neolithic era was mainly the dolichocephalic shape of the skull he had sent back. However, it was later deemed that this shape meant that the skull belonged to a person of Nordic descent. A further investigation of the horse shoes also seemed to confirm the Nordic theory, placing the death of these people anywhere between the 6th to the 14th centuries. The bones have since been transferred to the cemetery of the Île-Grande.

Alternative theories to the Arthurian legend include: (1) Victims of a 14th-century shipwreck at the time of the Black Prince. Probably English knights. (2) Victims of a 10th-century battle at the time of Alan Barbetorte. Probably Norman vikings.

== Sources ==
- The island of Aval
- The island of Aval and King Arthur
- Aval and the Legend of Avalon
- Database of articles on the island of Aval
