= Île Aganton =

Island in Côtes-d'Armor, France

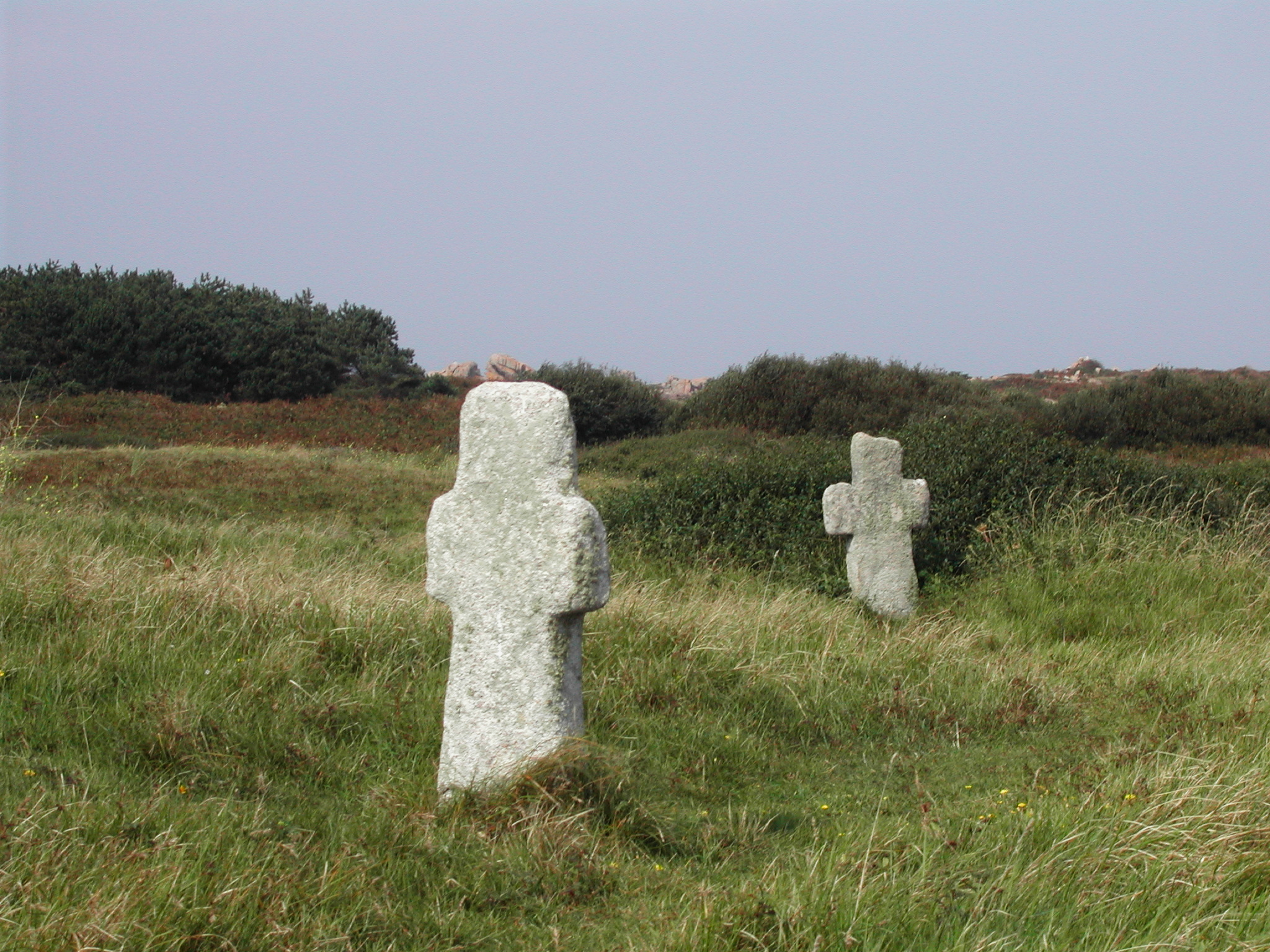
- The two stone crosses on the island

- Location within Côtes-d'Armor

Geography
- Location: English Channel
- Coordinates: 48.7986°N 3.5958°W
- Length: 1,000 m (3000 ft)
- Width: 500 m (1600 ft)

Administration
- France
- Region: Brittany
- Department: Côtes-d'Armor
- Arrondissement: Lannion

Île Aganton (Breton: Enez Aganton) is an island on the north coast of Brittany (France), adjacent to Île-Grande which is to the east. Its size is about 1 km (0.62 mi) west to east, and it has a maximum width of about 500 m (1,600 ft). It is accessible on foot at low tide. It is in the commune of Pleumeur-Bodou (department of Côtes-d'Armor).

On the coast, Trébeurden lies to the south, and Trégastel to the east.

== Details ==
There is no permanent habitation. Dunes cover much of the island; there is heather, and a small pine wood planted in 1920. There are two stone crosses, indication possibly of a burial ground from former times.

The island has three branches; at the ends of each branch there is evidence of past granite-quarrying. The main site of former activity is on the north-east branch, where there is the largest quarry on the island, ruined buildings, and a jetty for loading boats at high tide.

== Gallery ==
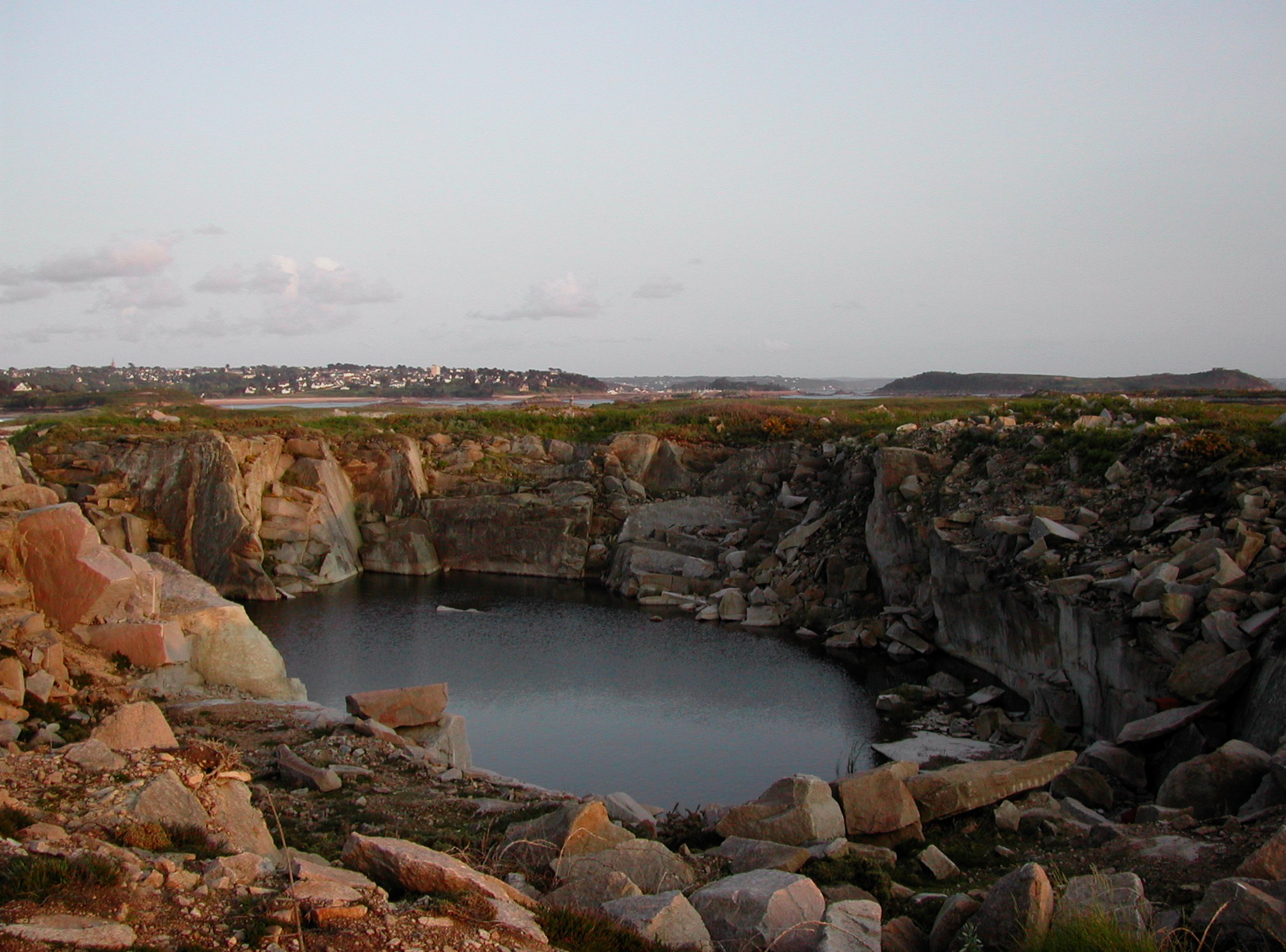
An old quarry

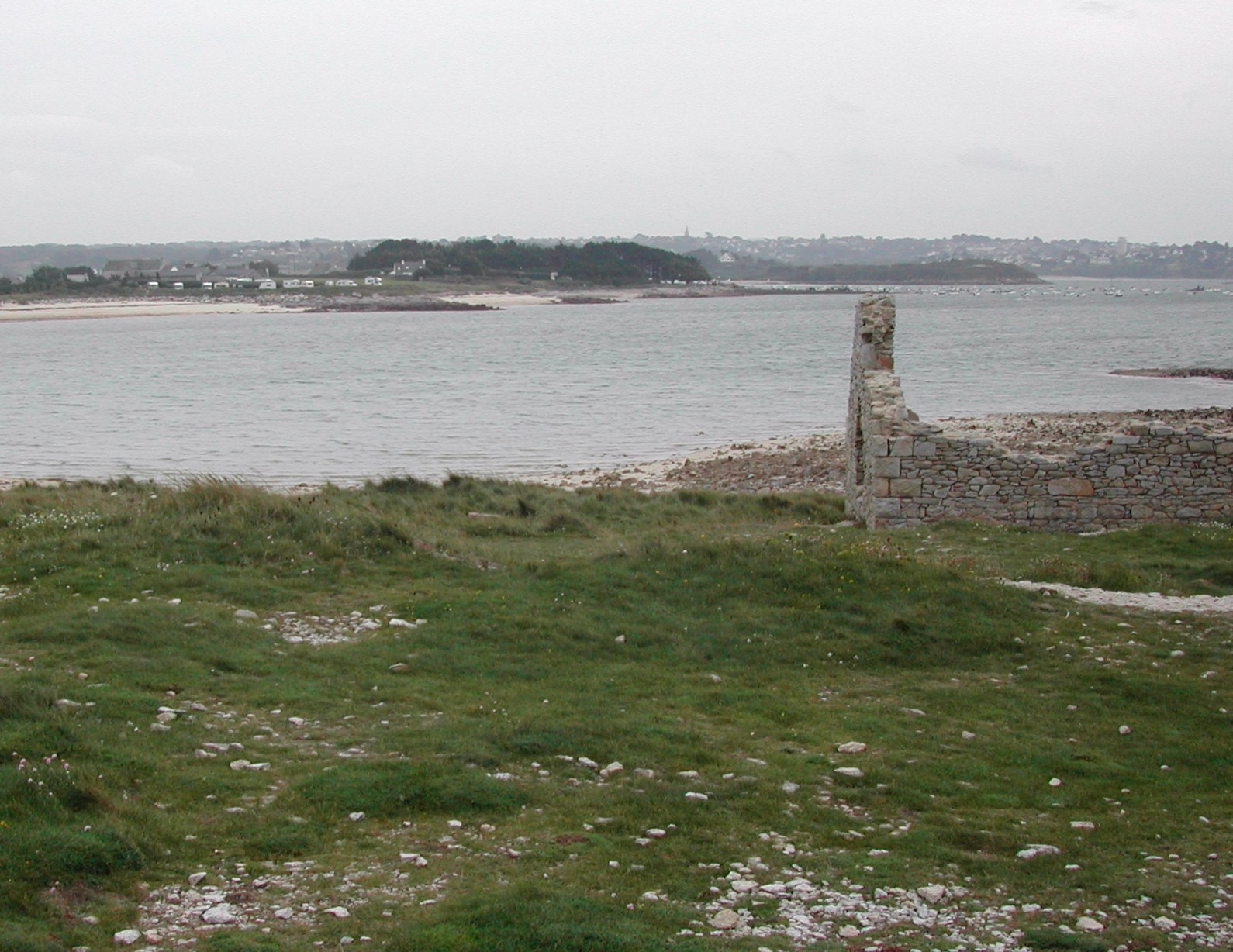
View of Île-Grande from the island

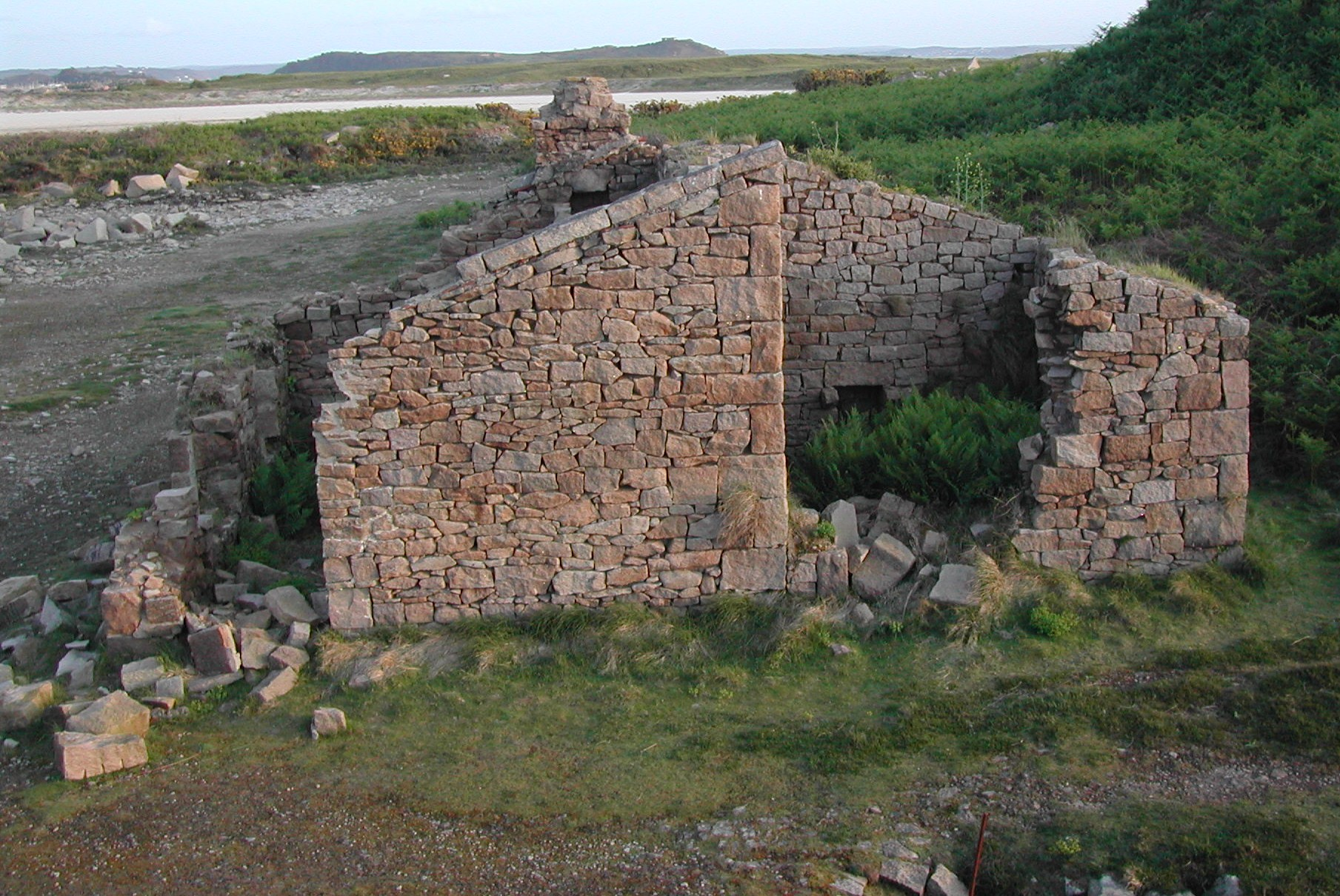
A ruined building by a quarry
