= Château de Kerduel =

Castle in Brittany, France

Native name: Kastell Kerduel
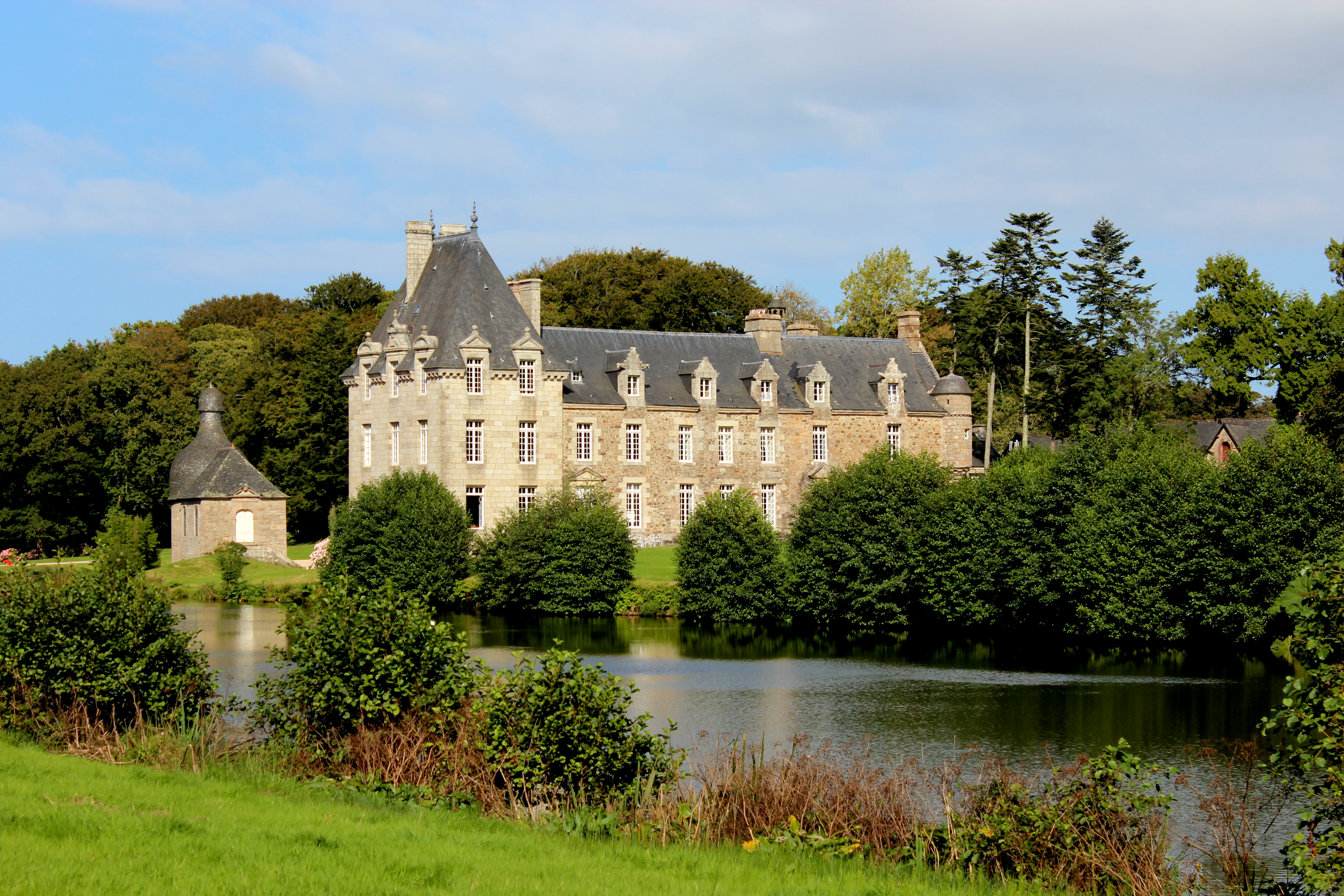
- Kerduel Castle

- Location within Côtes-d'Armor
- Etymology: Kerduel means 'fort of Tuel'

Geography
- Location: The Channel
- Coordinates: 48.763673°N 3.498895°W

Administration
- France
- Region: Brittany
- Department: Côtes-d'Armor
- Arrondissement: Lannion
- Canton: Tréguier

The Château de Kerduel, known as Kastell Kerduel in Breton, is a castle off the coast of northern Brittany, in the commune of Pleumeur-Bodou and the wider Canton of Tréguier. The castle and chapel are situated next to a small stream and lake, and the castle grounds have a large forest surrounding the property. The castle used to have fortified walls, but like many castles, they were removed over time.

== History ==
The oldest part of the castle was built in the 12th century. Other parts of the castle were constructed in the 14th and late 19th centuries, so the castle has different styles.

== Legend ==
Legend has it that King Arthur and the Knights of the Round Table lived at this castle, hence the name of the lodge in the oldest part of the pink granite castle: "Chamber of King Arthur ". By some accounts, in cold winter nights, when the tide is low at sea, King Arthur rises from his tomb on the island of Avalon (assimilated to the nearby island of Aval by the armorican tales) to haunt the grounds of the Castle astride his white horse.

== Art ==
Gustave Jean Jacquet depicted the castle in the background of "La danse."

Œuvre de Gustave Jacquet, 1846-1909

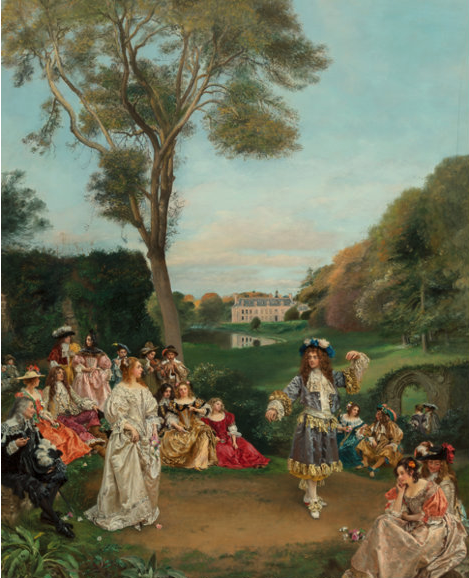
La danse, Château de Kerduel, Comte de Champagny
