= Lorenzo Bettini =

Italian footballer

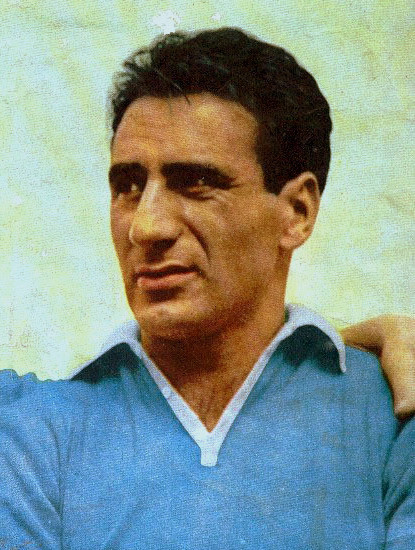
- Bettini with Lazio in 1955

Personal information
- Date of birth: 15 January 1931
- Place of birth: Villanuova sul Clisi, Italy
- Date of death: 21 January 2008 (aged 77)
- Place of death: Gavardo, Italy
- Height: 1.75 m (5 ft 9 in)
- Position: Striker

Senior career*
Years	Team	Apps	(Gls)
1949–1951	Brescia	41	(24)
1951–1952	Roma	25	(9)
1952–1953	Palermo	20	(8)
1953–1954	Roma	16	(9)
1954–1955	Udinese	31	(20)
1955–1957	Lazio	41	(15)
1957–1961	Udinese	125	(49)
1961–1962	Internazionale	24	(8)
1962–1963	Modena	13	(2)
1963–1966	Alessandria	59	(21)
- * Club domestic league appearances and goals

Lorenzo Bettini (born 15 January 1931 in Villanuova sul Clisi; died 21 January 2008 in Gavardo) was an Italian professional football player.

== Professional career ==
Lorenzo Bettini began his professional football career in 1949, signing with Brescia, where he played for two seasons before transferring to AS Roma in 1951. During the 1952–53 season, he was sent on loan to Palermo, returning to Roma after the loan spell concluded on June 30, 1953.

In 1954, he transferred to Udinese, marking the beginning of a significant period in his career. The following year, he joined Lazio, before returning to Udinese again in 1957. His performance caught the attention of Inter Milan, who signed him in 1961 for a fee of €30,000.

After a season at Inter, he moved to Modena in 1962, followed by a transfer to Alessandria in 1963, where he played until his retirement in 1966. Over the course of his career, he featured for a variety of Italian clubs, including several in Serie A and Serie B.
