= Saints associated with the Old North =

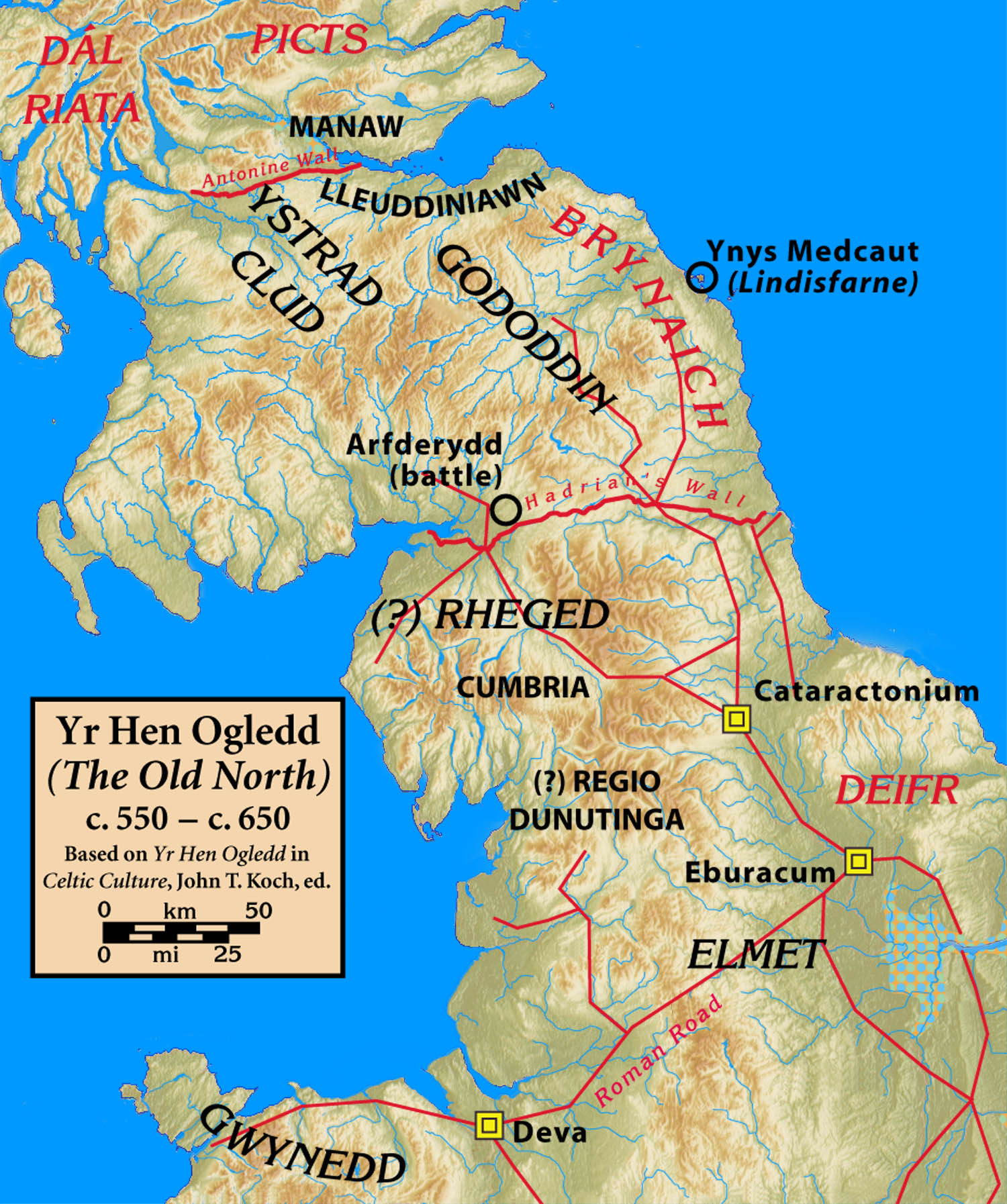
The Old North, Hen Ogledd, in the late 6th & early 7th centuries

This is a list of saints born in, associated with or venerated in the medieval British kingdoms of the Old North of Britain (Hen Ogledd), including Elmet, Rheged, Gododdin, Manaw, Lleuddiniawn and Ystrad Clud.

== Gododdin ==
=== Saint Kentigern ===
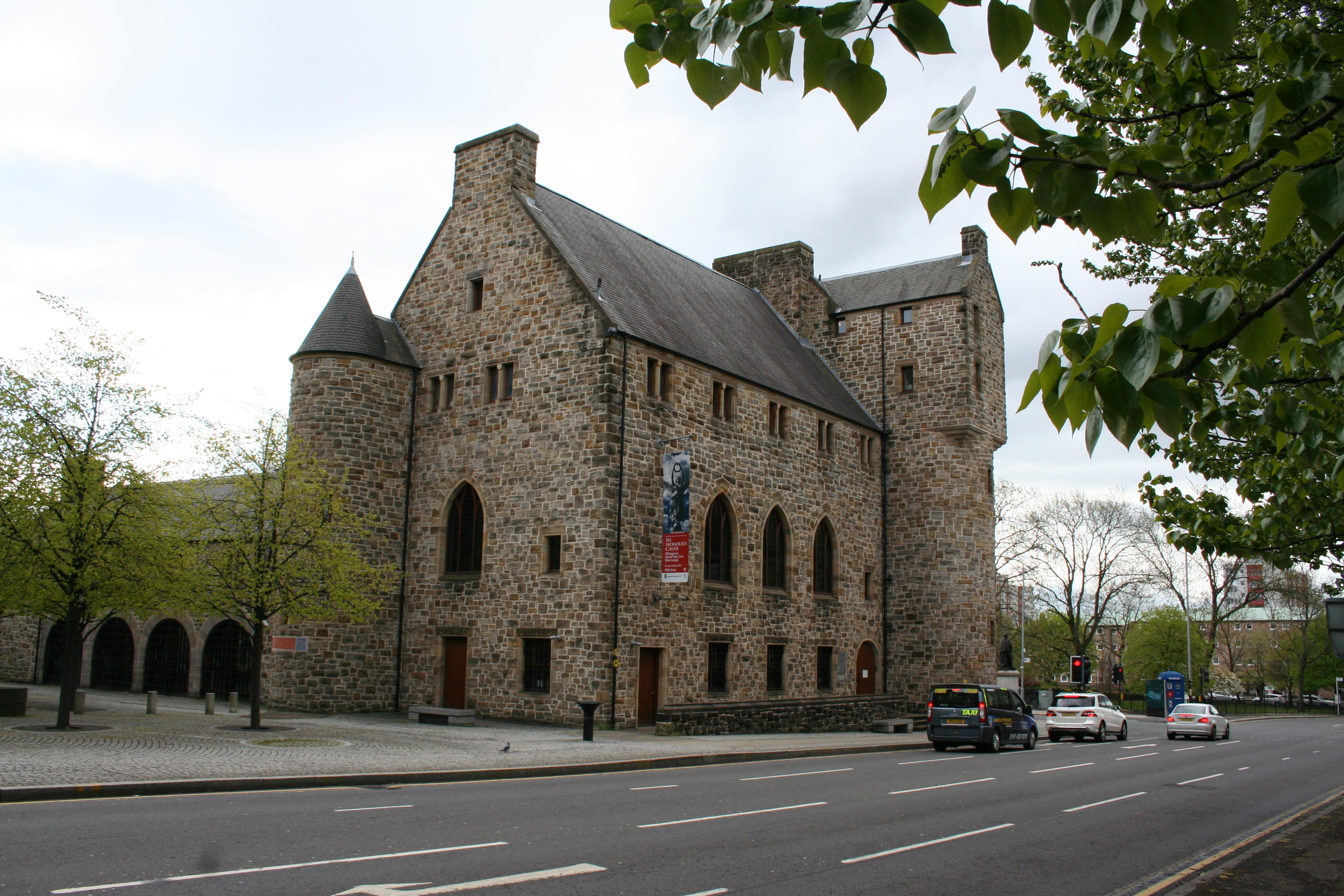
St Mungo Museum of Religious Life and Art, Glasgow. Named after St Kentigern, the museum is one of the only museums in the world dedicated to interfaith relations.

Saint Kentigern (also known as Saint Mungo) is said to have been the son of a princess of Gododdin, Taneu. He is believed to have died around 612 AD. Taneu became pregnant after being raped by the King of Rheged, Owain mab Urien. Later in Kentigern's life, after his expulsion from Pictland, he was invited to live in Ystrad Clud (Strathclyde).

== Ystrad Clud ==
=== Saint Taneu ===
The mother of Saint Kentigern, Taneu was a 6th-century Brittonic princess of Gododdin in the 6th century. She was venerated in Medieval Scotland and Wales, especially in the Clwyd and Glasgow. Together with her son, Kentigern, they are the patron saints of Glasgow. She was said to have been thrown from the cliff of Traprain Law after her father discovered she was pregnant, following a rape by Owain mab Urien. She survived the fall and made her way to Culross, where she gave birth to Kentigern.

== Lleuddiniawn ==
=== Saint Ke ===
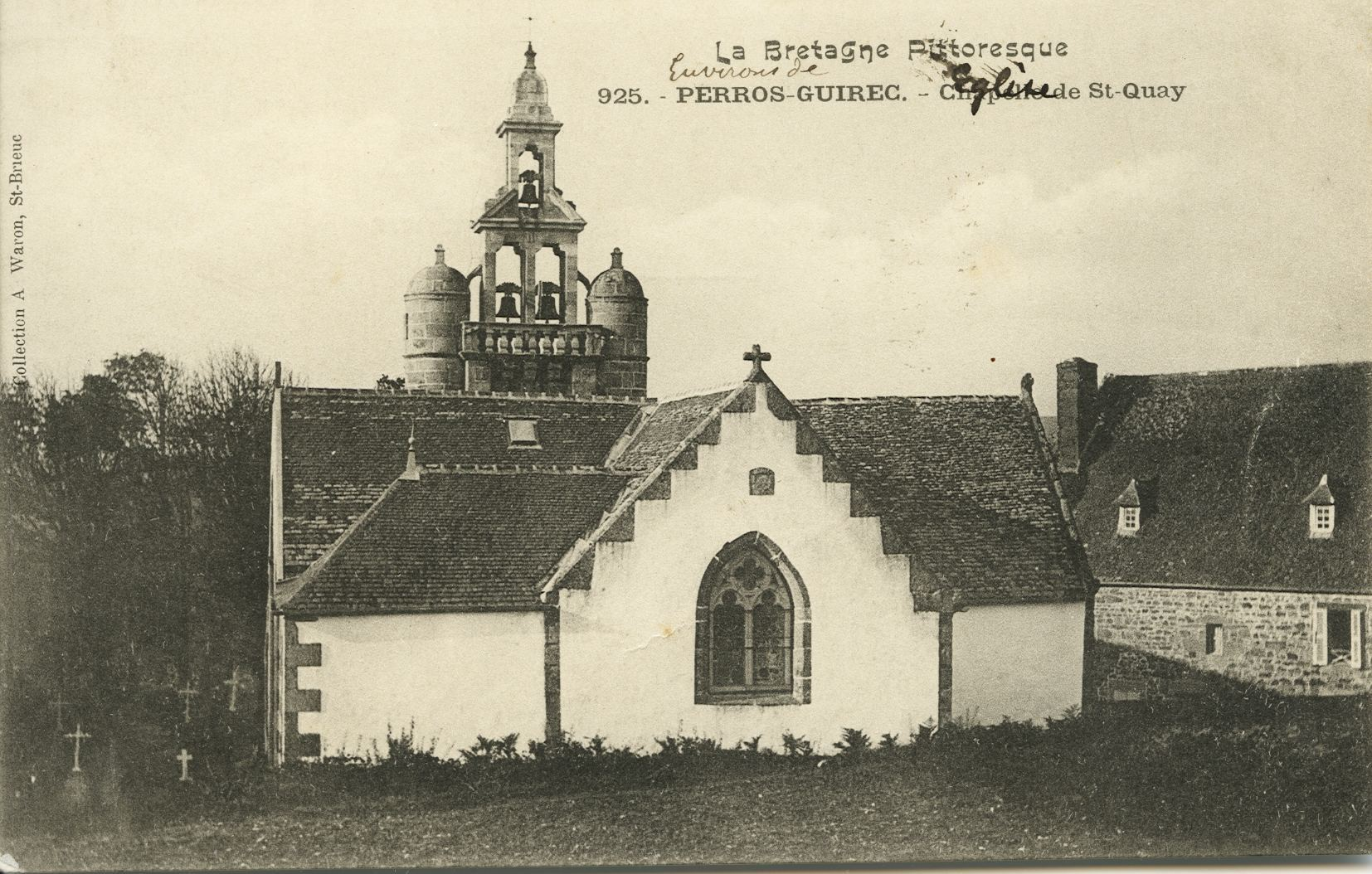
Saint Ke Church, Saint-Quay-Perros, Brittany

Saint Ke (or Kea) was a 5th-century saint born in Leuddiniawn (Lothian). He is said to be the son of King Leuddun of Lothian and that he served as a bishop in the Hen Ogledd before he moved to Wales and then to Cornwall. Later, he also travelled to Brittany. He is venerated in these locations. There is a 17th Century church of St Ke located in Saint-Quay-Perros, Brittany.

== Rheged ==
=== Saint Patrick ===
Saint Patrick lived in Britain in the 5th century. At the age of 16 he was kidnapped by Irish pirates and spent nearly 6 years in Ireland until he escaped and returned to Britain. Later, he became ordained and returned to Ireland, where it is believed that he performed numerous miracles, such as ridding the snakes from Ireland – though this is thought to be an allegory for the subduing of paganism on the island. In some traditions he was born in Glannoventa, modern day Ravenglass in Cumbria, which was then part of the kingdom of Rheged.

=== Saint Oswald and Saint Cuthbert ===
Although Saint Oswald and Saint Cuthbert are Anglian in origin, their names often appear in Old Welsh texts and may have been venerated by the Britons in the Hen Ogledd to an extent. Personal names found within the Hen Ogledd appear to reflect veneration of both Celtic and Anglian saints.

Saint Oswald (c. 604 – 642) and Saint Cuthbert (634/635 – 687) as elements of personal names are recorded in many texts originating in the Hen Ogledd with the element 'gos', meaning 'servant of'. Gospatrick, Gosmungo, Gososwald and Goscuthbert all appear as personal names in the 7th century. The form of 'gos' is unique to Cumbric.

In the White Book of Rhydderch there is a mention of a Gospatrick, in the Black Book of Carmarthen there is an alternate spelling, Gosparth.
