= Vâlcelele =

Vâlcelele may refer to several places in Romania:

- Vâlcelele, Buzău, a commune in Buzău County
- Vâlcelele, Călărași, a commune in Călărași County
- Vâlcelele, a village in Merișani Commune, Argeș County
- Vâlcelele, a village in Suplacu de Barcău Commune, Bihor County
- Vâlcelele, a village in Brăeşti Commune, Botoșani County
- Vâlcelele, a village in Bobâlna Commune, Cluj County
- Vâlcelele, a village in Vânătorii Mici Commune, Giurgiu County
- Vâlcelele, a village in Vlădeni Commune, Iași County
- Vâlcelele, a village in Colceag Commune, Prahova County
- Vâlcelele, a village in Stroiești Commune, Suceava County
- Vâlcelele, a village in Corbița Commune, Vrancea County
