= Île-Grande =

Island in Côtes-d'Armor, France

Native name: Enez-Veur
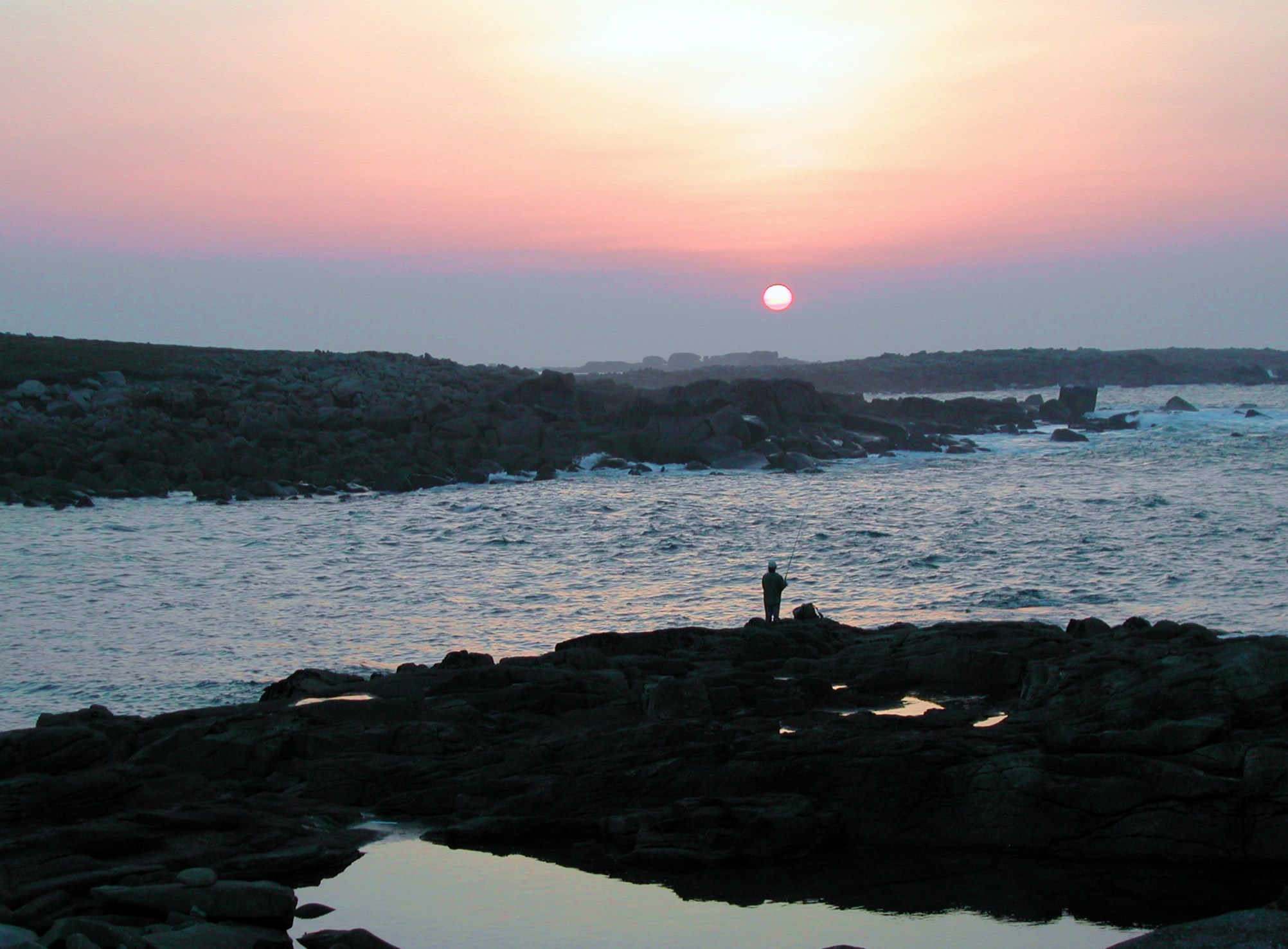
- Pointe de Toull-ar-Staon, on the north-west of the island

- Location within Côtes-d'Armor

Geography
- Location: English Channel
- Coordinates: 48.8013°N 3.575°W
- Length: 2 km (1.2 mi)
- Width: 1 km (0.6 mi)

Administration
- France
- Region: Brittany
- Department: Côtes-d'Armor
- Arrondissement: Lannion

Île-Grande (Enez-Veur in Breton) is an island on the north coast of Brittany (France), linked to the mainland by a road. Its size is about 2 km by 1 km, and there is a village on the island. It is in the commune of Pleumeur-Bodou (department of Côtes-d'Armor).

A smaller island, Île Aganton, is to the west, adjacent to Île-Grande. On the coast, Trébeurden lies to the south-west, and Trégastel to the east.

== Prehistory ==
In the centre of the island is a prehistoric site, an allée couverte (gallery grave). The site is known as Ty-Lia or Ty-ar-C'horrandoned. Constructed in Neolithic times, its size is about 9 metres by 1.5 metres; several upright stones support two large stone slabs.

== Literary associations ==
The writer Joseph Conrad stayed at a house in Île-Grande from 7 April to 14 August 1896, during his honeymoon. He worked there on his novel The Rescue. His short story "The Idiots" was set in the area, and includes many details observed during his stay there; granite-quarrying is mentioned, which was important for the island at that time.

== Gallery ==
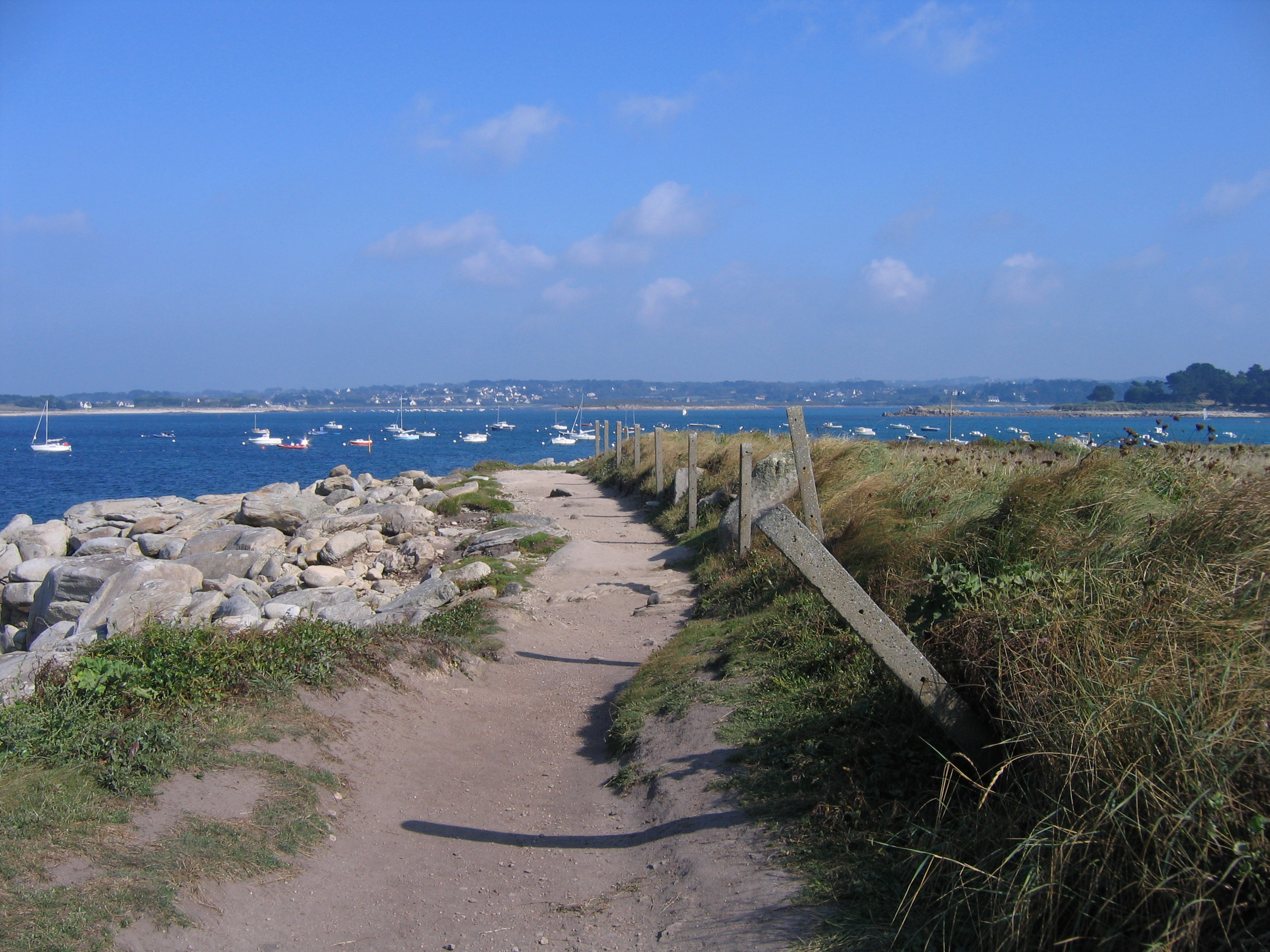
Porz Gelen, on the north-east of the island

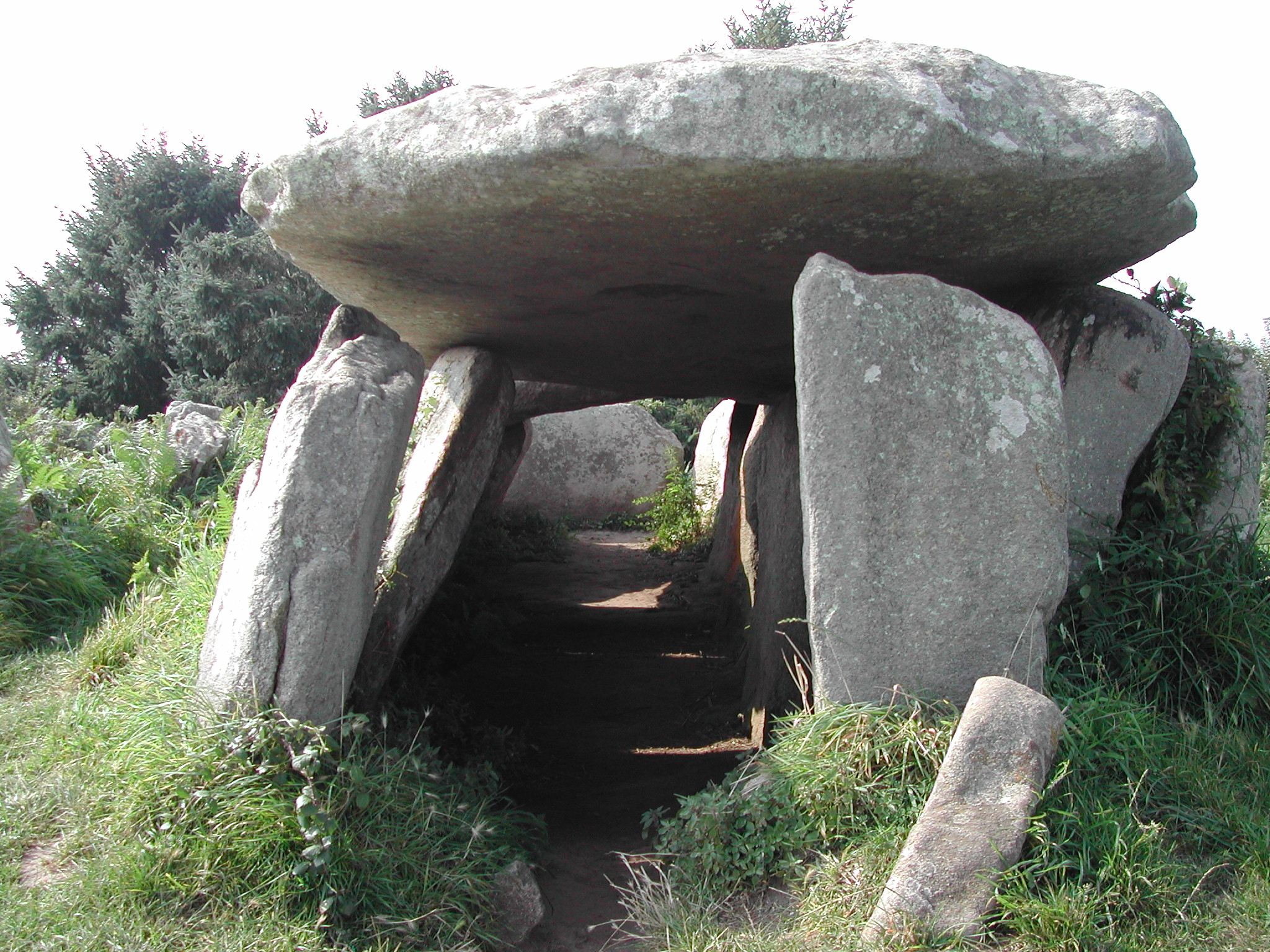
The gallery grave

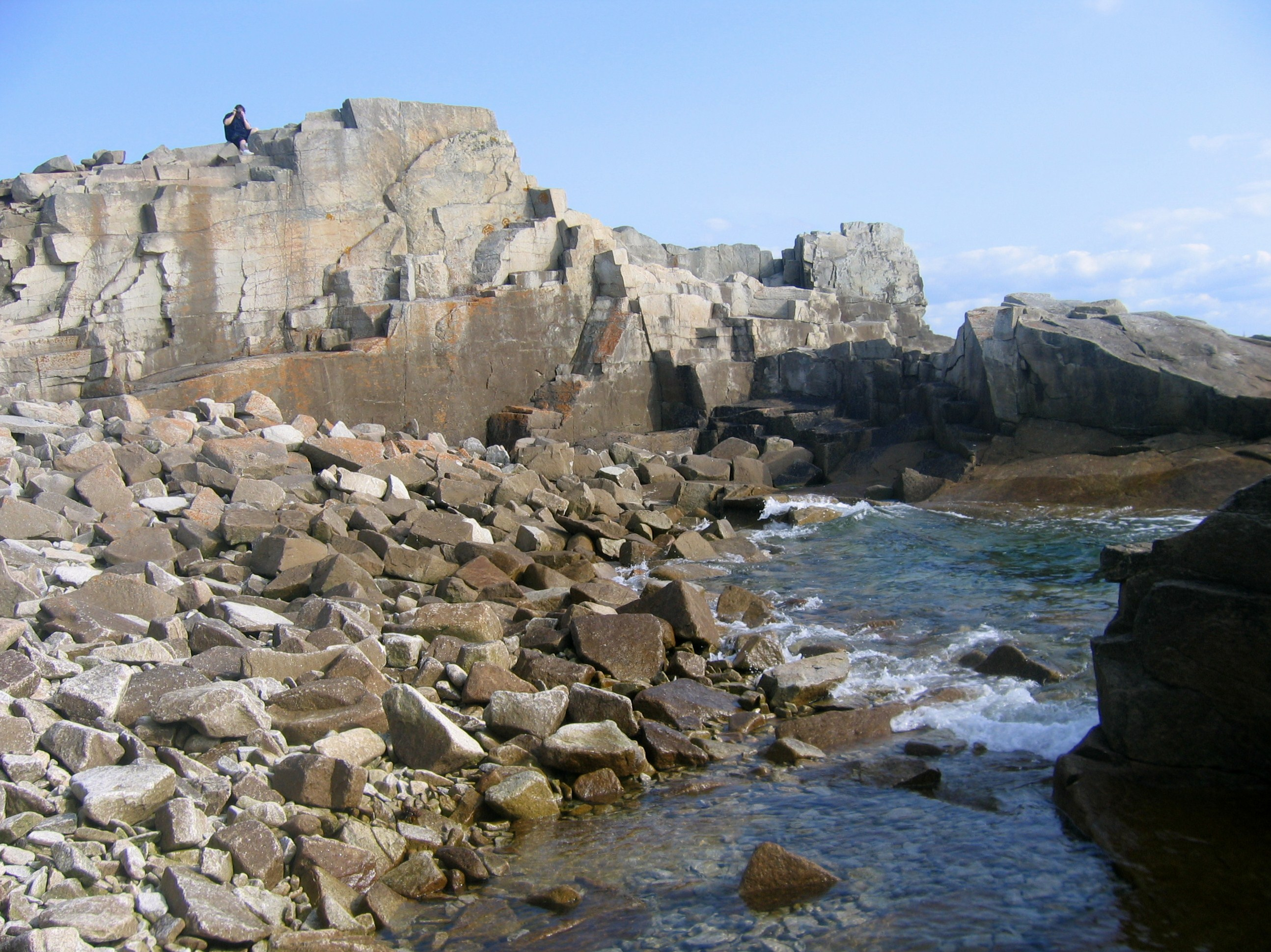
An old quarry

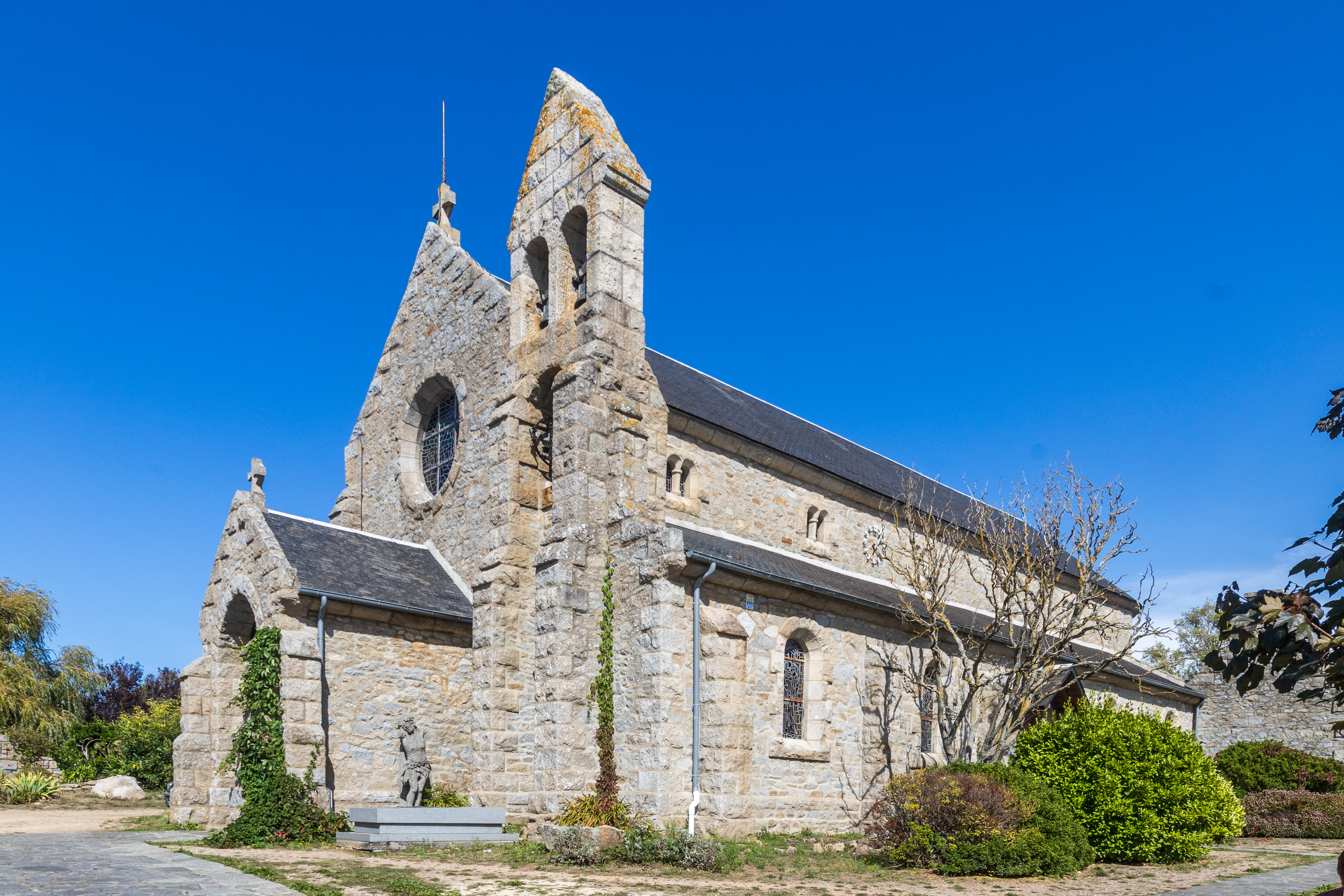
St Mark's Church

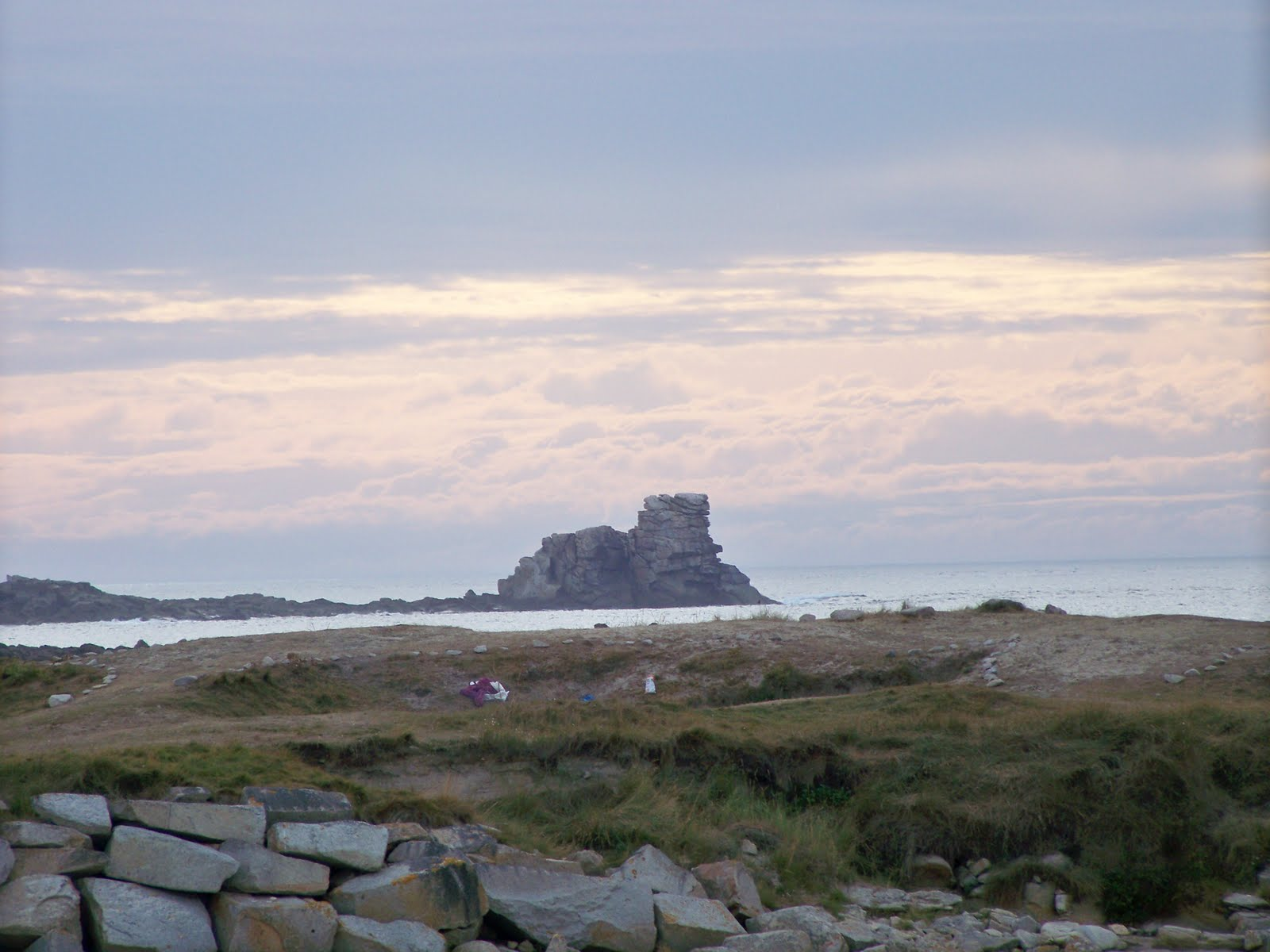
Le Corbeau, seen from the north of the island
