= Trélévern =

Trélévern Trelêvern
- Commune
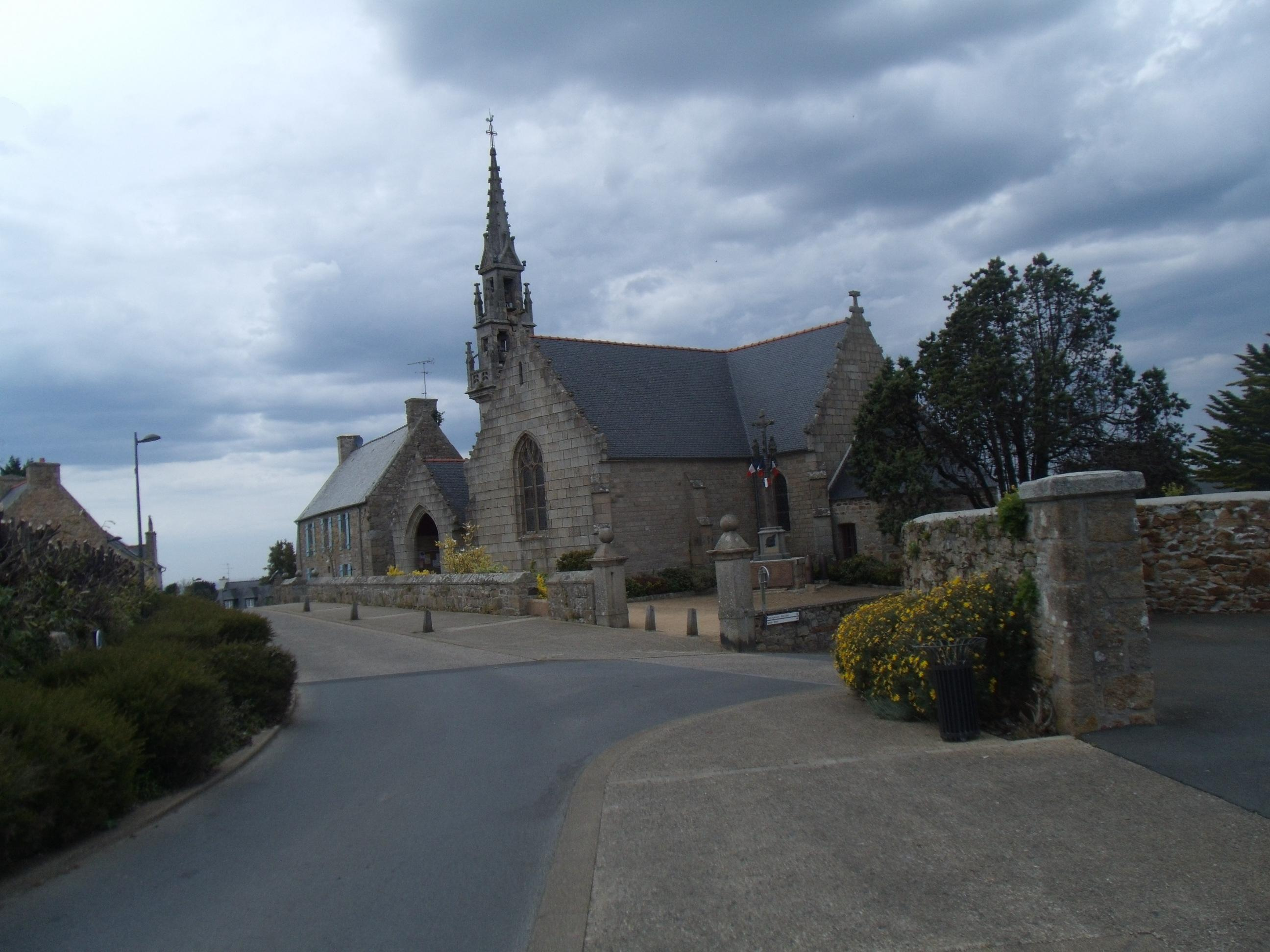
- The church of Saint-Léonore and Sainte-Anne

- Coat of arms
- Location of Trélévern
- Location within France Location within Brittany
- Coordinates: 48°48′33″N 3°22′14″W
- Country: France
- Region: Brittany
- Department: Côtes-d'Armor
- Arrondissement: Lannion
- Canton: Perros-Guirec
- Intercommunality: Lannion-Trégor Communauté

Government
  - Mayor (2023–2026): Yannick Quéguiner
- Area^{1}: 6.94 km^{2} (2.68 sq mi)
- Highest elevation: 92 m (302 ft)
- Lowest elevation: 0 m (0 ft)
- Population (2023): 1,245
  - Density: 179/km^{2} (465/sq mi)
- Time zone: UTC+01:00 (CET)
  - Summer (DST): UTC+02:00 (CEST)
- INSEE/Postal code: 22363 /22660
- ^{1} French Land Register data, which excludes lakes, ponds, glaciers > 1 km^{2} (0.386 sq mi or 247 acres) and river estuaries.

Trélévern (French pronunciation: [tʁelevɛʁn]; Breton: Trelêvern) is a commune in the Côtes-d'Armor department of Brittany in northwestern France located at the intersection of the touristic Côte de granit rose (pink granite Coast) and the quieter and wilder Côte des ajoncs d'or (golden gorses Coast).

== Population ==
Inhabitants of Trélévern are called trélévernais in French.

== See also ==
- Communes of the Côtes-d'Armor department
