= Canton of Perros-Guirec =

Coordinates: 48.81°N 3.45°W

The canton of Perros-Guirec is an administrative division of the Côtes-d'Armor department, northwestern France. Its borders were not modified at the French canton reorganisation which came into effect in March 2015. Its seat is in Perros-Guirec.

It consists of the following communes:

1. Kermaria-Sulard
2. Louannec
3. Perros-Guirec
4. Pleumeur-Bodou
5. Saint-Quay-Perros
6. Trébeurden
7. Trégastel
8. Trélévern
9. Trévou-Tréguignec
