= Kermaria-Sulard =

Kermaria-Sulard Kervaria-Sular
- Commune
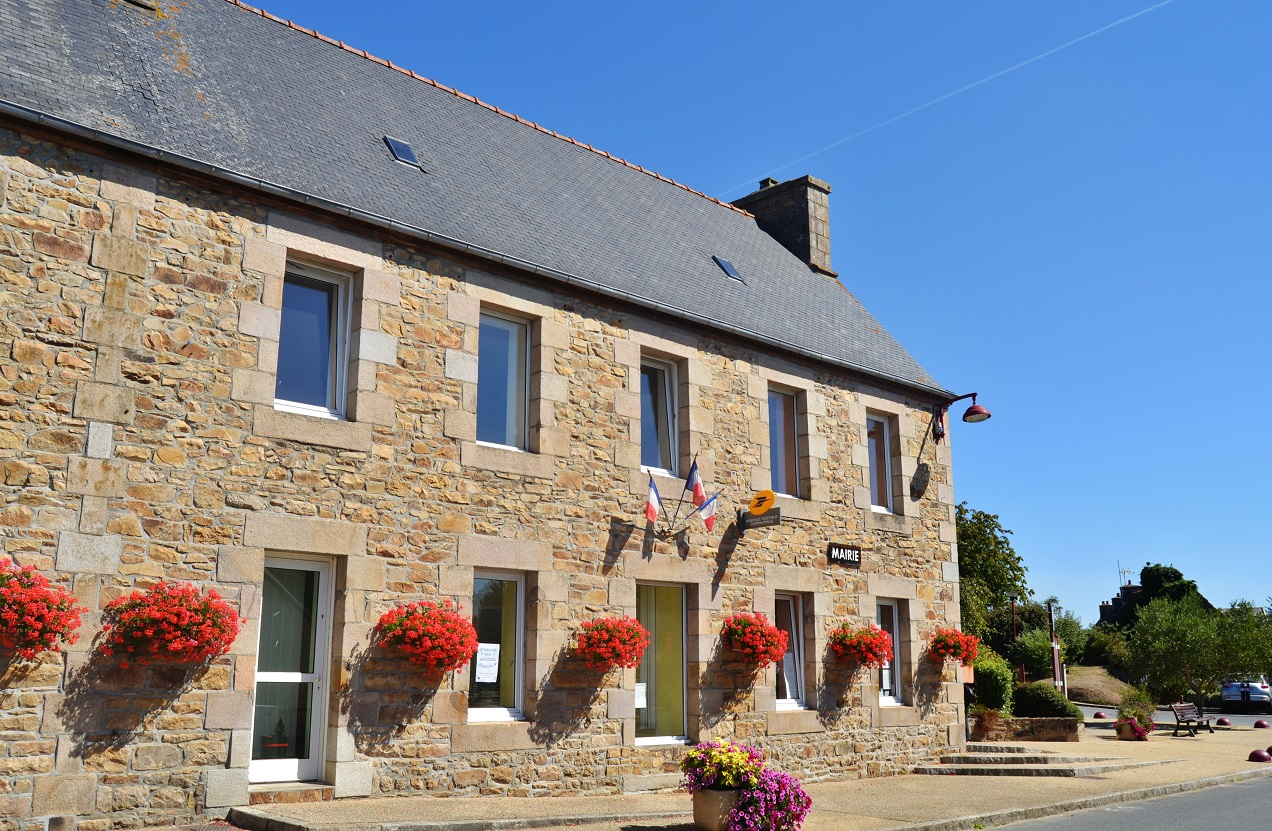
- The town hall of Kermaria-Sulard

- Coat of arms
- Location of Kermaria-Sulard
- Location within France Location within Brittany
- Coordinates: 48°46′21″N 3°22′10″W
- Country: France
- Region: Brittany
- Department: Côtes-d'Armor
- Arrondissement: Lannion
- Canton: Perros-Guirec
- Intercommunality: Lannion-Trégor Communauté

Government
  - Mayor (2024–2026): Pierre Houssais
- Area^{1}: 9.02 km^{2} (3.48 sq mi)
- Highest elevation: 110 m (360 ft)
- Lowest elevation: 55 m (180 ft)
- Population (2023): 1,112
  - Density: 123/km^{2} (319/sq mi)
- Time zone: UTC+01:00 (CET)
  - Summer (DST): UTC+02:00 (CEST)
- INSEE/Postal code: 22090 /22450
- ^{1} French Land Register data, which excludes lakes, ponds, glaciers > 1 km^{2} (0.386 sq mi or 247 acres) and river estuaries.

Kermaria-Sulard (French pronunciation: [kɛʁmaʁja sylaʁ]; Breton: Kervaria-Sular) is a commune in the Côtes-d'Armor department of Brittany in northwestern France.

== Population ==
Historical population
Year	Pop.	±% p.a.
1968	478	—
1975	460	−0.55%
1982	632	+4.64%
1990	648	+0.31%
1999	745	+1.56%
2007	935	+2.88%
2012	989	+1.13%
2017	1,049	+1.18%
2023	1,112	+0.98%
Source: INSEE

Inhabitants of Kermaria-Sulard are called kermarianais in French.

== Sister city ==
- Muhlbach-sur-Munster, France

== See also ==
- Communes of the Côtes-d'Armor department
