= Muhlbach-sur-Munster =

Commune in Grand Est, France

Muhlbach-sur-Munster Mühlbach
- Commune
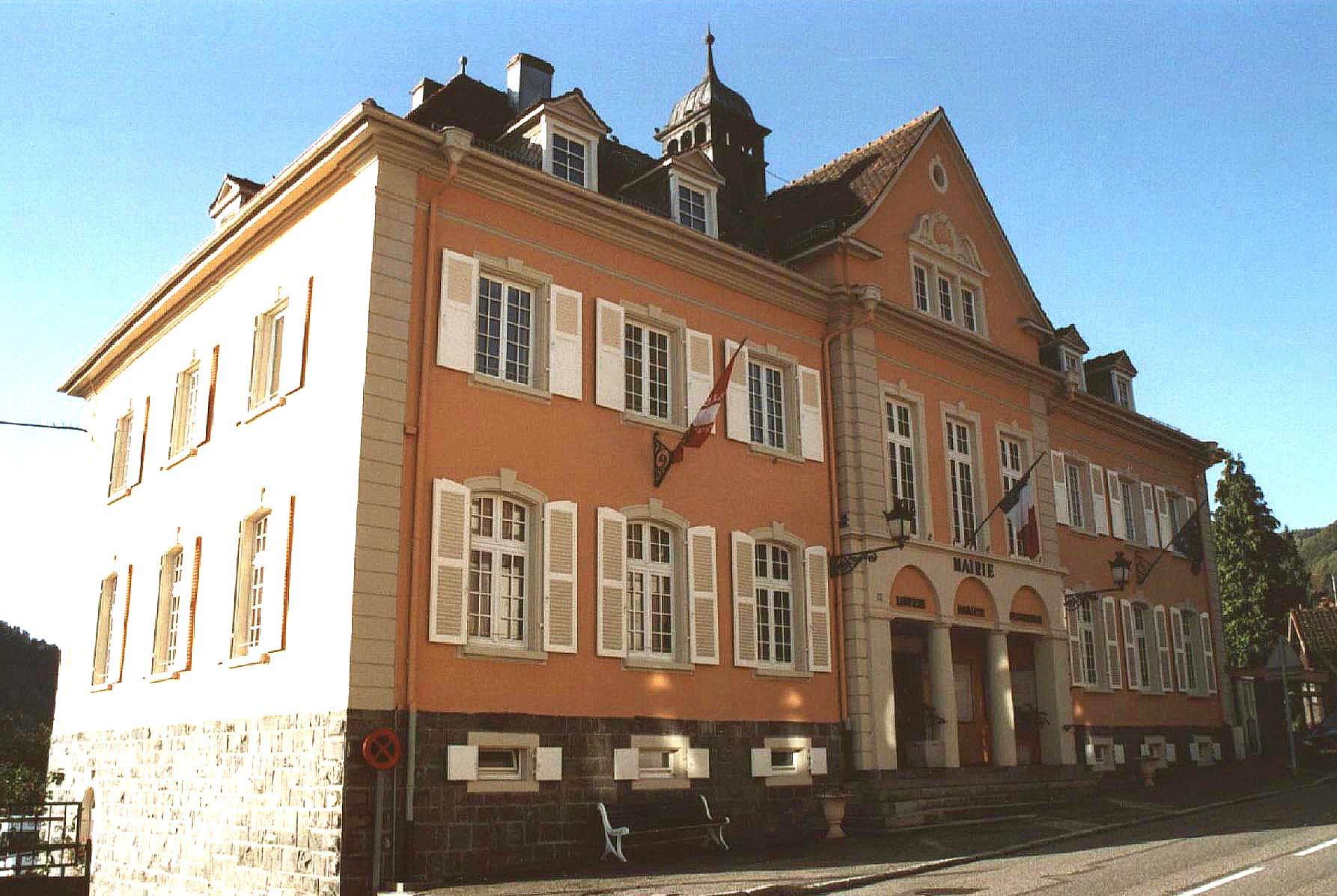
- The town hall in Muhlbach

- Coat of arms
- Location of Muhlbach-sur-Munster
- Location within France Location within Grand Est
- Coordinates: 48°01′35″N 7°05′03″E
- Country: France
- Region: Grand Est
- Department: Haut-Rhin
- Arrondissement: Colmar-Ribeauvillé
- Canton: Wintzenheim
- Intercommunality: Vallée de Munster

Government
  - Mayor (2020–2026): Patrick Althusser
- Area^{1}: 7.88 km^{2} (3.04 sq mi)
- Elevation: 466 m (1,529 ft)
- Highest elevation: 1,283 m (4,209 ft)
- Lowest elevation: 436 m (1,430 ft)
- Population (2023): 818
  - Density: 104/km^{2} (269/sq mi)
- Time zone: UTC+01:00 (CET)
  - Summer (DST): UTC+02:00 (CEST)
- INSEE/Postal code: 68223 /68380
- ^{1} French Land Register data, which excludes lakes, ponds, glaciers > 1 km^{2} (0.386 sq mi or 247 acres) and river estuaries.

Muhlbach-sur-Munster (German: Mühlbach im Elsass) is a commune in the Haut-Rhin department in Grand Est in north-eastern France. It is the birthplace of the German publisher Johann Carolus, founder of the earliest known newspaper in 1605.

== People ==
- Johann Carolus (1575–1634), German printer

== Sister city ==
- Kermaria-Sulard, France

== See also ==
- Communes of the Haut-Rhin département
