= Trévou-Tréguignec =

Trévou-Tréguignec An Trevoù
- Commune
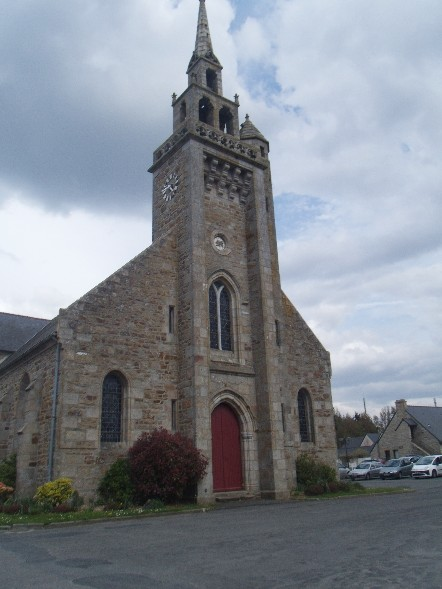
- The church of Saint-Samson

- Coat of arms
- Location of Trévou-Tréguignec
- Location within France Location within Brittany
- Coordinates: 48°48′56″N 3°21′26″W
- Country: France
- Region: Brittany
- Department: Côtes-d'Armor
- Arrondissement: Lannion
- Canton: Perros-Guirec
- Intercommunality: Lannion-Trégor Communauté

Government
  - Mayor (2020–2026): Pierre Adam
- Area^{1}: 6.52 km^{2} (2.52 sq mi)
- Highest elevation: 92 m (302 ft)
- Lowest elevation: 0 m (0 ft)
- Population (2023): 1,603
  - Density: 246/km^{2} (637/sq mi)
- Time zone: UTC+01:00 (CET)
  - Summer (DST): UTC+02:00 (CEST)
- INSEE/Postal code: 22379 /22660
- ^{1} French Land Register data, which excludes lakes, ponds, glaciers > 1 km^{2} (0.386 sq mi or 247 acres) and river estuaries.

Trévou-Tréguignec (French pronunciation: [tʁevu tʁegiɲɛk]; Breton: An Trevoù) is a commune in the Côtes-d'Armor department of Brittany in northwestern France.

== Population ==
Inhabitants of Trévou-Tréguignec are called Trévousiens in French.

== Geography ==
The commune of Trévou-Tréguignec (Breton language, Trev, "a small plot of land" and Tréguignec, "locality") is located in a valley that ends at the long beach of Trestel with its pristine white sand. On the west is the village of Trévou and on the eastern shore stands Tréguignec. In the valley we find the Chateau of Boisriou surrounded by many ponds and a forest. The coastline has a varied terrain with unusual rock formations. The shore extends from the port of Le Groff adjoining the commune of Trélévern, to Port-du-Royau, near the dunes of Port-Blanc.

Trévou-Tréguignec has two beaches, Royau and Trestel (Breton traezh, fine sand). Trestel attracts many summer visitors and flew the European Blue flag (indicating environmental quality) from 1998 to 2004. There is also a Thalassotherapy center. Another small beach is nicknamed "Cabbage Beach" because of the Sea kale growing on the shingle.

Trestel is a popular area for windsurfing. It hosted the French funboard championship in October–November 1990.

=== Details ===
The coast at Trévou-Tréguignec has many environmentally sensitive areas, described by Professor Jean-Pierre Pinot in his book Coastal Zone Management. Pinot studied the "comet tails" characteristic of the coast in this area: a comet tail is an accumulation of sediment in a sheltered position behind a reef or small island.

Trestel's marsh represents another unusual habitat, and was the subject of a research project by Mohammed Alhassan commissioned by the legislative Assembly of Côtes-d'Armor: Trestel Marsh, an unusual habitat - Contribution to an environmental review and enhancement project by means of the establishment of walking paths (2002–2004). The marshes were also studied as part of the Natura 2000 project (identifying local habitats worthy of preservation).

To the west of Trestel beach, a geological formation characteristic of the area is visible: a vein of dolerite.

== History ==
=== Fire at Castle Boisriou ===
On Christmas Eve 1713, Margaret Goff, servant at Boisriou Castle, lighting her way with a torch (in the absence of her employers, who had prohibited their use) set fire to a new building on the property. The flames caused extensive damage.

=== Count of Trévou imprisoned in Castle Taurus ===
In 1902, Prosper Hemon published a brochure on Count Sebastian Trévou, a naval lieutenant, commander of the corvette "Le Papillon" in 1787-1788. A confrontation between the Count and his crew resulted in his imprisonment in the chateau de Taureau, from which he attempted to escape. His body was found smashed on the rocks of Plougasnou.

=== Bishop of Tréguier takes refuge in castle ===
Auguste-Louis-Marie Le Mintier Sévignac was born on 28 December 1728. Pronounced Doctor of theology in 1757, he was vicar at St. Brieuc from 1766 to 1769, then in Rennes from 1769 to 1786, He became the last bishop of Tréguier in 1786. In Morlaix, on 14 September 1789, he published a proclamation which the revolutionary government considered reactionary. He also took a stand against the law on the Civil Constitution of the Clergy subordinating the church to the government, and was forced to flee the country. In February 1791, he took refuge in the chateau of Boisriou in Trévou-Tréguignec, before embarking on a fishing boat to the island of Jersey. He died in London at the home of Madame de Catuélan-Le Merdy, on 21 January 1801.

=== Reassigned to Perros-Guirec ===
By a royal decree issued on 23 June 1842, Trévou-Tréguignec was reassigned to the district of Perros-Guirec and thus removed from that of Trélévern.

=== Trestel in the 1900s ===
In the early 20th century, the beach of Trestel was transformed by the construction of numerous hotels and villas.

The opening of the Grand Hôtel Casino de la Mer, on 7 August 1910, was commemorated in a series of postcards designed by Eugene Lageat. That day, a crowd on Trestel beach witnessed or participated in a variety of entertainments, including bicycle races, a slippery pole contest, fireworks and dances. This hotel, sometimes called Hôtel Thomas, Hôtel Kermor or Grand café de la Mer, was torn down in the 1950s to permit the expansion of a tuberculosis clinic.

The imposing "villa Postel", built facing the Royau beach, was occupied by the Germans during the Second World War, and was destroyed before their departure.

The Grand Hôtel des Flots, originally operated by the Feuillet family, was acquired by the city of Vincennes and used as a summer camp for many years.

The Grand Hôtel de la Plage, operated by the Nédélec family, was torn down recently to permit construction of a new rehabilitation center for marine environmental studies. The tuberculosis clinic was originally based in this hotel in 1921.

=== Trévou church fire ===
On the night of 7 September 1914 the Saint-Samson church, built in 1848, was destroyed by lightning. Benjamin Jolly had written about this church in 1856:

The church is a fine Gothic building, constructed in our time financed by the spontaneous contributions of the poor residents of this little parish. The time had come to replace the former church, a sort of dark crypt with cracked walls. Everything is perfect harmony in the new church, whose unusual transept is illuminated by two flamboyant stained glass windows. The portal to the tower's eastern side is remarkable for its height, depth and the detail of its moldings. Inside, one admires the high altar, including a cabinet whose panels, adorned with little steeples, include images of Christ and the Evangelists. The shelf at the back of the altar is no less remarkable for its canopy, its friezes and Gothic spandrels. It rises gracefully to the height of the wainscot, without blocking the stained glass window. Finally the pulpit, pews, catafalque, and railings, are all worthy of attention.

On 16 March 1924 the cornerstone of the new church received its blessing. On 14 March 1926 the new church of St. Samson was consecrated. The Trévou-Tréguignec Parish, surrounded by the diocese of Tréguier, formed part of the deanery of Lannion, under the bishopric of Dol de Bretagne, and was under the patronage of St. Samson.

=== Trestel Tuberculosis Clinic ===
On 24 December 1921, the tuberculosis clinic opened, utilising space in a hotel. It was founded by "The Organization for Salt Water Treatment of Tuberculosis and Related Afflictions".

On 20 April 1929 the construction, which had begun in 1924, was completed on the clinic's new home.

The clinic's September 1929 brochure states:

Children of both sexes are admitted, aged 3-17 years, suffering from tubercular lesions of the bones, joints, and lymph nodes (but no pulmonary lesions). On the roof of the clinic is a large terrace overlooking the whole area and the beach. It is used for cures based on complete exposure to sunshine, and for physical fitness exercises. The old clinic (the former hotel) now serves as a leprosy clinic. The facility is also provided with a storehouse, a pigpen, a henhouse, etc. .. A large stretch of farmland supplies fresh vegetables. A dedicated water-main drawing on underground resources brings water as high as the terrace. Construction of the building is entirely in reinforced concrete. Classes for the children take place outdoors in good weather, and in bad weather are held in a large, well-aired classroom, with bay windows opening onto the sea.

The clinic continued to specialize in tuberculosis until the mid-1950s, when it began to take on other functions as well.

The Henri-Avril scholastic group took over operations on 5 November 1950.

In 1957, the clinic was renamed the Centre Helio-Marin. It began to focus on the physical rehabilitation of patients, with the construction of a pool of heated seawater.

In 1968, the center became part of the Centre Hospitalier de Saint-Brieuc, and began to specialize in adult rehabilitation.

On 1 January 1989 the center became part of the Centre Hospitalier Pierre Le Damany of Lannion.

The center has more recently been recharacterized as the "Center for Salt Water Rehabilitation". In 1995, the facade overlooking Trestel beach was remodeled. The center today has a completely modernised medical service and support.

=== Cinema Charlot ===
Charles Le Carvennec, known as "Charlot", began his working life as a carpenter. The economic crisis of the 1930s, and the corresponding unemployment, forced him to change careers. Tn 1933, he decided to open a small tavern near Trestel beach. The following year, he added a dance floor. Soon after, a team of projectionists employed by a large German firm arrived for a showing of Children of Paradise. Charlot decided to purchase a projector (utilizing Pathé Nathan 17.5 mm film, the then-popular format). Thus began 30 years of outdoor cinema in the area. After the Liberation, Charlot exchanged his old unit for a 16 mm "Debrie" projector. Until 1969, he continued to show movies which would later become classics of the cinema, in various outdoor locations in the countryside.

== Administration ==
List of successive mayors
| Period from - to | Identity |
|---|---|
| 1947 to 1965 | Henry Boisriou |
| 1965 to 1971 | Robert Tourneux |
| 1971 to 1976 | Henry Boisriou |
| 1976 to 1977 | Louis Le Roy |
| 1977 to 1990 | Yves de Boisriou |
| 1990 to 1997 | Herve de Boisriou |
| 1997 to 2001 | Paul Zampese |
| 2001 to 2008 | Marie-Louise The Morzadec |
| 2008 to 2014 | Alain Ernot |
| 2014 to 2026 | Pierre Adam |

== Personalities ==
- Jean-Mordreuc was born in Trévou Tréguignec in 1908. He later lived in Ploumanac'h, and then in Pleudihen, near Dinan. Under the name "Jean Pepin", he was the author of four novels: "The Return" ("An Distro")(1956), "The Charnel House" (1957), "Wrecks" (1958) and "The Conviction" (1961).
- Eugene Lageat, photographer and postcard publisher
- Lucien-Marie Le Gardien, painter
- Joseph Le Gorrec, who died in Lannion in 1926 after being hit by a car, was known under the name "Canaan" or "Kanamm" (see the postcards of Eugène Lageat). He was a well known local deaf mute supported by public charity, and whose nickname was inspired by his distinctive way of growling. Edward Ollivro devoted a chapter of his novel "Picou son of his father" to him. He is also mentioned in "Sophie Tréguier", e novel by Henri Pollès.
- Gustave Prigent, known as "Dall an Treou", was a blind fiddler who died in 1940. He lived in the village of Trévou and performed at dances and weddings. He often played the violin near his home, sitting at the foot of the Calvary monument, or at the entrance to the beach. He lived primarily on charity.

== Sights ==
=== Coat-Mez dolmen ===
The Coat-Mez farm, near the Chateau of Boisriou, has the ruins of a type of dolmen (prehistoric stone formation) known as a "covered walkway".

=== Trestel Beach ===
Just off Trestel Beach are the underwater remains of a former forest. Benjamin Jolivet explained that the beach was once planted with tall trees. "Everywhere, in fact, at very shallow depths (60 to 80 centimeters) are found trunks of alders or oaks that people exploit and sell. Every day, an unfortunate population, pick in hand, searches the beach in every direction, sometimes finding fragments, sometimes whole trees. Grasslands adjoining the beach and which most likely adjoined this wood or forest, were called Pen-ar-Guern, Breton words meaning "beginning of an alder forest". Everything confirms the existence of an ancient forest, where the sea now reigns supreme."

=== Baloré Manor(15th - 16th centuries) ===
Baloré Manor was originally the stronghold of the lords of the same name whose coat of arms was "De sable à un château d'or, sommé de trois tourillons de même" (Le Borgne, armorial, 1667). This family derived from that of Trévou, lords of the neighboring manor Trévou Bras. Their coat of arms was "«D'argent au léopard de sable, accompagné de six merlettes du même posées en orle ». The family motto is "Pa garro Doué" (" When God pleases "). The family had several notable members:

- In 1418, Yves Trévou accompanied the Duke of Brittany on his trip to France.
- In 1477, Olivier married Guillemette de Quelen.
- In 1629, Jean du Trévou, was named adviser to the king, and Seneschal of Lannion.
- In 1642, his son, René du Trévou, was named Lieutenant General of the Admiralty, based in Lannion.
- In 1670, Pere du Trévou, a Jesuit, was confessor to Monsieur, the brother of Louis XIV.
- In 1689, a member of the family served as page to the King.
- In 1753, another member of the family served as lieutenant in the French guard.
- In 1758, Joseph du Trévou fought at Saint-Cast.
- Two members of the family were naval lieutenants involved in the American Revolution: one on the "Valiant" and the other on the "Jason".
- Sebastian du Trévou was commander of "Le Papillon".
- The family moved to the chateau Trévou Traofeunteuniou at Ploujean in 1755, when it sold the manor of Baloré. The manor was acquired by Mr. Louis Pasquiou, royal notary at Kergouanton, who lived in the Trélévern mansion nearby. The manor has since remained in the same family.
- In 1795, a member of the family, serving as lieutenant, was shot to death at Quiberon.

Note: Baloré manor once had its own chapel, named St. Thérézien. In 1389, the pope issued a bull, granting an indulgence to anyone who helped in the restoration of the chapel, damaged by war.

The silhouette of this manor was long well-known to schoolchildren. Several editions of geography textbooks by Schrader and Gallouedec had an engraving of the mansion with the caption: A Farm in Brittany. Gallouedec's "Brittany" included the same illustration with a more accurate caption: "Trévoux manor".

The manor includes a large granite gateway, adjacent to a massive vault of a gray color. Nearby are other arches and another large gateway is the entrance to the courtyard near the well. The buildings are constructed at right angles, with a square central tower, which houses a spiral staircase accessing the various rooms of the mansion. A very old statue of St. Ives once adorned the entrance hall. From time immemorial, the lease stipulated that a candle was to be lighted in front of this "protector of the place," on May 19, his birthday. The interiors are simple, with a granite fireplace in almost every room.

Behind the mansion, in a garden surrounded by a wall built in 1819, stands a dovecote which dates back to the original owners. Nearby, there is a base on which stood a sundial from the eighteenth century, which has since disappeared. This dial bore the sad inscription: sicut FUGIUNT Horo SIC VITA MEA FUGIT ("As the hours flee, so flees our life").

=== Boisriou Chateau ===
In the fifteenth century, his manor belonged to Francis de Carnavalet, the Seigneur of Bois-Riou, in Trévou-Tréguignec. He became well known at the court of Henry II and of his sons, of whom he was the tutor. He was a Knight of the Order, Grand Equerry of France, Lieutenant of the company of men at arms of Henry III, Governor of Anjou, of Bourbonnais and Foretz. The Carnavalet family of Bois-Riou provided one of four lieutenants of Louis XIV's guards. The family coat of arms displayed "argent à trois faces, accompagné de dix merlettes, le tout de sable."

In 1421, Marie de Boisriou, upon her marriage, brought the chateau into the Plusquellec family.

In the sixteenth century, the castle of Bois Riou descended to Madame de Villeneuve Louet, who was, as a result of this holding, recognized as a founder of the parish in the census of 1695.

The chateau also gave its name to the family of Le Borgne Boisriou. This family was descended from a brother of Guy Le Borgne, the author of the Armorial de Bretagne (1667). The family took title to the chateau after a wedding in 1677 and has held it ever since.

=== Chapel of St. Guénolé ===
The Chapel of St. Guénolé is located in Tréguignec. It was built in the nineteenth century on the foundations of an existing building. It contains tinted wood statues of the Madonna with child (late fifteenth century), St. Barbara (sixteenth century), St. Marguerite (sixteenth century) and a Crucifixion (late fifteenth-early sixteenth century).

== See also ==
- Communes of the Côtes-d'Armor department
- The Calvary at Kergrist-Moëlou
