= Île Milliau =

Island in Côtes-d'Armor, France

Native name: Enez Miliev
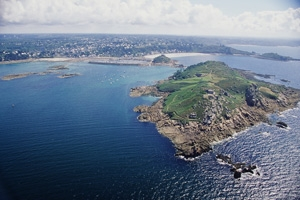
- Île Milliau, and Trébeurden beyond

- Location within Côtes-d'Armor

Geography
- Location: English Channel
- Coordinates: 48°46′09″N 3°35′49″W
- Area: 23 ha (57 acres)
- Length: 1 km (0.6 mi)

Administration
- France
- Region: Brittany
- Department: Côtes-d'Armor
- Arrondissement: Lannion

Île Milliau (Enez Miliev in Breton) is an island on the coast of Brittany, France, in the commune of Trébeurden (department of Côtes-d'Armor). It is the property of the Conservatoire du littoral. It is a short distance west of the port of Trébeurden, and is accessible on foot at low tide. Its length is about 1 kilometre (0.62 mi) and is about 23 hectares (57 acres) in area. There is moorland, with ferns and maritime shrubs.

== Prehistory ==
On the island is a prehistoric site, an allée couverte (gallery grave), known as Ty Liac'h, built in the Neolithic period. It is in the central part of the ridge of the island. There are ten upright stones, supporting three horizontal slabs. There are other stones on the ground which once were supporting stones; there was at least one other horizontal slab. The original length was 14–19 metres (46–62 ft), and it had a lateral entrance on the north side.

It is south of an adjacent field in which, from aerial photographs, traces have been detected of about twenty prehistoric circular huts.

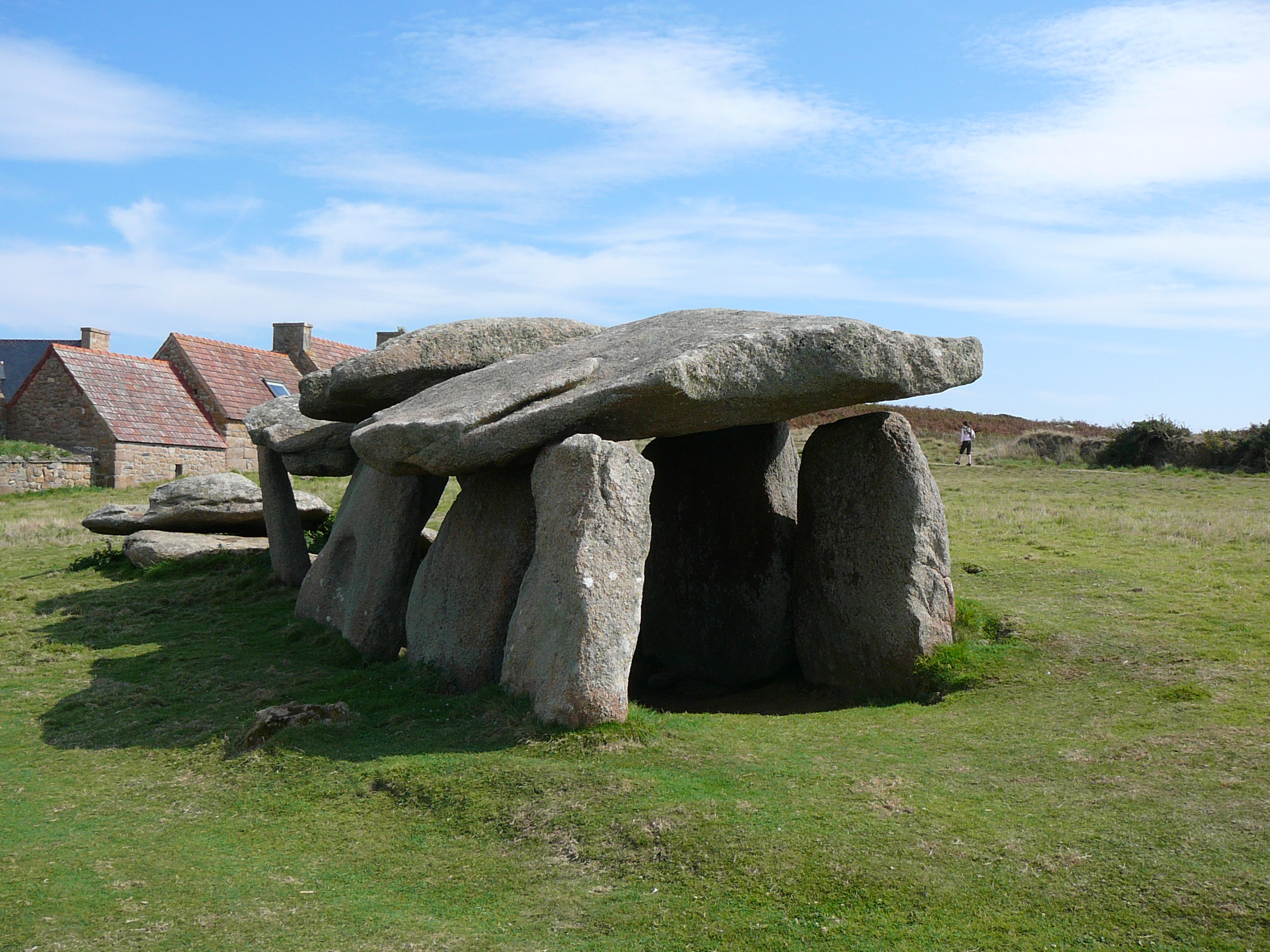
The gallery grave

== History ==
It is thought that St Miliau, in the 6th century, stayed here; he evangelized the local area, and founded the parish of Ploumilliau.

There is a farmhouse on the island (now converted into a gîte), of which the earliest parts date from medieval times. In the north-eastern gable-end is a relatively well-preserved medieval monastic cell. It measures 3.5 metres (11 ft) by 4.5 metres (15 ft) and its height is 2 metres (6.6 ft). The interior is formed with slabs about 0.5 metres (1.6 ft) wide.

=== Maison Aristide Briand ===
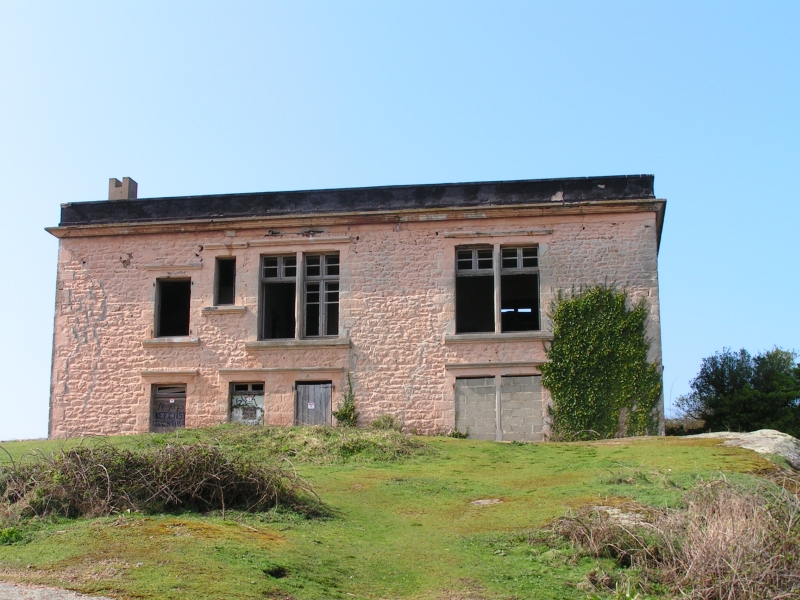
Maison Aristide Briand in 2007

Mademoiselle Uro-Lalès, also known as Lucie Jourdan (1883–1957), bought the island from Count Anatole James in 1911. It remained her property until 1942. In 1920 she had a villa built here; she was the mistress of the politician Aristide Briand, and the villa was known as Maison Aristide Briand. During the Second World War, the building was occupied by German soldiers. In more recent years it became derelict, and it was demolished in 2009.
