= Saint-Quay-Perros =

Saint-Quay-Perros Sant-Ke-Perroz
- Commune
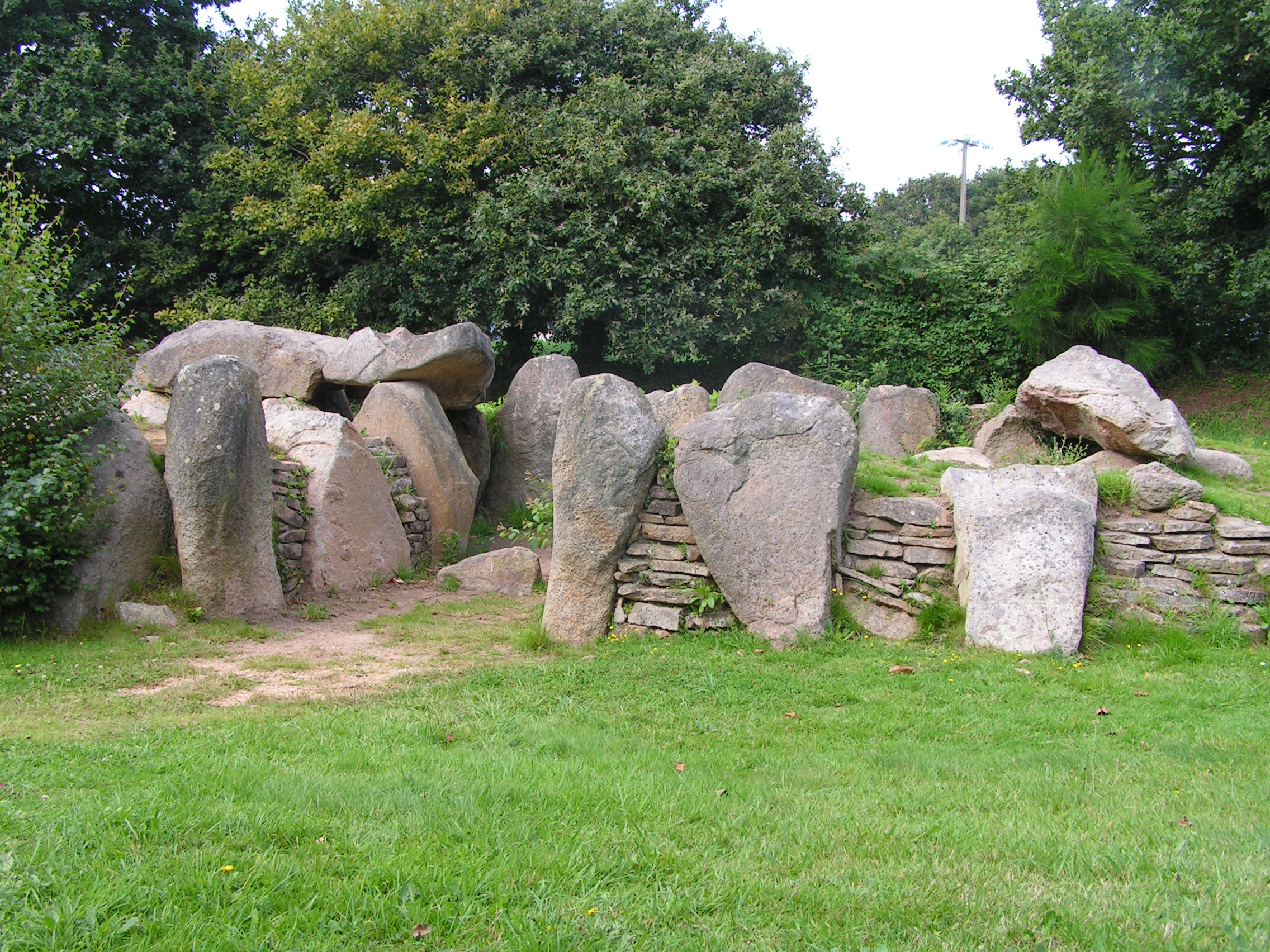
- Covered walkway
- Location of Saint-Quay-Perros
- Location within France Location within Brittany
- Coordinates: 48°47′36″N 3°26′47″W
- Country: France
- Region: Brittany
- Department: Côtes-d'Armor
- Arrondissement: Lannion
- Canton: Perros-Guirec
- Intercommunality: Lannion-Trégor Communauté

Government
  - Mayor (2020–2026): Olivier Houzet
- Area^{1}: 4.72 km^{2} (1.82 sq mi)
- Highest elevation: 96 m (315 ft)
- Lowest elevation: 4 m (13 ft)
- Population (2023): 1,308
  - Density: 277/km^{2} (718/sq mi)
- Time zone: UTC+01:00 (CET)
  - Summer (DST): UTC+02:00 (CEST)
- INSEE/Postal code: 22324 /22700
- ^{1} French Land Register data, which excludes lakes, ponds, glaciers > 1 km^{2} (0.386 sq mi or 247 acres) and river estuaries.

Saint-Quay-Perros (French pronunciation: [sɛ̃ kɛ pɛʁɔs]; Breton: Sant-Ke-Perroz) is a commune in the Côtes-d'Armor department of Brittany in northwestern France.

== Population ==
Inhabitants of Saint-Quay-Perros are called kénanais in French.

== See also ==
- Communes of the Côtes-d'Armor department
