= Ingram Island =

Island in Queensland

- Interactive map of Ingram Island

Geography
- Coordinates: 14.417°S 144.880°E

Administration
- Australia
- State: Queensland
- City: Helensvale

Ingram Island is part of the Great Barrier Reef Marine Park in the Howick Group National Park and is about 100 km south-east of Cape Melville, Queensland.

The island is north-west of Howick Island in Helensvale. Its nearby cities are Cairns, Port Moresby, Merauke Sea turtles frequent this area and there is also a cruise ship anchorage.
