= Villanuova sul Clisi =

- Comune
- Comune di Villanuova sul Clisi
- Location within Italy Location within Lombardy
- Coordinates: 45°36′N 10°27′E
- Country: Italy
- Region: Lombardy
- Province: Brescia (BS)
- Frazioni: Berniga, Bondone, Bostone, Canneto, Mezzane, Peracque, Ponte Pier, Valverde

Area
  - Total: 9 km^{2} (3.5 sq mi)
- Elevation: 216 m (709 ft)

Population (2011)
  - Total: 5,837
  - Density: 650/km^{2} (1,700/sq mi)
- Demonym: Villanovesi
- Time zone: UTC+1 (CET)
  - Summer (DST): UTC+2 (CEST)
- Postal code: 25089
- Dialing code: 0365
- ISTAT code: 017201
- Patron saint: Saint Matteo
- Saint day: 21 September
- Website: Official website

Villanuova sul Clisi (Brescian: Elanöa) is a comune in the province of Brescia, in Lombardy, Italy. It is situated on the left bank of the river Chiese, known locally as Clisi. As of 2011 Villanuova sul Clisi had a population of 5,837.

== Sister city ==
Villanuova sul Clisi is twinned with:

- Trébeurden, France, since 2000.
