= Félix Le Dantec =

French biologist and philosopher

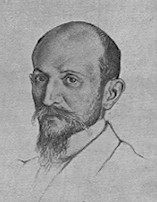
Portrait of Félix Le Dantec

Félix-Alexandre Le Dantec (16 January 1869 – 6 June 1917) was a French biologist and philosopher of science. He has been characterised as "fanatically Lamarckian, atheist, monist, materialist and determinist".

== Biography ==
Le Dantec was born on 16 January 1869 in Plougastel-Daoulas. He obtained his Bachelor of Science degree at the École Normale Supérieure in Paris, where he later worked as an associate-trainer in the laboratory of Louis Pasteur. He then became an assistant in the laboratory of chemical physiology at the École pratique des Hautes études under the directorship of Emile Duclaux. In 1889-90 he performed his military service in French Indochina as a participant of the Mission Pavie. Inspired by the work of Elie Metchnikoff, he supported his doctorate in science with a study on intracellular digestion in protozoa (1891). In 1891 he was sent by Pasteur to São Paulo in order to conduct investigations of endemic yellow fever.

In 1893 he was appointed lecturer of zoology at the University of Lyon, where he continued studies of intracellular digestion. Later, he returned to Paris (1896), where he worked in the laboratory of Alfred Giard at the École Normale Superieure and taught classes in embryology at the Sorbonne. During this time period, he began publishing a series of works on the philosophy of science. In 1900-01 he was stricken by tuberculosis, forcing a lengthy stay at the Hauteville sanatorium. Here he engaged in long discussions with a priest on the subjects of religion and atheism, publishing the book Le conflit (1901) as a result. In 1902, he returned to the Sorbonne, where from 1908, he taught classes in general biology.

He died on 6 June 1917 in Paris. The Lycée Félix Le Dantec in Lannion is named in his honor.

== Evolution ==
Le Dantec was a supporter of Lamarckian evolution. His book Lamarckiens et Darwiniens was reviewed in the Nature journal as "a well-intended, but scarcely adequate, endeavour to reconcile the Darwinian with the Lamarckian conception of evolution." He rejected the ideas of August Weismann and proposed his own biochemical theory of heredity which allowed for the inheritance of acquired characters.

== Scientism ==
Le Dantec was a positivist who found the approach of scientism useful:

"I believe in the future of Science: I believe that Science and Science alone will solve all the questions that make sense; I believe that it will penetrate to the mysteries of our emotional life and that it will even explain to me the origin and the structure of the hereditary anti-scientific mysticism that coexists with me in the most absolute scientism. But I am also convinced that men ask themselves many questions that mean nothing. Science will show the absurdity of these questions by not answering them, which will prove that they do not have an answer." (Grande revue, 1911)

== Selected works ==
- Le déterminisme biologique et la personnalité conscience, 1897 - Biological determinism and conscious personality.
- Evolution individuelle et hérédité, 1898 - Individual evolution and heredity.
- Lamarckiens et Darwiniens, 1899 - Darwinism and Lamarckism.
- Éléments de philosophie biologique, 1907 Paris: Felix Alcan Elements of Biological Philosophy
- L'athéisme, 1907 - Atheism.
- La crise du transformisme, 1909 - The crisis of transformation.
- Le chaos et l'harmonie universelle, 1911 - Chaos and universal harmony.
- Contre la Métaphysique. Questions de méthode., 1912
- La Science de la Vie, 1912. The Science of Life.
- Le problème de la mort et la conscience universelle, 1917 - The problem of death and universal consciousness.
