= Vâlcelele, Buzău =

Vâlcelele
- Commune
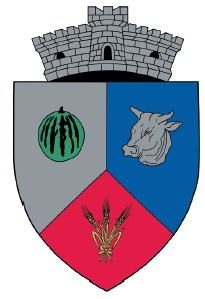
- Coat of arms

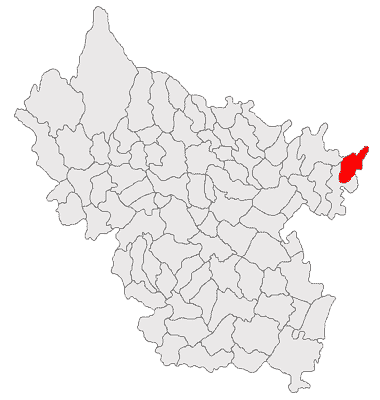
- Location in Buzău County

- Location in Romania
- Coordinates: 45°20′30″N 27°20′40″E
- Country: Romania
- County: Buzău

Government
  - Mayor (2020–2024): Liviu Bărăgan (PSD)
- Area: 47.7 km^{2} (18.4 sq mi)
- Elevation: 37 m (121 ft)
- Population (2021-12-01): 1,372
  - Density: 28.8/km^{2} (74.5/sq mi)
- Time zone: EET/EEST (UTC+2/+3)
- Postal code: 127670
- Area code: +(40) 238
- Vehicle reg.: BZ
- Website: primariavilcelelebuzau.ro

Vâlcelele is a commune in Buzău County, Muntenia, Romania. It is composed of a single village, Vâlcelele.

Historical population
Year	Pop.	±%
2002	1,849	—
2011	1,587	−14.2%
2021	1,372	−13.5%
Source: Census data

== Sister city ==
Vâlcelele is twinned with Trébeurden, France, since 1989.
