= Trébeurden =

Trébeurden Trebeurden
- Commune
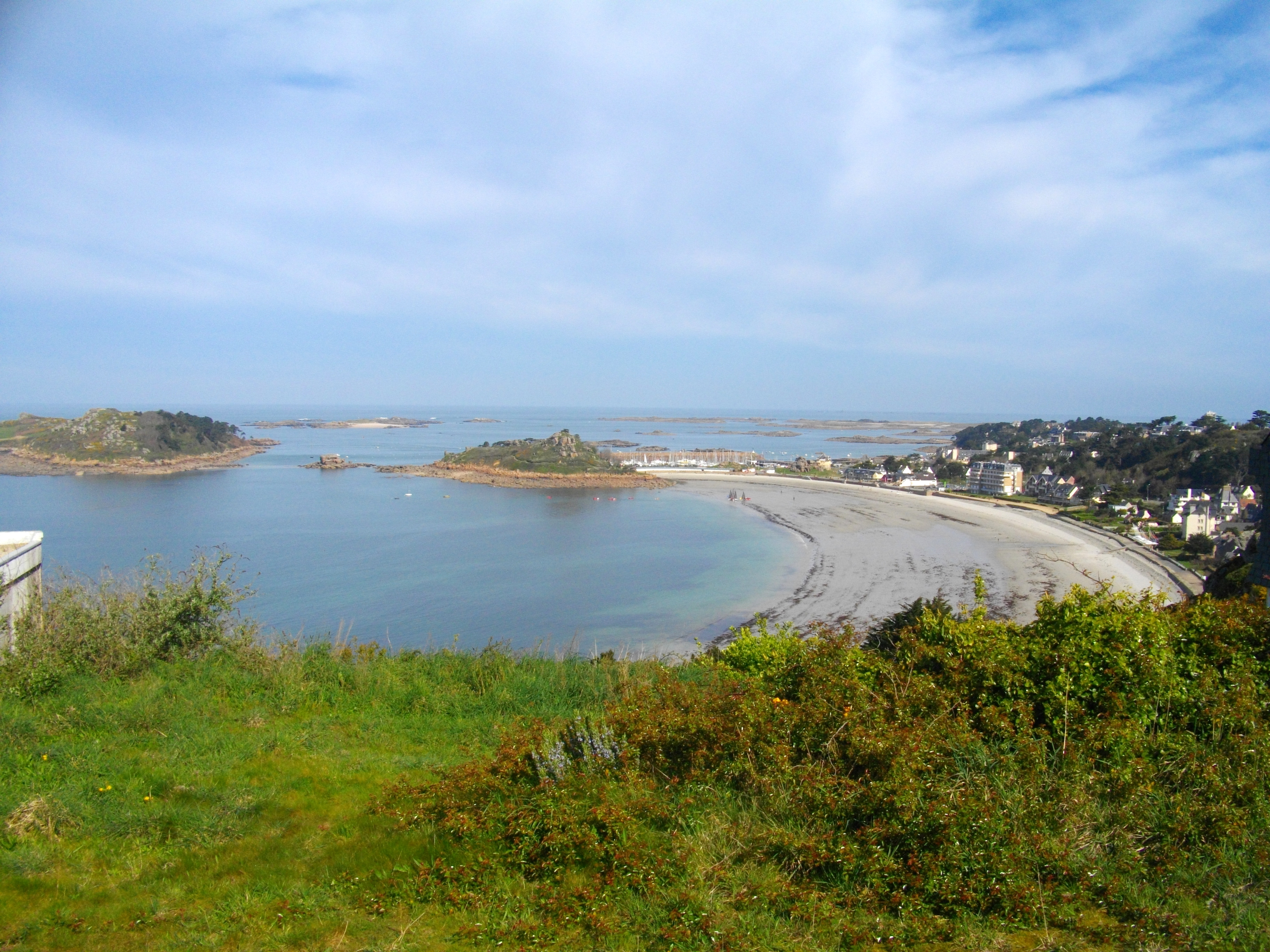
- Tresmeur beach, in Trébeurden

- Coat of arms
- Location of Trébeurden
- Location within France Location within Brittany
- Coordinates: 48°46′13″N 3°34′01″W
- Country: France
- Region: Brittany
- Department: Côtes-d'Armor
- Arrondissement: Lannion
- Canton: Perros-Guirec
- Intercommunality: Lannion-Trégor Communauté

Government
  - Mayor (2020–2026): Bénédicte Boiron
- Area^{1}: 13.40 km^{2} (5.17 sq mi)
- Highest elevation: 104 m (341 ft)
- Lowest elevation: 0 m (0 ft)
- Population (2023): 3,821
  - Density: 285.1/km^{2} (738.5/sq mi)
- Time zone: UTC+01:00 (CET)
  - Summer (DST): UTC+02:00 (CEST)
- INSEE/Postal code: 22343 /22560
- ^{1} French Land Register data, which excludes lakes, ponds, glaciers > 1 km^{2} (0.386 sq mi or 247 acres) and river estuaries.

Trébeurden (French pronunciation: [tʁebœʁdɛ̃]; Breton: Trebeurden) is a commune in the Côtes-d'Armor department of Brittany in northwestern France.

== Population ==
Inhabitants of Trébeurden are called trébeurdinais in French.

Historical population
Year	Pop.	±% p.a.
1968	2,650	—
1975	2,886	+1.23%
1982	3,228	+1.61%
1990	3,094	−0.53%
1999	3,451	+1.22%
2007	3,742	+1.02%
2012	3,670	−0.39%
2017	3,637	−0.18%
2023	3,821	+0.83%
Source: INSEE

== International relations ==
Trébeurden is twinned with:

- Vâlcelele, Buzău, Romania, since 1991
- Villanuova sul Clisi, Italy, since 2000
- (United Kingdom) Newton Ferrers, Devon, England, since 2010

== See also ==
- Communes of the Côtes-d'Armor department
