= Pleumeur-Bodou =

Pleumeur-Bodou Pleuveur-Bodoù
- Commune
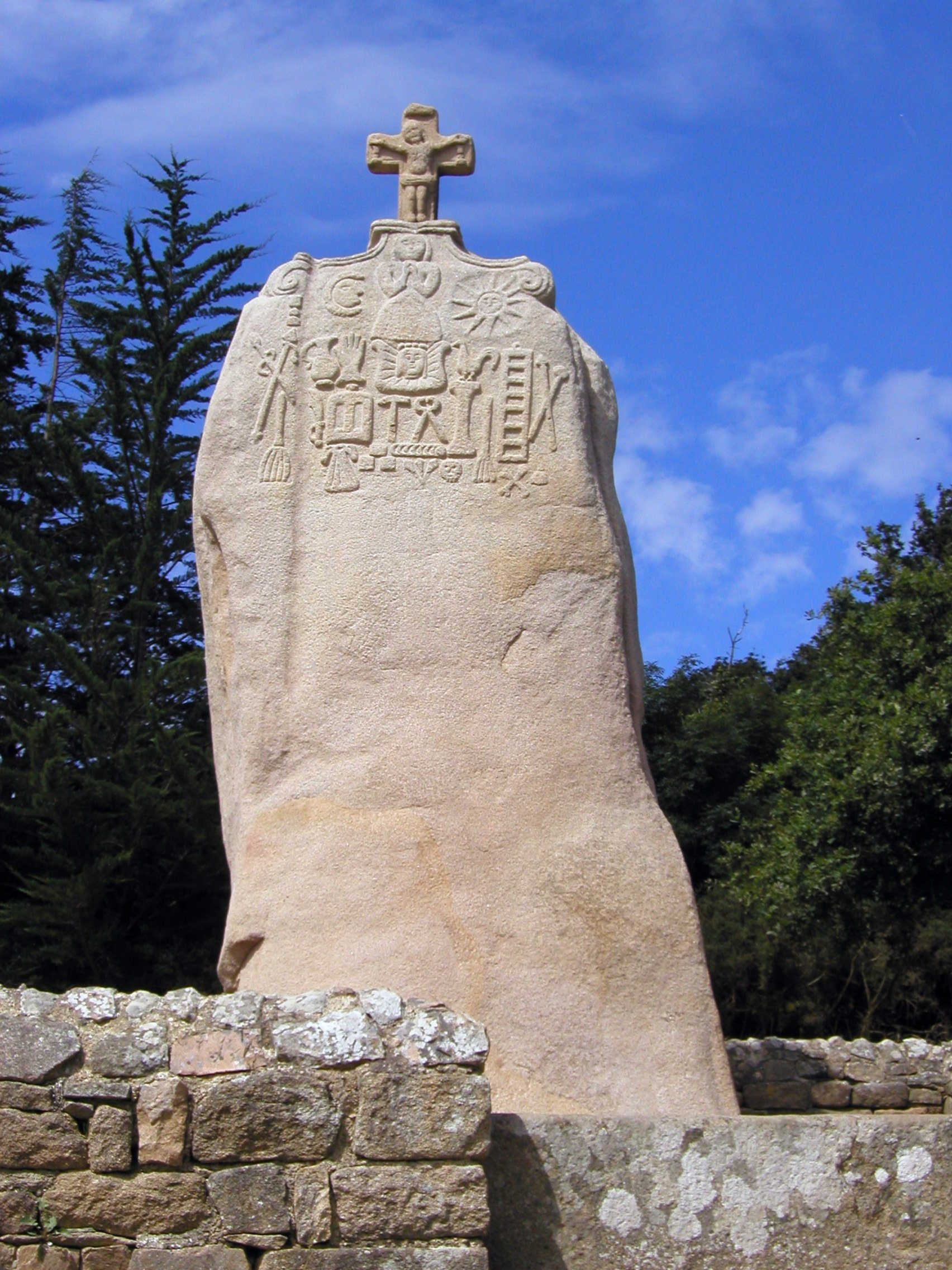
- Saint Uzec menhir

- Coat of arms
- Location of Pleumeur-Bodou
- Location within France Location within Brittany
- Coordinates: 48°46′36″N 3°30′59″W
- Country: France
- Region: Brittany
- Department: Côtes-d'Armor
- Arrondissement: Lannion
- Canton: Perros-Guirec
- Intercommunality: Lannion-Trégor Communauté

Government
  - Mayor (2020–2026): Pierre Terrien
- Area^{1}: 26.71 km^{2} (10.31 sq mi)
- Highest elevation: 106 m (348 ft)
- Lowest elevation: 0 m (0 ft)
- Population (2023): 3,848
  - Density: 144.1/km^{2} (373.1/sq mi)
- Time zone: UTC+01:00 (CET)
  - Summer (DST): UTC+02:00 (CEST)
- INSEE/Postal code: 22198 /22560
- ^{1} French Land Register data, which excludes lakes, ponds, glaciers > 1 km^{2} (0.386 sq mi or 247 acres) and river estuaries.

Pleumeur-Bodou (French pronunciation: [plømœʁ bɔdu]; Breton: Pleuveur-Bodoù) is a commune in the Côtes-d'Armor department of Brittany in northwestern France.

== Population ==
Inhabitants of Pleumeur-Bodou are called pleumeurois in French.

Historical population

Year	Pop.	±% p.a.
1793	2,151	—
1800	1,745	−2.94%
1806	1,907	+1.49%
1821	2,199	+0.95%
1831	2,360	+0.71%
1836	2,472	+0.93%
1841	2,465	−0.06%
1846	2,525	+0.48%
1851	2,650	+0.97%
1856	2,737	+0.65%
1861	2,864	+0.91%
1866	3,030	+1.13%
1872	3,034	+0.02%
1876	2,970	−0.53%
1881	2,778	−1.33%
1886	3,011	+1.62%
1891	2,955	−0.37%
1896	3,175	+1.45%
1901	3,019	−1.00%

Year	Pop.	±% p.a.
1906	3,257	+1.53%
1911	3,099	−0.99%
1921	2,949	−0.49%
1926	3,037	+0.59%
1931	2,752	−1.95%
1936	2,766	+0.10%
1946	2,920	+0.54%
1954	2,544	−1.71%
1962	2,545	+0.00%
1968	2,542	−0.02%
1975	2,941	+2.10%
1982	3,453	+2.32%
1990	3,677	+0.79%
1999	3,825	+0.44%
2007	3,996	+0.55%
2012	4,005	+0.05%
2017	3,925	−0.40%
2023	3,848	−0.33%

Source: EHESS and INSEE (1968-2023)

== Sister town ==
Pleuveur-Bodoù is twinned with Crosshaven, a village in Cork Harbour, Ireland.

== See also ==
- Communes of the Côtes-d'Armor department
- Telstar
