= Miklos Béres =

Hungarian footballer and manager

Personal information
- Full name: Miklos Alfred Béres
- Date of birth: 17 January 1936
- Place of birth: Diósgyőr, Miskolc, Hungary
- Date of death: 15 August 2021 (aged 85)
- Place of death: Sète, France
- Height: 1.72 m (5 ft 8 in)
- Position: Forward

Senior career*
Years	Team	Apps	(Gls)
1953–1956	Diósgyőri VTK		
1957–1958	US Le Mans		
1958–1959	AS Monaco		
1959–1961	Sète		
1961–1963	Angoulême		
1963–1965	US Perros-Louannec		
1965–1974	Ancenis		

International career
1956	Hungary (youth)	+1	(0)

Managerial career
- 1965–1994: Ancenis
- 1994–1998: Les Herbiers
- 1998–2001: Cholet
- 2001–2002: Carquefou
- * Club domestic league appearances and goals

Miklos Béres (17 January 1936 – 15 August 2021) was a French footballer who played as a forward for Sète in the early 1960s and who later coached Ancenis for 29 years, from 1965 until 1994, which is one of the longest managerial reigns in football history.

== Playing career ==
Born in the Miskolc town of Diósgyőr on 17 January 1936, Béres began his football career at his hometown club Diósgyőri VTK in 1953, aged 17, with whom he played for two years, until 1955. He quickly stood out from the rest, thus being called up to play for the Hungarian youth team (U21), and he took advantage of an away match to flee the country, which was in the middle of the Hungarian Revolution of 1956. He moved to France, where he played one season at both US Le Mans (1957–58) and AS Monaco (1958–59), before joining Sète in 1959.

In 1961, Béres joined the ranks Angoulême, where he stayed for two years, until 1963, when he moved to Brittany to play a further two seasons at US Perros-Louannec (1963–65).

== Managerial career ==
In 1965, the 29-year-old Béres, then a father of two children, agreed to work as a player-coach at Ancenis, as a means to prepare his coaching diploma and also to graduate as a PE teacher; he initially planned to stay there for just a few months, but he ended up not leaving Ancenis for the next 29 years, from 1965 until 1994. Under his leadership, the club won the Atlantic Cup in 1969, and led the club from the regional level to the Second Division in 1991. On some occasions, the club's stadium gathered more spectators than the population of the town (7,000 inhabitants). In 1991, the club received the honorary title of "best amateur club in France", and in that same year, Béres was nicknamed the "wizard of Davrays". His longevity as a coach and the results he achieved with Ancenis prompted Jacques Hamard, the club's captain from 1981 to 1986, to establish a parallel with Guy Roux, stating that Béres "was a bit like the Guy Roux of Ancenis", while club manager Jean-Michel Leconte stated that the city of "Ancenis owed its fame in those years to Miklos Bérès' RCA".

Outside football, he was a physical education and sports instructor, becoming a physical education teacher in Ancenis and obtaining French nationality in 1969. During his time at Ancenis, he was a member of the Loire-Atlantique Football District, participating in the Guérin scouting operations from the beginning, and joining the new District Technical Commission in 1979, remaining there until 1994, when he left Ancenis.

After leaving Ancenis in 1994, he took over Les Herbiers, which he led for four years, until 1998, when he became the coach of Cholet, remaining so for three years, until 2001, when he joined Carquefou, staying there for just one season. For the next two years, between 2002 and 2004, he represented the coaches on the Regional Disciplinary Committee of the Atlantic League. In 2004, Béres settled permanently in Sète, joining the management staff of amateur club Pointe-Courte, which he helped achieve promotion to CFA 2, before returning to Sète in 2008.

== Death ==
Béres died in Sète on 15 August 2021, at the age of 85, victim of cancer, and his funeral took place a few days later, on 20 August.

== See also ==
- List of longest managerial reigns in association football
