= Lutgardis =

Flemish saint

Saint Lutgardis OSB
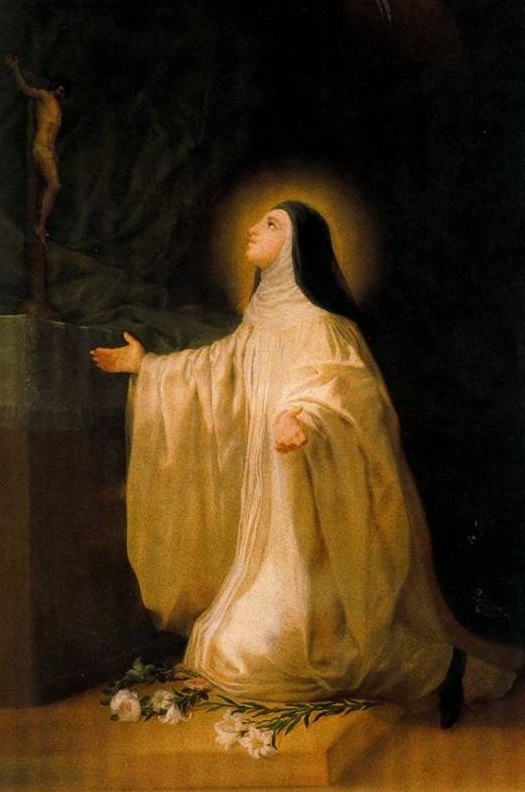
- Santa Lutgarda by Goya, 1787. Monasterio de San Joaquín y Santa Ana, Valladolid.

Virgin
- Born: 1182; Tongeren, Prince-Bishopric of Liège, Holy Roman Empire
- Died: 16 June 1246; Aywières, Prince-Bishopric of Liège, Holy Roman Empire
- Venerated in: Roman Catholic Church
- Feast: 16 June
- Attributes: as Christ shows her his wounded side; habit and attributes of a Cistercian abbess; being blinded by the Heart of Jesus; nun to whom Christ extends his hand from the cross; in attendance when Christ shows his Heart to the Father
- Patronage: birth; blind people; childbirth; disabled people; Flanders; Flemish National Movement

Lutgardis of Aywières, OSB (Dutch: Sint-Ludgardis; 1182 – 16 June 1246; also spelled Lutgarde) was a Catholic Benedictine nun from the medieval Low Countries in the Holy Roman Empire. She was born in Tongeren, known as Tongres in French (which is why she is also called Lutgardis of Tongres or Luitgard of Tonger(e)n), and entered monastic life at the age of twelve. During her life, various miracles were attributed to her, and she is known to have experienced religious ecstasy. Her feast day is 16 June.

== Life ==
Lutgardis was born at Tongeren in 1182. She was admitted into the Benedictine monastery of St. Catherine near Sint-Truiden at the age of twelve, not because of a vocation but because her dowry had been lost in a failed business venture. She was attractive, fond of nice clothes and liked to enjoy herself. For Lutgarde the cloister represented a socially acceptable alternative to the disgrace of unmarried life in the world. She lived in the convent for several years without having much interest in religious life. She could come and go and receive visitors as she pleased.

According to her Vita, it was in the parlour, a welcome break in the monotony of monastic observance, that she was visited with a vision of Jesus Christ showing her his wounds, and at age twenty she made her solemn vows as a Benedictine. Some of the sisters predicted that her change in behavior would not last. Instead, she became even more devout. Over the next dozen years, she had many visions of Christ, Mary and St. John the Evangelist. Robert Bellarmine relates a story that Pope Innocent III, when recently deceased, appeared to Lutgardis in her monastery to thank her for the prayers and sacrifices she had offered for him during his reign as Roman Pontiff.

Accounts of her life state that she experienced ecstasies, levitated, and dripped blood from her forehead and hair when entranced. She refused the honor of serving as abbess. However, in 1205, she was chosen to be prioress of her community.

In 1208, at Aywières (Awirs), near Liège, she joined the Cistercians, a stricter order, on the advice of her friend Christina. The nuns of Aywières spoke French, not Lutgarde's native Flemish. Lutgard deliberately did not learn French in order to live in greater silence. Living, working, and praying in the midst of her sisters she experienced a loneliness and solitude that she had never known before. Nonetheless, she contributed powerful images to the developing Christocentric mysticism.

The prolific multiplication of Cistercian monasteries of women in the Low Countries obliged the White Nuns to turn to the newly founded friars, disciples of Francis and Dominic, rather than to their brother monks, for spiritual and sacramental assistance. Lutgarde was a friend and mother to the early Dominicans and Franciscans, supporting their preaching by her prayer and fasting, offering them hospitality, ever eager for news of their missions and spiritual conquests. Her first biographer relates that the friars named her mater praedicatorum, the mother of preachers.

Lutgardis was one of the great precursors of the devotion to the Sacred Heart of Jesus. The first recorded mystic revelation of Christ's heart is that of Lutgardis. According to Thomas Merton, Lutgardis "…entered upon the mystical life with a vision of the pierced Heart of the Saviour, and had concluded her mystical espousals with the Incarnate Word by an exchange of hearts with Him." When, in a visitation, Christ came to Lutgarde, offering her whatever gift of grace she should desire, she asked for a better grasp of Latin, that she might better understand the Word of God and lift her voice in choral praise. Christ granted her request and, after a few days, Lutgarde's mind was flooded with the riches of psalms, antiphons, readings and responsories. However, a painful emptiness persisted. With disarming candour she returned to Christ, asking to return his gift, and wondering if she might, just possibly, exchange it for another. “And for what would you exchange it?” Christ asked. “Lord, said Lutgarde, I would exchange it for your Heart.” Christ then reached into Lutgarde and, removing her heart, replaced it with his own, at the same time hiding her heart within his breast.

During this time she is known to have shown gifts of healing and prophecy, and was an adept at teaching the Gospels. She was blind for the last eleven years of her life, and died of natural causes at Aywières. According to tradition, she experienced a vision in which Christ informed her of her forthcoming death. She died on 16 June 1246, the day after the Feast of the Holy Trinity, at the age of 64.

== Veneration ==
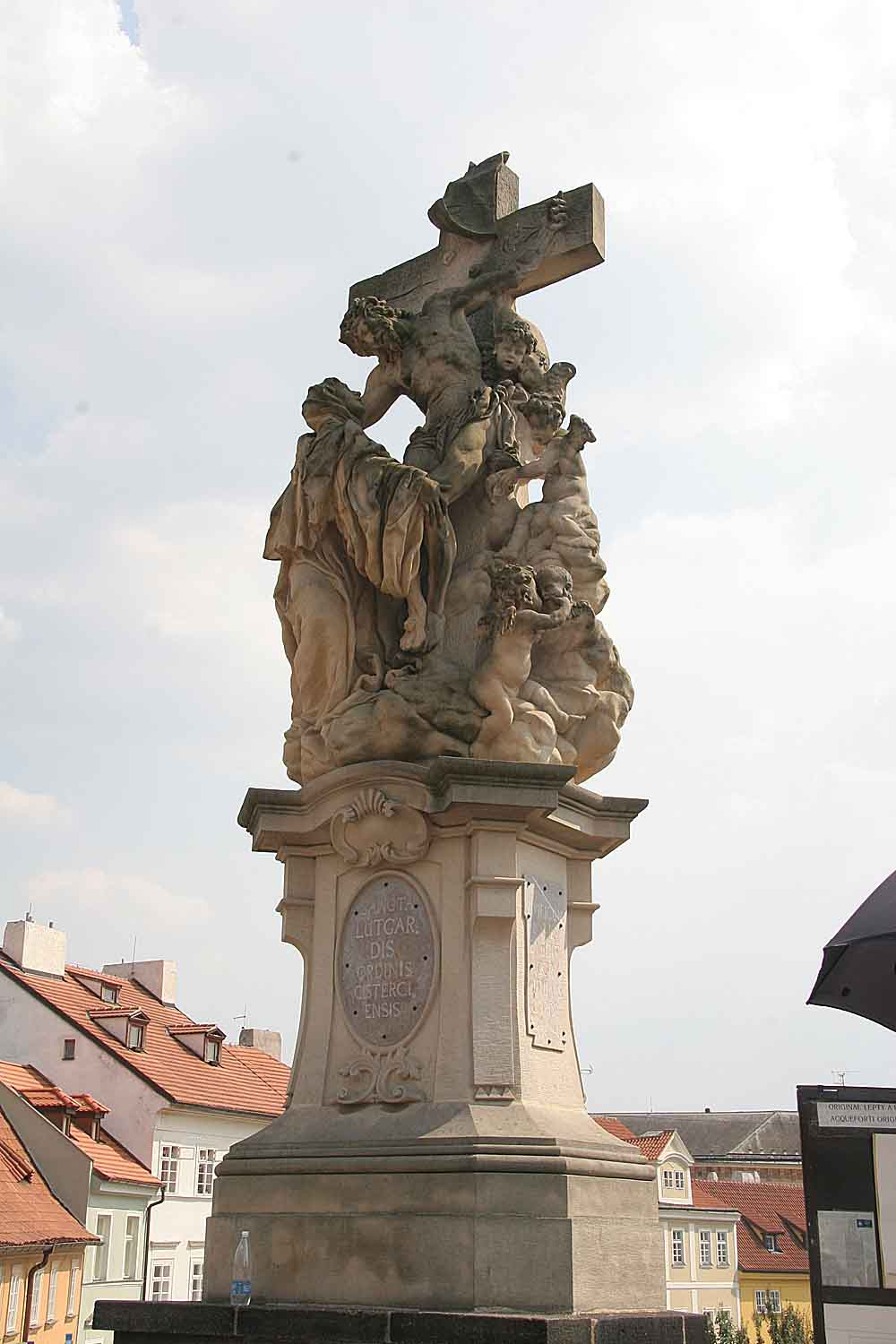
Statue of Saint Luitgard on Charles Bridge

Lutgardis is considered one of the leading mystics of the 13th century. A life of Lutgardis, Vita Lutgardis, was composed less than two years after her death by Thomas of Cantimpre, a Dominican friar and a theologian of some ability. A Middle Dutch verse translation of this, the Leven van Lutgart, was produced in the second half of the 13th century and is now regarded as one of the canonical works of Dutch literature. Lutgardis was venerated at Aywières for centuries, and her relics were exhumed in the 16th century. On 4 December 1796, as a result of the French Revolution, her relics were sheltered at Ittre, where they remain. Works of art depicting the saint include a baroque statue of Lutgardis by Matthias Braun on Charles Bridge in Prague and a painting by Goya. The statue on Charles Bridge (socha sv. Luitgardy) was sculpted by Braun in 1710 as a commission from Evžen Tyttl, the abbot of the Cistercian monastery in Plasy.

Pope Francis pays tribute to Lutgardis as one of a number of "holy women" who have "spoken of resting in the heart of the Lord as the source of life and interior peace".

She is the patroness saint of the blind and physically disabled.

== See also ==
- Luitgard of Wittichen
