= List of protected heritage sites in Ittre =

This table shows an overview of the protected heritage sites in the Walloon town Itter, or Ittre. This list is part of Belgium's national heritage.

| Object | Year/architect | Town/section | Address | Coordinates | Number^{?} | Image |
|---|---|---|---|---|---|---|
| Farm of the Motte: facades and roofs, including outbuildings, except for the modern parts ^{(nl)} ^{(fr)} | | Itter | | 50.672540°N 4.237771°E | 25044-CLT-0003-01 Info | |
| Church of Saint-Laurent and its surroundings ^{(nl)} ^{(fr)} | | Itter | | 50.652509°N 4.298440°E | 25044-CLT-0004-01 Info | Kerk Saint-Laurent en omgeving |
| Woodlands of Bois des Rocs ^{(nl)} ^{(fr)} | | Itter | | 50.626294°N 4.214871°E | 25044-CLT-0005-01 Info | |
| Country house "La Tourette": facades and roofs ^{(nl)} ^{(fr)} | | Itter | rue d'Asquempont, n°2 | 50.641990°N 4.236712°E | 25044-CLT-0006-01 Info | |

== See also ==
- Lists of protected heritage sites in Walloon Brabant
- Ittre
