= Statue of Ivo of Kermartin, Charles Bridge =

Statue in Prague, Czech Republic

Statue of Ivo of Kermartin
- Sousoší svatého Iva (Czech)
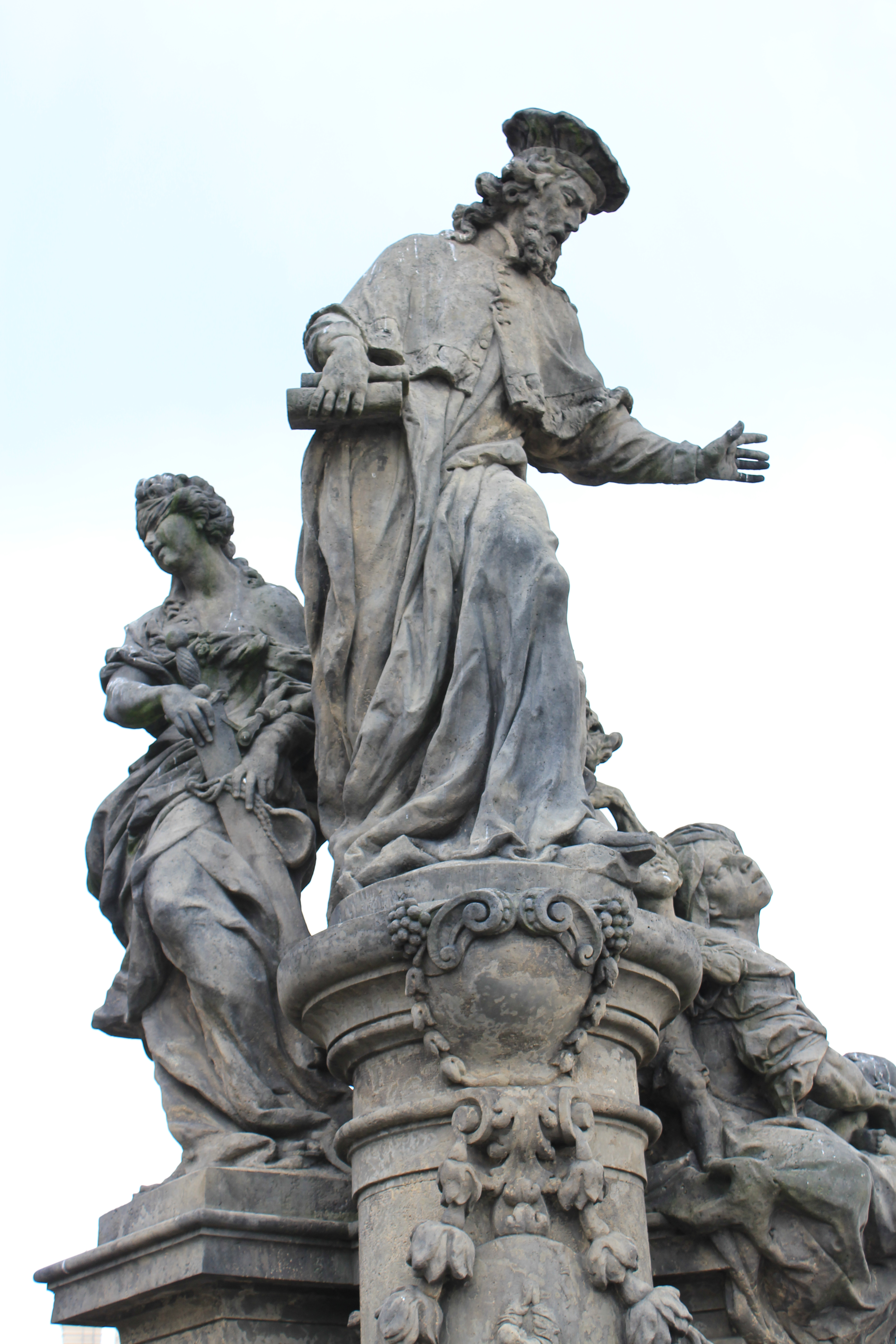
- The statue in 2014
- Artist: Matthias Braun
- Type: Sculpture
- Subject: Ivo of Kermartin
- Location: Prague, Czech Republic; 50°05′10″N 14°24′47″E

A statue of Ivo of Kermartin (Czech: Sousoší svatého Iva) by Matthias Braun is installed on the south side of the Charles Bridge in Prague, Czech Republic.
