= Schmerling Caves =

Caves and archaeological site in Belgium

- Grottes d'Engis, Engis Caves
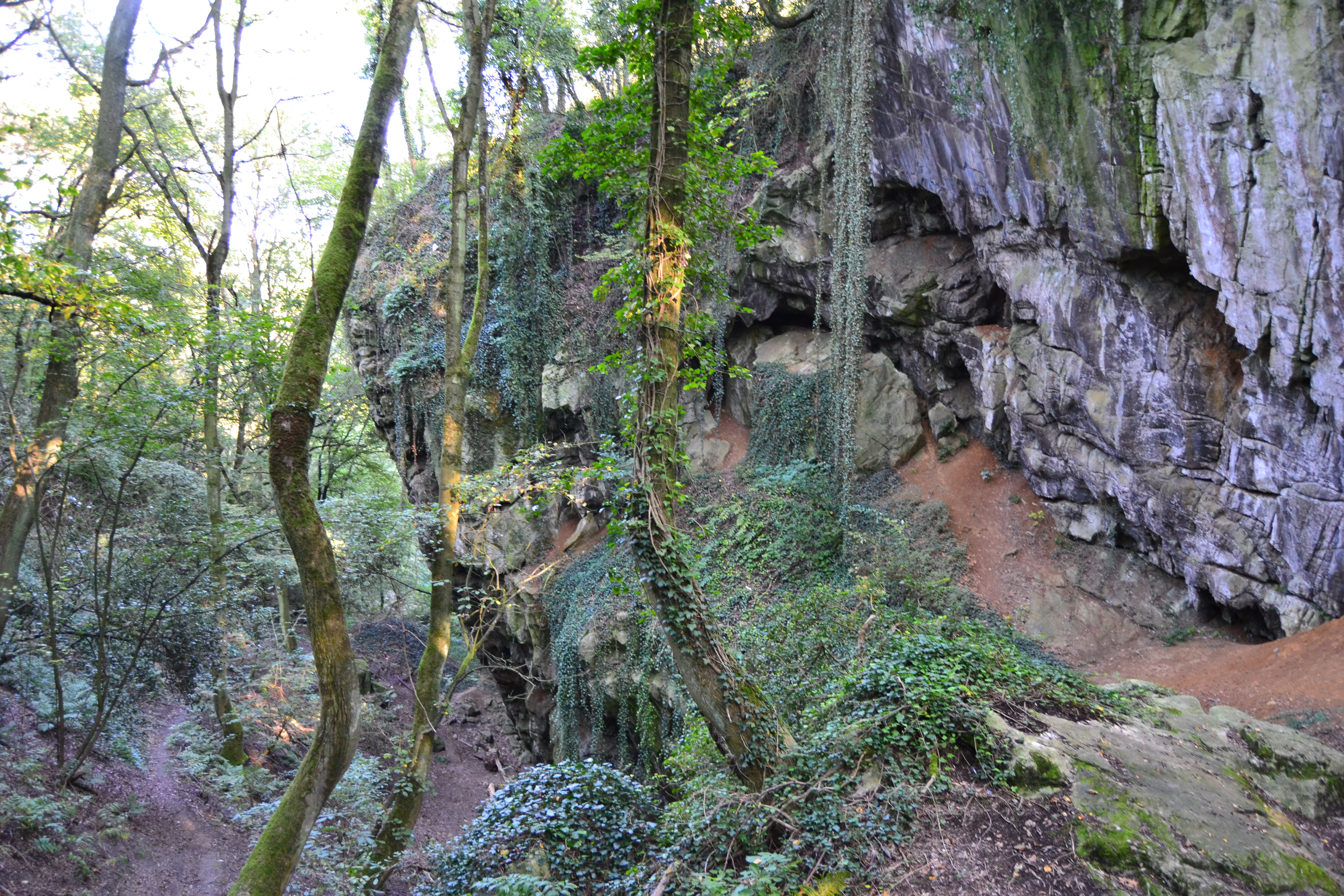
- Valley of the Awirs with the Schmerling Caves

- Location within Belgium Location within Europe
- Location: Near Awirs and Engis, in Flémalle, Belgium
- Coordinates: 50.592222°N 5.408889°E
- Length: 17 metres (56 ft), formerly at least 29 metres (95 ft); 5 metres (16 ft) wide
- Height variation: 4–5 metres (13–16 ft), formerly at least 15 metres (49 ft)
- Elevation: approx. 111 metres (364 ft)
- Discovery: 1829
- Geology: Limestone
- Entrances: At least three, but some collapsed
- Hazards: Unstable; at least two chambers have collapsed
- Access: Protected as a heritage site
- Registry: Cultural Heritage of Wallonia (1979); Exceptional Cultural Heritage of Wallonia (2013)

The Schmerling Caves (also known as Grottes d'Engis, meaning Engis Caves) are a group of caves located in Wallonia on the right bank of the stream called the Awirs, near the village of Awirs in Flémalle, Belgium. The caves are notable for their past fossil finds, particularly of hominins. They were explored in 1829 by Philippe-Charles Schmerling, who discovered, in the lower cave, the remains of two individuals, one of which, now known as Engis 2, was a fossil of the first Neanderthal ever found; the other was a Neolithic homo sapiens. Also known as Trô Cwaheur or Trou Caheur, this lower cave has since collapsed. A third cave was destroyed due to work at the adjacent quarry, the Ancienne Carrière des Awirs.

The caves have been classified on the list of Cultural Heritage of Wallonia sites since 1978, as well as Exceptional Cultural Heritage of Wallonia since 2013, because of the Neanderthal fossil.

== Name, location, and finds ==
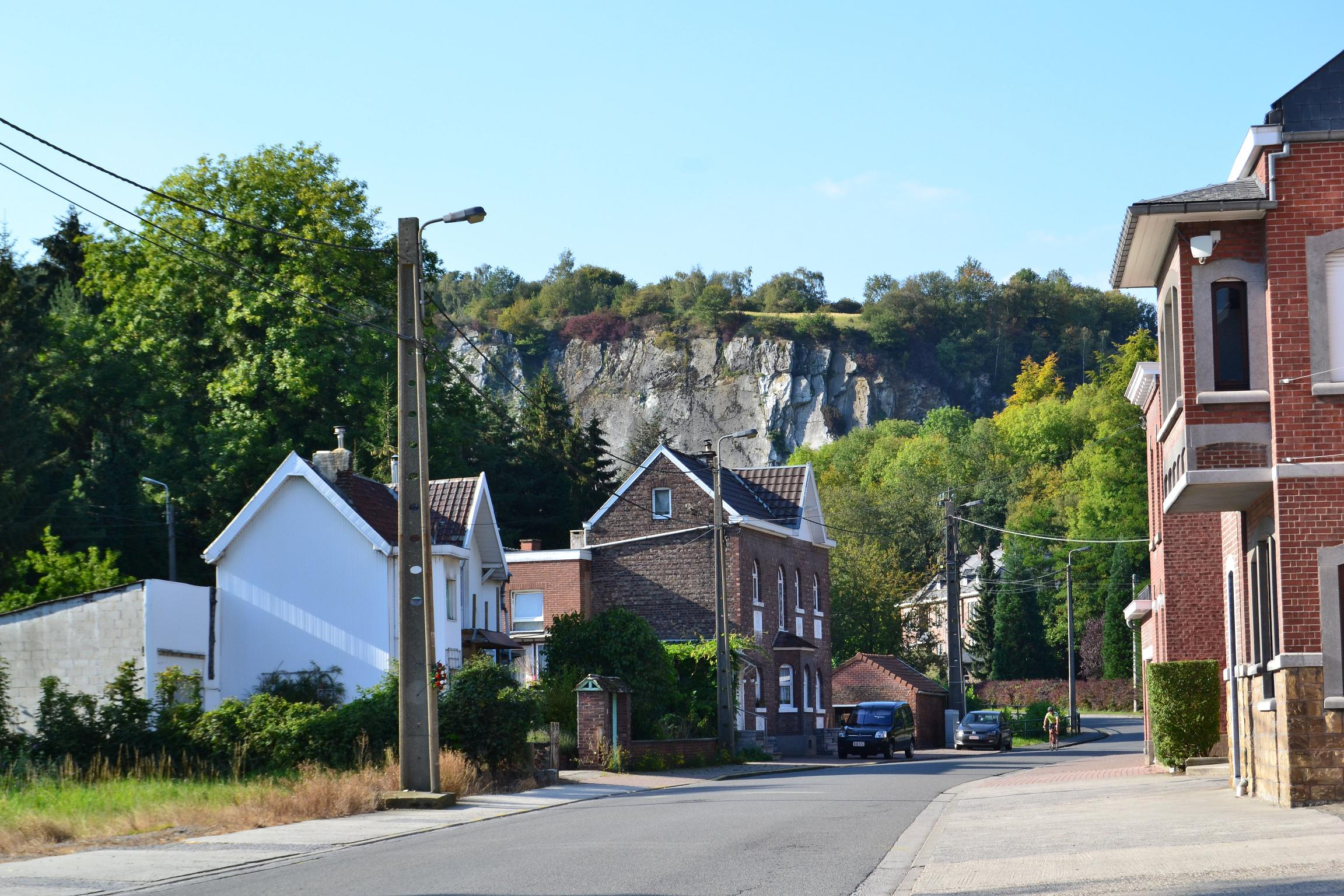
View of the Awirs quarry, with overhanging Plateau des Fagnes in the valley of Awirs, on the right bank of the stream, coming from the confluence with the Meuse. The caves are to the right of the quarry.

Schmerling named the caves for Engis because he accessed them from the Plateau des Fagnes, which is in the Engis commune. He was able to reach them by lowering himself with a rope and sliding down the slope of the rock face. The caves themselves are actually within the boundaries of the commune of Awirs. In 1951, a local group "corrected" the error by placing a plaque at the lower cave, identifying it as the Schmerling Cave.

Schmerling thought he had found the remains of three people in the caves. In the vicinity, he also found tools fashioned by humans. The tools and the carvings made with silex led him to argue that "antediluvian" man's hands must have been responsible even if human remains hadn't been found; Schmerling was thus one of the first to accept the existence of a prehistoric human. The child's skull was not identified as Neanderthal until 1936.

A monument for Schmerling, consisting of a bust on a base made of stone, was erected at the foot of the hill in 1989; it was moved to the town square of Awirs in 2001.

== Description ==
=== Upper cave ===
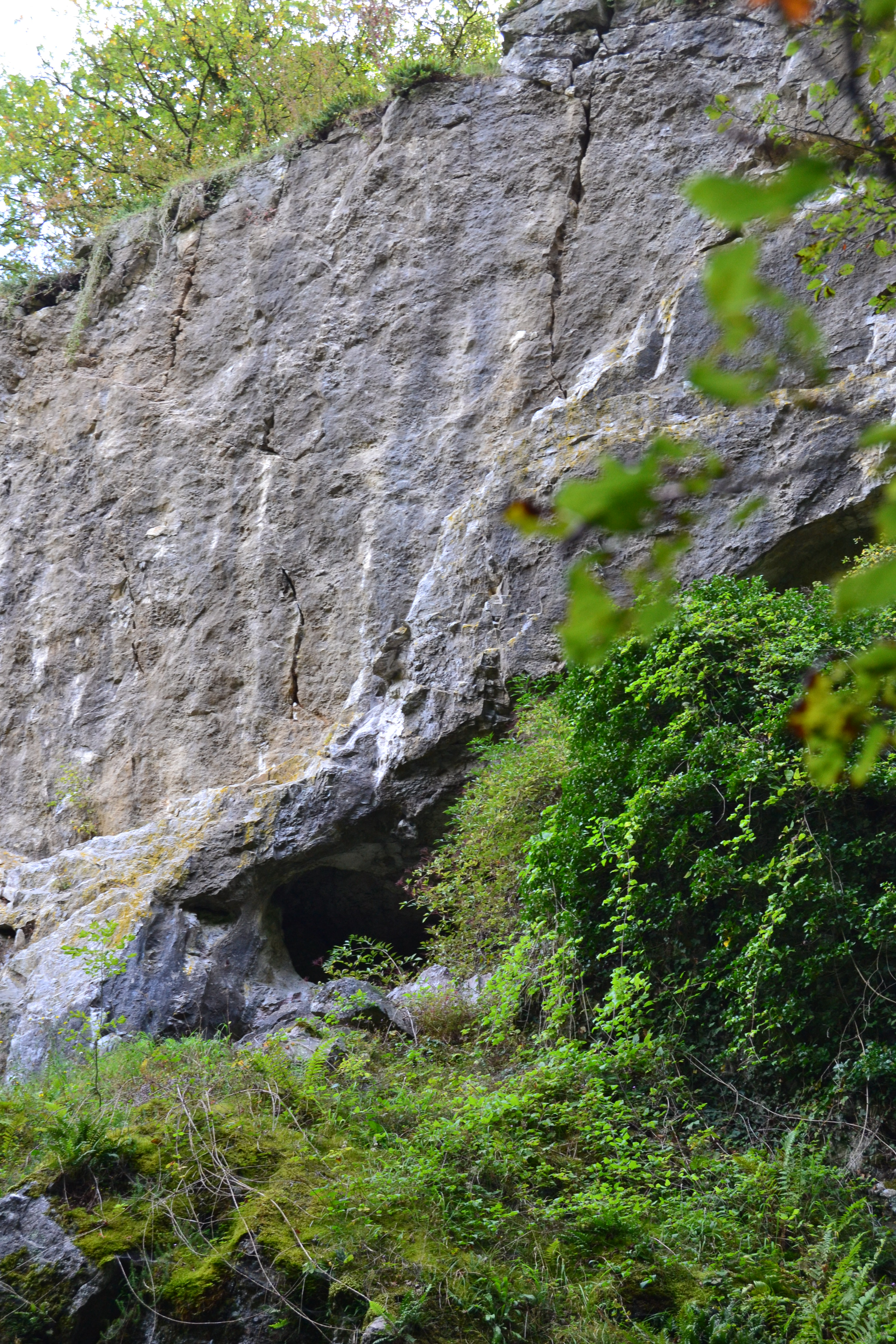
Upper cave; above, plateau des Fagnes from which Schmerling descended

The measurements of the upper cave, which opens to the north, are 5m wide, 6m high, 17m deep, with a small gallery on the right. At its entrance, in 2m of soil, Schmerling found:

- a human incisor
- a human thoracic vertebrae
- a human phalanx bone
- remains of bears, hyena, horses, and ruminants
- silex tools.

=== Lower cave ===
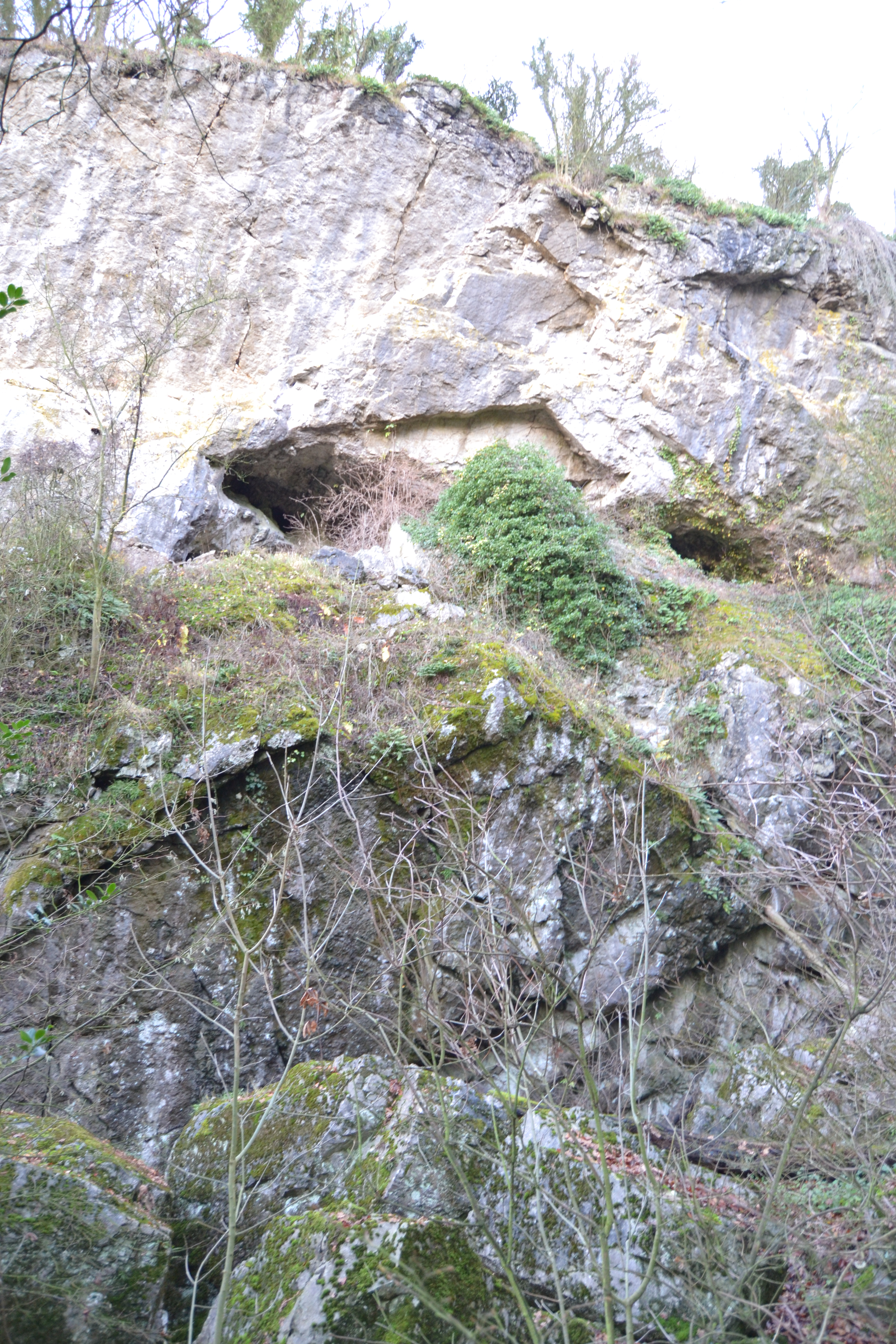
Upper caves, and ruins of the bottom cave.

The lower cave was known as Trô Cwaheur. It also opened to the north but has since been destroyed following collapses in 1993 and 2006. At the time of Schmerling's exploration, it measured 4 m wide by 5 m high. A first chamber was 12 m deep and the cave continued beyond as a gallery with soil and bones. To the left of the entrance was another gallery with stalactites measuring 150cm long. Another gallery ascended into a second, smaller, chamber which was strewn with bones:

- bones of bear, hyena, rhinoceros; some entire, some broken and showing evidence of having been moved by water
- a large human incisor
- an upper jaw bone with worn teeth
- two vertebrae
- a collarbone
- fragments of a radial bone and ulna
- a metacarpal bone and metatarsal bones
- next to animal remains, the skull of Neolithic homo sapiens, an older individual with the facial bones missing; designated Engis 1
- a second skull which fell to pieces when touched. Examination of the upper jaw revealed that adult molars had not yet descended: the individual was 5 or 6 years old at the time of death, and was designated Engis 2, following Schmerling. Milk teeth, collarbone, fragments of a radial bone, ulna, and vertebrae were found as well, leading the discoverer to think he had found the remains of three different individuals. The skull is registered as a national treasure on the List of Classified Properties of the French Community.

=== Other finds ===
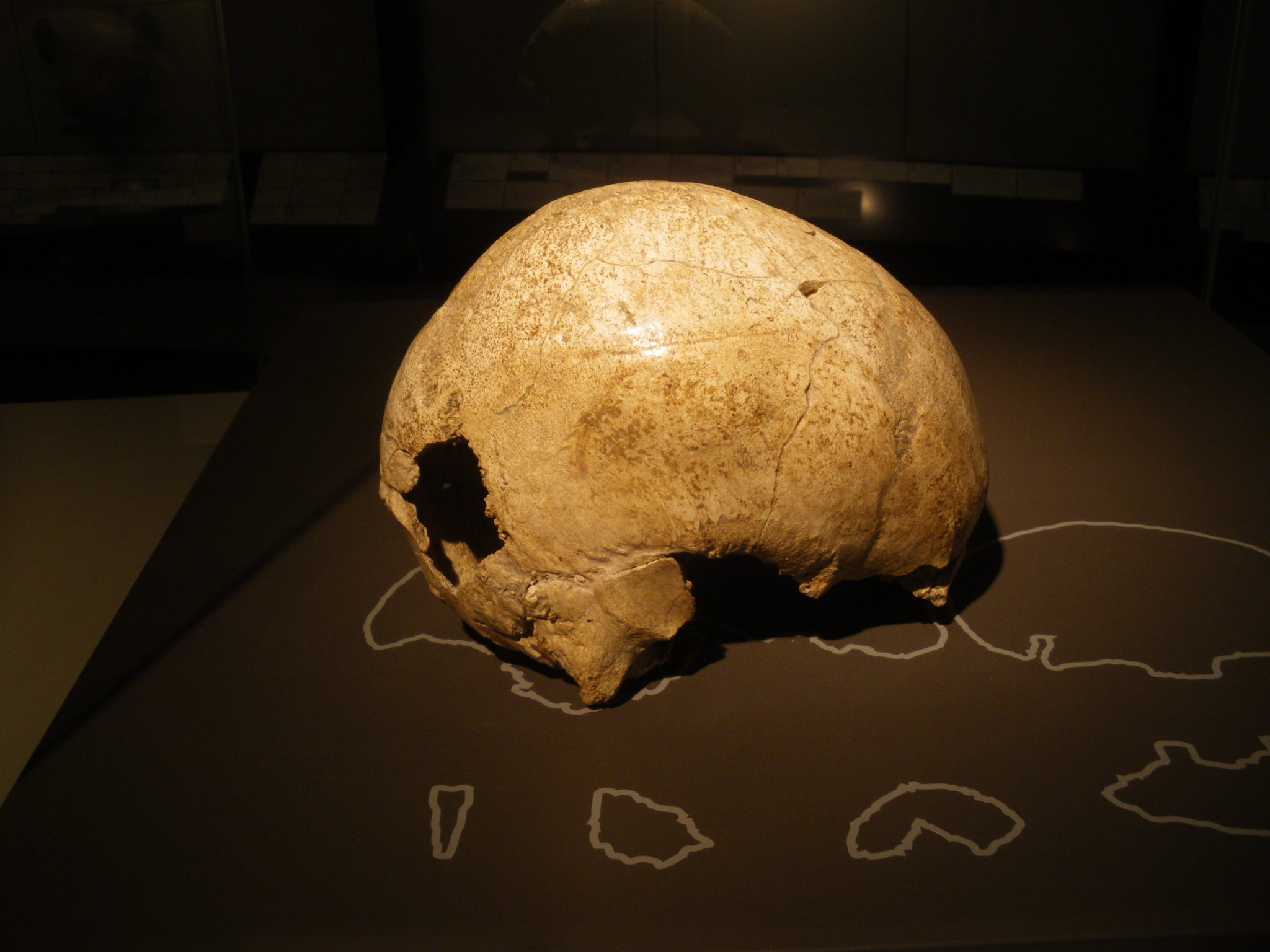
Engis 1, one of two skulls found by Schmerling, is of a Neolithic homo sapiens; collection of the Curtius Museum.

There was a third cave, to the east, which was destroyed in the exploitation of the quarry. Later researchers who explored the hill found two more caves, one of them a grave site with two Neolithic skeletons.

Grains of wheat were found in the Engis cave.

== See also ==
- Grotte de Rosée, a nearby cave
