= Ivo of Kermartin =

Breton Catholic saint (1253–1303)

Saint Ivo of Kermartin TOSF
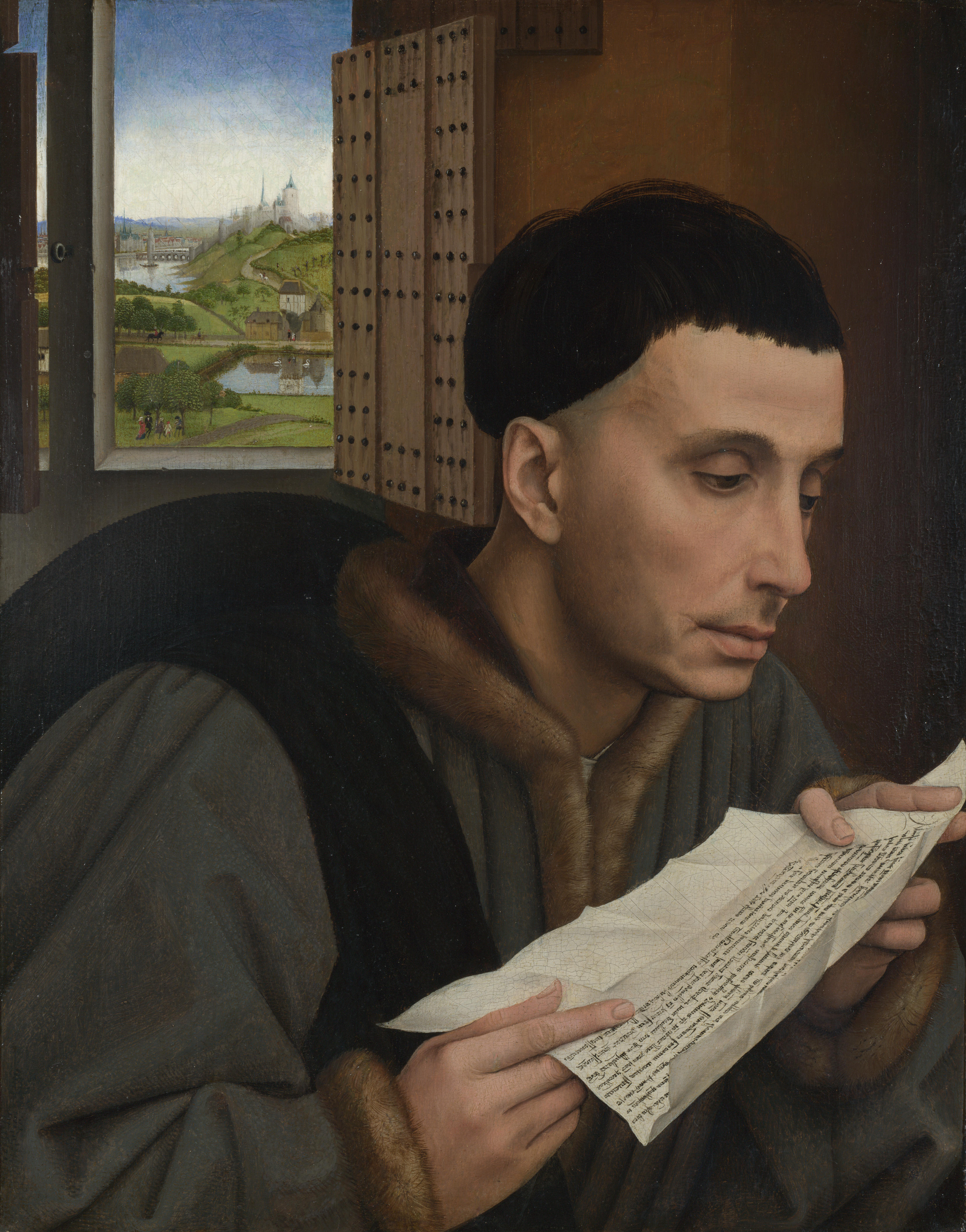
- Saint Ivo portrayed by Rogier van der Weyden (15th century)
- Born: 17 October 1253; Kermartin, Duchy of Brittany
- Died: 19 May 1303 (aged 49); Louannec, Duchy of Brittany
- Venerated in: Roman Catholic Church
- Canonized: June 1347 by Pope Clement VI
- Major shrine: Tréguier, Cotes d'Armor, France
- Feast: 19 May
- Attributes: Purse in his hand, scroll, between a rich man and a poor one

Ivo of Kermartin, TOSF (17 October 1253 – 19 May 1303), also known as Yvo, Yves, or Ives (and in Breton as Erwan, Iwan, Youenn or Eozenn, depending on the region, and known as Yves Hélory (also Helori or Heloury) in French), was a parish priest among the poor of Louannec, the only one of his station to be canonized in the Middle Ages. He is the patron of Brittany, lawyers, and abandoned children. His feast day is 19 May. Poetically, he is referred to as "advocate of the poor".

== Life ==
Born at Kermartin, a manor near Tréguier in Brittany, on 17 October 1253, Ivo was the son of Helori, lord of Kermartin, and Azo du Kenquis. In 1267 Ivo was sent to the Faculty of Law of Paris (University of Paris), where he graduated in civil law. While other students caroused, Ivo studied, prayed and visited the sick. He also refused to eat meat or drink wine. Among his fellow-students were the scholars Duns Scotus and Roger Bacon. He went to Orléans in 1277 to study canon law under Peter de la Chapelle, a famous journalist who later became bishop of Toulouse and a cardinal.

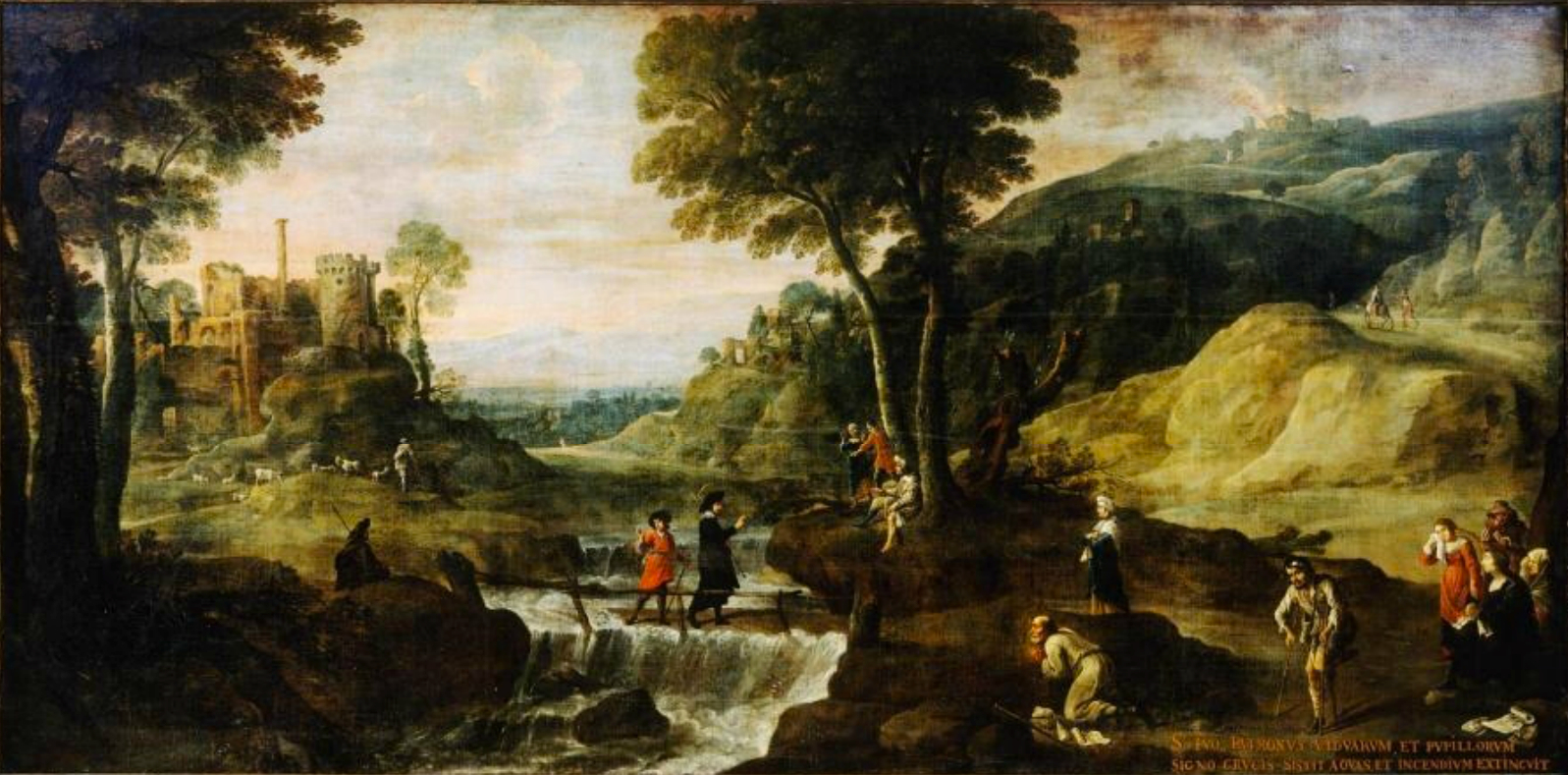
Landscape with the Preaching of Saint Ivo, by Lucas van Uden

On his return to Brittany, having received minor orders, he was appointed an "official", the title given to an ecclesiastical judge, of the archdeanery of Rennes (1280). He protected orphans and widows, defended the poor, and rendered fair and impartial verdicts. It is said that even those on the losing side respected his decisions. Ivo also represented the helpless in other courts, paid their expenses and visited them in prison. Although it was common to give judges "gifts", Ivo refused bribes. He often helped many disputing parties settle out of court so they could save money.

Meanwhile, he studied Scripture, and there are strong reasons for believing the tradition held among Franciscans that he joined the Third Order of St. Francis sometime later at Guingamp. Ivo was ordained to the priesthood in 1284. He continued to practice law and once, when a mother and son could not resolve many of their differences, he offered a Mass for them. They immediately reached a settlement.

Ivo was soon invited by the Bishop of Tréguier to become his official, and accepted the offer in 1284. He displayed great zeal and rectitude in the discharge of his duty and did not hesitate to resist taxation by the king, which he considered an encroachment on the rights of the Church. Due to his charity he gained the title of advocate and patron of the poor. Having been ordained he was appointed to the parish of Tredrez in 1285.

Eight years later he was sent to Louannec, where he built a hospital and himself helped care for the sick. Ivo died in 1303 of natural causes after a life of hard work and repeated fasting.

== The Widow of Tours ==
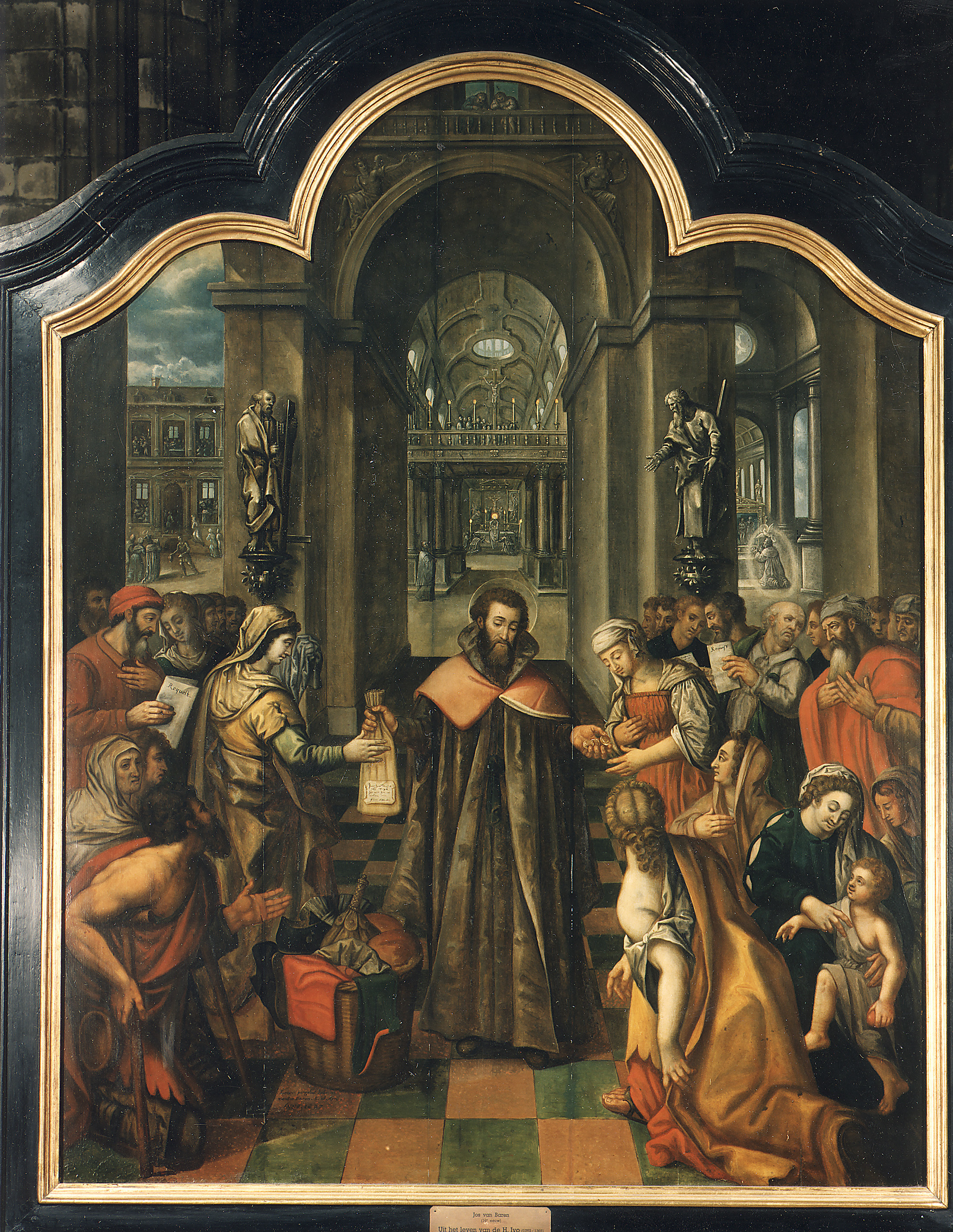
St Ivo Giving Alms to the Poor by Josse van der Baren

John Wigmore retells the famous story of St. Ives and the Widow of Tours, writing in the Fordham Law Review in 1936:

Tours was near Orleans; the bishop held his court there; and Ivo, while visiting the court, lodged with a certain widow. One day he found his widow-landlady in tears. Her tale was that next day she must go to court to answer to the suit of a traveling merchant who had tricked her. It seemed that two of them, Doe and Roe, lodging with her, had left in her charge a casket of valuables, while they went off on their business, but with the strict injunction that she was to deliver it up again only to the two of them jointly demanding it. That day, Doe had come back, and called for the casket, saying that his partner Roe was detained elsewhere. She in good faith in his story had delivered the casket to Doe, but then later came Roe demanding it, charging his partner with wronging him, and holding the widow responsible for delivering up the casket to Doe contrary to the terms of their directions. She stated if she had to pay for those valuables it would ruin her. "Have no fear", said young Ivo, "You should indeed have waited for the two men to appear together, but I will go to court tomorrow, for you, and will save you from ruin". So when the case was called before the Judge, and the merchant Roe charged the widow with breach of faith, "Not so", pleaded Ivo, "My client need not yet make answer to this claim. The plaintiff has not proved his case. The terms of the bailment were that the casket should be demanded by the two merchants coming together, but here is only one of them making the demand. "Where is the other? Let the plaintiff produce his partner." The judge promptly approved his plea, whereupon the merchant, required to produce his fellow, turned pale, fell a-trembling, and would have retired. The judge, suspecting something from his plight, ordered him to be arrested and questioned; the other merchant was also traced and brought in, and the casket was recovered; which, when opened, was found to contain nothing but old junk. In short, the two rascals had conspired to plant the casket with the widow, and then to coerce her to pay them the value of the alleged contents. Thus the young advocate saved the widow from ruin.

== Legacy ==
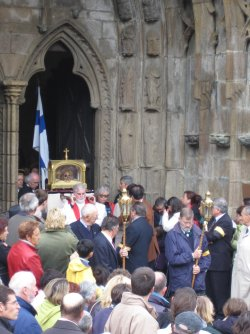
The relics of Saints Ivo and Tugdual in a procession at the gate of Tréguier's cathedral in 2005. In the reliquary is the skull of Saint Ivo.

On the occasion of the 700th anniversary of the death of St. Ivo, Pope John Paul II said, "The values proposed by St Ivo retain an astonishing timeliness. His concern to promote impartial justice and to defend the rights of the poorest persons invites the builders of Europe today to make every effort to ensure that the rights of all, especially the weakest, are recognized and defended."

Saint Yves is the patron of lawyers. As a result, many law schools and associations of Catholic lawyers have taken his name. For instance, the Society of St. Yves in Jerusalem (a Catholic Center for Human Rights and Legal Aid, Resources and Development), the Conférence Saint-Yves in Luxembourg (the Luxembourg Catholic Lawyers Association), or the Association de la Saint Yves Lyonnais.

== Veneration ==
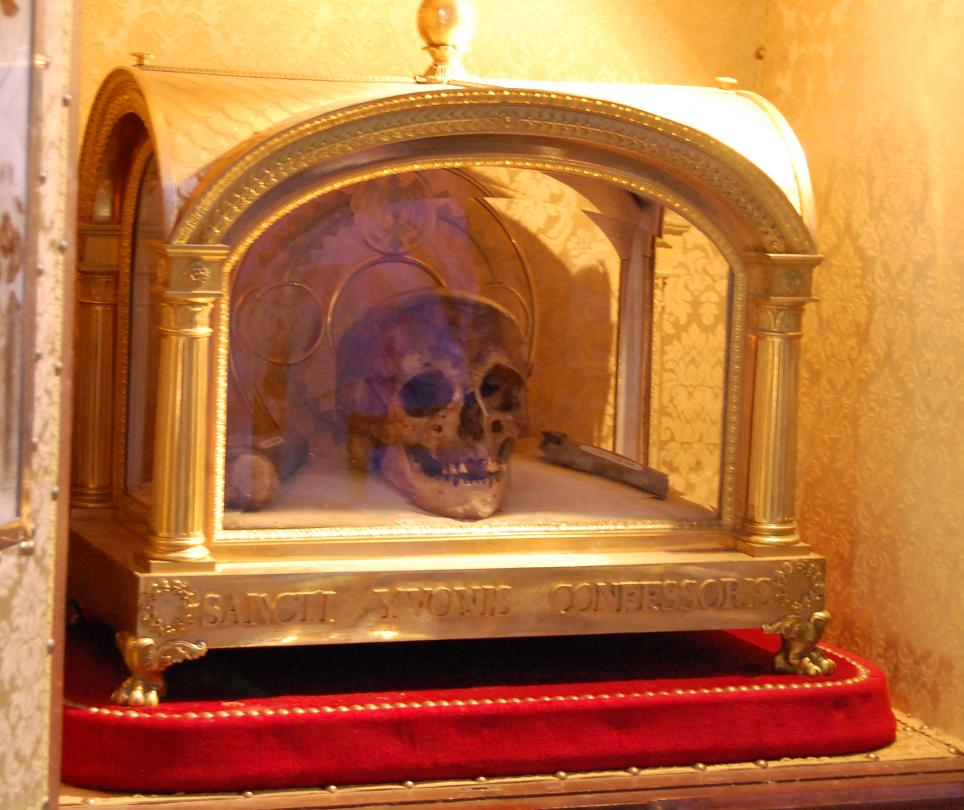
Relic skull and reliquary of St. Ivo in Tréguier, Brittany, France

He was buried in Minihy-Tréguier in the church he founded.

Bretons sang a song about Ivo:

Sanctus Ivo erat Brito
Advocatus et non latro
Res miranda populo

Translation:

St Ivo was a Breton,
A lawyer and not a thief;
A wonderful thing for the people to set eyes on

Ivo was canonized in June 1347 by Clement VI at the urging of Philip I, Duke of Burgundy. At the inquest into his sanctity in 1331, many of his parishioners testified as to his goodness, that he preached regularly in both chapel and field, and that under him "the people of the land became twice as good as they had been before". The connection between religion and good behaviour was especially stressed in his sermons.

Shortly after 1362, the future saint Jeanne-Marie de Maillé reported a vision of Yves (and an ecstasy, raptus), during which he told her, "If you are willing to abandon the world, you will taste here on earth the joys of heaven."

Ivo is often represented with a purse in his right hand (for all the money he gave to the poor during his life) and a rolled paper in the other hand (for his charge as a judge). Another popular representation of Ivo is between a rich man and a poor one. The churches of Sant'Ivo alla Sapienza and Sant'Ivo dei Bretoni in Rome are dedicated to him.

== See also ==
- Statue of Ivo of Kermartin, Charles Bridge

== General and cited references ==
- His vita is in the Acta Sanctorum, col. 735.
- Vauchez, André (1993). Daniel E. Bornstein (ed.). The Laity in the Middle Ages: Religious Beliefs and Devotional Practices. Translated by Margery J. Schneider. Notre Dame: University of Notre Dame Press..
