= Statue of Saint Ludmila, Charles Bridge =

Statue in Prague, Czech Republic

Coordinates: 50°05′12″N 14°24′37″E

Statue of Saint Ludmila
- Socha svaté Ludmily (Czech)
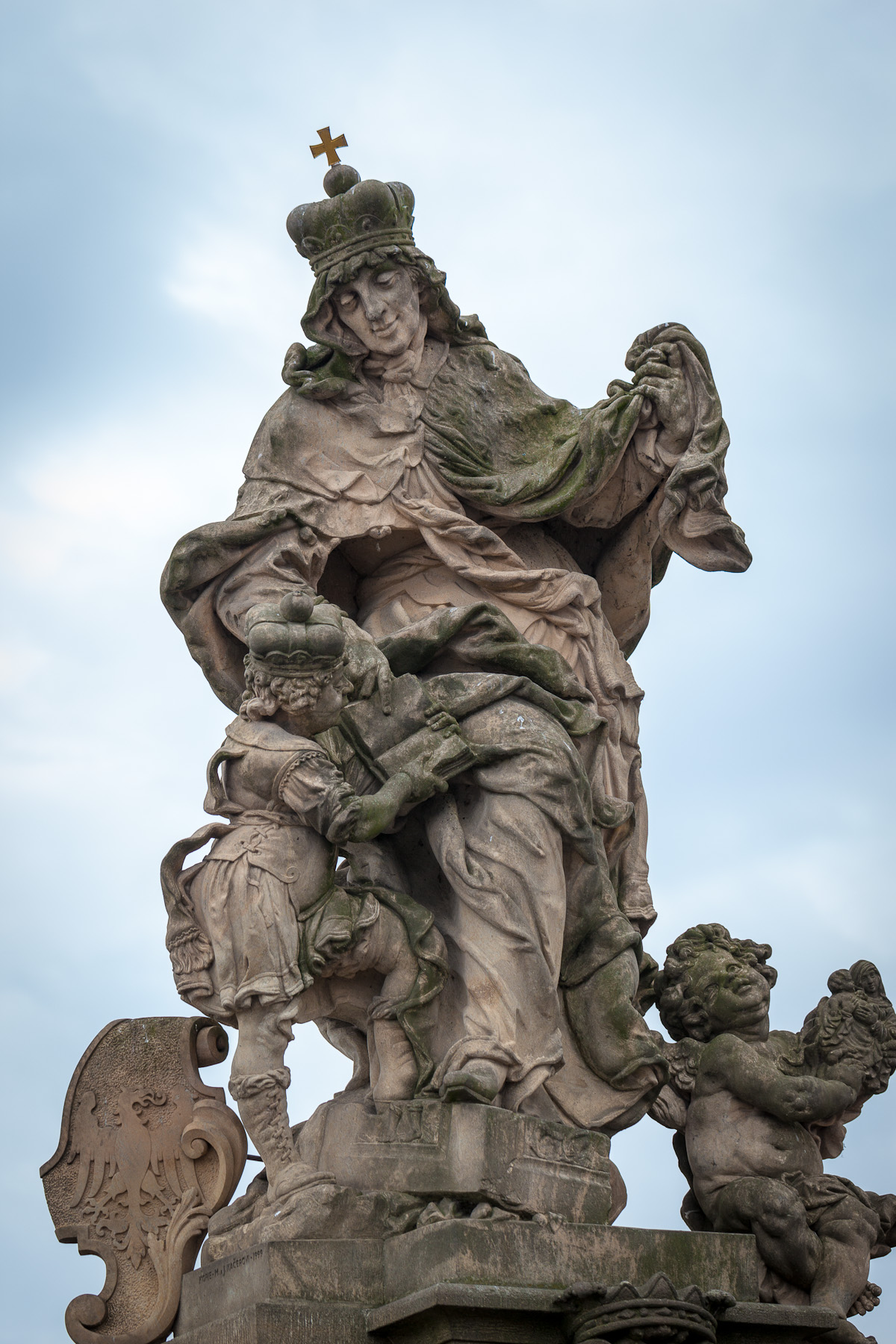
- The statue in 2012
- Artist: Matthias Braun
- Subject: Ludmila of Bohemia
- Location: Prague, Czech Republic

A statue of Saint Ludmila (Czech: Socha svaté Ludmily) by Matthias Braun is installed on the south side of the Charles Bridge in Prague, Czech Republic.
