= Awirs =

Village and municipal district in Belgium

Coordinates: 50°36′N 5°24′E

Awirs Les Awires (Walloon)
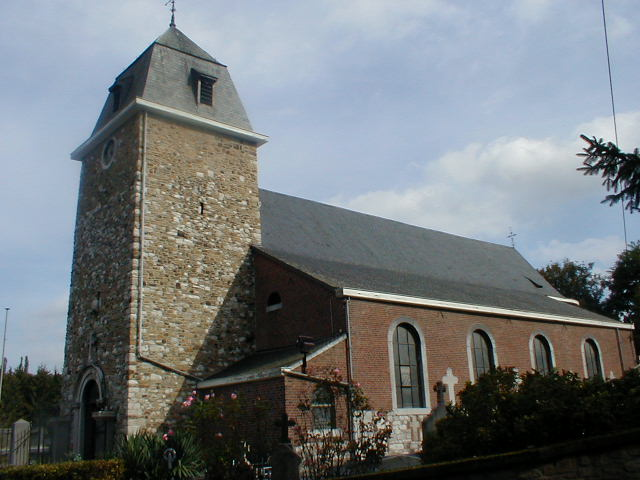
- Church in Awirs

- Location within Belgium
- Country: Belgium
- Region: Wallonia
- Province: Liège
- Municipality: Flémalle

Population (2004-12-31)
  - Total: 2,869
- Time zone: UTC+1
  - Summer (DST): UTC+2
- Postal code: 4400

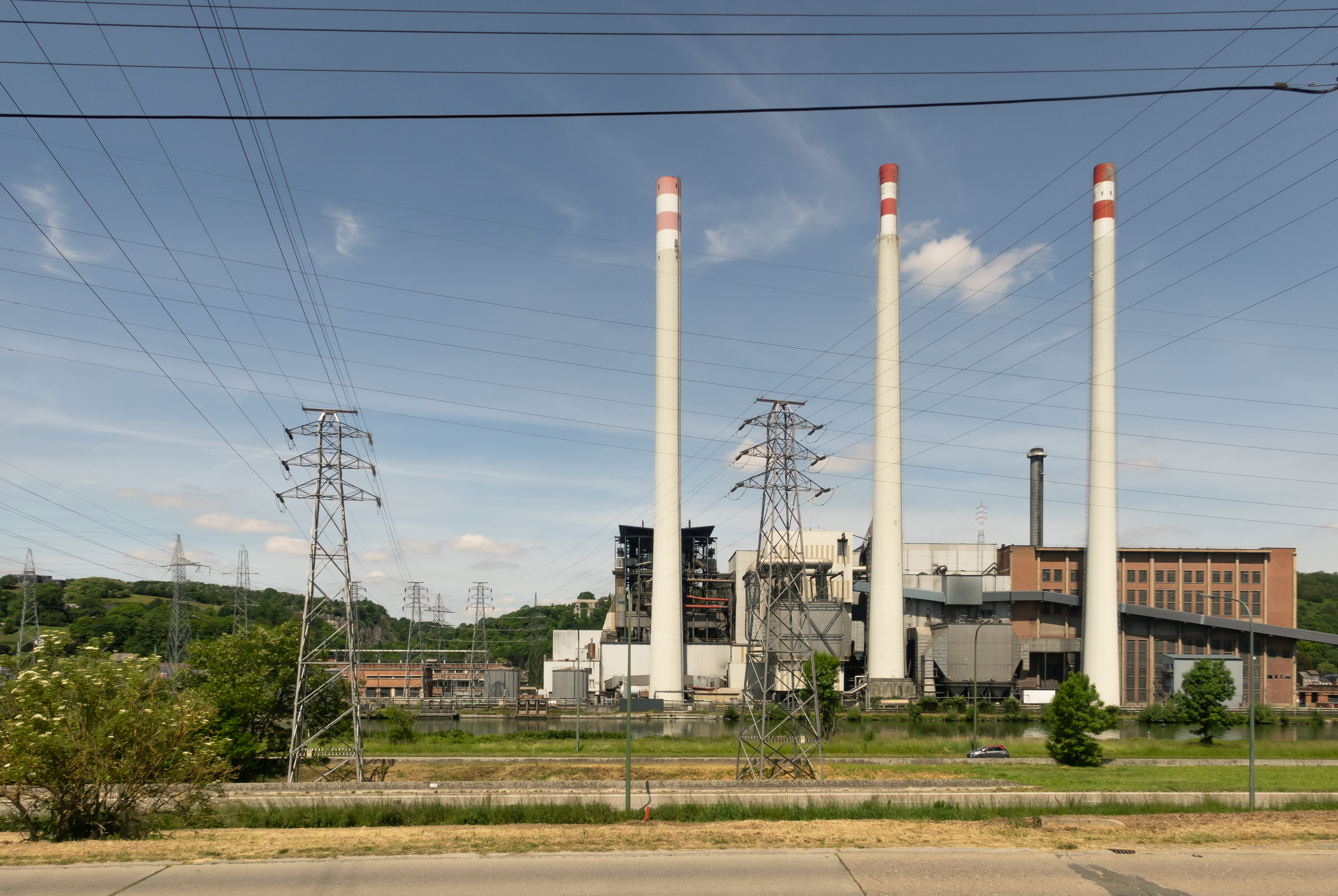
Former coal plant (currently on biomass)

Awirs (Walloon: Les Awires, also Aywières) is a village of Wallonia and a district of the municipality of Flémalle, located in the province of Liège, Belgium.

The population on 31 December 2004 was 2,869.

A notable building is the 18th century Château d'Aigremont. A Neanderthal skull, Engis 2, was found in the Schmerling Caves. The Flemish saint Lutgardis (1182-1246) is associated with Aywières.
