= Jeanne-Marie de Maille =

French saint

Blessed Jeanne-Marie de Maille TOSF
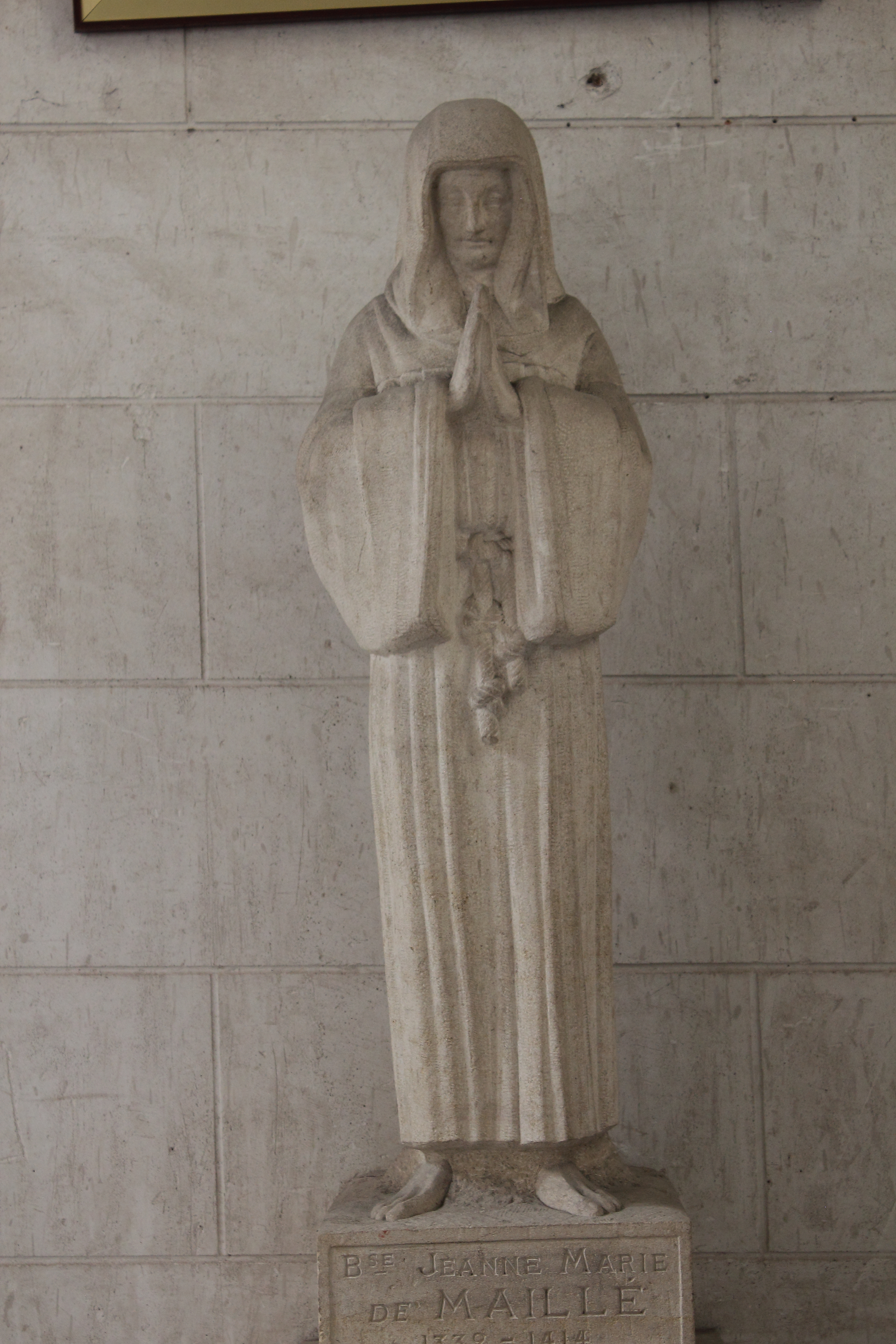
- Born: 14 April 1331; Saint-Quentin, Kingdom of France
- Died: 28 March 1414 (aged 82); Tours, Kingdom of France
- Venerated in: Roman Catholic Church
- Beatified: 27 April 1871, Saint Peter's Basilica, Kingdom of Italy by Pope Pius IX
- Feast: 28 March

Jeanne-Marie de Maille (14 April 1331 − 28 March 1414) was a French Roman Catholic anchoress and a member of the Third Order of Saint Francis. Jeanne-Marie was born into a noble family, and married a nobleman herself, though she remained childless as a result of her chaste life. She and her husband lived together until his death in 1363. Subsequently, Jeanne-Marie became an anchoress at a church where she was characterised by humility and holiness. Pope Pius IX confirmed her beatification on 27 April 1871.

== Life ==
Jeanne de Maille was born on 14 April 1331 as the last of three children to Hardouin I de Maille (1285–1340) and Jeanne de Montbazon (c. 1305–53) in Saint-Quentin in the Kingdom of France at their castle of La Roche. Her elder siblings were Hardouin II (1330–81) and Isabeau (c. 1325–64). The Madonna inspired her as a child that led her to lead a pious childhood; her father died in 1340 and so she lived with her grandfather after this. Her additional name Marie was added to her birth name at her Confirmation due to her devotion to the Mother of God.

Her grandfather chose a man for her to wed: the baron Robert de Sillé. She consented having failed to secure her grandfather's permission for her to join a convent. Her grandfather died during the 1347 wedding and Maille decided to dedicate herself to God which her husband did not oppose. Together they feed the poor and care for the sick. Roberto was captured at the Battle of Crécy and she sold all of her possessions to draw up the 3000 florin ransom but he escaped and returned home before she could send it to his captors.

Robert II died from injuries sustained in a battle between the French and the English on 21 January 1353 and she became a nurse to help the ill and poor despite losing all she had. Her in-laws were unkind to her and blamed her for her husband squandering his fortune for charitable ends and so deprived her of her widow's inheritance and cut ties with her. She first went to seek shelter at the home of an old servant of hers but the servant treated her with harshness when realizing she was poor; she went to reside with her mother but left when the latter tried to pressure her into finding another husband. She also had a vision of Saint Ivo of Kermartin who told her that she should live in the world in a spirit of faith. Maille became a member of the Third Order of Saint Francis and in 1388 moved into a small room at a church in Tours. Maille was once in the church at Tours when a madwoman threw a stone at her that injured her back. Maille rallied from this but the scar never quite healed.

Maille died on 28 March 1414 and her remains were clothed in the religious habit of a Franciscan tertiary for her burial. Since she enjoyed great popularity as an advisor during her lifetime, her grave became a place of pilgrimage. Pope Pius IX beatified her on 27 April 1871 in Saint Peter's Basilica.
