= Statue of Lutgardis, Charles Bridge =

Statue in Prague, Czech Republic

Dream of Saint Lutgardis
- Sousoší Sen svaté Luitgardy (Czech)
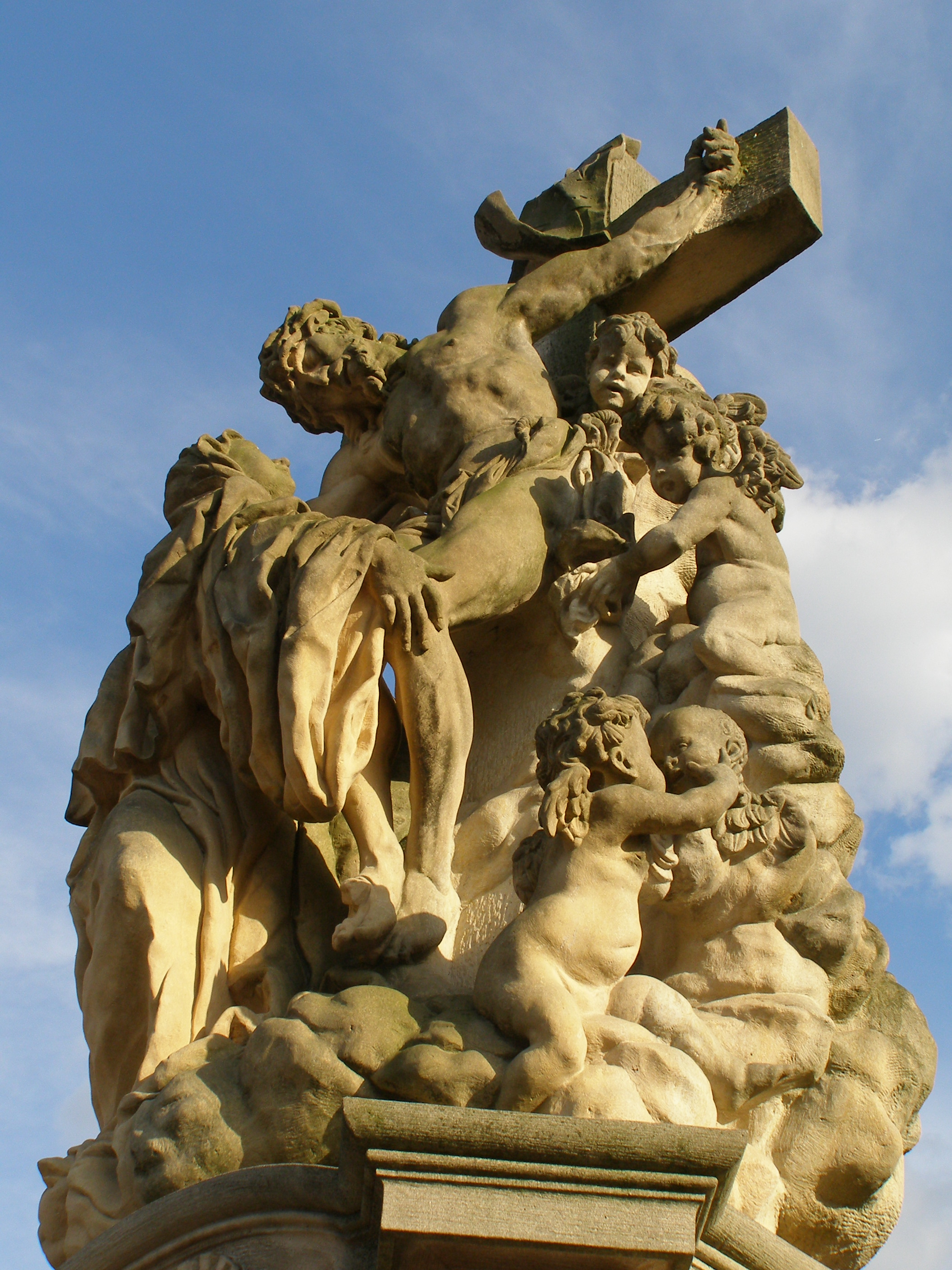
- The statue in 2012
- Artist: Matthias Braun
- Type: Sculpture
- Subject: Lutgardis
- Location: Prague, Czech Republic; 50.0869°N 14.4085°E

A statue of Saint Lutgardis (Czech: Sousoší Sen svaté Luitgardy) by Matthias Braun is installed on the south side of the Charles Bridge in Prague, Czech Republic.
