= Ittre =

Municipality in Walloon Brabant province, Wallonia, Belgium

- Municipality
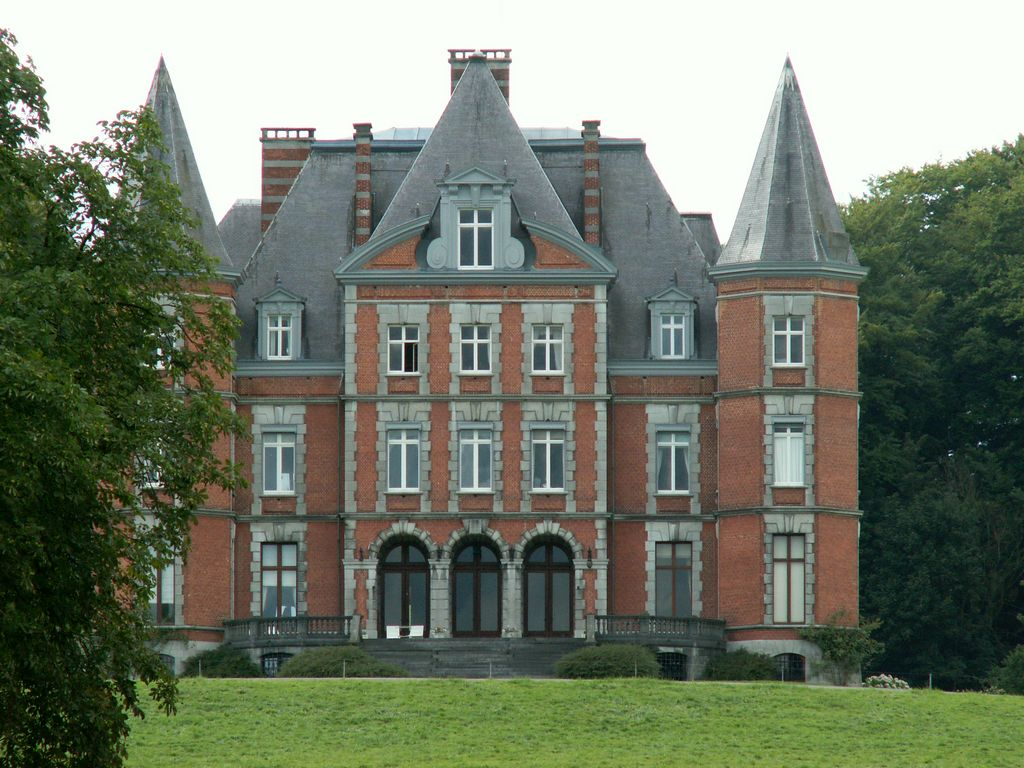
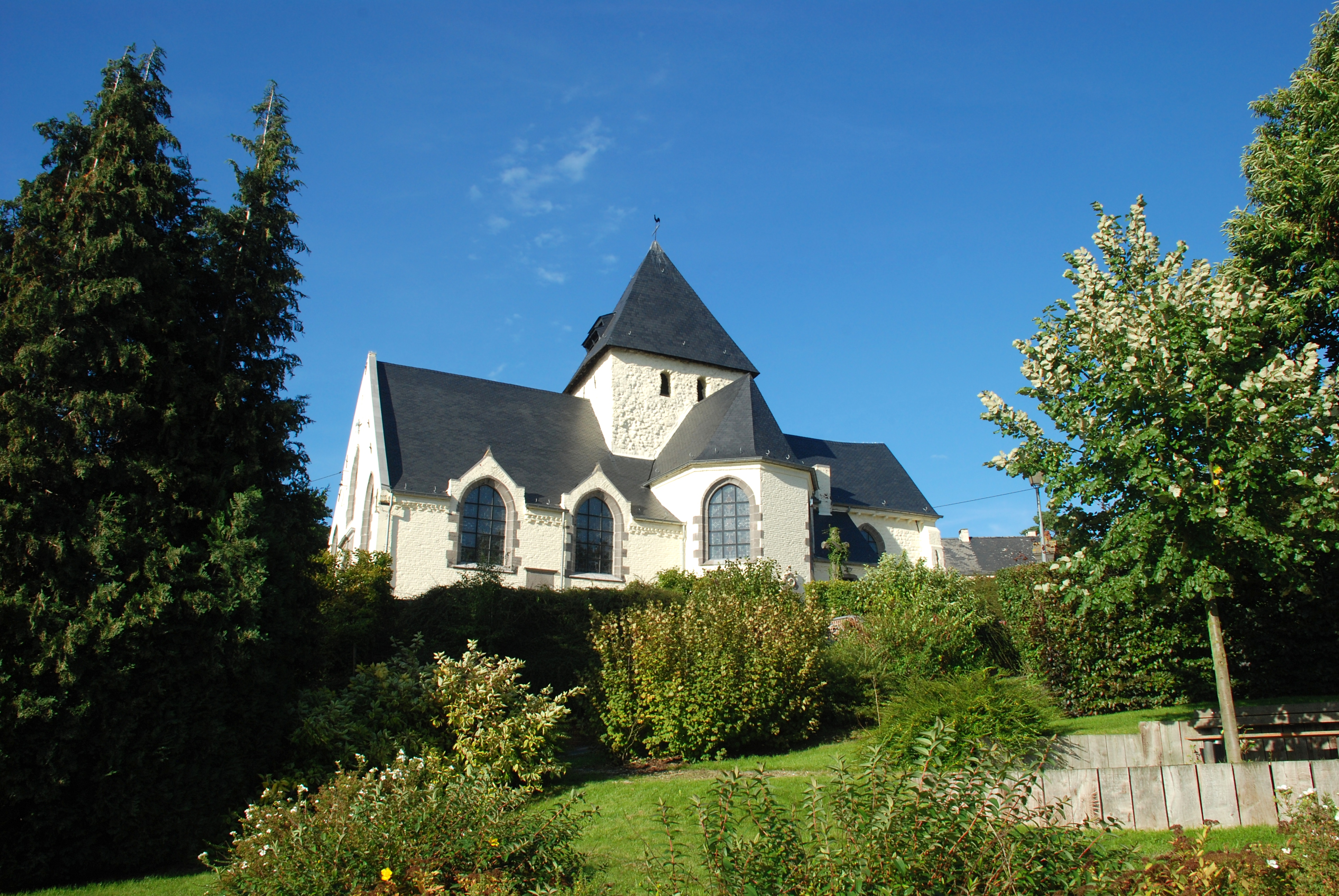
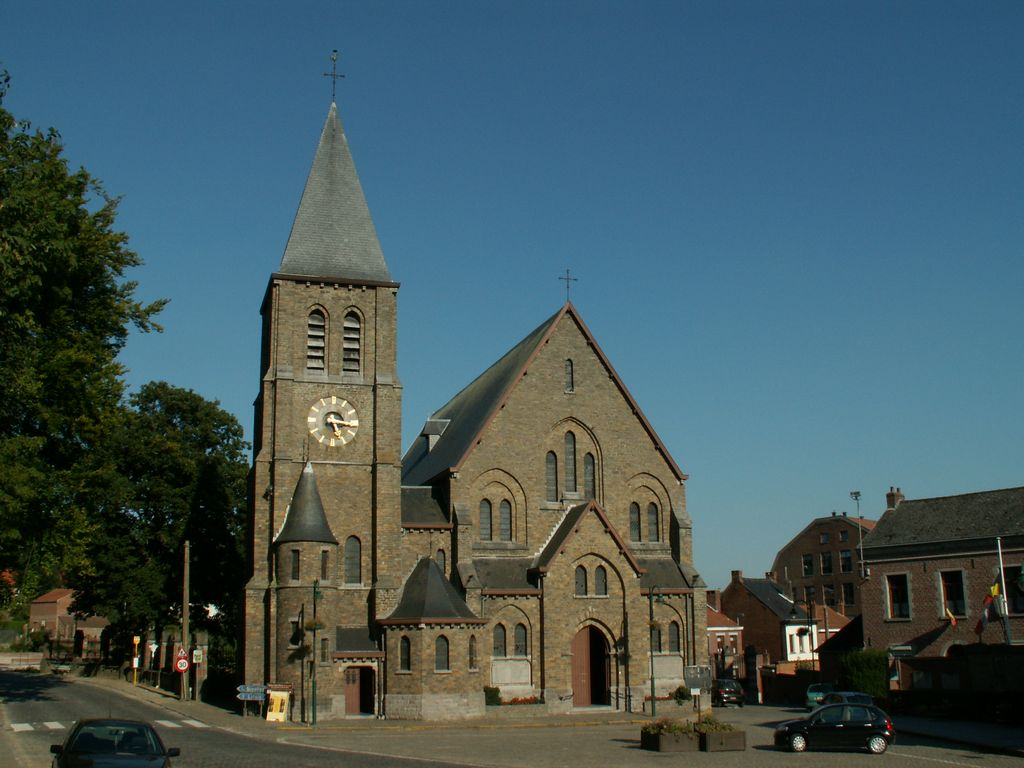
- From top to bottom, Ittre's castle, Saint-Lawrence Church and Saint-Remigius Church

- Flag Coat of arms

- The municipality of Ittre in Walloon Brabant
- Interactive map of Ittre
- Location in Belgium
- Coordinates: 50°39′N 04°16′E
- Country: Belgium
- Community: French Community
- Region: Wallonia
- Province: Walloon Brabant
- Arrondissement: Nivelles

Government
  - Mayor: Christian Fayt (PS)
  - Governing party: En semble Pour Ittre (EPI) - MR

Area
  - Total: 35.03 km^{2} (13.53 sq mi)

Population (2018-01-01)
  - Total: 6,865
  - Density: 196.0/km^{2} (507.6/sq mi)
- Demonym: Ittrois(e)
- Postal codes: Ittre (1460); Virginal (1460); Haut-Ittre (1461)
- NIS code: 25044
- Area codes: 067
- Website: www.ittre.be

Ittre (French pronunciation: [itʁ]; Walloon: Ite; Dutch: Itter, Dutch pronunciation: [ˈɪtər]) is a municipality of Wallonia located in the Belgian province of Walloon Brabant. Since the fusion of the Belgian municipalities in 1977, the municipality is composed of three districts: Haut-Ittre, Ittre and Virginal-Samme.

Ittre was the geographical center of Belgium until World War I. The geographical center was moved to Walhain due to the allocation of the East Cantons (Eupen-Malmédy) to Belgium (Treaty of Versailles).

== History ==
Traditions mention the existence of the village of Ittre about the year 640, although the name is first documented in 877. But the site was already occupied in the Roman period and even in the Neolithic era.

Haut-Ittre (literally High-Ittre) is the name given to the village overlooking Ittre. Virginal would take its name from "Versus Altum", name given by the Gallo-Romans because of its culminating situation.

Its territory, after having belonged to Nivelles Abbey, was divided into several seigniories, Ittre and Fauquez being the most significant, the lords of which were in constant conflict over their jurisdiction, sovereignty and precedence in the territory and in the church of Ittre. These disputes ended only at the beginning of the 18th century. Among the most significant families in the seigniory of Ittre were those of Ittre, Rifflart and Trazegnies d'Ittre, and in Fauquez, the families of Ittre, Enghien, Fauquez and Herzelles. Fauquez and Ittre both furnished titles to marquisates, in 1689 and 1703 respectively.

The commune was connected with a number of notable persons, including Ambroise-Joseph de Herzelles, third marquis de Fauquez, whom the Empress Maria-Theresa appointed Superintendent and General Manager of the Finances and Domains of the Netherlands.

== Religion ==
The foundation of the church of Ittre occurred around 640, and is principally known as the centre of the veneration of Our Lady of Ittre, which began in 1336, when a terrible plague was raging in the Low Countries. The statue of the Virgin, from the monastery at Bois-Seigneur-Isaac, was carried in procession from village to village and on her arrival in Ittre, the plague stopped. The inhabitants refused to return it to Bois-Seigneur-Isaac, and the Virgin remained in Ittre, despite subsequent litigation, in which the ecclesiastical courts always supported the church of Ittre. An annual procession was established in 1384 and has been held every year without interruption since then on August 15. Our Lady of Ittre was especially invoked against hernias or ruptures.

Saint Lutgarde has also been venerated in Ittre since the nuns of Aywiers Abbey, forced out by the French Revolution, found refuge in the Château de Fauquez in either 1796 or 1804. They brought with them the relics of Saint Lutgarde, which they gave permanently to the church of Ittre in 1819.

== Buildings ==
Ittre contains two châteaux, the Château d'Ittre and the Château de Baudémont. The much grander Château de Fauquez was destroyed in 1827 during the construction of the Brussels-Charleroi Canal.

Churches

St Remigius' Church (1896-1899: architect Clément Léonard), in Ittre. This church contains several treasures : the shrine of Saint Lutgardis of Aywières and the statue of Our Lady of Ittre.

St Lawrence's Church is a Romanesque church in Haut-Ittre. It has preserved its sandstone tower, apse and central nave from this period.

St Peter's Church in Virginal Church of St.Peter. Rebuilt in 1827 in neoclassical style, it has stained glass windows (1928) from the old glassworks of Fauquez.
