= Louannec =

Louannec Louaneg
- Commune
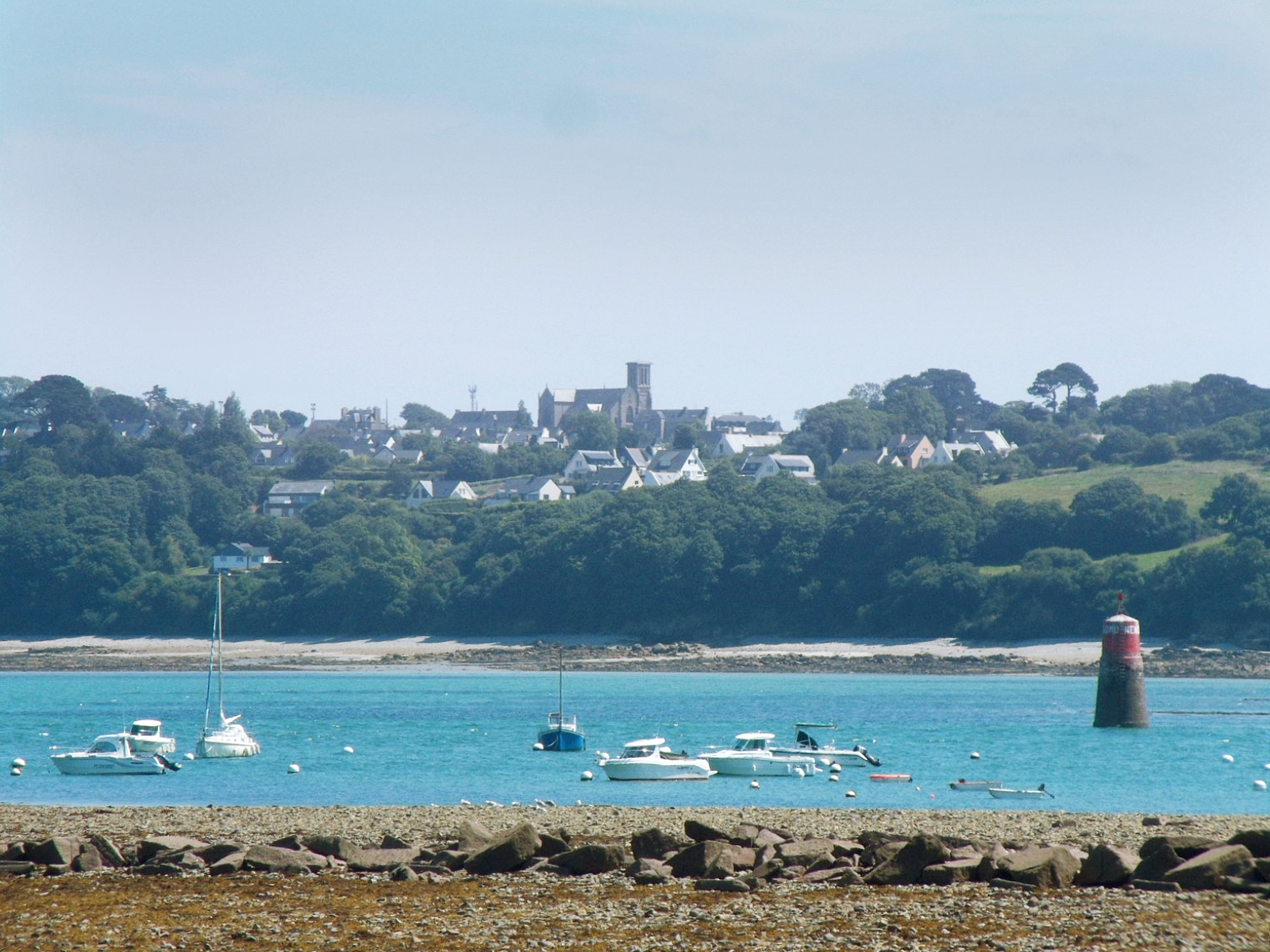
- Louannec, seen from Perros-Guirec

- Coat of arms
- Location of Louannec
- Location within France Location within Brittany
- Coordinates: 48°47′41″N 3°24′34″W
- Country: France
- Region: Brittany
- Department: Côtes-d'Armor
- Arrondissement: Lannion
- Canton: Perros-Guirec
- Intercommunality: Lannion-Trégor Communauté

Government
  - Mayor (2020–2026): Gervais Égault
- Area^{1}: 13.91 km^{2} (5.37 sq mi)
- Highest elevation: 108 m (354 ft)
- Lowest elevation: 0 m (0 ft)
- Population (2023): 3,019
  - Density: 217.0/km^{2} (562.1/sq mi)
- Time zone: UTC+01:00 (CET)
  - Summer (DST): UTC+02:00 (CEST)
- INSEE/Postal code: 22134 /22700
- ^{1} French Land Register data, which excludes lakes, ponds, glaciers > 1 km^{2} (0.386 sq mi or 247 acres) and river estuaries.

Louannec (French pronunciation: [lwanɛk]; Breton: Louaneg) is a commune in the Côtes-d'Armor department in Brittany in northwestern France.

== Population ==
The inhabitants are called louannecains in French and louanegad (Louanegiz) in Breton.

Historical population
Year	Pop.	±% p.a.
1968	1,170	—
1975	1,619	+4.75%
1982	2,191	+4.42%
1990	2,195	+0.02%
1999	2,384	+0.92%
2007	2,853	+2.27%
2012	3,020	+1.14%
2017	3,068	+0.32%
2023	3,019	−0.27%
Source: INSEE

== Breton language ==
In 2008, 5.82% of primary school children attended bilingual schools.

== Personalities ==
- Saint Ives of Helory, who died in Louannec on 19 May 1303.
- Maodez Glanndour (1909-1986), Breton-language poet.

== See also ==
- Communes of the Côtes-d'Armor department
