= Matthias Braun =

Czech sculptor

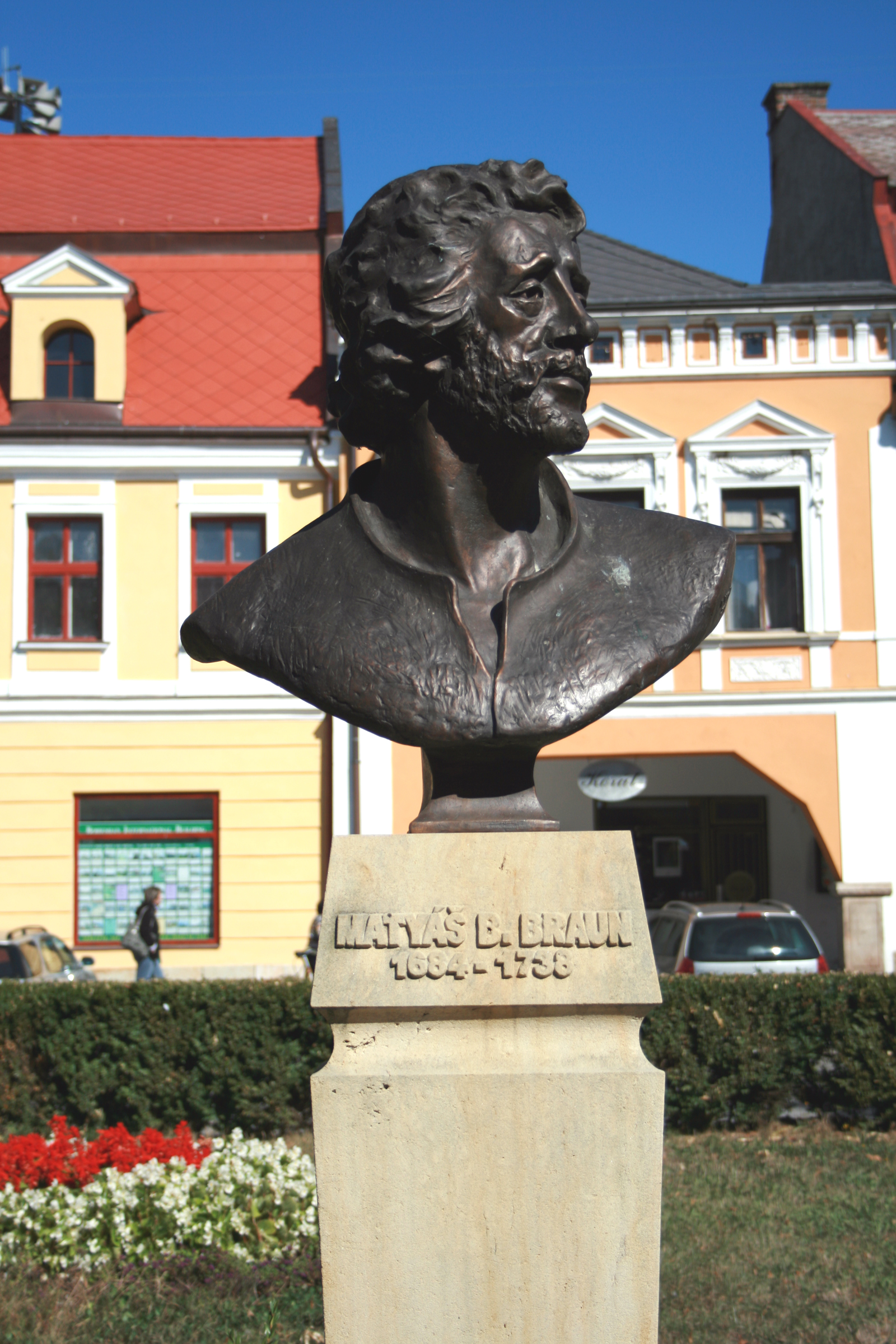
Bust of M.B.Braun in Jaroměř

Matthias Bernard Braun (Czech: Matyáš Bernard Braun, 24 February 1684 in Sautens, County of Tyrol – 15 February 1738 in Prague) was a sculptor and carver active in the Kingdom of Bohemia, one of the most prominent late baroque style sculptors in the area.

Matthias Bernard Braun was born as the fifth child of Jacob Braun and Magdalene born Neureuter. He apprenticed in the Holy Roman Empire where he was born in Salzburg, in the Republic of Venice, and in the Papal States in Bologna and Rome. In his work, it is the Italian influence, that is the most prominent. He was inspired by Michelangelo Buonarroti, Gian Lorenzo Bernini and by the Venetian sculptural school of the 17th century and thus became a great propagator of the Italian-provenience sculpture in the Central-European context.

Some time before 1710, Braun came to visit Prague (also in the Holy Roman Empire), already as a full-fledged artist creating from sandstone, and soon he became domestic in Bohemia. He found his wife and friends there, and became a citizen to the New Town of Prague. Already his first work - the statuary of the Vision of St. Luthgard (Czech: Vidění sv. Luitgardy) from 1710, situated on Charles Bridge in Prague - brought to him much attention and many new orders. Braun then was able to found the biggest workshop in Prague, employing six journeymen and having an income of 900 golden a year around 1725. Soon, he himself could not manage the number of new commissions for Prague palaces, gardens, churches and many other places in Bohemia, a situation worsened by the progressing tuberculosis. That is why he only created the designs and models, had his cooperators realize them and completed the work into the final appearance. He had five children, none of which continued his work, though. He died in Prague in 1738.

Matthias Braun is probably the most famous for his collection of the allegories of Virtues and Vices situated at the Kuks Hospital in Bohemia, a commission of count František Antonín Špork. Other notable sculptures include: the Bethlehem - monumental statues chiselled directly in sandstone rocks near Kuks, forty pitoresque statues of dwarfs at the Kuks race-course, several statuaries at Charles Bridge in Prague, statues in St. Kliment's Church in Prague, the stone pillar of the Holy Trinity in Teplice, the sculptures in the interior of Czernin palace (Prague), and many others.

There is an asteroid named Mathiasbraun (number 6768), discovered in 1983.

== See also ==
- Statue of Ivo of Kermartin, Charles Bridge
- Statue of Saint Ludmila, Charles Bridge

== Books about Braun ==
- Neumann, Jaromír: Český barok. Praha: Odeon 1968, 2.vyd. 1975
- Poche, Emanuel: Matyáš Bernard Braun, sochař českého baroka a jeho dílna. Praha: Odeon 1986
- Blažíček, Oldřich J.: Sochařství vrcholného baroka v Čechách, v: Dějiny českého výtvarného umění, díl II/2. Praha 1989
- Kořán, Ivo: Karlův most. Praha: Odeon 1989.
- Hoferica, Jilji: 3x Mathias Bernard Braun. Praha 2012
- Hoferica Jilji: Mathias Braun a Georg Patzak. Praha 2013
- Kdo byl kdo v našich dějinách do roku 1918 / (Pavel Augusta … et al.) (4 ed.). Praha: Libri. 1999. p. 49. ISBN 80-85983-94-X.
