= Tuileries Garden =

Public garden in Paris, France

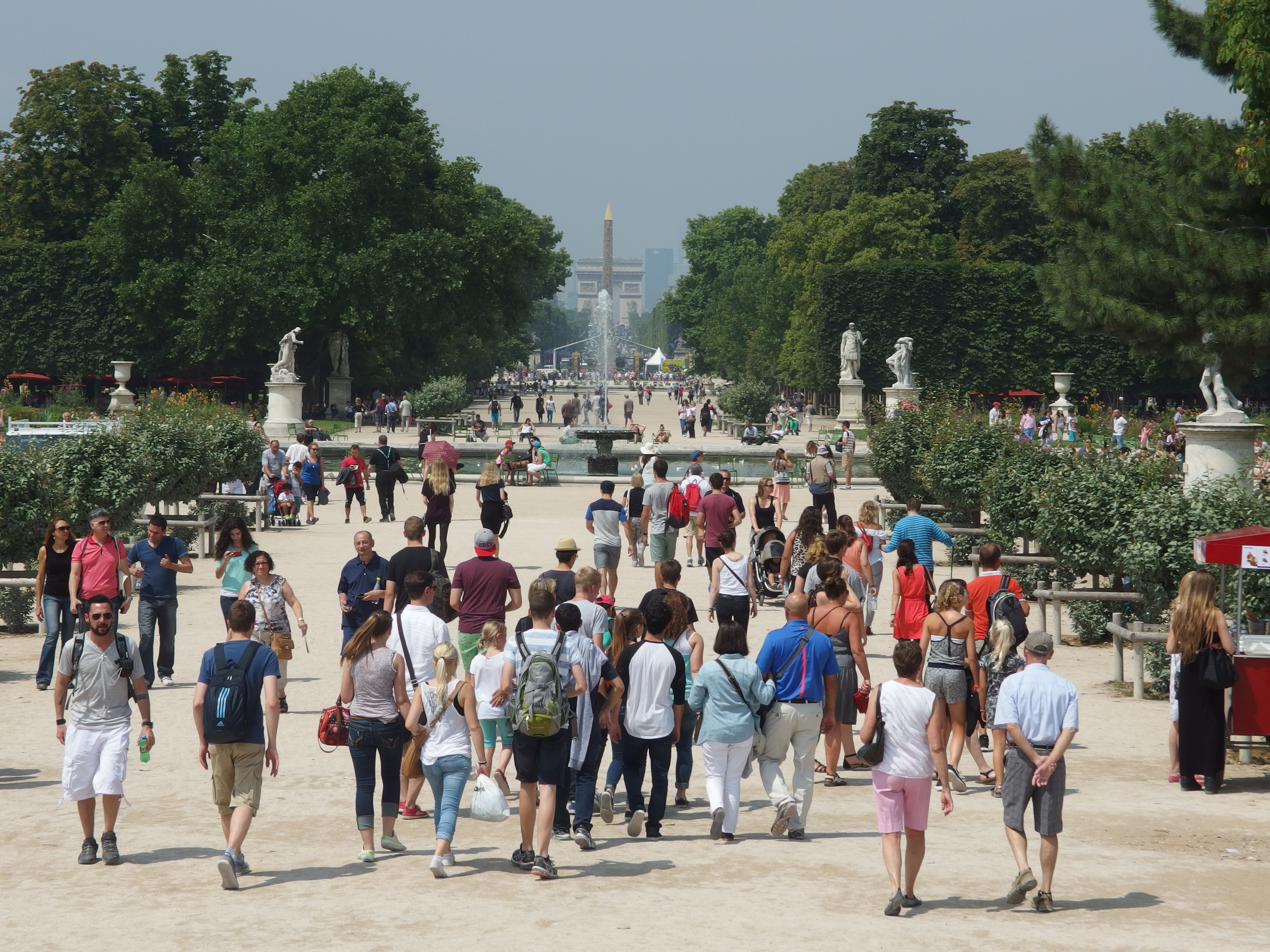
- Grande Allée of the Tuileries Garden, looking towards the Place de la Concorde and the Arc de Triomphe
- Interactive map of Tuileries Garden
- Type: Urban park
- Location: Paris, France
- Coordinates: 48°51′50″N 2°19′34″E
- Area: 25.5 hectares (63 acres)
- Founder: Catherine de' Medici
- Open: 1667

The Tuileries Garden (French: Jardin des Tuileries, IPA: [ʒaʁdɛ̃ de tɥilʁi]) is a public garden between the Louvre and the Place de la Concorde in the 1st arrondissement of Paris, France. Created by Catherine de' Medici as the garden of the Tuileries Palace in 1564, it was opened to the public in 1667 and became a public park after the French Revolution. Since the 19th century, it has been a place for Parisians to celebrate, meet, stroll and relax. After the demolition of the main block of the Tuileries Palace in the 1880s, the gardens expanded into the Place du Carrousel, the palace's former internal courtyard (Cour du Carrousel). Covering an area of 25.5 hectares (63 acres), it is one of the most iconic parks in Paris. During the 2024 Summer Olympics and Paralympics, it was the site of the Olympic and Paralympic cauldron.

== History ==
=== The Italian Garden of Catherine de' Medici (16th century) ===
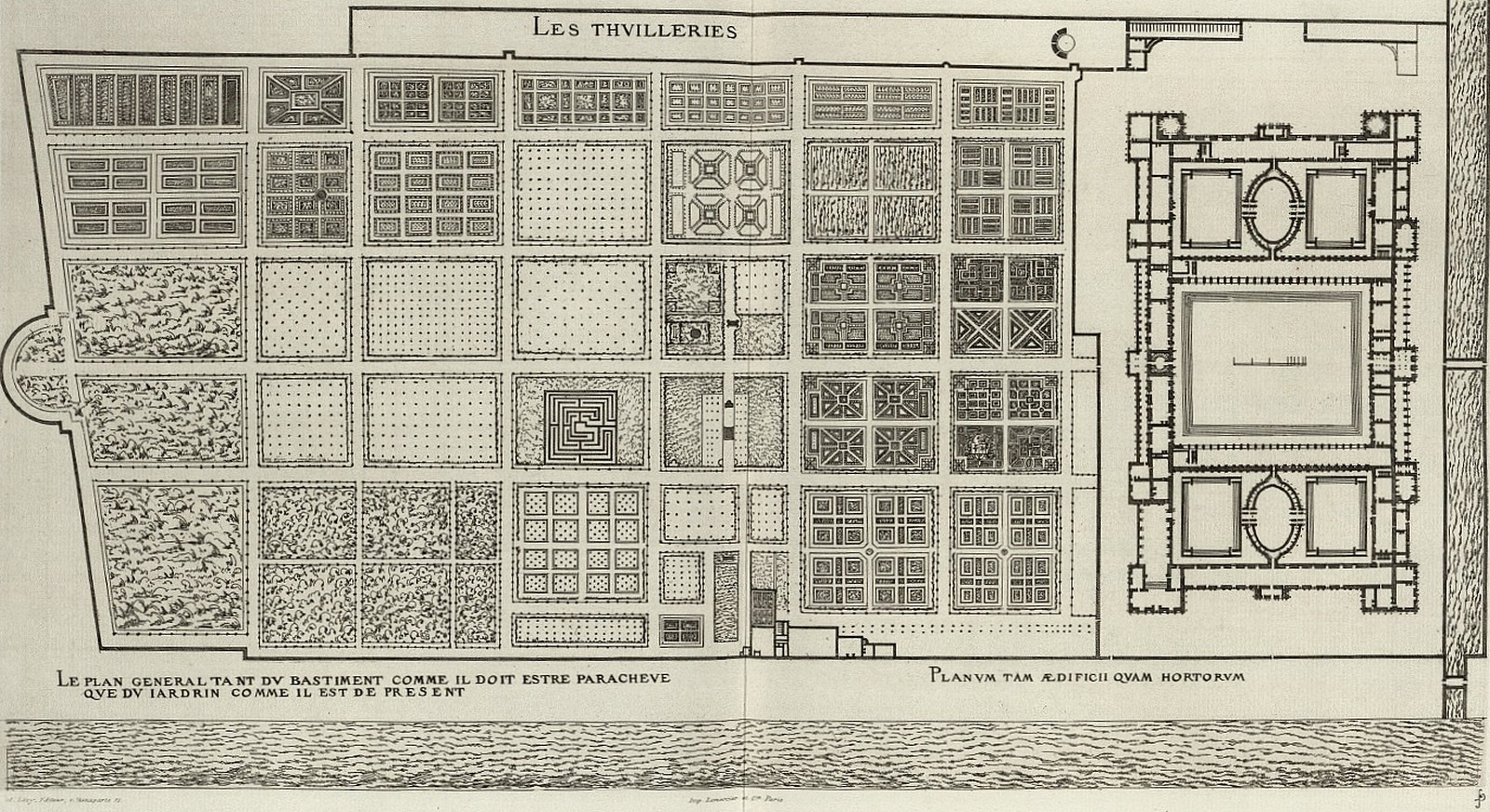
Plan for the palace and gardens by Jacques I Androuet du Cerceau, 1576–1579

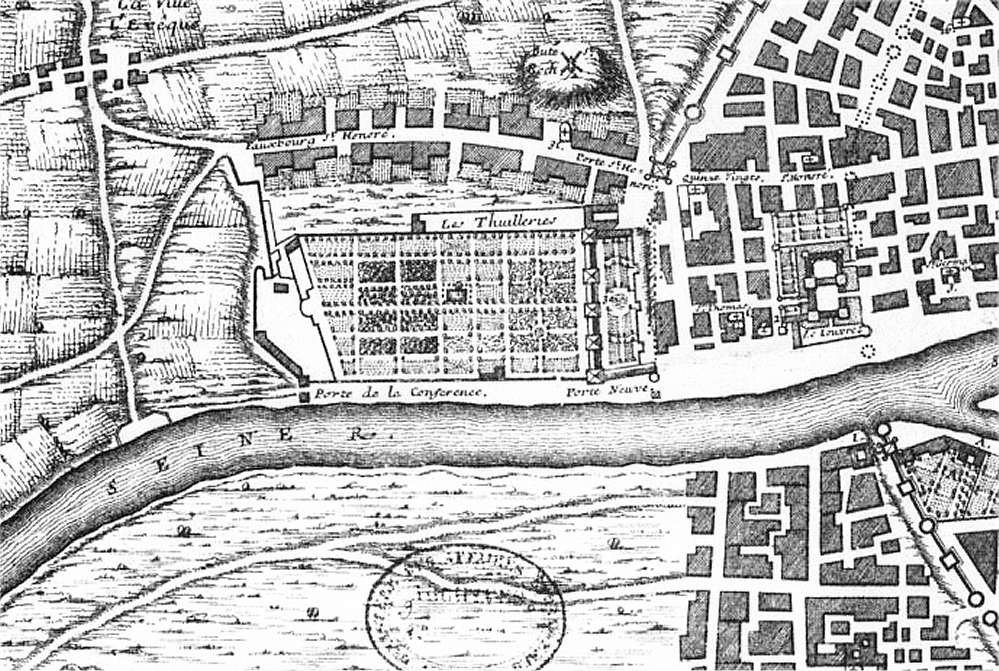
Plan of the Tuileries garden in about 1589. The Louvre is to the right

In July 1559, after the accidental death of her husband, Henry II, Queen Catherine de' Medici decided to leave her residence of the Hôtel des Tournelles, at the eastern part of Paris, near the Bastille. Together with her son, the new king of France Francis II, her other children and the royal court, she moved to the Louvre Palace. Five years later, in 1564, she decided to build a new residence with more space for a garden. For that purpose, Catherine bought land west of Paris, just outside the city Wall of Charles V. It was bordered on the south by the Seine, and on the north by the faubourg Saint-Honoré, a road in the countryside continuing the Rue Saint-Honoré. Since the 13th century this area had been occupied by tile-making factories called tuileries (from the French tuile, meaning "tile"). The new residence was called the Tuileries Palace.

Catherine commissioned a landscape architect from Florence, Bernard de Carnesse, to create an Italian Renaissance garden for the palace. The new garden was an enclosed space five hundred metres long and three hundred metres wide, separated from the new palace by a lane. It was divided into rectangular compartments by six alleys, and the sections were planted with lawns, flower beds, and small clusters of five trees, called quinconces; and, more practically, with kitchen gardens and vineyards. It was further decorated with fountains, a labyrinth, a grotto, and faience images of plants and animals, made by Bernard Palissy, whom Catherine had tasked to discover the secret of Chinese porcelain.

The development of the garden was interrupted by a civil war. In 1588 Henry III had to flee through the garden to escape capture from the Catholic League on the Day of the Barricades of the French Wars of Religion and did not return. The gardens were pillaged. However, the new king, Henry IV, returned in 1595 and, with his chief landscape gardener Claude Mollet, restored and embellished the gardens. Henry built a chamille, or covered arbor, the length of the garden, Another alley was planted with mulberry trees where he hoped to cultivate silkworms and start a silk industry in France. He also built a rectangular ornamental lake of 65 metres by 45 metres with a fountain supplied with water by the new pump called La Samaritaine, which had been built in 1608 on the Pont Neuf. The area between the palace and the former moat of Charles V was turned into the "New Garden" (Jardin Neuf) with a large fountain in the center. Though Henry IV never lived in the Tuileries Palace, which was continually under reconstruction, he did use the gardens for relaxation and exercise.

=== Garden of Louis XIII and Louis XIV – The French formal garden (17th century) ===
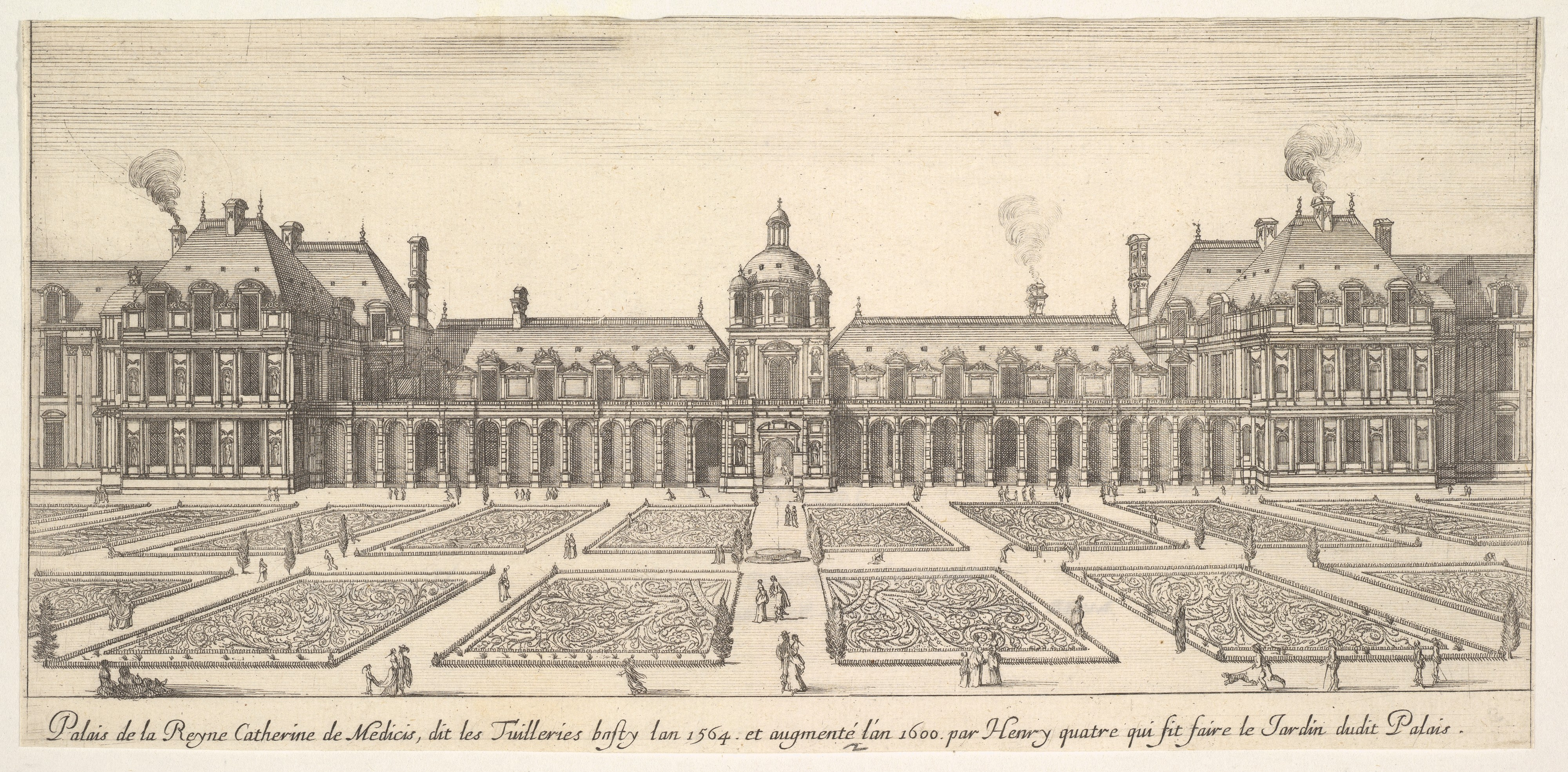
Garden of Louis XIII in 1649–51

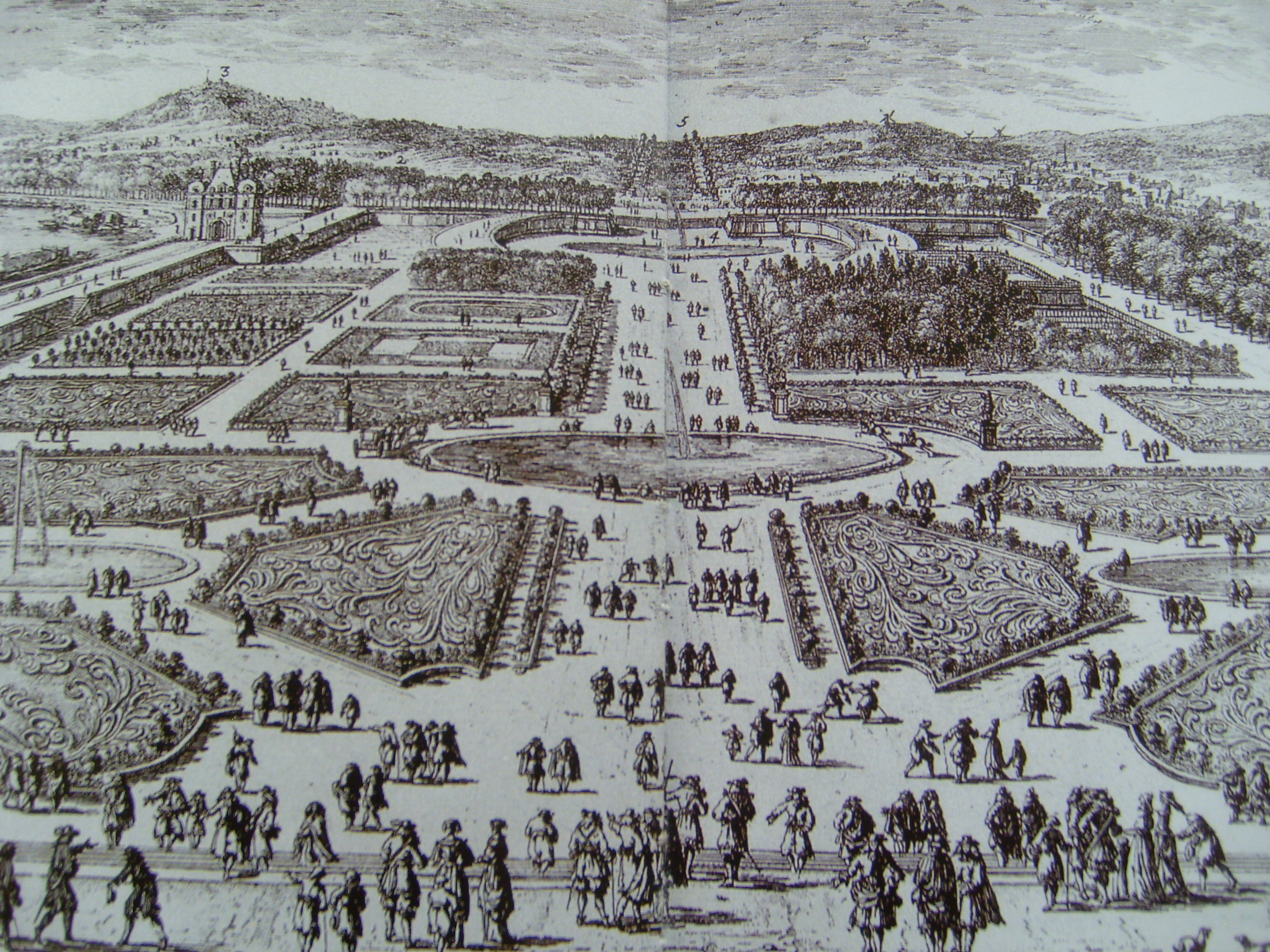
Tuileries Garden of Le Nôtre in the 17th century, looking west toward the future Champs-Élysées, engraving by Gabriel Perelle

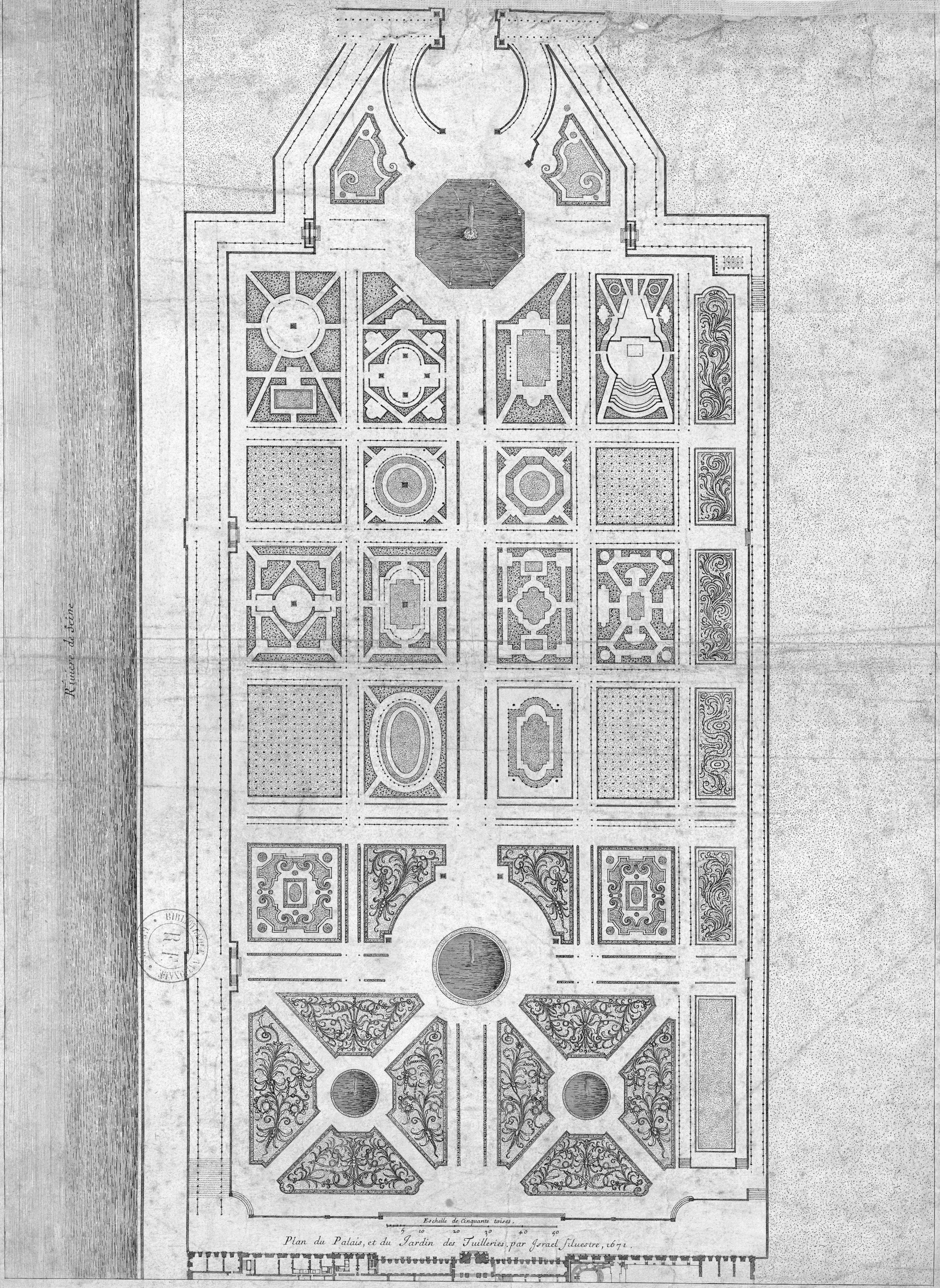
Le Nôtre's Tuileries Garden plan, engraving by Israël Silvestre, 1671

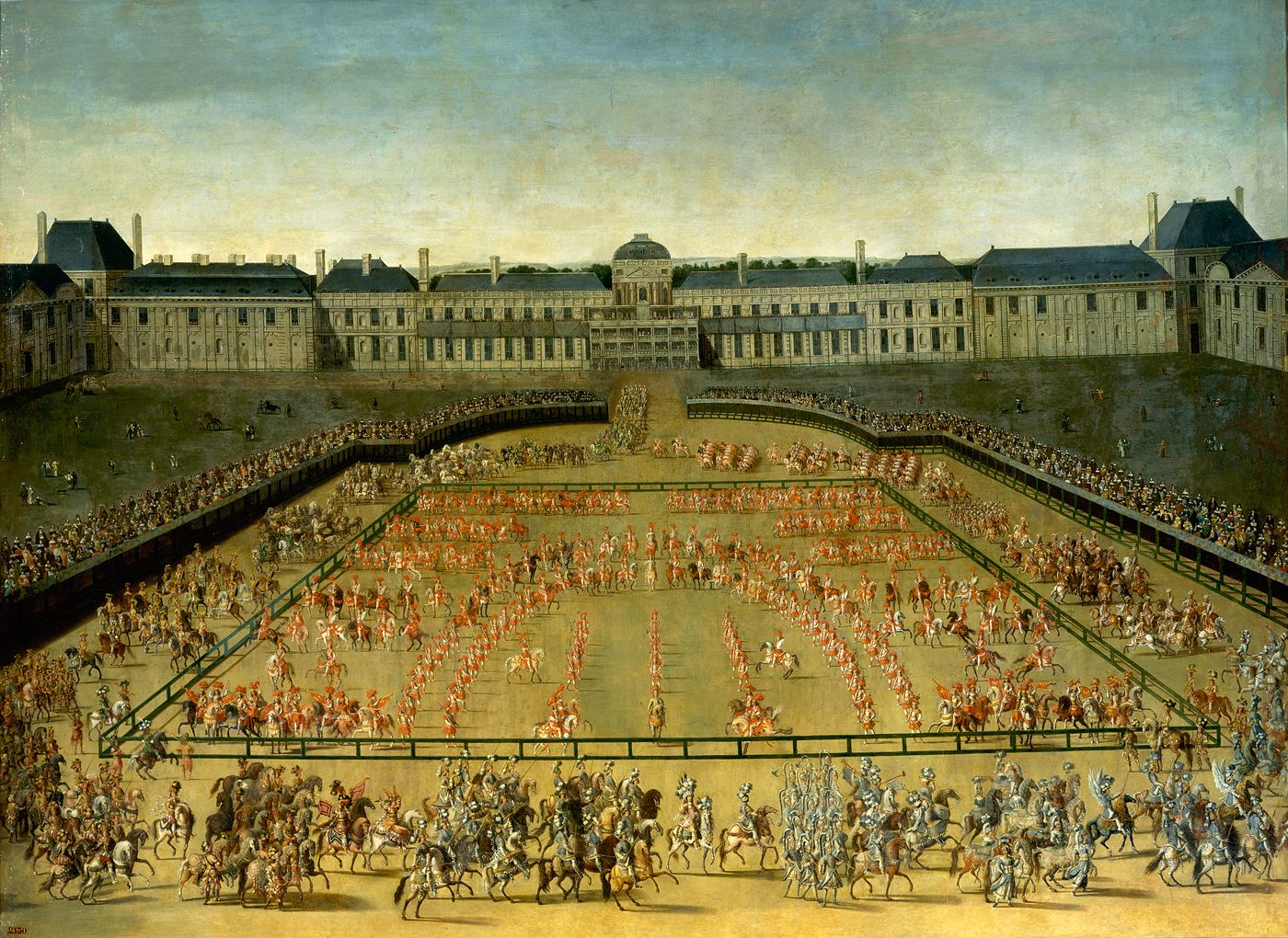
The Carrousel of 5–6 June 1662 at the Tuileries, celebrating the birth of Louis XIV's son and heir

After the assassination of his father in 1610, Louis XIII, age nine, became the new owner of the Tuileries Gardens. It became his enormous playground - he used it for hunting, and he kept a small zoo of exotic animals. On the north side of the gardens, his mother and the regent, Marie de' Medici, built stables and a riding school, the Manége, which survived until the French Revolution, when it was used as the meeting hall of the revolutionary parliament.

The garden was entirely enclosed, and was used exclusively by the royal family when they were in residence, but When the king and court were absent from Paris, the gardens were turned into a pleasure spot for the nobility. In 1630 a parterre at the west end of the garden, between the Louvre and the Tuileries Palace, where the moat of the old city walls had been, was turned into a parterre of flower beds and paths. This parterre was transformed into a sort of a playground for the aristocracy. The daughter of Gaston, Duke of Orléans and the niece of Louis XIII, known as La Grande Mademoiselle, held court there, and it became known as known the "Parterre de Mademoiselle". However, in 1652, "La Grande Mademoiselle" was expelled from the palace and garden for having supported an uprising, the Fronde, against her cousin, the young Louis XIV. Louis XIV had the space transformed into large parade ground, When his first child was born, on 5–6 Jun 1662, the parterre was the setting for a spectacular circular horseback promenade by the nobility, slowly circling the parterre. This became known as a "Carrousel", and gave its name to that portion of the garden.

Louis XIV quickly imposed his own sense of order on the Tuileries Garden. His architects, Louis Le Vau and François d'Orbay, finally finished the Tuileries Palace, making a proper royal residence. In 1664, Colbert, the King's superintendent of buildings, commissioned the landscape architect André Le Nôtre, to redesign the entire garden. Le Nôtre was the grandson of Pierre Le Nôtre, one of Catherine de' Medici's gardeners, and his father Jean had also been a gardener at the Tuileries. He immediately began transforming the Tuileries into a formal jardin à la française, a style he had first developed at Vaux-le-Vicomte and perfected at Versailles, based on symmetry, order and long perspectives.

Le Nôtre's gardens were designed to be seen from above, from a building or terrace. He eliminated the street which separated the palace and the garden, and replaced it with a terrace looking down upon flowerbeds bordered by low boxwood hedges and filled with designs of flowers. In the centre of the flowerbeds he placed three ornamental lakes with fountains. In front of the centre of the first fountain he laid out the Grande Allée, which extended 350 metres. He built two other alleys, lined with chestnut trees, on either side. He crossed these three main alleys with small lanes, to create compartments planted with diverse trees, shrubs and flowers.

On the south side of the park, next to the Seine, he built a long terrace called the Terrasse du bord-de-l'eau, planted with trees, with a view of the river. He built a second terrace on the north side, overlooking the garden, called the Terrasse des Feuillants.

On the west side of the garden, beside the present-day Place de la Concorde, he built two ramps in a horseshoe shape Fer à Cheval and two terraces overlooking an octagonal lake Bassin Octogonal 60 m (200 ft) in diameter, respectively 70 m (230 ft) from corner to corner, with one fountain in the centre with a waterjet of 12 m (39 ft) height, additional powerful waterjets from each corner to the center. The terraces frame the western entrance of the garden, and provide another viewpoint to see the garden from above.

Le Nôtre wanted his grand perspective from the palace to the western end of the garden to continue outside the garden. In 1667, he made plans for an avenue with two rows of trees on either side, which would have continued west to the present Rond-Point des Champs-Élysées.

Le Nôtre and his hundreds of masons, gardeners and earth-movers worked on the gardens from 1666 to 1672. In 1682, however, the King, furious with the Parisians for resisting his authority, abandoned Paris and moved to Versailles.

In 1667, at the request of the famous author of Sleeping Beauty and other fairy tales, Charles Perrault, the Tuileries Garden was opened to the public, with the exception of beggars, "lackeys" and soldiers. It was the first royal garden to be open to the public.

=== Louis XV and Louis XVI – balloon flights, an invasion, and revolutionary ceremonies ===
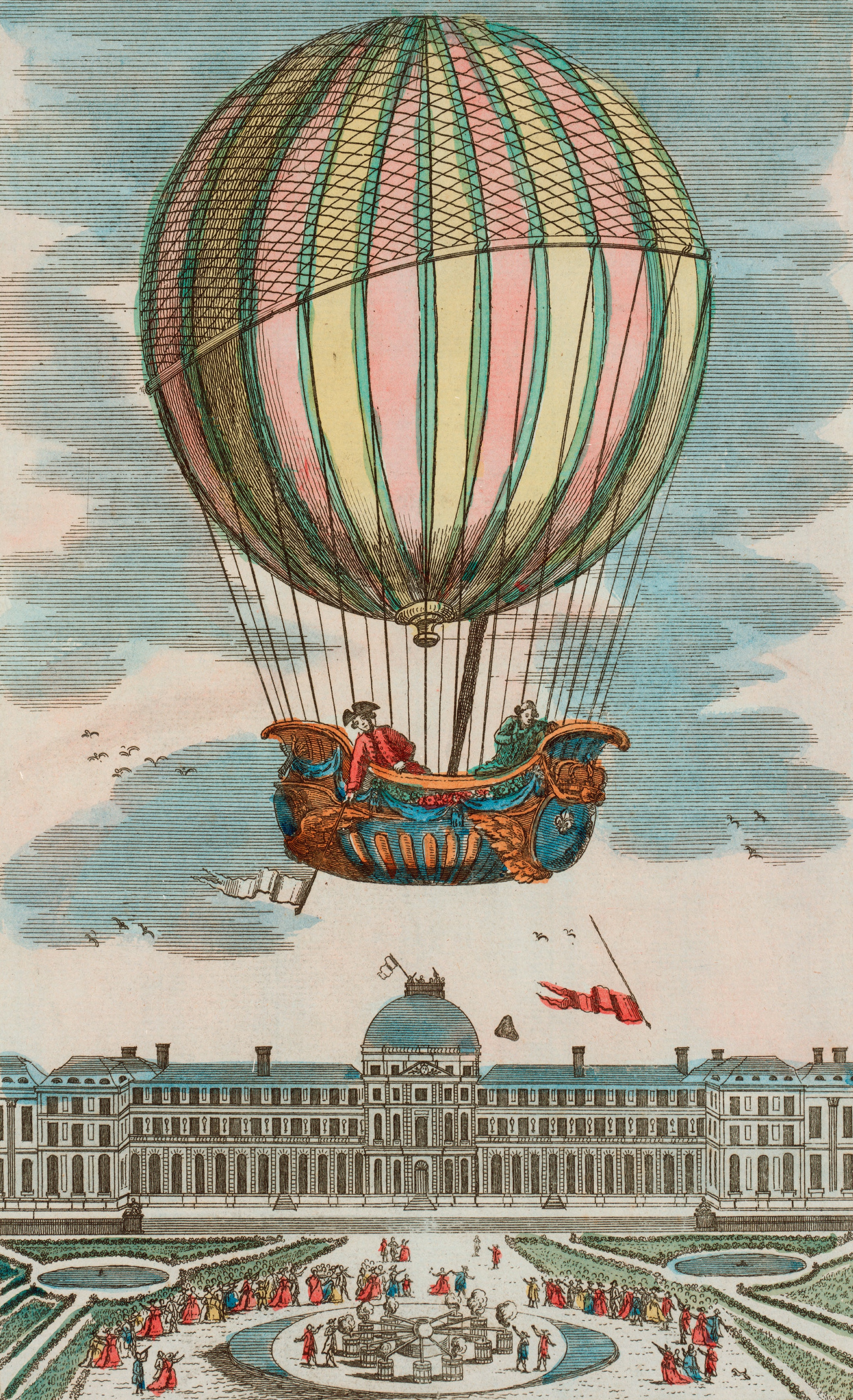
First flight of a hydrogen-filled balloon from garden on 1 December 1783

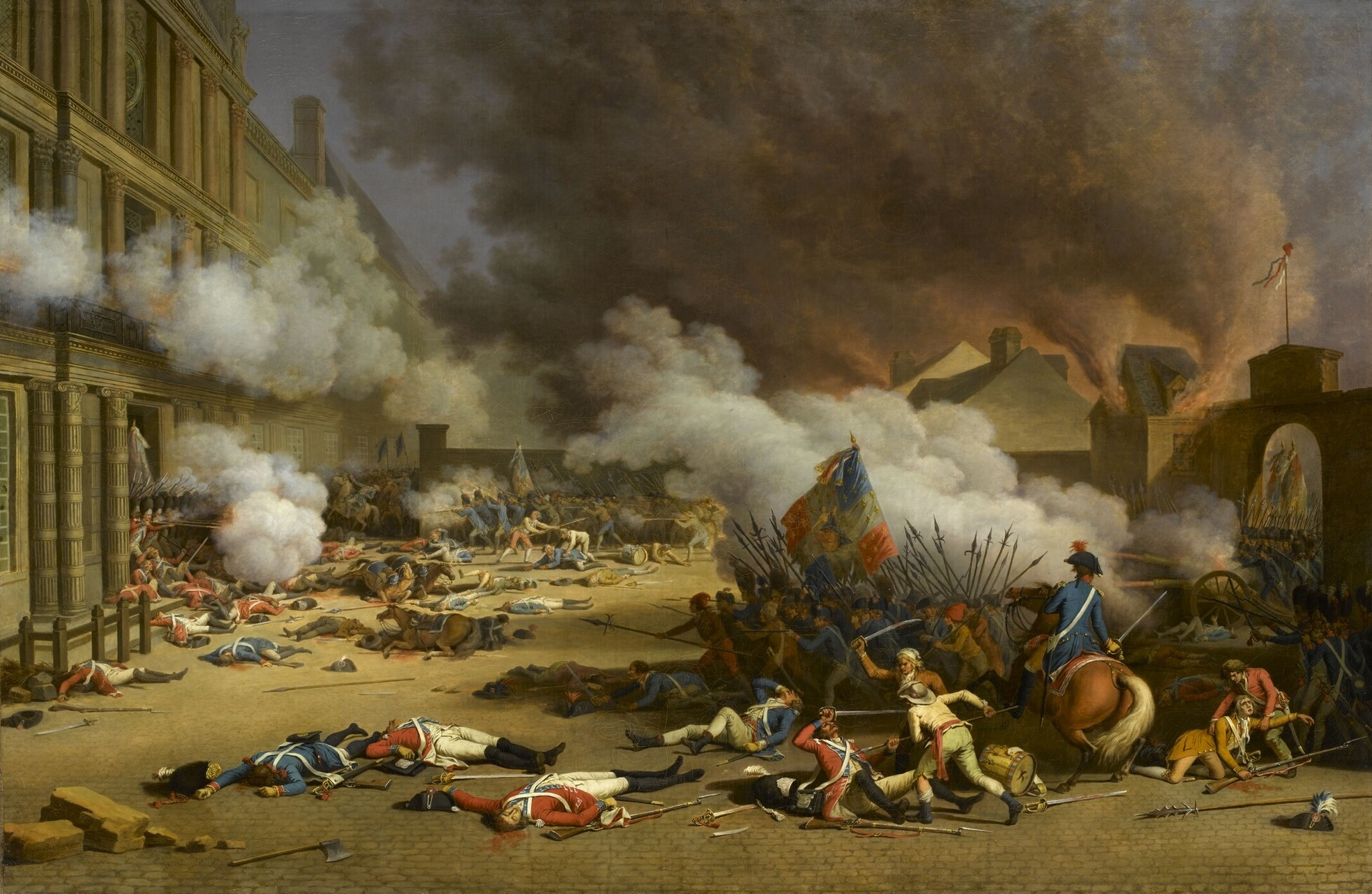
Fighting in the Tuileries Garden and massacre of Swiss Guards, 10 August 1792

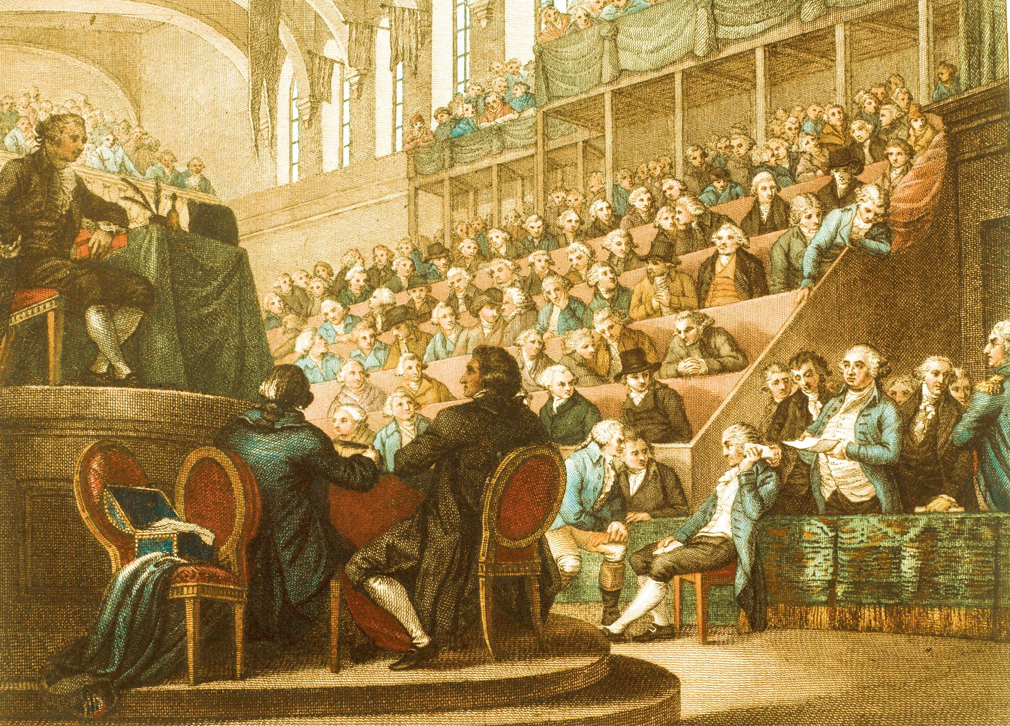
Louis XVI makes his plea at his trial, in the Salle du Manège, or riding school in the gardens, 26 December 1792

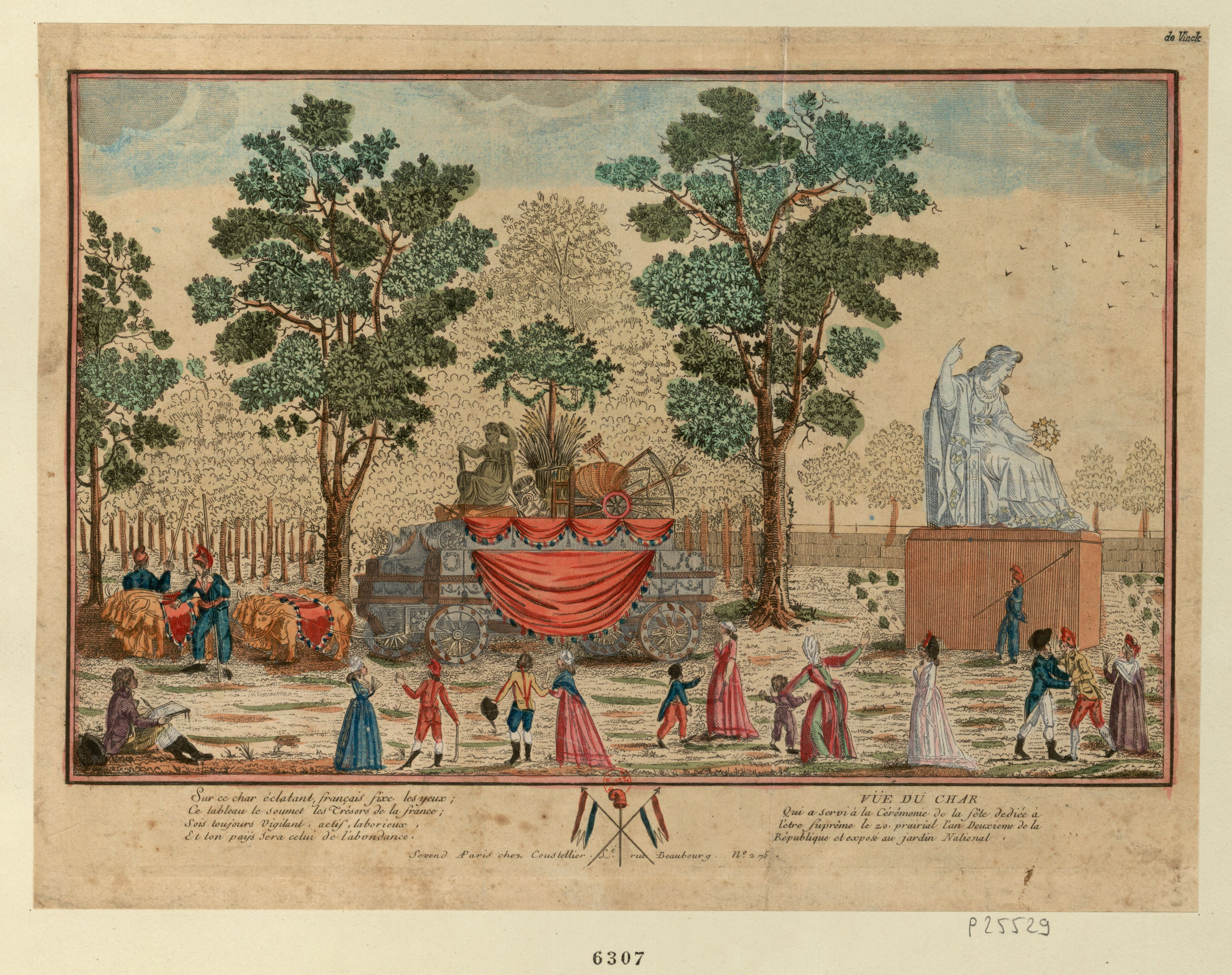
Ceremony of the Cult of the Supreme Being in the National Garden (Tuileries), 1794

After the death of Louis XIV, the five-year-old Louis XV became owner of the Tuileries Garden. In 1719, two large equestrian statuary groups, La Renommée and Mercure, by the sculptor Antoine Coysevox, were brought from the king's residence at Marly and placed at the west entrance of the garden. Other statues by Nicolas Coustou and Guillaume Coustou the Elder, Corneille Van Clève, Sébastien Slodtz, Thomas Regnaudin and Coysevox were placed along the Grande Allée. A swing bridge was placed at the west end over the moat, to make access to the garden easier. The creation of the Place Louis XV (now Place de la Concorde) created a grand vestibule to the garden, though entrance to the north side of the garden, prior to the construction of Rue Saint-Honoré by Napoleon, was obstructed by residences, convents and private gardens.

Certain holidays – such as 25 August, the feast day of Saint Louis – were celebrated with concerts and fireworks in the park. Small food stands were placed in the park, and chairs could be rented for a small fee. Public toilets were added in 1780.

A famous early balloon ascent, the first free flight of a manned hydrogen balloon, was made from the garden on 1 December 1783 by Jacques Alexandre César Charles and Nicolas Louis Robert. The King watched the flight from the tower of the palace. The first trial of the balloon was attended by the first American ambassador to Paris, Benjamin Franklin. The balloon and passengers landed safely at Nesles-la-Vallée, thirty-one miles from Paris.

On 6 October 1789, as the French Revolution began, King Louis XVI and family were brought against his will to the Tuileries Palace. The garden was reserved exclusively for the royal family in the morning, then open to the public in the afternoon. Queen Marie Antoinette and the Dauphin were given a part of the garden for her private use, first at the west end of the Promenade Bord d'eaux, then at the edge of the Place Louis XV.

After the King's failed attempt to escape France on 21 June 1791, the King and family were placed under house arrest in the palace. The royal family was allowed to walk in the park on the evening of 18 September 1791, during the festival organized to celebrate the new French Constitution, when the alleys of the park were illuminated with pyramids and rows of lanterns. But as the Revolution took a more radical turn, On 10 August 1792, a mob stormed the palace, the King was imprisoned, and the King's Swiss Guards fell back through the gardens where they were massacred.

The new revolutionary government, the National Convention, met in the Salle du Manège, the former riding academy in the northwest corner of the gardens, which was the largest meeting hall in the city. Louis XVI was put on trial by the National Convention at the Manège, and was sentenced to death. Afterwards the Tuileries became the National Garden (Jardin National) of the new French Republic. The Convention ordered that statues from the former royal gardens of Marly, Versailles and Fontainebleau be brought to Paris and installed in the National Garden. The originals are now in the Louvre, with copies taking their place in the gardens.

The garden was also used to celebrate revolutionary holidays and festivals. On 8 June 1794, a series of events to honour the Cult of the Supreme Being was organized in Paris by Robespierre, with sets and costumes designed by Jacques-Louis David. The opening event was held in the Tuileries. After a hymn written for the occasion, Robespierre set fire to mannequins representing Atheism, Ambition, Egoism and False Simplicity, revealing a statue of Wisdom. The ceremony then moved on the a larger event in the Champs de Mars. Two months later, however, Robespierre was accused of excessive ambition, arrested and sent to the guillotine.

During their storming, the gardens had been badly damaged, with many buildings set on fire. The National Convention assigned the renewal of the gardens to the painter Jacques-Louis David, and to his brother in law, the architect August Cheval de Saint-Hubert. They conceived a garden decorated with Roman porticos, monumental porches, columns, and other classical decoration. The project of David and Saint-Hubert was never completed. All that remains today are the two exedres, semicircular low walls crowned with statues by the two ponds in the centre of the garden.

=== Early 19th century – the garden of Napoleon and the Restoration ===
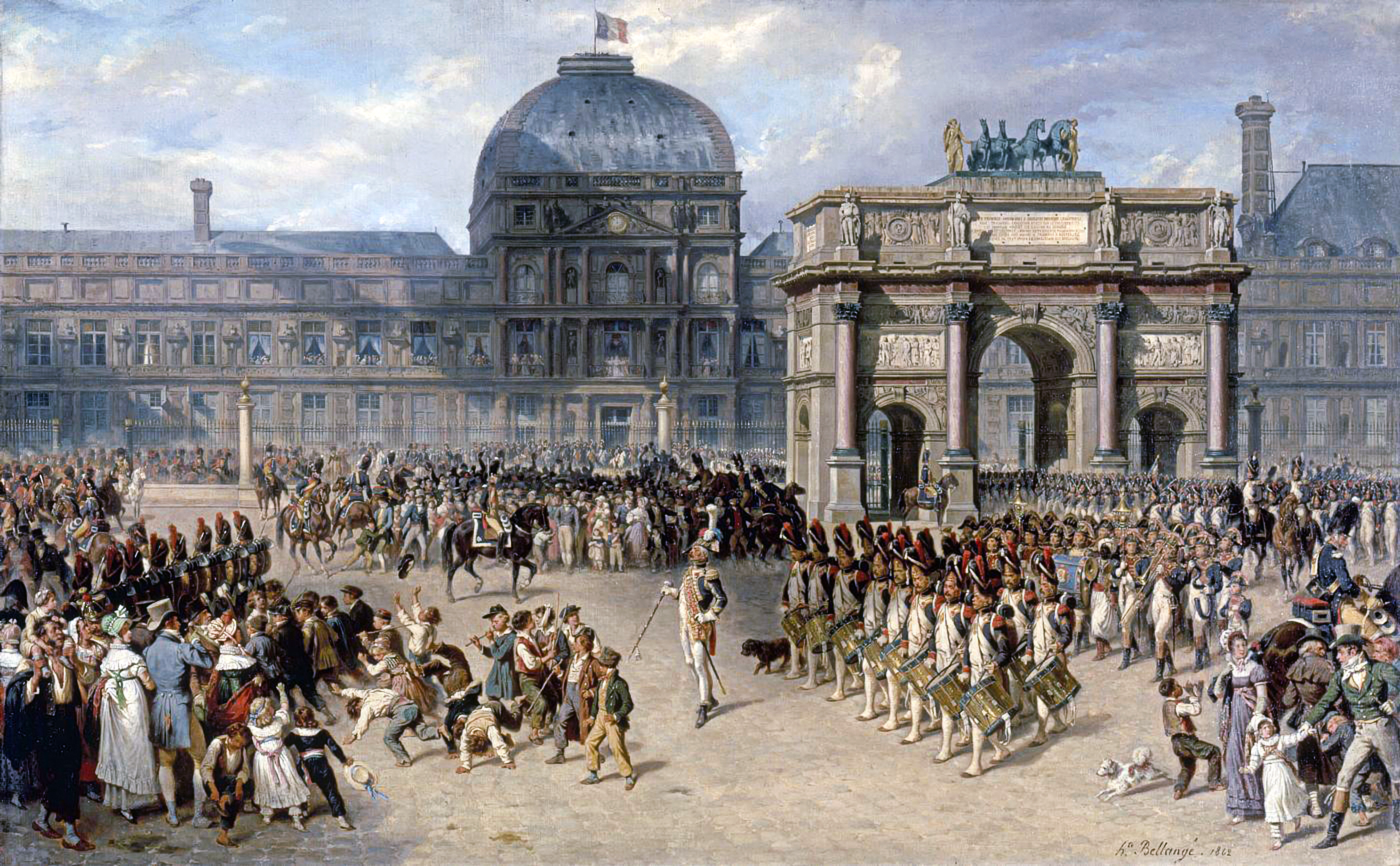
An Imperial review at the new Arc de Triomphe du Carrousel built by Napoleon, 1810

Napoleon Bonaparte moved into the Tuileries Palace on 19 February 1800 as First Consul, and began making improvements to suit a consular and soon to be imperial residence. His major addition to the palace-garden complex was the Arc de Triomphe du Carrousel in the large courtyard between the Tuileries Palace and the Louvre, This was modeled after the triumphal Arch of Septimius Severus in Rome, and was designed to be the ceremonial entrance to his palace, It also became the centerpiece of the large parade ground where Louis XIV had held his Carrousel procession.

In 1801, Napoleon ordered the construction of a new street along the northern edge of the Tuileries Garden through space that had been occupied by the riding school and stables built by Marie de' Medici, and the private gardens of aristocrats and convents and religious orders that had been closed during the Revolution. This new street also took part of the Terrasse des Feuillants, which had been occupied by cafés and restaurants. The new street, lined with arcades on the north side, was named the rue de Rivoli, after Napoleon's victory in 1797.

Napoleon made few changes to the interior of the garden. He continued to use the garden for military parades and to celebrate special events, including the passage of his own wedding procession on 2 April 1810, when he married the Archduchess Marie-Louise of Austria.

After Napoleon's fall, Russian and Prussian troops were camped in the garden, and the restored monarchs moved into the Tuileries Palace. During the July Revolution of 1830, the garden again became a battleground, stormed by opponents of the monarchy. King Charles X was replaced by a constitutional king, Louis Philippe. Louis-Philippe, reluctant to have garden visitors walking by his window, had a large flower garden protected by a moat created to isolate his residence in the palace from the popular footpaths. This made him unpopular among Parisians and contributed to his downfall in 1848.

=== Concerts and promenades - the garden of Louis-Napoleon and the Third Republic ===
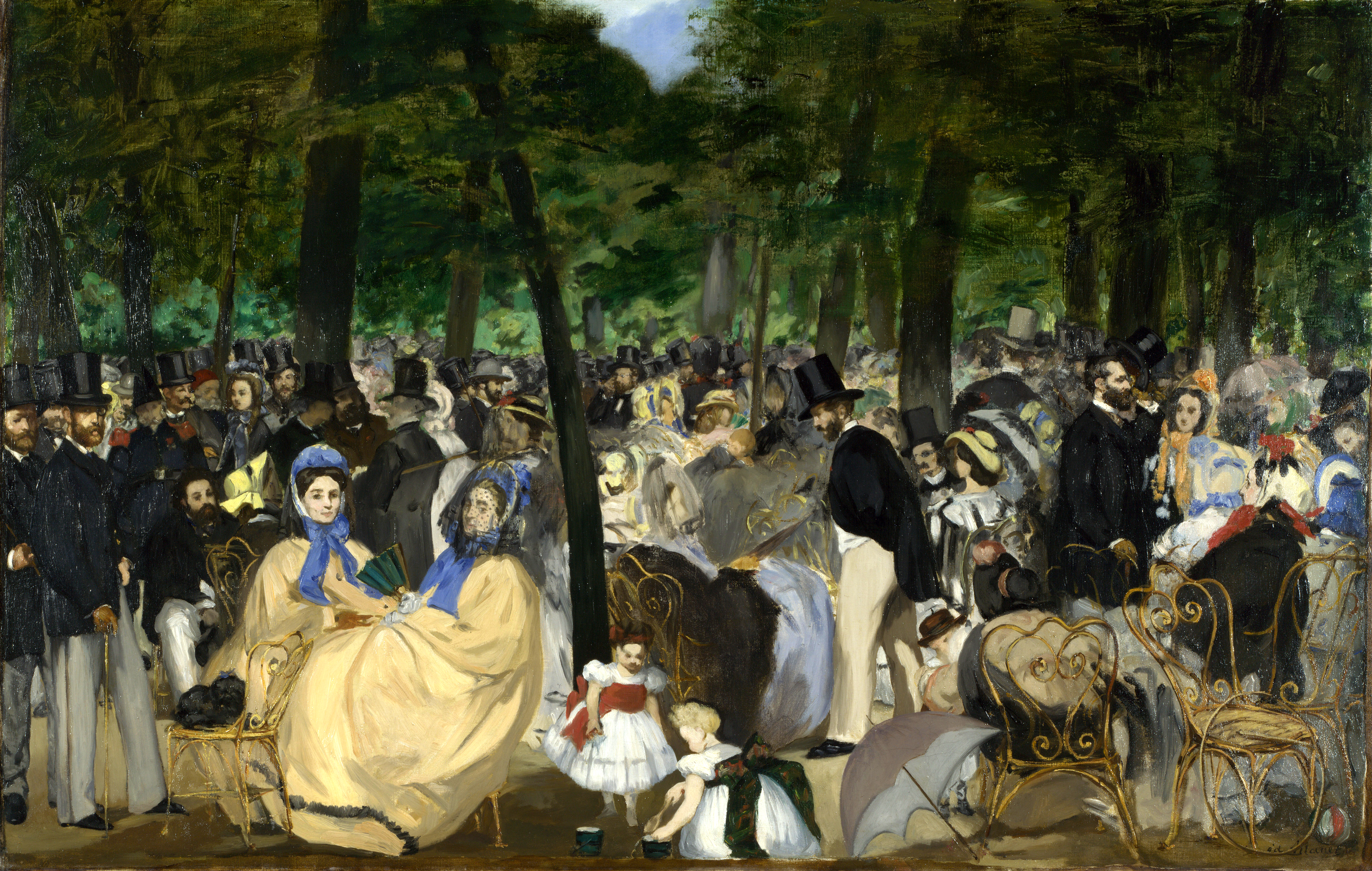
Édouard Manet, Music in the Tuileries, 1862

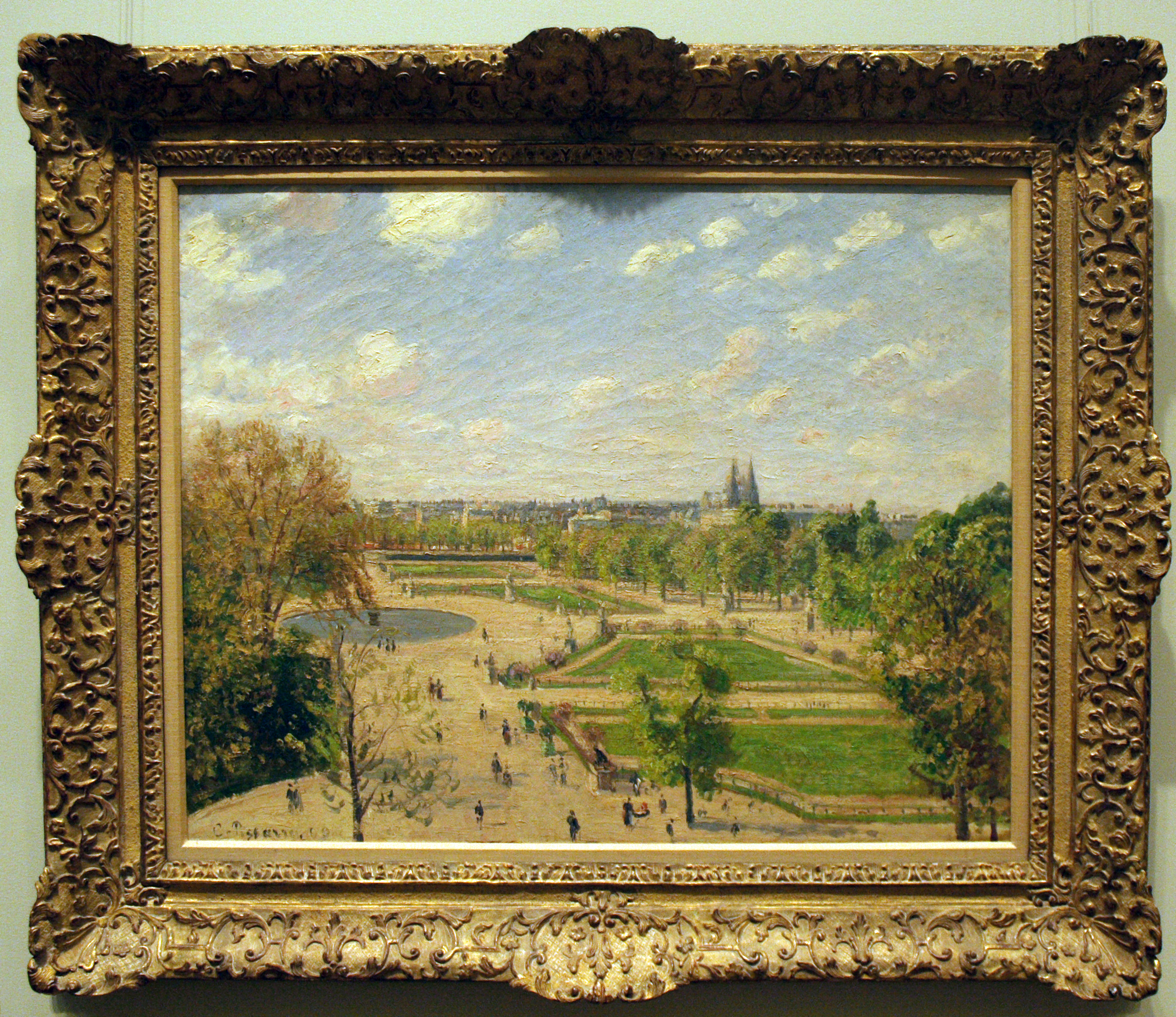
Camille Pissarro, The Garden of the Tuileries on a Spring Morning, 1899

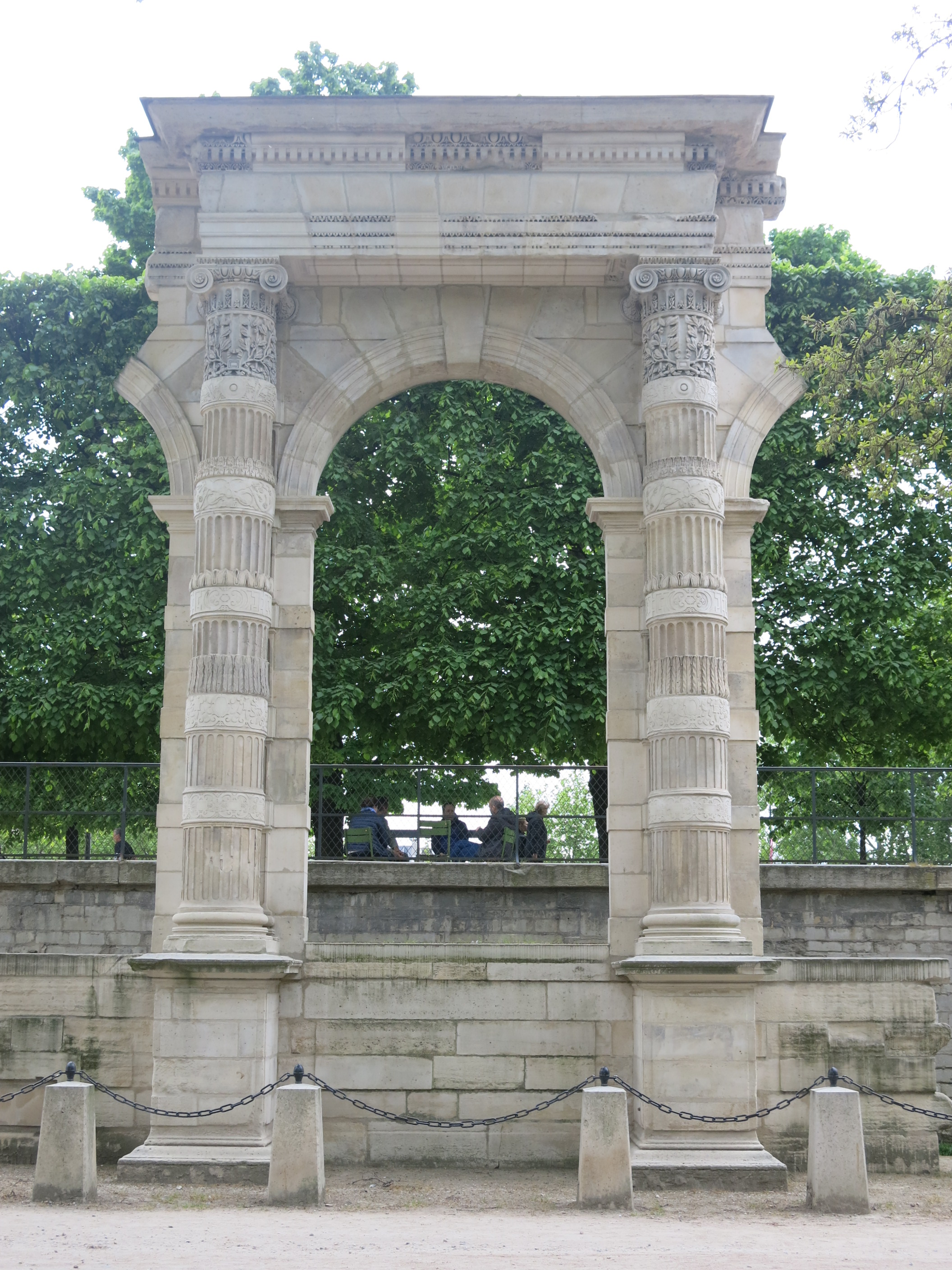
Vestige of the Tuileries Palace in the Tuileries Garden

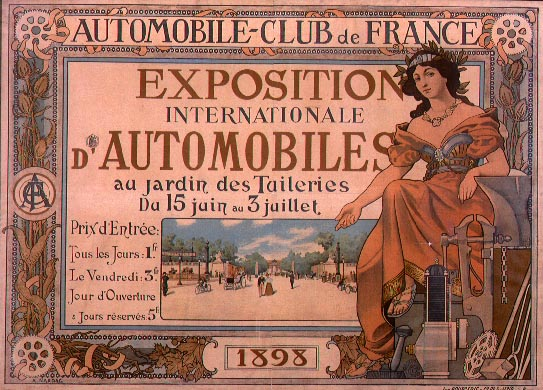
Post for the 1893 Salon d'Automobile in the garden

In 1852, following another revolution and the short-lived Second Republic, Emperor Napoleon III became owner of the garden, and made major changes. He enlarged the royal reserve within the garden further to the west as far as the north–south alley that crossed the large round basin, He decorated the gardens with beds of exotic plants and flowers, and new statues. In 1859, he turned the Terrasse du bord-de-l'eau into a playground for his son, Louis-Napoléon, Prince Imperial. He also constructed twin pavilions. The garden embellishments added by Napoleon III included an indoor handball court, the Jeu de Paume, and an Orangerie. He built a new stone balustrade at the west entrance. When the Emperor was not in Paris, usually from May to November, the entire garden, including his private garden and the playground, were opened to the public.

In 1870, Napoleon III was defeated and captured by the Prussians, and Paris was the scene of the uprising of the Paris Commune. A red flag flew over the palace, and it could be visited for fifty centimes. When the army arrived and fought to recapture the city, the Communards deliberately burned the Tuileries Palace, and tried to burn the Louvre as well. The ruins, burned out inside but with walls largely intact, were torn down in 1883. The empty site of the palace, between the two pavilions of the Louvre, became part of the garden.

Dozens of statues were added to the garden. It also served as the setting for large civic events such as the banquet given during the 1900 Paris Universal Exposition on 22 September 1900, in honour of the twenty-two thousand mayors of France, served under large tents. The Tuileries Garden was filled with entertainments for the public; acrobats, puppet theatres, lemonade stands, small boats on the lakes, donkey rides, and stands selling toys. It was a meeting for major commercial events, such as the first Paris Motor Show in 1898. At the 1900 Summer Olympics, the Gardens hosted the fencing events.

=== 20th and 21st century – restoration, updating and the cauldron ===
During the First World War (1914–1918), the gardeners were drafted into the army, and maintenance of the garden was reduced to a minimum. The statues were surrounded by sandbags. In 1918, two German long-range artillery shells landed in the garden.

In the years between the two World Wars, the Jeu de paume tennis court was turned into a gallery devoted to contemporary art. The Orangerie, originally used to keep citrus trees during the winter, was also made into a gallery, with the eastern wing devoted to the display of eight paintings of the Water Lilies series by Claude Monet. They were installed there in 1927, shortly after Monet's death.

During World War II, the Jeu de paume was used by the Germans as a warehouse for art they had stolen or confiscated. An exposition of work by the German sculptor Arno Breker, a favourite of Hitler, was held in the Orangerie. The liberation of Paris in 1944 saw considerable fighting in the garden between the Germans and the French resistance. Monet's paintings were damaged during the fighting. In 1946, after the end of World War II, many masterpieces from private collections were recovered in Germany by the French Commission for Art Recovery and the Monuments Men and they were brought to the Orangerie, in a program to restore them to owners or surviving family members.

Until the 1960s, most sculpture in the garden dated from the 18th or 19th century. In 1964–65, André Malraux, the Minister of Culture for President Charles de Gaulle, removed the 19th century statues which surrounded the Place du Carrousel and replaced them with contemporary sculptures by Aristide Maillol.

In 1994, as part of the Grand Louvre project launched by President François Mitterrand, the Belgian landscape architect Jacques Wirtz remade the garden of the Carrousel, adding labyrinths and a fan of low hedges radiating from the Arc de Triomphe du Carrousel in the square.

In 1998, under President Jacques Chirac, works of modern sculpture by Jean Dubuffet, Henri Laurens, Étienne Martin, Henry Moore, Germaine Richier, Auguste Rodin and David Smith were placed in the garden. In 2000, the works of living artists were added; these included works by Magdalena Abakanowicz, Louise Bourgeois, Tony Cragg, Roy Lichtenstein, François Morellet, Giuseppe Penone, Anne Rochette and Lawrence Weiner. Another ensemble of three works by Daniel Dezeuze, Erik Dietman and Eugène Dodeigne, called Prière Toucher (Eng: Please Touch), was added at the same time. At the beginning of the 21st century, French landscape architects Pascal Cribier and Louis Benech have been working to restore some of the early features of the André Le Nôtre garden.

Starting in November 2021, ninety-two elm trees are being added to the Grande Allée to recreate its historic appearance.

Since the beginning of 2020, a project for the erection of a large national memorial is also being prepared, the latter will feature the list of names of the 200,000 slaves freed by the French abolition of 1848.

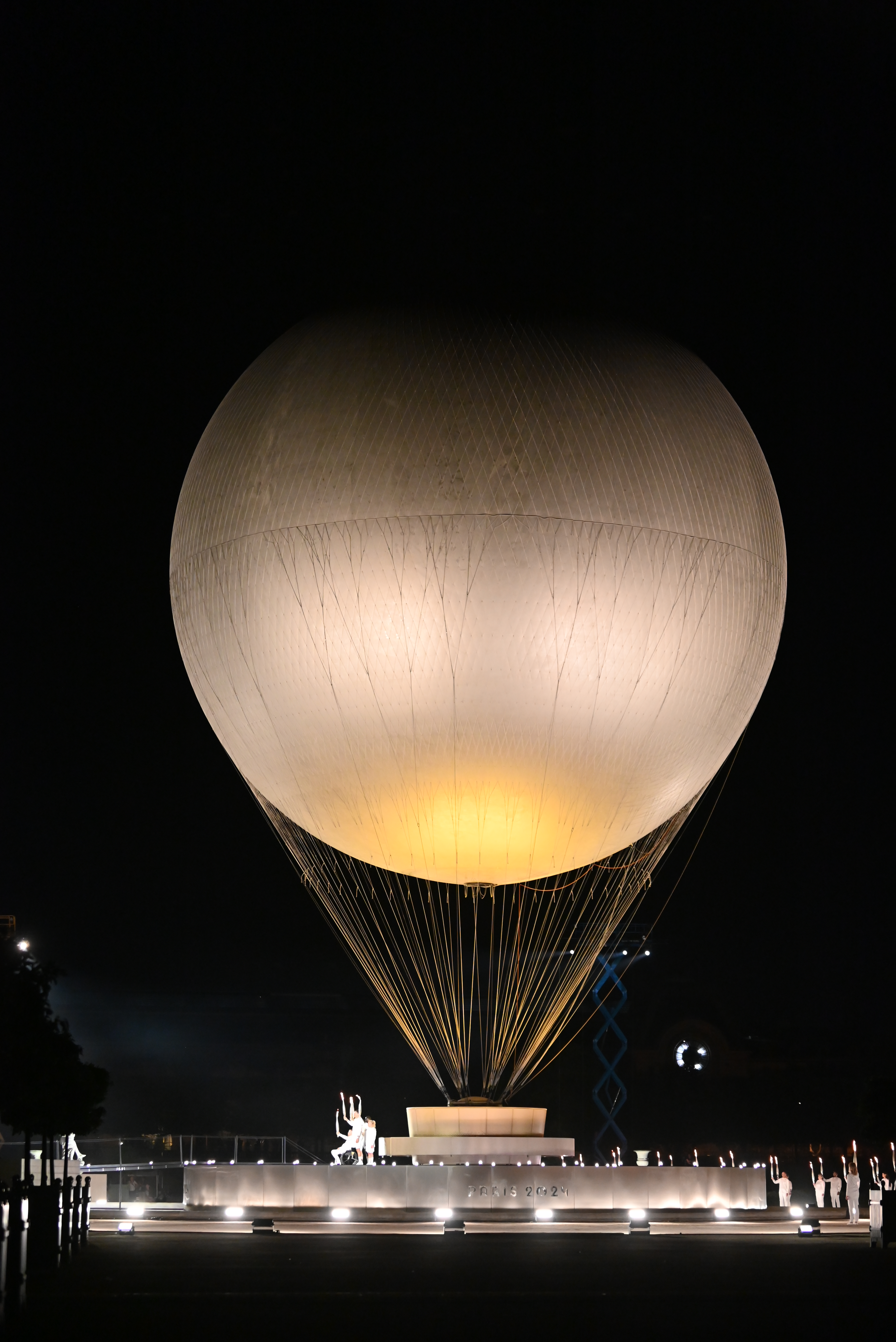
Paralympic balloon lighting ceremony

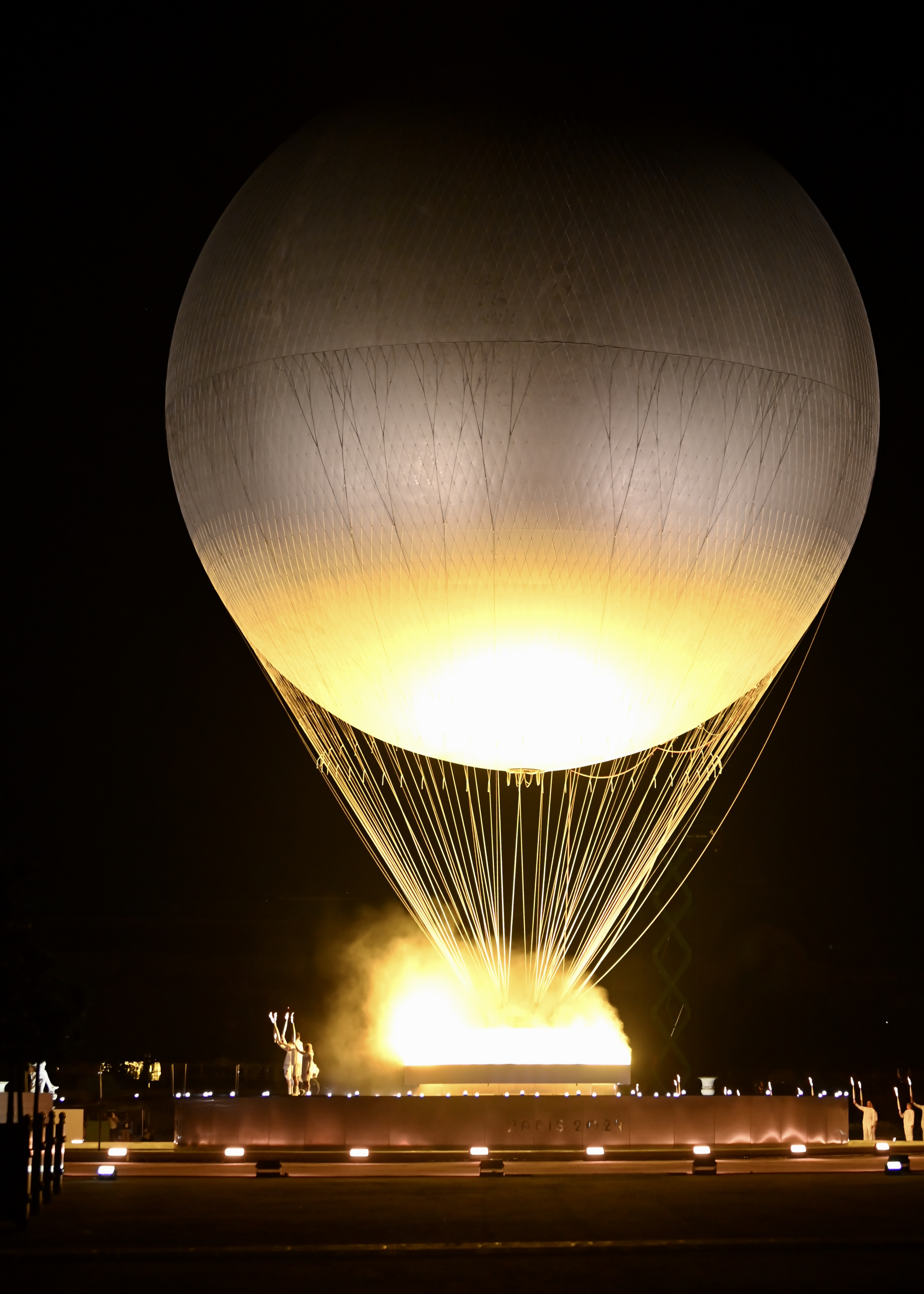
Lighting the Paralympic flame

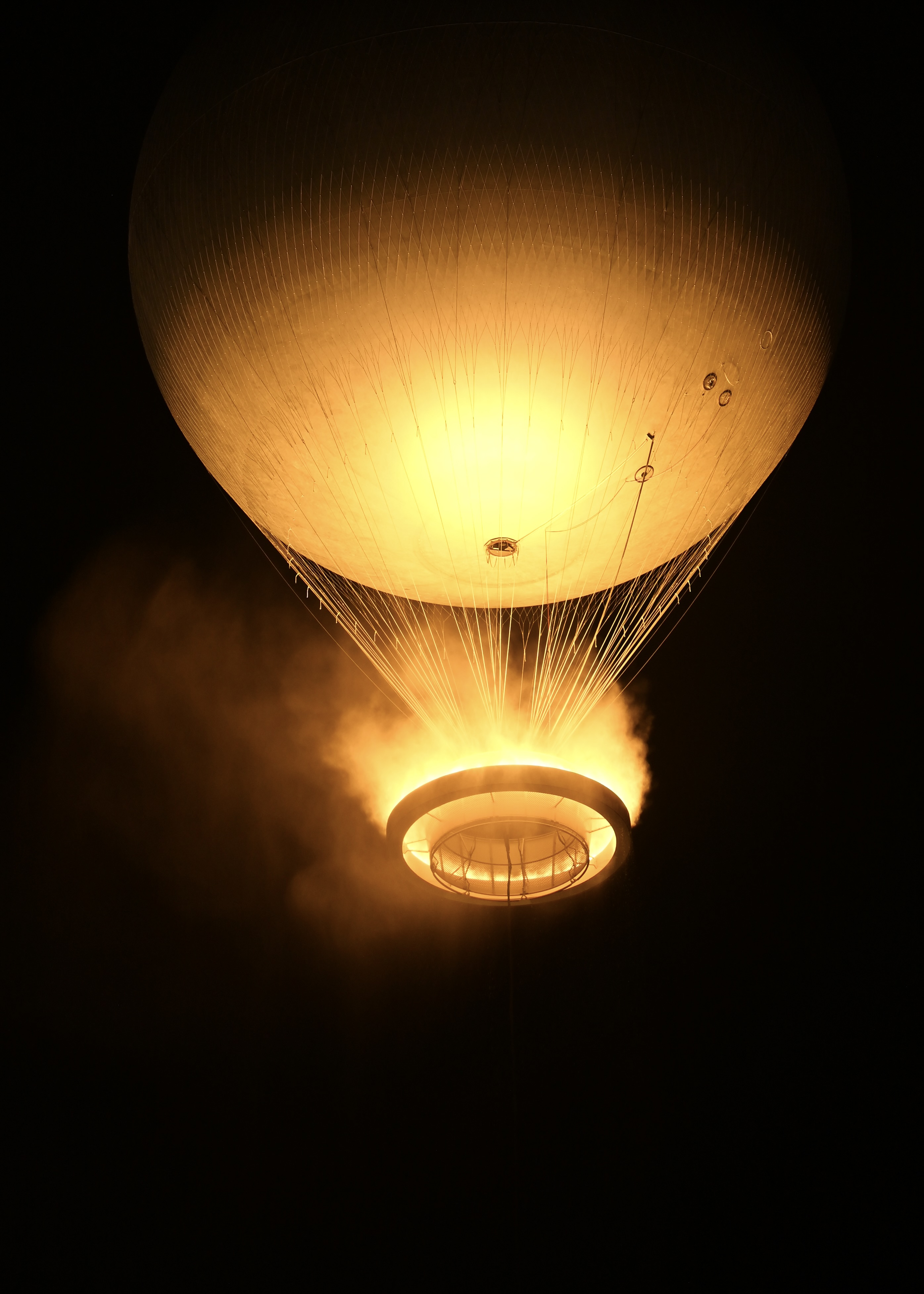
Balloon carrying the flame rises

In 2024, a platform was installed in the middle of the Grand Bassin Rond on which the city's new Olympic and Paralympic cauldron rested. Mathieu Lehanneur designed the cauldron as part of a hot air balloon in tribute to the Montgolfier brothers – a helium sphere 30 metres (98 ft) high with a ring of fire 7 metres (23 ft) in diameter hanging from the bottom. It is also the first such cauldron that burns without using fossil fuels. The final torch bearers in their respective torch relays who lit the flame during their respective opening ceremonies were:

- Olympics (28 July) – Judoka Teddy Riner and sprinter Marie-José Pérec, both native Guadeloupeans
- Paralympics (28 August) – Triathlete Alexis Hanquinquant, sprinters Nantenin Keïta and Charles-Antoine Kouakou, table tennis player Fabien Lamirault and swimmer Élodie Lorandi

The cauldron has remained landed during the day and has risen into the sky at sunset and when lit during both opening ceremonies, anchored to the ground by a wire-like conduit in the middle of the Grand Bassin Rond. The maximum 10,000 people per day visited the cauldron daily during the Olympics, and calls have been made to make the cauldron a permanent fixture.

== Plan ==
Plan of the Jardin des Tuileries

== Description ==
Beginning at the east end, closest to the Louvre, these are some of the primary features of the garden.

=== Jardin du Carrousel ===
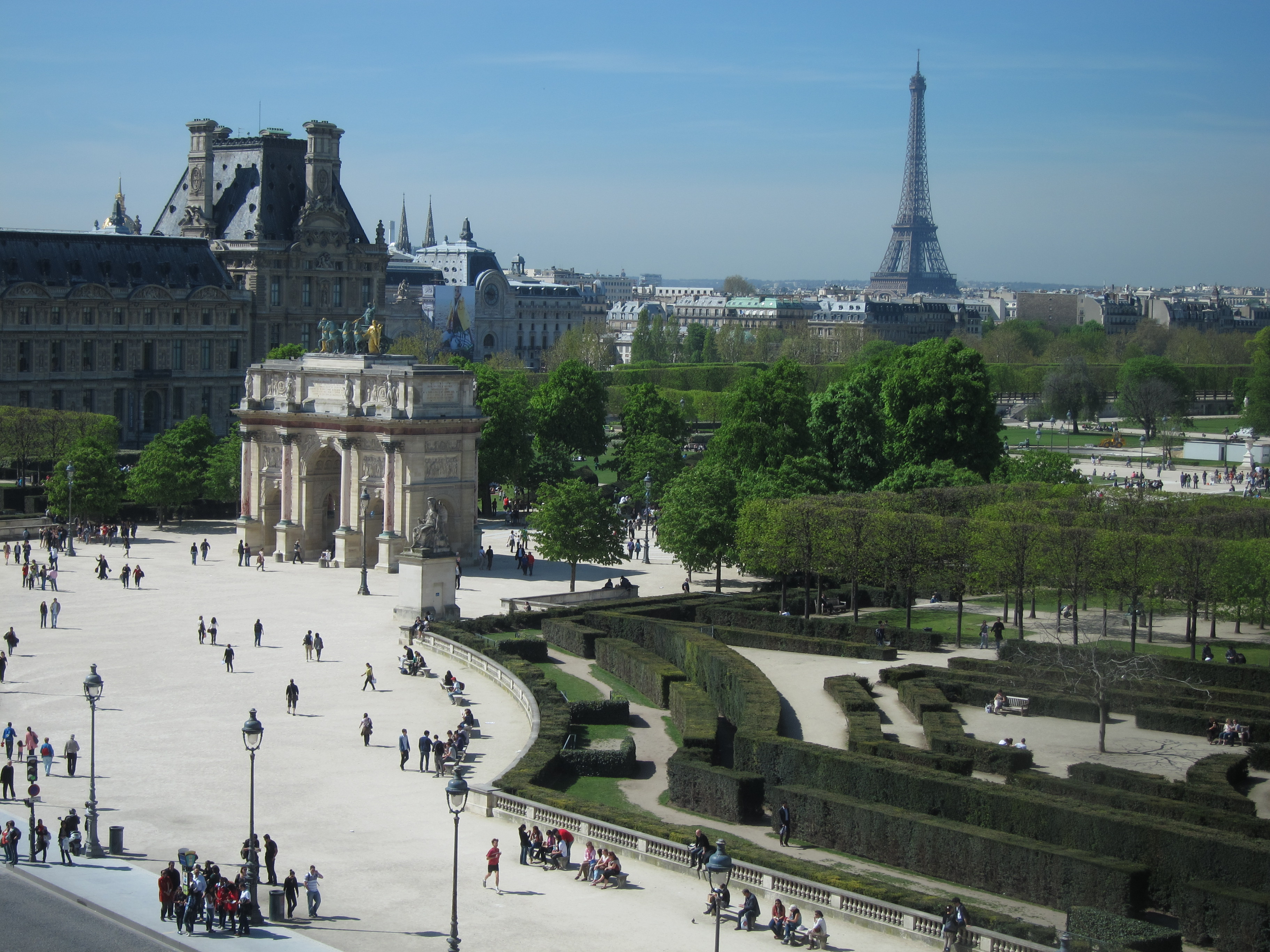
Place and Jardin du Carrousel.

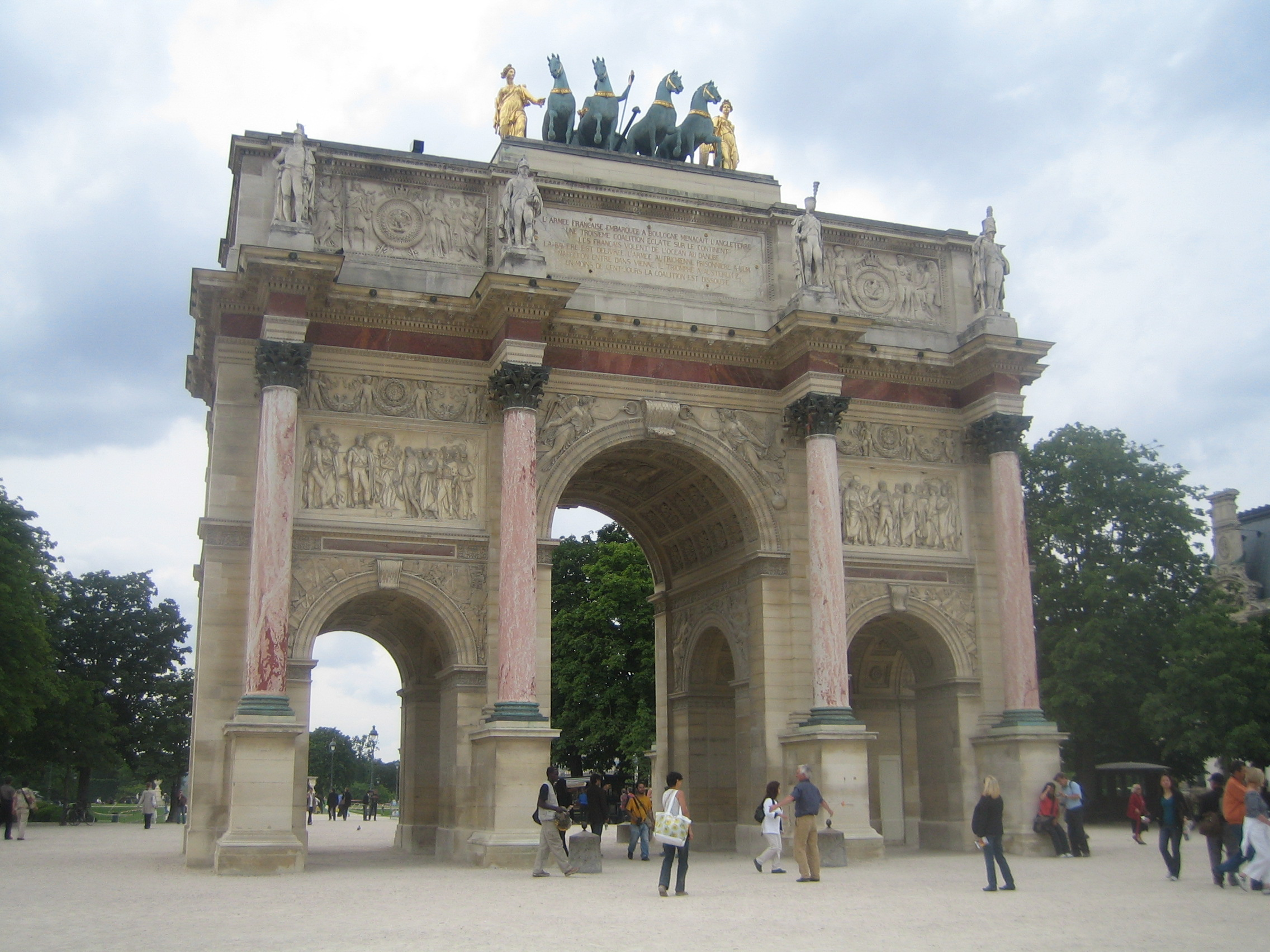
Arc de Triomphe du Carrousel (1809) built by the Emperor Napoleon to celebrate his victories.

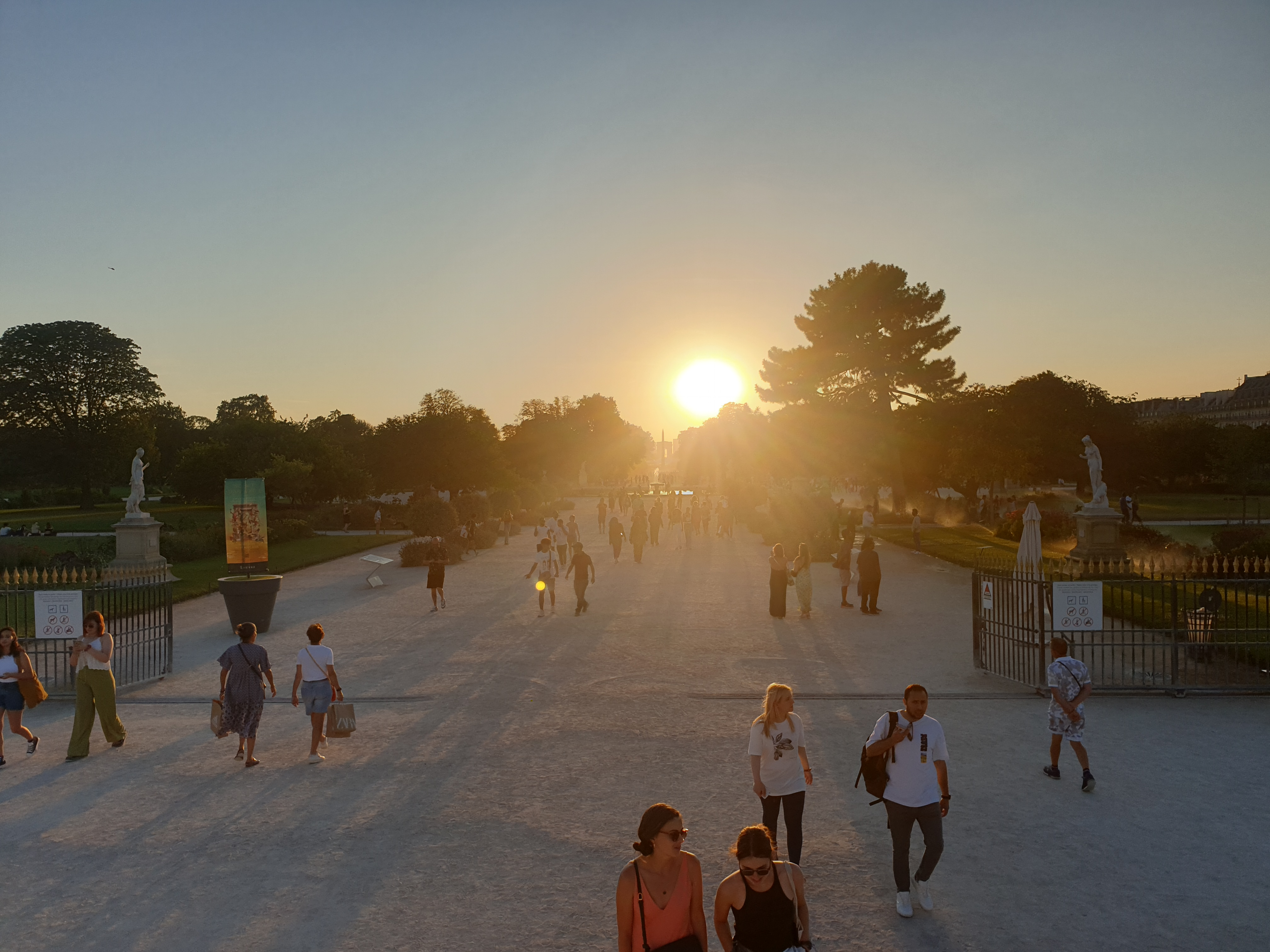
Walkers in the Tuileries Garden during the summer of 2022.

Also known as the Place du Carrousel, this part of the garden used to be enclosed by the two wings of the Louvre and by the Tuileries Palace. In the 18th century it was used as a parade ground for cavalry and other festivities. The central feature is the Arc de Triomphe du Carrousel, built to celebrate the victories of Napoleon, with bas-relief sculptures of his battles by Jean-Joseph Espercieux. It was originally surmounted by the Horses of Saint Mark from St Mark's Basilica in Venice, which had been captured in 1798 by Napoleon. In 1815, following the Battle of Waterloo and Bourbon restoration, the horses were sent back to Venice and replaced in 1826 by a new group of sculpture, selected by Charles X, representing the triumph of peace.

The elevated terrace between the Carrousel and the rest of the garden used to be at the front of the Tuileries Palace. After the palace was burned in 1870, it was made into a road, which was put underground in 1877. The terrace is decorated by two large vases which used to be in the gardens of Versailles, and two statues by Aristide Maillol; the Monument to Cézanne on the north and the Monument aux morts de Port Vendres on the south.

The Moat of Charles V is a vestige of the original fortifications of the Medieval Louvre Castle, which was then at the edge of the city. It was rebuilt by Charles V of France in the 14th century, Two stairways parallel to the Arc du Triumph du Carrousel lead down into the moat. On the west side of the moat are traces left by the fighting during the unsuccessful siege of Paris by Henry IV of France in 1590 during the French Wars of Religion.

Since 1994 the moat has been decorated with statues from the façade of the old Tuileries Palace and with bas-reliefs made in the 19th century during the Restoration. These were originally intended to replace the Napoleonic bas-reliefs on the Arc de Triomphe du Carrousel, but they were never put in place.

=== The Grand Carré ===
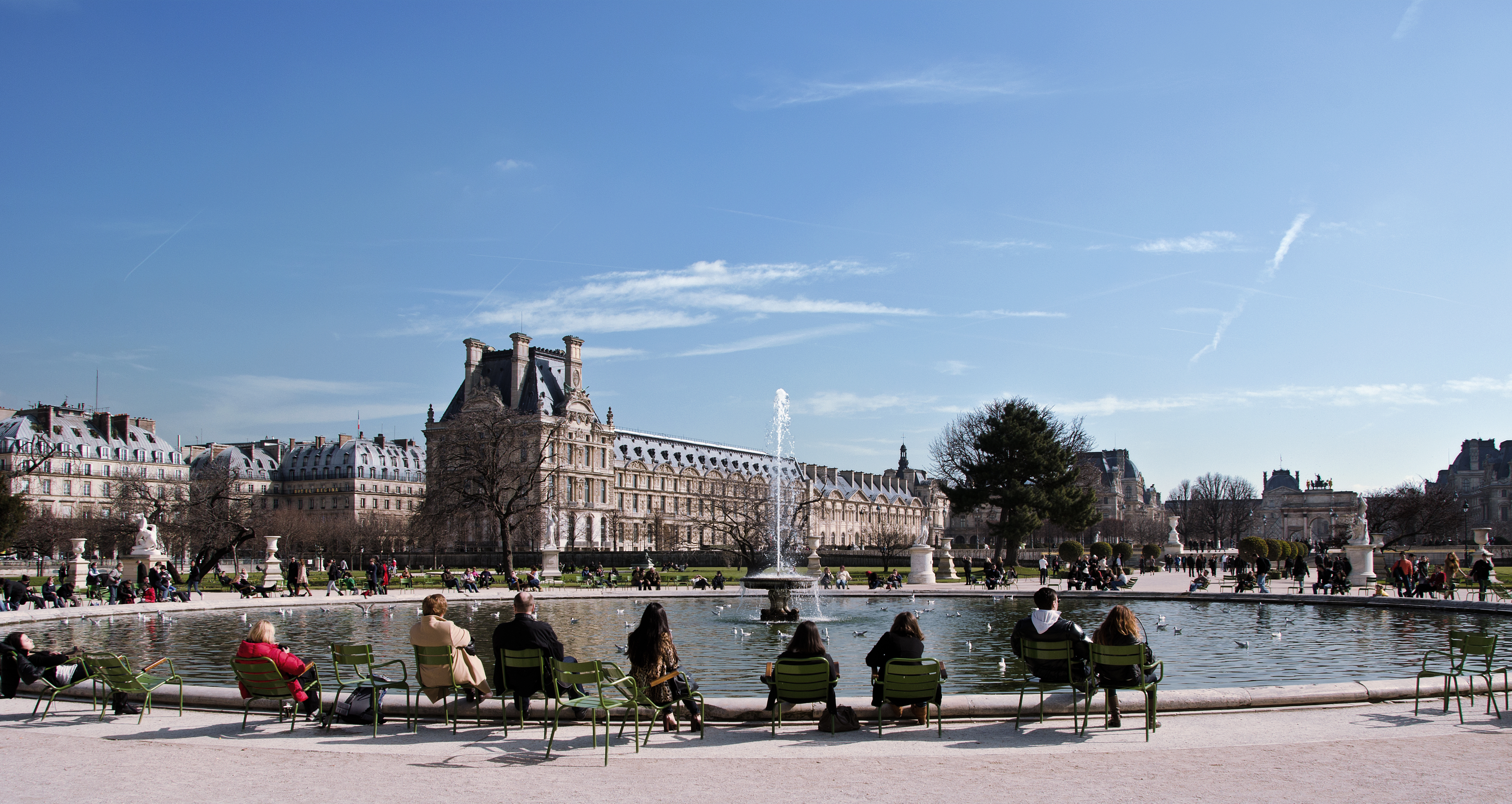
The Grand Bassin, or circular pond, originally part of the private royal garden

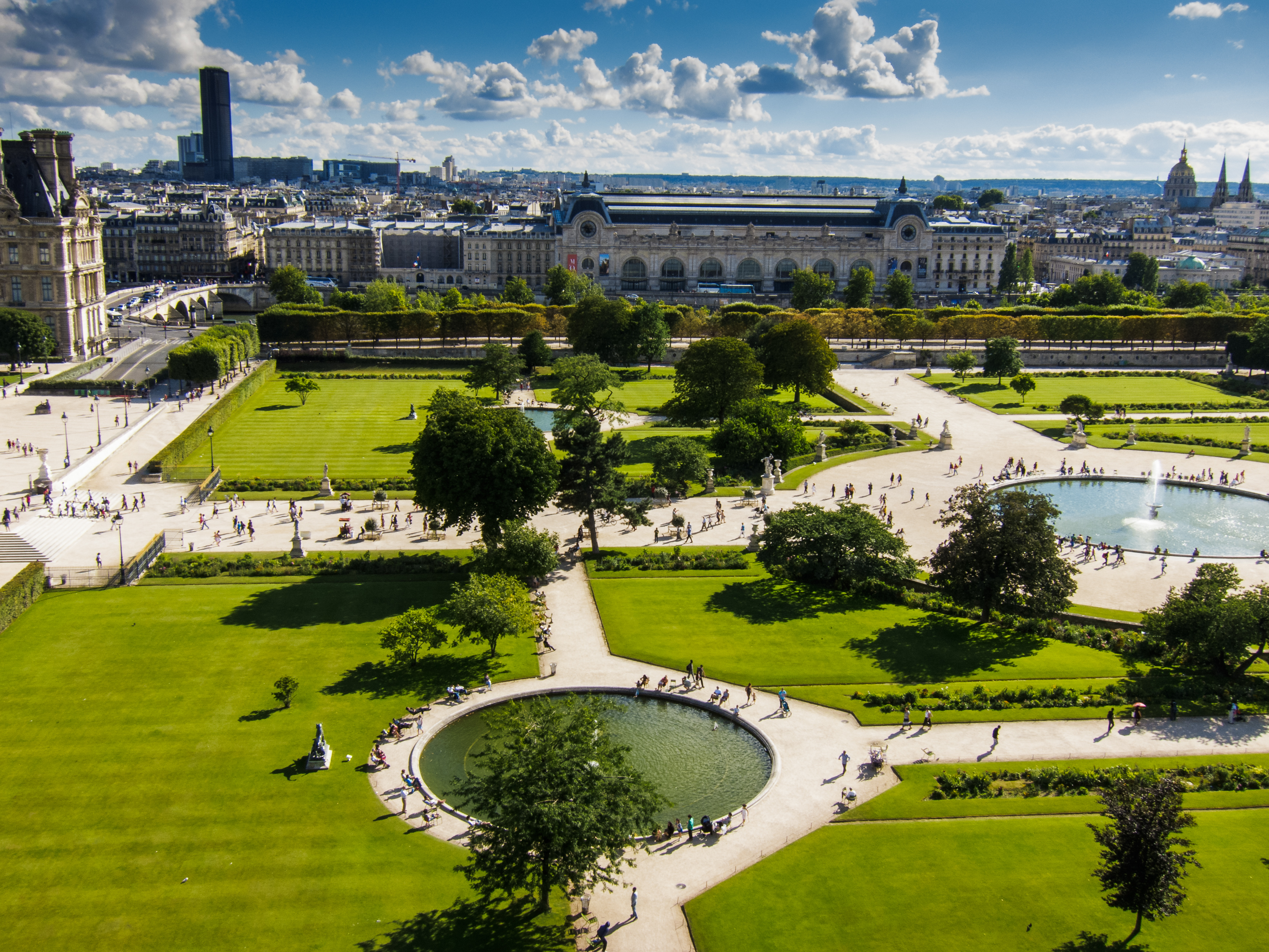
The Grand Carré, with its three ponds. The Musee d'Orsay is in the background

The Grand Carré (Large Square) is the eastern, open part of the Tuileries Garden, close to the Louvre, which still follows the formal plan of the Garden à la française created by André Le Nôtre in the 17th century.

The eastern part of the Grand Carré, surrounding the circular pond, was the private garden of the King under Louis Philippe and Napoleon III, separated from the rest of the Tuileries by a fence. Most of the statues in the Grand Carré were put in place in the 19th century.

- Nymphe (1866) and Diane Chasseresse (Diana the Huntress) (1869) by Auguste Levêque, which mark the beginning of the central allée which runs east–west through the park.
- Tigre terrassant un crocodile (Tiger overwhelming a crocodile) (1873) and Tigresse portant un paon à ses petits (Tigress bringing a peacock to her young) (1873), both by Auguste Cain, by the two small round ponds.

The large round pond is surrounded by statues on themes from antiquity, allegory, and ancient mythology. Statues in violent poses alternate with those in serene poses. On the south side, starting from the east entrance of the large round pond, they are:

- La Misère (Misery) by Jean-Baptiste Hugues (1905)
- Périclès distribuant les couronnes aux artistes (Pericles Giving Crowns to Artists) by Jean Baptiste Joseph De Bay père (1835)
- Le Bon Samaritain (The Good Samaritan) by François-Léon Sicard (1896)
- Alexandre Combattant (Alexander Fighting) by Charles Nanteuil (1836)
- Cincinnatus by Denis Foyatier (1834)
- Médée by Paul Gasq (1896)

On the north side, starting at the west entrance to the pond, they are:

- Le Serment de Spartacus (The Oath of Spartacus) by Louis-Ernest Barrias (1869)
- La Comédie by Julien Toussaint Roux (1874)
- Le Centaur Nessus enlevant Dėjanire (The Centaur Nessus Carrying Off Dejanire) by Laurent Marqueste (1892)
- Thésée combattant le Minotaure (Theseus Fighting the Minotaur) by Étienne-Jules Ramey (1821)
- Cassandre se met sous la protection de Pallas by Aimé Millet (1877)
- Caïn venant de tuer son frère Abel (Cain After Killing His Brother Abel) by Henri Vidal (1896)

=== The Grande Allée and Grand Couvert ===
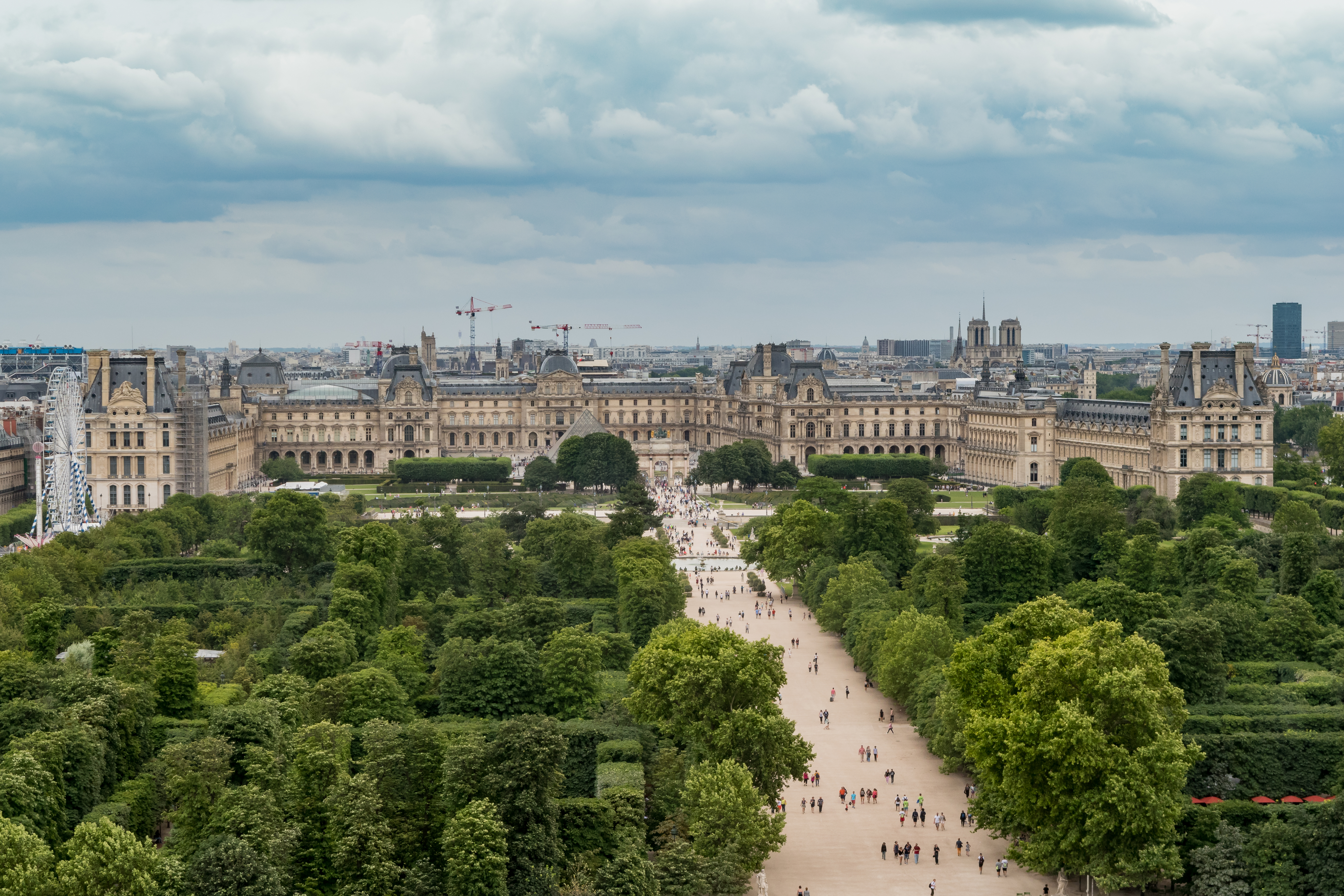
The Grand Couvert, the forested central portion of the garden, looking toward the Louvre

The Grand Couvert is the central, tree-covered portion of the garden. It is divided by the Grande Allée, the wide path that runs from the Round pond to the gates of the Place de la Concorde. Most of the trees are relatively recent, with only a small number dating back to the early 19th century or earlier. The Couvert was extensively replanted in the 1990s, with eight hundred trees added since 1997. Cyclone Lothar in 1999 caused extensive damage, and brought down a number of the oldest trees.

The two outdoor cafes in the Grand Couvert are named after two famous cafes once located in the garden; the café Very, which had been on the terrasse des Feuillants in the 18th–19th century; and the café Renard, which in the 18th century had been a popular meeting place on the western terrace.

The alleys of the Couvert are decorated with two exedra, low curving walls built to display statues, which were installed during the French Revolution. They were completed in 1799 by Jean-Charles-Alexandre Moreau, and are the only surviving elements of a larger proposed garden plan by painter Jacques-Louis David made in 1794. They are now decorated with plaster casts of moldings on mythological themes from the park of Louis XIV at Marly.

A Quercus robur, or English oak, was planted in 1992 on the Esplanade des Feuillants to commemorate the 200th anniversary of the French Republic. It is a reminder of the "Liberty Tree" symbol that first appeared in America before the American Revolution. They were then planted in the garden and around France during the French Revolution, and later, in the French Revolution of 1848, Louis XVI himself planted the first liberty tree in the Tuileries Garden, but it was cut down after his execution. A stylized depiction of a Liberty Tree decorates the French one Euro and two Euro coins.

=== The Esplanade des Feuillants ===
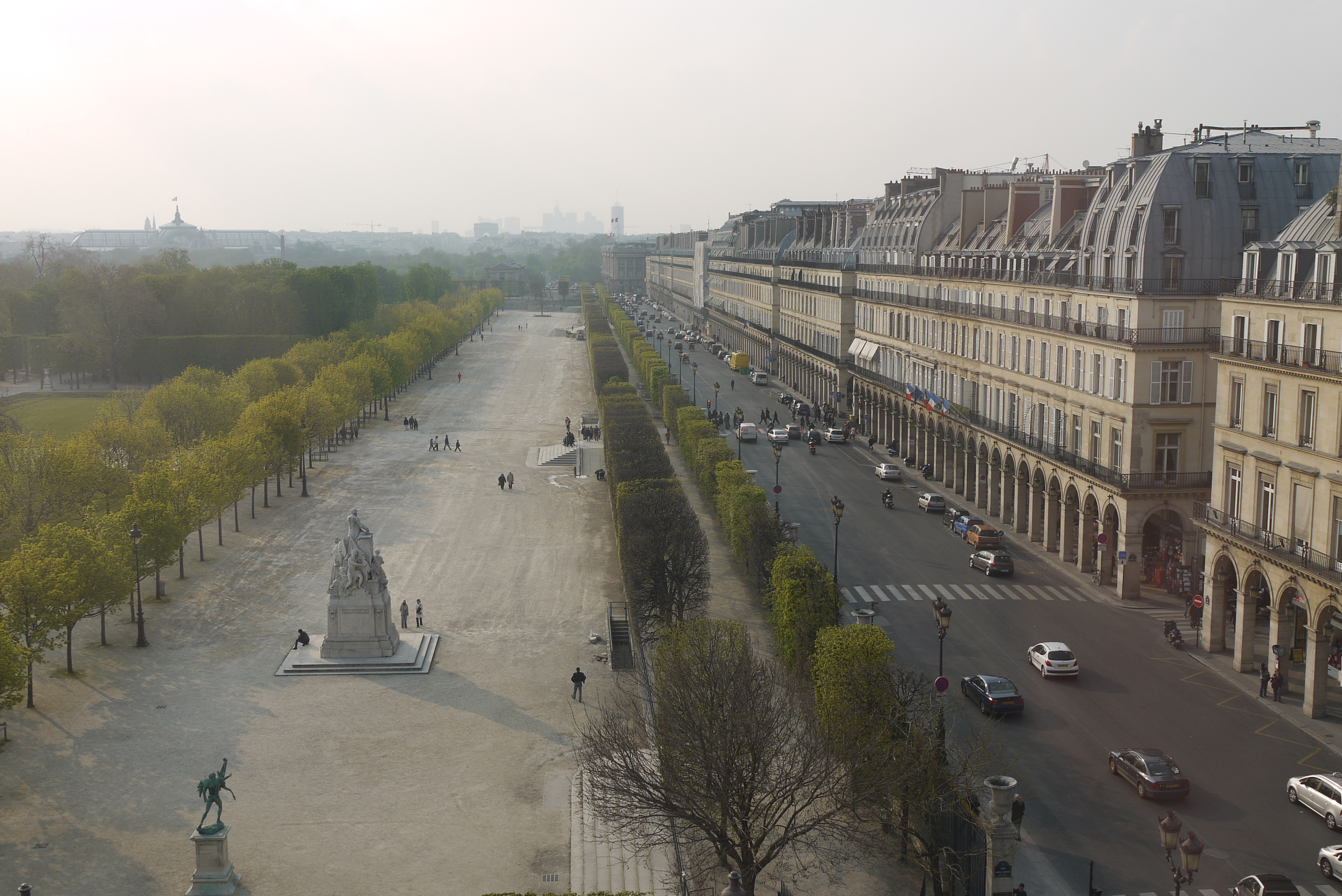
The Esplanade des Feuillants, along the Rue de Rivoli, in winter

The Terrace and Esplanade des Feuillants are parallel wide pathways that runs alongside the Rue de Rivoli on the north side of the garden. The terrace was originally created in the 17th century by André Le Nôtre for Louis XIV; it then separated the garden from a row of convents that bordered the garden. The Convent of the Feuillants an order of nuns, gave the esplanade its name. The convent was closed during the Revolution and turned into a clubhouse for a revolutionary faction called the Feuillants. The wide esplanade alongside it was originally planted with mulberry trees by King Henry IV of France, then with orange trees after the French Revolution. Now the esplanade is left open, and used for large outdoor events or temporary pavilions. It hosts an assortment of 19th and early 20th century statues and monuments.

=== The Octagonal Basin and entrance from to the Place de la Concorde ===
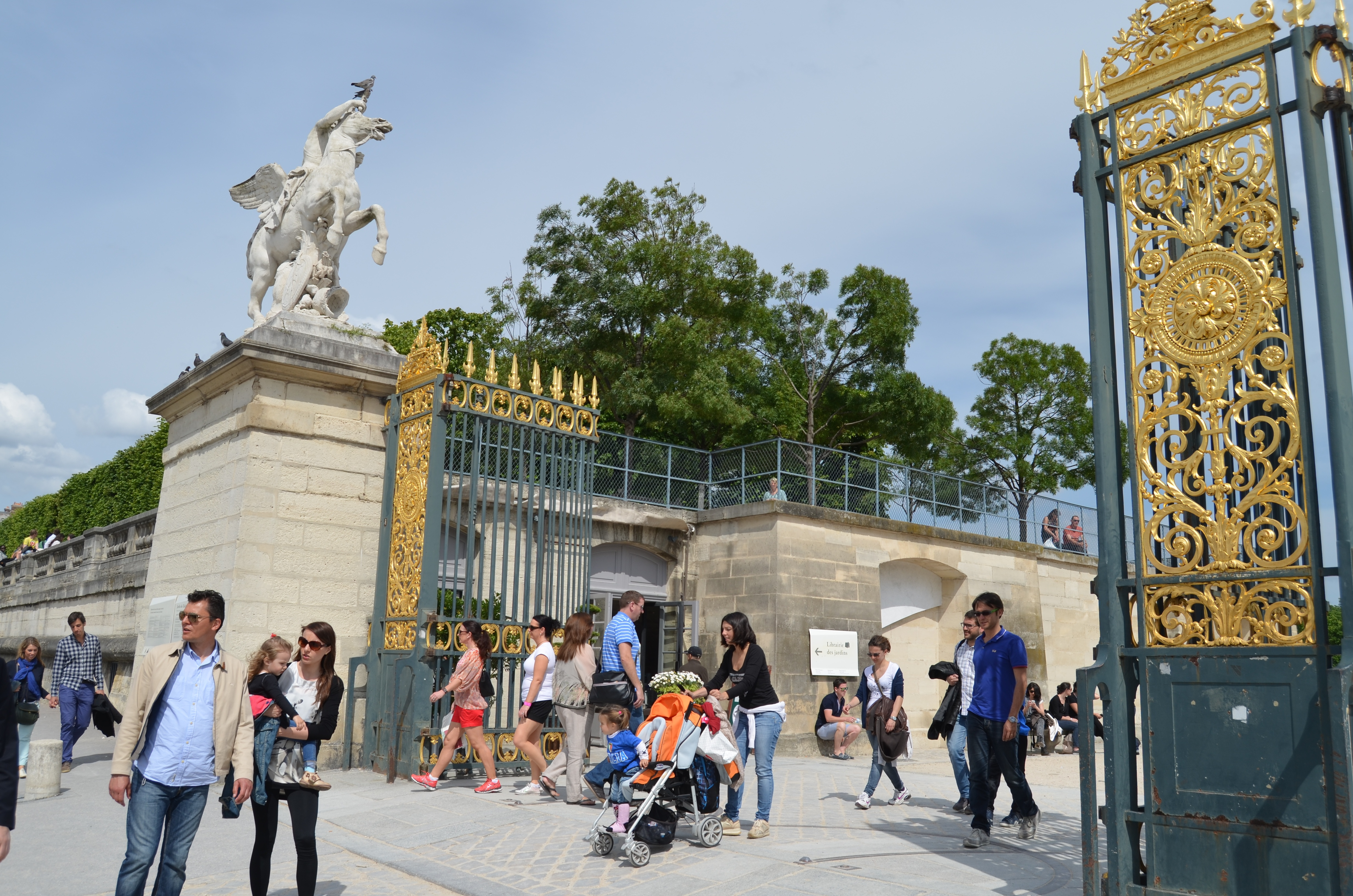
West gateway to the garden, designed by Ange-Jacques Gabriel

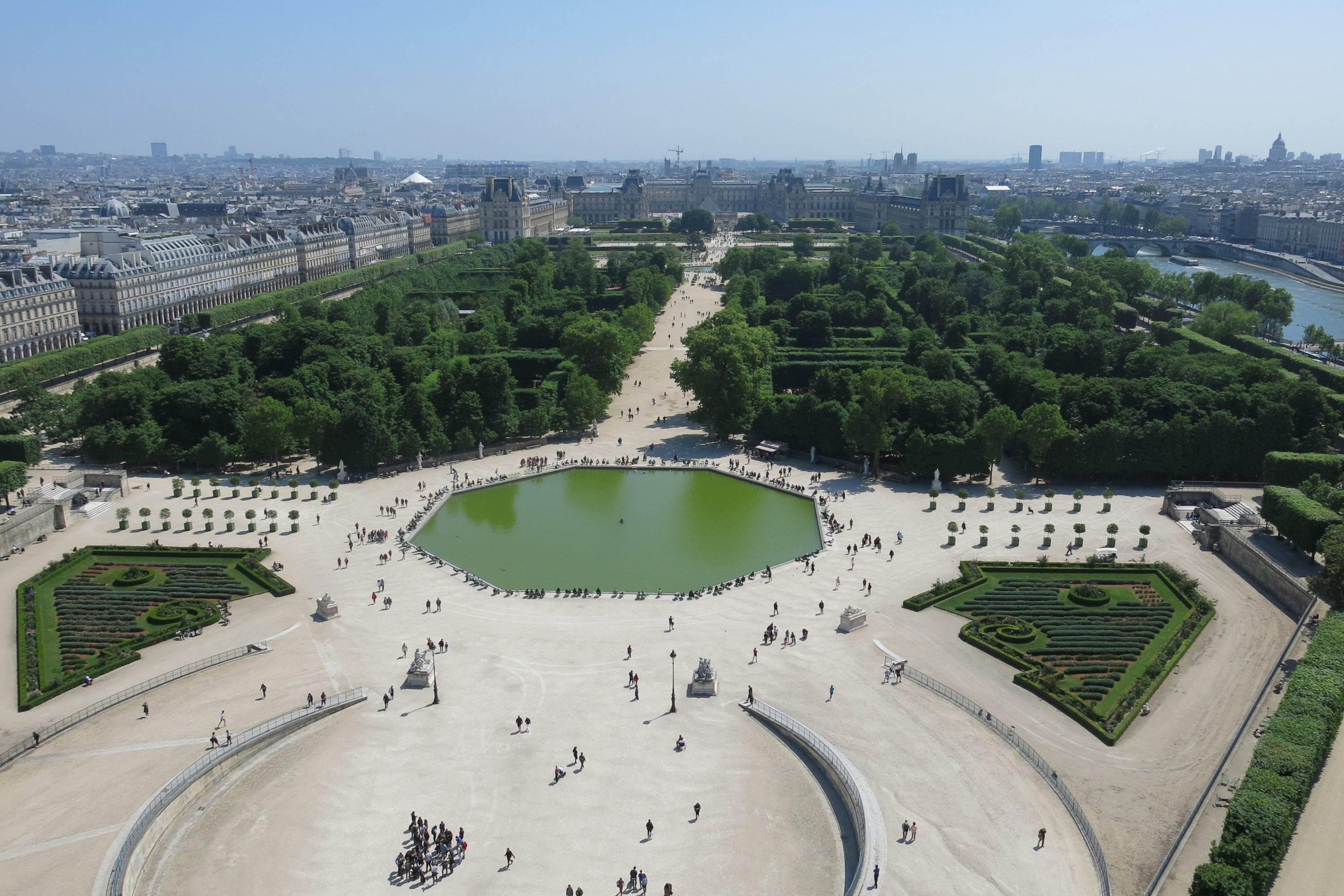
The octagonal basin and the Grand Couvert, looking toward the Louvre

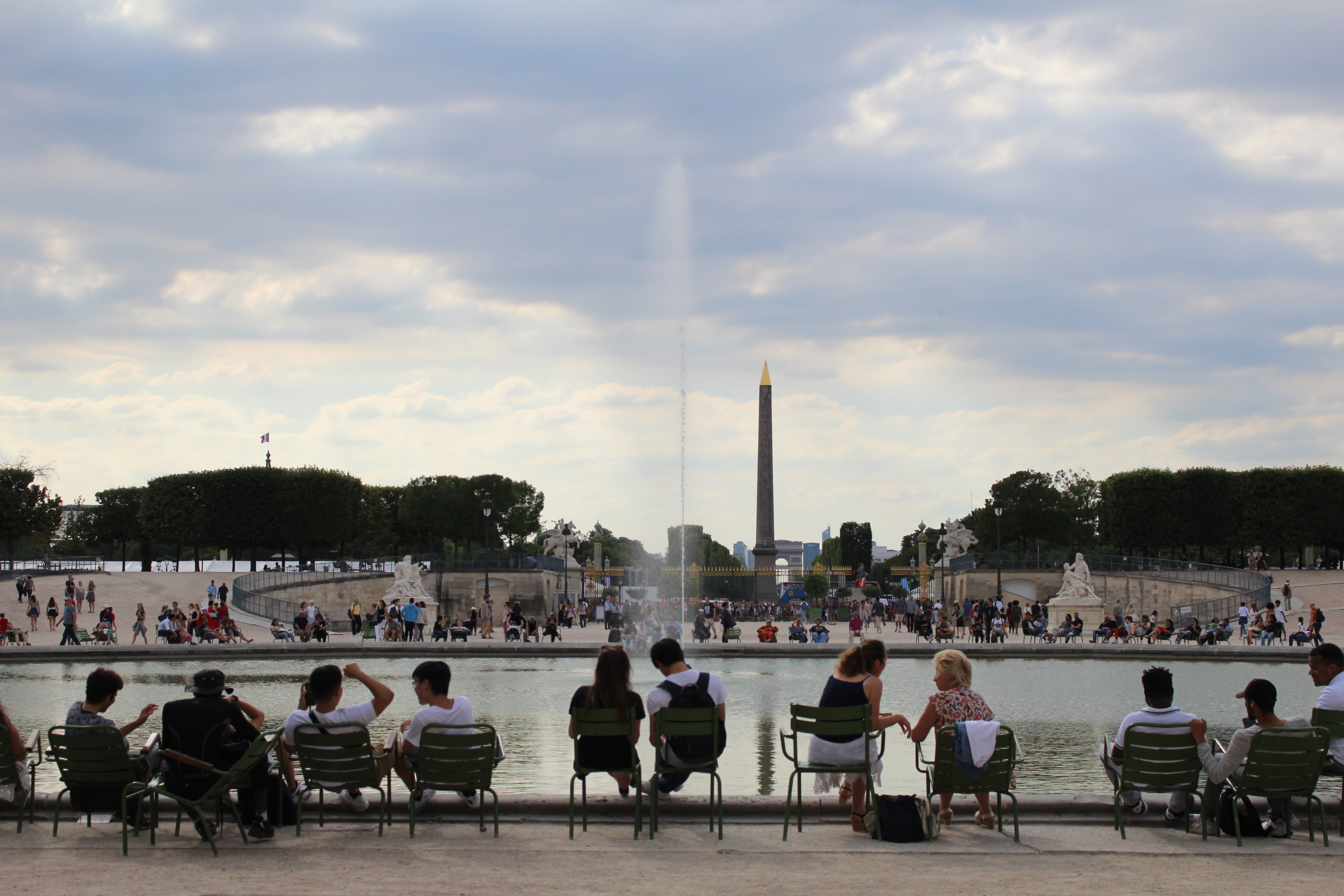
By the octagonal basin, looking toward the Place de la Concorde

The plan of the garden at the west end, adjoining the Place de la Concorde, is similar to that of Le Notre's original plan. The central element is the large octagonal basin, popular with lunching Parisian office workers and children with miniature sailboats. Two horseshoe-shaped ramps give access to the terraces overlooking the Place del la Concorde. During the French Restoration period in the early 19th century it became known as the "Petite Provence", because of the pensioned soldiers who passed the hours in the sunshine there.

The architecture and the ornate grill of the gateway to the garden were crested beginning in 1757 by Ange-Jacques Gabriel, the royal architect of Louis XV, and designer of the Place de La Concorde and its fountains, obelisk and surrounding buildings.

The octagonal basin is surrounded by group of statues installed there in the 18th century. They include allegorical works depicting the four seasons, alternating with heroic figures from Ancient Rome, including Julius Caesar, Hannibal, and Agrippina. These are copies; the originals are in the Louvre.

=== The Orangerie, the Jeu de Paume, and West Terrace of the Tuileries ===
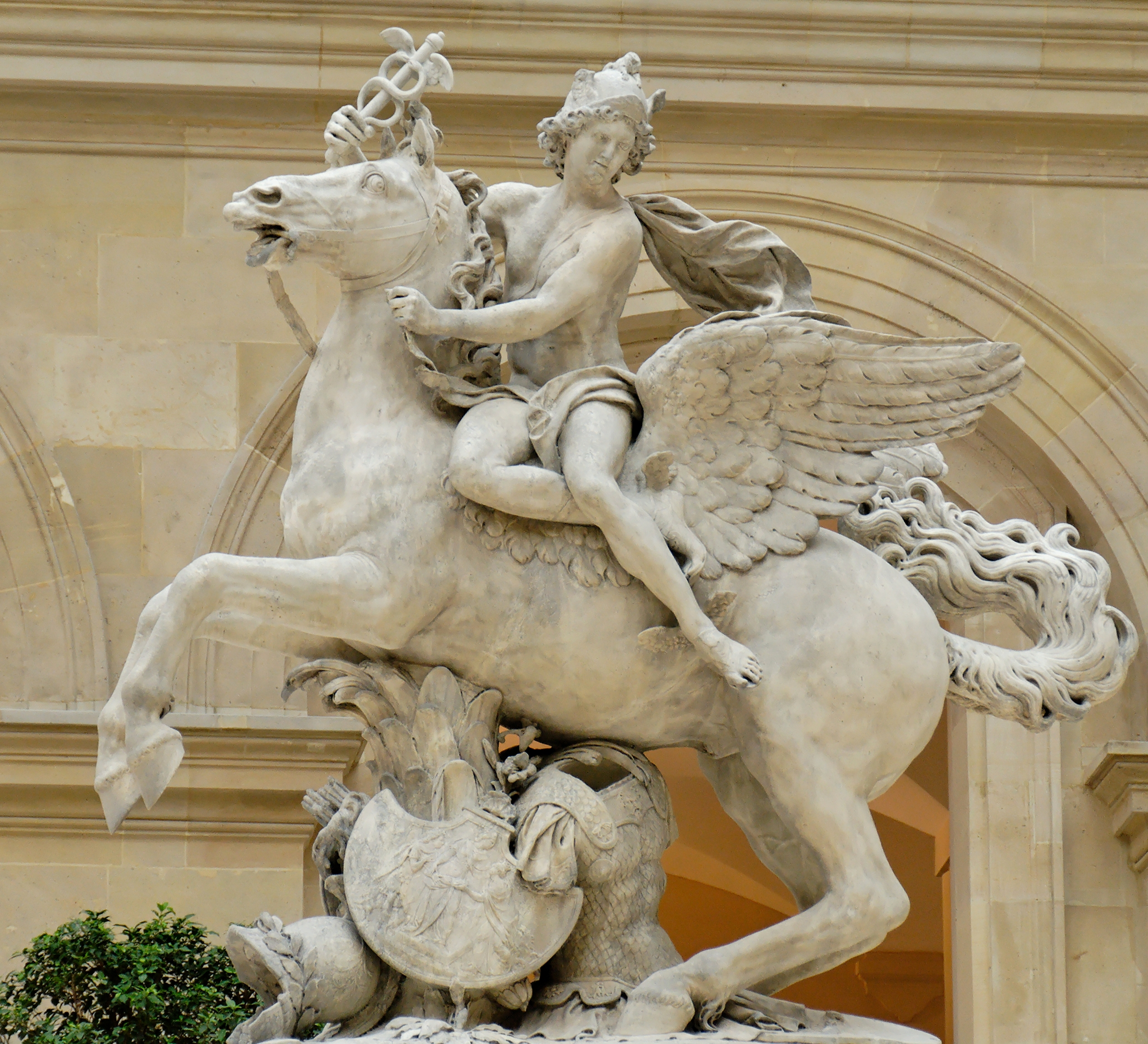
Mercury riding Pegasus, (1701–02) by Antoine Coysevox (1640–1720). Originally at Marly, moved to the Tuileries in 1719 and placed at the west gate of the garden. In 1986 the original of marble was moved to the Louvre and replaced by a copy

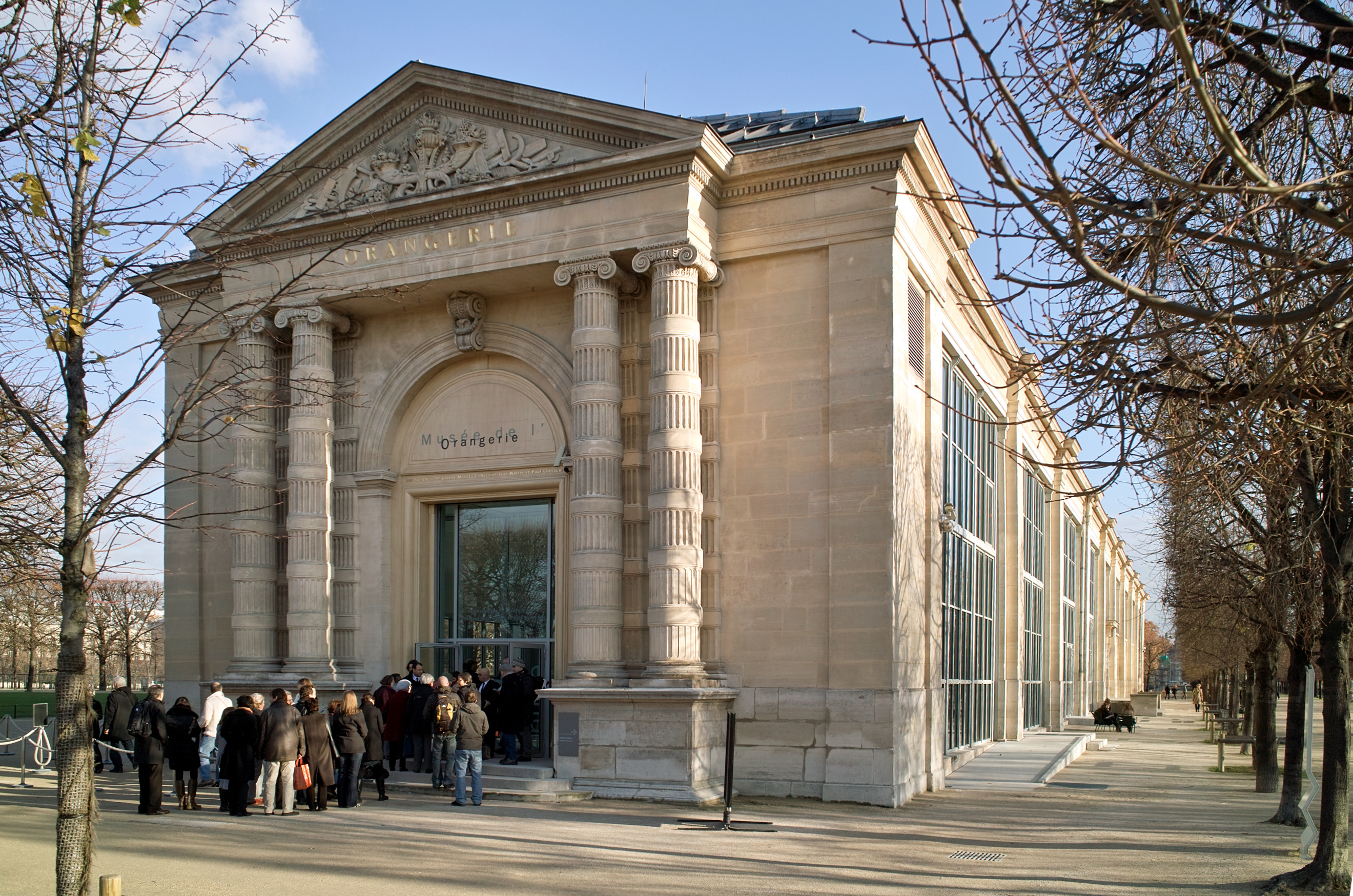
Musée de l'Orangerie, a greenhouse converted to a gallery for Monet's Water Lilies

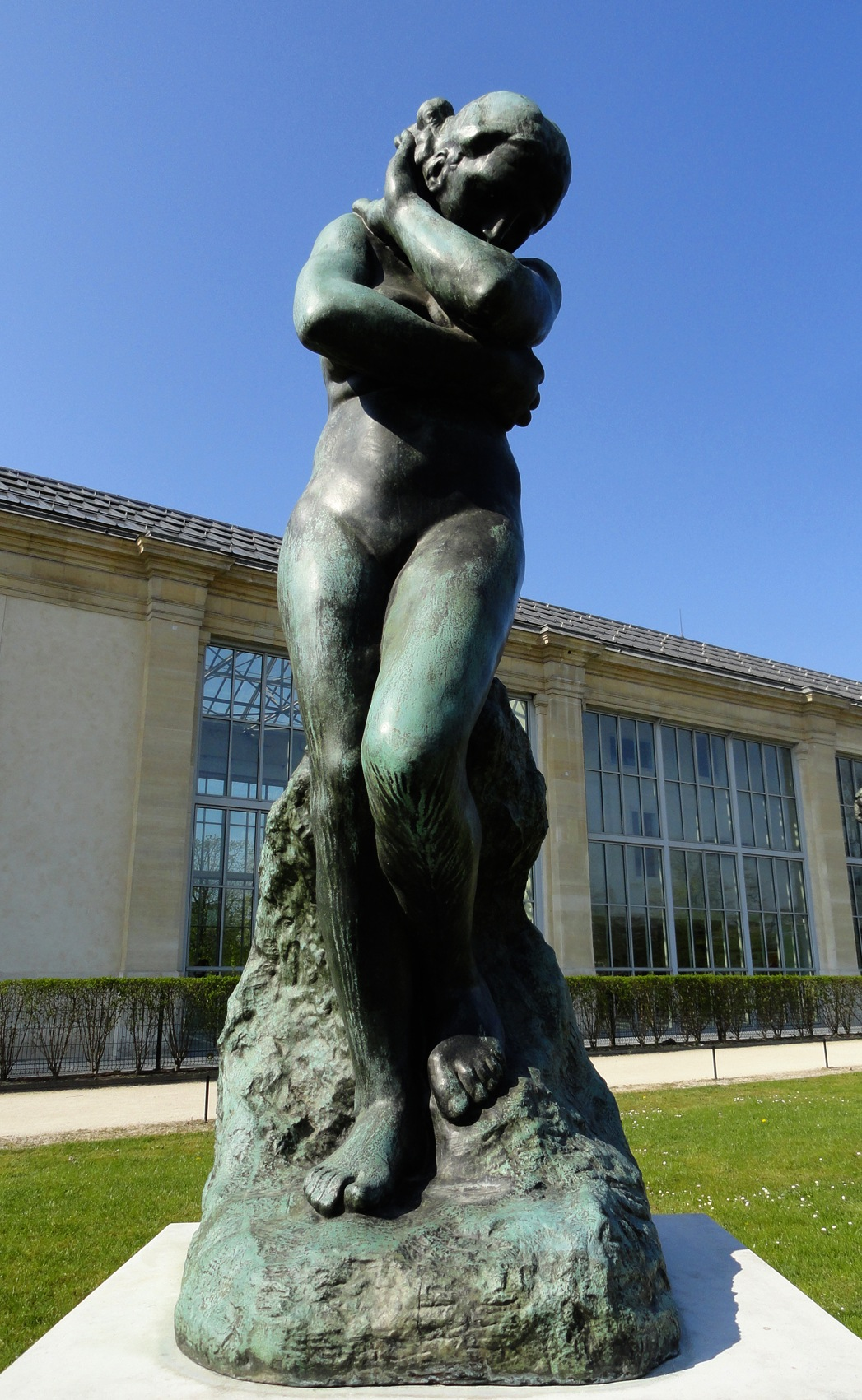
Eve by Auguste Rodin, 1881–ca.1899, next to the Orangerie

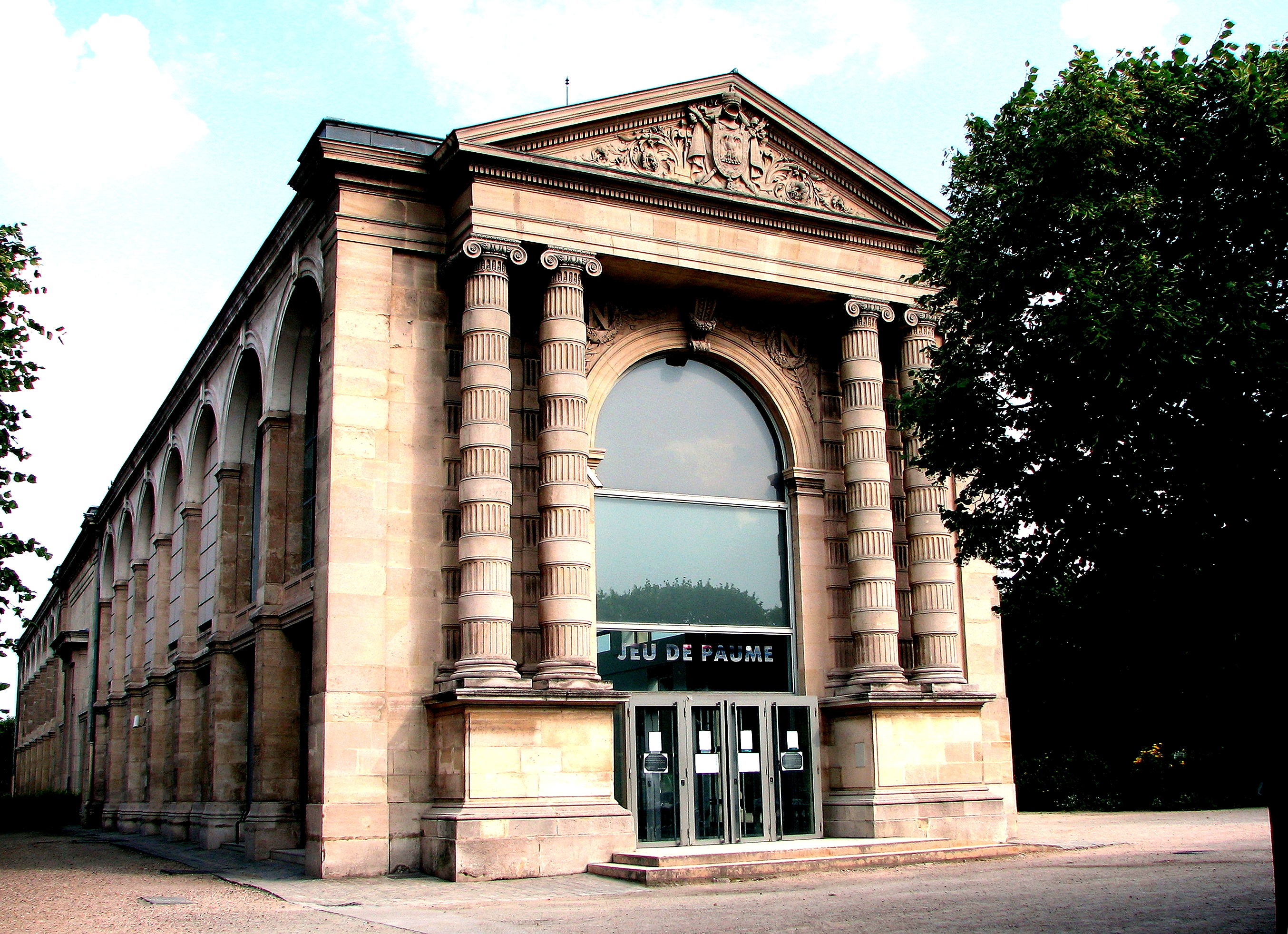
National Gallery of the Jeu de Paume, a tennis court turned into an art gallery

The two western terraces of the garden overlook the Place de la Concorde, and are separated by the formal entrance and central axis of the garden. The terrace by the Seine is close to the old western gateway of Paris, the Porte de la Conference, which was built by Henry III of France in the 16th century, and was in place until 1720. In the 17th century the terrace was occupied by a famous cabaret, la Garenne de Renard. Now it is home to the Musée de l'Orangerie, which was first built in 1852 under Napoleon III by the architect Firmin Bourgeois to shelter citrus trees during the winter. Since 1927 its main attraction has been a series of eight of Claude Monet's Water Lilies series. It also displays the Walter-Guillaume collection of Impressionist painting.

The terrace of the Orangerie displays four works of sculpture by Auguste Rodin: The Kiss (1881–1898); Eve (1881) and La Grande Ombre (1880) and La Meditation avec bras (1881–1905). It also has a modern work, Grand Commandement blanc (1986) by Alain Kirili.

On the north of the garden, alongside the Rue de Rivoli, is the Galerie nationale du Jeu de Paume. It was originally a court for the sport of Jeu de paume, a form on indoor tennis. It was built in 1861 under Napoleon III and enlarged in 1878. It became an annex of the Musée du Luxembourg dedicated to contemporary art from outside France. It held a large collection of impressionist art from 1947 until 1986, when these works were transferred to the new Musee d'Orsay. In 1927 it became an annex of the Luxembourg Museum for the display of modern and contemporary art.

The terrace in front of the Jeu de Paume displays a notable work of modern sculpture, Le Belle Constumé, by 20th century artist Jean Dubuffet.

== Art and sculpture ==
Since the first garden of Marie de Medicis in the 17th century, the Tuileries has been used to display art and sculpture. The most famous examples are the water lilies series by Claude Monet within the Musée de l'Orangerie on the terrace by the Place de la Concorde. The Galerie nationale du Jeu de Paume, on the northwest corner of the terrace closer to the Rue de Rivoli, presents changing exhibits of modern and contemporary art, including photography and other media. The gallery on the upper floor is lit by natural light.

The park also displays a wide variety of garden sculptures dating back to the period of Louis XIV. Many of the present classical works are copies, with the originals inside the Louvre.

=== Painting ===
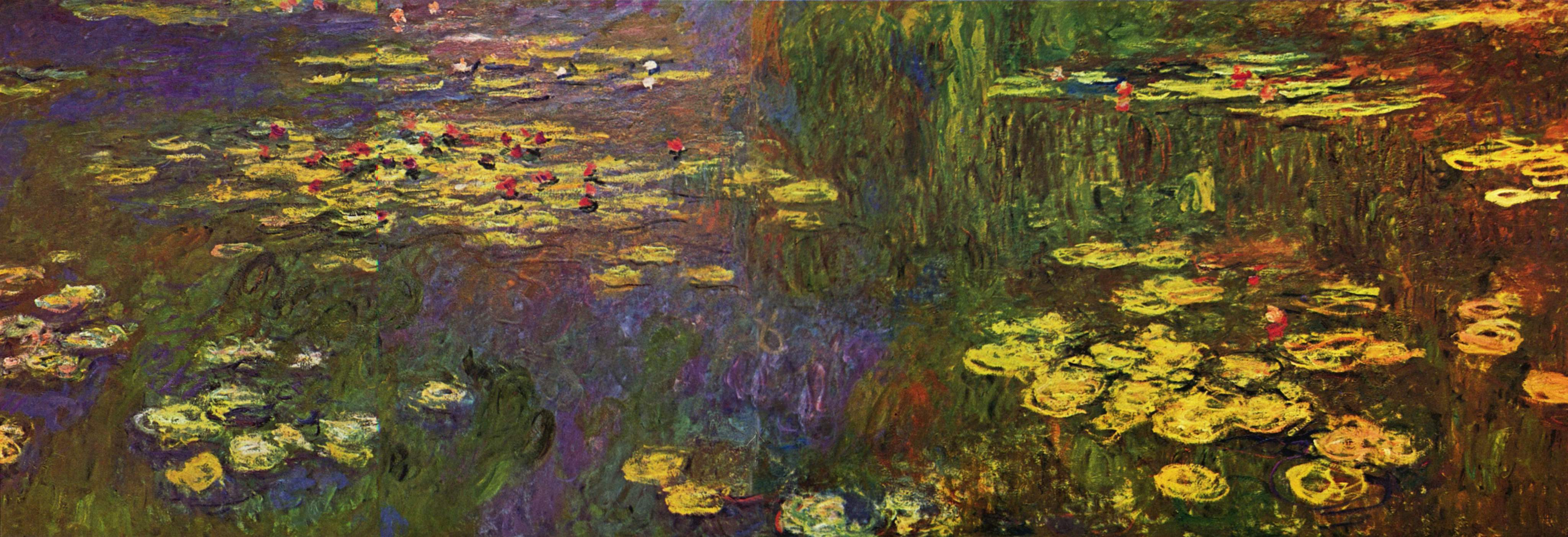
Detail of one of the eight Les Nymphéas (Water Lilies) by Claude Monet, put into the Orangerie in 1927

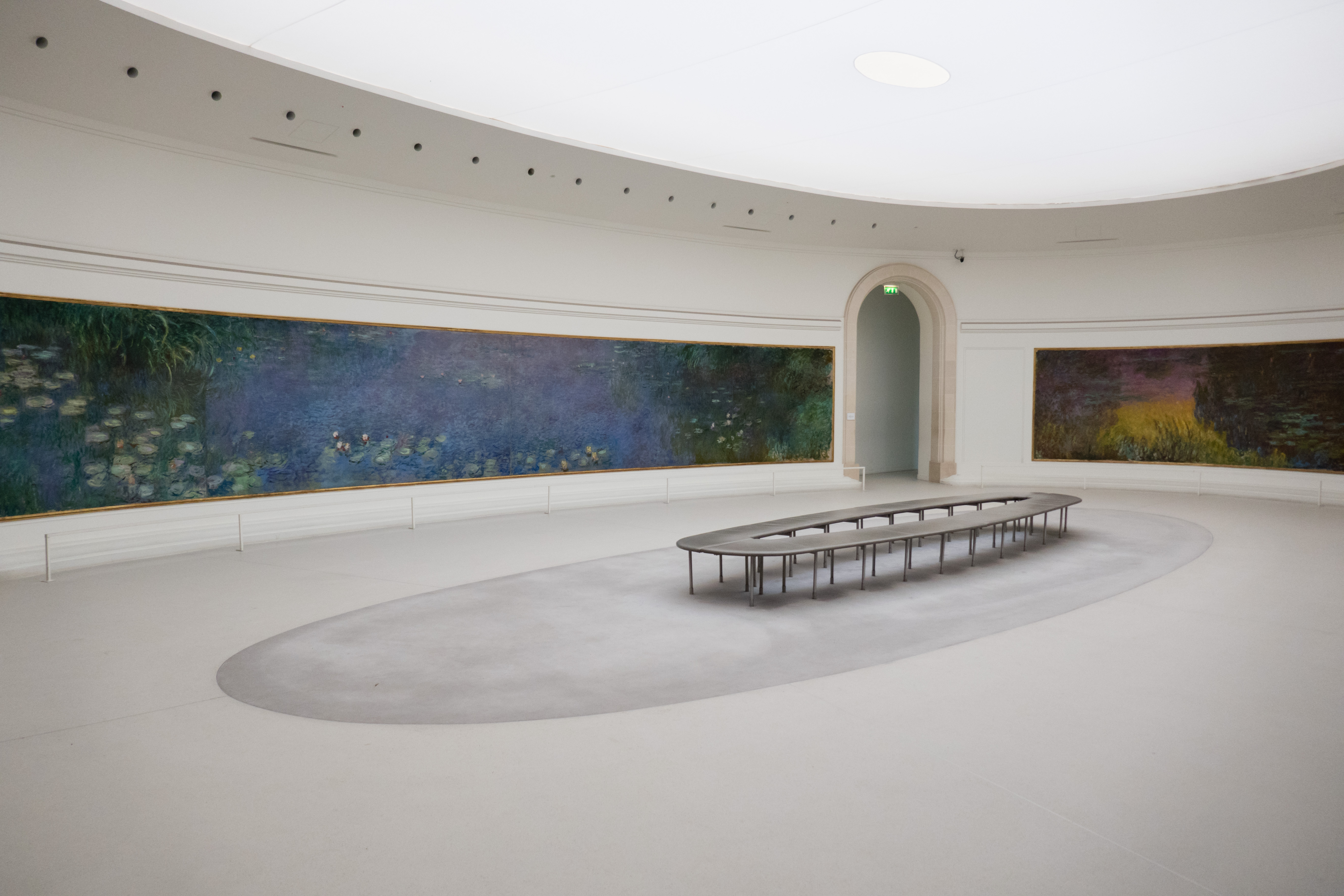
Water Lilies Room of the Musée de l'Orangerie

=== 17th–18th century sculpture ===
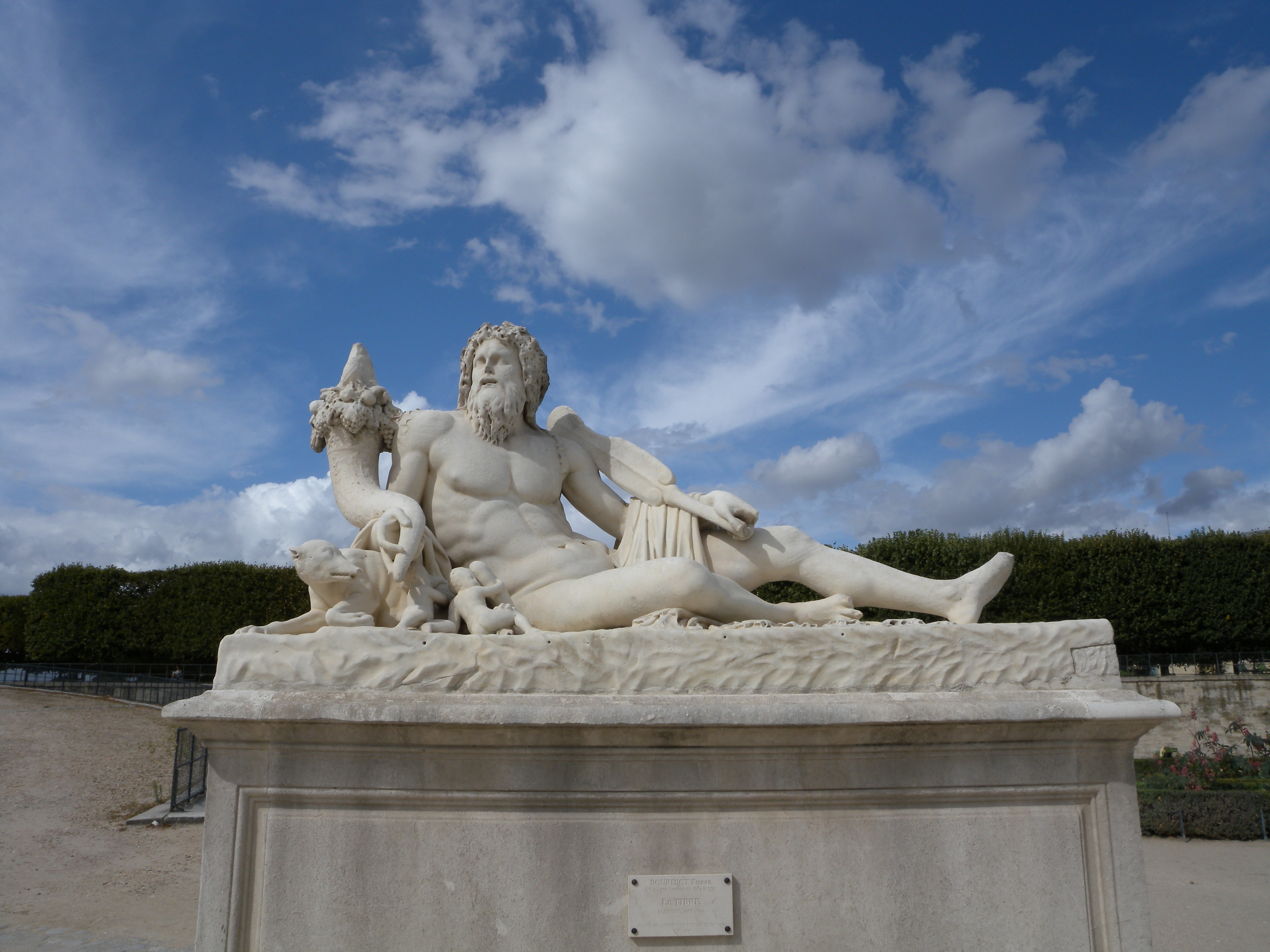
The Tiber by Pierre Bourdict (1685–1690)

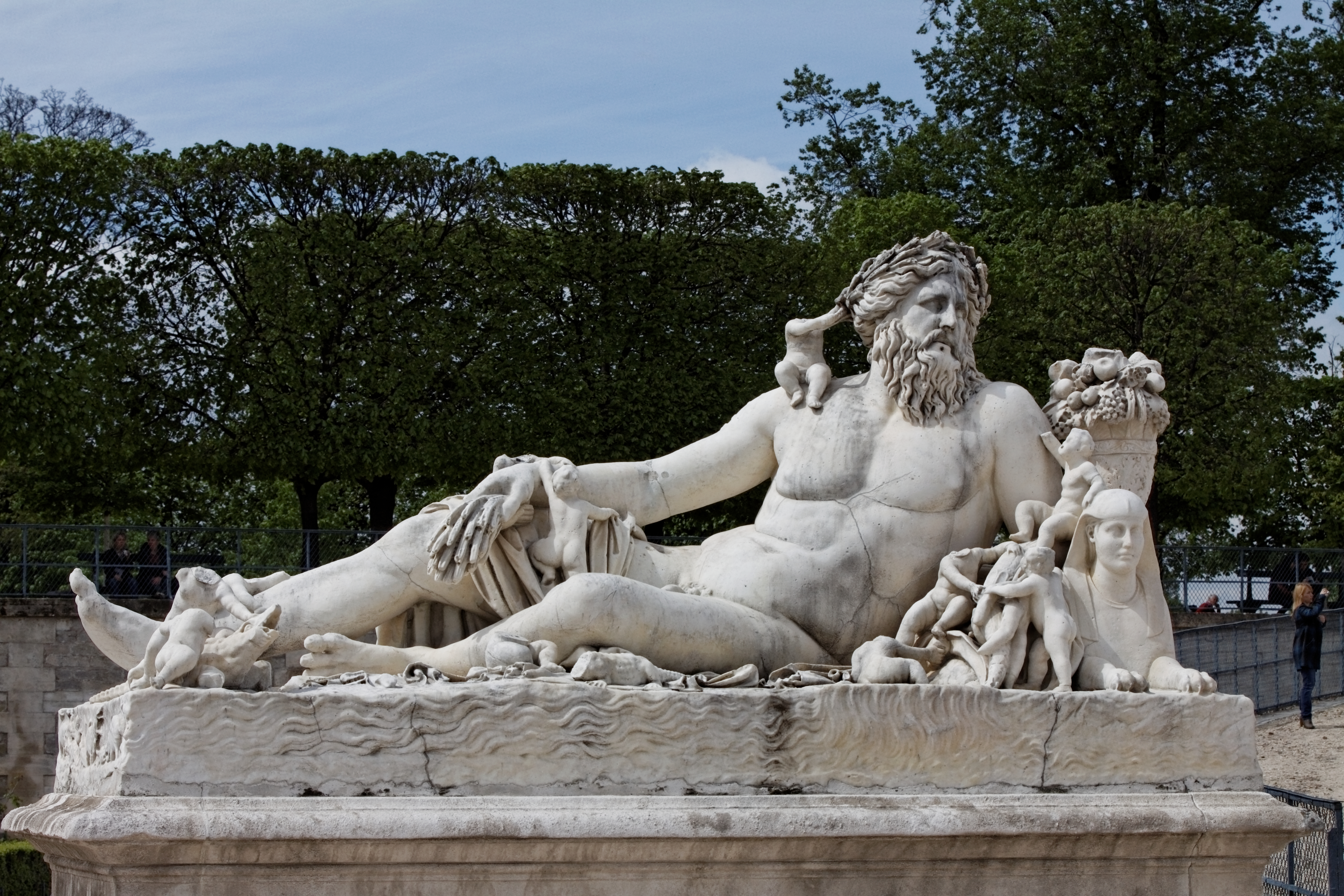
The Nile by Lorenzo Ottoni (1687–1692), ramp to the Orangerie

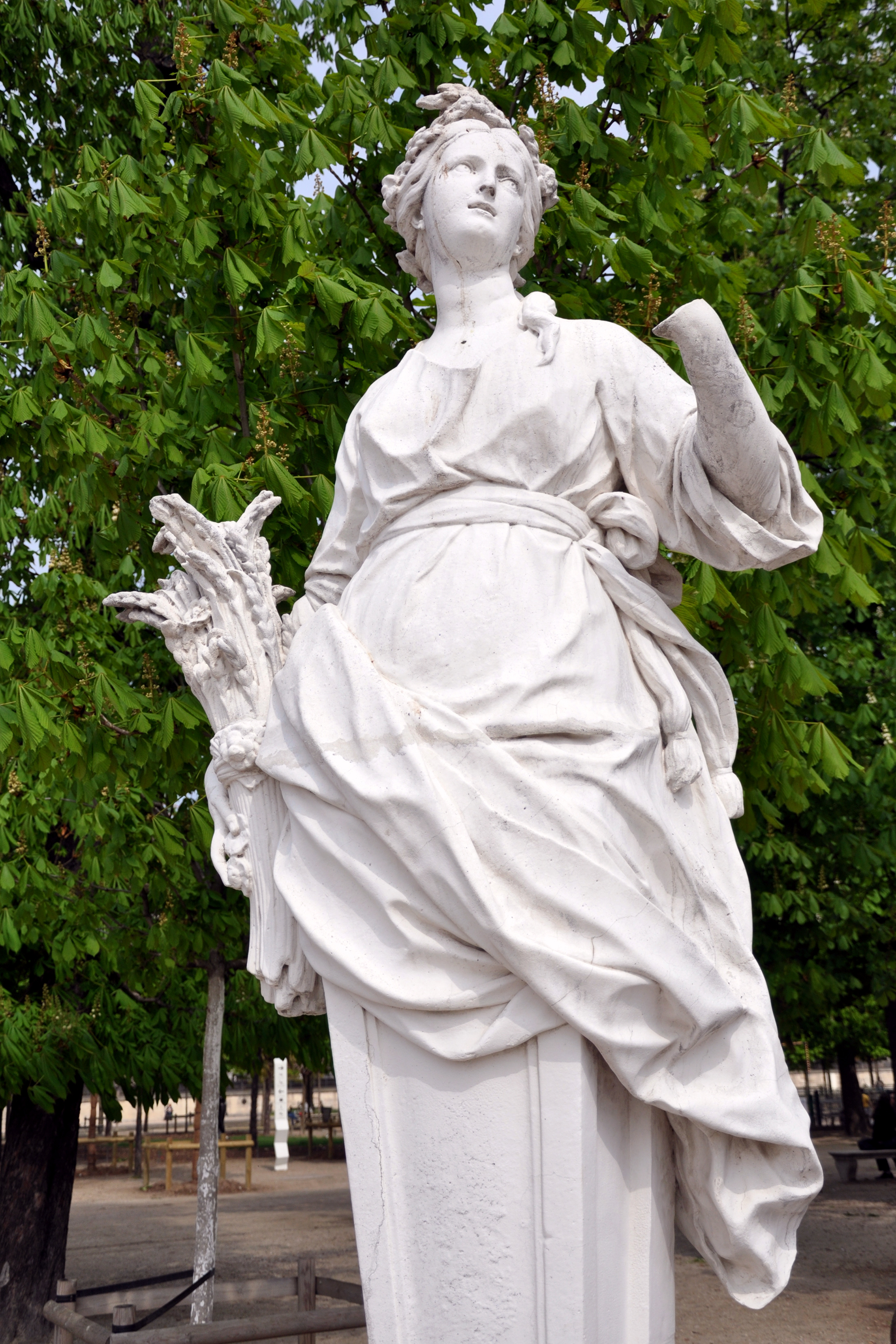
Summer, near the Grand Octagonal Basin. Copy of a work by François Barois (the original is in the Louvre)

In 1719, four monumental sculptures were installed at the base of the ramps leading up to the Orangerie and the Jeu de Paume. All four are allegorical representations of rivers; Two are late-17th century originals; They represent The Tiber (by Pierre Bourdict (made 1685–1690)); The Nile by Lorenzo Ottoni (1687–1692); The other two depict The Seine and the Marine, and The Loire and the Loiret and are copies of 18th century works.

=== 19th century sculpture ===
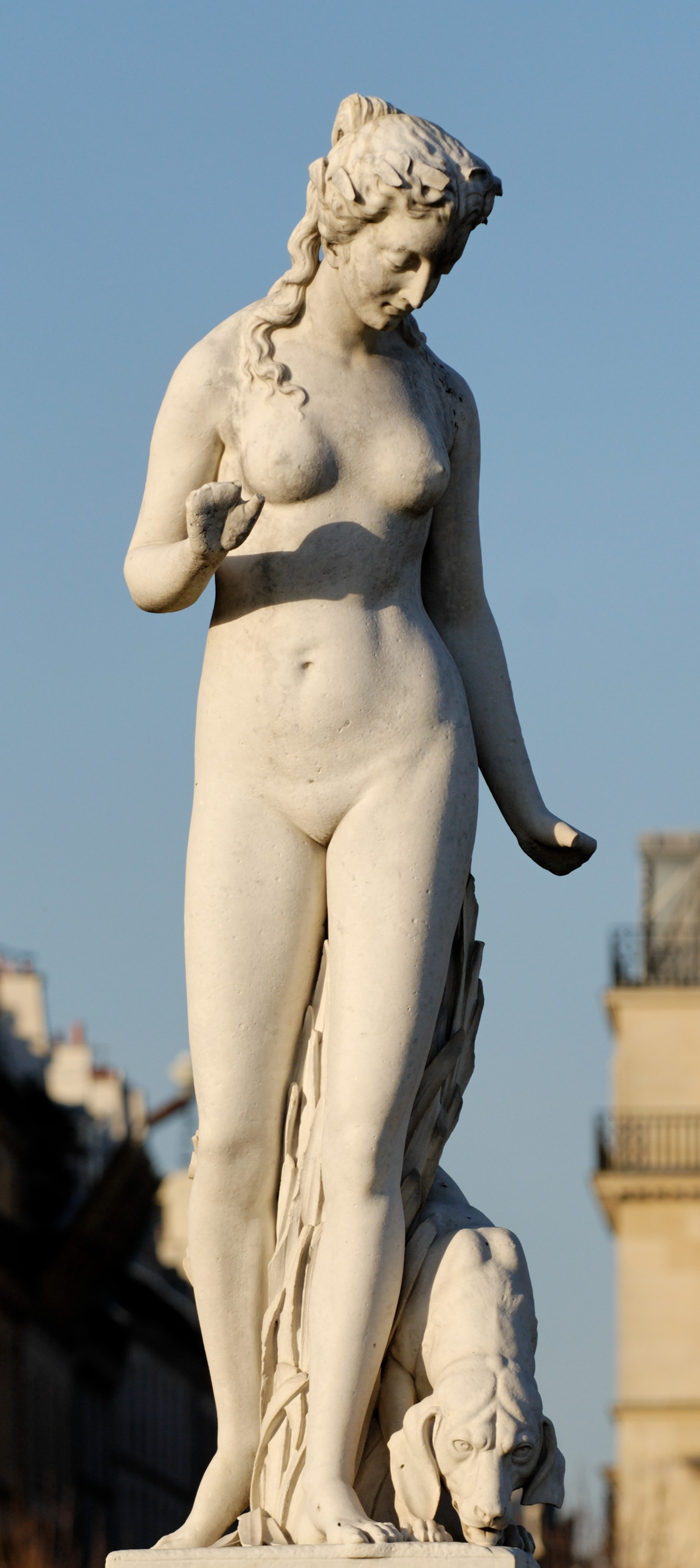
Nymphe by Auguste Levêque, (1866). In the Grand Carré, at the beginning of the Grand Allée

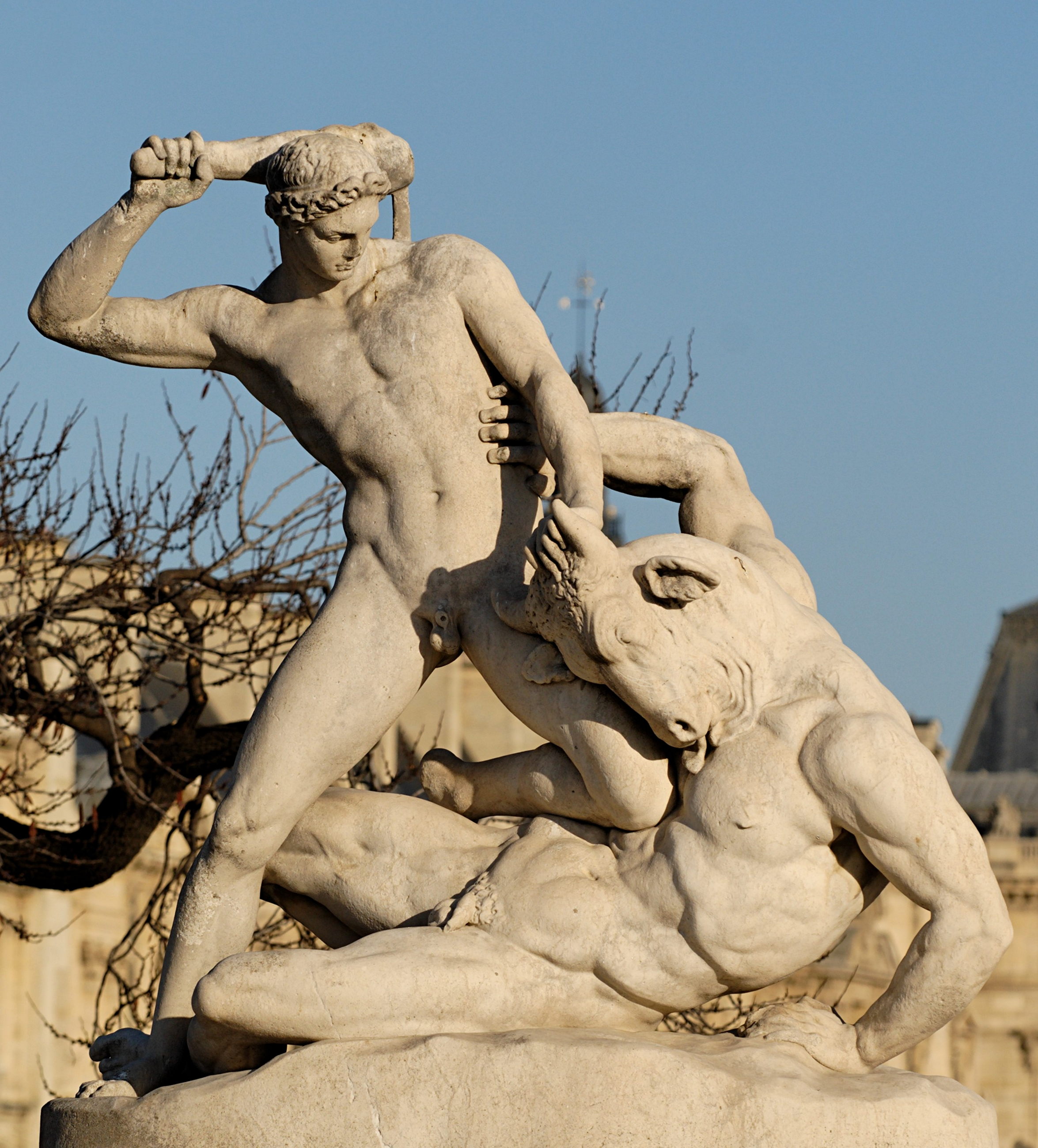
Theseus and the Minotaur (1826) by Jules Ramey, in the Grand Carré

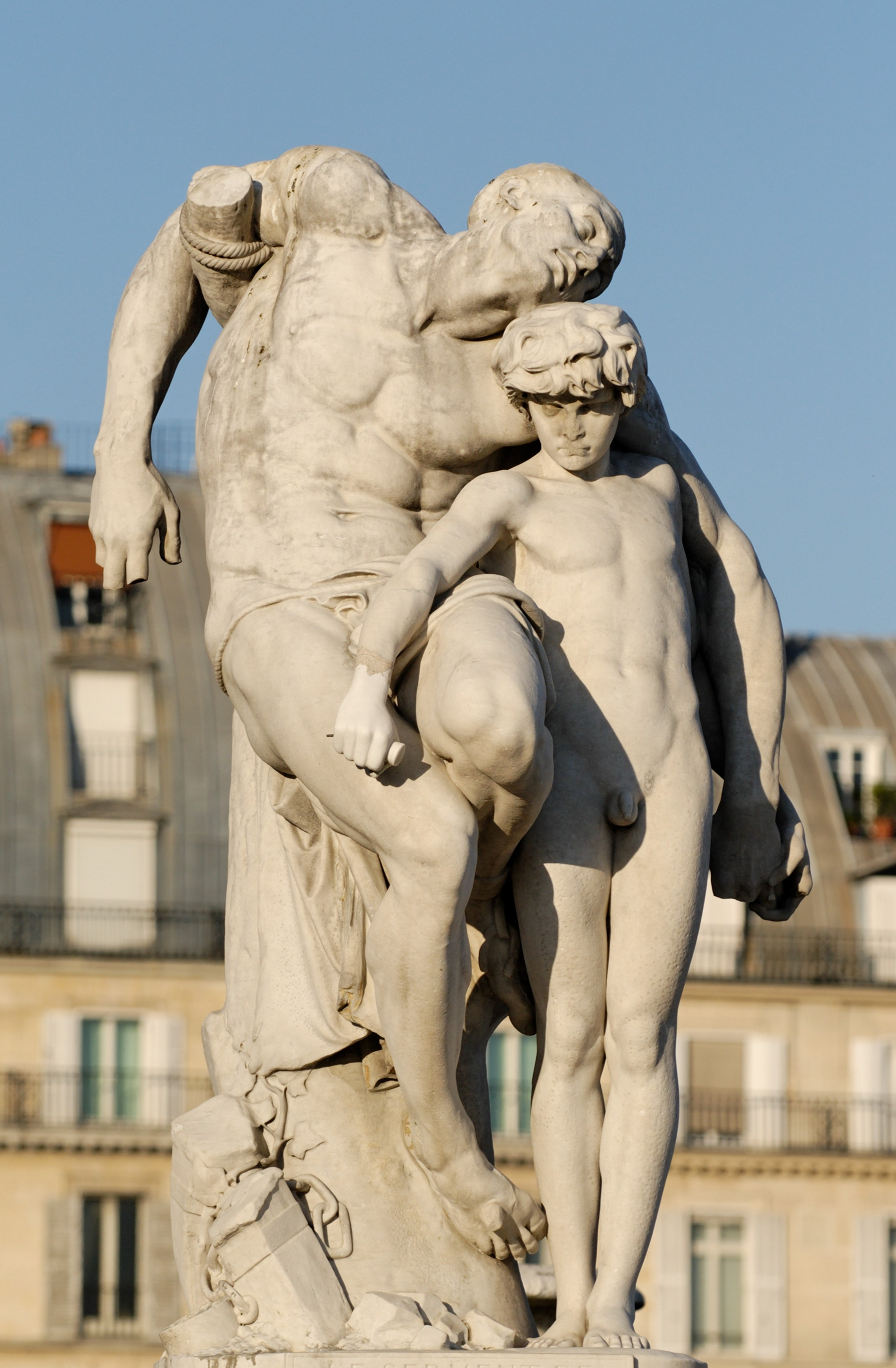
The Oath of Spartacus (1871) by Louis-Ernest Barrias (1841–1905)

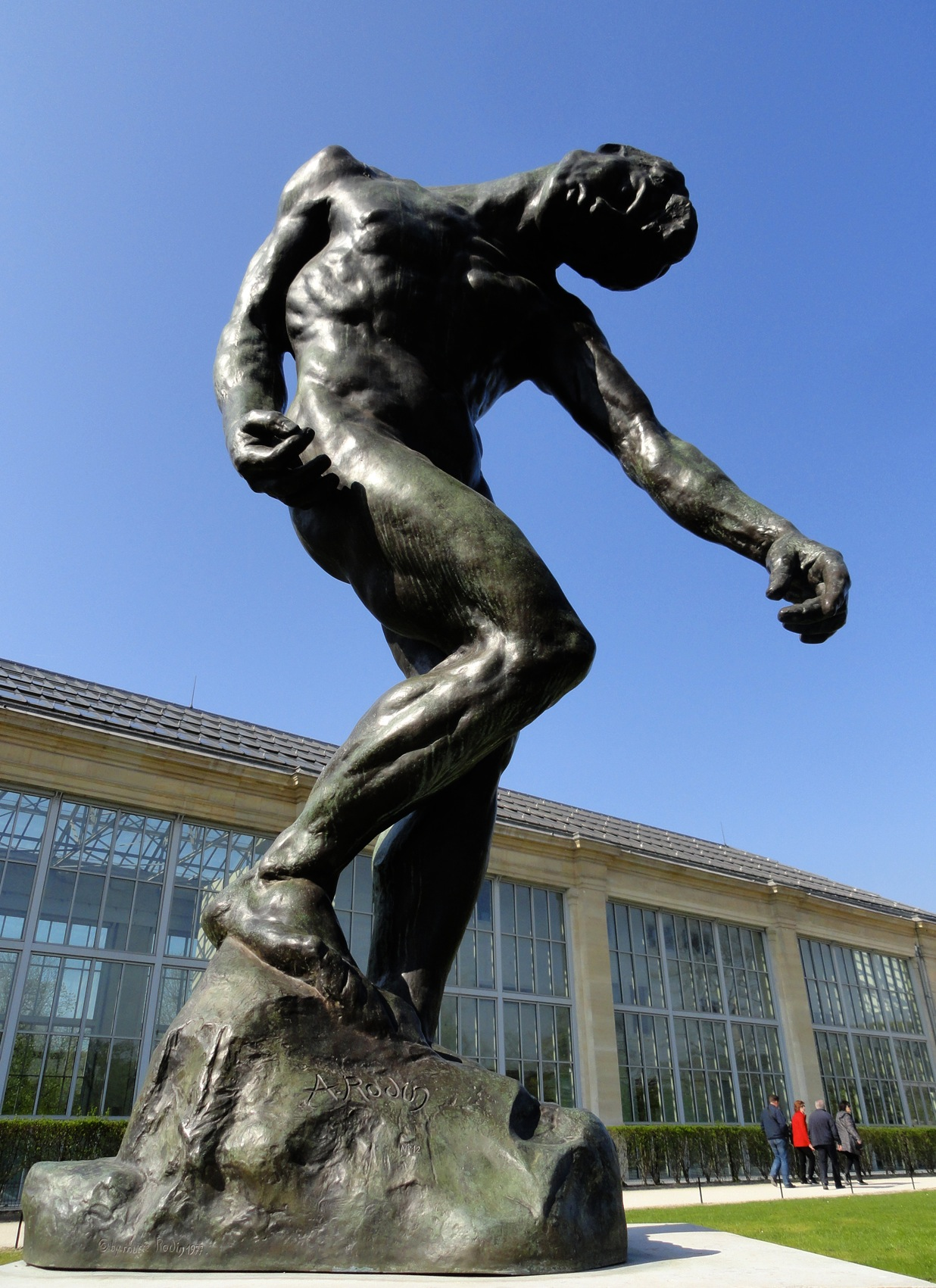
Auguste Rodin, 1881–1904, L'Ombre (The Shade), bronze (West terrace)

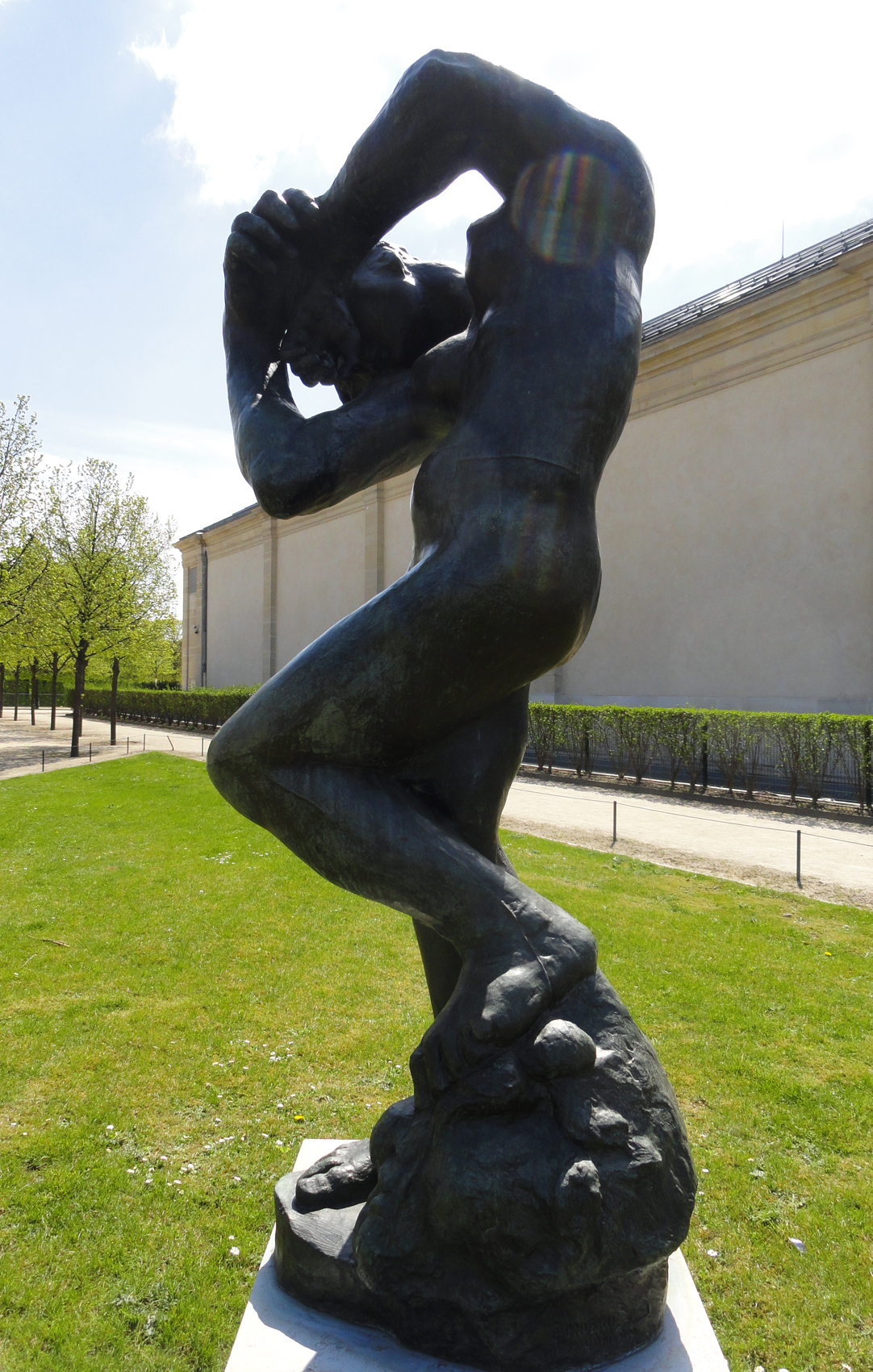
Auguste Rodin, 1881 – ca. 1905, Méditation avec bras, bronze

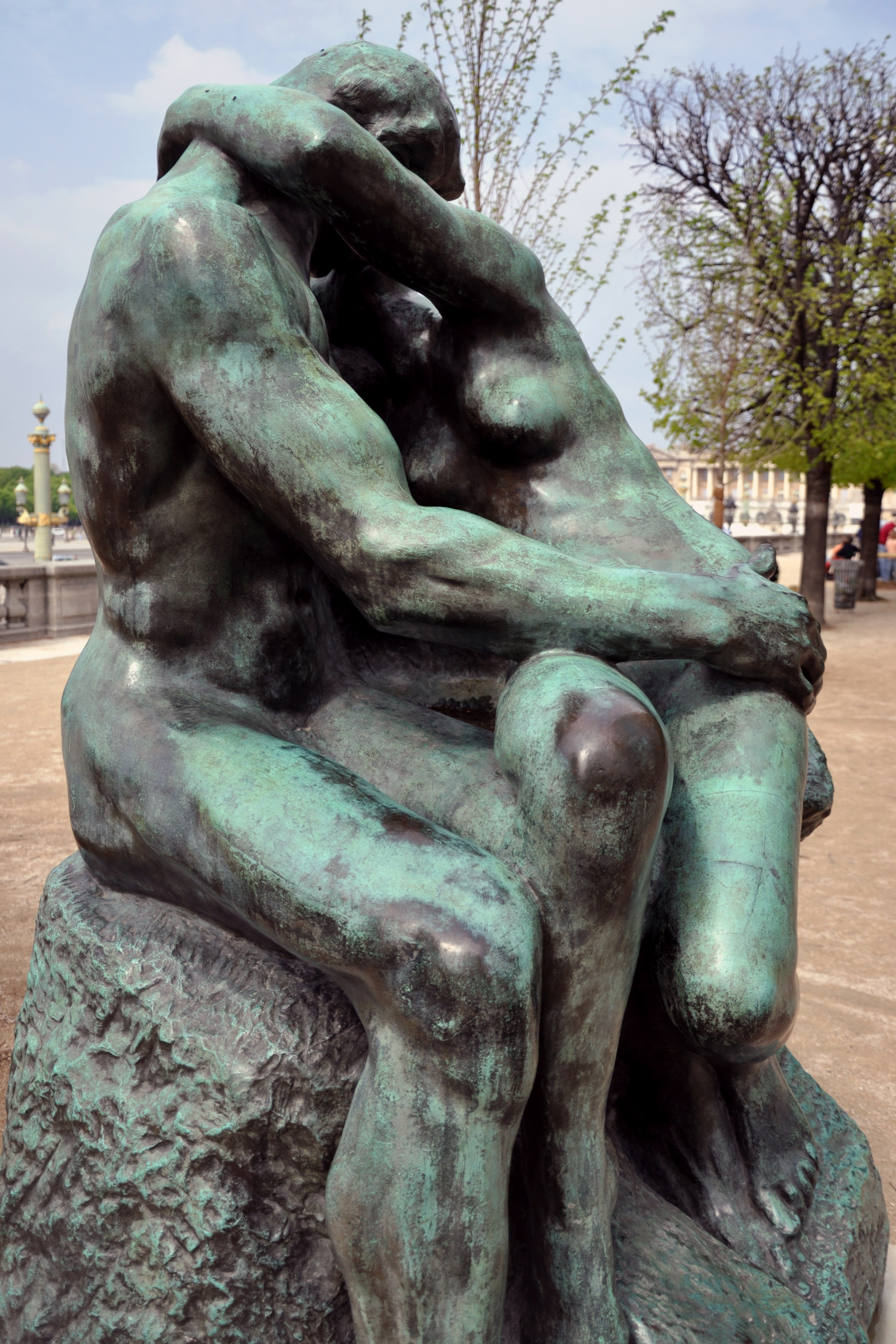
The Kiss by Auguste Rodin, (1934 cast of the marble original), West Terrace

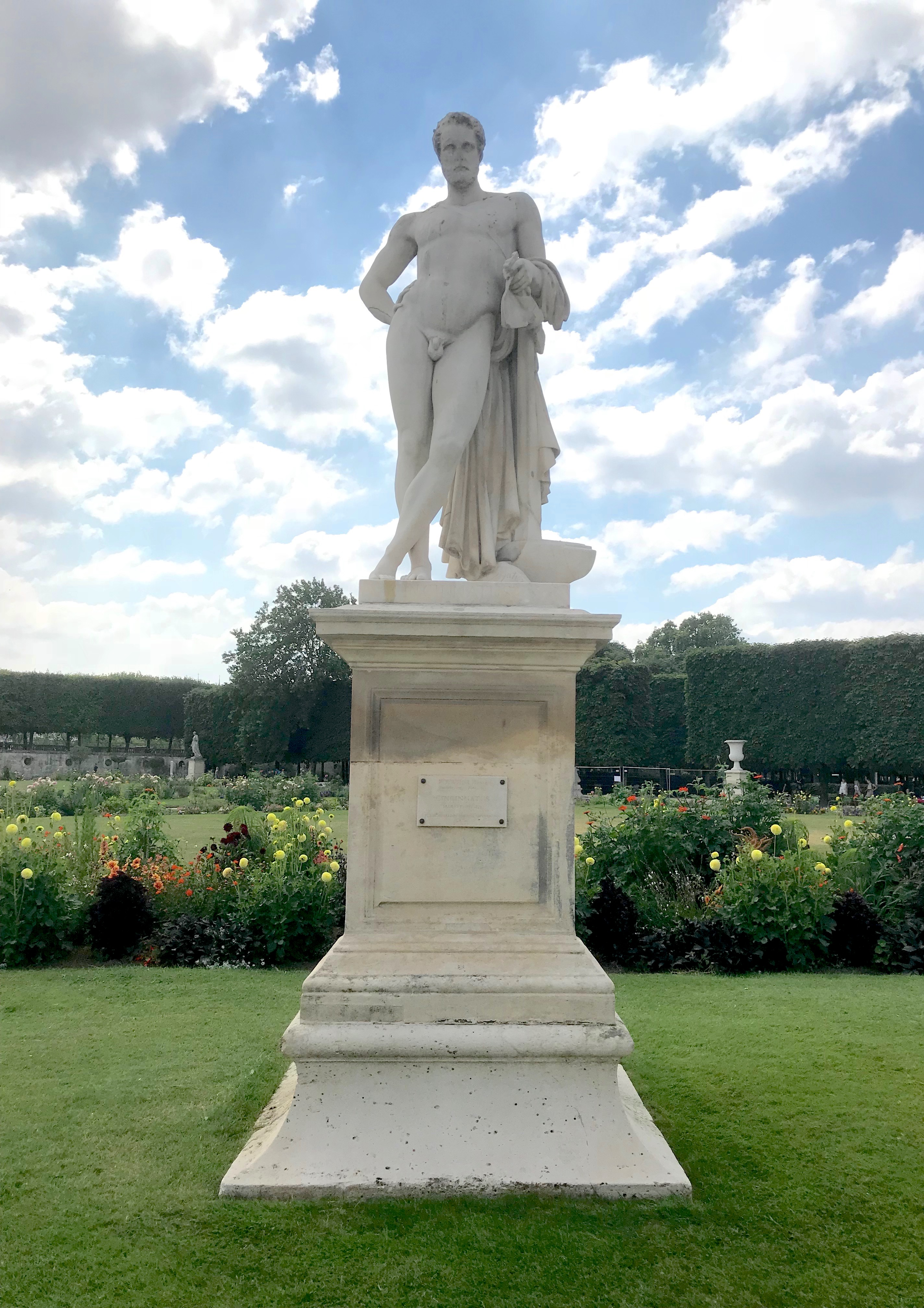
Lucius Quinctius Cincinnatus by Denis Foyatier (1793–1863)

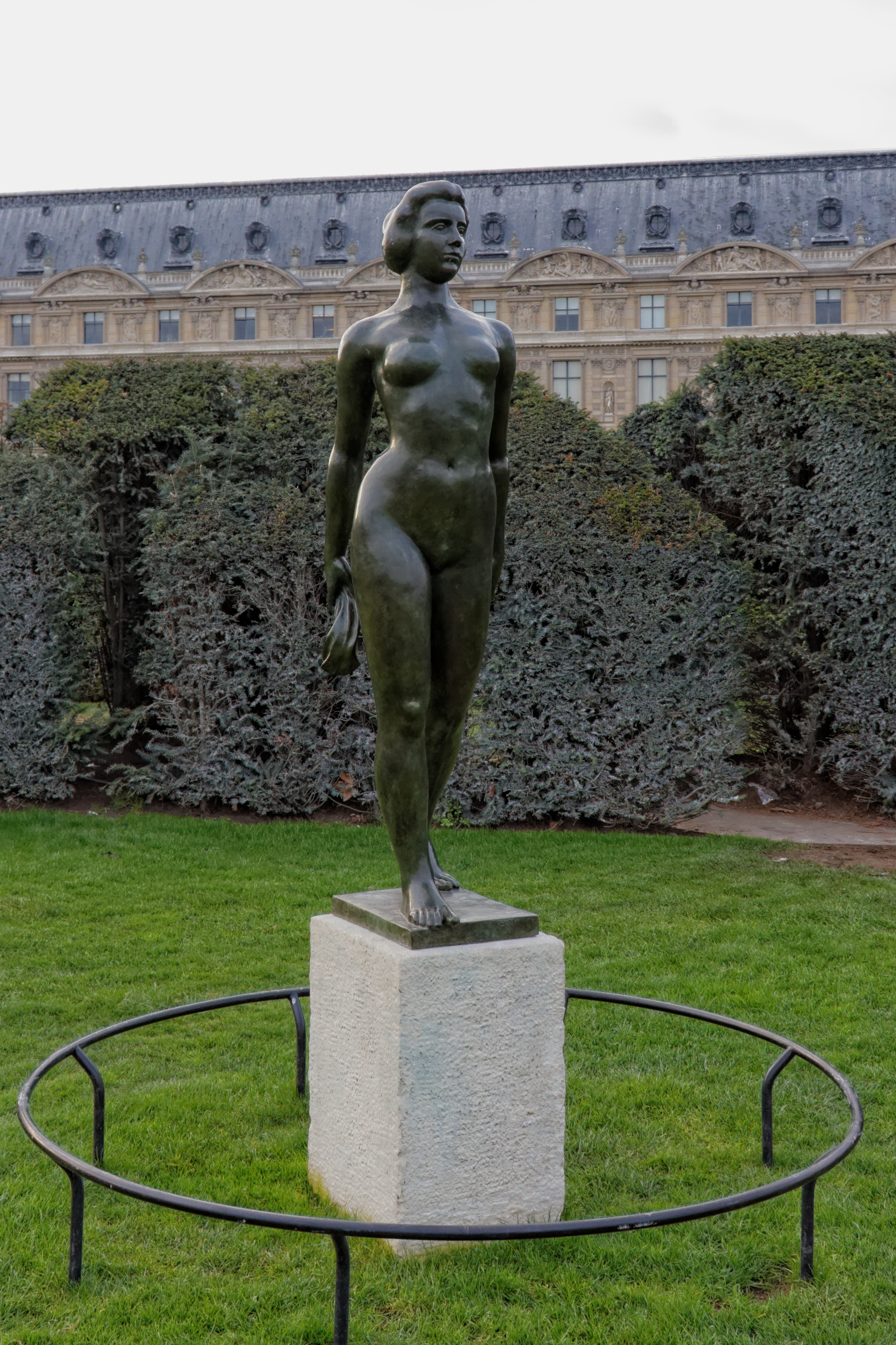
Ile de France by Aristide Maillol in the Jardin du Carrousel

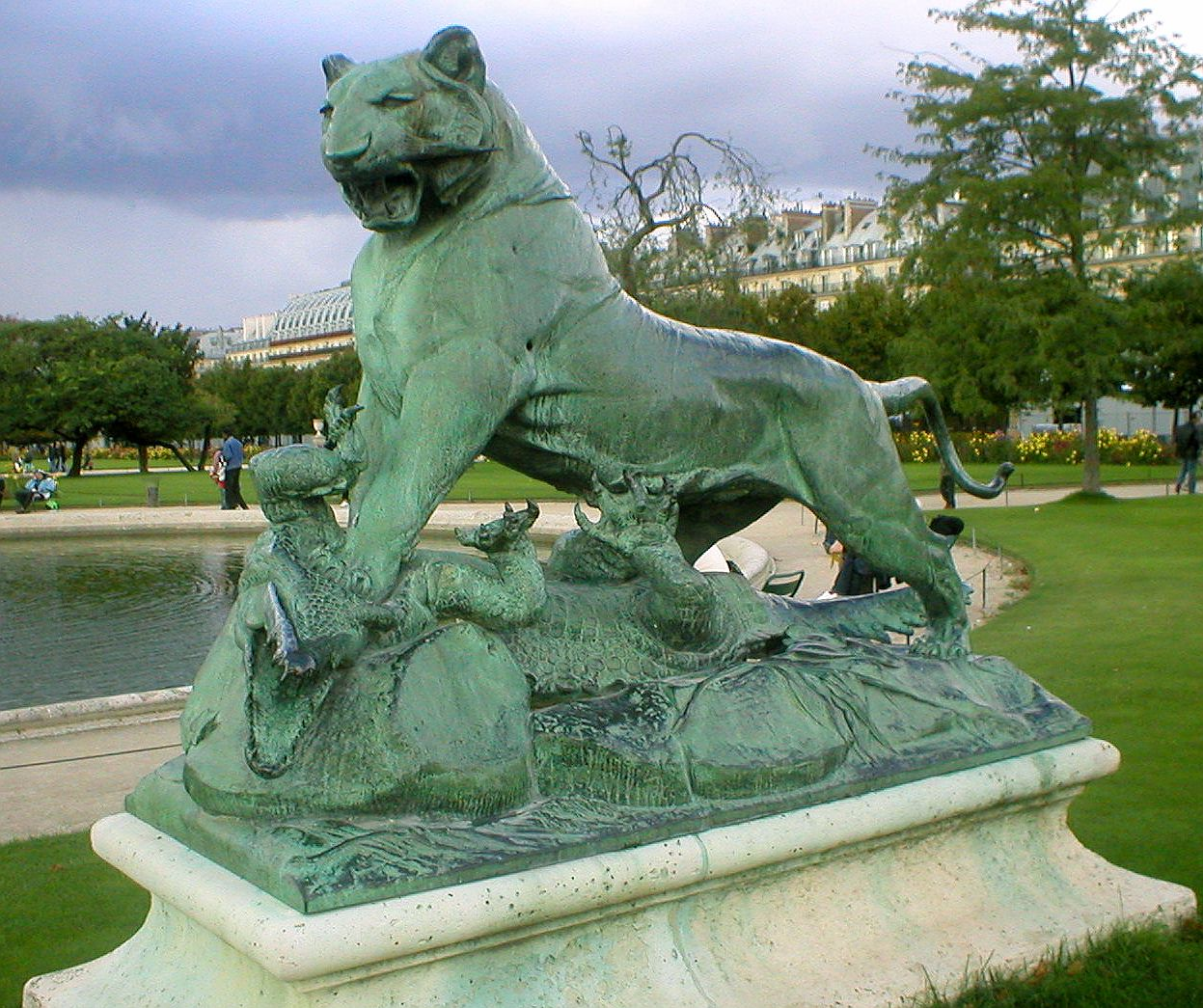
Tiger Battling a Crocodile by Auguste Caïn (1873)

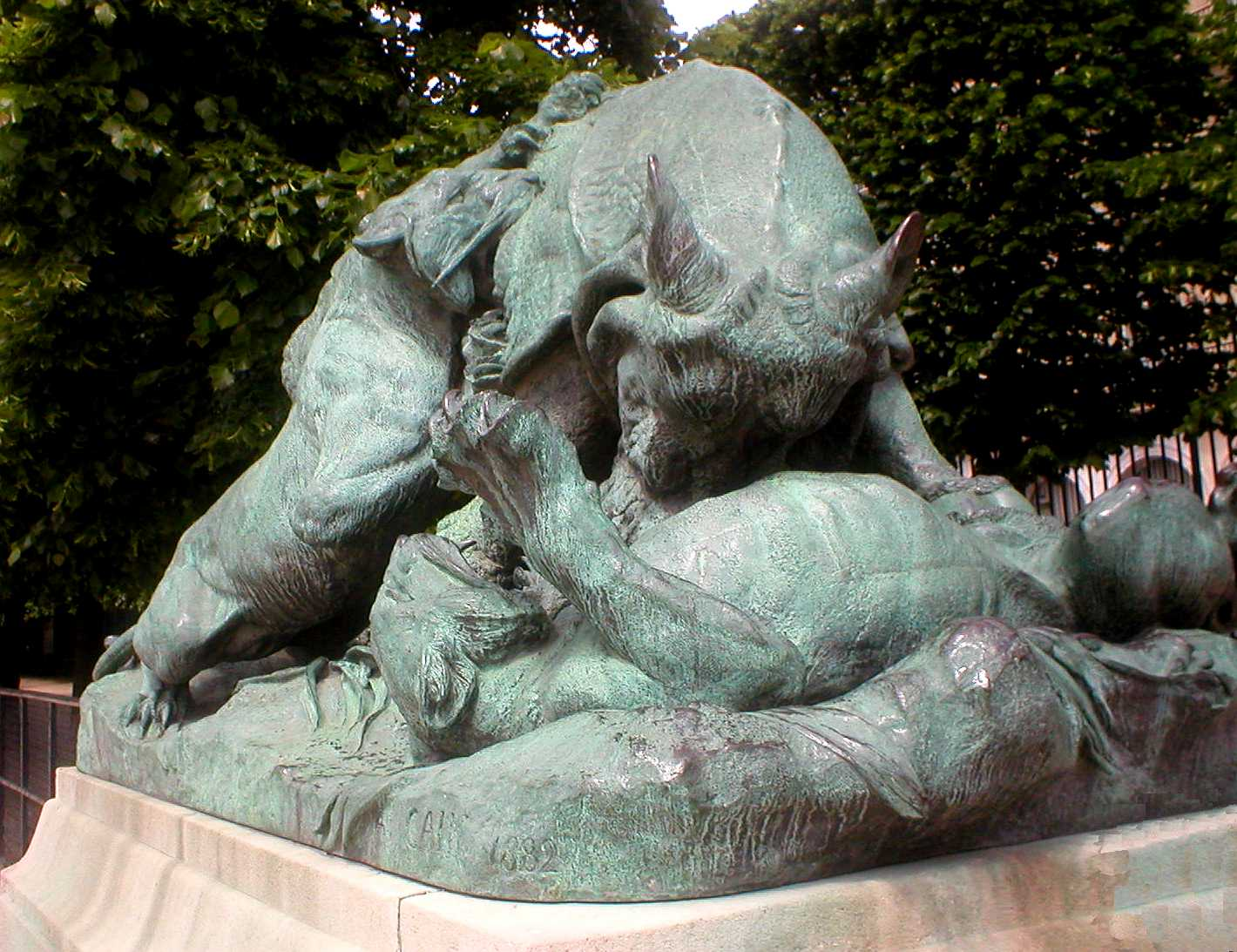
Rhinoceros Attacked by Two Tigers by Auguste Caïn. Bronze, (1882)

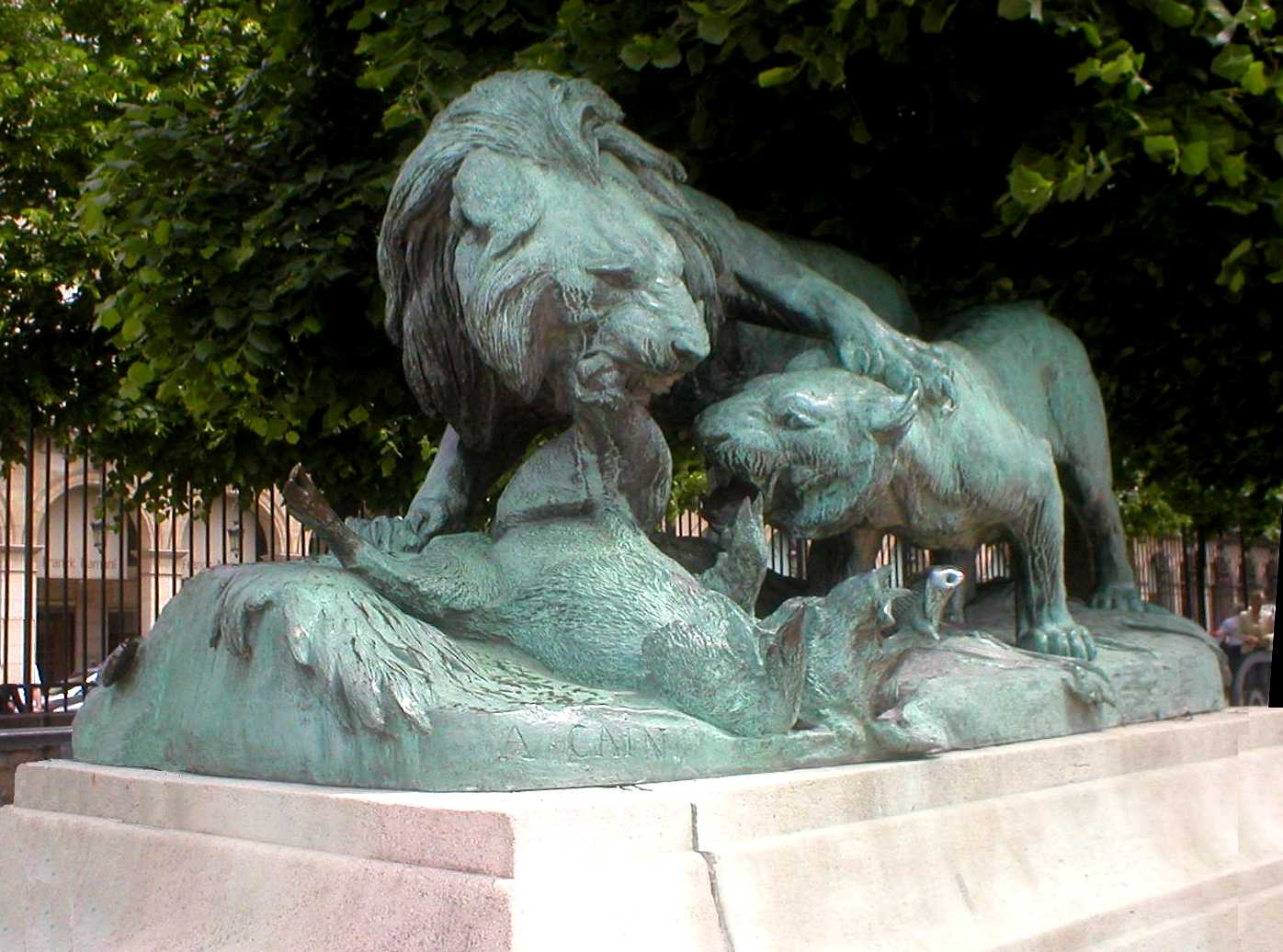
Two lions disputing a boar by Auguste Caïn. Bronze, (1882)

=== 20th century sculpture ===
In 1964 the French culture minister, Andre Malraux, introduced modern sculpture into the garden, removing a number of 19th century works and replacing them with works by Aristide Maillol.

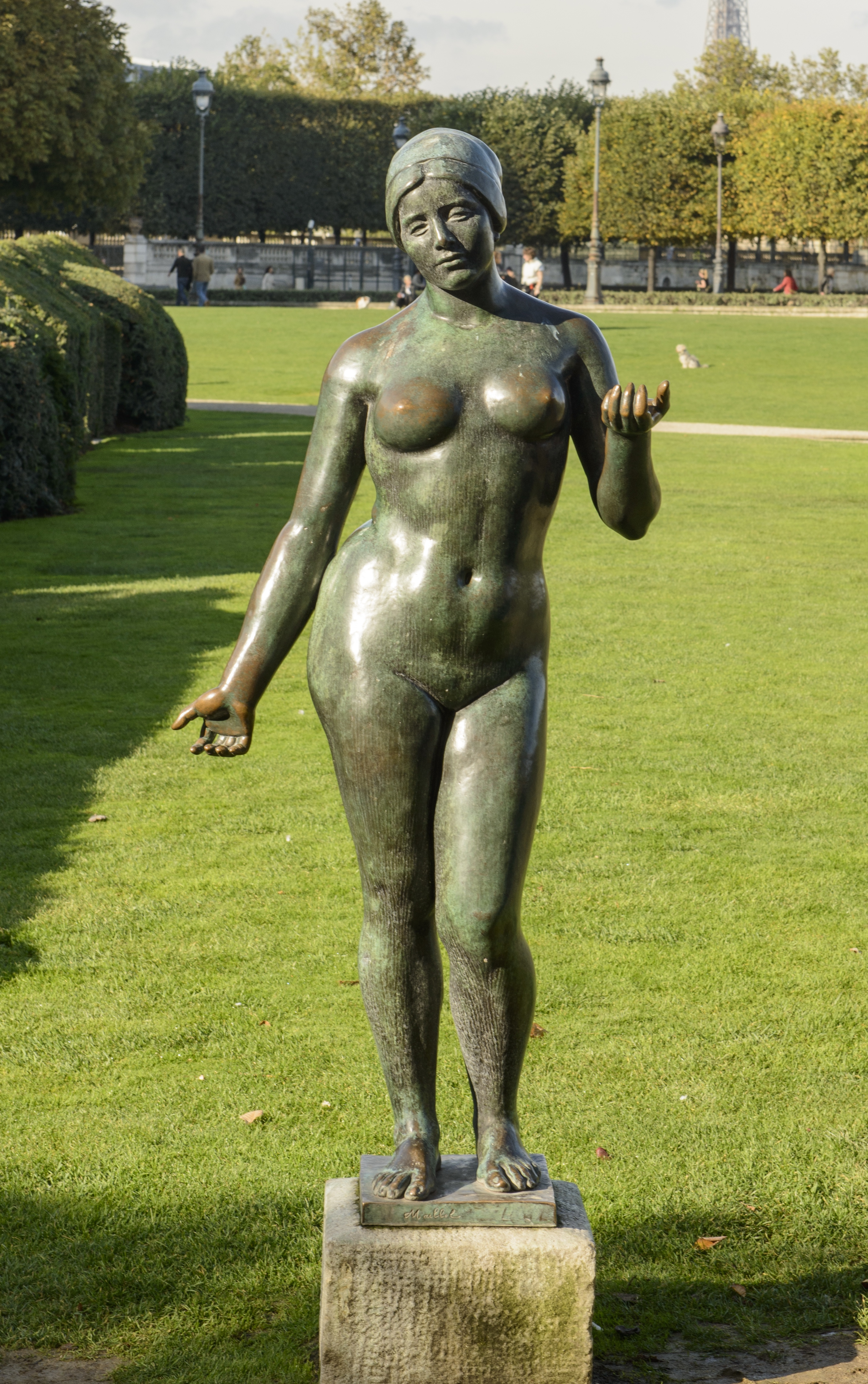
Summer by Aristide Maillol (1911)

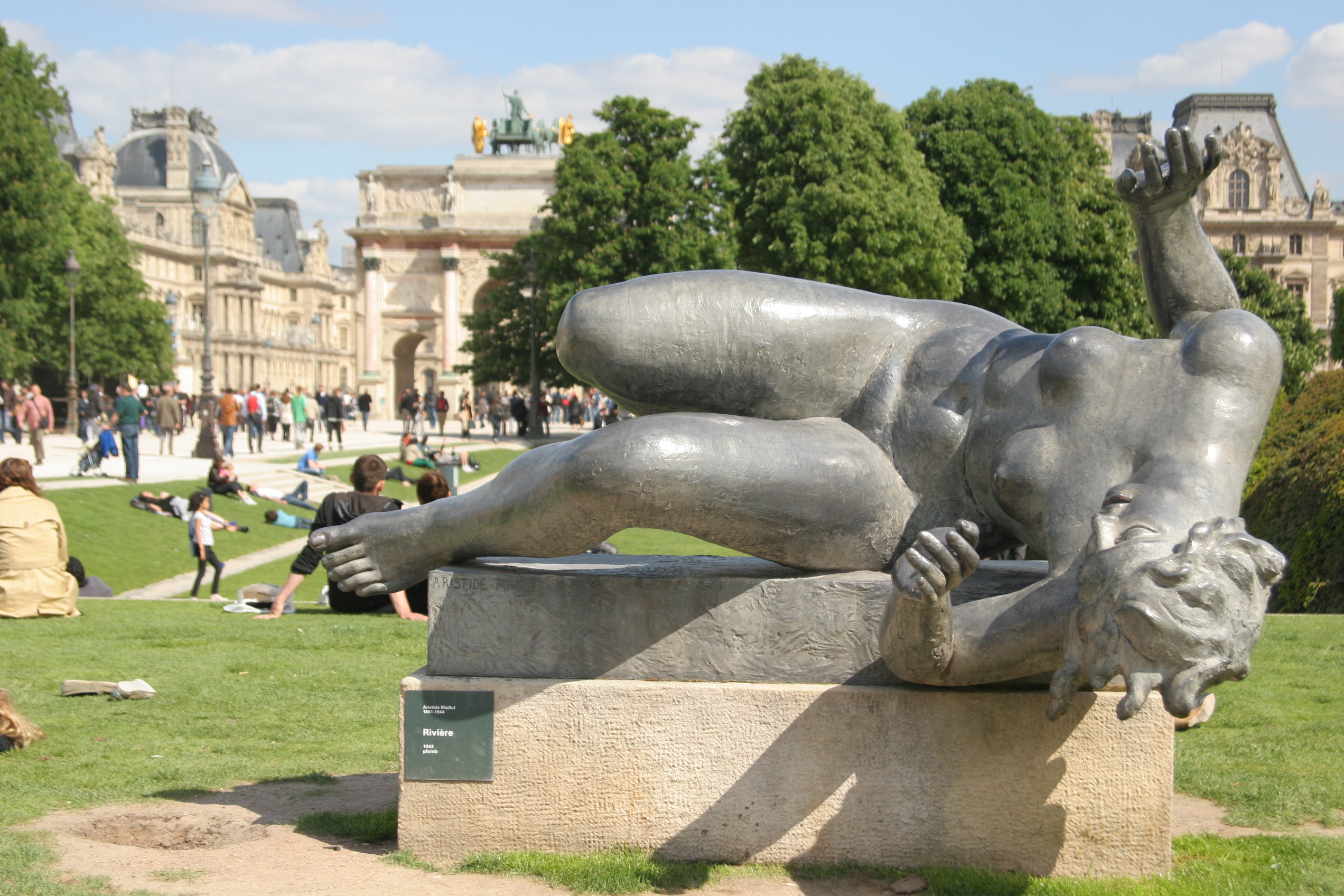
Aristide Maillol, The River, bronze, (1938–1943), Jardin du Carrousel

In the second part of the 20th century the Grand Couvert was redecorated with works of modern and contemporary sculpture by international artists, including:

- L'Échiquier, Grand, (1959) by Germaine Richier
- La Grande Musicienne, (1937) by Henri Laurens
- Personnages III (1967) by Étienne Martin
- Primo Piano II (1962) by David Smith
- Confidence (2000) by Daniel Dezeuze
- Force et Tendresse (1996) by Eugène Dodeigne
- L'Ami de personne, (1999) by Erik Dietman
- Manus Ultimus, (1997) by Magdalena Abakanowicz
- Arbre des voyelles, (2000) by Giuseppe Penone
- Brushstroke Nude (1993) by Roy Lichtenstein
- Un, deux, tros, nous (2000) by Anne Rochette
- Jeanette, (about 1933), Paul Belmondo
- Apollon, (about 1933), Paul Belmondo

== See also ==
- History of Parks and Gardens of Paris
- Tuileries Palace

== Bibliography ==
- Allain, Yves-Marie and Janine Christiany, L'art des jardins en Europe, Citadelles et Mazenod, Paris, 2006.
- Hazlehurst, F. Hamilton, Gardens of Illusion: The Genius of André Le Nostre, Vanderbilt University Press, 1980. (ISBN 9780826512093)
- Impelluso, Lucia, Jardins, potagers et labyrinthes, Hazan, Paris, 2007.
- Jacquin, Emmanuel (2000). Les Tuileries, Du Louvre à la Concorde. Paris: Editions du Patrimoine, Centres des Monuments Nationaux. ISBN 978-2-85822-296-4.
- Jarrassé, Dominique (2007). Grammaire des Jardins Parisiens. Paris: Parigramme. ISBN 978-2-84096-476-6.
- Prevot, Philippe, Histoire des jardins, Éditions Sud Ouest, 2006.
- Wenzler, Claude, Architecture du jardin, Éditions Ouest-France, 2003.
