= Birds of Knowledge of Good and Evil =

Artwork by Magdalena Abakanowicz

- Artist: Magdalena Abakanowicz
- Year: 2001
- Dimensions: (100–160 cm in × 190–260 cm in × 120–135 cm in)
- Location: East Kilbourn Ave. and North Cass St., Milwaukee; 43°2′34.398″N 87°54′6.103″W

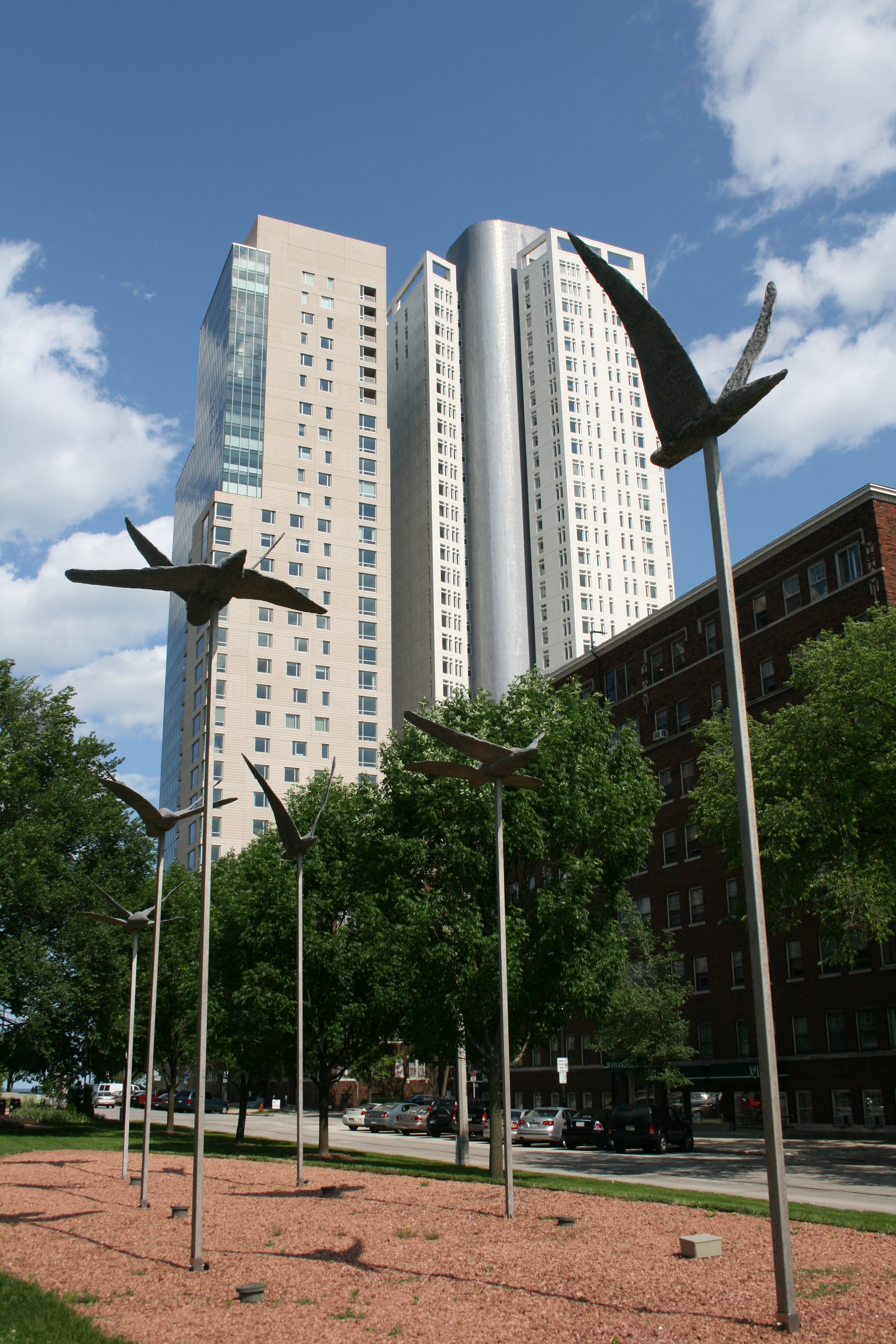

Birds of Knowledge of Good and Evil is a public artwork by Polish sculptor Magdalena Abakanowicz. It is located on the Kilbourn Avenue boulevard in Milwaukee, Wisconsin, United States. The 2001 aluminum sculpture consists six pieces organized in columns. The column heights are 4–6 meters, and the dimensions of the birds are: height 100–160 cm, width 190–260 cm, length 120–135 cm.

== Description ==
Birds of Knowledge of Good and Evil is an aluminum sculpture located near E Kilbourn Ave & N Cass St, Milwaukee, Wisconsin 53202. The sculpture faces toward Lake Michigan. It is also across from the Woman's Club of Wisconsin. It contains six separate pieces, each piece depicting a bird. Three of the birds have two wings and the other three birds have four wings. All of the bird's wings are at different angles. The six birds are arranged to mimic the ground they are set up on. Although the sculpture represents birds they are not depicted in full detail. Like many of Abakanowicz's sculptures Birds of Knowledge of Good and Evil lack heads. When asked about her work Abakanowicz states, "perhaps the experience of the crowd, waiting passively in line, but ready to trample, destroy or afore on command like a headless creature, became the core of my analysis." Along with the bird's lack of heads their surface is that of an organic texture. This is juxtaposed with their aluminum material.

There is a plaque in the lawn where the public work is located. It reads:

Magdalena Abakanowicz

Birds of Knowledge of Good and Evil.

2001.

Commissioned by members of the Woman's Club of Wisconsin on the occasion of its 125th anniversary. Celebrating Milwaukee's tradition of community service The artist wishes to acknowledge the special assistance of Artur Starewicz, Warsaw Poland

=== Location history ===
Yankee Hill is one of the oldest neighborhoods on Milwaukee's East Side. It was once a wealthy neighborhood and to this day still retains its wealth.

=== Acquisition ===
In order to honor the Woman's Club of Wisconsin on their 125th anniversary Abakanowicz was commissioned to make a public artwork for Milwaukee. The piece was meant to honor the club, as well as to pay respect to the club's members and their dedicated years of volunteer work.

== Artist ==
Quotes by Abakanowicz

"I'm frightened by crowds of people, birds or even insects swarming in great masses. People in an airport, people on a metro or on a tram, can seem threatening, horrible, a brainless entity. Today we are pushed by quantity in general. I create these crowds of figures as a warning: they're saying we are too many."

"I feel overawed by quantity where counting no longer makes sense. By unrepeatability within such a quantity. By creatures of nature gathered in herds, droves, species, in which each individual, while subservient to the mass, retains some distinguishing features. A crowd of people, birds, insects, or leaves is a mysterious assemblage of variants of certain prototype. A riddle of nature's abhorrence of exact repetition or inability to produce it. Just as the human hand cannot repeat its own gesture, I invoke this disturbing law, switching my own immobile herds into that rhythm."

== See also ==
- Agora (sculpture)
- "Female Artist Month – Magdalena Abakanowicz", Art Factory Białystok
