= Château de Costaérès =

Château in Brittany, France

- Trégastel in France
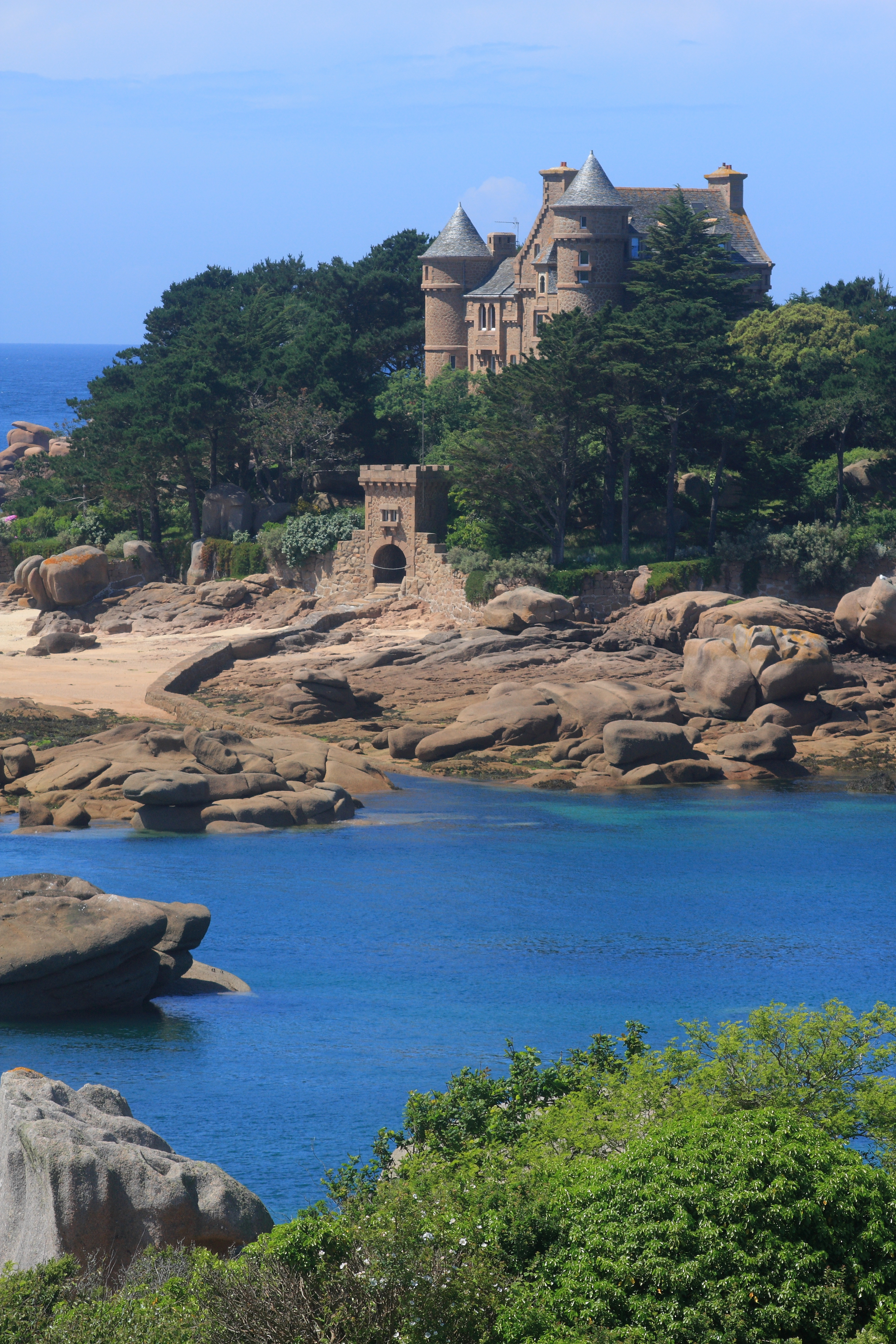

Site information
- Owner: Dieter Hallervorden

Location
- Coordinates: 48°50′07″N 3°29′33″W

Site history
- Built: 1896 for Bruno Abakanowicz

The Château de Costaérès (French pronunciation: [ʃato d(ə) kɔstaeʁɛs]) is an 1896 neo-medieval château located on the island of Costaérès in the English Channel on the territory of the French commune of Trégastel, in Côtes-d'Armor, Brittany.

== History ==
The Château de Costaérès is a large neo-medieval manor characteristic of the great summer houses of the late 19th century on Brittany's Côte de Granit Rose (Pink Granite Coast).

The building, a voluminous complex resulting from several extensions, is made of pink granite from the quarries of La Clarté, Perros-Guirec district. The roof is slate.

Its interior was designed with reclaimed wood from a three-masted sailing ship beached in the winter of 1896, the Maurice.

The manor was built on an islet bought at the end of the summer of 1892 by Bruno Abakanowicz (also called Bruno Abdank, who a little later – around 1896 – built the Bellevue hotel in Ploumanac'h), engineer and mathematician of Polish origin, from the customs officer René Le Brozec, a Perrosian who cultivated potatoes there and dried lichen and fish. The going rate at the time was 0.25 F per square metre. It was completed around 1896 by the engineer Lanmoniez and the Lannionnais entrepreneur Pierre Le Tensorer.

After 1900, the date of Bruno's death, his daughter, Sofia Abakanowicz, who had become Madame Poray, had the manor extended by a wing to the west in return on the rear facade.

During the Second World War, the manor was requisitioned by the German army, and suffered some interior damage.

Following roofing work, on 6 September 1990 a fire partially destroyed the interior of the building.

Images of this château on its islet are often used to illustrate postcards and tourist guides of the fr:Côte de granit rose, Côtes-d'Armor and Brittany.

== Geography ==
This castle took the name of the one-hectare islet on which it was built: Costaérès comes from coz-seherez (kozh-sec'herezh in modern Breton) which in Breton means "old drier". It was there, in fact, that fishermen used to dry their fish in the sun.

The islet is located in the commune of Trégastel, facing the beaches of Tourony and Saint-Guirec (Ploumanac'h), and separated from the latter by the channel of the port of Ploumanac'h formed by the Grand-Traouïero stream. It is accessible at low tide from Tourony beach.

The islet is part of the Natura 2000 protected zone Côte de granit rose-Sept-Îles

== Personalities ==
Several personalities have stayed or lived in Costaérès:

- Bruno Abakanowicz, mathematician, engineer, commissioner of the work.
- fr:Ladislas Mickiewicz, writer, eldest son of Polish poet Adam Mickiewicz.
- Henryk Sienkiewicz who stayed there in 1898–1899, and while there wrote his novel Quo vadis ? which earned him the 1905 Nobel Prize for Literature. A beach in Trégastel bears the name of Quo vadis.
- Léo Ferré, poet, musician.
- Dieter Hallervorden, German comedian, is the current owner of the château.

== Gallery ==
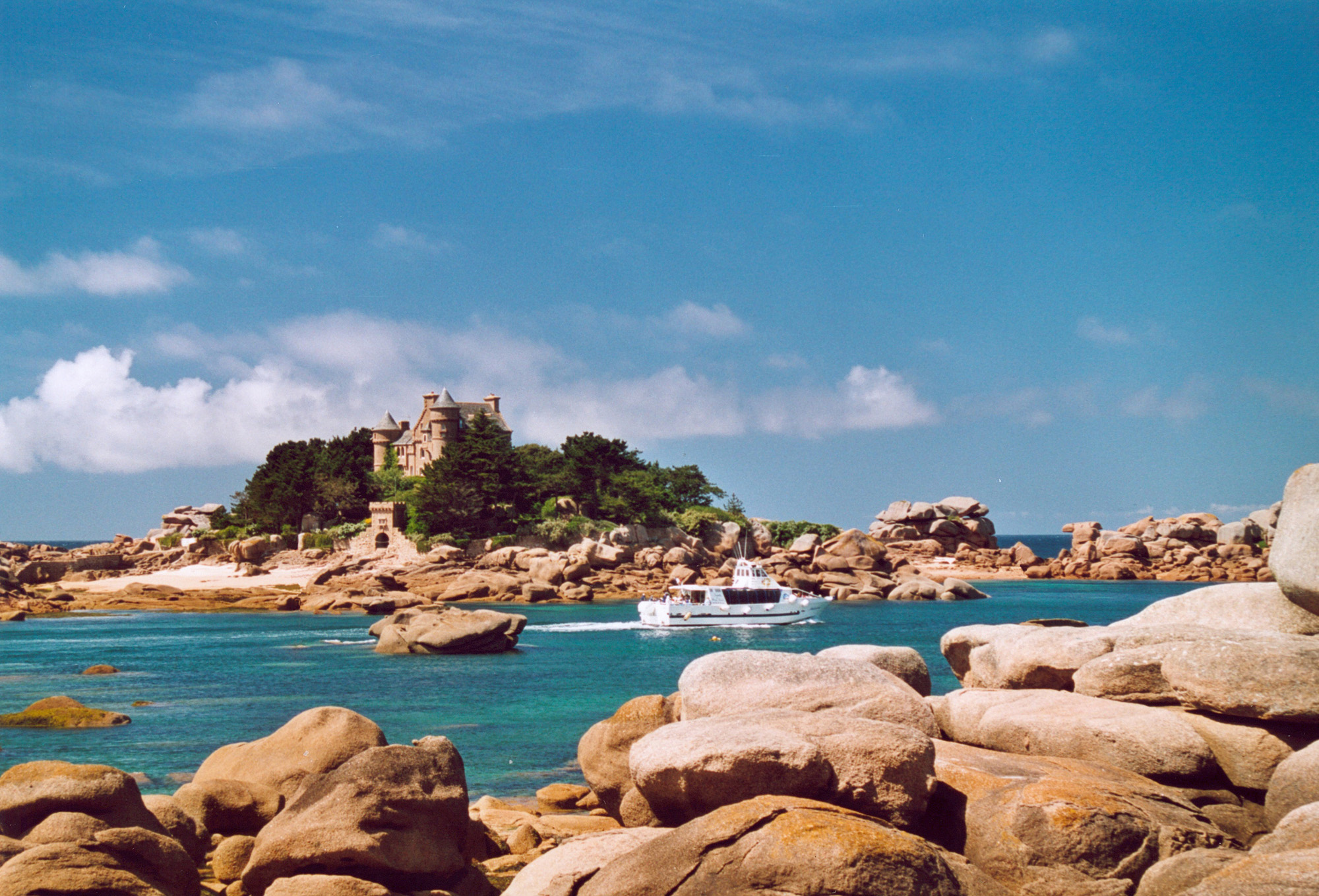
The pink granite coast.

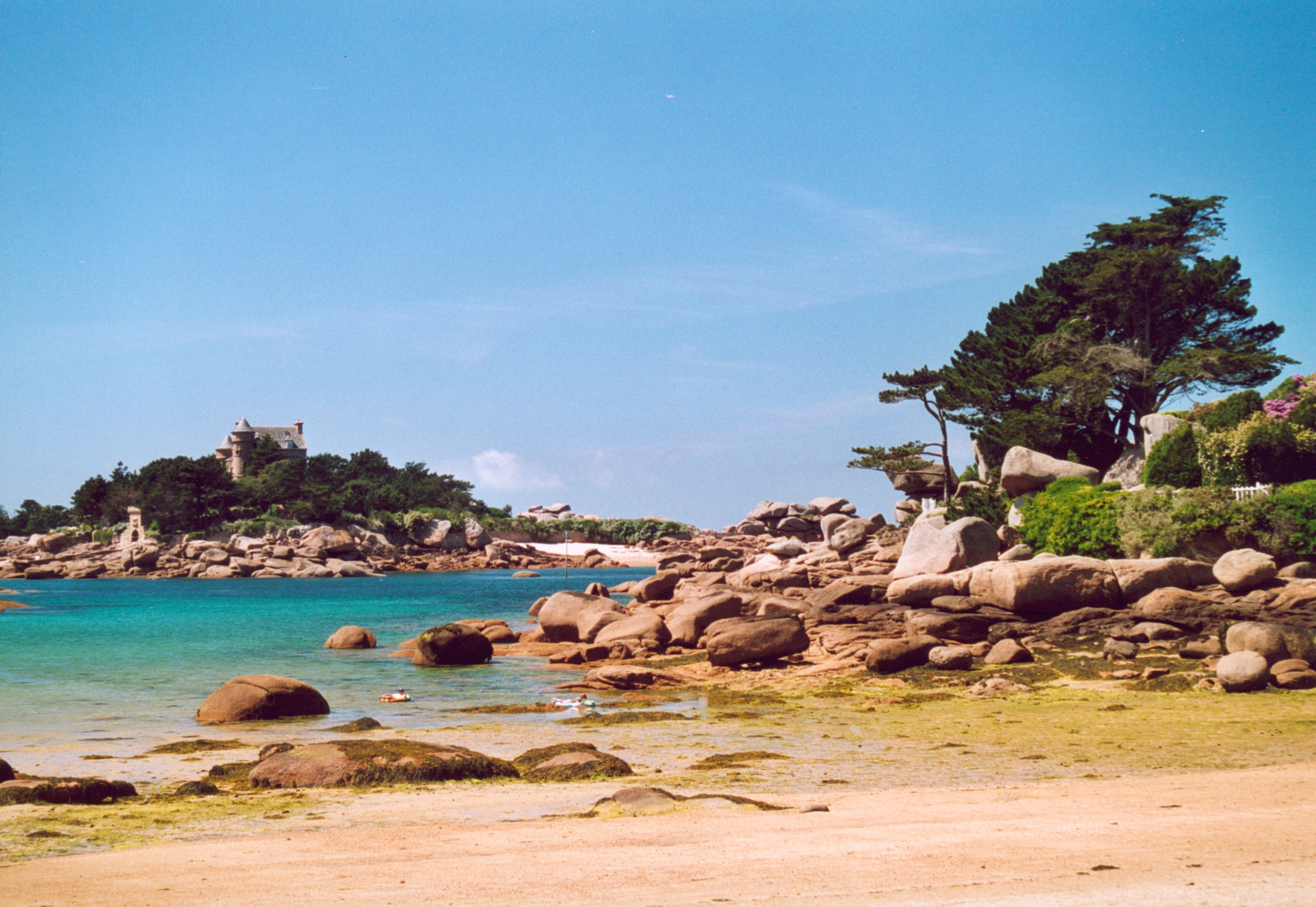

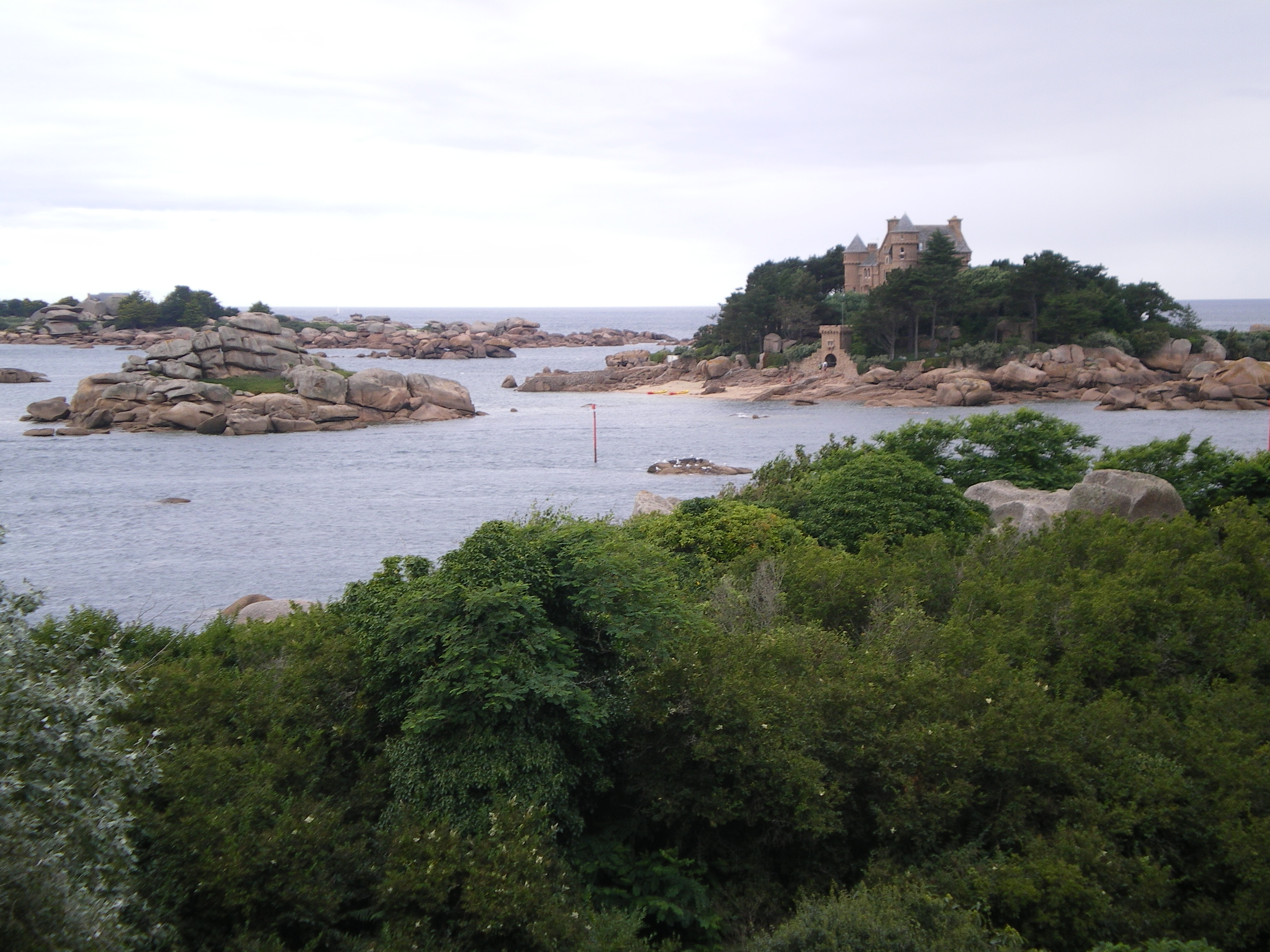
The château.

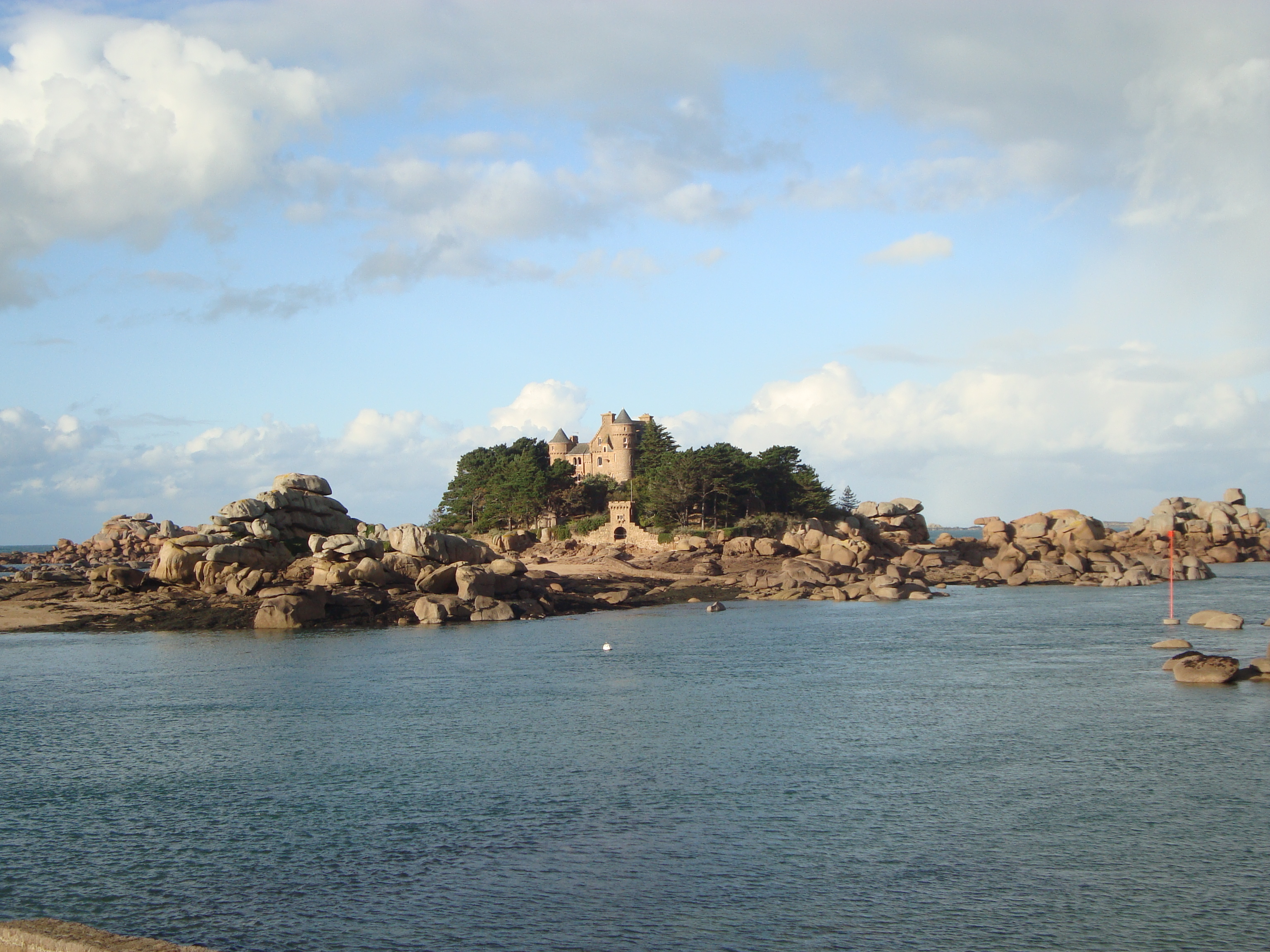

== See also ==
- Trégastel
- fr:Anse Saint-Guirec
- fr:Liste des châteaux des Côtes-d'Armor
