= Bruno Abakanowicz =

Polish mathematician, inventor, and electrical engineer

Bruno Abdank-Abakanowicz
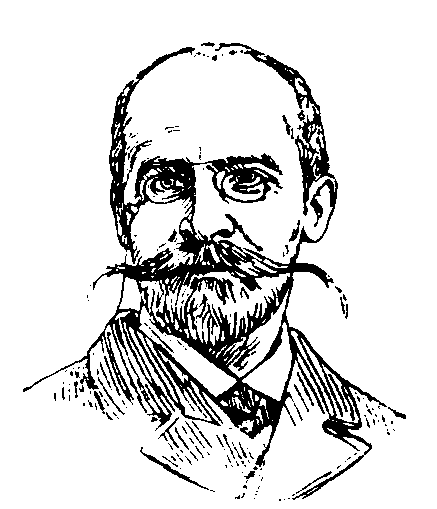
- Born: 6 October 1852; Ukmergė, Russian Empire
- Died: 29 August 1900 (aged 47); Saint-Maur-des-Fossés, France
- Occupations: Mathematician, inventor, and electrical engineer

Bruno Abdank-Abakanowicz (6 October 1852 – 29 August 1900) was a Polish mathematician, inventor, and electrical engineer. He is best known for inventing the integraph and contributing to the development of mathematical instruments and early electrification systems in France.

== Life ==
Abakanowicz was born in 1852 in Ukmergė, then part of the Vilna Governorate of the Russian Empire (now Lithuania).

After graduating from the Riga Technical University, he completed his habilitation and began working as an assistant at the Technical University of Lwów. In 1881, he moved to France, where he purchased a villa in Parc Saint-Maur on the outskirts of Paris.

Earlier, Abakanowicz invented the integraph, a mechanical device for drawing the integral of a curve, which was patented in 1880. It was later produced commercially by the Swiss firm Coradi. Among his other inventions were the parabolagraph, the spirograph, an electric bell used in trains, and a form of electric arc lamp.

He also published several works on statistics, mathematical instruments, and practical applications of integration, including Les intégraphes (1886). In France, he served as a government expert on electrification projects and worked on systems in cities such as Lyon. His patents and innovations brought him wealth and recognition, and in 1889 he was awarded the Légion d'honneur.

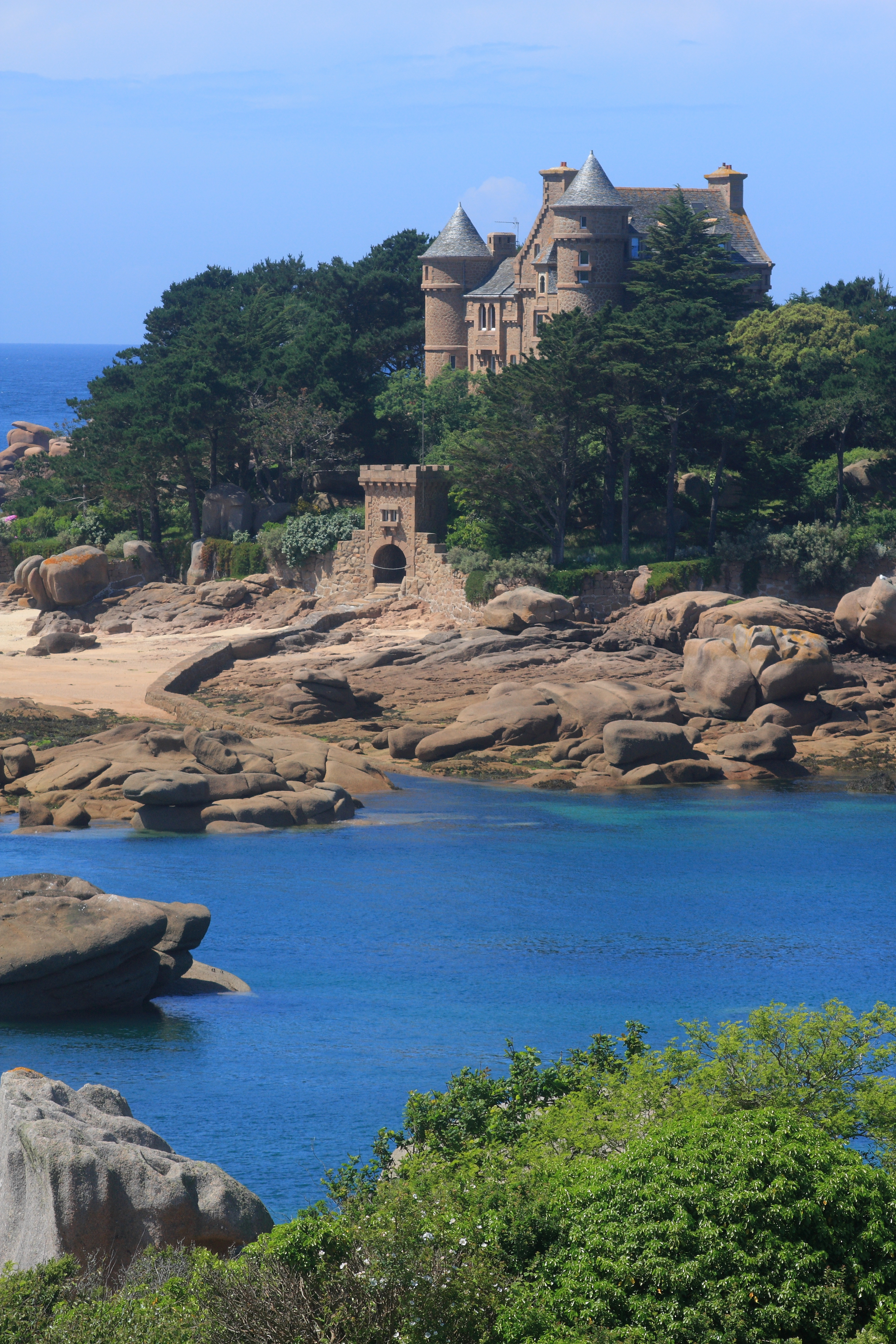
The Château de Costaérès built by Abakanowicz in Trégastel

In the 1890s, Abakanowicz retired to a small island in Trégastel, Brittany, where between 1892 and 1896 he built the Château de Costaérès, a neo-Gothic manor. Although the construction was not completed during his lifetime, the castle became a meeting place for the Polish émigré community in France. Frequent guests included Aleksander Gierymski, Władysław Mickiewicz, Leon Wyczółkowski, and Henryk Sienkiewicz. Sienkiewicz completed The Teutonic Knights and The Polaniecki Family at Abakanowicz's villa in Saint-Maur and wrote Quo Vadis at the Château de Costaérès.

Abakanowicz died suddenly on 29 August 1900. In his will, he appointed Sienkiewicz as the guardian of his only daughter, Zofia, who later graduated from the London School of Economics and the Sorbonne, and was murdered during World War II at the Auschwitz concentration camp.

== Legacy and identity ==
Abakanowicz’s nationality has been described in different ways. He was born in the territory of the former Polish–Lithuanian Commonwealth, which by 1852 was part of the Russian Empire. Some contemporary documents list him as Russian due to political boundaries, while Encyclopædia Britannica refers to him as Lithuanian. However, his education, language, and social circle were predominantly Polish, and he is generally regarded as a Polish scientist and inventor.

The surname Abakanowicz, of Lipka Tatar origin, derives from a noble family of the szlachta associated with the Abdank coat of arms.

== Works ==
- Les intégraphes. La courbe intégrale et ses applications, Paris, Gauthier-Villars, 1886. Translated into German as Die Integraphen. Die Integralkurve und ihre Anwendungen, Leipzig, Teubner, 1889.

== See also ==
- List of multiple discoveries
- List of Poles
- List of Russian inventors
- Timeline of Polish science and technology
- For other notable members of his family, see Abakanowicz

== Sources ==
- "Bruno Abdank-Abakanowicz" Polish Contributions to Computing
