= Abakanowicz =

Abakanowicz is a surname originating from the szlachta of the Polish–Lithuanian Commonwealth under the Abdank coat of arms in Polish heraldry.

== History ==
The Abakanowicz family is of Tatar descent. A branch of the Krzeczowski clan, they possessed the rights and privileges due nobility in the Polish–Lithuanian Commonwealth.

The founder of the family was Abul Abbas Fursowicz Krzeczowski, the co-owner of Krzeczowice, who is mentioned in 1565 and 1569. His sons were Józef, Suleiman, Eliasz and Ahmet Abbas-Kanowicze, who are mentioned in a royal document from 1631. Ahmet's son was Janusz known as Abakanowicz, whereas Janusz's son was Jerzy. It is assumed, that Jerzy (Jur) converted to Catholicism, because documents indicate that from the time of Jerzy Jurewicz Abakanowicz, the lord of Podruksze-Lachowszczyzna rodzina the family is documented as professing Roman Catholicism.

Jerzy and Adam Abakanowicz signed the 1763 manifest of the Szlachta of Vilnius Voivodeship.

In the rolls of nobility in the Kovno Governorate in the years 1849 and 1860 Michał, Ignacy and Jan, the sons of Kazimierz, and the grandchildren of Jerzy, lord of Podruksze-Lachowszczyzna are listed.

It was borne by at least three notable personalities:

- Bruno Abakanowicz (1852–1900), Polish mathematician and inventor
- Lt.Col. Piotr Abakanowicz (Barski; 1890–1948), an officer of the Polish Army
- Magdalena Abakanowicz (1930–2017), an artist
