= Magdalena Abakanowicz =

Polish sculptor (1930–2017)

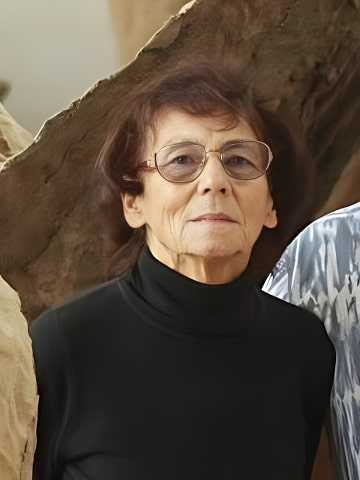
- Abakanowicz in her studio, 2010
- Born: Marta Magdalena Abakanowicz; 20 June 1930; Falenty, Poland
- Died: 20 April 2017 (aged 86); Warsaw, Poland
- Education: Warsaw Academy of Fine Arts
- Known for: Sculpture; fiber art
- Notable work: Agora (2006); Birds of Knowledge of Good and Evil (2001)
- Movement: Postminimalism
- Awards: Herder Prize (1979); Leonardo da Vinci World Award of Arts (1999)

Magdalena Abakanowicz (Polish pronunciation: [maɡdaˈlɛna abakaˈnɔvit͡ʂ] aba-ka-NO-vich; 20 June 1930 – 20 April 2017) was a Polish sculptor and fiber artist. Known for her use of textiles as a sculptural medium and for outdoor installations, Abakanowicz has been considered among the most influential Polish artists of the postwar era. She worked as a professor of studio art at the University of Fine Arts in Poznań, Poland, from 1965 to 1990, and as a visiting professor at University of California, Los Angeles in 1984.

She was born to a noble landowning family in Falenty, near Warsaw, before the outbreak of World War II. Her formative years were marred by the Nazi occupation of Poland, during which her family became part of the Polish resistance. After the war, under the imposed communist rule, Abakanowicz attended the Academy of Fine Arts in Sopot and the Academy of Fine Arts in Warsaw between 1950 and 1954, navigating a conservative educational environment marked by the imposition of Soviet-dictated restrictive and propagandistic doctrine of Socialist Realism.

The Polish October and subsequent political and cultural thaw in 1956 marked a significant turning point in Abakanowicz's career. In the late 1950s and early 1960s, Abakanowicz's work began to take on more structure and geometric form, influenced in part by Constructivism. Her one-person exhibit at the Kordegarda Gallery in Warsaw in 1960 signaled her emergence in the Polish textile and fiber design movement. She received first international recognition following her participation in the first Biennale Internationale de le Tapisserie in Lausanne, Switzerland, in 1962.

Abakanowicz's most celebrated works emerged in the 1960s with her creation of three-dimensional fiber works called Abakans. During the 1970s and 1980s, she transitioned to creating humanoid sculptures. These works reflected the anonymity and confusion of the individual amidst the human mass, a theme influenced by her life under a Communist regime. Some of her prominent international public artworks include Agora in Chicago and Birds of Knowledge of Good and Evil in Milwaukee.

== Early life ==
Marta Magdalena Abakanowicz (married name Kosmowska) was born to a noble landowning family in the village of Falenty, near Warsaw. Her mother, Helena Domaszewska, descended from old Polish nobility. Her father, Konstanty Abakanowicz, came from a Polonized Lipka Tatar family that traced its origins to Abaqa Khan, a 13th-century Mongol chieftain. Her father's family fled Russia to the newly re-established democratic Poland in the aftermath of the October Revolution.

When she was nine, Nazi Germany invaded and occupied Poland. Her family endured the war years living on the outskirts of Warsaw and became part of the Polish resistance. At the age of 14 she became a nurse's aid in a Warsaw hospital; seeing the impact of war first hand would later influence her art. After the war, the family moved to the small city of Tczew near Gdańsk, in northern Poland, where they hoped to start a new life.

Under the newly-imposed communist doctrine, the Polish government officially adopted socialist realism as the only acceptable art form which should be pursued by artists; it had to be 'national in form' and 'socialist in content'. Other art forms being practiced at the time in the Western Bloc, such as Modernism, were officially outlawed and heavily censored in all Communist Bloc nations, including Poland. Lack of official approval did nothing to reduce her enthusiasm or alter the revolutionary course of her work.

== Education ==
Abakanowicz completed part of her high school education in Tczew from 1945 to 1947, after which she went to Gdynia for two additional years of art school at the Liceum Sztuk Plastycznych in that city. After her graduation from the Liceum in 1949, Abakanowicz attended the Academy of Fine Arts in Sopot (now in Gdańsk). In 1950, Abakanowicz moved back to Warsaw to begin her studies at the Academy of Fine Arts there, the leading art school in Poland. To get into the Academy she had to pretend to be the daughter of a clerk, because her noble background would otherwise have prevented her acceptance on the course.

Her years at the university, 1950–1954, coincided with some of the harshest assaults made on art by the leaders of the Eastern Bloc. By utilizing the doctrine of 'Socialist realism', all art forms in communist nations were forced to adhere to strict guidelines and limitations that subordinated the arts to the needs and demands of the State. Realist artistic depictions based on the national 19th-century academic tradition were the only form of artistic expression taught in Poland at the time. The Warsaw Academy of Fine Arts, being the most important artistic institution in Poland, came under special scrutiny from the Ministry of Art and Culture, which administered all major decisions in the field at the time.

Abakanowicz found the climate at the Academy to be highly "rigid" and overly "conservative". She recalled:

I liked to draw, seeking the form by placing lines, one next to the other. The professor would come with an eraser in his hand and rub out every unnecessary line on my drawing, leaving a thin, dry contour. I hated him for it.

While studying at the university she was required to take several textile design classes, learning the art of weaving, screen printing, and fiber design from instructors such as Anna Sledziewska, Eleonora Plutyńska, and Maria Urbanowicz. These instructors and skills would greatly influence Abakanowicz's work, as well as that of other prominent Polish artists of the time.

== First artworks ==
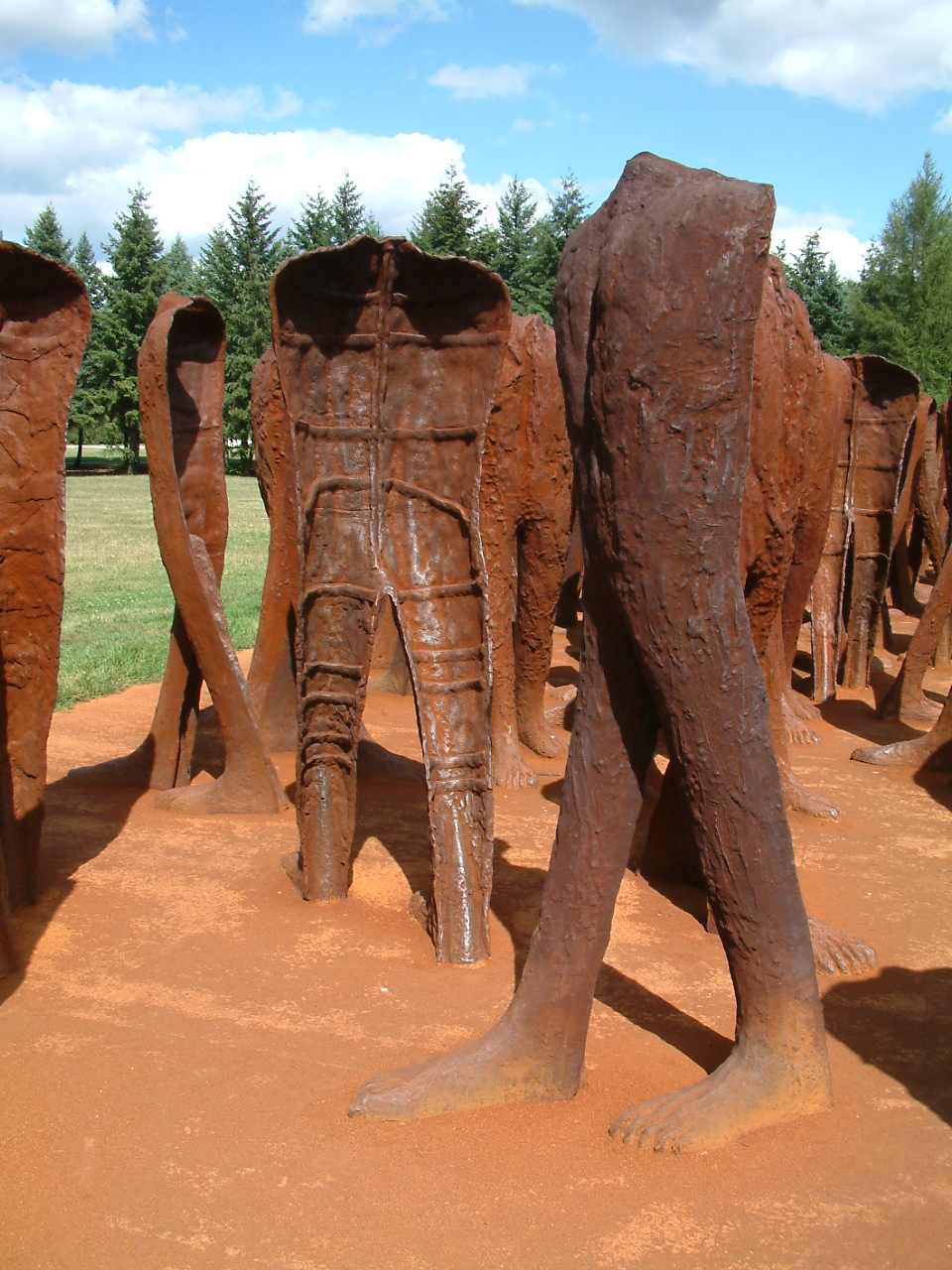
Nierozpoznani ("The Unrecognised Ones", 2002) at the Cytadela Park in Poznań, Poland (whole installation)

Following her education at the Academy, Abakanowicz began to produce her first artistic works. Due to the fact that she spent most of her academic life moving from place to place, much of her earlier artwork was lost or damaged, with only a few, delicate plant drawings surviving. Between 1956 and 1959, she produced some of her earliest known works; a series of large gouaches and watercolors on paper and sewn-together linen sheets. These works, described as being 'biomorphic" in composition, depicted imaginary plants, birds, exotic fish, and seashells, among other biomorphic shapes and forms. Joanna Inglot wrote in The Figurative Sculpture of Magdalena Abakanowicz about these early works: "[they] pointed to Abakanowicz's early fascination with the natural world and its processes of germination, growth, blooming, and sprouting. They seem to capture the very energy of life, a quality that would become a constant feature of her art." Abakanowicz said:

My gouaches were as large as the wall permitted. Depressed by years of study, I was fighting back by making my gouaches for myself. For so long it had been repeated that I could not do it; my response had to be on a big scale. I wanted to take a walk among imaginary plants.

It was also during this time that the Polish People's Republic began to lift some of the heavy political pressures imposed by the Soviet Union, mainly due to the death of Joseph Stalin in 1953. In 1956, under the new party leadership of Władysław Gomułka, Poland experienced a dramatic social and cultural shift during the Polish October. The shift resulted in the liberalization of the forms and content of art, with Stalinist methods of art form being openly criticized by Gomułka's government.

A major freedom granted to Polish artists was the permission to travel to several Western cities, such as Paris, Venice, Munich, and New York City, to experience artistic developments outside the communist countries. This liberalization of the arts in Poland and injection of other art forms into the Polish art world greatly influenced Abakanowicz's early works, as she began to consider much of her early work as being too flamboyant and lacking in structure. Constructivism began to influence her work in the late 1950s as she adopted a more geometric and structured approach. Never fully accepting Constructivism, she searched for her own "artistic language and for a way to make her art more tactile, intuitive, and personal." As a result, she soon adopted weaving as another avenue of artistic exploration.

In her first one-person exhibit at the Kordegarda Gallery in Warsaw in the spring of 1960, she included a series of four weavings along with a collection of gouaches and watercolors. Though her first exhibit received minimal critical notice, it helped advance her position within the Polish textile and fiber design movement and resulted in her inclusion into the first Biennale Internationale de le Tapisserie in Lausanne, Switzerland, in 1962. The event opened the way to her international success.

Over the next few years, she challenged the established idea that weaving could not be fine art, by using metal supports and pulling the pieces away from the walls thus making woven but increasingly sculptural work.

== Series ==
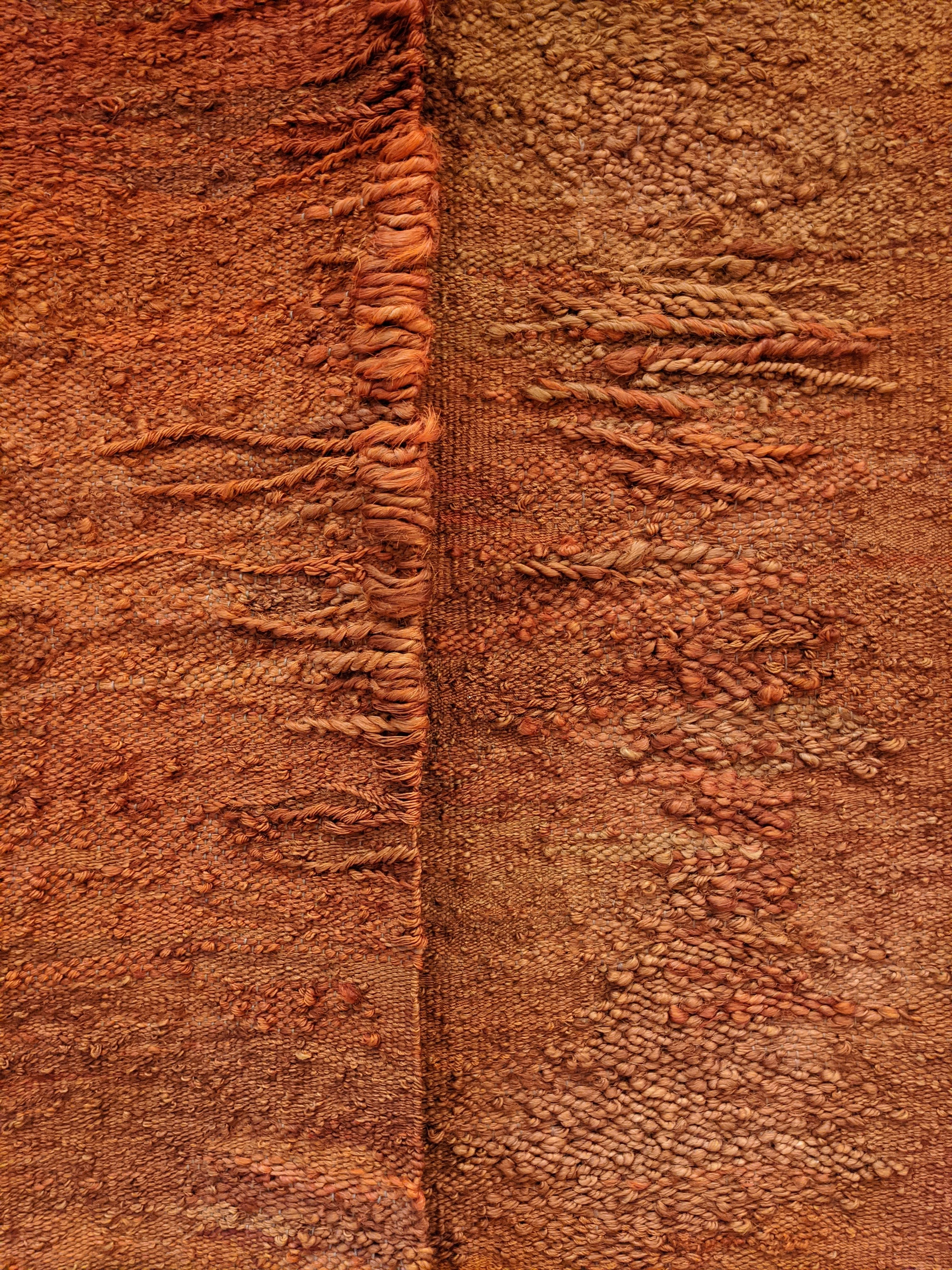
Nasher Sculpture Center, Untitled, 1980–1983. This image is a detail of Untitled, one of the largest sisal weavings Abakanowicz ever made.

=== Abakans ===
The 1960s saw some of the most important works produced during Abakanowicz's career. In 1967, she began producing three-dimensional fiber works called Abakans. Her Abakans were included in a group exhibition titled, Wall Hangings, organised in 1969 at the Museum of Modern Art in New York by Mildred Constantine, curator of architecture and design, and the textile designer Jack Lenor Larsen. Abakanowicz and the other artists included in the exhibition were pushing boundaries between high art and traditional definitions of what was considered craft. Her use of "unexpected, often soft materials, arranged in modular or serial structures” in her Abakan series, places her within the Postminimalism art movement that began in 1966. Abakanowicz stated that she sought the “total obliteration of the utilitarian function of tapestry” and demonstrated the capacity of fiber to produce forms that were soft yet structured and complex.

Each Abakan is made out of woven material using Abakanowicz's own technique. The material used for many of these pieces was found, often collecting sisal ropes from harbors, intertwining them into threads and dying them. She also used "rope, hemp, flax, wool and horsehair." Hung from the ceiling, Abakans reach sizes as large as thirteen feet with sometimes only a few inch clearance from the ground. The Abakans often incorporated reproductive references to eggs and the womb.

One of her large Abakans is included in the collection of the Nasher Sculpture Center in Dallas, Texas. The piece hangs on the wall and is made of five large recycled sisal panels in varying thickness and dyed in a burnt umber color. The work was acquired in 2019 and was exhibited in an exhibition titled Resist/Release.

In October 2023, Abakanowicz's pioneering textile art served as inspiration for the latest collection from the Alexander McQueen fashion house, which debuted at the Paris Fashion Week. The designs were created by Sarah Burton and were met with high acclaim as they were presented alongside two Abakans from the collection of the Central Textile Museum in Łódź.

=== Humanoid sculptures ===
During the 1970s, and into the 1980s, Abakanowicz changed medium and scale; she began a series of figurative and non-figurative sculptures made out of pieces of coarse sackcloth which she sewed and pieced together and bonded with synthetic resins. These works became more representational than previous sculptures but still retain a degree of abstraction and ambiguity. In 1974-1975 she produced sculptures called Alterations, which were twelve hollowed-out headless human figures sitting in a row. From 1973–1975 she produced a series of enormous, solid forms reminiscent of human heads without faces called Heads. From 1976-1980 she produced a piece call Backs, which was a series of eighty slightly differing sculptures of the human trunk.

In 1986-87 she created a series of fifty standing figures called Crowd I. She also began to once again work around organic structures, such as her Embryology series, which consisted of several dozen soft egg-like lumps varying in size. These were dispersed round an exhibition room at the Vienna Biennial in 1980.

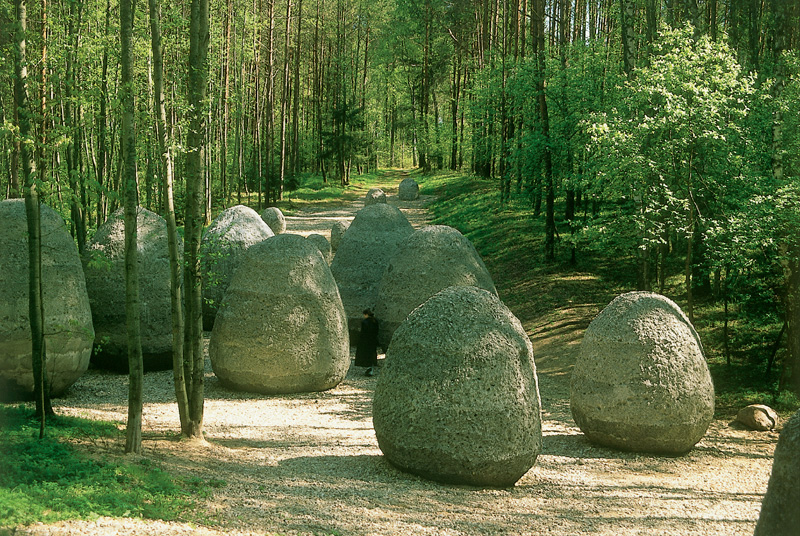
Space of Unknown Growth (1997–1998) at the Europos Parkas, Lithuania

These humanoid works of the 1970s and 1980s were centered around human culture and nature as a whole and its condition and position in modern society. The multiplicity of the human forms represents confusion and anonymity, analyzing an individual's presence in a mass of humanity. These works have close connections to Abakanowicz's life living in a Communist regime which repressed individual creativity and intellect in favor of the collective interest. These works also contrast with her earlier Abakan series, which were individually powerful pieces, whereas the figurative sculptures lost their individuality in favor of multiplicity.

In the late 1980s to 1990s Abakanowicz began to use metals, such as bronze, for her sculptures, as well as wood, stone, and clay. Her works from this period include Bronze Crowd (1990–91), shown in the garden of the Nasher Sculpture Center, and Puellae (1992), part of the National Gallery of Art's collection. She stated in a speech given at the Academy of Fine Arts in Łódź:

In consequence, the expression of art saturated with history, deformed by modernity, diverging from the direction of art in the free world. Perhaps the experience of the crowd, waiting passively in line, but ready to trample, destroy or adore on command like a headless creature, became the core of my analysis. And maybe it was a fascination with the scale of the human body. Or a desire to determine the minimal amount necessary to express the whole.

From September 27, 2014, to September 27, 2015, the National Museum of Women in the Arts displayed Abakanowicz’s large scale bronze sculptures of humans and birds in its New York Avenue Sculpture Project.

In 2019, her work featuring humanoid sculptures entitled Caminando, from the private collection of Robin Williams, set a new record at auction for an artwork sold in Poland by fetching 8 million zlotys (ca. US$2.1 million). This record was broken again twice in 2021 when in October another of her works known as Crowd III (1989) fetched 13.2 million zlotys (ca. $3.3 million) while in December her Bambini (1999) set of sculptures was sold for 13.6 million zloty.

=== War Games ===
One of Abakanowicz's most unusual works is titled War Games, which is a cycle of monumental structures made up of huge trunks of old trees, with their branches and bark removed. Partly bandaged with rags and hugged by steel hoops, these sculptures are placed on lattice metal stands. Like the name of the cycle implies, these sculptures have a very militaristic feel to them, as they have been compared to artillery vehicles. During the 1990s Abakanowicz was also commissioned to design a model of an ecologically-oriented city. She also choreographed dance.

=== Agora ===
Abakanowicz's final round of work includes a project called Agora, which is a permanent installation located at the southern end of Chicago's Grant Park, not far from the Roosevelt Road Metra station. It consists of 106 cast iron figures, each about nine feet tall. All the figures are similar in shape, but different in details. The artist and her three assistants created models for each figure by hand, and the casting took place from 2004 to 2006. The surface of each figure resembles a tree bark or wrinkled skin. The work creates a feeling of crowdedness, hence the name "agora". Furthermore, all the bodies are headless and armless giving them an eerie, anonymous look.

Agora by Magdalena Abakanowicz, in the south end of Grant Park, Chicago, Illinois, at the intersection of Michigan Avenue and East Roosevelt Road. The entire installation is about 300 feet (91 m) long.

== Collections ==
- Hirshhorn Museum and Sculpture Garden, Smithsonian Institution
- Frederik Meijer Gardens & Sculpture Park, Grand Rapids, Michigan
- Museum of Modern Art, New York
- National Gallery of Art, Washington, DC
- National Museum of Women in the Arts, Washington, D.C.

== Awards ==
- Grand Prix of São Paulo Biennale, São Paulo, Brazil (1965)
- Herder Prize, Vienna, Austria (1979)
- Jurzykowski Prize, New York City (1982)
- Award for Distinction in Sculpture, granted by the Sculpture Center, New York (1993)
- Commander Cross with Star of the Order of Polonia Restituta (1998)
- Pour le Mérite for Sciences and Arts, Berlin, Germany (1999)
- Officier de L'Ordre des Arts et des Lettres, Paris, France (1999)
- Leonardo da Vinci World Award of Arts, Norway (1999)
- Knight of the Order of Merit of the Italian Republic (2000)
- Visionaries! Award granted by American Craft Museum (2000)
- Lifetime Achievement in Contemporary Sculpture Award, International Sculpture Center, (Hamilton, NJ) (2005)
- Grand Cross of Merit of the Federal Republic of Germany with a star (2010)

On 20 June 2023 she was the subject of a Google Doodle.

== Doctorates and honors ==
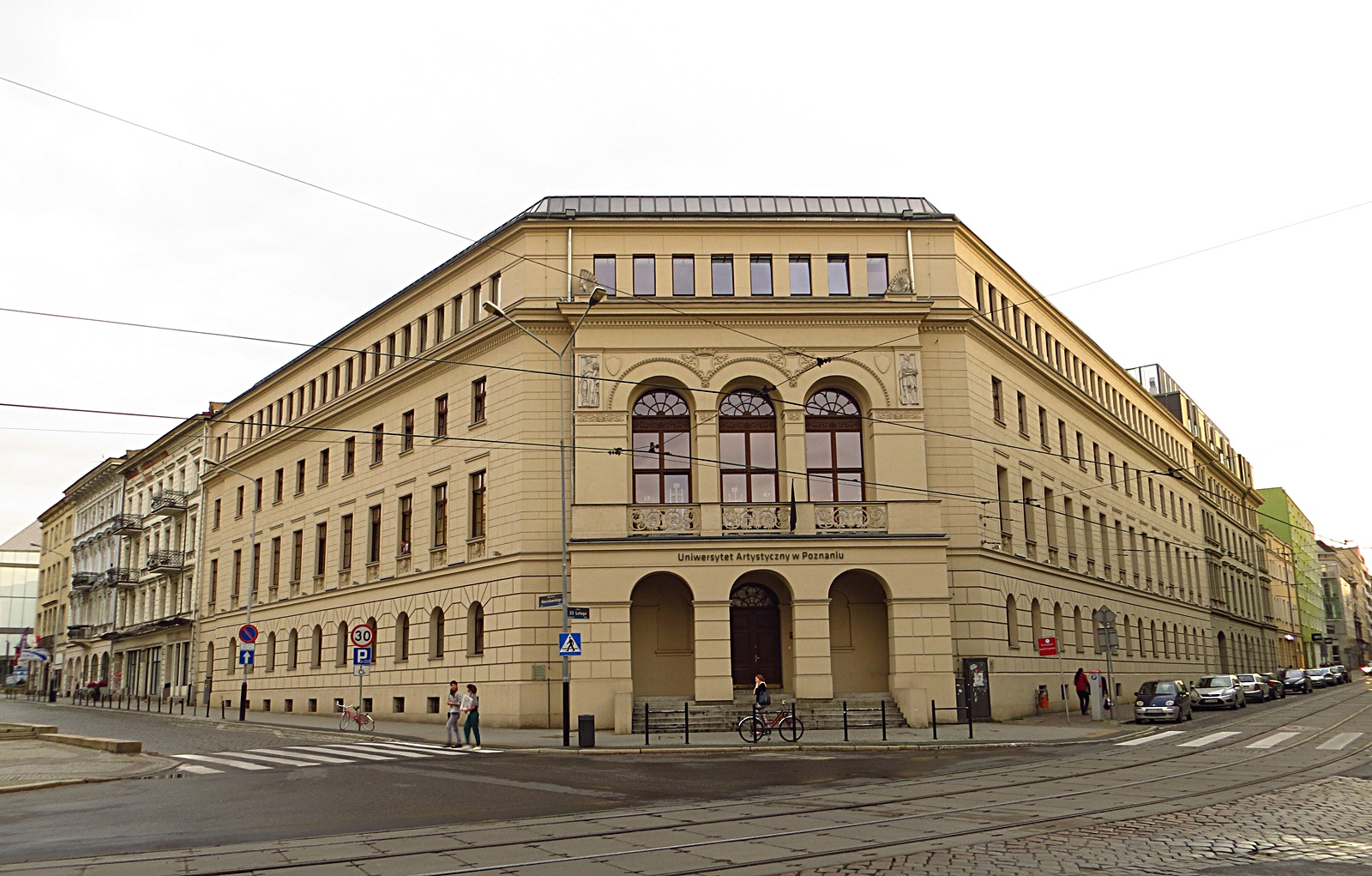
University of Fine Arts in Poznań, Poland, which bears Abakanowicz's name since January 2021

- Honoris Causa doctorate from the Royal College of Art, London, England (1974)
- Honoris Causa doctorate from the Rhode Island School of Design, Providence, Rhode Island (1992)
- Honorary member of the Academy of Arts, Berlin (1994)
- Honorary member of the American Academy of Arts and Letters, New York City (1996)
- Honorary member of the Sachsische Akademie der Kunste, Dresden, Germany (1998)
- Honoris Causa doctorate from the Academy of Fine Arts, Łódź, Poland (1998)
- Honorary Doctor of Fine Arts degree, Pratt Institute, New York (2000)
- Honoris Causa doctorate from the Massachusetts College of Art, Boston, Massachusetts (2001)
- Honoris Causa doctorate from the University of Fine Arts in Poznań, Poland (2002)
- Honoris Causa doctorate from the School of the Art Institute of Chicago, Chicago, Illinois (2002)

== Quotes ==
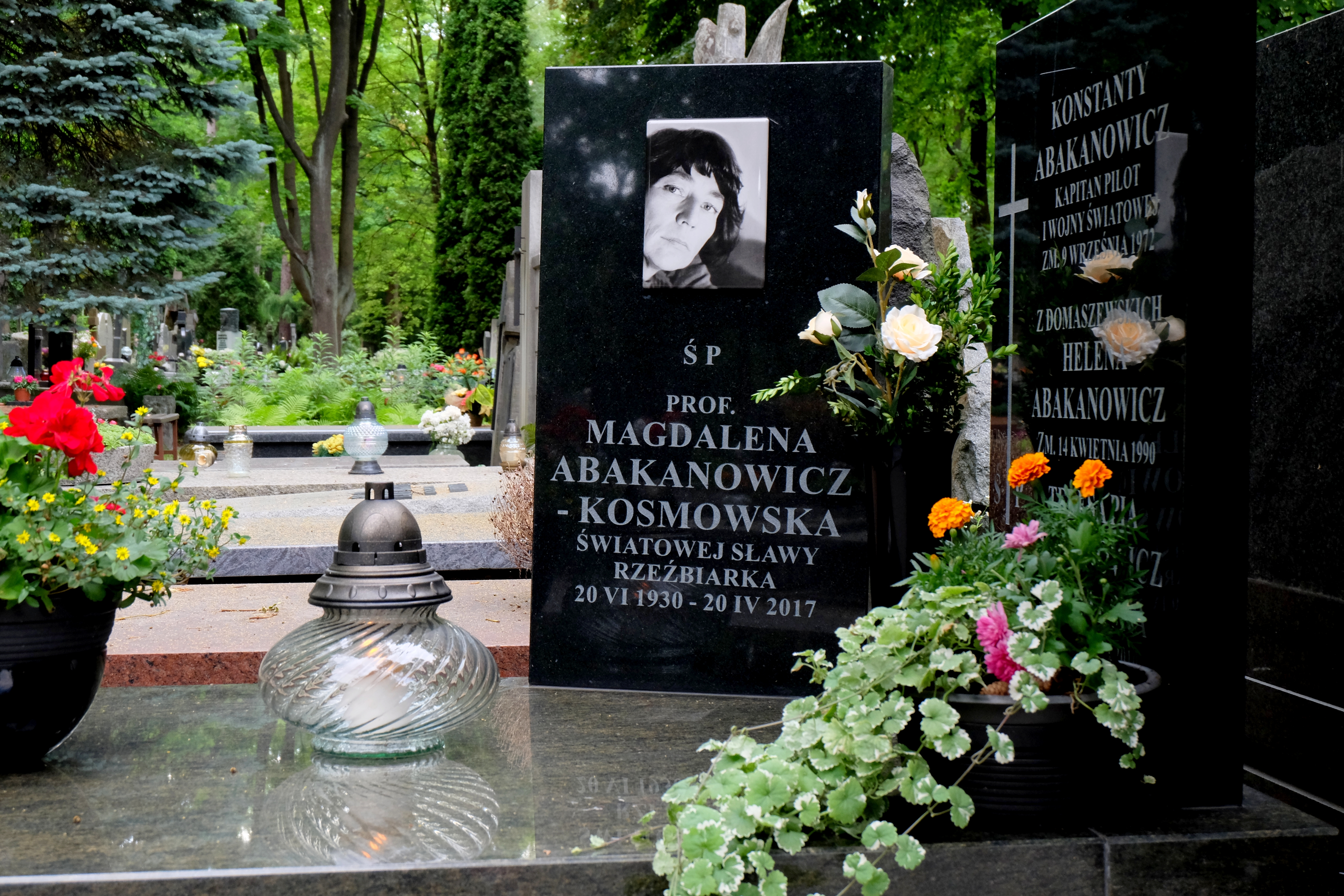
Abakanowicz's tombstone at the Powązki Military Cemetery in Warsaw, Poland

"I feel overawed by quantity where counting no longer makes sense. By unrepeatability within such a quantity. By creatures of nature gathered in herds, droves, species, in which each individual, while subservient to the mass, retains some distinguishing features. A crowd of people, birds, insects, or leaves is a mysterious assemblage of variants of certain prototype. A riddle of nature's abhorrence of exact repetition or inability to produce it. Just as the human hand cannot repeat its own gesture, I invoke this disturbing law, switching my own immobile herds into that rhythm."

"Art will remain the most astonishing activity of mankind born out of struggle between wisdom and madness, between dream and reality in our mind."

== See also ==
- Abakanowicz
- List of Polish artists

== Bibliography ==
- Reichardt, Jasia. Magdalena Abakanowicz. New York: Abbeville Press, 1982. 188 pp. 152 color and BW illus. ISBN 0896593231
- Abakanowicz, Magdalena, et al. Magdalena Abakanowicz. Davidson College, 2010.
- Inglot, Joanna. The Figurative Sculpture of Magdalena Abakanowicz: Bodies, Environments, and Myths. Berkeley and Los Angeles, Calif.: University of California Press, 2004. ISBN 9780520231252
- Miller, Nancy, et al. Figuratively Speaking : Drawings by Seven Artists. Neuberger Museum, State University of New York at Purchase, 1989.
- Magdalena Abakanowicz in libraries (WorldCat catalog)
