= Trégastel =

Trégastel Tregastell
- Commune
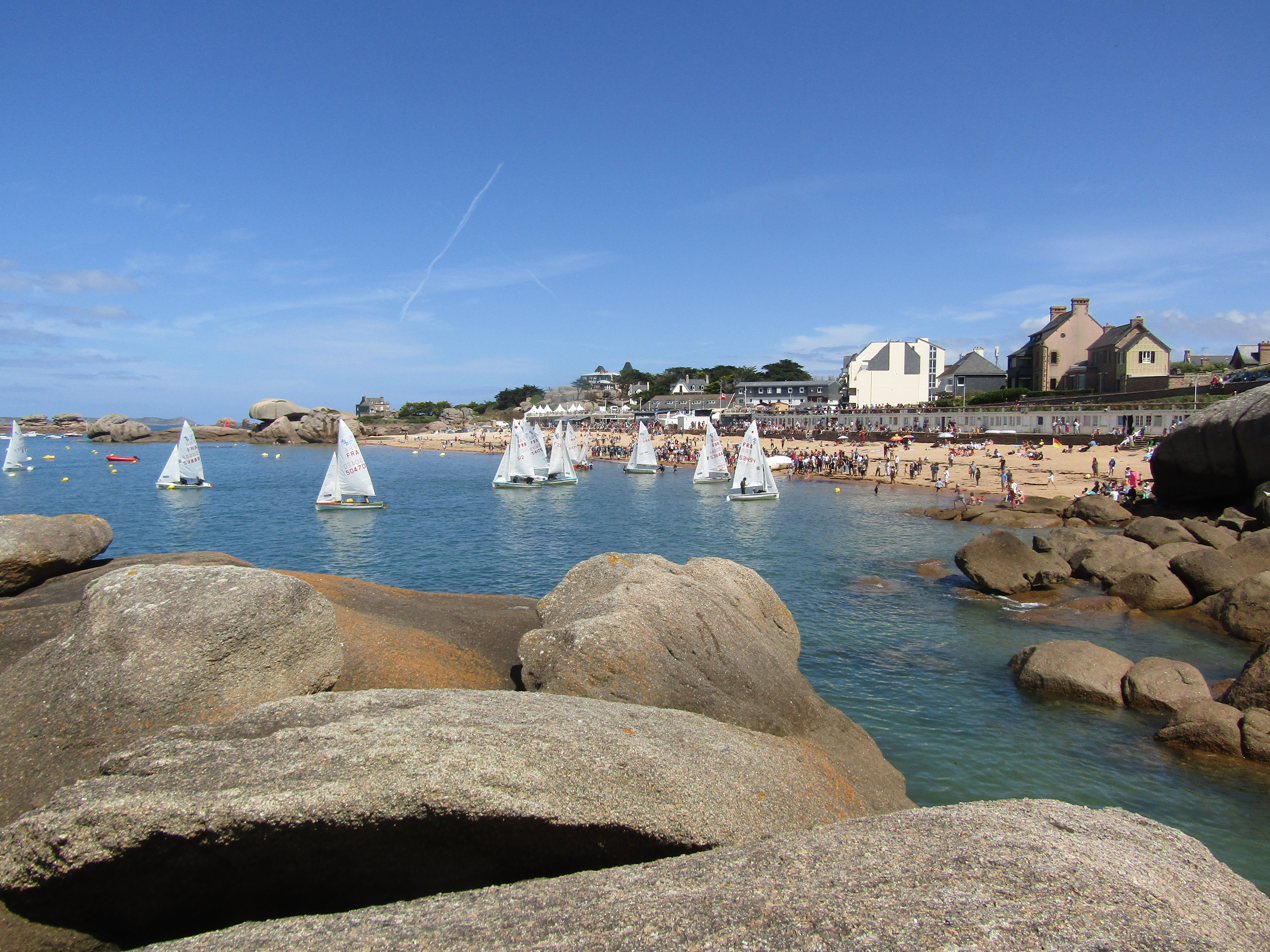
- Trégastel beach

- Coat of arms
- Location of Trégastel
- Location within France Location within Brittany
- Coordinates: 48°48′41″N 3°29′56″W
- Country: France
- Region: Brittany
- Department: Côtes-d'Armor
- Arrondissement: Lannion
- Canton: Perros-Guirec
- Intercommunality: Lannion-Trégor Communauté

Government
  - Mayor (2020–2026): Xavier Martin
- Area^{1}: 7.00 km^{2} (2.70 sq mi)
- Highest elevation: 71 m (233 ft)
- Lowest elevation: 0 m (0 ft)
- Population (2023): 2,524
  - Density: 361/km^{2} (934/sq mi)
- Time zone: UTC+01:00 (CET)
  - Summer (DST): UTC+02:00 (CEST)
- INSEE/Postal code: 22353 /22730
- ^{1} French Land Register data, which excludes lakes, ponds, glaciers > 1 km^{2} (0.386 sq mi or 247 acres) and river estuaries.

Trégastel (French pronunciation: [tʁeɡastɛl]; Breton: Tregastell) is a commune in the Côtes-d'Armor department of the region of Brittany in northwestern France.

Trégastel is situated between Perros-Guirec and Pleumeur-Bodou. Lannion is ten kilometres (6.2 mi) away.

== Population ==
Inhabitants of Trégastel are called trégastellois in French.

Historical population

Year	Pop.	±% p.a.
1793	867	—
1800	659	−3.84%
1806	709	+1.23%
1821	862	+1.31%
1831	944	+0.91%
1836	1,011	+1.38%
1841	985	−0.52%
1846	1,031	+0.92%
1851	1,113	+1.54%
1856	1,036	−1.42%
1861	1,078	+0.80%
1866	1,080	+0.04%
1872	1,086	+0.09%
1876	1,078	−0.18%
1881	1,096	+0.33%
1886	1,141	+0.81%
1891	1,108	−0.59%
1896	1,224	+2.01%
1901	1,250	+0.42%

Year	Pop.	±% p.a.
1906	1,361	+1.72%
1911	1,286	−1.13%
1921	1,320	+0.26%
1926	1,467	+2.13%
1931	1,398	−0.96%
1936	1,449	+0.72%
1946	1,521	+0.49%
1954	1,687	+1.30%
1962	1,670	−0.13%
1968	1,742	+0.71%
1975	2,013	+2.09%
1982	2,063	+0.35%
1990	2,201	+0.81%
1999	2,234	+0.17%
2007	2,397	+0.88%
2012	2,451	+0.45%
2017	2,465	+0.11%
2023	2,524	+0.39%

Source: EHESS and INSEE (1968-2023)

== Breton language ==
The municipality launched a linguistic plan through Ya d'ar brezhoneg in February 2008.

In 2008, 16.5% of primary school children attended bilingual schools.

== International relations ==
=== Twin towns – sister cities ===
Trégastel is twinned with:

- Foz, Galicia, Spain (2003)
- Koussané, Mali (2004)

== Religious monuments ==
- St Laurent Church in the bourg
- Ste Anne des rochers chapel
- St Golgon chapel

== The Costaérès castle ==
In 1892, Bruno Abakanowicz bought a small island called Costaérès in Trégastel, where by 1896 he had erected a neo-Gothic manor.

== Marine aquarium of Trégastel ==
Since 1967, Trégastel has been home to a marine aquarium, built within a large, naturally occurring, outcrop of pink granite rocks.

== Gallery ==
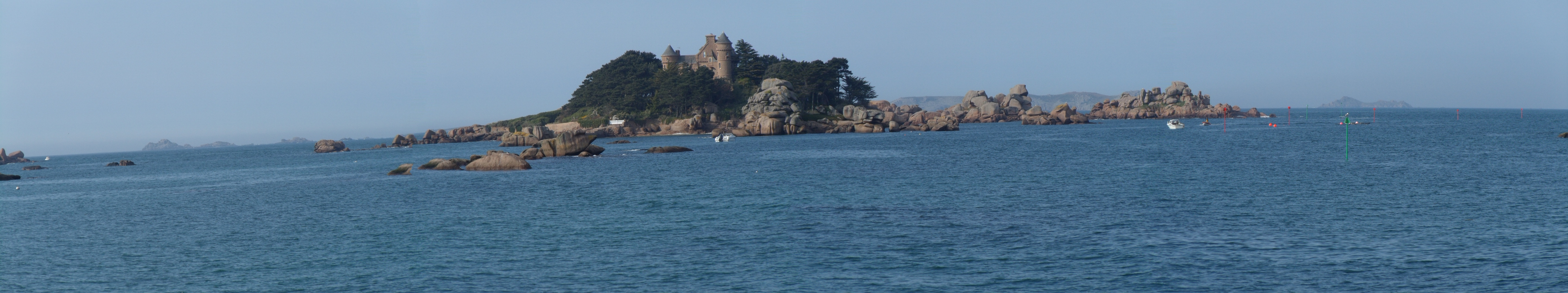
The château de Costaérès in Trégastel, and the seven islands in the background

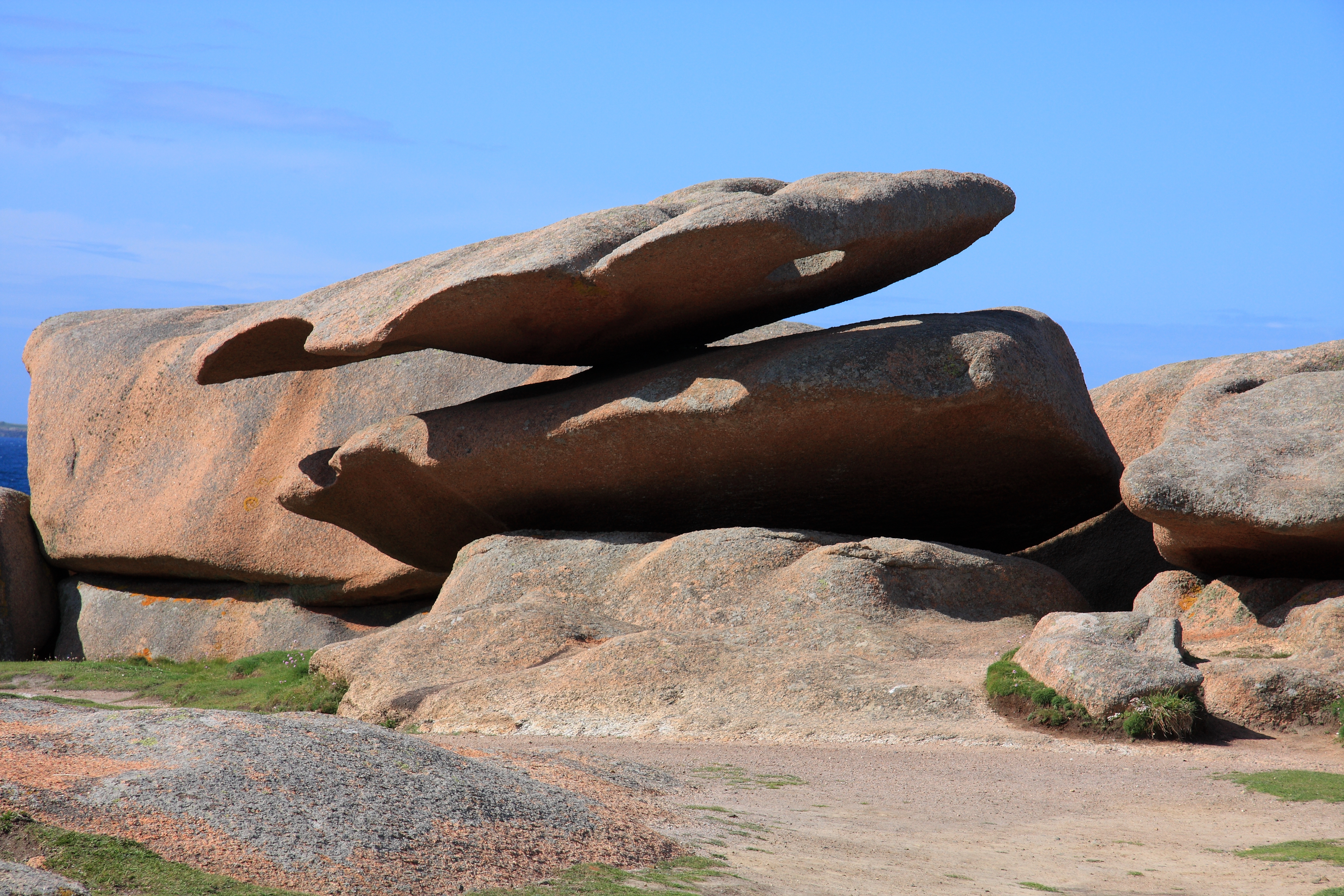
La palette du peintre
(The painter's palette)

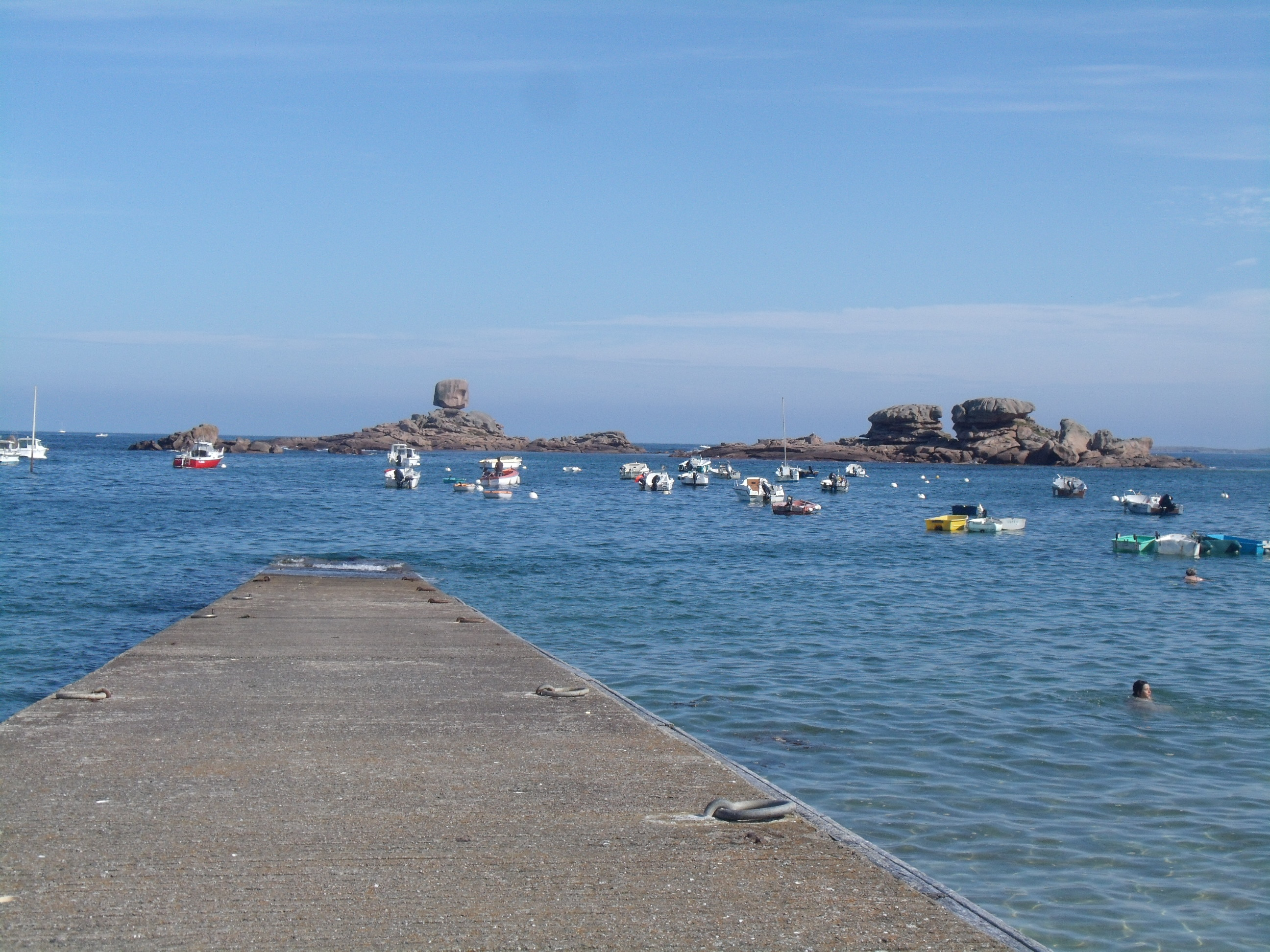
Le dé (The dice) and
Les tortues (The turtles)

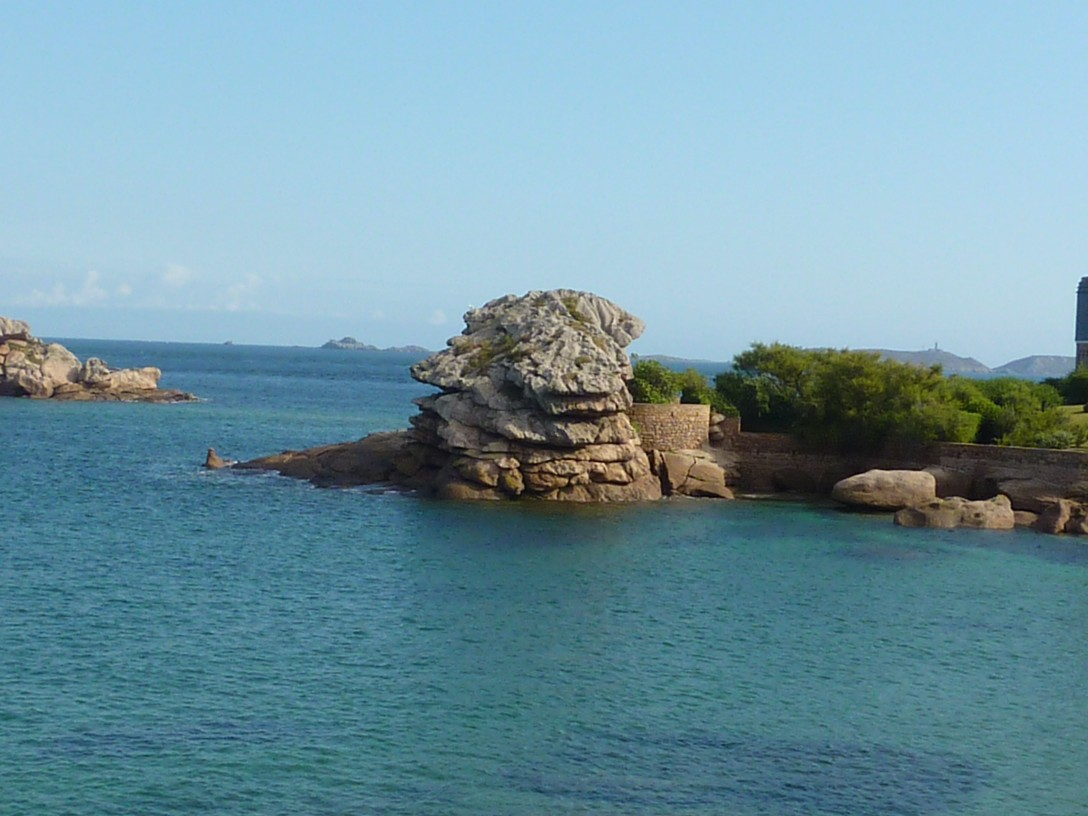
Le tas de crêpes
(The pile of crêpes)

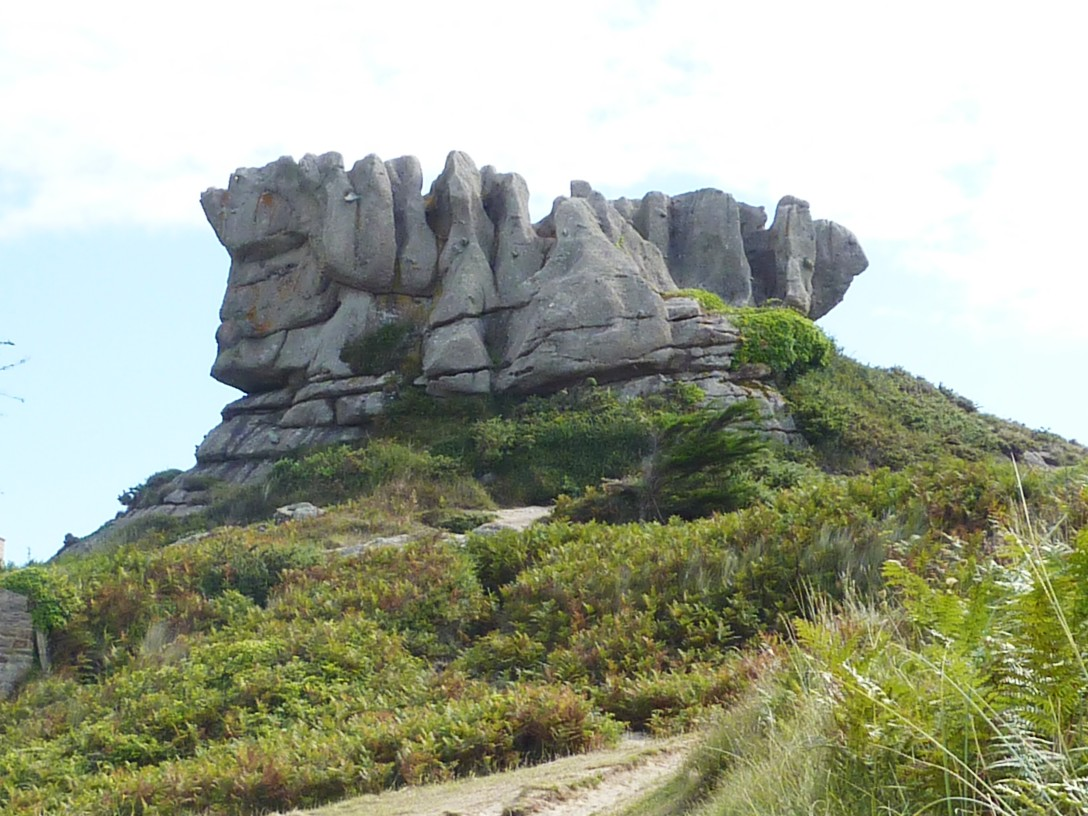
Le Roi Gradlon
(Gradlon King)

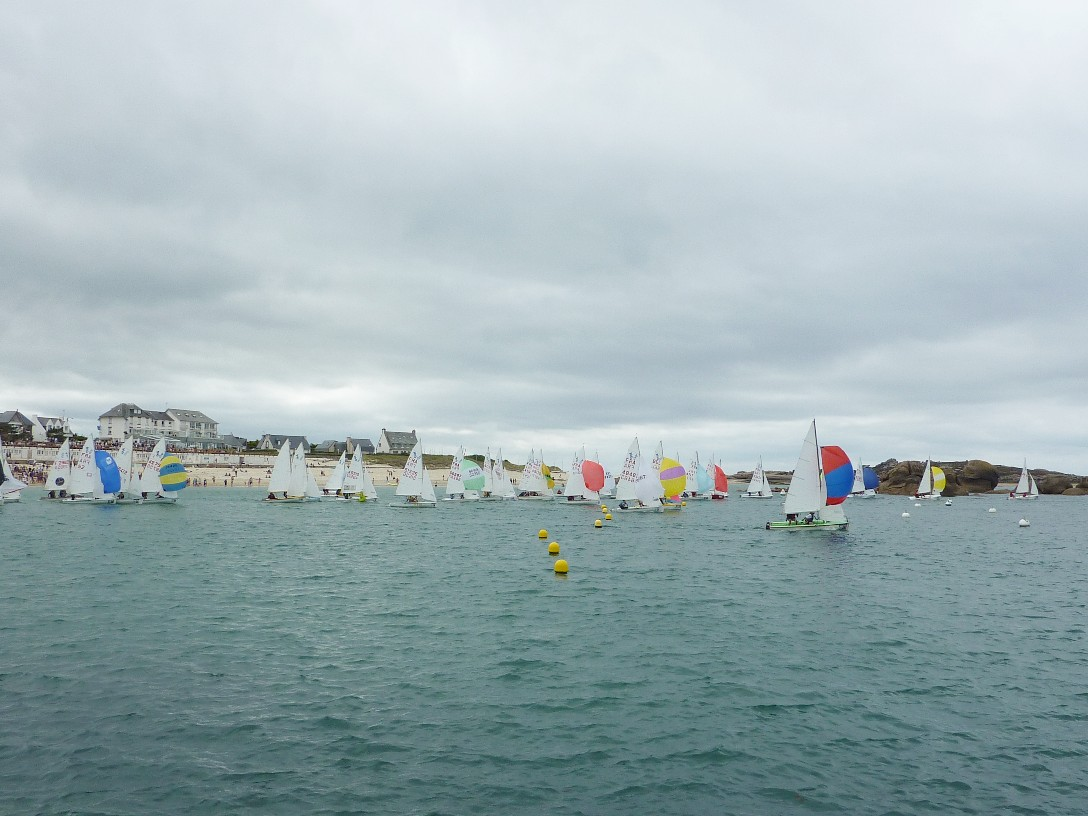
24h de la voile regatta

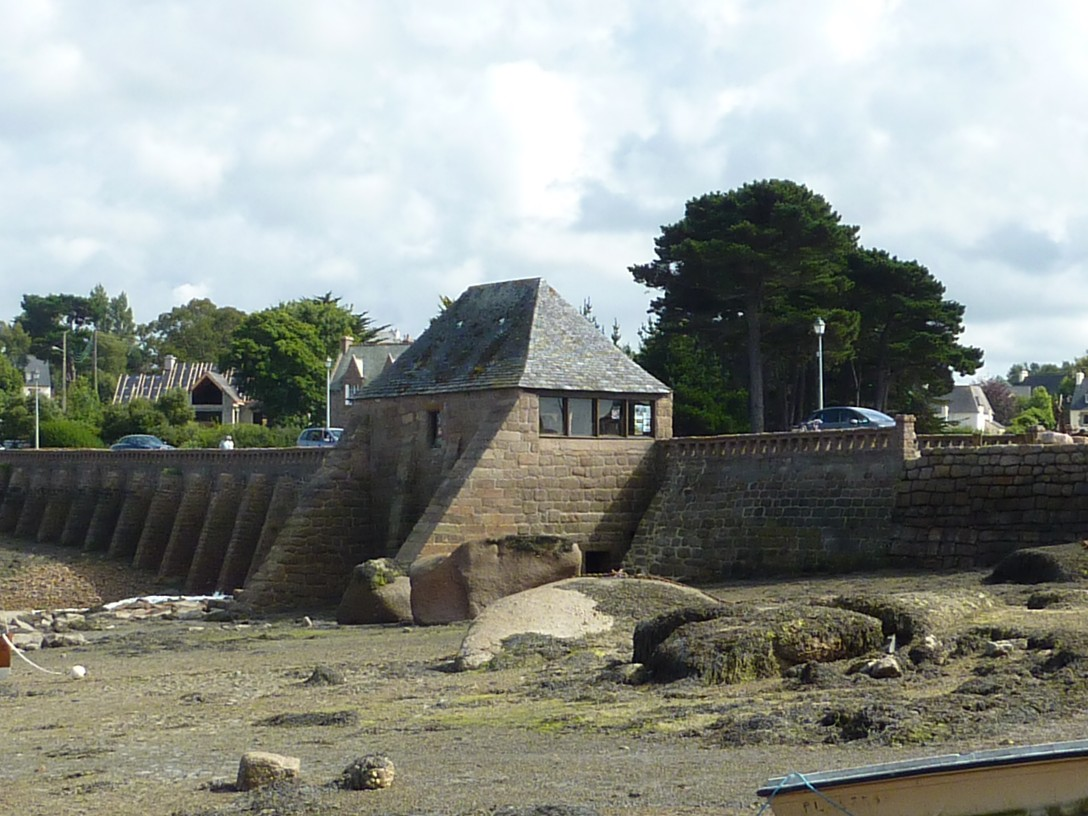
The tide mill on Ploumanac'h Road

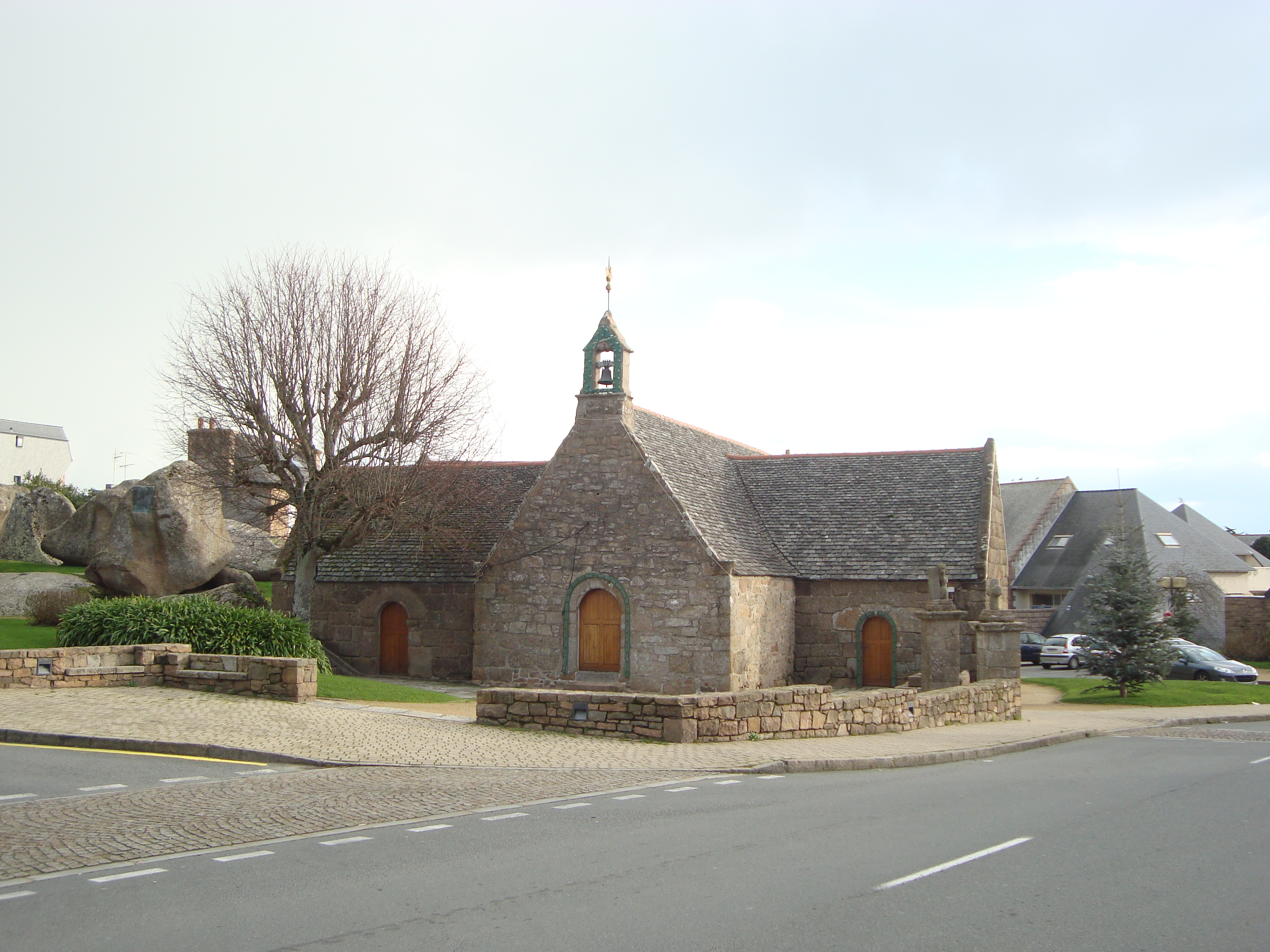
Ste-Anne-des-Rochers chapel

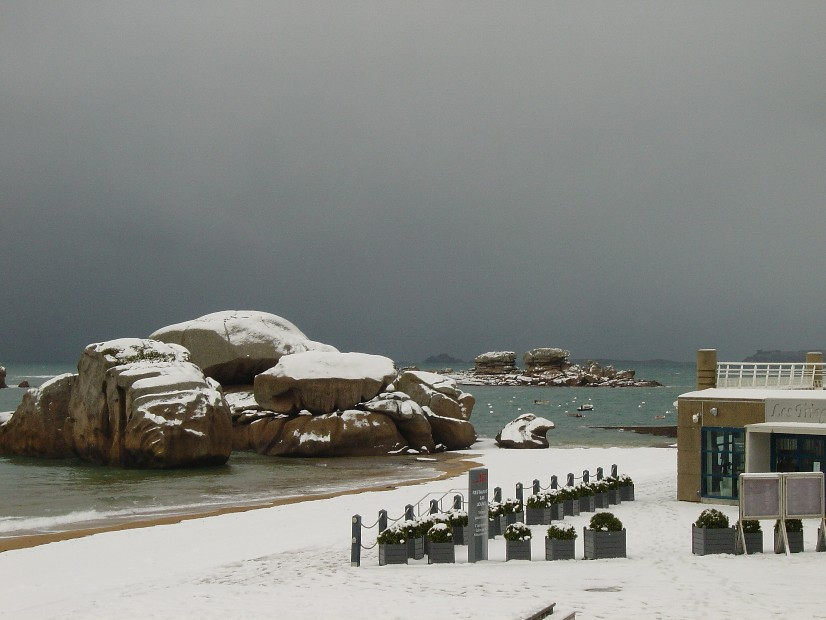
December 2010

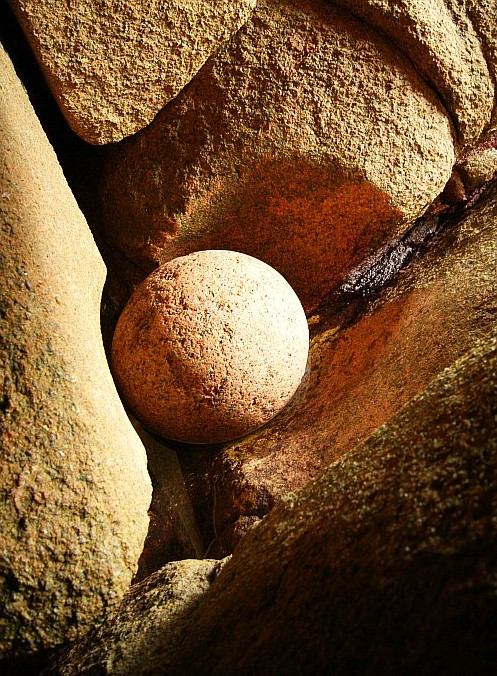
Natural granite ball (2–3 ft in diameter) close to Renote Island

== See also ==
- Communes of the Côtes-d'Armor department
- Jentilez
