= Agora (sculpture) =

Installation of 106 headless and armless iron sculptures at Grant Park in Chicago

- The installation, viewed from the north

- Location in Chicago
- Artist: Magdalena Abakanowicz
- Location: Chicago, Illinois, United States; 41°52′06″N 87°37′24″W

Agora is an installation of 106 headless and armless iron sculptures at the south end of Grant Park in Chicago, Illinois. Designed by Polish artist Magdalena Abakanowicz, they were made in a foundry near Poznań between 2004 and 2006. In 2006, the Chicago Park District brought the work to Chicago as a permanent loan from the Polish Ministry of Culture. Similar installations have been constructed throughout the world, but Agora is among the largest.

== History and description ==
Chicago, which has a large Polish American community, had hoped to add a major work by Abakanowicz for several years before Agora arrived. Among the plans which were not realized were a large hand to be placed at the end of BP Pedestrian Bridge and a set of animal sculptures to be placed near the Monroe Street harbor. One proposal called for a group of headless figures be placed in Chicago's Museum Campus. Chicago Mayor Richard M. Daley eventually suggested placing an installation at the south end of Grant Park, near Roosevelt Road. By 2006, private donors, including actor Robin Williams, contributed over $700,000 to bring the work to Chicago.

The figures are 9 ft (2.7 m) tall and weigh approximately 1,800 lb (820 kg). Each is made from a hollow, seamless piece of iron that has been allowed to rust, creating a reddish appearance and a bark-like texture. The figures appear to be milling about in a crowd; some face each other, while others look away. Visitors are meant to walk through the sculptures and contemplate the work.

The name Agora refers to the urban meeting places of the Ancient Greek city-states. Abakanowicz, who grew up during World War II, has said that her art draws on her fear of crowds, which she once described as "brainless organisms acting on command, worshiping on command and hating on command". However, the work has inspired optimistic interpretations. Kevin Nance of the Chicago Sun-Times wrote, "If they had arms and hands (they don't), these would be clasped behind their backs as if in contemplation. They seem, somehow, to be thinking, not as a group but as individuals. [...] It's possible, in fact, to interpret the piece as a representation of democracy."

Agora by Magdalena Abakanowicz, in the south end of Grant Park, Chicago, Illinois, near the intersection of Michigan Avenue and East Roosevelt Road. The entire installation is about 300 feet (91 m) long.

== Reception ==
Agora received a mixed response from the people of Chicago. "I get e-mails from people loving it and people hating it. There's nothing in between," said Bob O'Neill. Mayor Daley lauded the work, saying, "You've got to go through it yourself to feel the spirit of the artist and each piece of artwork."

== See also ==
- List of public art in Chicago
