= GR 34 =

Walking path

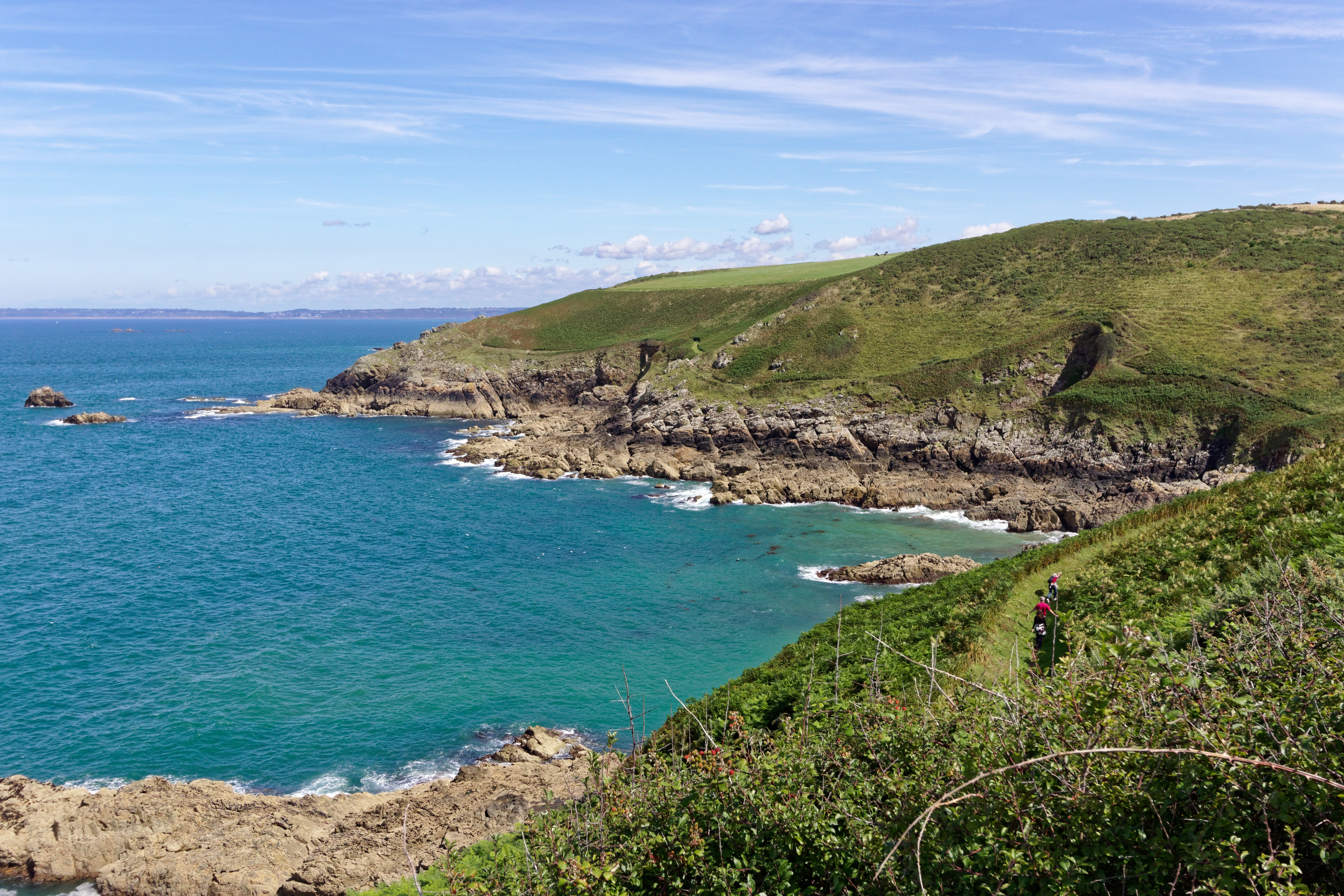
- The GR 34 winding along the coast at Guimaëc in Finistère
- Length: 1,700 km (1,100 mi)
- Location: France, Manche, Ille-et-Vilaine, Loire-Atlantique
- Designation: GR footpath
- Trailheads: Mont-Saint-Michel 48.636°N 1.5114°W; Saint-Nazaire 47.2806°N 2.2086°W
- Use: Long distance trail

The long-distance hiking trail 34 (French: Sentier de grande randonnée 34 or GR 34 for short; Breton: Hent bale hir 34) is a French coastal path that starts from Mont-Saint-Michel (Manche) and ends in Saint-Nazaire (Loire-Atlantique). It runs along almost the entire coast of the Brittany region from Mont Saint-Michel and, beyond the limit between Morbihan and Loire-Atlantique, to the mouth of the Loire. It stretches over 1,700 kilometres (1,100 miles). It largely follows former customs paths. These paths, gradually abandoned during the first half of the 20th century, allowed customs officers to patrol the coast from their guardhouses, located at key observation points on the Brittany coast.

== Origins ==
The Breton coastal path has its origins in the late 18th century, after the French Revolution. Among the measures adopted by the National Constituent Assembly (1789–1791) at the end of the Ferme générale was the creation on 23 April 1791 of the National Customs Authority (French: Régie nationale des douanes). By a decree of 5 November 1790, the Constituent Assembly thus abolished all internal borders and decided to "retreat customs to the borders".

It was in this context that the Breton customs officers' path was created in 1791. The men, who ensured the surveillance in pairs, took turns every two hours and had the task of monitoring the coasts and fighting smuggling. Along the path, gabions, cabins, huts, straw huts and many small dry-stone constructions built by the customs officers themselves provided places to stop. They are in addition to the official positions provided by the Customs Administration.

The objectives of the path were fourfold:

- to stop contraband, especially that due to illegal landings of English goods
- to defend the coasts, with the creation, from 1831, of a military customs body
- to rescue shipwreck victims and ensure that inhabitants did not loot stranded ships
- to carry out police missions

== Recent history ==
- 1968: the first long-distance hiking trail, between Beg Leguer and Pors Mabo (in Trébeurden) near Lannion (Côtes-d'Armor), was initiated by Émile Orain, (Note: Émile Orain was a teacher on secondment to youth and sports in Lannion, regional president of youth hostels, from the 1940s he was used to taking young people on a "walk". In 1967, when the Service for Studies and Tourism Development in Rural Areas (French: Service d'études et d'aménagement touristique de l'espace rural or SEATER, 1966–1990) wanted to extend the network of ten existing GRs in France, Émile Orain became the referent for the region.) who in 1967 mobilized friends and youth groups to clear this section of the pink granite coast.
- 1974: the National Committee for Long-Distance Hiking Trails created the first section of the long-distance hiking trail in Finistère, linking Douarnenez to Faou. It belonged to the GR 37, but part would be linked to the GR 34.
- 1976: the law of easement of passage by the sea (law no. 1285 of December 31, 1976) was passed, meaning that "The riparian properties of the public maritime domain are encumbered, on a strip 3 meters wide, to leave a right of way intended to ensure exclusively the passage of pedestrians."
- 1978: the French Federation of Hiking in Brittany was created.
- 2008: the complete markup of the Breton GR was completed, the hiker being able to cover its 1,700 km in one go.
- 2017: the Finistère section was elected as the Best French GR of 2017.

== Route ==
=== Manche ===
- Mont-Saint-Michel
- River Couesnon
Manche
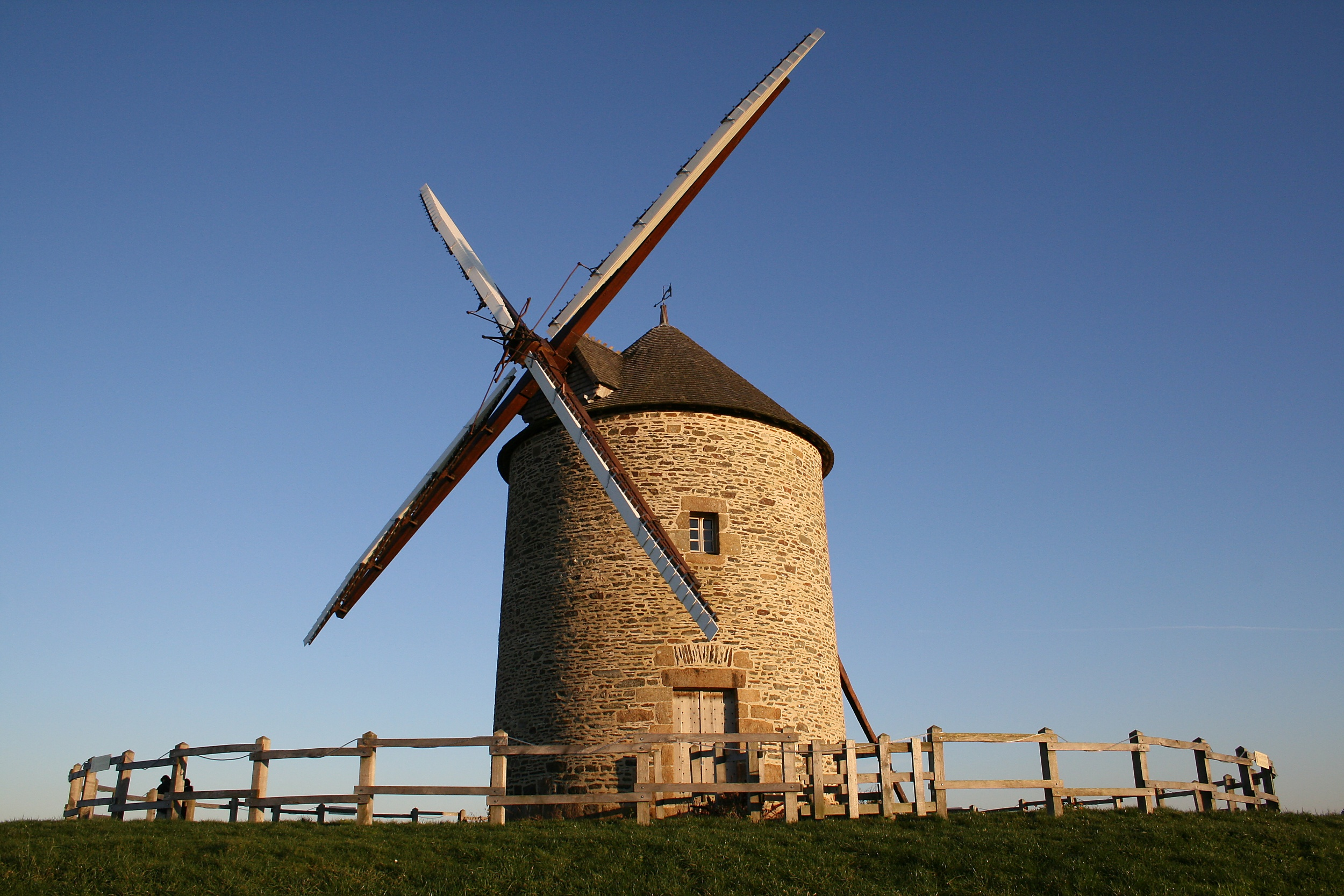
Le moulin de Moidrey, Pontorson

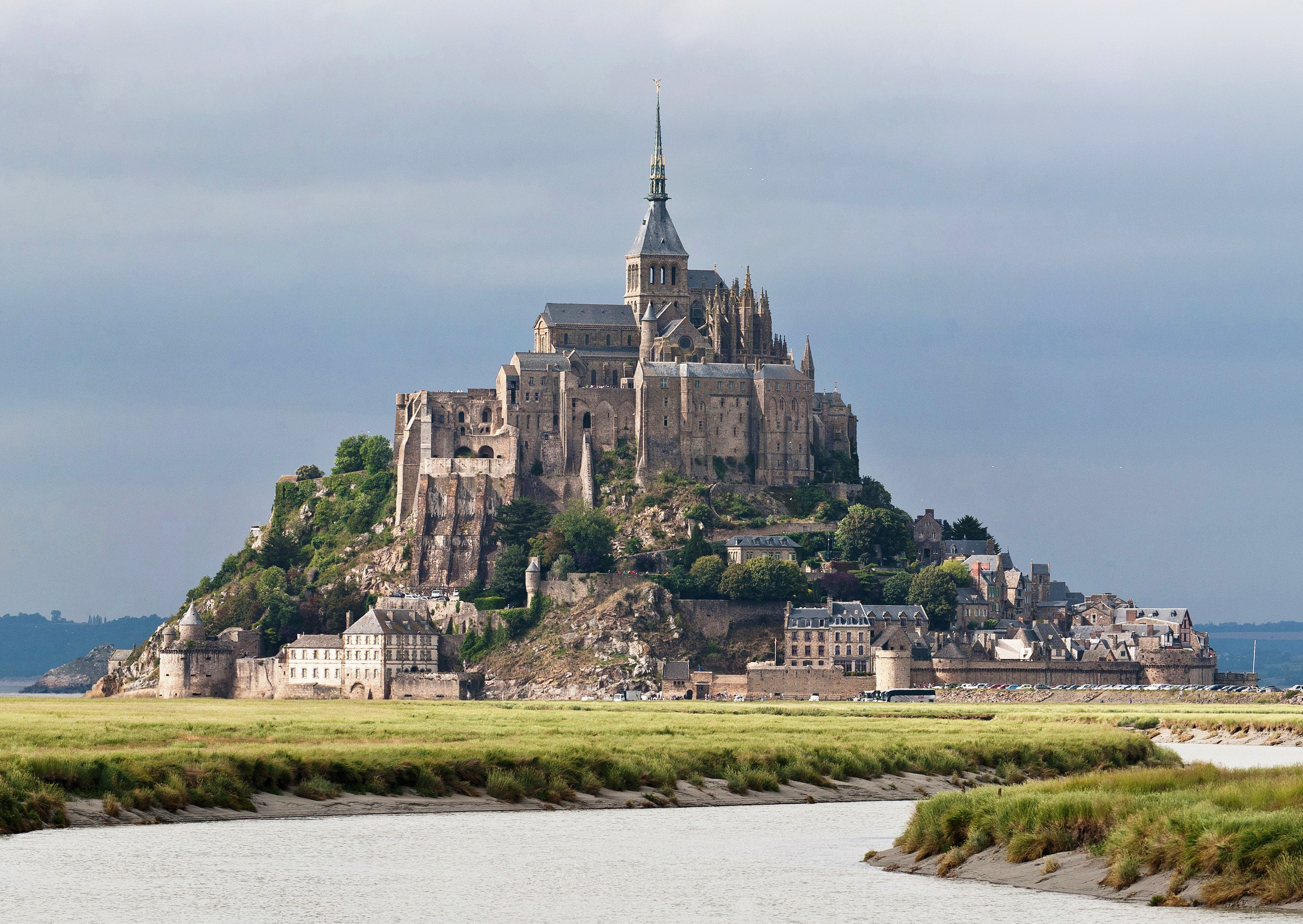
Mont Saint-Michel

=== Ille-et-Vilaine ===
- Dol-de-Bretagne
  - Cathedral of Saint-Samson de Dol-de-Bretagne (13th–15th-century).
- Church and windmill of Mont-Dol.
- Cancale
  - Church of Saint-Méen.
- Saint-Malo
- Dinard
Ille-et-Vilaine
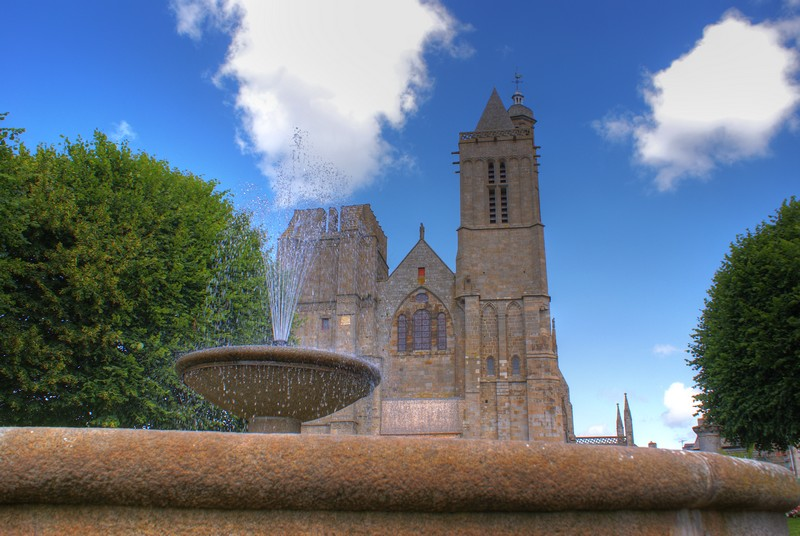
Cathedral of Saint-Samson de Dol-de-Bretagne

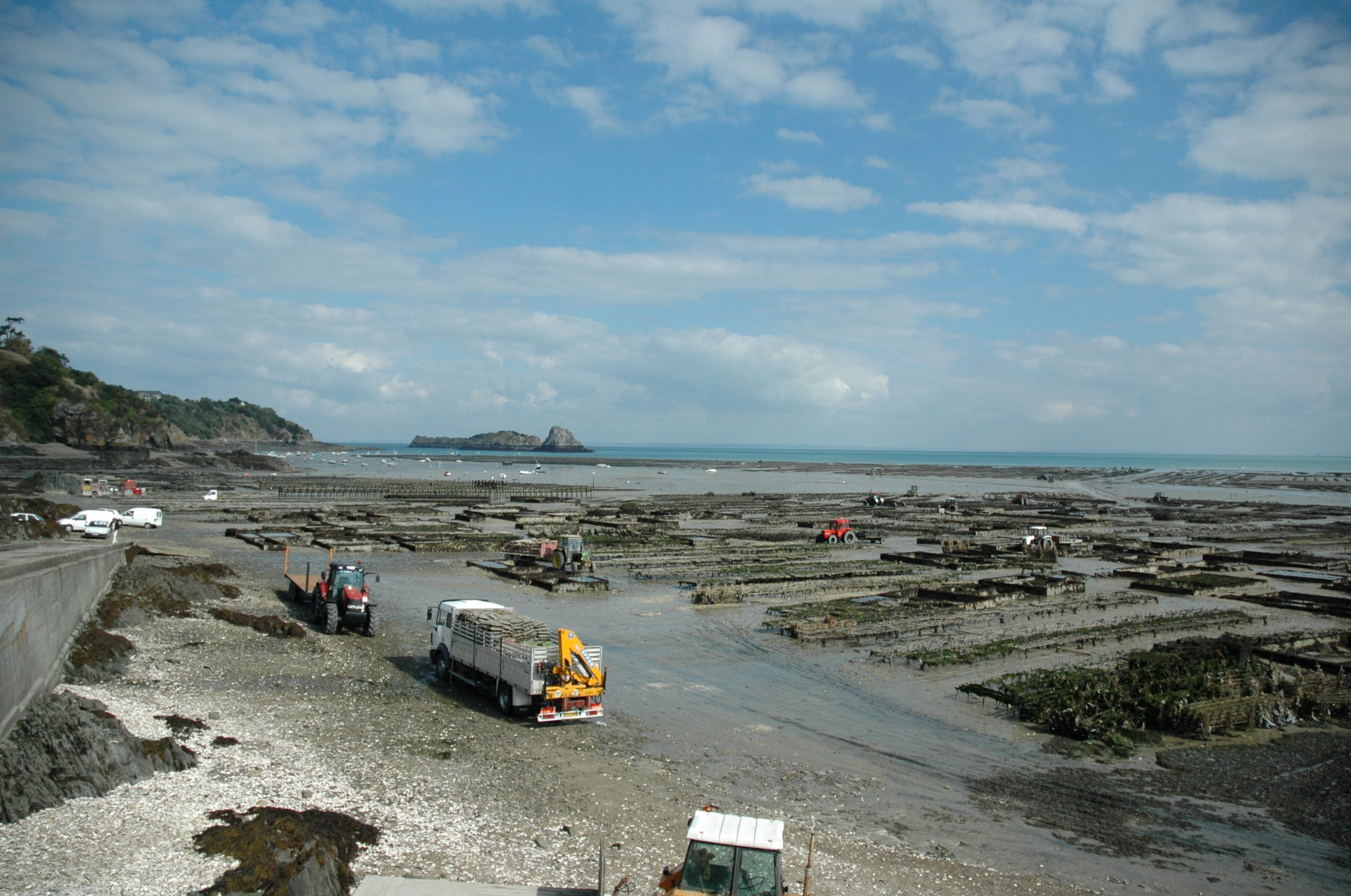
Oyster parks in Cancale

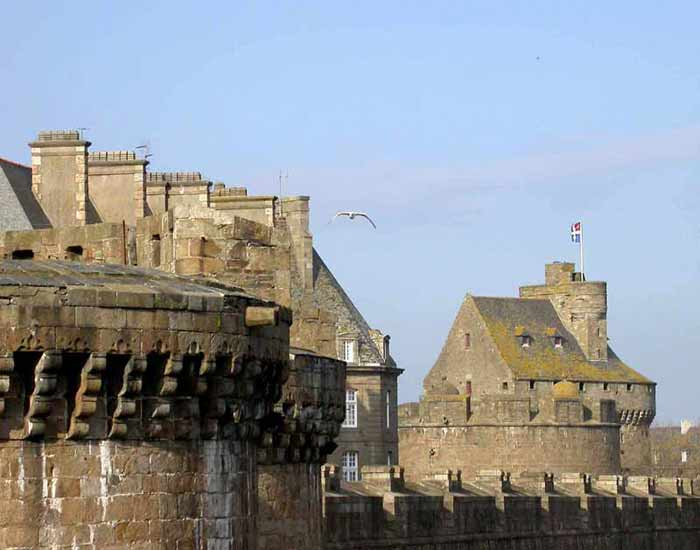
Ramparts of Saint-Malo

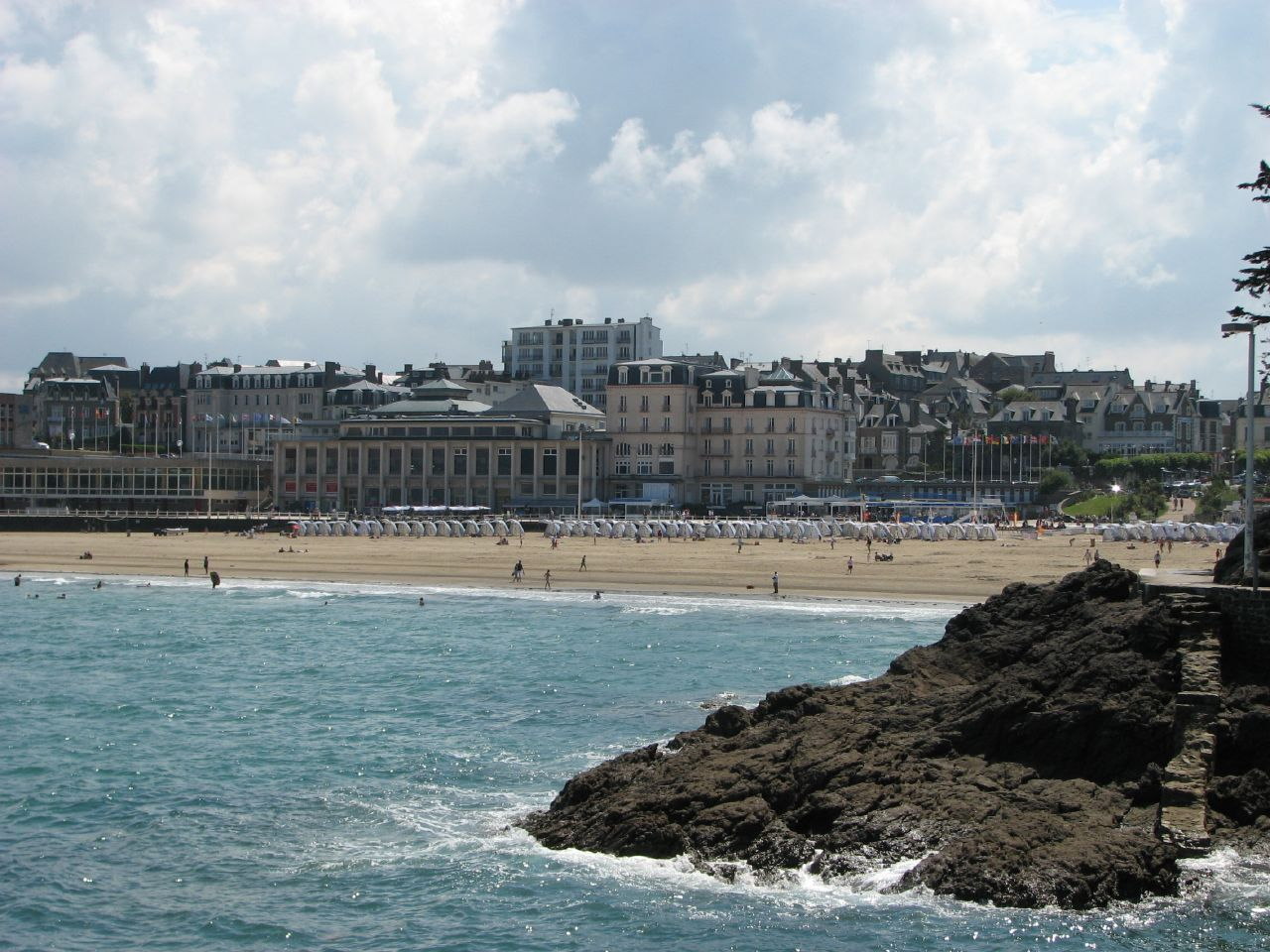
Beach of Plage de l'écluse, Dinard

=== Côtes-d'Armor ===
- Saint-Cast-le-Guildo
- Cap Fréhel
- Erquy
- Saint-Brieuc
- Côte de Granit Rose
  - Perros-Guirec
  - Ploumanac'h
  - Trégastel
  - Trébeurden
- Lannion
Côtes-d'Armor
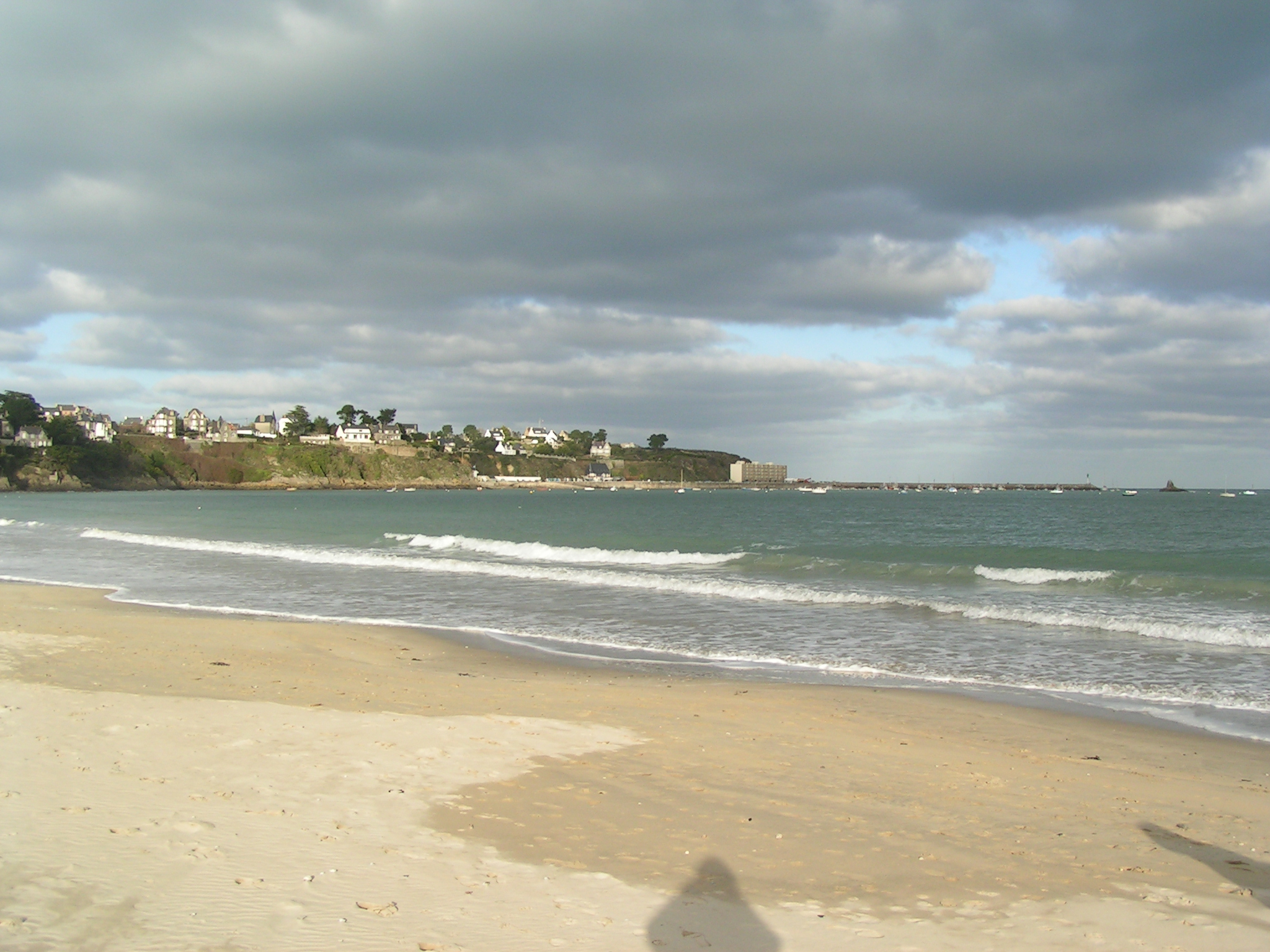
The beach of Saint-Cast

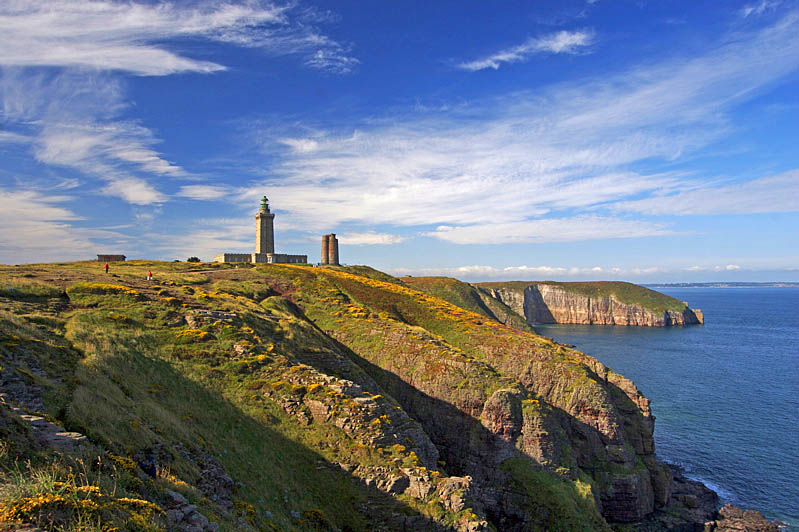
The cliffs of Cap Fréhel

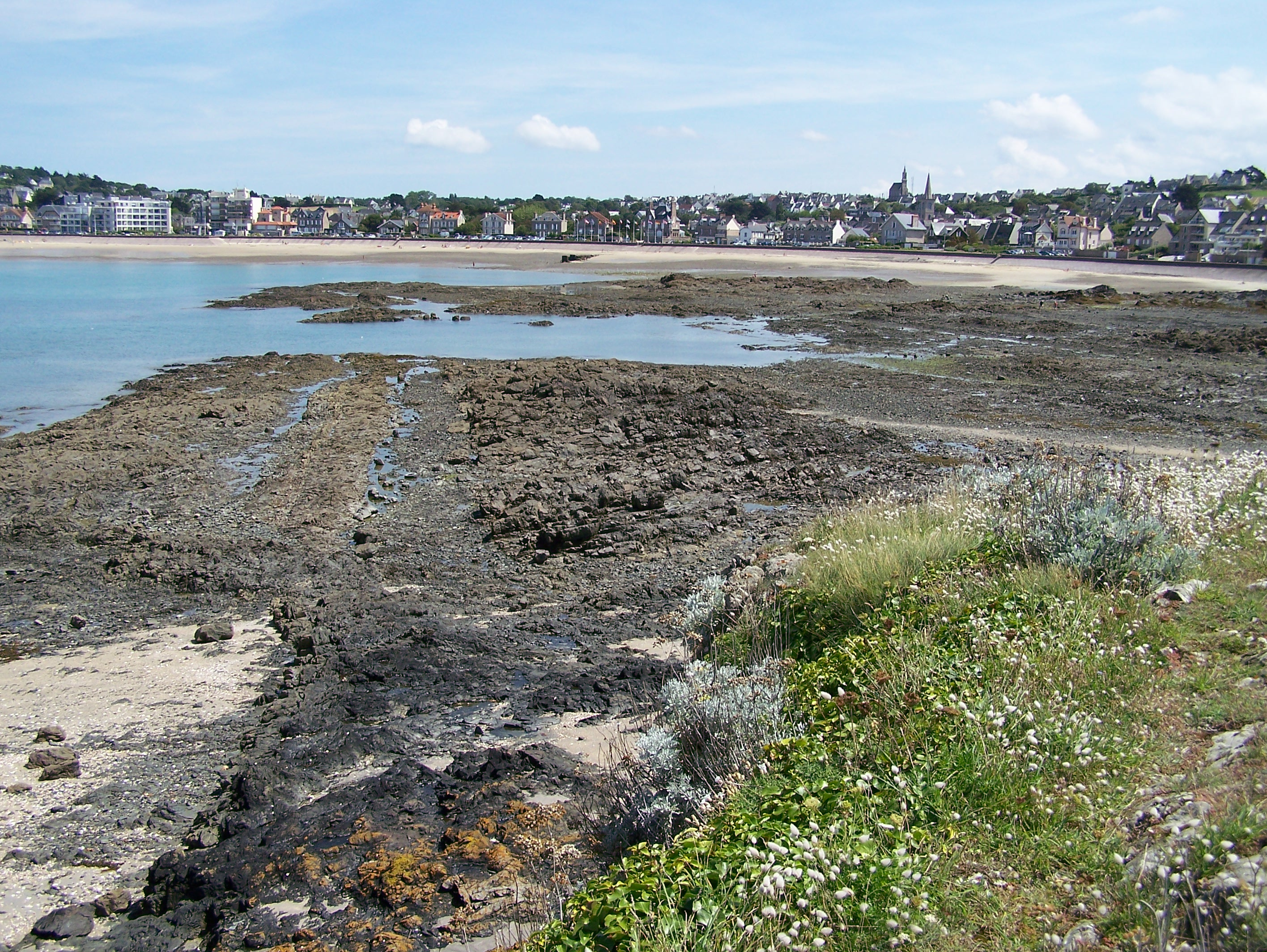
Great beach of Erquy

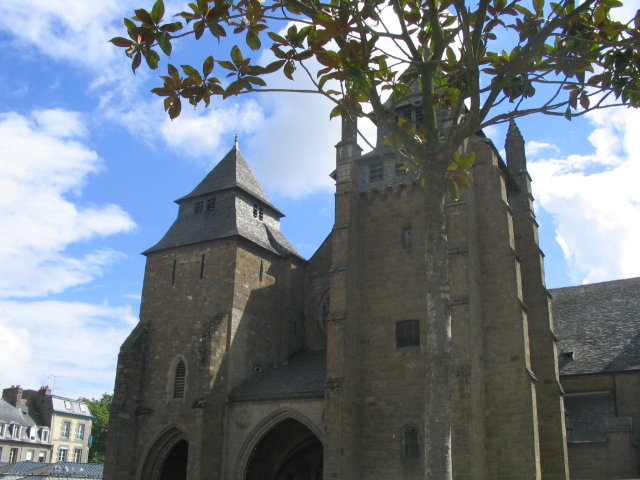
Saint-Brieuc Cathedral

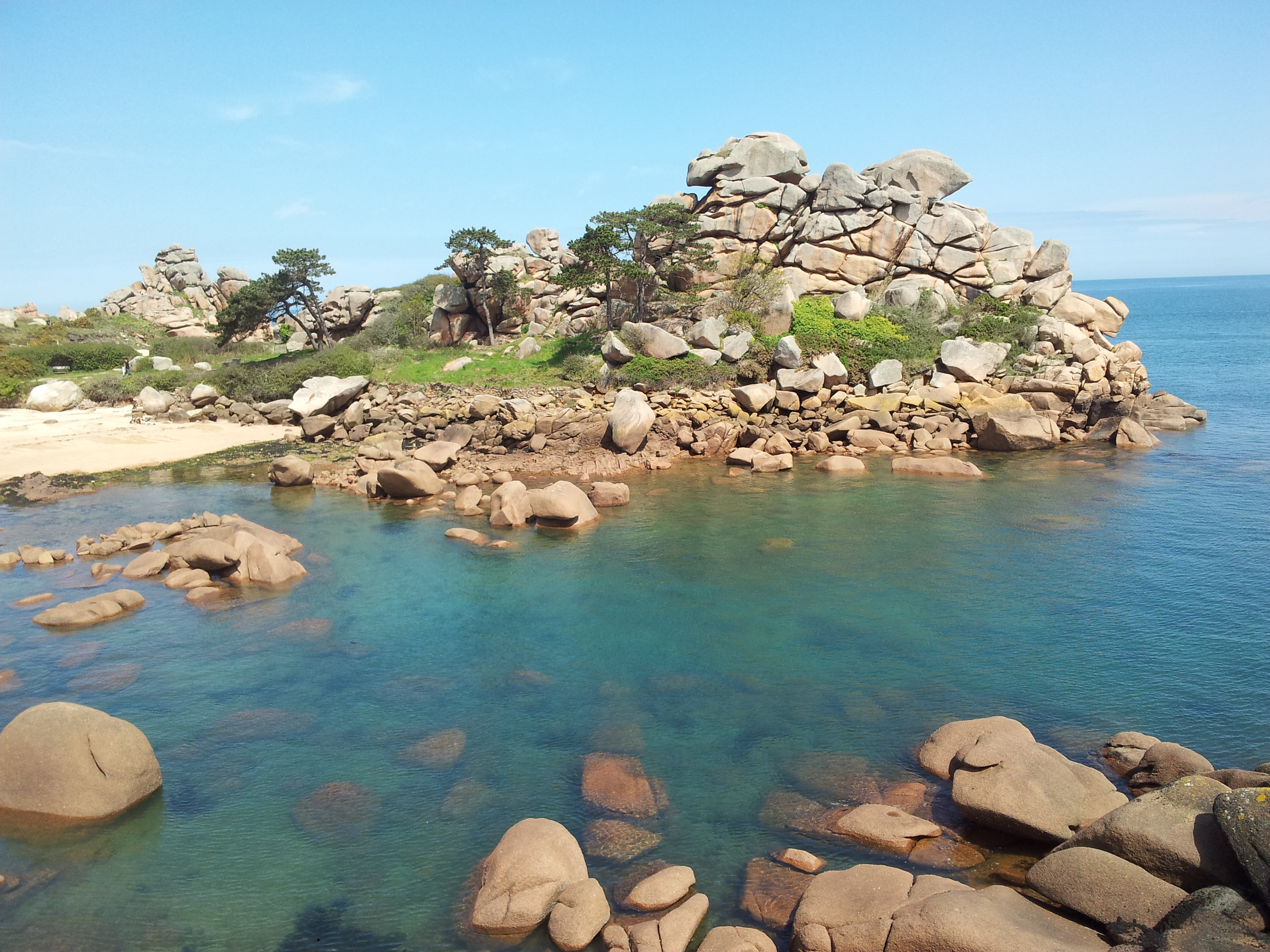
Perros-Guirec

=== Finistère ===
- Morlaix
- Roscoff
- Brest
- At Brélès the GR 34F forks inland and rejoins the coastal GR 34 at Portzic with its lighthouse and fort
- Crozon, the Parc naturel régional d'Armorique and the Monts d'Arrée further inland
- Douarnenez
- Plomodiern
- Cap Sizun and the Pointe du Raz
- Loctudy
- Pont-Aven

=== Morbihan ===
- Lorient
- Quiberon
- Auray
- Vannes
- La Roche-Bernard

=== Loire-Atlantique ===
- Le Croisic
- La Turballe
- La Baule
- Pornichet
- Brière Regional Natural Park
- Saint-Nazaire

== Economy ==
In 2018, the trail was used by 9 million users, 40% of whom were locals and 60% tourists. The local economic benefits are estimated at 202 million euros.

== See also ==
- Tro Breizh
