= Ploumanac'h Lighthouse =

Lighthouse in Côtes-d'Armor, France

Ploumanac'h lighthouse
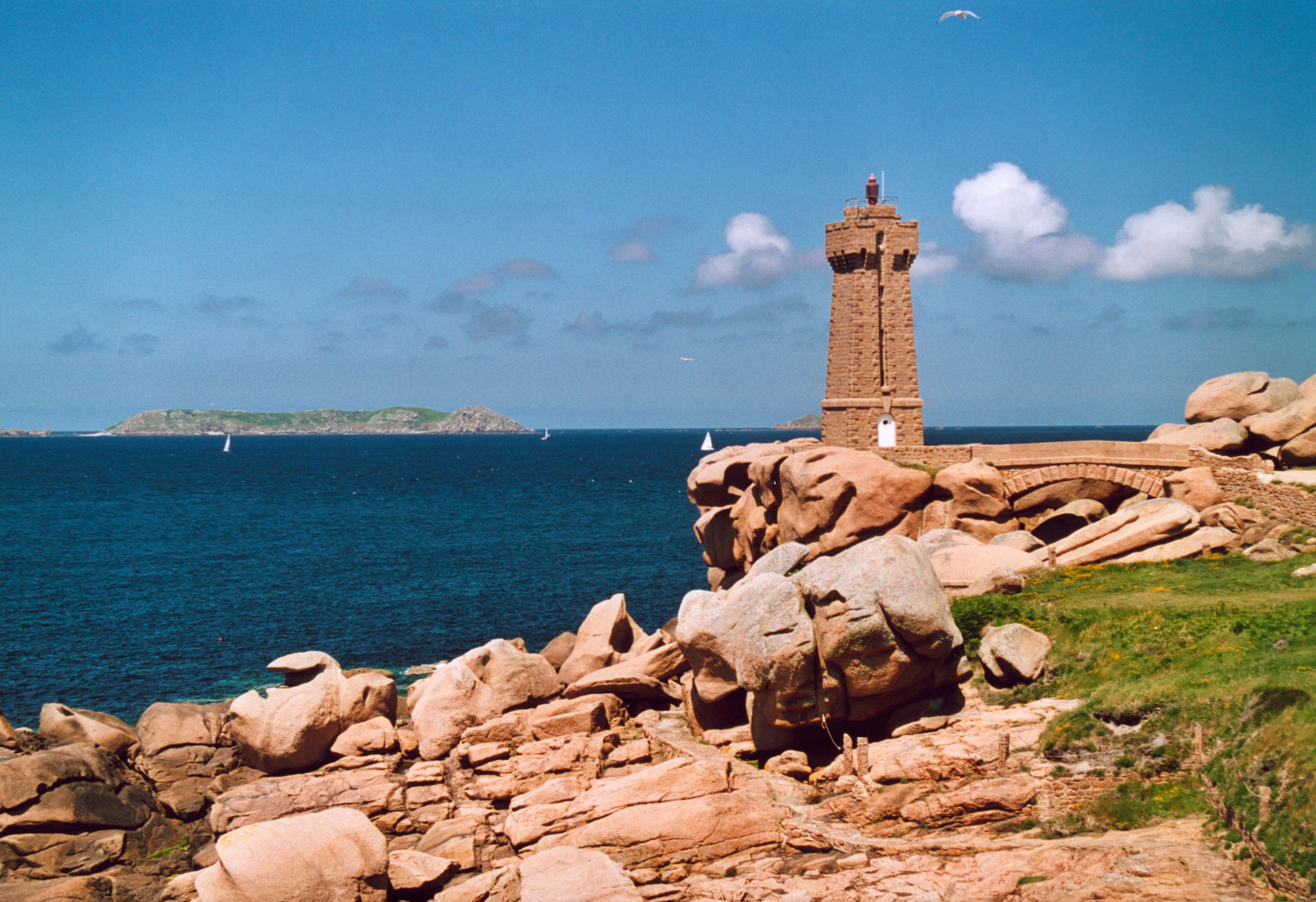
- The lighthouse on the Côte de Granit Rose
- Location: Perros-Guirec, Côtes-d'Armor, France
- Coordinates: 48°50′15″N 3°29′00″W

Tower
- Constructed: 1860 (first)
- Construction: red granite tower
- Height: 49 feet (15 m)
- Shape: tapered square tower with balcony and lantern
- Markings: unpainted tower, red lantern
- Heritage: listed in the general inventory of cultural heritage

Light
- First lit: 1948 (current)
- Focal height: 85 feet (26 m)
- Range: 12 nmi (22 km; 14 mi) (white), 9 nmi (17 km; 10 mi) (red)
- Characteristic: Occ. W R 4s

The Ploumanac'h Lighthouse (officially the Mean Ruz Lighthouse) is an active lighthouse in Côtes-d'Armor, France, located in Perros-Guirec. The lighthouse is closed to the public.

The structure is composed of pink granite, and marks the entrance to the channel leading to the port of Ploumanac'h.

== History ==
The first Ploumanac'h Lighthouse dates from 1860. This was destroyed by German troops on August 4, 1944, and replaced by the current lighthouse in 1946. The present-day version was planned by architect Henry Auffret, and built by Martin et frère (a local construction company).

The lighthouse offers a direct view of Château de Costaérès, l'île Renote and Jentilez.

== Etymology ==
The lighthouse gets its common name from the nearby town of Ploumanac'h, meaning "monk's pool" in Breton. The official name of "Mean Ruz" comes from the Breton cacographic phrase Maen Ruz, meaning "red stone".

== See also ==
- List of lighthouses in France
