= Saint Guirec =

French Roman Catholic saint

Saint Guirec (c. 6th century), according to oral tradition, was a Welsh monk who sought to establish a monastery in Celtic Brittany. In the region of Traou-Perros is where Guirec chose to found his new community.

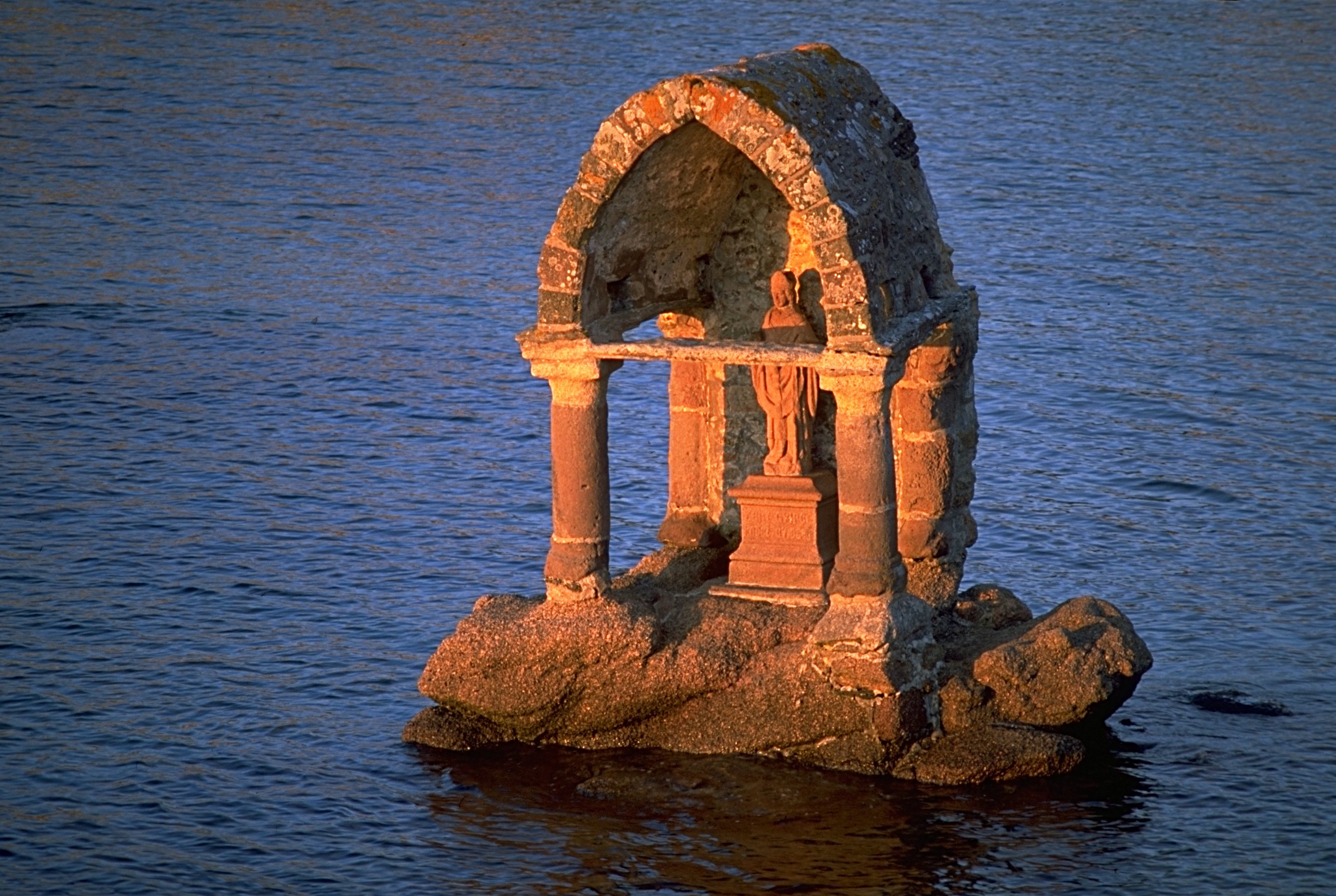
The Oratory of Saint-Guirec

He allegedly arrived in Brittany in a stone trough pulled by angels, landing on the small beach that now bears his name. A shrine first built in the 12th century called L'Oratoire de Saint-Guirec (the Oratory of Saint Guirec) stands in the bay at Ploumanac'h with a chapel on the facing beach. Female pilgrims have come for centuries to call upon the prayerful intercession of the monk saint for their seafaring husbands' safety. Young women also come to ask Guirec's prayers that they would soon find a husband. The tradition of putting a pin in the nose of the saint's statue is said to encourage Guirec to acquire the blessing of a marriage within one year for the young pilgrim. The 14th century wooden statue – the nose of which having consequently disappeared – was placed in the chapel and replaced by a stone statue in 1904.

Saint Guirec is commemorated locally by the Roman Catholic Church in Brittany in conjunction with a traditional Breton Pardon ceremony on the eve of the Feast of the Ascension of Christ into heaven. 'Ascension Day' is celebrated the fortieth day after Easter.

== See also ==
- Blessed Julian Maunoir, "Apostle of Brittany"
