= Coastal path =

Trail along a shore

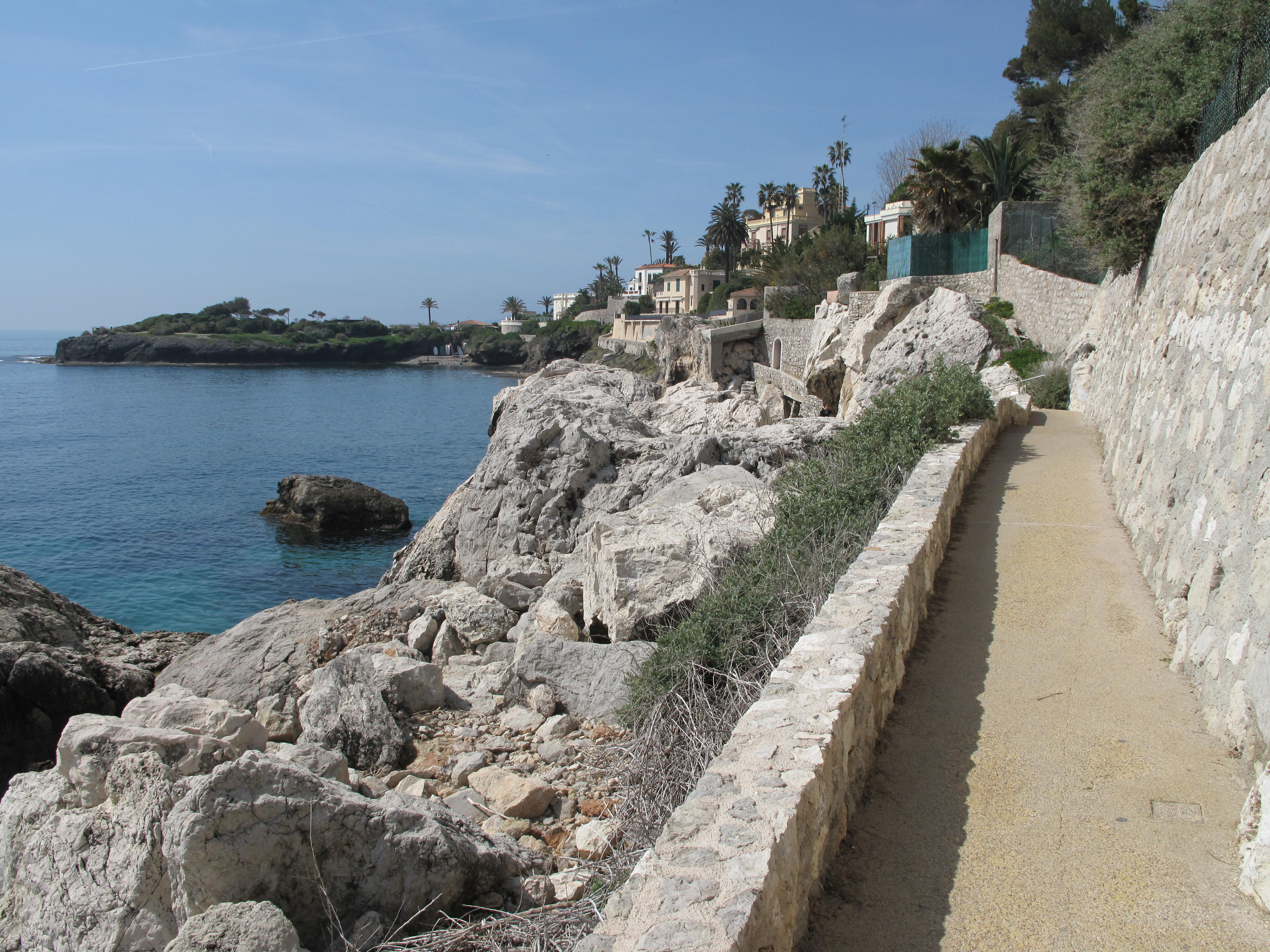
Coastal path on the Côte d'Azur in France.

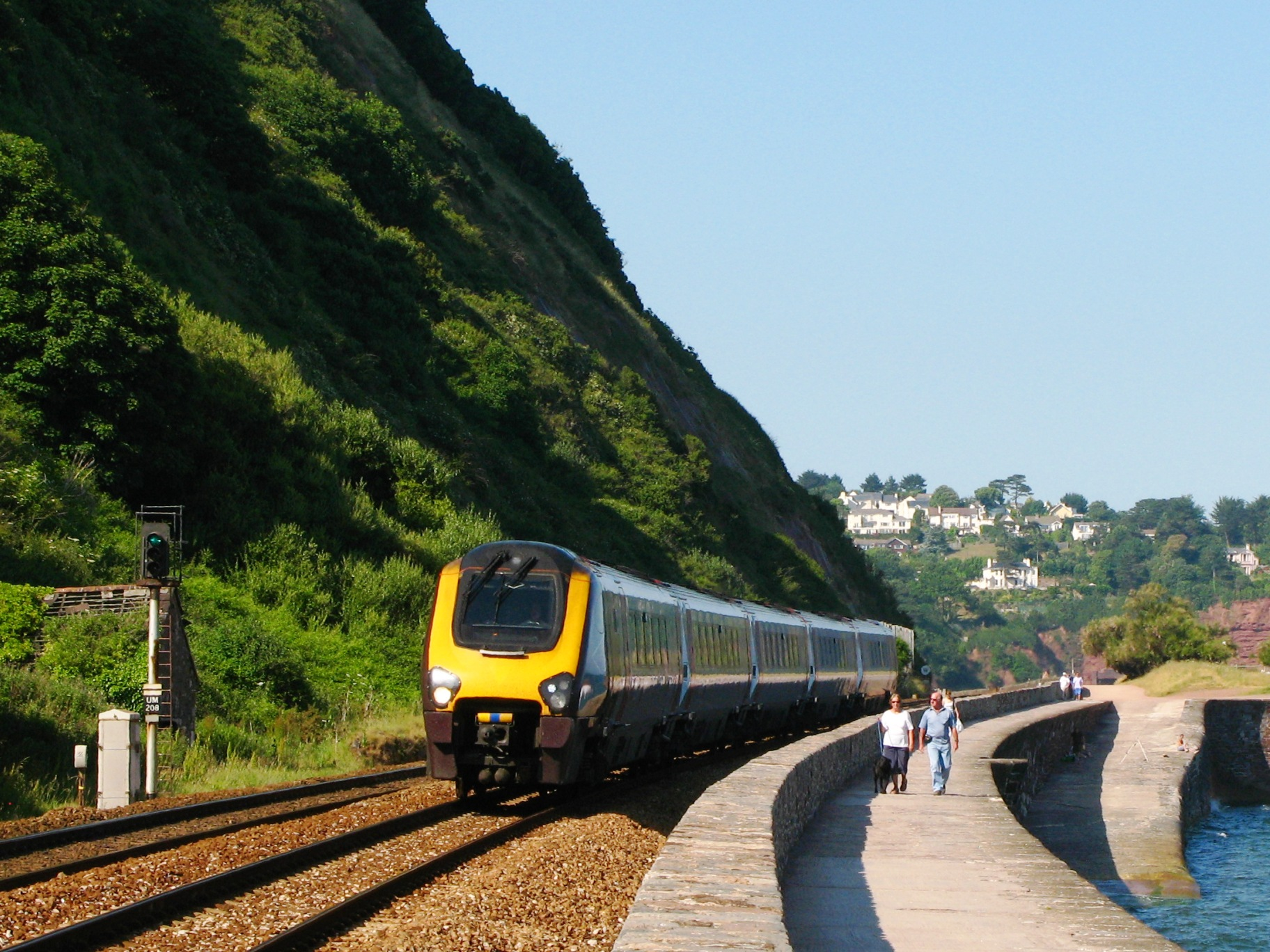
The South West Coast Path shares the sea wall between Teignmouth and Dawlish Warren with long distance and Riviera Line trains.

A coastal path (or a littoral path) is a trail along a sea shore or a lake shore for pedestrians, and sometimes for cyclists or equestrians.

Some coastal paths were originally created for use by customs or coastguard officials looking out for smugglers landing illicit goods. In modern times some routes have been developed for tourists, with facilities such as benches, waymarks and information boards.

== Examples of coastal paths ==
- California Coastal Trail, designed to connect the entire coast of California, United States
- GR 34, a path that runs along almost the entire coast of Brittany, France
- King Charles III England Coast Path, a long-distance trail that follows the coastline of England
- South West Coast Path, a trail from Minehead in Somerset, along the coasts of Devon and Cornwall, to Poole Harbour in Dorset, England
- Wales Coast Path, a long-distance trail which follows, or runs close to, the coastline of Wales
