= Perros-Guirec =

Perros-Guirec Perroz-Gireg
- Commune
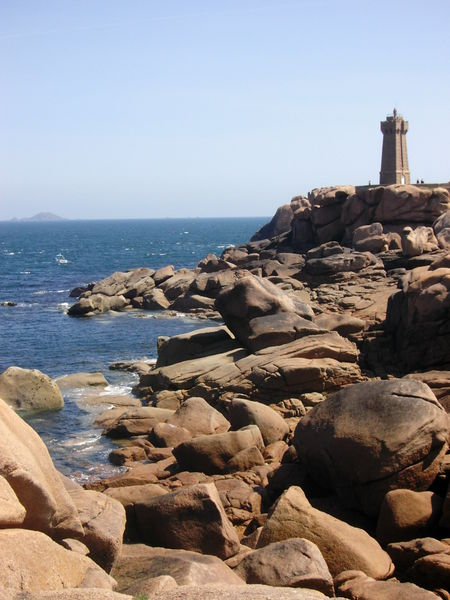
- The Côte de Granit Rose and the Ploumanac'h lighthouse, in Perros-Guirec

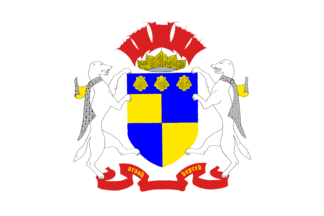
- Flag Coat of arms
- Location of Perros-Guirec
- Location within France Location within Brittany
- Coordinates: 48°48′51″N 3°26′32″W
- Country: France
- Region: Brittany
- Department: Côtes-d'Armor
- Arrondissement: Lannion
- Canton: Perros-Guirec
- Intercommunality: Lannion-Trégor Communauté

Government
  - Mayor (2020–2026): Erven Léon
- Area^{1}: 14.16 km^{2} (5.47 sq mi)
- Highest elevation: 96 m (315 ft)
- Lowest elevation: 0 m (0 ft)
- Population (2023): 7,336
  - Density: 518.1/km^{2} (1,342/sq mi)
- Time zone: UTC+01:00 (CET)
  - Summer (DST): UTC+02:00 (CEST)
- INSEE/Postal code: 22168 /22700
- ^{1} French Land Register data, which excludes lakes, ponds, glaciers > 1 km^{2} (0.386 sq mi or 247 acres) and river estuaries.

Perros-Guirec (French pronunciation: [pɛʁɔs ɡiʁɛk]; Breton: Perroz-Gireg) is a commune in the department of Côtes-d'Armor in Brittany. It has been a seaside resort since the end of the 19th century.

== Geography ==
=== Climate ===
Perros-Guirec has an oceanic climate (Köppen climate classification Cfb). The average annual temperature in Perros-Guirec is 11.9 °C (53.4 °F). The average annual rainfall is 856.2 mm (33.71 in) with December as the wettest month. The temperatures are highest on average in August, at around 17.3 °C (63.1 °F), and lowest in February, at around 7.3 °C (45.1 °F). The highest temperature ever recorded in Perros-Guirec was 36.2 °C (97.2 °F) on 19 July 2016; the coldest temperature ever recorded was −11.0 °C (12.2 °F) on 21 February 1948.

Climate data for Perros-Guirec (1981–2010 averages, extremes 1947−present)
Month	Jan	Feb	Mar	Apr	May	Jun	Jul	Aug	Sep	Oct	Nov	Dec	Year
Record high °C (°F)	17.8 (64.0)	20.6 (69.1)	25.0 (77.0)	26.9 (80.4)	30.3 (86.5)	32.7 (90.9)	36.2 (97.2)	35.6 (96.1)	30.5 (86.9)	30.8 (87.4)	22.0 (71.6)	18.3 (64.9)	36.2 (97.2)
Mean daily maximum °C (°F)	9.6 (49.3)	9.7 (49.5)	11.5 (52.7)	12.7 (54.9)	15.2 (59.4)	17.7 (63.9)	19.8 (67.6)	20.4 (68.7)	18.9 (66.0)	16.0 (60.8)	12.5 (54.5)	10.2 (50.4)	14.5 (58.1)
Daily mean °C (°F)	7.4 (45.3)	7.3 (45.1)	8.9 (48.0)	9.9 (49.8)	12.4 (54.3)	14.8 (58.6)	16.9 (62.4)	17.3 (63.1)	16.0 (60.8)	13.4 (56.1)	10.2 (50.4)	8.0 (46.4)	11.9 (53.4)
Mean daily minimum °C (°F)	5.2 (41.4)	4.9 (40.8)	6.3 (43.3)	7.1 (44.8)	9.6 (49.3)	12.0 (53.6)	13.9 (57.0)	14.3 (57.7)	—	—	—	—	—
Record low °C (°F)	—	—	−3.2 (26.2)	0.0 (32.0)	1.8 (35.2)	6.0 (42.8)	8.2 (46.8)	7.8 (46.0)	7.0 (44.6)	1.0 (33.8)	−2.8 (27.0)	−10.0 (14.0)	−11.0 (12.2)
Average precipitation mm (inches)	93.3 (3.67)	76.3 (3.00)	65.5 (2.58)	64.9 (2.56)	61.3 (2.41)	45.5 (1.79)	47.4 (1.87)	49.5 (1.95)	55.4 (2.18)	91.5 (3.60)	95.8 (3.77)	109.8 (4.32)	856.2 (33.71)
Average precipitation days (≥ 1.0 mm)	15.9	12.4	12.2	11.3	10.2	8.1	8.7	8.3	9.2	13.8	15.6	15.6	141.5
Source: Meteociel

== Breton language ==
In 2008, 4.79% of primary school children attended bilingual schools.

== Tourism ==
Perros-Guirec is a seaside resort, with sandy beaches and water and beach sports. It is known for its pink granite rocks which have been sculpted by the sea into varied shapes and patterns. There are three large sandy beaches suitable for families: Trestraou beach is suitable for swimming, sunbathing as well as surfing, as it is sheltered and receives full sunshine; Trestrignel beach is wilder and more exposed to the wind; Saint-Guirec beach is smaller and even more picturesque with the presence of the Costaeres Castle on its island in front of it.

Perros-Guirec has a number of seafront villas and manors, many of which are built with pink granite extracted locally.

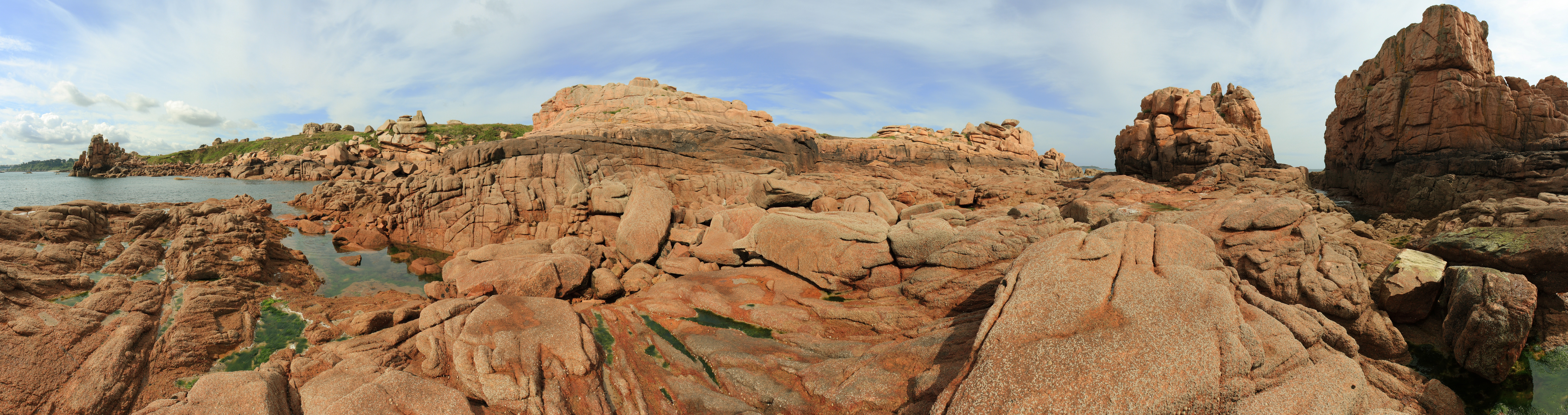
Pink granite coast, nearby Ploumanac'h

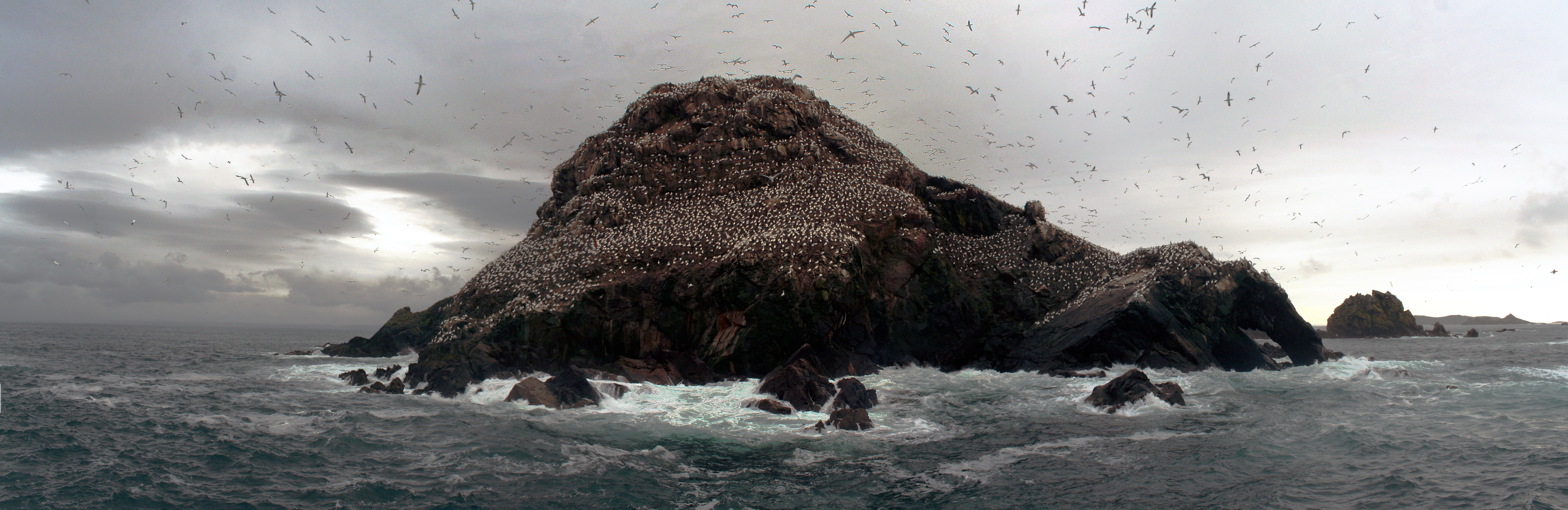
Panorama of the Natural Reserve of the 7 Islands

== Economy ==
Perros-Guirec's economy is largely based on tourism but benefits also from its proximity to Lannion technopole. The nearby Grand Isle, separated from the mainland by a narrow channel, was once famous for its granite quarrying industry. The rock was transported from the island by boat, and was used in the construction of many imposing buildings in Paris.

== International relations ==
Perros-Guirec is twinned with :

- (United Kingdom) Teignmouth in Devon in the southwest of England
- Barr, Bas-Rhin, France
- Quintin, France

== People ==
Inhabitants of Perros-Guirec are called Perrosiens in French.

Historical population

Year	Pop.	±% p.a.
1793	1,738	—
1800	1,477	−2.30%
1806	1,783	+3.19%
1821	1,968	+0.66%
1831	2,251	+1.35%
1836	2,366	+1.00%
1841	2,368	+0.02%
1846	2,555	+1.53%
1851	2,605	+0.39%
1856	2,635	+0.23%
1861	2,765	+0.97%
1866	2,800	+0.25%
1872	2,761	−0.23%
1876	2,778	+0.15%
1881	2,920	+1.00%
1886	2,713	−1.46%
1891	2,614	−0.74%
1896	2,809	+1.45%
1901	2,991	+1.26%

Year	Pop.	±% p.a.
1906	3,395	+2.57%
1911	3,488	+0.54%
1921	3,633	+0.41%
1926	4,078	+2.34%
1931	4,432	+1.68%
1936	4,605	+0.77%
1946	5,812	+2.36%
1954	5,231	−1.31%
1962	6,020	+1.77%
1968	6,866	+2.22%
1975	7,773	+1.79%
1982	7,496	−0.52%
1990	7,497	+0.00%
1999	7,614	+0.17%
2007	7,333	−0.47%
2012	7,376	+0.12%
2017	7,139	−0.65%
2023	7,336	+0.45%

Source: EHESS and INSEE (1968-2023)

Perros-Guirec was long attended by men of letters and artists, for instance the painter Maurice Denis, owner of a villa in Trestrignel ("Never the nature seemed to me more beautiful than in Perros"), writers Anatole Le Braz, Charles Le Goffic, or Ernest Renan who was behind the idea of the construction of the Grand Hotel in Trestraou, to name a few. Joseph Conrad lived here for several years and wrote many of his most famous maritime books during that period.

== Cultural references ==
Perros-Guirec is where, in Gaston Leroux's The Phantom of the Opera, a teenage Vicomte de Chagny retrieves young Christine Daaé's scarf from the sea. It is also the final resting place of her father, where The Phantom plays The Resurrection Of Lazarus on her father's violin for her. It is also the location where the 2022 Hallmark movie Moriah’s Lighthouse was filmed.

== See also ==
- Communes of the Côtes-d'Armor department
- Jentilez (Sept-Îles)
- Ploumanac'h Lighthouse
- Sept-Îles Lighthouse
