= Sept-Îles Lighthouse =

Lighthouse in Côtes-d'Armor, France

Sept-Îles lighthouse
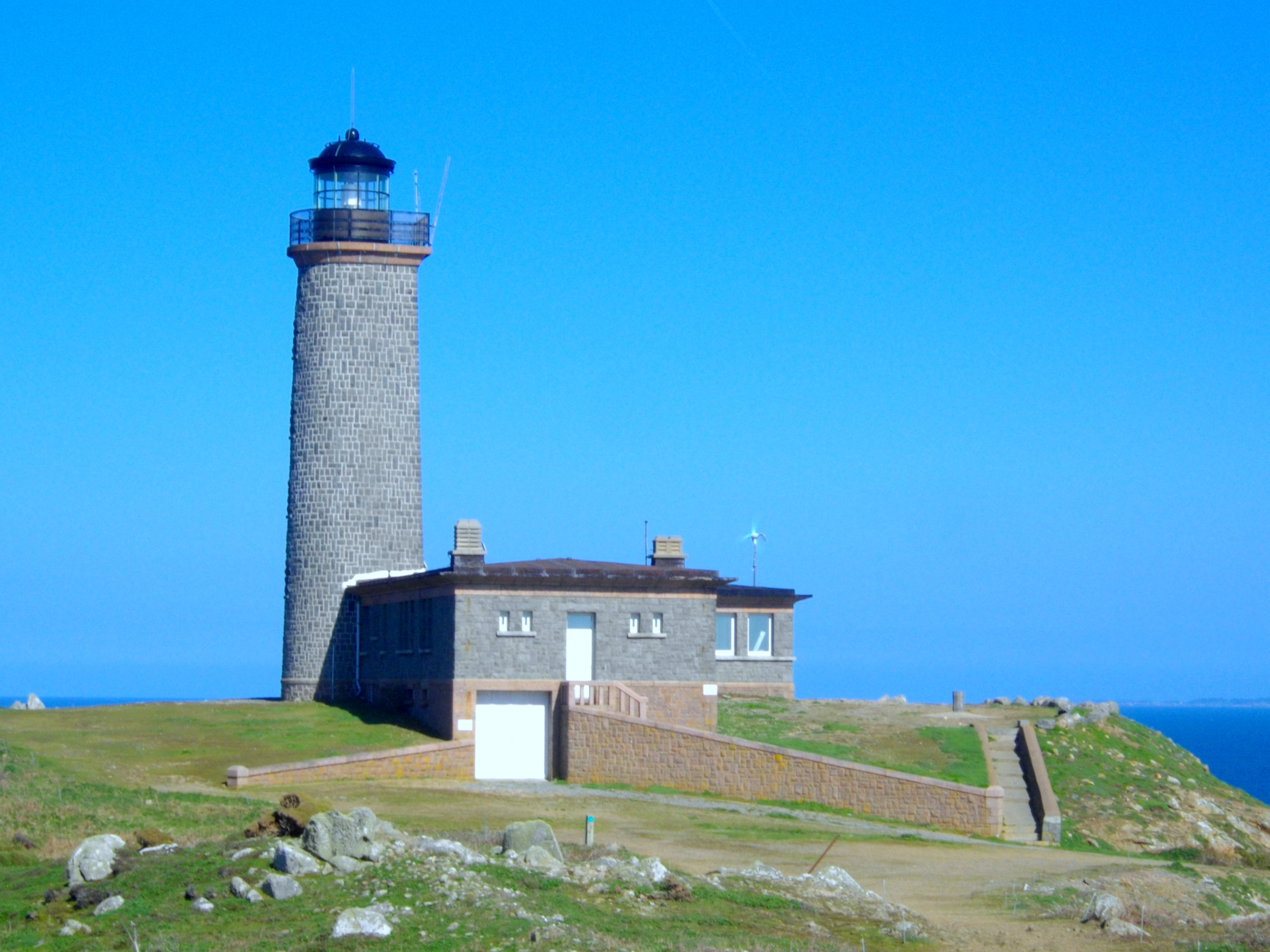
- Sept-Îles Light, 2013
- Location: Côtes-d'Armor, France
- Coordinates: 48°52′43″N 3°29′24″W

Tower
- Constructed: 1835 (first)
- Construction: stone tower
- Automated: 2007
- Height: 20 metres (66 ft)
- Shape: semi-cylindrical tower with balcony and lantern
- Markings: unpainted tower, black lantern
- Heritage: listed in the general inventory of cultural heritage,

Light
- First lit: 1952 (current)
- Focal height: 59 metres (194 ft)
- Range: 21 nautical miles (39 km; 24 mi)
- Characteristic: Fl (3) W 15s
- France no.: FR-0588

The Sept-Îles Lighthouse is an active lighthouse in Perros-Guirec, (Côtes-d'Armor) France, located on the Île aux moines, an island of the Sept-Îles archipelago in the English Channel. The island is accessible, but the lighthouse is closed to the public.

== History ==
The first lighthouse, a round tower, was illuminated in May 1835, and then replaced in 1854 by a square tower 16 ft (5 m) taller.

Destroyed 4 August 1944, it was rebuilt in 1949 and relit in July 1952.

From 1957 onward, it has used wind for electric power. The wind turbine is the most powerful in service of a French lighthouse.

The archipelago of Sept-Îles has been a bird sanctuary since 1912.

The Sept-Îles Lighthouse was one of the last French lighthouses to be de-manned, and only became automated at the end of August 2007.

== See also ==
- List of tallest lighthouses
- List of lighthouses in France
