= Jentilez =

Archipelago in Côtes-d'Armor, France

Coordinates: 48°53′N 3°29′W

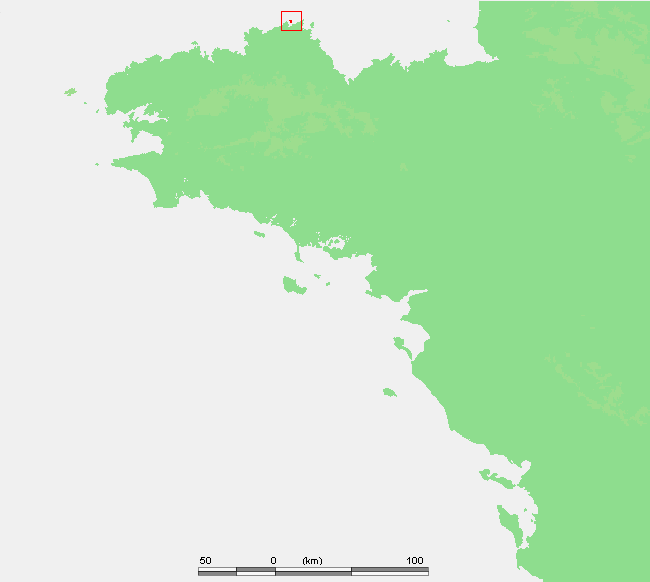
Location of Sept Îles

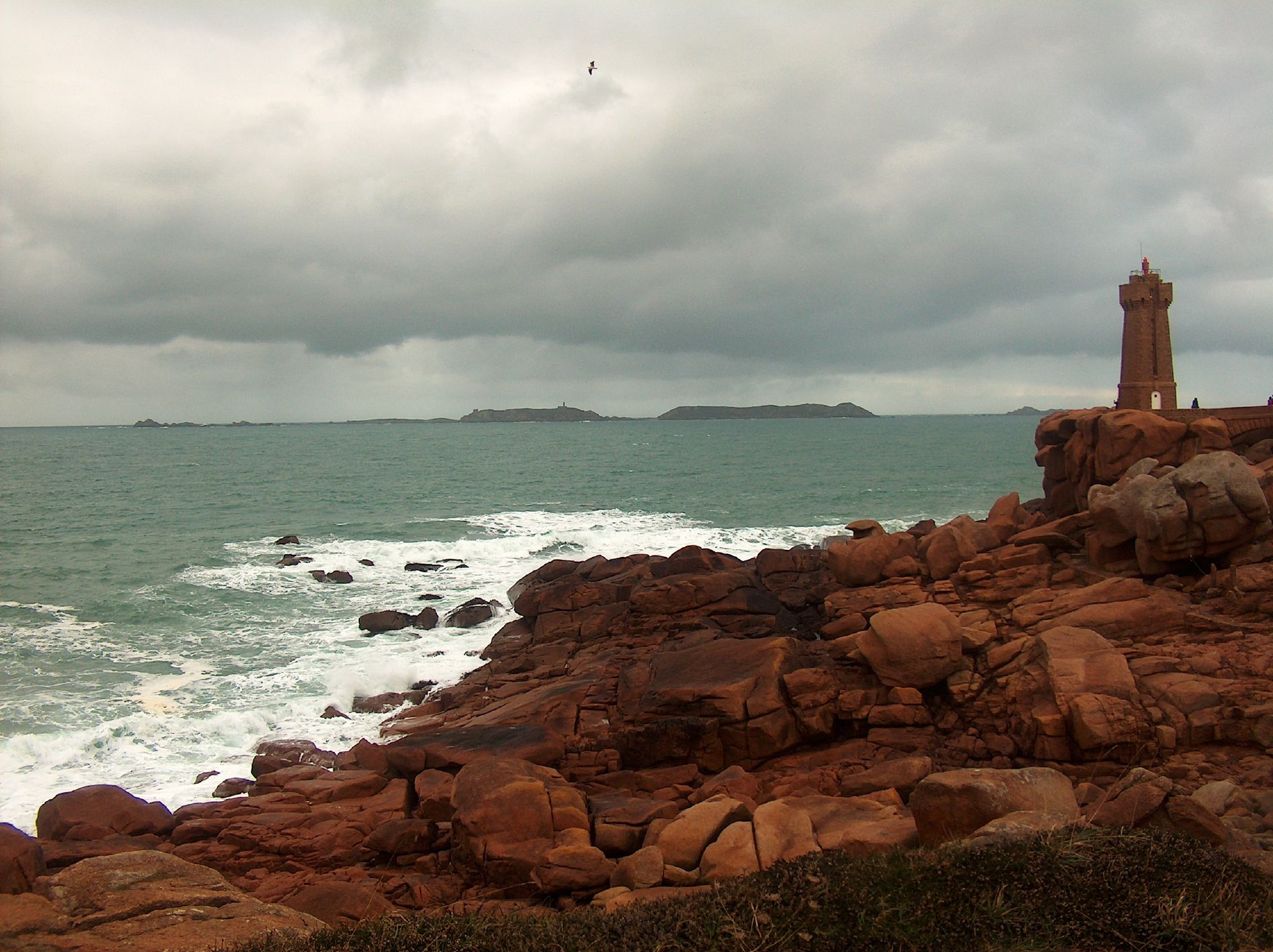
Sept Îles, seen from Ploumanac'h

Sept-Îles (French pronunciation: [sɛt il], "Seven Islands") or Jentilez (in Breton) is a small archipelago off the north coast of Brittany, in the Perros-Guirec commune of Côtes-d'Armor. This group of islands is home to an important bird reserve, and is the home of various seabirds, including northern gannets, cormorants, and members of the Alcidae family (puffins, common guillemots, razorbills). This is also a reserve for grey seals.

During World War II, the islands were the site of the Battle of Sept-Îles in October 1943, when a German force of torpedo boats and minesweepers, escorting a blockade runner sank the British light cruiser HMS Charybdis and caused the scuttling of one of five escorting destroyers.

== Islands of the Archipelago ==
Despite its name, the Sept-Iles are only made up of five islands and a handful of rocks. The French name Sept-Iles derived from a misunderstanding of the old Breton name for the islands, the Sentiles. The name stuck, however, and two groups of reefs were designated as islands in order for the name to stay true. The 5 main islands (or Enez in Breton) are:

- Enez Bonno in Breton, Île Bono in French: the largest of the islands;
- Enez Plat in Breton, Île plate in French;
- Enez ar Breur or Jentilez in Breton, Île aux Moines in French: the only island accessible to the public, where you can find a lighthouse (the Sept-Îles Lighthouse) and the remains of a fort;
- Melbann in Breton, Île de Malban in French;
- Riouzig in Breton, Île Rouzic in French: the main spot for birds.

In addition to these islands, the two reefs are called ar Zerr in Breton, le Cerf in French (the deer), and Kostann.

Other islets include Enez ar Razhed (Rat island) and ar Moudennoù.

The isle of Taveeg (Tomé) is closer to the coast, and is not considered part of the archipelago.

== Gallery ==
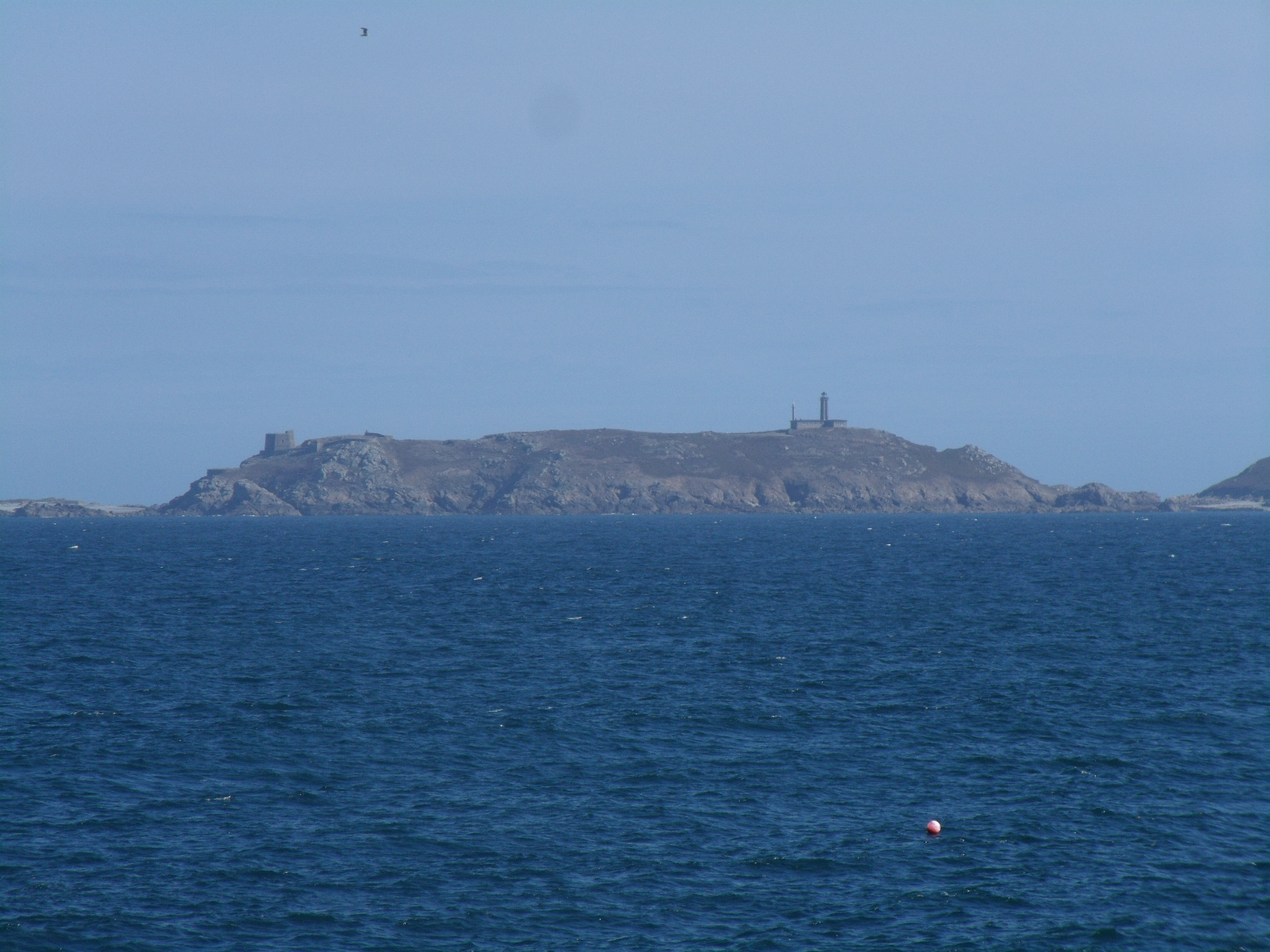
Enez ar Breur, with the lighthouse and the fort

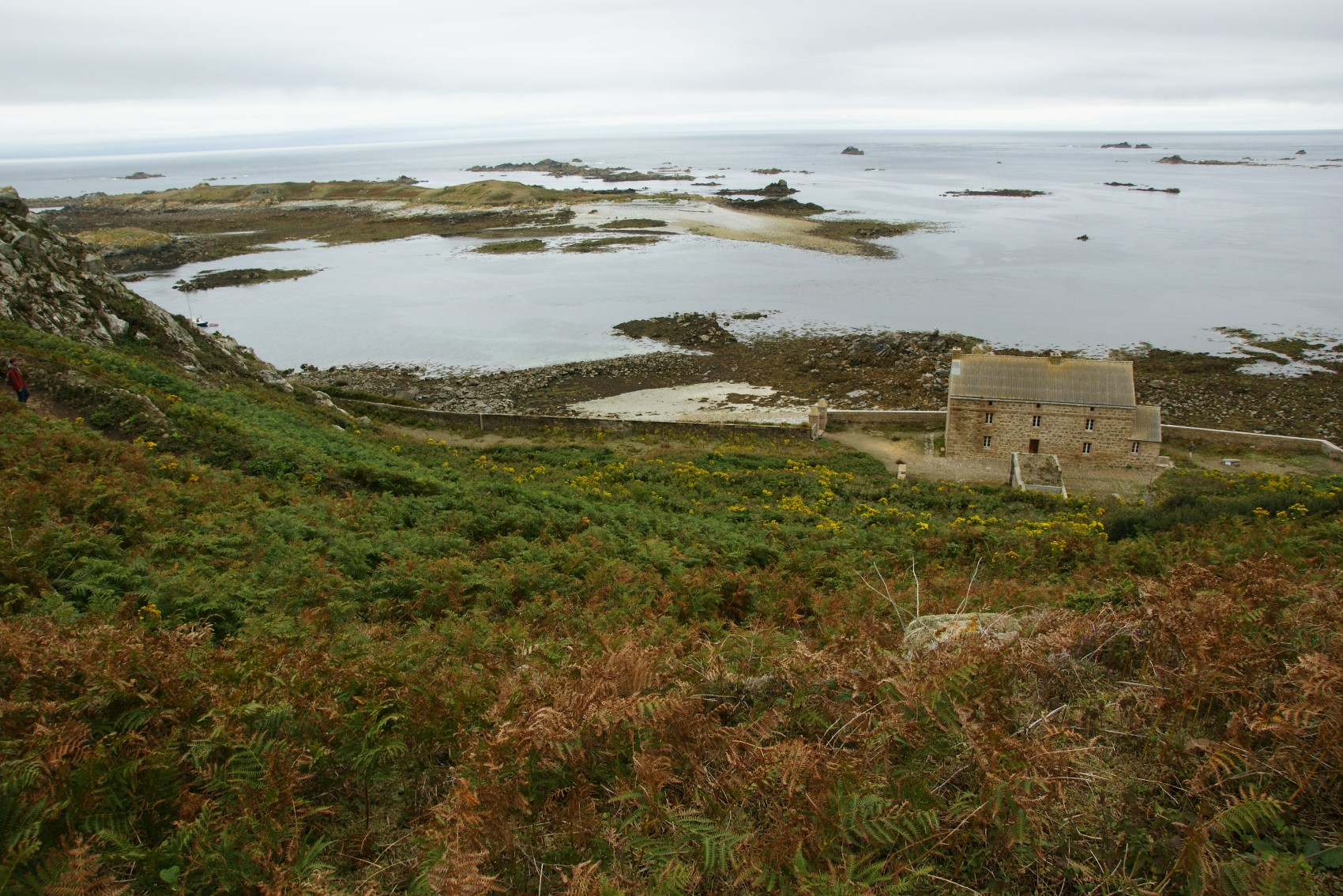
Enez plat

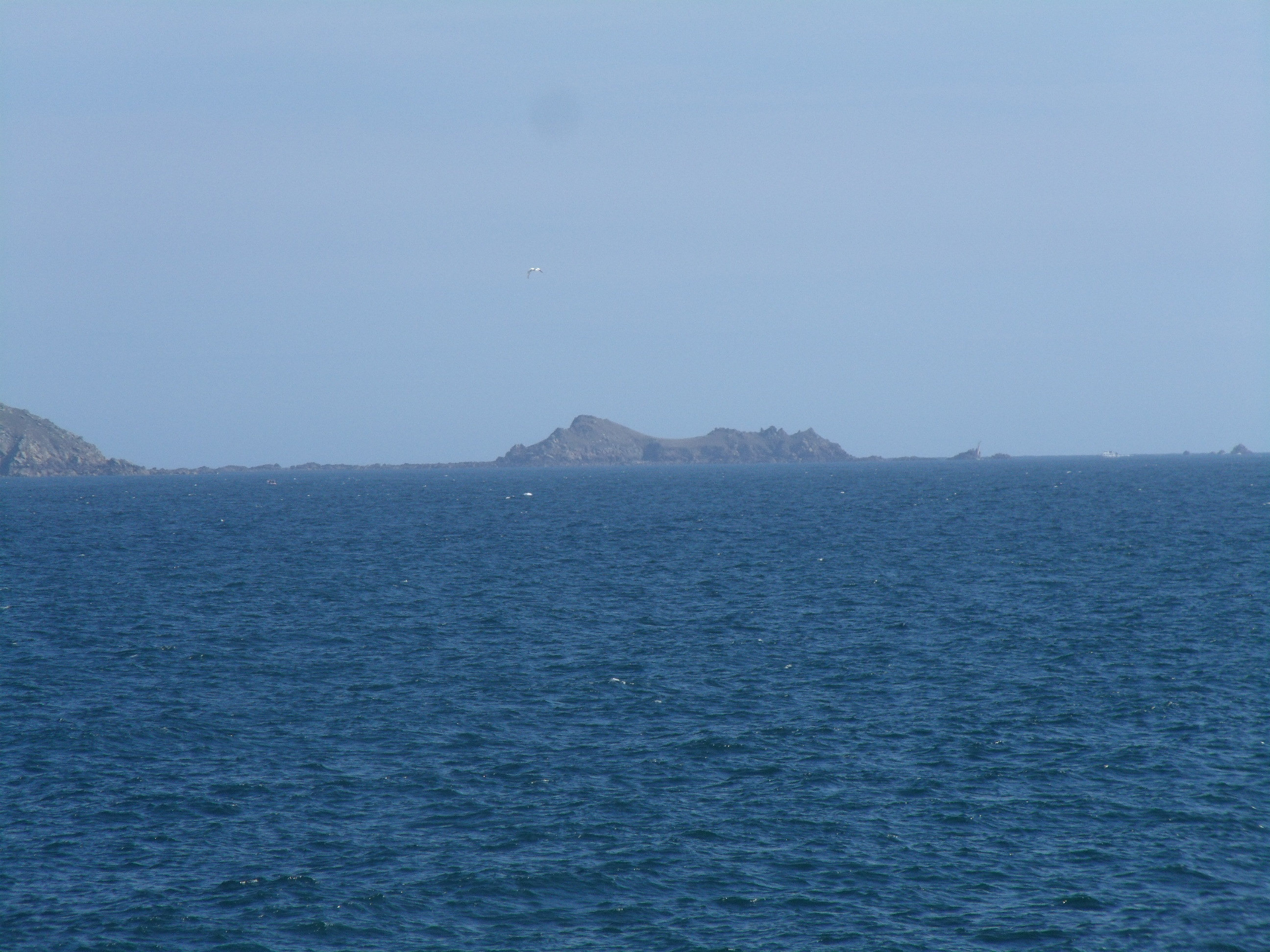
Enez Melbann

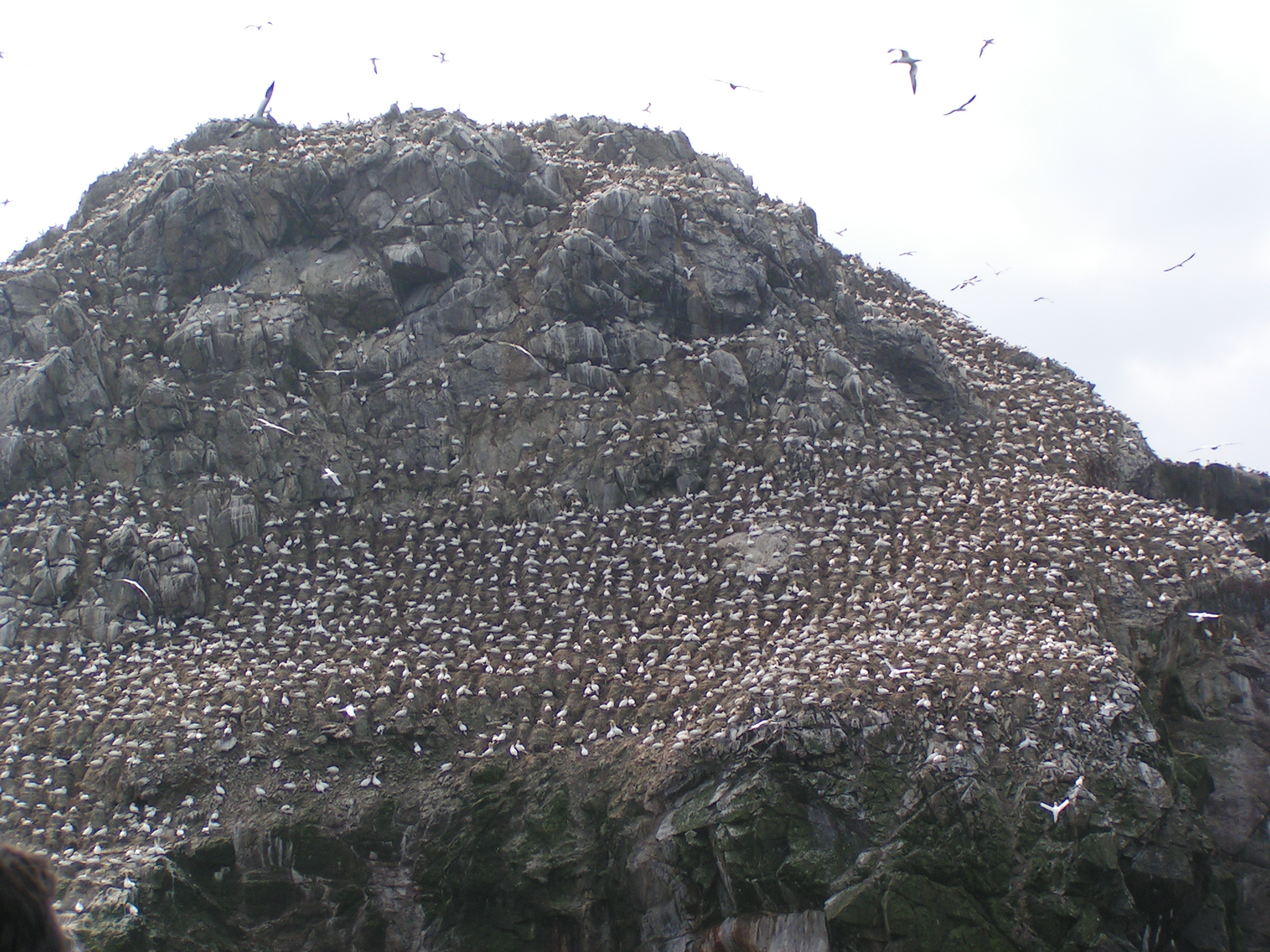
Enez Riouzig

== See also ==
- Sept-Îles Lighthouse
- Battle of Sept-Îles
