= Ploumanac'h =

Village in Bretagne, France

Coordinates: 48°50′N 3°29′W

Ploumanac'h (French pronunciation: [plumanak] or [plumana], and in Breton [pluˈmãːnax]) is a village port in a natural harbour, part of the commune of Perros-Guirec, in the arrondissement of Lannion, in the Côtes-d'Armor department of the Brittany region of France. In 2015 it was voted "the village most preferred by the French". It lies 3 kilometres north-west of the town Perros-Guirec.

An outstanding feature of the area is the pink granite rock and sands of the Côte de Granit Rose coast. Buildings of interest are the tidal mill and the Ploumanac'h Lighthouse. The chapel of Saint Guirec faces the beach, opposite its little 12th-century oratory which is surrounded by the sea at high tide. The small chateau is not open to the public but it was the place where Henryk Sienkiewicz wrote Quo Vadis and gained himself a Nobel Prize in Literature.

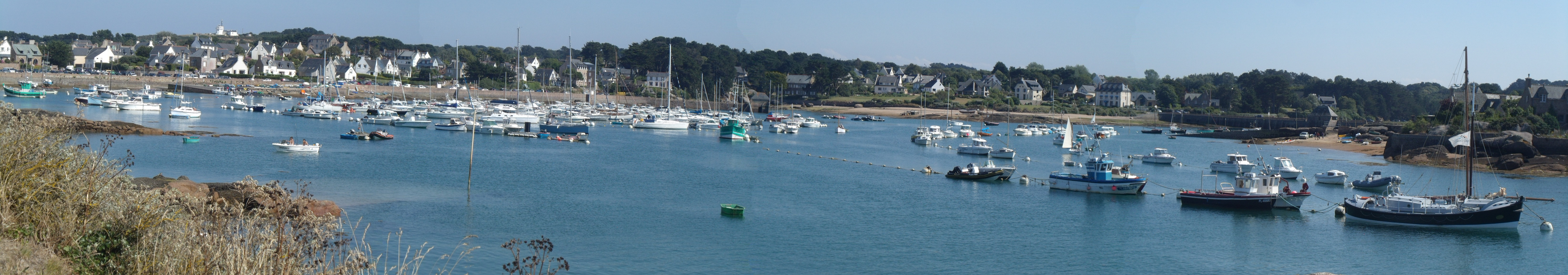

== Climate ==
Climate data for Ploumanac'h / 1981–2010 normals, extremes 1947–present
Month	Jan	Feb	Mar	Apr	May	Jun	Jul	Aug	Sep	Oct	Nov	Dec	Year
Record high °C (°F)	17.8 (64.0)	20.6 (69.1)	23.6 (74.5)	26.9 (80.4)	30.3 (86.5)	32.7 (90.9)	36.2 (97.2)	35.6 (96.1)	30.5 (86.9)	30.8 (87.4)	22.0 (71.6)	18.3 (64.9)	36.2 (97.2)
Mean daily maximum °C (°F)	9.6 (49.3)	9.7 (49.5)	11.5 (52.7)	12.7 (54.9)	15.2 (59.4)	17.7 (63.9)	19.8 (67.6)	20.4 (68.7)	18.9 (66.0)	16.0 (60.8)	12.5 (54.5)	10.2 (50.4)	14.5 (58.1)
Daily mean °C (°F)	7.4 (45.3)	7.3 (45.1)	8.9 (48.0)	9.9 (49.8)	12.4 (54.3)	14.8 (58.6)	16.9 (62.4)	17.3 (63.1)	16.0 (60.8)	13.4 (56.1)	10.2 (50.4)	8.0 (46.4)	11.9 (53.4)
Mean daily minimum °C (°F)	5.2 (41.4)	4.9 (40.8)	6.3 (43.3)	7.1 (44.8)	9.6 (49.3)	12.0 (53.6)	13.9 (57.0)	14.3 (57.7)	13.2 (55.8)	10.8 (51.4)	8.0 (46.4)	5.9 (42.6)	9.3 (48.7)
Record low °C (°F)	−11.0 (12.2)	−11.0 (12.2)	−3.2 (26.2)	0.0 (32.0)	1.8 (35.2)	6.0 (42.8)	8.2 (46.8)	7.8 (46.0)	7.0 (44.6)	1.0 (33.8)	−2.8 (27.0)	−10.0 (14.0)	−11.0 (12.2)
Average precipitation mm (inches)	93.3 (3.67)	76.3 (3.00)	65.5 (2.58)	64.9 (2.56)	61.3 (2.41)	45.5 (1.79)	47.4 (1.87)	49.5 (1.95)	55.4 (2.18)	91.5 (3.60)	95.8 (3.77)	109.8 (4.32)	856.2 (33.71)
Average precipitation days (≥ 1 mm)	15.9	12.4	12.2	11.3	10.2	8.1	8.7	8.3	9.2	13.8	15.6	15.6	141.5
Source: Meteociel
