= Côte de Granit Rose =

Stretch of coastline in Brittany, France

Coordinates: 48.83°N 3.48°W

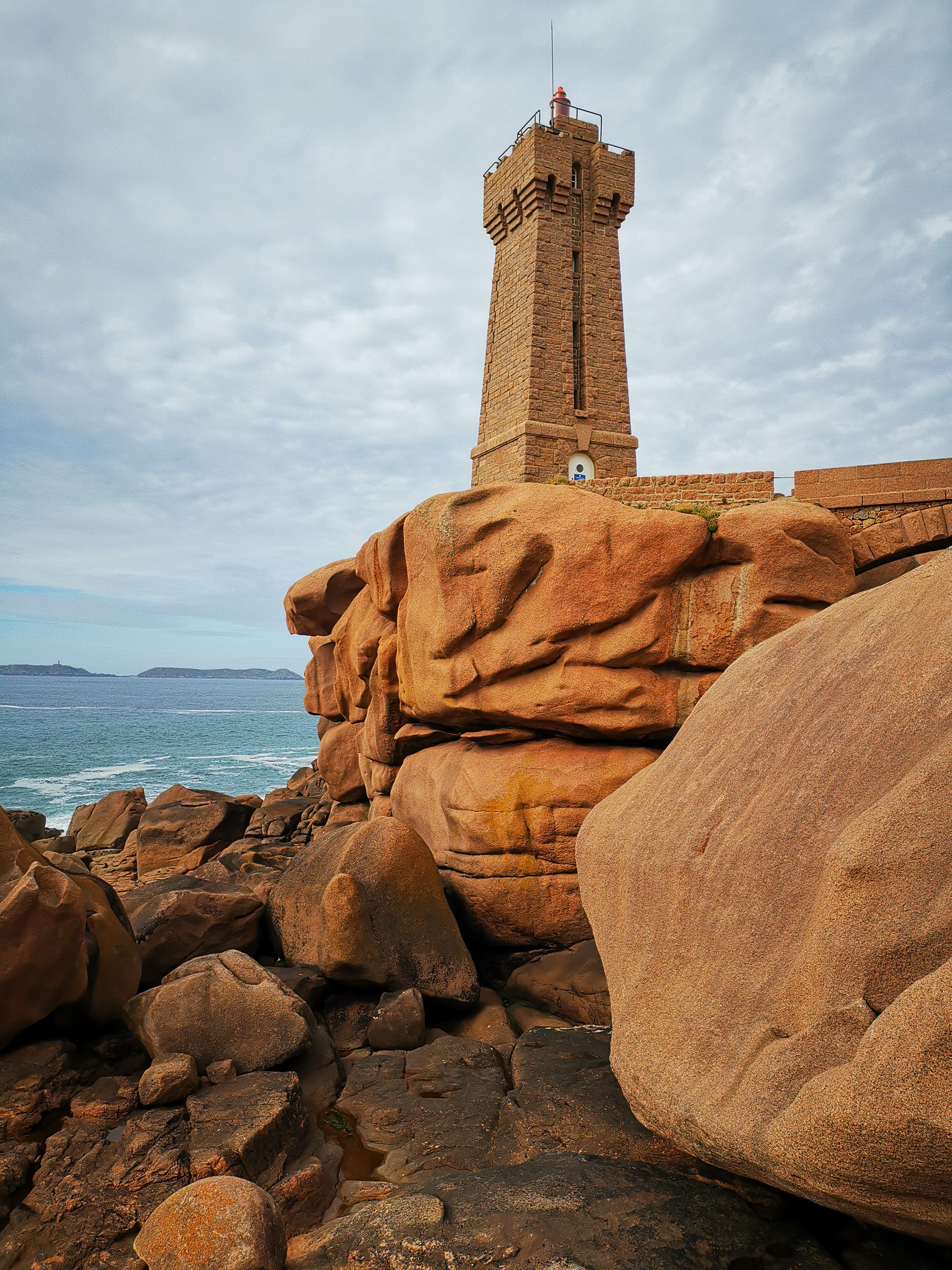
Men Ruz lighthouse, Ploumanac'h, Brittany, France

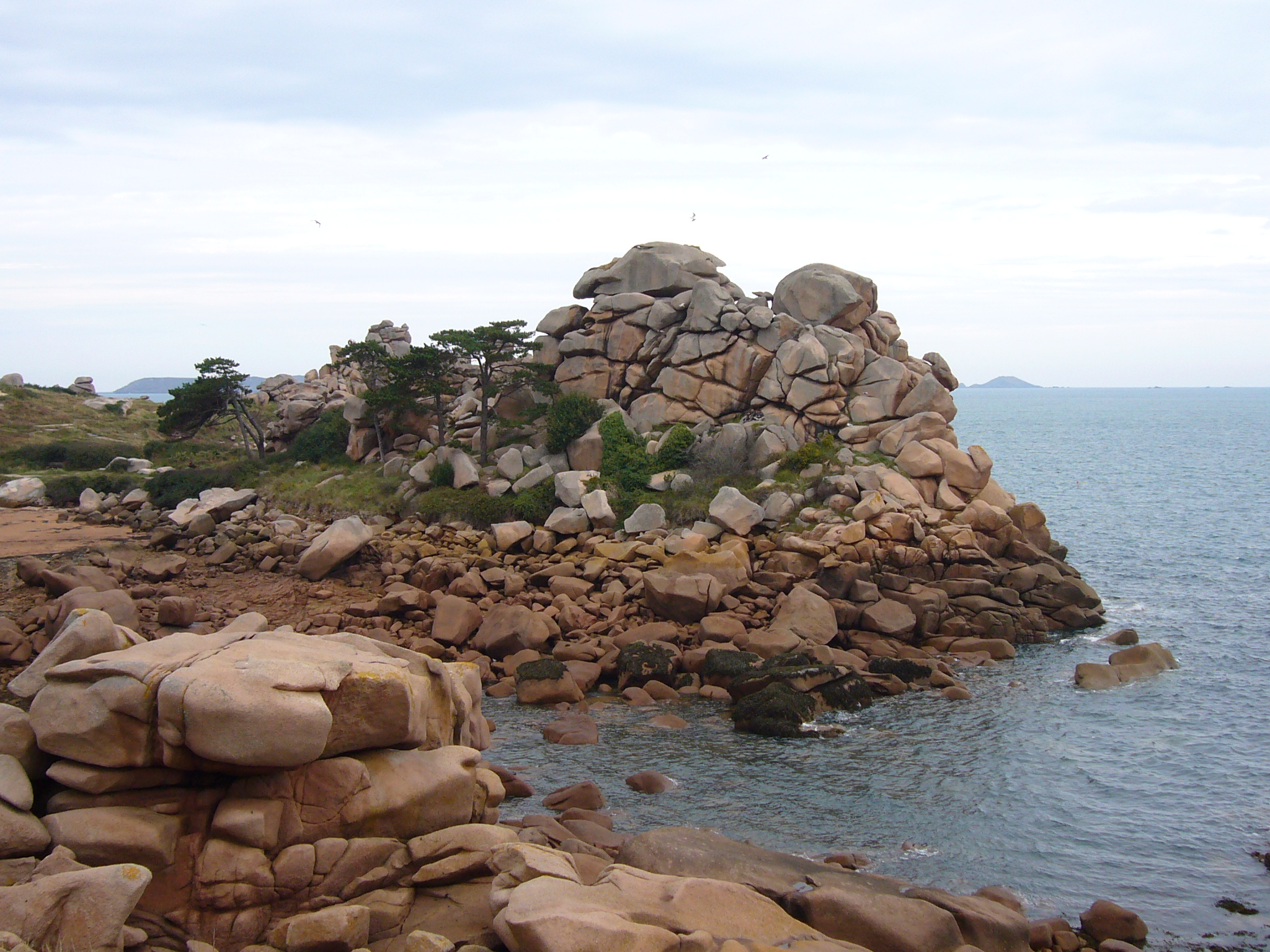
The Côte de granit rose in Brittany

The Côte de granite rose or Pink Granite Coast (Breton: Arvor greunvaen roz) is a stretch of coastline in the Côtes d'Armor departement of northern Brittany, France. It stretches for more than thirty kilometres from Plestin-les-Grèves to Louannec, encompassing Trégastel.

It has become a popular tourist destination due to its unusual pink sands and rock formations.

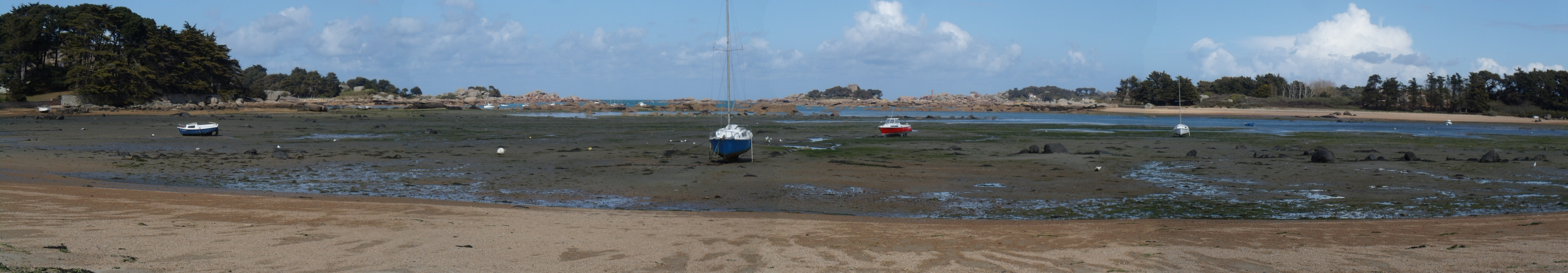
Trégastel and Ploumanac'h
